= Karjat taluka, Raigad =

Karjat
- Taluka
- Location in the Maharashtra state of India Karjat (India)
- Coordinates: 18.9167°N 73.33°E
- Country: India
- State: Maharashtra
- Division: Konkan
- District: Raigad
- Headquarters: Karjat

Government
  - Body: Panchayat Samiti Karjat Raigad
  - Chairperson: Smt. Sushma Tai Thackeray
  - Tehsildar: Vikram Deshamukh
  - MP: Shrirang Barne (Maval Constituency)
  - MLA: Mahendra Thorve (Karjat constituency)

Area
  - Total: 1,503.61 km^{2} (580.55 sq mi)

Population (2011)
  - Total: 212,051
  - Density: 141.028/km^{2} (365.261/sq mi)
- Demonym: Karjatkar

Language
- Time zone: UTC+5:30 (IST)
- PIN: 410201
- Telephone code: 02148
- Vehicle registration: MH-46, MH-06

Karjat taluka is a subdistrict/upazila/tehsil in Raigad district of the Indian state of Maharashtra.

== Officer ==
=== MLA ===
- Mahendra Thorve
  (Karjat constituency)

=== Tahasildar & Executive Magistrate ===
- Tehsildar

Dr. Shital Rasal

=== Prant Adhikari ===
- MS. Vaishali Pardesi

=== Police commissioner ===
- Sub-Division. Superintendent of Police. Karjat

Mr. Anil Gherdikar

- Po.ni - Karjat Po.Ste. Po.N.

Mr. Surendra Garad

- Po.ni - Neral Po.Ste. S.P.N.

Mr. Sanjay Shantaram Bangar

=== Chairperson & Deputy Chairperson Panchayat Samiti ===
- Chairperson -

Smt. Sushma Tai Thackeray

- Deputy Chairperson -

Smt. Jaywanti Hindola

== Raigad district ==
As of August 2015, there were 8 sub-divisions, 15 talukas, 1970 villages, 60 revenue circles and 350 sazzas in Raigad district. The talukas being Alibag, Karjat, Khalapur, Mahad, Mangaon, Mhasala, Murud, Panvel, Pen, Poladpur, Roha, Shrivardhan, Sudhagad Pali, Tala and Uran.

== Demographics ==
Religions in Karjat taluk (2011)
| Religion | Percent |
| Hinduism | 87.75% |
| Islam | 5.68% |
| Buddhism | 5.33% |
| Jainism | 0.57% |
| Other or not stated | 0.67% |

Karjat taluka has a population of 212,051 according to the 2011 census. Karjat had a literacy rate of 80.65% and a sex ratio of 966 females per 1000 males. 25,216 (11.89%) are under 7 years of age. 52,485 (24.75%) lived in urban areas. Scheduled Castes and Scheduled Tribes make up 5.43% and 23.94% of the population respectively.

Languages of Karjat taluk (2011)
1. Marathi (85.2%)
2. 'Other' Marathi (3.90%)
3. Hindi (3.88%)
4. Urdu (3.41%)
5. Others (3.62%)

At the time of the 2011 Census of India, 85.19% of the population in the taluka spoke Marathi, 3.88% Hindi, and 3.41% Urdu as their first language. 3.90% of the population recorded their language as 'Others' under Marathi.

== Village ==
- Neral
- Kalamb Karjat
- Kashele
- Shelu
- Damat
