= Mahad taluka =

Taluka in Maharashtra India

Mahad
- Taluka
- Location in the Maharashtra state of India
- Coordinates: 18.08°N 73.42°E
- Country: India
- State: Maharashtra
- Division: Konkan Division
- District: Raigad
- Headquarters: Mahad

Government
  - Body: Panchayat Samiti Mahad Raigad
  - Chairperson: NA
  - Tehsildar: NA
  - MP: Sunil Tatkare (Raigad Constituency)
  - MLA: Bharatshet Gogawale (Mahad constituency)

Area
  - Total: 1,503.61 km^{2} (580.55 sq mi)

Population (2011)
  - Total: 180,191
  - Density: 119.839/km^{2} (310.381/sq mi)
- Demonym: Mahadkar

Language
- Time zone: UTC+5:30 (IST)
- PIN: 402301
- Telephone code: 02145
- Vehicle registration: MH-46, MH-06

Mahad taluka is a subdistrict/upazila/tehsil in Raigad district of the Indian state of Maharashtra.

== Raigad district ==
As of August 2015, there were 8 sub-divisions, 15 talukas, 1970 villages, 60 revenue circles and 350 sazzas in Raigad district. The talukas are Alibag, Karjat, Khalapur, Mahad, Mangaon, Mhasala, Murud, Panvel, Pen, Poladpur, Roha, Shrivardhan, Sudhagad-Pali, Tala and Uran.

== Demographics ==
Religions in Mahad taluk (2011)
| Religion | Percent |
| Hinduism | 79.44% |
| Islam | 13.33% |
| Buddhism | 6.68% |
| Other or not stated | 0.55% |

Mahad taluka has a population of 180,191 according to the 2011 census. Mahad had a literacy rate of 81.90% and a sex ratio of 1031 females per 1000 males. 19,044 (10.57%) are under 7 years of age. 41,236 (22.88%) lived in urban areas. Scheduled Castes and Scheduled Tribes make up 4.70% and 5.12% of the population respectively.

Languages of Mahad taluk (2011)
1. Marathi (84.3%)
2. Urdu (10.0%)
3. Hindi (1.89%)
4. Others (3.80%)

At the time of the 2011 Census of India, 84.28% of the population in the taluka spoke Marathi, 10.03% Urdu and 1.89% Hindi as their first language.
