= Shrivardhan taluka =

Taluka in Maharashtra India

Shrivardhan taluka is a taluka in Raigad district in the Indian state of Maharashtra. The town of Shrivardhan is the administrative headquarters of this taluka.

== Raigad district ==
As of August 2015, there were 8 subdivisions, 15 talukas, 1,970 villages, 60 revenue circles and 350 sazzas within Raigad district, the talukas being: Alibag, Karjat, Khalapur, Mahad, Mangaon, Mhasala, Murud, Panvel, Pen, Poladpur, Roha, Shrivardhan, Sudhagad Pali, Tala and Uran.

== Demographics ==
Religions in Shrivardhan taluk (2011)
Religion	Percent
Hinduism	73.24%
Islam	22.80%
Buddhism	3.30%
Other or not stated	0.66%

Shrivardhan taluka has a population of 83,027 according to the 2011 census. Shrivardhan had a literacy rate of 82.32% and a sex ratio of 1156 females per 1000 males. 9,017 (10.86%) are under 7 years of age. 22,075 (26.59%) lived in urban areas. Scheduled Castes and Scheduled Tribes make up 2.97% and 11.41% of the population respectively.

Languages of Shrivardhan taluk (2011)
1. Marathi (75.7%)
2. Urdu (20.9%)
3. Hindi (1.81%)
4. Others (1.62%)

At the time of the 2011 Census of India, 75.65% of the population in the taluka spoke Marathi, 20.92% Urdu and 1.81% Hindi as their first language.
