= Poladpur taluka =

Taluka in Maharashtra India

Poladpur taluka is a taluka in Raigad district of Maharashtra an Indian state.

== Raigad district ==
As of August 2015, there were 8 sub-divisions, 15 talukas, 1970 villages, 60 revenue circles and 350 sazzas in Raigad district. The talukas being Alibag, Karjat, Khalapur, Mahad, Mangaon, Mhasala, Murud, Panvel, Pen, Poladpur, Roha, Shrivardhan, Sudhagad Pali, Tala and Uran.

== Demographics ==
Religions in Poladpur taluk (2011)
Religion	Percent
Hinduism	88.80%
Buddhism	6.30%
Islam	4.76%
Other or not stated	0.14%

Poladpur taluka has a population of 45,464 according to the 2011 census. Poladpur had a literacy rate of 76.41% and a sex ratio of 1103 females per 1000 males. 4,773 (10.50%) are under 7 years of age. 5,944 (13.07%) lived in urban areas. Scheduled Castes and Scheduled Tribes make up 6.64% and 5.42% of the population respectively.

Languages of Poladpur taluk (2011)
1. Marathi (94.97%)
2. Urdu (2.72%)
3. Hindi (1.08%)
4. Others (1.23%)

At the time of the 2011 Census of India, 94.97% of the population in the taluka spoke Marathi, 2.72% Urdu and 1.08% Hindi as their first language.
