= Alibag taluka =

Alibag
- Taluka
- Location in the Maharashtra state of India
- Coordinates: 18.64°N 72.88°E
- Country: India
- State: Maharashtra
- Division: Konkan Division
- District: Raigad
- Headquarters: Alibag

Government
  - Body: Panchayat Samiti Alibag Raigad
  - Chairperson: Mrs. Priya Nathuram Pedhvi
  - Tehsildar: Mr. Sachin Shezaal
  - MP: Sunil Tatkare (Raigad Constituency)
  - MLA: Mahendra Dalvi (Alibag constituency)

Area
  - Total: 1,503.61 km^{2} (580.55 sq mi)

Population (2011)
  - Total: 236,167
  - Density: 157.067/km^{2} (406.801/sq mi)
- Demonym: Alibagkar

Language
- Time zone: UTC+5:30 (IST)
- PIN: 410201
- Telephone code: 02141
- Vehicle registration: MH-46, MH-06

Alibag taluka is a subdistrict/upazila/tehsil in Raigad district of the Indian state of Maharashtra.

== Raigad district ==
As of August 2015, there were 8 sub-divisions, 15 talukas, 1970 villages, 60 revenue circles and 350 sazzas in Raigad district. The talukas being Alibag, Karjat, Khalapur, Mahad, Mangaon, Mhasala, Murud, Panvel, Pen, Poladpur, Roha, Shrivardhan, Sudhagad Pali, Tala and Uran.

== Demographics ==
Religions in Alibag taluk (2011)
Religion	Percent
Hinduism	93.82%
Islam	3.66%
Buddhism	1.29%
Jainism	0.69%
Other or not stated	0.54%

Alibag taluka has a population of 236,167 according to the 2011 census. Alibag had a literacy rate of 85.92%, and a sex ratio of 980 females per 1000 males. 22,125 (9.37%) are under 7 years of age. About 41,686 (17.65%) lived in urban areas. Scheduled Castes and Scheduled Tribes make up 2.46% and 15.82% of the population respectively.

Languages of Alibag taluk (2011)
1. Marathi (91.6%)
2. Hindi (3.19%)
3. Urdu (1.50%)
4. Others (3.70%)

At the time of the 2011 Census of India, 91.61% of the population in the taluka spoke Marathi, 3.19% Hindi and 1.50% Urdu as their first language.

== Geographical indication ==
Alibag White onion was awarded the Geographical Indication (GI) status tag from the Geographical Indications Registry, under the Union Government of India, on 16 November 2022.

Alibag Pandhara Kanda Shetkari Utpadak Gat from Alibag, proposed the GI registration of Alibag White onion. After filing the application in January 2020, the Onion was granted the GI tag in 2022 by the Geographical Indication Registry in Chennai, making the name "Alibag White onion" exclusive to the Onion grown in the region. It thus became the second onion variety from Maharashtra after Lasalgaon onion and the 17th type of goods from Maharashtra to earn the GI tag.

The GI tag protects the onion from illegal selling and marketing, and gives it legal protection and a unique identity.
