= Mangaon taluka =

Taluka in Maharashtra India

Mangaon
- Taluka
- Location in the Maharashtra state of India
- Coordinates: 18.24°N 73.28°E
- Country: India
- State: Maharashtra
- Division: Konkan Division
- District: Raigad
- Headquarters: Mangaon

Government
  - Body: Panchayat Samiti Mangaon Raigad
  - Chairperson: NA
  - Tehsildar: NA
  - MP: Sunil Tatkare (Raigad Constituency)
  - MLA: Aditi Sunil Tatkare (Shrivardhan constituency)

Area
  - Total: 1,503.61 km^{2} (580.55 sq mi)

Population (2011)
  - Total: 159,613
  - Density: 106.153/km^{2} (274.936/sq mi)
- Demonym: Mangaonkar

Language
- Time zone: UTC+5:30 (IST)
- PIN: 402104
- Telephone code: 02140
- Vehicle registration: MH-06

Mangaon taluka is a subdistrict/upazila/tehsil in Raigad district of the Indian state of Maharashtra.

== Raigad district ==
As of August 2015, there were 8 sub-divisions, 15 talukas, 1,970 villages, 60 revenue circles and 350 sazzas in Raigad district. The talukas being Alibag, Karjat, Khalapur, Mahad, Mangaon, Mhasala, Murud, Panvel, Pen, Poladpur, Roha, Shrivardhan, Sudhagad-Pali, Tala and Uran.

== Demographics ==
Religions in Mangaon taluk (2011)
Religion	Percent
Hinduism	77.95%
Islam	15.00%
Buddhism	6.47%
Other or not stated	0.58%

Mangaon taluka has a population of 159,613 according to the 2011 census. Mangaon had a literacy rate of 79.87% and a sex ratio of 1021 females per 1000 males. 17,637 (11.05%) are under 7 years of age. 18,535 (11.61%) lived in urban areas. Scheduled Castes and Scheduled Tribes make up 6.63% and 8.97% of the population respectively.

Languages of Mangaon taluk (2011)
1. Marathi (79.7%)
2. Urdu (14.0%)
3. 'Other' Marathi (1.81%)
4. Hindi (1.49%)
5. Others (3.00%)

At the time of the 2011 Census of India, 79.74% of the population in the taluka spoke Marathi, 13.96% Urdu and 1.49% Hindi as their first language. 1.81% of the population recorded their language as 'Others' under Marathi.
