= Sudhagad-Pali taluka =

Taluka in Maharashtra India

Sudhagad-Pali taluka is a taluka in Raigad district of Maharashtra an Indian state.

== Raigad district ==
As of August 2015, there were 8 sub-divisions, 15 talukas, 1970 villages, 60 revenue circles and 350 sazzas in Raigad district. The talukas being Alibag, Karjat, Khalapur, Mahad, Mangaon, Mhasala, Murud, Panvel, Pen, Poladpur, Roha, Shrivardhan, Sudhagad-Pali, Tala and Uran.

== Demographics ==
Religions in Sudhagad taluk (2011)
Religion	Percent
Hinduism	92.25%
Buddhism	5.26%
Islam	1.79%
Other or not stated	0.70%

Sudhagad taluka has a population of 62,380 according to the 2011 census. Sudhagad had a literacy rate of 68.29% and a sex ratio of 977 females per 1000 males. 6,775 (10.19%) are under 7 years of age. 9,176 (14.71%) lived in urban areas. Scheduled Castes and Scheduled Tribes make up 4.56% and 28.62% of the population respectively.

Languages of Sudhagad taluk (2011)
1. Marathi (93.14%)
2. 'Other' Marathi (3.1%)
3. Hindi (1.77%)
4. Others (1.99%)

At the time of the 2011 Census of India, 93.14% of the population in the taluka spoke Marathi and 1.77% Hindi as their first language. 3.10% of the population recorded their language as 'Others' under Marathi.
