= Khalapur taluka =

- Taluka
- Location in the Maharashtra state of India Khalapur taluka (India)
- Coordinates: 18.830°N 73.284°E
- Country: India
- State: Maharashtra
- Division: Konkan
- District: Raigad
- Headquarters: Khopoli

Government
  - Body: Panchayat Samiti Khalapur District Raigad
  - President: Ms. Kanchan Parange
  - Tehsildar: Ayub Tamboli
  - MP: Shrirang Barne (Maval Constituency)
  - MLA: Mahendra Thorve (Karjat constituency)

Area
  - Total: 1,503.61 km^{2} (580.55 sq mi)

Population (2011)
  - Total: 207,464
  - Density: 137.977/km^{2} (357.359/sq mi)
- Demonym: Khalapurkar

Language
- Time zone: UTC+5:30 (IST)
- PIN: 410201
- Telephone code: 02148
- Vehicle registration: MH-46, MH-06

Khalapur taluka is a subdistrict/upazila/tehsil in Raigad district of Maharashtra. The headquarters of the taluka is Khalapur village. This taluka belongs to the Karjat sub-division, and comprises 130 villages, 5 revenue circles and 25 sajas. 56 villages of this taluka come under NAINA. Khalapur toll naka is one of the busiest tolls in the state as it serves as an important transit point for goods from the Nhava Sheva port to automative and industrial belt of Pimpri-Chinchwad.

== Raigad district ==
As of August 2015, there are 8 sub-divisions, 15 talukas, 1970 villages, 60 revenue circles and 350 sazzas in Raigad district. The talukas being: Alibag, Karjat, Khalapur, Mahad, Mangaon, Mhasala, Murud, Panvel, Pen, Poladpur, Roha, Shrivardhan, Sudhagad-Pali, Tala and Uran.

== Demographics ==
Religions in Khalapur taluk (2011)
| Religion | Percent |
| Hinduism | 83.58% |
| Islam | 7.57% |
| Buddhism | 6.86% |
| Christianity | 0.66% |
| Jainism | 0.65% |
| Other or not stated | 0.68% |

Khalapur taluka has a population of 207,464 according to the 2011 census. Khalapur had a literacy rate of 82.27% and a sex ratio of 899 females per 1000 males. 24,369 (11.75%) are under 7 years of age. 95,964 (46.26%) lived in urban areas. Scheduled Castes and Scheduled Tribes make up 6.50% and 14.84% of the population respectively.

Languages of Khalapur taluk (2011)
1. Marathi (76.5%)
2. Hindi (11.4%)
3. Urdu (3.43%)
4. Kannada (2.19%)
5. 'Other' Marathi (1.17%)
6. Marwari (0.99%)
7. Gujarati (0.90%)
8. Others (3.36%)

At the time of the 2011 Census of India, 76.52% of the population in the district spoke Marathi, 11.44% Hindi, 3.43% Urdu, 2.19% Kannada, 0.99% Marwari and 0.90% Gujarati as their first language. 1.17% of the population spoke 'Others' under Marathi as their first language.

== Industries in Khalapur taluka ==
- Khopoli Power House.
- IOC
- Alta
- MUSCO

== Tourist attractions and pilgrimage centres ==
- Adlabs Imagica.
- Varadvinayak Ashtavinayak temple.
- Ashram (math) of Gagangiri Maharaj.
