= Phansad Wildlife Sanctuary =

Wildlife sanctuary in India

- IUCN category IV (habitat/species management area)
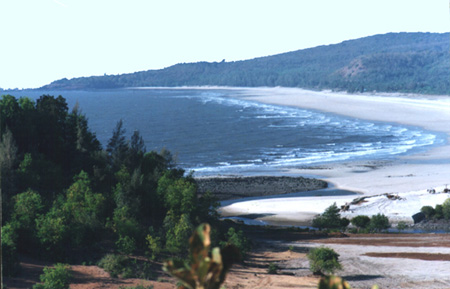
- Phansad Wildlife Sanctuary Landscape

- Location within Maharashtra Location within India
- Interactive map of Phansad Wildlife Sanctuary
- Location: Raigad District, Murud taluka and Roha taluka, Maharashtra
- Nearest city: Alibag
- Coordinates: 18°25′00″N 72°56′00″E
- Area: 8,436 ha (20,850 acres)
- Established: 1982

Phansad Wildlife Sanctuary (Marathi: फणसाड वन्यजीव अभयारण्य) is a wildlife sanctuary in the Murud and Roha talukas of Raigad district, Maharashtra state, India. It was created in 1986 to preserve some of the coastal woodland ecosystem of the Western Ghats and consists of 6,979 ha (17,250 acres) of forest, grasslands and wetlands. The area was once part of the hunting reserves of the princely state of Murud-Janjira.

== Geography ==
The Phansad Wildlife Sanctuary is located some 140 km (87 mi) from Mumbai. It is situated between Roha, Murud-Janjira and Alibaug talukas of Raigarh district. There are four main trails through the sanctuary that take in the main waterholes, Ghunyacha Maal, Chikhalgaan and Phansadgaan, that are some of the best places to see wildlife. The "Sacred Grove" (Devrai) is located near Supegaon. Pockets of open grassland, called maals, occur throughout the sanctuary. The places of natural water sources in the sanctuary are called "Gaan". The sanctuary is best approachable by road from Murud-Janjira and Roha. The nearest rail head is Roha.

== History ==
Before independence this sanctuary was private hunting Game reserve of Siddhi Nawab of Janjira State in Murud-Janjira. The entire area was deemed reserved forest under section 4 of the Indian Forest Act, 1927. The major part of the present day sanctuary was a part of Phansad working Circle. The sanctuary was declared on 25-2-1986 vide Government of Maharashtra notification WLP/1085/CR-75/F-5 Dt. 25.2.1986. The final notification declaring eco sensitive zone around the Phansad sanctuary was made by Government vide Notification 105.S.O. 1603 (E) dated 17.05.2017. The Eco-Sensitive Zone (ESZ) is spread over an area of 10.96 km^{2} around the sanctuary. About 43 villages of Murud taluka and Roha taluka are part of the eco-sensitive zone. The management plan for Phansad wildlife sanctuary is approved vide letter Desk-22(8)/WL/M Plan/CR-166 Part14/2988/17-18 on 21/12/2017 for the year 2016–17 to 2025–26 by the Government of India.

== Ecosystems ==
- coastal woodland ecosystem of the Western Ghats

== Biodiversity ==
The sanctuary is rich in flora and fauna. The forest types are semi-evergreen, evergreen, mixed deciduous and dry deciduous forests, grasslands and coast.

=== Faunal diversity ===
The sanctuary has a small population of Indian giant squirrel which is fragmented from the Western ghats. The fauna include 16 species of mammals, more than 200 species of birds, 17 reptiles, 47 insects and 27 marine invertebrates. The White-rumped vulture (Gyps bengalensis) which is noted as critically endangered is also found in the sanctuary. Representative fauna include:

- Indian giant squirrel Or Malabar Giant Squirrel (Ratufa indica)
- Indian muntjac (barking deer)
- Gaur (Bos Gaurus)
- Dhole ("Cuon alpinus")
- Indian crested porcupine (Hystrix indica)
- Indian leopard (Panthera pardus)
- Indian pangolin ("Manis crassicaudata")
- Sambar (Cervus unicolour)
- Lesser false vampire bat ("Megaderma spasma")
- Mouse deer (Tragulus meminna)
- Python ("Python molurus")
- Bombay earth snake (Uropeltis macrolepis)
- Giri's bronzeback tree snake ("Dendrelaphis girii")
- Southern Birdwing ("Troides minos")

Avifauna includes:

- Sri Lanka frogmouth
- Spot-bellied eagle-owl

=== Floral diversity ===
The forest on the top hill of the sanctuary are evergreen which include mostly Anjan (Memecylon umbellatum) and Phansada (Garcinia talbootii), while those on the slopes are dry deciduous which include ain, kinjal, teak, hirda, jamba, mango, and various ficus. The sanctuary has 710 species of plants which include 179 species of trees, 66 shrubs, and 141 herbs (Marathe 2004).

== Gallery ==
=== Animals in the Sanctuary ===
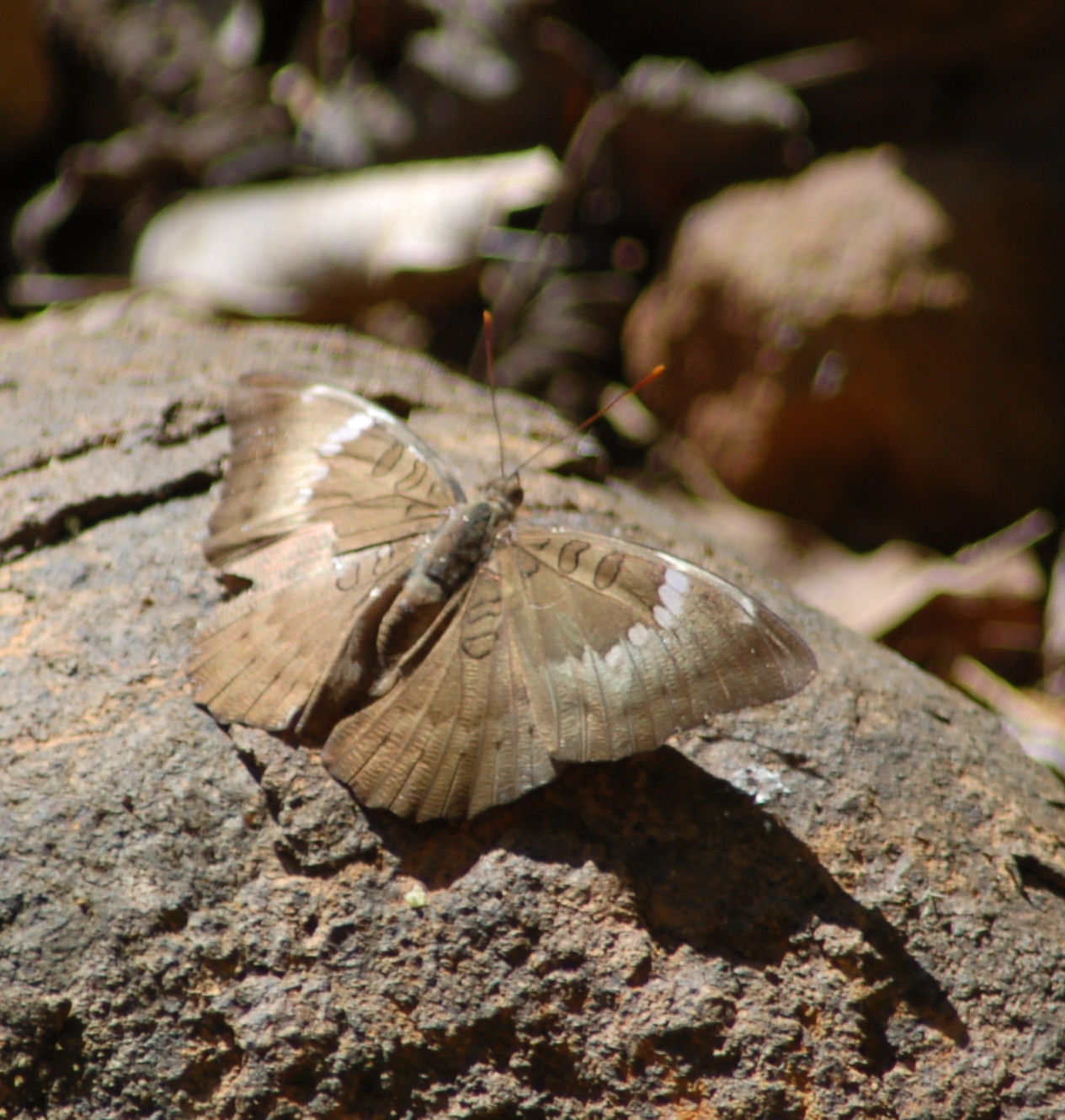

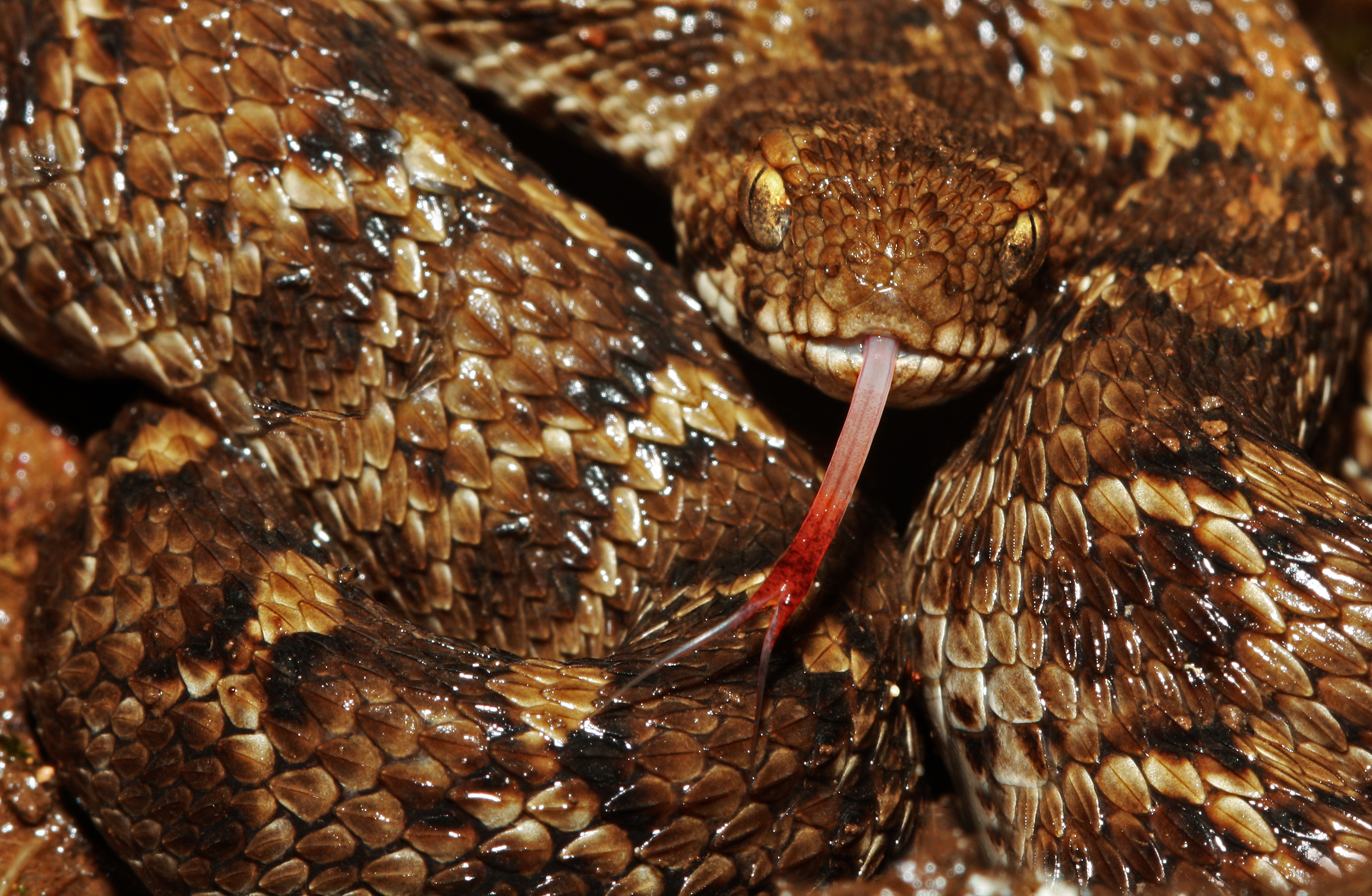

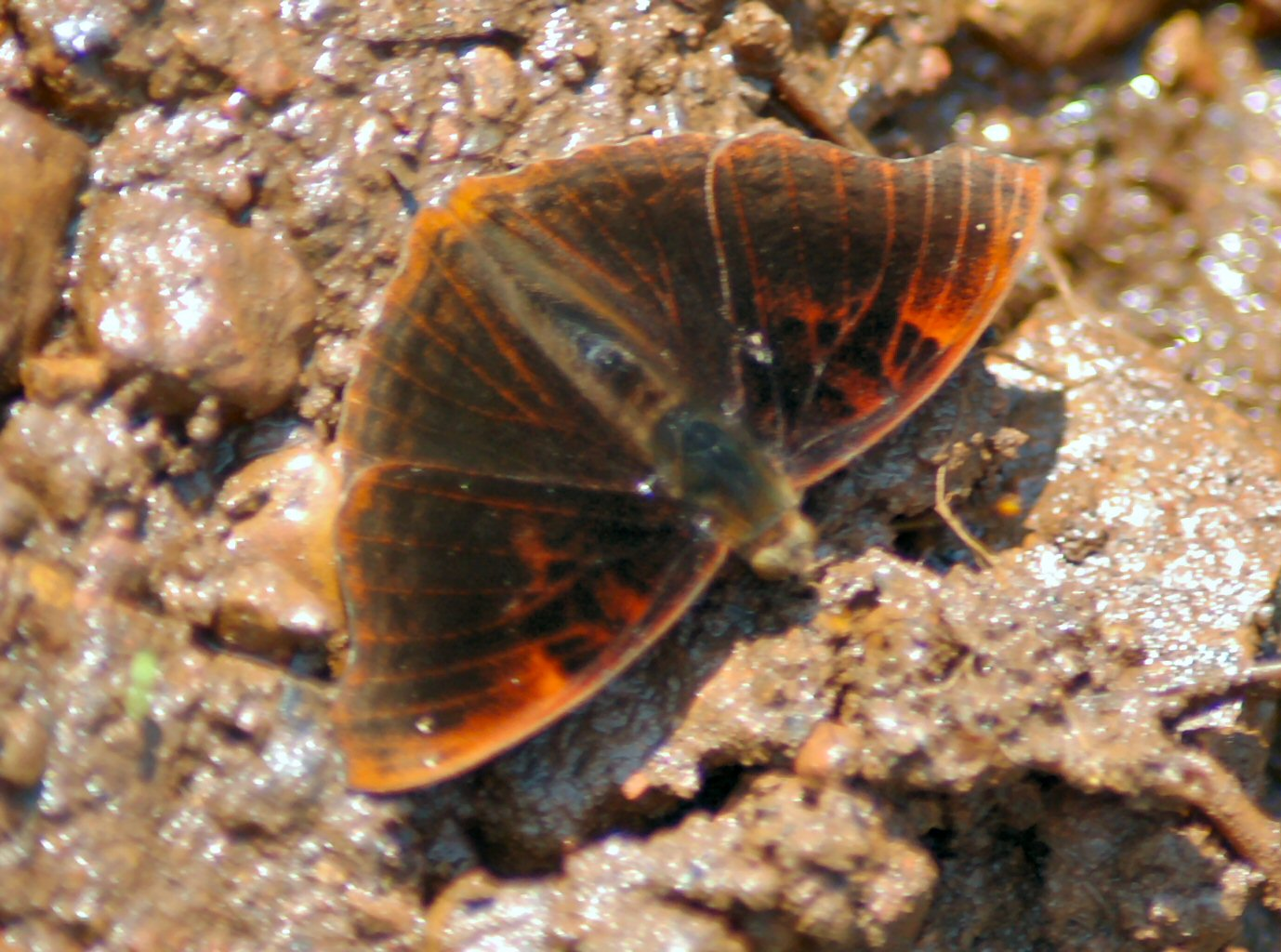

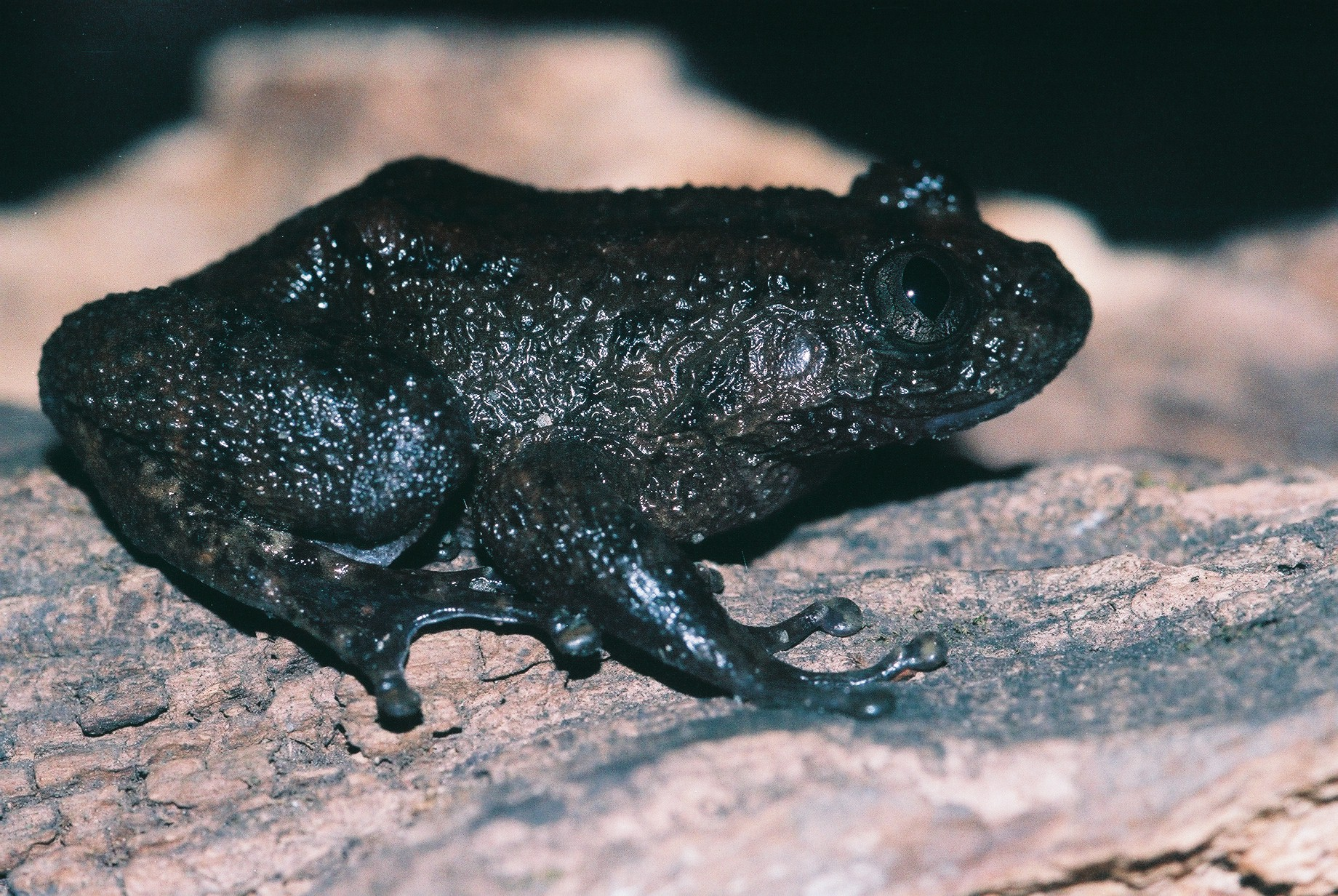

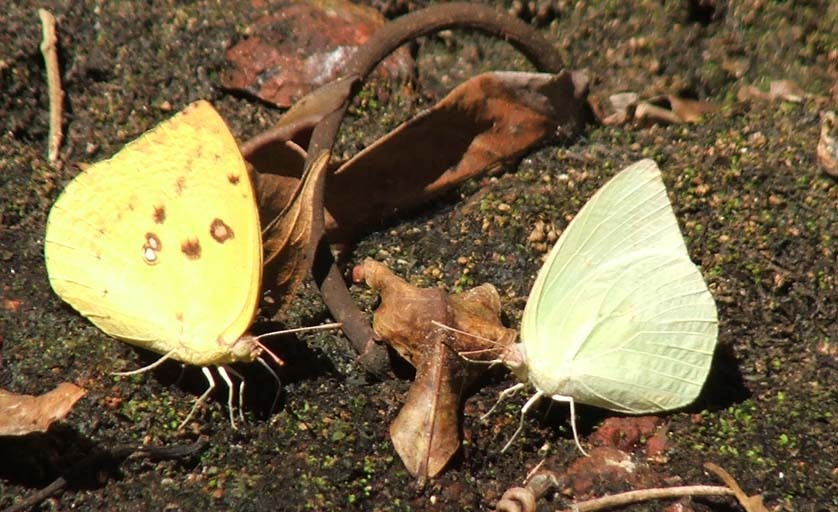

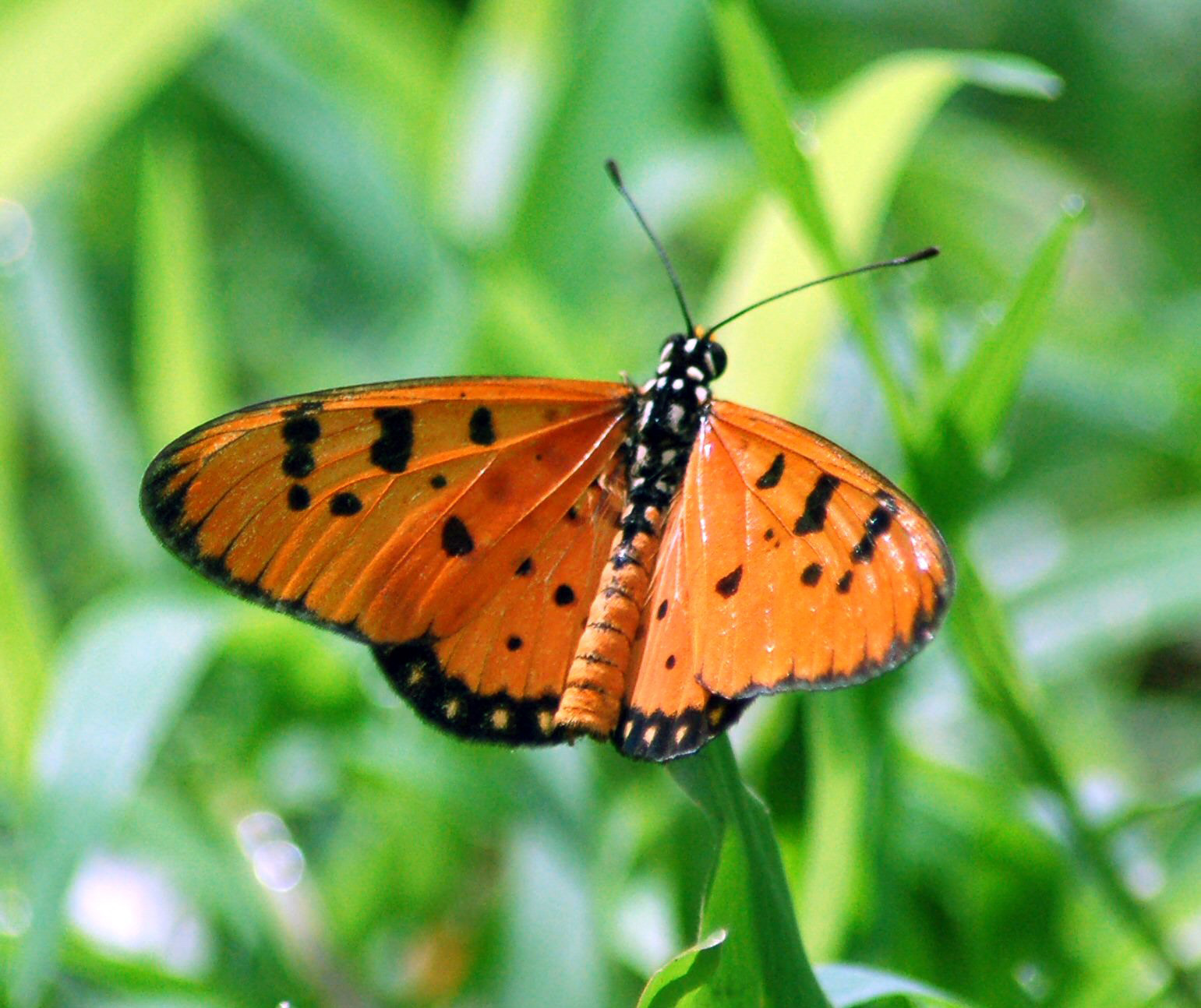
