= Pen taluka =

Taluka in Maharashtra India

Pen
- Taluka
- Location in the Maharashtra state of India
- Coordinates: 18.739°N 73.097°E
- Country: India
- State: Maharashtra
- Division: Konkan Division
- District: Raigad
- Headquarters: Pen

Government
  - Body: Panchayat Samiti Pen Raigad
  - Chairperson: NA
  - Tehsildar: NA
  - MP: Sunil Tatkare (Raigad Constituency)
  - MLA: Ravisheth Patil (Pen constituency)

Area
  - Total: 1,503.61 km^{2} (580.55 sq mi)

Population (2001)
  - Total: 205,585
  - Density: 136.728/km^{2} (354.123/sq mi)
- Demonym: Penkar

Language
- Time zone: UTC+5:30 (IST)
- PIN: 410206/ 410217/ 410208/410218
- Telephone code: 02141
- Vehicle registration: MH-46, MH-06

Pen taluka is a subdistrict/upazila/tehsil in Raigad district of the Indian state of Maharashtra.

== Raigad district ==
As of August 2015, there were 8 sub-divisions, 15 talukas, 1970 villages, 60 revenue circled and 350 sazzas in Raigad district. The talukas being Alibag, Karjat, Khalapur, Mahad, Mangaon, Mhasala, Murud, Panvel, Pen, Poladpur, Roha, Shrivardhan, Sudhagad-Pali, Tala and Uran.

== Demographics ==
Religions in Pen taluk (2011)
Religion	Percent
Hinduism	95.48%
Islam	1.79%
Buddhism	1.75%
Other or not stated	0.98%

Pen taluka has a population of 195,454 according to the 2011 census. Pen had a literacy rate of 77.90% and a sex ratio of 963 females per 1000 males. 21,884 (11.20%) are under 7 years of age. 12,216 (16.46%) lived in urban areas. Scheduled Castes and Scheduled Tribes make up 2.28% and 16.58% of the population respectively.

Languages of Pen taluk (2011)
1. Marathi (92.2%)
2. Hindi (2.46%)
3. 'Other' Marathi (2.02%)
4. Urdu (0.93%)
5. Others (2.35%)

At the time of the 2011 Census of India, 92.24% of the population in the taluka spoke Marathi, 2.46% Hindi and 0.93% Urdu as their first language. 2.02% of the population recorded their language as 'Others' under Marathi.
