= Mhasala taluka =

Taluka in Raigad district, Maharashtra, India

Mhasala Taluka is a subdistrict/upazila/tehsil in the Raigad district of Maharashtra an Indian state. Its villages are Newarul, Jambhul, Kelte, Ghum, Sangwad, Thakroli, Kokbal, Banoti, Kharasai, Revali, Tondsure, Agarwada, Pedambe, Saklap, Jangamvadi, Varavathane, and Ganeshnagar.

== Raigad district ==
As of August 2015, there were 8 sub-divisions, 15 talukas, 1970 villages, 60 revenue circles and 350 sazzas in the Raigad district. The talukas are Alibag, Karjat, Khalapur, Mahad, Mangaon, Mhasala, Murud, Panvel, Pen, Poladpur, Roha, Shrivardhan, Sudhagad Pali, Tala and Uran.

== Demographics ==
Religions in Mhasala taluk (2011)
Religion	Percent
Hinduism	68.98%
Islam	25.13%
Buddhism	5.51%
Other or not stated	0.38%

Mhasala taluka has a population of 59,914 according to the 2011 census. Mhasala had a literacy rate of 80.34% and a sex ratio of 1166 females per 1000 males. 7,280 (12.15%) are under 7 years of age. 9,679 (16.15%) lived in urban areas. Scheduled Castes and Scheduled Tribes make up 5.50% and 7.66% of the population respectively.

Languages of Mhasala taluk (2011)
1. Marathi (73.4%)
2. Urdu (23.2%)
3. Hindi (1.74%)
4. Others (1.68%)

At the time of the 2011 Census of India, 73.40% of the population in the taluka spoke Marathi, 23.18% Urdu and 1.74% Hindi as their first language.
