= Tala taluka =

Tala taluka is a taluka in Raigad district of Maharashtra an Indian state.

== Raigad district ==
As of August 2015, there were 8 sub-divisions, 15 talukas, 1970 villages, 60 revenue circles and 350 sazzas in Raigad district. The talukas being Alibag, Karjat, Khalapur, Mahad, Mangaon, Mhasala, Murud, Panvel, Pen, Poladpur, Roha, Shrivardhan, Sudhagad Pali, Tala and Uran.

== Demographics ==
Religions in Tala taluk (2011)
Religion	Percent
Hinduism	83.04%
Buddhism	10.75%
Islam	5.89%
Other or not stated	0.32%

Tala taluka has a population of 40,619 according to the 2011 census. Tala had a literacy rate of 75.74% and a sex ratio of 1111 females per 1000 males. 4,225 (10.40%) are under 7 years of age. The entire population lives in rural areas. Scheduled Castes and Scheduled Tribes make up 8.24% and 11.30% of the population respectively.

Languages of Tala taluk (2011)
1. Marathi (92.1%)
2. Urdu (5.41%)
3. 'Other' Marathi (1.44%)
4. Others (1.09%)

At the time of the 2011 Census of India, 92.06% of the population in the taluka spoke Marathi and 5.41% Urdu as their first language. 1.44% of the population recorded their language as 'Others' under Marathi.
