= Panvel taluka =

Panvel
- Taluka
- Location in the Maharashtra state of India
- Coordinates: 18.989°N 73.116°E
- Country: India
- State: Maharashtra
- Division: Konkan
- District: Raigad
- Headquarters: Panvel

Government
  - Body: Panchayat Samiti Panvel Raigad
  - Chairperson: NA
  - Tehsildar: NA
  - MP: Shrirang Barne (Maval Constituency)
  - MLA: Prashant Thakur (Panvel constituency)

Area
  - Total: 1,503.61 km^{2} (580.55 sq mi)

Population (2001)
  - Total: 205,585
  - Density: 136.728/km^{2} (354.123/sq mi)
- Demonym: PANVELKAR

Language
- Time zone: UTC+5:30 (IST)
- PIN: 410206/ 410217/ 410208/410218
- Telephone code: 02141
- Vehicle registration: MH-46, MH-06

Panvel taluka is a subdistrict/upazila/tehsil in Raigad district of the Indian state of Maharashtra.

== Raigad district ==
As of August 2015, there were 8 sub-divisions, 15 talukas, 1970 villages, 60 revenue circles and 350 sazzas in Raigad district. The talukas being Alibag, Karjat, Khalapur, Mahad, Mangaon, Mhasala, Murud, Panvel, Pen, Poladpur, Roha, Shrivardhan, Sudhagad-Pali, Tala and Uran.

== Demographics ==
Religions in Panvel taluk (2011)
| Religion | Percent |
| Hinduism | 82.79% |
| Islam | 8.47% |
| Buddhism | 5.45% |
| Christianity | 1.48% |
| Sikhism | 0.82% |
| Jainism | 0.53% |
| Other or not stated | 0.46% |

Panvel taluka has a population of 750,236 according to the 2011 census. Panvel had a literacy rate of 87.77% and a sex ratio of 889 females per 1000 males. 94,362 (12.58%) are under 7 years of age. 497,759 (66.59%) lived in urban areas. Scheduled Castes and Scheduled Tribes make up 6.64% and 6.42% of the population respectively.

Languages of Panvel taluk (2011)
1. Marathi (66.1%)
2. Hindi (14.6%)
3. Urdu (4.17%)
4. Malayalam (2.06%)
5. Gujarati (1.85%)
6. Bengali (1.35%)
7. Kannada (1.34%)
8. Bhojpuri (1.11%)
9. Punjabi (1.06%)
10. Tamil (0.94%)
11. Others (5.44%)

At the time of the 2011 Census of India, 66.10% of the population in the district spoke Marathi, 14.58% Hindi, 4.17% Urdu, 2.06% Malayalam, 1.85% Gujarati, 1.35% Bengali, 1.34% Kannada, 1.11% Bhojpuri, 1.06% Punjabi and 0.94% Tamil as their first language.
