= Uran taluka =

Township in Maharashtra, India

Uran
- Taluka
- Location in the Maharashtra state of India
- Coordinates: 18.884°N 72.934°E
- Country: India
- State: Maharashtra
- Division: Konkan
- District: Raigad
- Headquarters: Uran

Government
  - Body: Panchayat Samiti Uran Raigad
  - Chairperson: NA
  - Tehsildar: Shri. Bhausaheb Andhare
  - MP: Shrirang Barne (Maval Constituency)
  - MLA: Mahesh Baldi (Pen constituency)

Area
  - Total: 1,503.61 km^{2} (580.55 sq mi)

Population (2011)
  - Total: 160,303
  - Density: 106.612/km^{2} (276.124/sq mi)
- Demonym: Uranakar

Language
- Time zone: UTC+5:30 (IST)
- PIN: 400702
- Telephone code: 02141
- Vehicle registration: MH-46, MH-06

Uran taluka is a subdistrict/upazila/tehsil in Raigad district of the Indian state of Maharashtra.

== Raigad district ==
As of August 2015, there were 8 sub-divisions, 15 talukas, 1970 villages, 60 revenue circles and 350 sazzas in Raigad district. The talukas are Alibag, Karjat, Khalapur, Mahad, Mangaon, Mhasala, Murud, Panvel, Pen, Poladpur, Roha, Shrivardhan, Sudhagad-Pali, Tala and Uran.

== Demographics ==
Religions in Uran taluk (2011)
Religion	Percent
Hinduism	90.31%
Islam	6.04%
Buddhism	2.16%
Christianity	0.76%
Other or not stated	0.73%

Uran taluka has a population of 160,303 according to the 2011 census. Uran had a literacy rate of 85.69% and a sex ratio of 934 females per 1000 males. 18,784 (11.72%) are under 7 years of age. 69,475 (43.34%) lived in urban areas. Scheduled Castes and Scheduled Tribes make up 4.47% and 4.76% of the population respectively.

Languages of Uran taluk (2011)
1. Marathi (82.5%)
2. Hindi (8.18%)
3. Urdu (3.05%)
4. Others (6.28%)

At the time of the 2011 Census of India, 82.49% of the population in the district spoke Marathi, 8.18% Hindi, 3.05% Urdu as their first language.
