= Murud taluka =

Taluka in Maharashtra India

Murud
- Taluka
- Location in the Maharashtra state of India
- Coordinates: 18.329°N 72.960°E
- Country: India
- State: Maharashtra
- Division: Konkan Division
- District: Raigad
- Headquarters: Murud, Raigad

Government
  - Body: Panchayat Samiti Murud Raigad
  - Chairperson: Mrs. Nita Nilesh Dhatwal
  - Tehsildar: -
  - MP: Sunil Tatkare (Raigad Constituency)
  - MLA: Mahendra Dalvi (Alibag constituency)

Area
  - Total: 1,503.61 km^{2} (580.55 sq mi)

Population (2001)
  - Total: 205,585
  - Density: 136.728/km^{2} (354.123/sq mi)
- Demonym: Murudkar

Language
- Time zone: UTC+5:30 (IST)
- PIN: 402401
- Telephone code: 02141
- Vehicle registration: MH-46, MH-06

Murud taluka is a subdistrict/upazila/tehsil in Raigad district of the Indian state of Maharashtra.

== Raigad district ==
As of August 2015, there were 8 sub-divisions, 15 talukas, 1970 villages, 60 revenue circles and 350 sazzas in Raigad district. The talukas being Alibag, Karjat, Khalapur, Mahad, Mangaon, Mhasala, Murud, Panvel, Pen, Poladpur, Roha, Shrivardhan, Sudhagad Pali, Tala and Uran.

== Demographics ==
Religions in Murud taluk (2011)
Religion	Percent
Hinduism	76.34%
Islam	20.33%
Buddhism	1.58%
Christianity	1.20%
Other or not stated	0.55%

Murud taluka has a population of 74,207 according to the 2011 census. Murud had a literacy rate of 83.49% and a sex ratio of 1039 females per 1000 males. 7,561 (10.19%) are under 7 years of age. 12,216 (16.46%) lived in urban areas. Scheduled Castes and Scheduled Tribes make up 2.54% and 18.30% of the population respectively.

Languages of Murud taluk (2011)
1. Marathi (73.8%)
2. Urdu (19.0%)
3. 'Other' Marathi (2.34%)
4. Hindi (2.01%)
5. Others (2.90%)

At the time of the 2011 Census of India, 73.76% of the population in the taluka spoke Marathi, 18.99% Urdu and 2.01% Hindi as their first language. 2.34% of the population recorded their language as 'Others' under Marathi.
