= Roha taluka =

Taluka in Raigad district, Maharashtra

Roha taluka is a taluka in Raigad district of Maharashtra an Indian state.

== Raigad district ==
As of August 2015, there were 8 sub-divisions, 15 talukas, 1970 villages, 60 revenue circles and 350 sazzas in Raigad district. The talukas being Alibag, Karjat, Khalapur, Mahad, Mangaon, Mhasala, Murud, Panvel, Pen, Poladpur, Roha, Shrivardhan, Sudhagad Pali, Tala and Uran.

== Demographics ==
Religions in Roha taluk (2011)
Religion	Percent
Hinduism	88.49%
Islam	6.99%
Buddhism	3.19%
Jainism	0.75%
Other or not stated	0.58%

Roha taluka has a population of 167,110 according to the 2011 census. Roha had a literacy rate of 81.52% and a sex ratio of 951 females per 1000 males. 17,763 (10.63%) are under 7 years of age. 47,335 (28.33%) lived in urban areas. Scheduled Castes and Scheduled Tribes make up 4.08% and 13.12% of the population respectively.

Languages of Roha taluk (2011)
1. Marathi (85.2%)
2. Urdu (5.41%)
3. Hindi (4.55%)
4. Others (4.89%)

At the time of the 2011 Census of India, 85.23% of the population in the taluka spoke Marathi, 5.41% Urdu and 4.55% Hindi as their first language.
