= Third Mumbai =

Proposed city in Maharashtra

Third Mumbai KSC New Town
- City
- Karnala-Sai-Chirner New Town
- Interactive map of Third Mumbai
- Country: India
- State: Maharashtra
- District: Raigad and Thane
- Region: Mumbai Metropolitan Region
- Nodal Agency: Mumbai Metropolitan Region Development Authority

Government
  - Type: Executive Agency
  - Body: New Town Development Authority

Area
  - Total: 324 km^{2} (125 sq mi)

Third Mumbai officially named as Karnala-Sai-Chirner New Town also known as KSC New Town is a proposed city in the state of Maharashtra in India. It includes the notified areas within the influence zone of Mumbai Trans Harbour Link (MTHL also known as Atal Setu) and Navi Mumbai Airport Influence Notified Area (NAINA).

== History ==
Third Mumbai was announced in 2013 to prevent haphazard development of the upcoming Navi Mumbai International Airport area. It was previously known as Navi Mumbai Airport Influence Notified Area (NAINA). After the inauguration of the sea link bridge between Mumbai and Navi Mumbai called as Atal Setu also known as Mumbai Trans Harbour Link, the notified area around the bridge was also included in the project of NAINA and collectively these areas was called as Third Mumbai. On 21 October 2024, the nodal agency MMRDA for the proposed city officially named the city of Third Mumbai as Karnala-Sai-Chirner New Town on the name of the three renowned villages Karnala, Sai and Chirner in the areas of the proposed city. In short form it is called as KSC New Town.

== Planning and development ==
The aim of the planning for Third Mumbai was to provide better housing, infrastructure and robust transport facilities to the increasing population of the Mumbai Metropolitan Region in the state of Maharashtra. On 7 December 2024, the chief minister Devendra Fadnavis at a program India Business Leader Awards (IBLA) held by CNBC-TV18, highlighted the development of a new business district in the region of the Third Mumbai. He said that the area of the Third Mumbai would be three times the size of the current city of Mumbai. He also said "This will be the next business capital of India"

The government of Maharashtra is planning to set up the proposed city as a global city. In the city, sector-specific areas and innovation centres would be developed, which will include Edu City, Medi City, Global Capability Centres (GCC) and Data Centres, etc. In the areas of the Edu City, the world's top five universities campuses are expected to be established. The Edu City will be the education hub of the proposed city.

The Indian Railway is planning for the extension of the Mumbai Suburban railway in the region of Third Mumbai. The Indian Railway is planning for construction of corridors in the region of Third Mumbai through the Mumbai Urban Transport Project Phase (MUTP)-4.
