= Rumewadi =

- Village
- Country: India
- State: Karnataka
- District: Belgaum
- Talukas: Khanapur

Languages
  - Official: Kannada
- Time zone: UTC+5:30 (IST)

The village of Rumewadi is situated in the Khanapur taluka of the Belgaum district in the Indian state of Karnataka. The village is roughly 2 km from the Khanapur sub-district headquarters (tehsildar office) and 27 km from the Belgaum district headquarters. Rumewadi's location code, or village code, is 597868, based on the 2011 Census. Karmbla is the gram panchayat for Rumewadi.

Rumewadi covers a total of 294.67 hectares of land. The population of the settlement is 1,745 as of 2009, consisting of 868 males and 877 females. In Rumewadi, the literacy rate is 71.00%, with 77.88% of men and 64.20 percent of women being literate. The community is home to about 383 households. Rumewadi's postal code is 591302.
