= Navi Mumbai Airport Influence Notified Area =

Proposed planning area in Raigad district, Maharashtra, India

Agency overview
- Formed: 2013
- Type: Special Planning Authority
- Jurisdiction: Panvel, Uran
- Headquarters: Belapur Railway Station Complex, CBD Belapur, Navi Mumbai, Maharashtra
- Minister responsible: Eknath Shinde, Minister for Urban Development
- Agency executives: Lokesh Chandra IAS IAS, Vice Chairman and Managing Director; Venugopal Vedula, Chief Planner
- Parent agency: Government of Maharashtra
- Website: www.cidco.maharashtra.gov.in

Navi Mumbai Airport Influence Notified Area (NAINA) is a proposed planning area in Raigad district of Maharashtra, an Indian state. City and Industrial Development Corporation of Maharashtra Limited (CIDCO) has been appointed the planning authority for the same. It comprises approximate 170 villages in Pen, Panvel, and Uran talukas of Raigad district. The city will consist of small cities that will be hubs for agro-farming, education, trade, information technology, services, medical treatment, etc. This city is being developed in fulfilment of the conditions under which environmental clearances were given by the Ministry of Environmental & Forest (MoEF), Government of India that development plan for Navi Mumbai be modified to prevent unplanned development in the vicinity of the proposed airport. NAINA enjoys proximity to Navi Mumbai and has influence of Navi Mumbai International Airport (NMIA), JNPT (Jawaharlal Nehru Port Trust) and proposed transport corridors viz. Multi Modal Corridor, Mumbai Trans Harbor Link (MTHL), Dedicated Freight Corridor (DFC), SPUR etc.
