= Tala, Raigad =

Tala
- Village
- Country: India
- State: Maharashtra

Government
  - Type: Nagarpanchayat

Languages
  - Official: Marathi
- Time zone: UTC+5:30 (IST)
- Postal code: 402111
- Nearest city: Roha, Mangaon, Murud

Tala is a village and taluka in Tala subdivision of Raigad district of Maharashtra State in India. Tala is 15 km away from Indapur Town which is located on Mumbai-Goa Highway . Tala connected to indapur via National Highway 348 b.Talgad is main attraction of Tala which is one of the important fort in Raigad district. Chandika Mata Temple is located at Marketplace of Tala village. Tala is Marathi translation of word lake, and there were many lakes located in Tala village which is also the reason behind the name Tala.There are 63 Villages in Tala.
