= Mhasla =

- village
- Location in Maharashtra, India
- Coordinates: 18.13°N 73.12°E
- Country: India
- State: Maharashtra
- District: Raigad
- Elevation: 93 m (305 ft)

Population (2011)
  - Total: 59,914

Languages
  - Official: Marathi
- Time zone: UTC+5:30 (IST)
- PIN: 402105
- Telephone code: 2149232240
- Vehicle registration: MH-06
- Nearest city: Shrivardhan
- Lok Sabha constituency: Raigad
- Assemblyconstituency: Shrivardhan
- Avg. summer temperature: 36 °C (97 °F)
- Avg. winter temperature: 16 °C (61 °F)

Mhasla is a census town in Raigad district in the Indian state of Maharashtra.

== Geography ==
Mhasla is located at 18.13°N 73.12°E. It has an average elevation of 93 metres (305 feet).

== Demographics ==
As of 2011 India census, Mhasla had a population of 59,914. It is one hour away from the Mumbai-Goa Highway and 3 hours (190 km) from Mumbai.
