= Kalamb Karjat =

Kalamb
- Village
- Location within Maharashtra
- Coordinates: 19°01′28.57″N 73°18′56.58″E
- Country: India
- State: Maharashtra
- District: Raigad
- Taluka: Karjat
- Established: Year 1200
- Founded by: 1956

Government
  - Type: Gram Panchayat
  - Body: Gram Panchayat Kalamb
  - Sarpanch: Mr. Pramod Tukaram Kondilkar
  - Deputy Sarpanch: Mr. Santosh Vasant Modak
  - Leader of the House: Mr. Parkash Kaluram Nirguda
  - Leader of the Opposition: Mr. Shahid Sikandar Maste
  - Village Department Officer: Mr. Dhanaji Burud

Population (2015)
  - Total: 7,593
  - Density: 368/km^{2} (950/sq mi)

Languages
  - Official: Marathi
- Time zone: UTC+5:30 (IST)
- Postal code: 410101
- Vehicle registration: MH – 46
- Lok Sabha constituency: MP Shrirang Barne (Maval Constituency)
- Vidhan Sabha constituency: MLA Mahendra Thorve (Karjat constituency)
- Member of Raigad Zilla Parishad: Mr. Narayan Damse (Zilla Parishad Ward Kalamb)
- Member of Karjat Panchayat Samiti: Mrs. Kamalabai Shingwa (Panchayat Samiti Ward Kalamb)
- President Mahatma Gandhi Tanta Mukti Samiti Kalamb: Mr. Shankar Babu Gavli
- Police Patil in Village Kalamb: Mrs. Ashwani Arun Bade
- Assistant Police Inspector (Kalamb): Mr. Shembade
- Talathi Saja Kalamb: Mr. Eknathrao Raut

Kalamb is a town in Raigad district in the Indian state of Maharashtra.

Kalamb Gram Panchayat, Karjat, Raigad, Village of a Karjat Taluka, Raigad district which is well connected to Panvel, Mumbai, Thane and Pune, Karjat, Neral, India Kalamb along with Karjat is also known as Eastern Mumbai District.

== Government ==
Kalamb is a town in Raigad district in the Indian state of Maharashtra. Kalamb Gram Panchayat, Karjat, Raigad, Village of a Karjat Taluka, Raigad district

Gram Panchayat Kalamb Tal. Karjat Raigad ग्राम पंचायत कळंब ता कर्जत रायगड

Type
- Type: Gram Panchayat

History
- Founded: 1951

Leadership
- Sarpanch: Mr. Pramod Tukaram Kondilkar, SKP
- Deputy Sarpanch: Mr. Santosh Vasant Modak, SKP
- Leader of the House: Mr. Parkash Kaluram Nirguda, INC
- Leader of the Opposition: Mr. Shahid Sikandar Maste, NCP
- Village Development Office: Mr. Dhanaji Burud, Independent 2022
- Seats: 14

Elections
- Last election: 2022

Meeting place
- Gram Panchayat office Kalamb

kalamb Gram Panchayat This is the Part of Panchayat Samiti Karjat Raigad, Karjat in Raigad Zilla Parishad Alibag Raigad district, Maharashtra.

=== List of all currently a member of panchayat ===
Political party	Seats
Government	Gram Vikas Aghadi
Peasants and Workers Party of India	05 + 01 (Sarpanch) =06
Shiv Sena (Uddhav Balasaheb Thackeray) (B)	02
Indian National Congress (B)	02
total	09
Opposition	Maha Vikas Aghadi
Nationalist Congress Party	01
Indian National Congress (A)	02
Shiv Sena (Uddhav Balasaheb Thackeray) (A)	00
total	03
Others (A)	Single Party
Balasahebanchi Shiv Sena	02
total	02
Others (B)	Single Party
Bharatiya Janata Party	00
total	00
Independent politician	Single Group
Independent	00
total	00
Grand total	14

- Sarpanch

Mr. Pramod Tukaram Kondilkar (SKP) = Gram Vikas Aghadi

- Deputy Sarpanch And Member 3 - 2

Mr. Santosh Vasant Modak (SKP)
(Leader of the House) (2022 - 2025)

- 1 - 1 Member

Mr. Prasad Eknath Bade (BSS)

- 1 - 2 Member

Mrs. Ranjana Nilesh Wagh (INC) B

- 2 - 1 Member

Mr. Omprakash Shivram Bade (BSS)

- 2 - 2 Member

Mrs. Nirmala Ganesh Nirguda (SKP)

- 2 - 3 Member

Mrs. Reshma Ramesh Bade (SHS(UBT)) B

- 3 - 1 Member

Mr. Parkash Kaluram Nirguda (INC) B
(Deputy Sarpanch) (2022 - 2025) and
(Leader of the House) (2025 - Incumbent)

- 3 - 3 Member

Mrs. Taibai Palu Pardhi (SKP)

- 4 - 1 Member

Mr. Ambo Kashinath Pardhi (INC) A

- 4 - 2 Member

Mrs. Sugandha Shankar Mali (SHS(UBT)) B

- 4 - 3 Member

Mrs. Kanija Nisar Logde (INC) A

- 5 - 1 Member

Mr. Shahid Sikandar Maste (NCP)
(Leader of the Opposition)

- 5 - 2 Member

Mrs. Revta Lahu Dhole (SKP)(Ending April 2023)

Mrs. Karisma Sunil Dhole (SKP) (Starting 6 November 2023)

== Officer ==
Head Officer of Village Kalamb

Post	Name	Assumed office
Sarpanch सरपंच	Mr. Pramod Tukaram Kondilkar	20 December 2022
Deputy Sarpanch उपसरपंच	Mr. Santosh Vasant Modak	4 February 2025
Leader of the House सभागृह नेते	Mr. Parkash Kaluram Nirguda	4 February 2025
Leader of the Opposition विरोधी पक्षनेते	Mr. Shahid Sikandar Maste	2 January 2023
Gramsevak & Village Development Officer ग्रामसेवक व ग्रामविकास अधिकारी	Mr. Dhanaji Burud	4 October 2022
President Mahatma Gandhi Tanta Mukti Samiti अध्यक्ष महात्मा गांधी तांता मुक्ती समिती	Mr. Shankar Babu Gavli	2 October 2024
Police Patil Kalamb पोलिस पाटील कळंब	Ms. Ashwini Arun Bade	May 2012

== List of Sarpanch ==
- Mr. Namdev Pandurang Bade
- Mr. Ajid Logde
- Mr. Namdev Pandurang Bade
- Mr. Krishna Pandharintha Bade
- Mr. Dharma Nirguda
- Mrs. Revta Lahu Dhole

(2007 - 2012)

- Mr. Pramod Tukaram Kondilkar

(2012 - 2015)

- Mr. Faik Ahmed Khan

(2015 - 2017)

- Mrs. Madhuri Moreshwar Bade

(2017 - 17 December 2022)

- Mr. Pramod Tukaram Kondilkar (SKP)

(20 December 2022 - Incumbent)

== List of Deputy Sarpanch ==
- Mr. Namdev jitu Bade

(2007 - 2012)

- Mrs. Smita Jeevan Modak

(2012 - 2017)

- Mr. Rahul Shankarsingh Pardesi

(2017 - 17 December 2022)

- Mr. Parkash Kaluram Nirguda (INC)

(2 January 2023 - 4 February 2025)

- Mr. Santosh Vasant Modak (SKP)

(4 February 2025 - Incumbent)

== List of Leader of the House ==
- Mrs. Geeta Jagannay Shelke (INC)

(2017 - 17 December 2022)

- Mr. Santosh Vasant Modak (SKP)

(2 January 2023 - 4 February 2025)

- Mr. Parkash Kaluram Nirguda (INC)

(4 February 2025 - Incumbent)

== List of Leader of the Opposition ==
- Mr. Arun Namdev Bade

(2012 - 2017)

- Mr. Ashok Govind Devilkar

(2017 - 2019)

- Mrs. Rekha Sagar Bade

(2019 - 2022)

- Mr. Shahid Sikandar Maste (NCP)

(2 January 2023 - Incumbent)

== List of Village Development Officer ==
- Mr. Ganesh Bahde

(2018 - 2021)

- Mrs. S. P. Babanle

(2021 - 4 October 2022)

- Mr. Dhanaji Burud

(4 October 2022 - Incumbent)

== List of President Tanta Mukti Samiti ==
- Mr. Ayub Ghulam Rasool Koilkar

(15 August 2019 - 15 August 2023)

- Mr. Jarnadan Govind Bade

(15 August 2023- 22 August 2024)

- Sarpanch Mr. Pramod Tukaram Kondilkar
  (In-Charge)

(22 August 2024 - 2 October 2024)

- Mr. Shankar Babu Gavli

(2 October 2024 - Incumbent)

== 2017 Kalamb Sarpanch and Member Gram Panchayat Election ==
2017 Kalamb Sarpanch and Member Gram Panchayat Election (थेट सरपंच व सदस्य निवडनुक ग्राम पंचायत कळंब २०१७ )

All 16 seats to the Kalamb Gram Panchayat 9 seats needed for a majority

	Majority party	Minority party
Leader	Ms. Madurai Moreshwar Bade	Ms. Swati Shivram Bade
Party	Peasants and Workers Party of India	Shiv Sena
Alliance	United Progressive Alliance	National Democratic Alliance
Leader's seat	Direct Sarpanch	Direct Sarpanch
Last election	5	7
Percentage	%
Sarpanch before election
Mr. Faik Ahmed Khan
SS
Elected Sarpanch
Ms. Madurai Bade
PWPI

Executive branch (2017 - 2022)

- Sarpanch

Mrs. Madhuri Morehwar bade

- Deputy Sarpanch and 4 - 2 Member

Mr. Rahul Shankarsingh Pardesi

- 1 - 1 Member

Mr. Kishor kishan Dhule

- 1 - 2 Member

Mr. Naresh Krishna Bade

- 1 - 3 Member

Mrs. Geeta Jagannay Shelke
(Leader of the House)

- 2 - 1 Member

Mr. Ashok Govind Devilkar
(Leader of the Opposition) (2017 - 2019)

- 2 - 2 Member

Mrs. Jayanti Deepak Mirkute

- 2 - 3 Member

Mrs. Shamin Manzoor Logde

- 3 - 1 Member

Mr. Parkash Kaluram Nirguda

- 3 - 2 Member

Mrs. Neelam Vasant Dhole

- 3 - 3 Member

Mrs. Janaki Kamlu Pardhi

- 4 - 2 Member

Mrs. Mina Shankar Nirguda

- 5 - 1 Member

Mr. Rupesh Dashrath Wadh

- 5 - 2 Member

Mrs. Rekha Sagar Bade
(Leader of the Opposition) (2019 - 2022)

== 2022 Kalamb Sarpanch and Member Gram Panchayat Election ==
2022 Kalamb Sarpanch and Member Gram Panchayat Election (थेट सरपंच व सदस्य निवडनुक ग्राम पंचायत कळंब २०२२ )
- 18 December 2022

All 16 seats to the Kalamb Gram Panchayat 9 seats needed for a majority
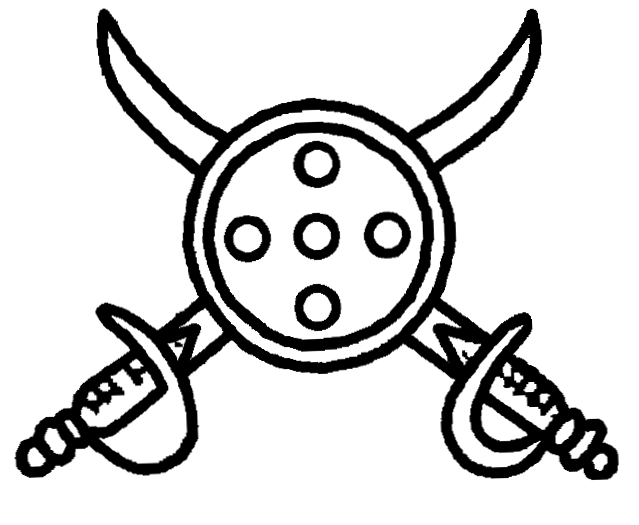

	Majority party	Minority party	Third party
Leader	Mr. Arun Bade	Mr. Ramchandra Bade	Mr. Pramod Kondilkar
Party	Nationalist Congress Party	Balasahebanchi Shiv Sena	PWPI
Alliance	MVA	NDA	Left Democratic Front
Leader's seat	Direct Sarpanch	Direct Sarpanch	Direct Sarpanch
Last election	6	7	3
Percentage	%
Alliance	NDA
Sarpanch before election
Ms Madurai Moreshwar Bade
PWPI
Elected Sarpanch
Mr. Pramod Kondilkar
PWPI

Executive branch (20 December 2022 - Incumbent)

Political party	Seats
Government	Gram Vikas Aghadi
Peasants and Workers Party of India	05 + 01 (Sarpanch) =06
Shiv Sena (Uddhav Balasaheb Thackeray) (B)	02
Indian National Congress (B)	02
total	09
Opposition	Maha Vikas Aghadi
Nationalist Congress Party	01
Indian National Congress (A)	02
Shiv Sena (Uddhav Balasaheb Thackeray) (A)	00
total	03
Others (A)	Single Party
Balasahebanchi Shiv Sena	02
total	02
Others (B)	Single Party
Bharatiya Janata Party	00
total	00
Independent politician	Single Group
Independent	00
total	00
Grand total	14

- Sarpanch

Mr. Pramod Tukaram Kondilkar (SKP) = Gram Vikas Aghadi

- Deputy Sarpanch And Member 3 - 2

Mr. Santosh Vasant Modak (SKP)
(Leader of the House) (2022 - 2025)

- 1 - 1 Member

Mr. Prasad Eknath Bade (BSS)

- 1 - 2 Member

Mrs. Ranjana Nilesh Wagh (INC) B

- 2 - 1 Member

Mr. Omprakash Shivram Bade (BSS)

- 2 - 2 Member

Mrs. Nirmala Ganesh Nirguda (SKP)

- 2 - 3 Member

Mrs. Reshma Ramesh Bade (SHS(UBT)) B

- 3 - 1 Member

Mr. Parkash Kaluram Nirguda (INC) B
(Deputy Sarpanch) (2022 - 2025) and
(Leader of the House) (2025 - Incumbent)

- 3 - 3 Member

Mrs. Taibai Palu Pardhi (SKP)

- 4 - 1 Member

Mr. Ambo Kashinath Pardhi (INC) A

- 4 - 2 Member

Mrs. Sugandha Shankar Mali (SHS(UBT)) B

- 4 - 3 Member

Mrs. Kanija Nisar Logde (INC) A

- 5 - 1 Member
  (Leader of the Opposition)

Mr. Shahid Sikandar Maste (NCP)

- 5 - 2 Member

Mrs. Revta Lahu Dhole (SKP)(Ending April 2023)

Mrs. Karisma Sunil Dhole (SKP) (Starting 6 November 2023)

=== By Election Member Gram Panchayat Kalamb 2023 (पोट निवडनुक सदस्य ग्राम पंचायत कळंब २०२३) ===
First Candidate	Second Candidate
Ward No. 05/02	Ward No. 05/02
Name; Mrs. Karisma Sunil Dhole	Name; Mrs. Sarita Subhash Wagh
Political Party; Peasants and Workers Party of India	Political Party; Nationalist Congress Party (Ajit Pawar Group)
Alliance; Gram Vikas Aghadi	Alliance; Maha Yoti
Date of Poll; 5 November 2023	Date of Poll; 5 November 2023
Popular vote NA	Popular vote NA
Percentage; 71.50%	Percentage; 29.50%
Seats; Won	Seats; Lost
Date of Counting of Votes; 06November 2023	Date of Counting of Votes; 06November 2023

== Languages ==
Marathi Aagri Urdu Hindi kokni Aadivasi

== Education Facilities ==
- Raigad Zilla Parishad Urdu School kalamb
- Raigad Zilla Parishad Marathi School Kalamb
- Koaeso Pragati Madaymick Vidyalay kalamb
- Ashramshala Kalamb

== Geography ==
Kalamb is located in the taluka of Karjat in Raigad district in the state of Maharashtra. It is 21 km north-east from the main Town Karjat, 12 km from Neral, 79.7 km from its District Main City Raigad and 82 km from its state capital Mumbai. It falls on the road connecting Karjat and Murbad.

The village occupies 764 hectares.

== Hospitals in Kalamb ==
- Primary Health Center Kalamb

Kalamb Karjat - Murbad Rd; Maharashtra 410101, India

== Hindu Temples in Kalamb ==
- Kalamb Dahivalikar Maharaj Math

Kalamb Maharashtra 410101 India

- Jay Tadoba Temple

Kalamb Maharashtra 410101 India

- Hanuman Mandir

Kalamb Maharashtra 410101 India

== Islamic Temples in Kalamb ==
- Hazrat Amin Shah Baba Dargah

At Pos. Kalamb Tat. karjat Dist. Raigad Maharashtra 410101 India

- Hazrat Sheikh Ali Shah Baba Dargah

At Pos. Kalamb Tal. karjat Dist. Raigad Maharashtra 410101 India

- Hazrat Kutub Shamsuddin Rahmatullahlaih Shah Baba Dargah

At Pos. Kalamb Tal. karjat Dist. Raigad Maharashtra 410101 India

- Sanni Jama Masjid Kalamb

At Pos. Kalamb Tal . karjat Dist. Raigad Maharashtra 410101 India
