= Kashele =

Village in Maharashtra, India

- village
- Location in Maharashtra, India Kashele (India)
- Coordinates: 19.010271°N 73.420297°E
- Country: India
- State: Maharashtra
- District: Raigad
- Talukas: Karjat

Area
  - Total: 7.6 km^{2} (2.9 sq mi)
- Elevation: 57 m (187 ft)

Population (2011)
  - Total: 2,875
  - Density: 380/km^{2} (980/sq mi)

Languages
  - Official: Marathi, Hindi
- Time zone: UTC+5:30 (IST)
- Postal code: 410201

Kashele is a village near the city of Karjat, in the state of Maharashtra, India. The village is located 82 km from Mumbai, and its official language is Marathi. As of the 2011 census, Kashele had a population of 2875, in 576 households.

== Demographics ==
The population of Kashele was 2875 at the 2011 census, of which 1418 were female, 1475 were male, and 383 were under 6 years of age. The number of people described as literate in the census was 1983.
The village is serviced by both Hindu and Buddhist temples and a rural hospital.

== Education Facilities ==
There are 5 schools in Kashele.

== Geography ==
Kashele is located in the taluka of Karjat in Raigad district in the state of Maharashtra. It is 21 km north-east from the main Town Karjat, 10 km from Neral, 79.7 km from its District Main City Raigad and 82 km from its state capital Mumbai. It falls on the road connecting Karjat and Murbad.

The village occupies 761 hectares.
