= Raigad district =

Coordinates: 18°39′00″N 72°52′48″E

- District of Maharashtra
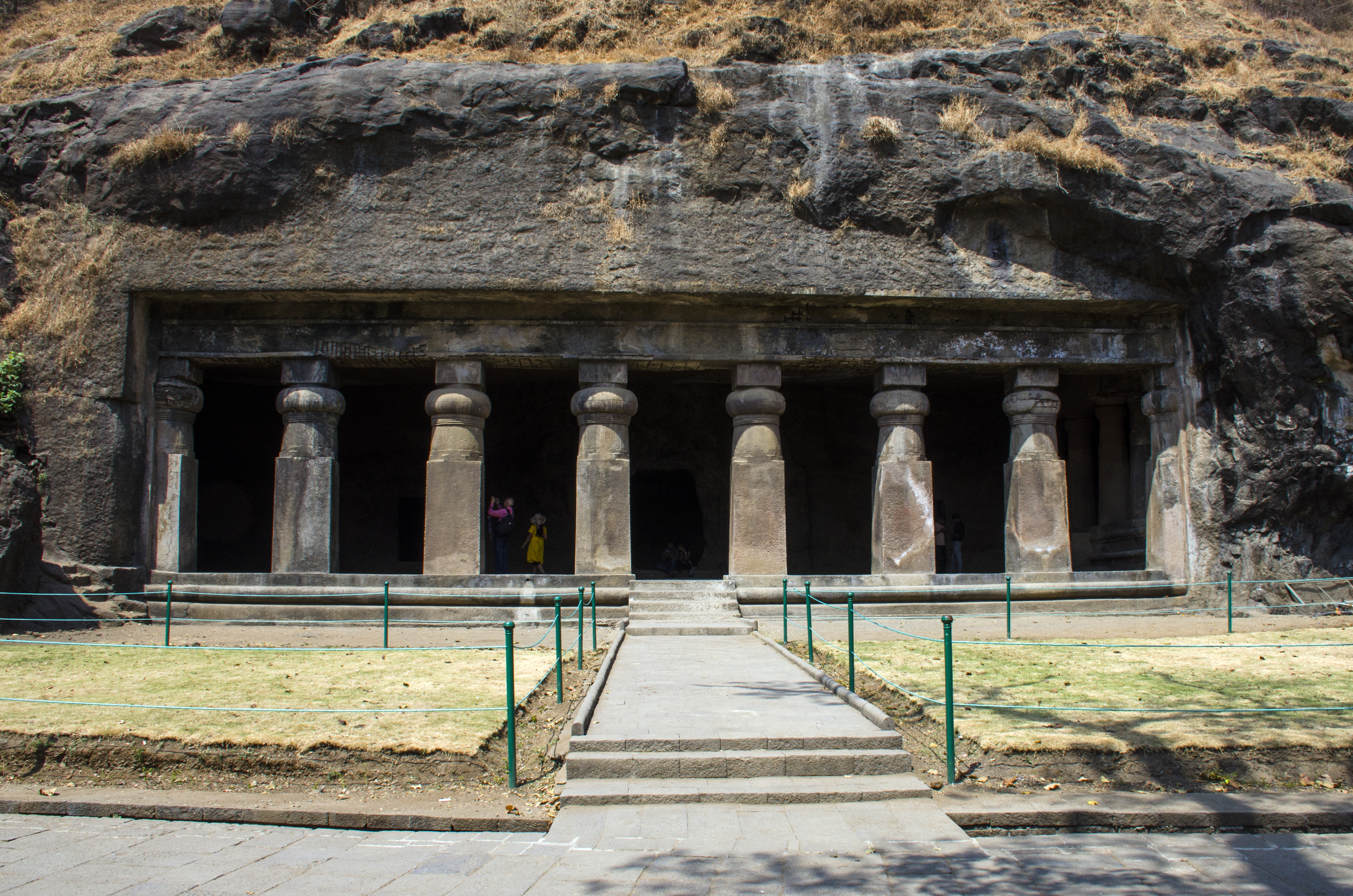
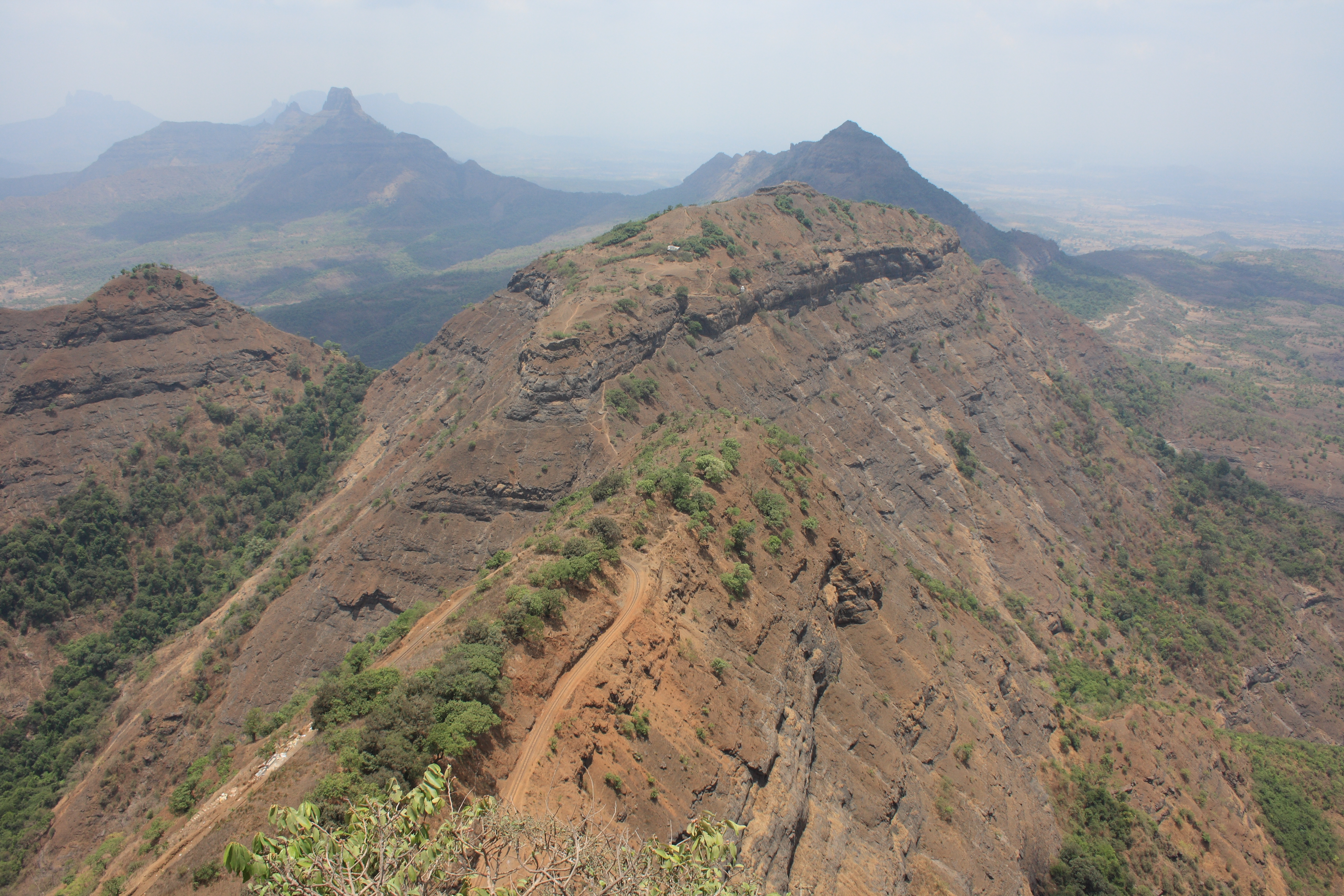
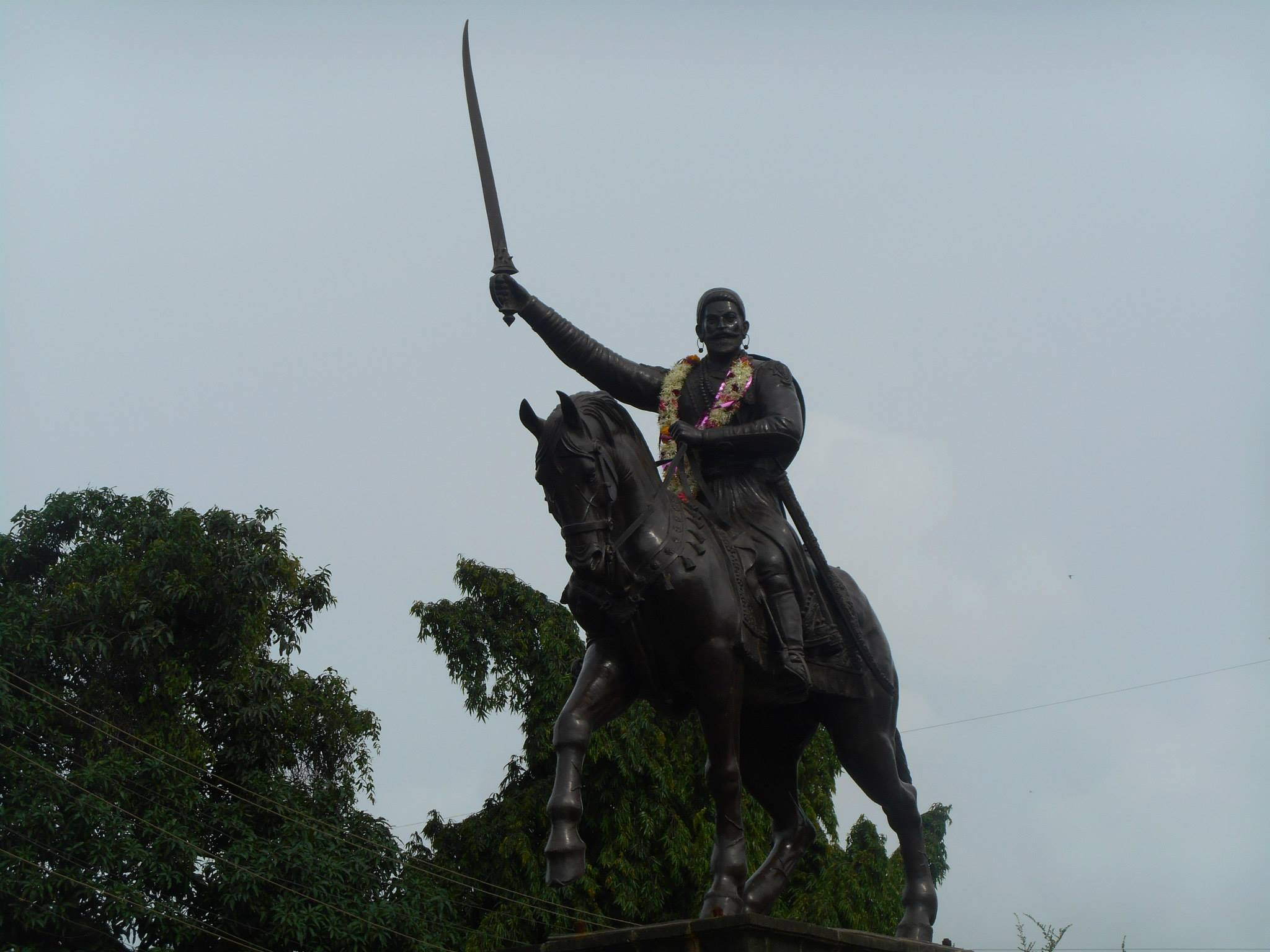
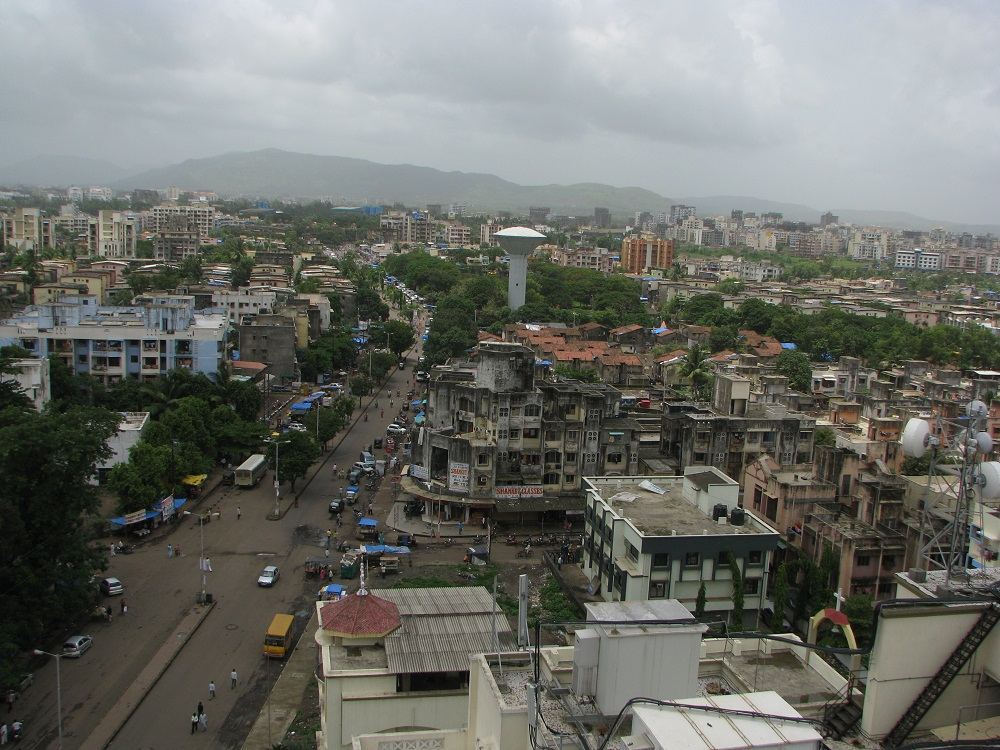
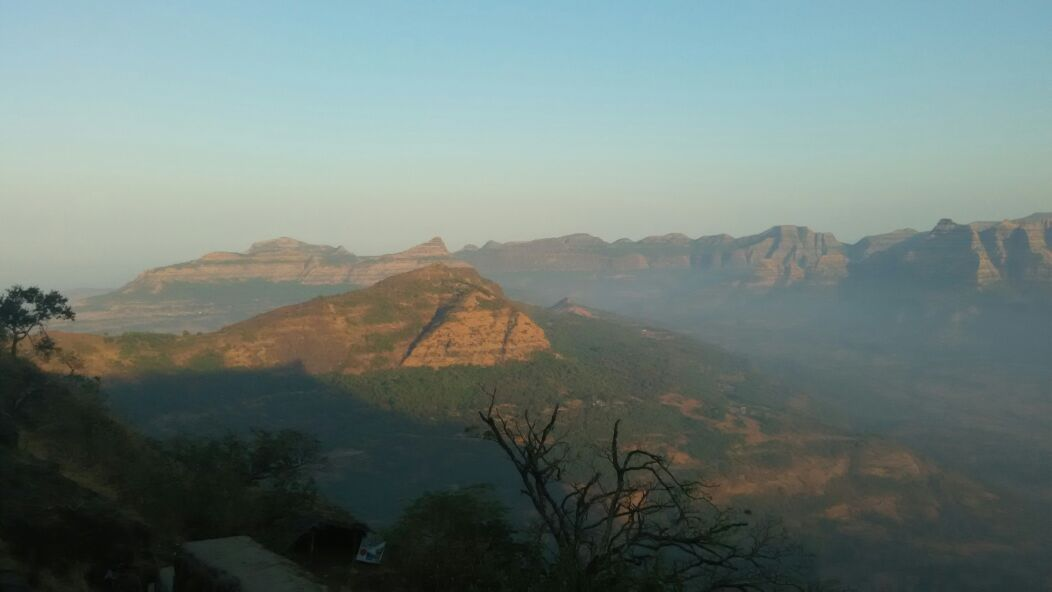
- Clockwise from top-left: Elephanta Caves, Hills near Matheran, Kalamboli, Hills around Raigad Fort, Shivaji statue in Alibag

- Location in Maharashtra
- Country: India
- State: Maharashtra
- Division: Konkan
- Headquarters: Alibag
- Subdistricts: 1. Alibag, 2. Panvel, 3. Murud, 4. Pen, 5. Uran, 6. Karjat, 7. Khalapur, 8. Mangaon, 9. Roha, 10. Sudhagad, 11.Tala, 12. Mahad, 13. Mhasala, 14. Shrivardhan, 15. Poladpur

Government
  - Body: Raigad Zilla Parishad Alibag
  - Guardian Minister: Bharatshet Gogawale (Cabinet Minister)
  - Raigad Zilla Parishad: President Shri. Mangesh Wakadikar Vice President Shri. Madhukar Patil
  - District Collector: Mr. Kishan Narayanrao Jawale (IAS)
  - CEO Z. P. Raigad: Dr. Bharat Bastewad (IAS)
  - MPs: Sunil Tatkare (Raigad); Shrirang Barne (Maval)

Area
  - Total: 7,152 km^{2} (2,761 sq mi)

Population (2011)
  - Total: 2,634,200
  - Density: 368.3/km^{2} (953.9/sq mi)
  - Urban: 36.91%

Demographics
  - Literacy: 83.14
  - Sex ratio: 959 per 1000 male

GDP (Nominal, 2025)
  - Total: ₹1.21 trillion (US$12.5 billion)
  - Per capita: ₹357,581 (US$3,702.16)
- Time zone: UTC+05:30 (IST)
- Major highways: NH-4, NH-66
- Average annual precipitation: 3,884 mm
- Website: raigad.gov.in/en/

Raigad district (Marathi pronunciation: [ɾaːjɡəɖ]), previously Colaba district, is a district in the Konkan division of Maharashtra, India. The headquarters of the district is Alibag. Raigad district is located in the western part of Maharashtra. Other major cities in the district are Panvel, Karjat, Navi Mumbai, Khopoli, Shrivardhan and Mahad.

== Guardian Minister ==
Guardian Minister
- पालकमंत्री
- Emblem of India
- Style: The Honourable
- Appointer: Chief Minister of Maharashtra
- Term length: 5 years / No time limit
- Website: http://http:

The district was renamed to Raigad after the fort that was the first capital of the former Maratha Empire, which in turn was renamed from its earlier name, Rairi. The fort is located in the interior regions of the district, in dense forests, on a west-facing spur of the Western Ghats of Sahyadri Range. In 2011 the district had a population of 2,634,200, compared to 2,207,929 in 2001. The name was changed in the regime of Chief Minister A. R. Antulay on 1 January 1981. In 2011 urban dwellers had increased to 36.91% from 24.22% in 2001. Alibag is the headquarters of Raigad district.

Raigad district's neighbouring districts are Mumbai, Thane districts on North, Pune district on East, Satara district on South East, Ratnagiri district is present on South side and Arabian sea on West.

== History ==
Kulaba (also spelled Kolaba) district was split from Thane district in 1869. At this point, the northernmost parts of present-day Raigad district were retained in Thane district. Panvel, just across the bay from Mumbai, was not included in Kolaba district until 1883, and Karjat, an area in the north-east corner of modern Raigad district, was not placed in Kolaba district until 1891. Kolaba district was later renamed as Raigad district.

In July 2023, a major landslide, caused by torrential rains, resulted in at least 22 deaths, with more than 100 feared trapped under debris. Over half of the houses in the hillside village, precisely 17 out of 48, were either entirely or partially buried by the debris from the landslide.

== Geography ==
The district is bounded by Mumbai Harbour to the northwest, Thane district to the north, Pune district to the east, Ratnagiri district to the south and the Arabian Sea to the west. It includes the large natural harbour of Pen-Mandwa, which is immediately south of Mumbai harbour, and forming a single landform with it.

The northern part of the district is included in the planned metropolis of Navi Mumbai, consisting of Kharghar, Ulve node, New Panvel and Khanda Colony, Taloja, Kamothe and Kalamboli nodes as well as Uran City and its port, the JNPT.

The district includes cities/towns Kharghar, Taloja, Kalamboli, Panvel, Rasayani, Karjat, Khopoli, Matheran, Uran, Pen, Alibag, Murud-Janjira, Roha, Nagothane, Sudhagad-Pali, Mangaon, Mhasla, Shrivardhan, Mahad, Birwadi, Poladpur. The largest city in terms of Population, Industrialization as well as Area is Panvel. The district also includes the isle of Gharapuri or Elephanta, located in Uran which has ancient Hindu and Buddhist caves.

== Administrative subdivisions ==
Raigad district is divided into eight subdivisions, with fifteen talukas, and 1,967 villages.

- Sub-Divisions: 8
- Talukas: 15
- Towns: 23
- Municipal Corporation(s): 1
- Municipal Councils: 10
- Nagar Panchayats: 6

Subdivision	Taluka	km^{2}	Census 2001	Census 2011	Panchayats	Villages
Alibag	Alibag	500	221,661	236,167	62	218
Alibag	Murud	231	72,046	74,207	24	74
Pen	Pen	499	176,681	195,454	63	171
Panvel	Panvel	631	422,522	750,236	90	177
Panvel	Uran	184	140,351	160,303	34	62
Karjat	Karjat	665	184,420	212,051	50	184
Karjat	Khalapur	183	183,604	207,464	42	141
Roha	Roha	643	161,750	167,110	62	162
Roha	Sudhagad	467	62,852	62,380	34	98
Mangaon	Mangaon	683	152,270	159,613	74	187
Mangaon	Tala	250	42,869	40,619	26	61
Shrivardhan	Shrivardhan	120	85,071	83,027	43	78
Shrivardhan	Mhasla	236	61,010	59,914	40	84
Mahad	Mahad	1,257	186,521	180,191	134	183
Mahad	Poladpur	373	54,301	45,464	43	87
Total	15	7,152	2,207,929	2,634,200	821	1,967

== Municipal Civic Bodies ==
Panvel (in Navi Mumbai city) is the main Municipal Corporations responsible for services. MMRDA, CIDCO, and NAINA are the special planning authorities operational in Raigad district.

=== Municipal Corporations ===
- Panvel

=== Municipal Councils ===
- Alibag
- Uran
- Matheran
- Karjat
- Khopoli
- Pen
- Roha-Ashtami
- Murud-Janjira
- Mahad
- Shrivardhan

=== Nagar Panchayats ===
- Mangaon
- Poladpur
- Tala
- Mhasla
- Khalapur
- Pali-Sudhagad

=== Proposed Municipal Council(s) ===
- Mangaon
- Rasayani
- Neral-Mamdapur

=== Proposed Nagar Panchayats ===
- Nagothane
- Jite-Kharpada
- Bhivpuri Road
- Shelu
- Kalamb Karjat
- Kashele
- Karnala
- Kasu

== Demographics ==
Historical population
Year	Pop.	±% p.a.
1901	721,083	—
1911	714,371	−0.09%
1921	677,586	−0.53%
1931	756,315	+1.11%
1941	805,157	+0.63%
1951	909,083	+1.22%
1961	1,058,855	+1.54%
1971	1,263,003	+1.78%
1981	1,486,452	+1.64%
1991	1,824,816	+2.07%
2001	2,207,929	+1.92%
2011	2,634,200	+1.78%

Religions in Raigad district (2011)
Religion	Percent
Hinduism	85.01%
Islam	8.64%
Buddhism	4.62%
Christianity	0.66%
Jainism	0.47%
Other or not stated	0.60%

According to the 2011 census Raigad district has a population of 2,634,200, roughly equal to the nation of Kuwait or the US state of Nevada. This gives it a ranking of 153rd in India (out of a total of 640). The district has a population density of 368 inhabitants per square kilometre (950/sq mi). Its population growth rate over the decade 2001-2011 was 19.31%. Raigad has a sex ratio of 959 females for every 1000 males, and a literacy rate of 83.14%. 36.83% of the population lived in urban areas. Scheduled Castes and Scheduled Tribes make up 5.12% and 11.58% of the population respectively.

Languages in Raigad district (2011)
1. Marathi (79.0%)
2. Hindi (7.06%)
3. Urdu (5.86%)
4. 'Other' Marathi (1.01%)
5. Gujarati (0.90%)
6. Others (6.13%)

At the time of the 2011 Census of India, 79.04% of the population in the district spoke Marathi, 7.06% Hindi, 5.85% Urdu and 0.90% Gujarati as their first language. 1.01% of the population recorded their language as 'Others' under Marathi.

The most populous tribes are the Katkari, Thakar and Mahadev Koli.

== Transport ==
Raigad District is connected to Mumbai by Sion Panvel Expressway. The Mumbai-Pune expressway and NH4 passes through Panvel. NH 66, which starts at Panvel, traverses the whole district. The Konkan Railway line starts at Roha and passes through Mangaon and Veer in Mahad. The Central Railway Line of Mumbai to Pune passes through Karjat with Extension Line for Karjat to Khopoli. Panvel Junction is the most important railway station in the district; it is connected to Mumbai (by both the Harbour Line and Main Line of Central Railway), Thane (by Trans-Harbour Line), Roha, Vasai (Western Railway) and Karjat. All trains, ranging from passengers to Rajdhanis stop here, and it is considered the gateway for travelling south. There is a narrow gauge railroad from Neral to Matheran, called the Matheran Hill Railway. The main ports are JNPT, Mandava, Revas, Murud, Dighi and Shrivardhan.

== Education ==
After the British took over the old Colaba and this region, they established four Anglo-Vernacular medium school and 30 government schools in the year 1865–66. In the year 1861 the first school for girls was started in Alibag. The Mission Church started the first English school in Alibag in 1879. Prabhakar Patil Education Society (PNP education Society) runs 27 Institutes: Five Primary English & Marathi Schools, Twenty Seven Secondary Marathi Schools, One Arts, Science & Commerce Jr. & Sr. College, One English & Marathi Medium D.Ed. College, One B.Ed. College, One Polytechnic Institute and One MMS College. Securities and Exchange Board of India (SEBI) established National Institute of Securities Markets at Patalganga, tal Khalapur. Two more old and valuable institutions in Raigad District named Vasantrao Naik College Murud And Mhasla, established by the former Chief Minister of Maharashtra A. R. Antulay.

The Dr. Babasaheb Ambedkar Technological University is a unitary, autonomous university located at Lonere in Raigad district, established in 1989 under the Government of Maharashtra Act 1983.
