= Konkan division =

Region in Maharashtra, India

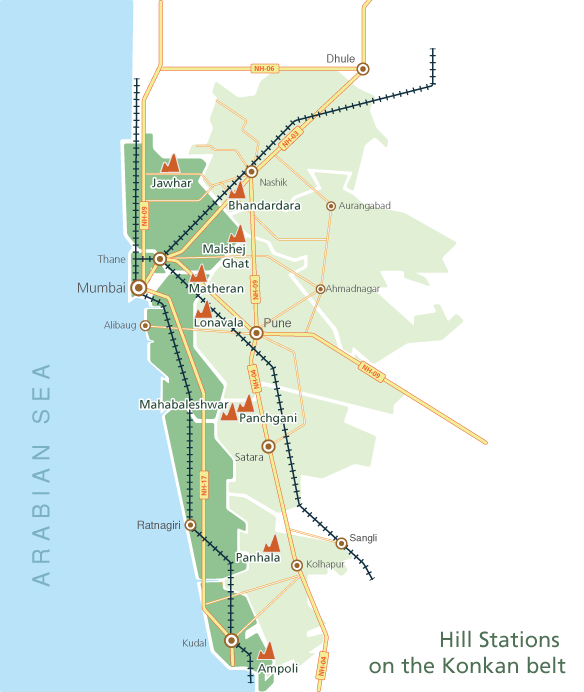
- A schematic map of Konkan division in Maharashtra, showing hill stations and the roadways and railways connecting them

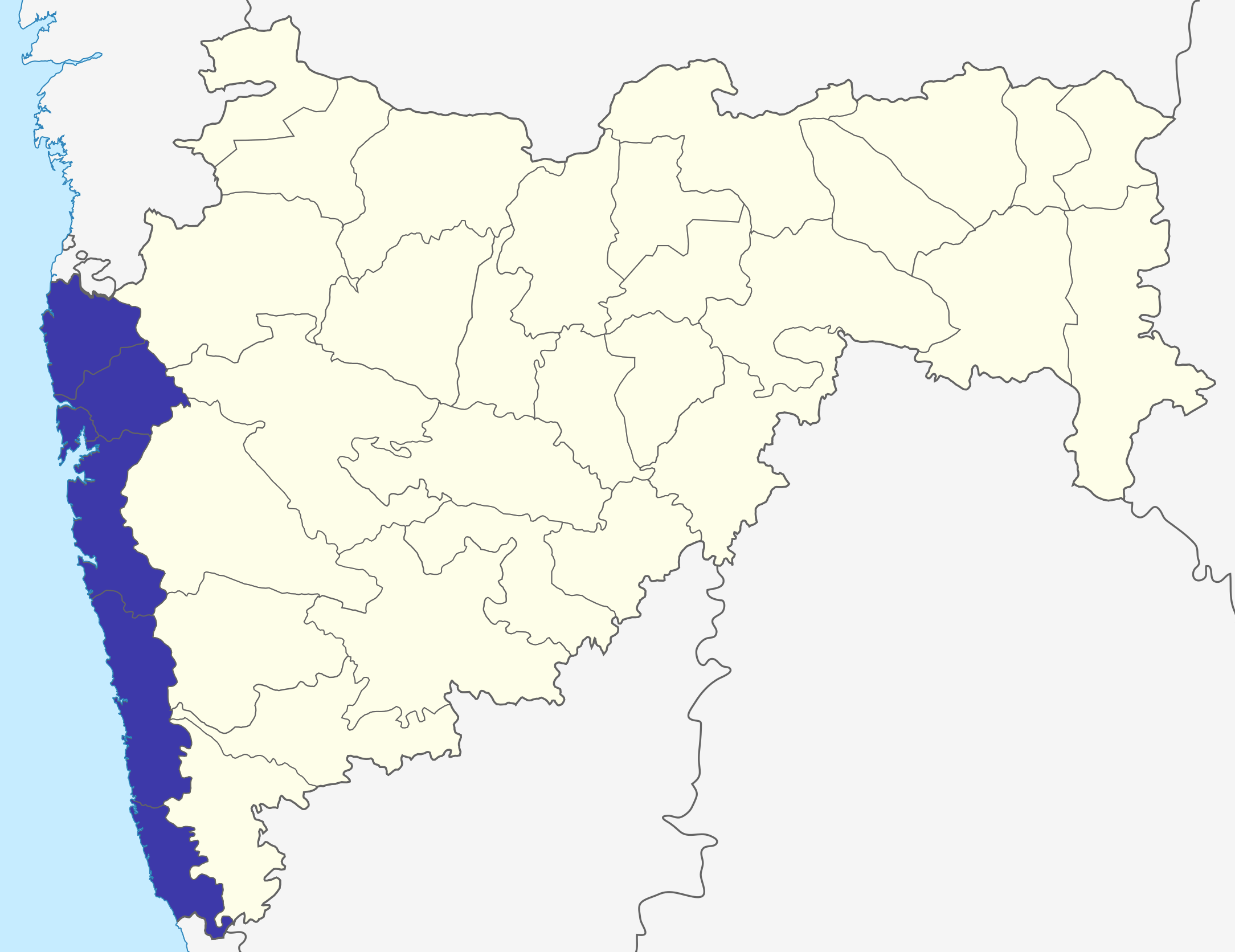
- Location of Konkan division in Maharashtra
- Coordinates: 18°57′53″N 72°49′33″E
- Country: India
- State: Maharashtra
- Districts: Mumbai Suburban district; Mumbai City district; Palghar district; Raigad district; Ratnagiri district; Sindhudurg district; Thane district

Government
  - Commissioner Konkan Division: Mr. Dr. Mahendra Kalyankar (IAS) Additional charge
  - Police Commissioner Konkan Division: NA
  - All Guardian Minister Konkan Division: Aaditya Thackeray; (Mumbai Suburban District): Aslam Shaikh; (Mumbai City District): Aditi Sunil Tatkare; (Raigad District): Subhash Desai Additional charge; (Thane District): Aditi Sunil Tatkare Additional charge; (Palghar District): Anil Parab; (Ratnagiri District): Anil Parab Additional charge; (Sindhudurg District)
  - All District Collectors Konkan Division: Nidhi Chaudhary (IAS); (Mumbai Suburban District): Mr. Rajeev D. Nivatkar (IAS); (Mumbai City District): Mr. Dr. Mahendra Kalyankar (IAS); (Raigad District): Mr. Rajesh J. Narvekar (IAS); (Thane District): Mr. Dr. Manik Gursul (IAS); (Palghar District): Mr. Dr. B. N. Patil (IAS); (Ratnagiri District): Ms. K. Manjulekshmi (IAS); (Sindhudurg District)
  - All MPs Konkan Division: -

Area
  - Total: 30,728 km^{2} (11,864 sq mi)

Population (2011)
  - Total: 28,601,441

GDP (Nominal, 2025)
  - Total: ₹17.92 trillion (US$241.85 billion)
  - Per capita: ₹457,361 (US$6,172.25)

Konkan division is one of the six administrative divisions of Maharashtra state in India. It comprises the central portions of the Konkani region, excluding Goa and Daman, which were absorbed into Maharashtra owing to the States Reorganisation of India. Konkan division is the western section of present-day Maharashtra, alongside the west coast of India. The two districts of the state capital of Mumbai (Bombay) also fall into this division.

== Demographics ==
As per the 2011 Census of India, Konkan division had a population of 28,601,441

=== Languages ===
The most spoken language is Marathi, which is also the sole official language of the region. Due to the presence of large number of migrants in the Mumbai Metropolitan Region and other parts of Konkan; Hindi, Urdu and regional languages are also spoken by a significant portion of the population as their first language.

=== Religion ===
At the time of the 2011 Census of India, 74.31% of the population of Konkan division followed Hinduism, 15.26% Islam, 4.59% Buddhism, 2.52% Christianity and the remaining 3.32% of the population followed other religions or stated no religion.

Religion in Konkan division (2011)
1. Hinduism (74.3%)
2. Islam (15.3%)
3. Buddhism (4.59%)
4. Christianity (2.52%)
5. Other or not stated (3.32%)

== History of administrative districts in Konkan division ==
There have been changes in the names of districts. Newer districts were also added after India gained independence in 1947 and also after the state of Maharashtra was formed.

- Since 1947, the east–west tracts of Thane district on Salsette Island, starting with the city of Bandra, then Andheri, then finally Borivali to Dahisar were carved out and added to the former Bombay, now 'Mumbai,' district. Recently, the Mumbai district was bifurcated into the Mumbai and Mumbai Suburban districts; the latter covers Salsette Island.
- In 1961, the Konkan region became a part of the newly formed state of Maharashtra. Prior to this it was a part of Bombay Presidency which was split to form Gujarat and Maharashtra.
- Creation of the Sindhudurg from the southern areas of the Ratnagiri district.
- The erstwhile Kolaba district was renamed as Raigad.
- In 2014, Palghar district was carved out of Thane district with the inclusion of the northern parts of Thane district, which included Palghar, Vada, Vikramgad, Jawhar, Mokhada, Dahanu, and Talasari Vasai talukas in the new district.

== See also ==
- Coastal India
  - Sapta Konkan
    - Aparanta
