= Islam in Maharashtra =

Muslims in Maharashtra
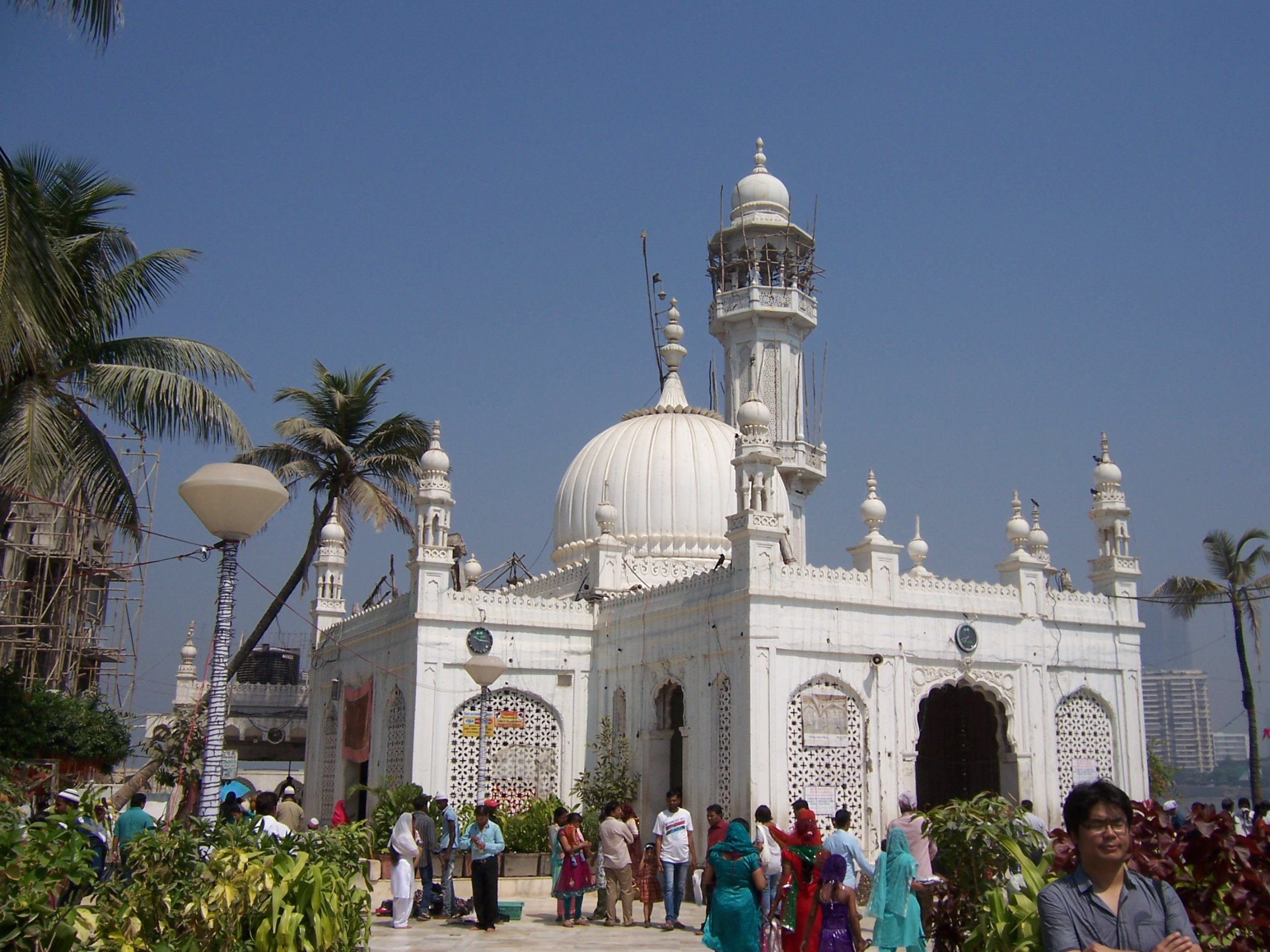
- The shrine of Haji Ali Shah Bukhari, Mumbai

Total population
- 12,971,152 (2011 census) (11.5% of the state population)

Regions with significant populations
- Significant minority in Marathwada and Mumbai region

Languages
- Urdu • Marathi • Konkani • Hindi

Islam is the second largest religion in Maharashtra, India, comprising 12,971,152 people which is 11.54% of the population. Muslims are largely concentrated in urban areas of the state, especially in Mumbai and the Marathwada region. There are several groups of Muslims in Maharashtra: Marathi and Konkani Muslims, whose native language is various dialects of Marathi and Konkani, Dakhni Muslims, whose native language is Dakhni Urdu, and more recent Urdu-speaking migrants from North India.

== History ==
=== Early history ===
The Konkan Coast, like other regions along the western coast of India, long had trade relations with the Arab world. The first presence of Islam in what is today Maharashtra comes from Arab traders arriving on the Konkan coast in the 7th and 8th centuries. These Arab traders often married local women and settled down to form their own communities. This community of Konkani Muslims maintained many ties with Arabs and became known as prominent traders.

In the rest of Maharashtra, the first time Islam was brought there was when Alauddin Khilji raided Devagiri, capital of the Yadava dynasty, in 1296. Ramachandra reluctantly agreed to pay tribute to the Delhi Sultanate and become his tributary. In 1308, Malik Kafur, under Alauddin Khilji, conquered Devagiri and renamed it to Daulatabad. This was the beginning of Islamic rule over western Maharashtra. During this time, many Sufi saints came to the region and spread Islam among common people, although the vast majority remained non-Muslim. During the 14th century, Muhammad bin Tughlaq attempted to shift his capital to Daulatabad, but soon gave up and moved back to Delhi. However many of the North Indian migrants who came during the move stayed under the Sultanate governors. Originally concentrated in the region around Daulatabad, these migrants and their descendants slowly spread throughout the Deccan, bringing their Hindustani dialect and culture. These formed the basis of the Dakhni Muslims, which grew both by further migration and adoption of Islam by many local non-Muslims.

Islamic ideals were percolated through the population by vernacular literature such as charkha-nama (literally spinning-wheel songs), songs written in Dakhni which would have been sung by women spinning thread. These songs contained Islamic ideals and values and greatly influenced popular religious practice. After the death of a Sufi, their power as mystical beings often resulted in large followings amongst both Muslims and non-Muslims both while they were alive and often even more so after their death. This veneration of pirs resulted in some non-Muslim communities adopting more Islamic ideals that they started self-identifying as Muslims, such as a large body from the Hindu Sali and Koshta weaving communities.

In 1347, during the rebellion of Ismail Mukh, Alauddin Bahman Shah declared his independence from the Delhi Sultanate, forming the Bahmani Sultanate. These sultans, who were ruling over a population that was overwhelmingly non-Muslim, did not follow the advice of their Maulvis to impose strict Shariah in their territories for all citizens. Although the Delhi Sultans did destroy temples, as did the early Bahamani sultans, they never faced much opposition from the still-powerful Hindu nobility. In the last two decades of Bahamani rule, the kingdom split into five different sultanates: Ahmednagar, Berar, Bijapur, Bidar and Golconda. These Deccan Sultanates were a magnet for migrants from various Muslim regions, mainly Persia and Arabia. These migrants obtained high positions in the courts of the sultanates. However in the Bahmani Sultanate, a rift erupted between mulkis (local Deccanis) and non-mulkis (migrants from other parts of the Muslim world), which became court factions. The rivalry between these two factions helped to destabilize the Bahmani Sultanate in its later years and led to its breakup.

The northern Konkan coast was ruled by the Gujarat Sultanate. This region, especially the islands that would make up Mumbai, were constantly being fought over by the Gujarat and Bahamani sultans until the Portuguese arrival. The sultans constructed numerous mosques and dargahs on the various islands, the most famous being the Haji Ali Dargah. In 1535, the Gujarat sultanate signed a treaty ceding all of the northern Konkan coast to the Portuguese, ending Islamic rule in the region.

The Khandesh region of North Maharashtra was formerly ruled by the Hindu Chauhans of Asirgarh (now Burhanpur), who were overthrown by Alauddin Khilji. The region was then annexed to the Delhi Sultanate, but like the rest of the Deccan, eventually broke away from Delhi to form the Bahmani Sultanate. However the Farooquis, a family claiming Sayyid origin, soon declared their independence from the Bahmanis to form the Khandesh Sultanate. This sultanate had a Muslim aristocracy but was largely populated by tribal Bhils and Kolis. The Sultanate ruled for 100 years as a tributary of Gujarat and Bahmanis before being conquered by Akbar in the late 16th century.

South of Mumbai was the state of Janjira, founded by a Sheedi Muslim commander who defeated the local ruler, Ramrao Patil, and put himself under the overlordship of the Bijapur Sultans. When the Portuguese arrived and the Ottomans resisted their entry to the Indian Ocean, Janjira played an important role as an Ottoman ally.

The Sultanates continued Muslim rule, although they relied heavily on Hindu jagirdars, especially Marathas, for collection of taxes and maintaining their armies. During this time, a composite Hindu-Muslim syncretism developed, sometimes sponsored by the sultans themselves. Sheikh Muhammad, a notable Sufi from Ahmednagar, also became a venerated Bhakti saint. Ibrahim Adlil Shah II was also called 'Jagadguru', and patronized both Hindu and Muslim religious and literary figures.

However gradually the Deccan Sultanates consolidated. Berar was conquered by Ahmednagar, and Bidar by Bijapur. In 1591, Emperor Akbar asked all the Deccan sultans to acknowledge his rule. When none did, Akbar attacked Ahmednagar, which was defended by Chand Bibi. Chand Bibi repulsed Akbar's invasion, but from then on the Ahmednagar sultans had to contend with Mughal power. Under the regency of Malik Ambar, a Habshi slave-turned ruler, Ahmednagar successfully led a guerrilla campaign to defeat the Mughal invaders. The grandfather and father of Shivaji, Maloji and Shahaji, served Ambar during his campaigns, and later became a feudatory of the Bijapur sultanate. After Malik Ambar's death, the new Mughal governor, Aurangzeb, waged constant wars against the Deccan Sultans, and annexed Ahmednagar in 1636 after defeating Shahaji. Aurangzeb began to encroach on Bijapur's territory.

Starting in the 1650s, Shahaji's son, Shivaji, began to carve a territory for himself out of the jagir his father held around Pune. He soon came into conflict with the Bijapur Sultans, and defeated their commander Afzal Khan. Although he was Hindu, Shivaji had no compunctions in allying himself with Muslim powers. He once offered his aid to Aurangzeb in his conquest of Bijapur. He also employed Muslims in his army, and one of his naval commanders, Daulat Khan, was a Muslim. In 1657, his conflict with the Mughals began, and continued until the end of his life.

The Marathas continued to struggle against Mughal rule in western Maharashtra throughout Aurangzeb's reign. However in the rest of Maharashtra, Mughal rule continued. Maharashtra was under six Mughal subahs: Khandesh, Bijapur, Berar, Aurangabad, Hyderabad and Bidar. After Aurangzeb's death, these territories passed to Nizam-ul-Mulk, who later broke away forming Hyderabad state in 1724 after losing favour at the Imperial court. He still claimed to be a vassal. However Nizam-ul-Mulk soon had to contend with the Marathas, who after Aurangzeb's death, began to expand into north India and the rest of the Deccan. Nizam-ul-Mulk at first defeated the Marathas and even captured Pune in 1727, but was defeated in the Battle of Palkhed in 1728 and signed a treaty allowing the Marathas to collect Chauth payments from the entire Deccan. The Marathas exercised suzerainty over the Konkan and the entirety of western Maharashtra, while the Nizams continued to control Marathwada.

Far-eastern Maharashtra, present-day Nagpur division, was ruled by the Gonds of Deogarh. In 1666 Gond ruler Bhagtu came to Aurangzeb's court and became Muslim, taking the name Bakht Buland Shah. He invited cultivators and artisans, both Hindu and Muslim, to settle in the plains areas of his kingdom for its development. He founded the city of Nagpur. After the death of his son, Chand Sultan, squabbles among Chand Sultan's heirs led to a Maratha intervention. The Marathas became the rulers of Nagpur state and the Gond rulers became jagirdars. Afterwards the Marathas wrested control of Berar from the Nizams, but in 1803 the British, after the first Anglo-Maratha war, returned Berar to the Nizams. However the Nizams soon ceded Berar to the British.

=== Modern history ===
After the Third Anglo-Maratha War in 1818, the British took over their domains. Western Maharashtra became part of the Bombay Presidency, headquartered in Bombay. During the 19th century, Muslims migrated to Mumbai in large numbers: some wealthy Bohra traders, while many Julaha weavers moved to Mumbai to work in the textile mills there. These mill workers were joined by many Marathas who moved to Mumbai for the same purpose. Similarly was the settlement of Malegaon in Nashik district. Some upper class Muslims, such as Badruddin Tyabji, were westernized. Tyabji became a lawyer and established many educational institutions. In 1893, communal tensions over cow slaughter turned into a full-scale riot in Mumbai. After this many syncretic traditions, such as the participation of Hindus in Muharram festivities, became much less common, partly due to the influence of nationalists like Bal Gangadhar Tilak, who organized the first public Ganesh Chaturthi celebrations partly to provide an alternative to Muharram.

Marathwada was particularly under the influence of the Khilafat Movement in 1924 due to its large Muslim population. Later in 1948, the Razarkar movement under Qasim Rizvi was strong in the same region. The Razarkars forced many Hindus and other pro-Indian people out of Hyderabad, and after the Indian army liberated Hyderabad, there was significant anti-Muslim violence in Marathwada as elsewhere in Hyderabad.

In the 1980s Muslims, especially in Mumbai, faced attacks from organizations such as Shiv Sena. In 1993, after the demolition of the Babri Masjid, large-scale rioting broke out between Hindus and Muslims in Mumbai. In retaliation, Dawood Ibrahim, a noted underworld don and Mumbai native, orchestrated the 1993 Bombay Bombings.

== Economic situation ==
Muslims in Maharashtra are mainly an urban community. Economically they are much poorer than the general population, and 38% of Muslims described themselves as 'workers'. 70% of Muslim workers are employed in semi-skilled or skilled manual labour, with fewer engaged in agricultural cultivation or labour. Although for Muslim women workers in rural areas agricultural labour is the dominant occupation. Much like the general population, Muslims are facing major unemployment especially for the youth and those living in urban areas. Muslims have a higher proportion of landless or those with small landholdings compared to the general population, and in urban areas mostly live in ghettoes without basic amenities. Higher fractions of Muslims live in slums compared to the general population. Average loan amounts given by banks is lower for Muslims compared to Buddhist or Sikh minorities. Muslims also have more political and administrative under-representation compared to the general population.

== Demographics ==
According to 2011 Census, Muslims have a population of 12,971,152 in Maharashtra and make up 11.54% of the population, making Islam the second most practiced religion after Hinduism. This is an increase from the 2001 census, when they made up 10.60% of the population. The vast majority of Muslims in Maharashtra live in urban areas: 73%, compared to 45% for Maharashtra as a whole. Overall Muslims are most concentrated in Marathwada, which was formerly part of Hyderabad State, and the Mumbai metropolitan area. Nagpur division in eastern Vidarbha, which was under direct Muslim rule very briefly, has a very low concentration of Muslims except for Nagpur city, and in rural areas there nearly the entire population is non-Muslim.

Malegaon and Bhiwandi, both centres of the textile industry, have Muslim majorities. Other cities with a large Muslim population are Nanded and Aurangabad.

Muslim population in districts of Maharashtra
District	Muslim population	Muslim %
Ahmadnagar	320,743	7.06
Akola	357,253	19.70
Amravati	421,410	14.59
Aurangabad	786,677	21.25
Bhandara	26,502	2.21
Beed	320,395	12.39
Buldhana	354,236	13.70
Chandrapur	92,297	4.19
Dhule	187,901	9.16
Gadchiroli	21,063	1.96
Gondia	26,157	1.98
Hingoli	127,552	10.83
Jalgaon	560,261	13.25
Jalna	274,221	14.00
Kolhapur	286,558	7.39
Latur	367,664	14.98
Mumbai City	773,173	25.06
Mumbai Suburban	1,795,788	19.19
Nagpur	390,974	8.40
Nanded	471,951	14.04
Nandurbar	96,182	5.84
Nashik	693,052	11.35
Osmanabad	178,925	10.79
Palghar	172,185	5.76
Parbhani	306,364	16.69
Pune	673,704	7.14
Raigad	227,465	8.64
Ratnagiri	187,197	11.59
Sangli	239,607	8.49
Satara	146,970	4.89
Sindhudurg	26,264	3.09
Solapur	441,254	10.22
Thane	1,183,445	14.66
Wardha	53,854	4.14
Washim	142,672	11.92
Yavatmal	239,236	8.63
Maharastra	12,971,152	11.54

== See also ==
- Christianity in Maharashtra
- Islam in India
