= Marathi Buddhists =

Buddhists of Marathi ethnic and linguistic identity

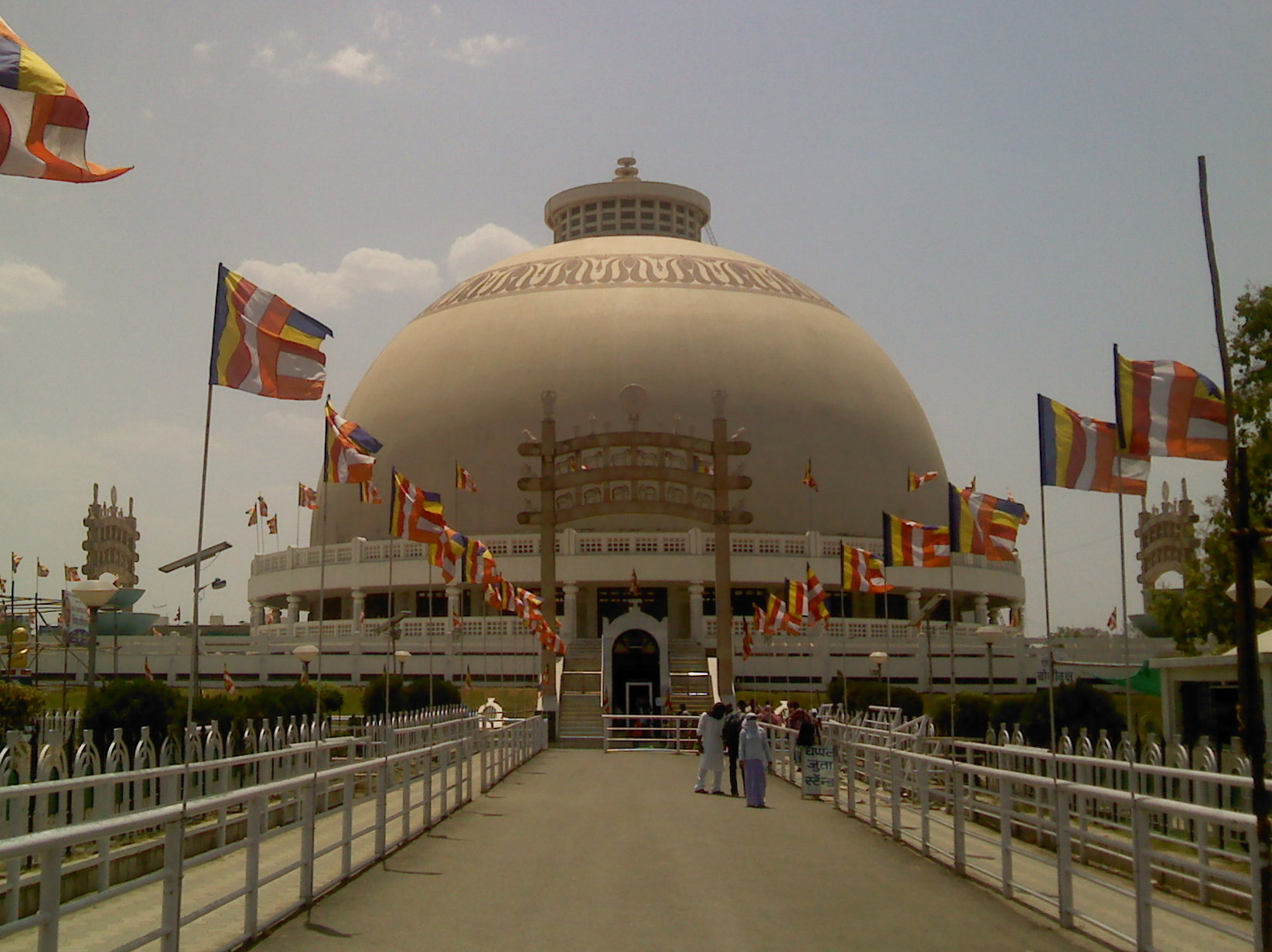
- Deekshabhoomi monument, located in Nagpur, Maharashtra, where B. R. Ambedkar converted to Buddhism in 1956, is the largest stupa in Asia.

Total population
- India 6,531,200 (2011)

Regions with significant populations
- Maharashtra

Religions
- Navayana Buddhism

Languages
- Marathi

Marathi Buddhists (Marāṭhī Bauddha) are Buddhists of Marathi ethnic and linguistic identity. The religious community resides in the Indian state of Maharashtra. They speak Marathi as their mother-tongue (first language). The Marathi Buddhist community is the largest Buddhist community in India. According to the 2011 Indian census, Marathi Buddhists constitute 5.81% of the population in Maharashtra, which is 77% of the total Buddhist population in India.

== History ==
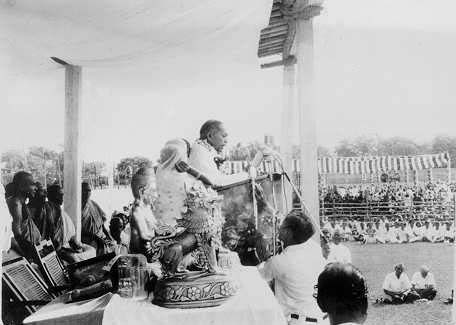
Ambedkar delivering speech during conversion, Nagpur, 14 October 1956

Almost all Marathi Buddhists belong to the Navayana tradition, a 20th-century Buddhist revival movement in India that received its most substantial impetus from B. R. Ambedkar who called for the conversion to Buddhism by rejecting the caste-based society of Hinduism. This was through a socio-religious movement and the term "Navayana" was used to "simplify the present cultural complexities" in other sects of Buddhism. Overall this was not a completely new sect culturally and ritually as it borrows most of its traditions from Theravada sect of Sri Lanka. B. R. Ambedkar publicly converted on 14 October 1956, at Deekshabhoomi, Nagpur, over 20 years after he declared his intent to convert. He converted approximately 600,000 people to Buddhism. The conversion ceremony was attended by Medharathi, his main disciple Bhoj Dev Mudit, and Mahastvir Bodhanand's Sri Lankan successor, Bhante Pragyanand. Ambedkar asked the oppressed classes not to get entangled in the existing branches of Buddhism (Theravada, Mahayana and Vajrayana), and called his version Navayana or 'Neo-Buddhism'. Ambedkar would die less than two months later, just after finishing his definitive work on Buddhism. Many Buddhists employ the term "Ambedkarite Buddhism" to designate the Buddhist movement, which started with Ambedkar's conversion. Converted people call themselves "Bauddha" i.e. Buddhists.

== Population ==
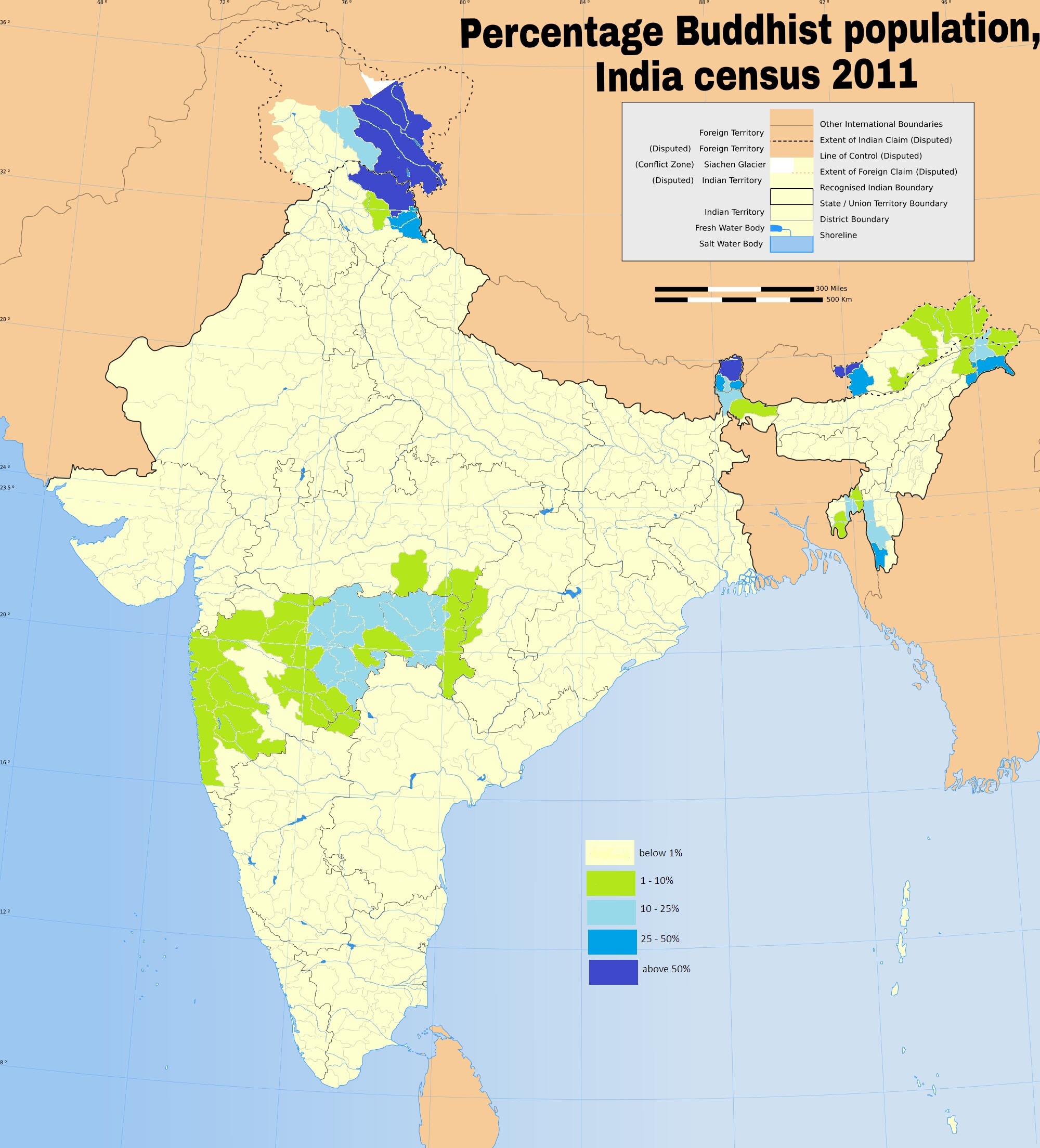
District wise Buddhist population percentage, India census 2011. India's West-centre area, Maharashtra shows Marathi Buddhist population.

Almost all Marathi Buddhists are converts from Hinduism. Most Buddhist Marathi people belong to the former Mahar community who adopted Buddhism with Ambedkar in 1956.

In the 1951 census of India, In Maharashtra, 2,487 (0.01%) respondents said they were Buddhist. The 1961 census, taken after B. R. Ambedkar adopted Navayana Buddhism with his millions of followers in 1956, showed an increase to 2,789,501 (7.05%).

Marathi Buddhists account for 77.36% of all Buddhists in India. According to the 2011 Census of India there are 6.5 million Buddhists in Maharashtra but Buddhist leaders claim there are about 10 to 12 million Buddhists in Maharashtra. Among cities Mumbai has largest Buddhist population accounting for 4.85% of total Mumbai population. Almost 90 per cent of Navayana Buddhists live in the state. 5,204,284 (79.68%) Marathi Buddhists belong to the Scheduled Caste category.

== Notable Marathi Buddhists ==
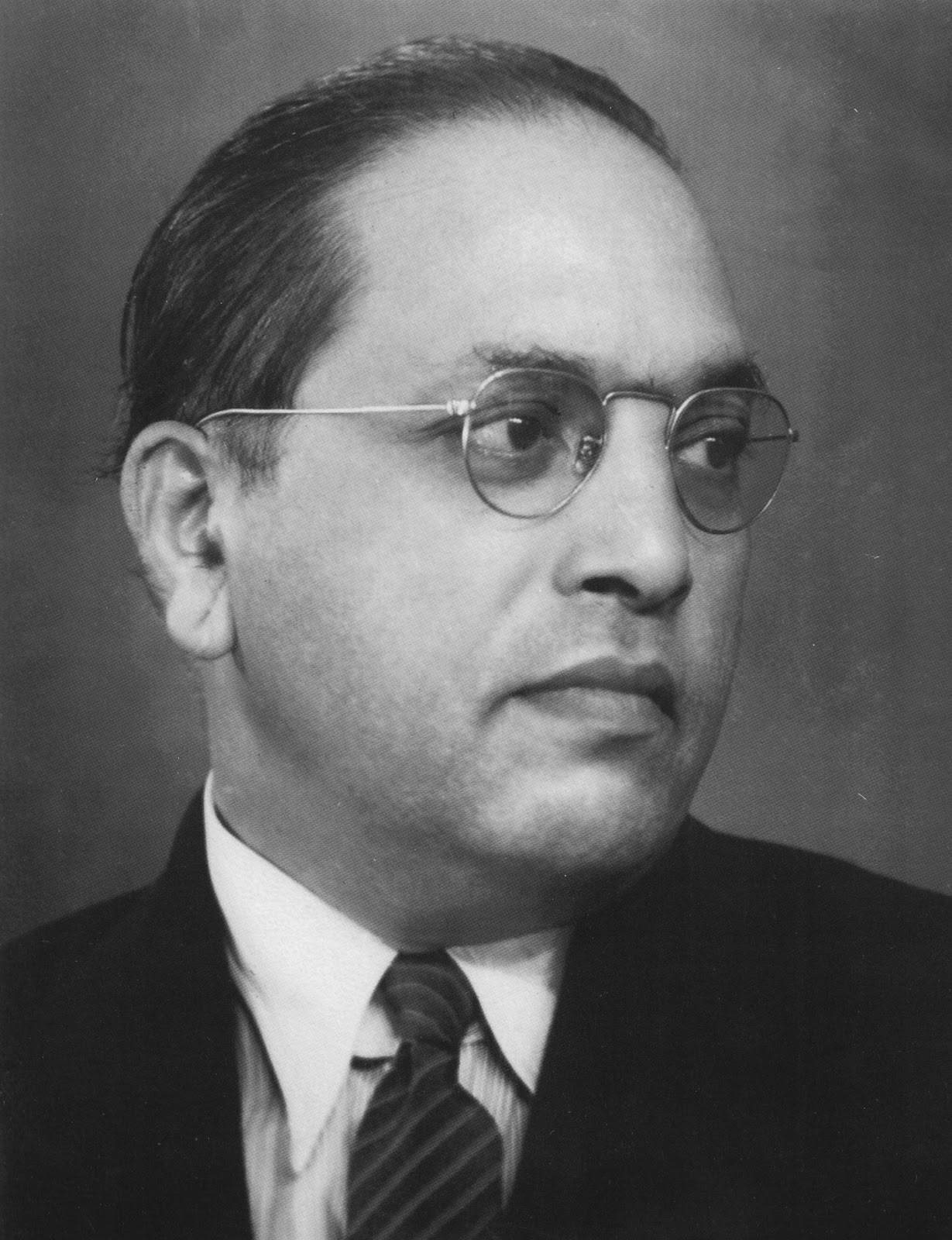
B. R. Ambedkar, Marathi scholar and the revivalist of Buddhism in India

- B. R. Ambedkar (1891–1956), jurist, barrister, and first Law and Justice Minister of India
- R. D. Bhandare (born 1916), governor of Bihar and Andhra Pradesh
- Bhushan Gavai (born 1960), the current and 52nd Chief Justice of India
- Sunil Baliram Gaikwad Member of Parliament 16th loksabha, author, advocate
- B. C. Kamble (born 1919), jurist and lawyer
- Sanjay Bansode, state minister of Maharashtra
- Murlidhar Chandrakant Bhandare, Governor of Odisha
- B. D. Khobragade, Deputy Chairman of the Rajya Sabha
- Mukul Wasnik, Minister for Social Justice and Empowerment
- Nashikrao Tirpude, first Deputy Chief Minister of Maharashtra
- Raja Dhale (1940–2019), social activist and writer
- Namdeo Dhasal (1949–2014), Padma Shri social activist and writer

== Culture ==
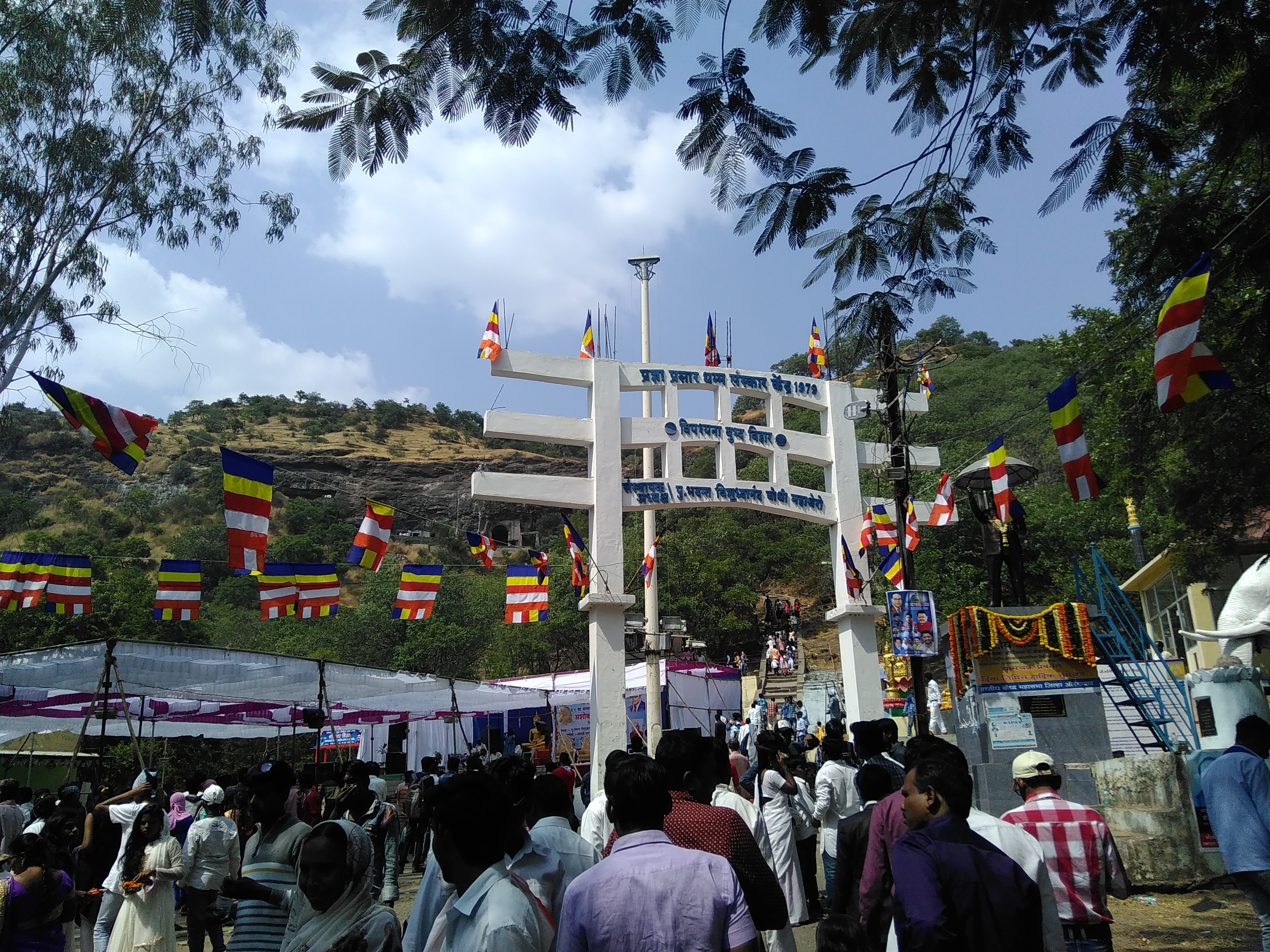
Marathi Buddhists are celebrating 62nd Dhammachakra Pravartan Din at Aurangabad Caves area in Aurangabad, Maharashtra on 18 October 2018.

=== Festivals ===
- Buddha Purnima, public holiday in Maharashtra
- Babasaheb Ambedkar Jayanti, public holiday in Maharashtra
- Dhammachakra Pravartan Day, public holiday in Maharashtra
- Ashadha Puja
- Magha Puja

== See also ==
- Buddhist Society of India
- Dalit Buddhist movement
- Lord Buddha TV
- Marathi people
- Religion in Maharashtra
- Buddhism in Mizoram
