= List of towns and villages in Latur district =

This is list of towns and villages of Latur district in the Indian state of Maharashtra's Aurangabad district (also called Chatrapati Sambhajinagar).

Until 1 August 2014 the district was divided into 10 talukas.

The following are separate Talukawise (subdistrict) lists of towns/villages in the Latur district.

== Ahmedpur Taluka ==
Town/village name	Population	Literacy(in %)	Sex ratio
Ajani Kh	1,178	80.46	954
Ambegaon	1,003	81.36	889
Anandwadi	606	71.29	876
Anandwadi	823	73.84	969
Andhori	4,546	80.34	909
Babaldara	1,077	75.85	930
Belur	1,565	76.88	969
Bhutekarwadi	654	67.88	964
Bodkha	1,259	78.28	874
Borgaon Kh.	460	82.13	925
Brahmapuri	838	73.46	918
Brahmawadi	621	75.39	876
Chikhali	3,538	78.84	928
Chilkha	875	75.83	1,025
Chopali	1,486	73.03	1,047
Dagadwadi	874	73.02	942
Devkara	1,753	74.64	901
Dhalegaon	3,320	74.5	903
Dhanora Bk.	3,202	76.4	921
Dhanora Kh.	1,175	77.69	901
Dhaswadi	2,511	75.75	968
Fattepur	348	75.17	1,023
Gadewadi	847	80.33	798
Gangahipparga	2,208	67.68	993
Gothala	1,246	71.2	846
Gudalewadi	1,185	67.25	908
Gugdal	783	67.42	992
Gunjoti	1,830	72.29	949
Hadolti	8,053	75.86	962
Hagdal	998	76.03	815
Halni	1,370	73.81	941
Hangarga	951	73.51	957
Hasarni	1,002	78.79	969
Himppalgaon	2,186	73.17	980
Hingangaon	838	86.53	926
Hipparga	1,399	77.86	906
Hipparga Kajal	2,144	73.78	1,015
Jamb	547	63.85	1,011
Jawalga	351	88.25	929
Kalegaon	1,788	78.91	886
Kaudgaon	678	71.26	899
Kendrewadi	1,012	78.18	924
Khanapur	738	76.33	989
Khandali	4,417	69.35	916
Kharabwadi	1,468	79.02	799
Kingaon	11,286	76.51	932
Kinikadu	1,248	80.02	849
Kokanga	1,140	76.78	860
Kolwadi	1,096	61.33	851
Kopra	2,154	73.79	903
Kumtha	3,726	75.44	922
Lanji	1,529	67.92	926
Lendhegaon	815	75.9	969
Lingdhal	906	74.75	953
Mahadeowadi	702	81.28	977
Makani	2,033	69.36	938
Malegaon Kh.	1,153	76.3	922
Mandni	1,570	71.48	912
Mangdari	694	63.44	912
Mankhed	994	78.51	834
Marshiwani Tanda	392	59.24	806
Mawalgaon	1,277	75.11	909
Methi	919	77.79	883
Mogha	1,197	75.02	934
Mohgaon	1,171	77.33	917
Molwan	853	70.86	1,002
Morewadi	631	72.37	984
Mulki	910	72.51	846
Nagthana	895	74.05	853
Nagzari	1,049	72.48	904
Nandura Bk.	1,666	74.06	876
Nandura Kh.	973	76.83	836
Narwatwadi	674	65.86	847
Par	474	71.15	866
Parchanda	1,933	71.72	923
Patoda	826	77.76	921
Ralga	1,240	55.28	1,081
Rudha	1,374	78.03	914
Rui	1,591	71.65	938
Rui Tanda	262	60.39	871
Salgara	721	71.15	1,072
Sangvi	1,843	69.24	843
Satala	3,253	75.69	917
Sawargaon Rokda	3,626	76.76	953
Sawargaon Thot	1,776	71.37	873
Sayyadpur	1,048	78.96	858
Senkud	874	75.2	947
Shendri	152	75.19	900
Shenni	501	83.73	965
Shirur Tajband	10,577	79.6	938
Shivankhed	3,209	75.37	847
Sindgi Bk.	1,817	72.34	919
Sindgi Kh.	1,175	70.3	895
Sonkhed	701	77.29	895
Sora	645	69.33	812
Sumthana	1,297	76.53	986
Sunegaon	729	70.35	970
Sunegaon	637	70.98	924
Takalgaon	3,106	71.14	1,014
Takalgaon	506	76.39	867
Talegaon	1,359	78.36	975
Tambat Sangvi	768	77.16	906
Telgaon	1,989	72.64	952
Temburni	1,062	78.81	938
Thodga	2,587	71.85	941
Thorliwadi	744	71.61	1,050
Tirth	1,439	74.5	859
Ugilewadi	390	75.85	960
Ujana	3,616	67.17	971
Umarga Kort	2,120	71.27	961
Umarga Yelladevi	2,067	78.26	950
Unni	670	72.59	903
Vhotala	389	81.68	870
Vilegaon	1,876	75.72	981
Wadarwadi	353	66.12	783
Waigaon	2,081	78.78	865
Wairagadh	740	73.38	805
Walsangi	2,743	77.08	918
Wanjarwadi	566	71.94	808
Warwanti	808	66.71	726
Warwanti Tanda	533	60.72	832
Yeldarwadi	1,006	75.99	898
Yertar	1,029	73.3%	895

== Ausa Taluka ==
Village	Population	Literacy	Sex Ratio
Almala	4,290	78.15	910
Anandwadi	900	75.23	952
Andora	2,324	71.57	946
Apchunda	2,146	74.55	891
Ashiv	6,018	73.6	956
Ausa	36,118	79.57	949
Ausa (rural)	653	69.83	871
Banegaon	1,164	76.62	1,079
Barhanpur	867	74.77	931
Belkund	2,878	76.25	951
Bhada	5,938	73.93	922
Bhangewadi	1,522	74.64	924
Bheta	3,725	75.74	943
Bhusani	1,666	75.86	917
Birawali	2,428	70.85	950
Borgaon	2,182	68.43	911
Borphal	3,733	70.87	900
Budhada	3,762	74.64	947
Chalburga	1,643	73.61	933
Chincholi Jo	992	84.08	926
Chincholi Kajale	2,643	77.1	921
Chincholi Son	1,097	76.75	901
Chincholi Tapse	3,143	72.14	951
Dapegaon	1,696	78.06	919
Dautpur	2,007	72.37	985
Dewanga	798	71.43	1,036
Dhanora	1,477	79.94	882
Fattepur	1,570	76.46	889
Gadhawewadi	1,216	81.88	949
Ganjankheda	692	77.3	901
Gondri	2,623	74.96	923
Gotewadi	299	92.34	1,034
Gubal	1,790	73.64	914
Gulkheda	2,015	72.83	974
Haldurg	294	70.9	861
Haregaon	3,088	74.73	918
Hasala	729	75.5%	934
Hasalgan	3,333	69.42	929
Hasegaon	2,789	68.84	892
Hasegaon Wadi	2,482	67.87	900
Hatkarwadi			
Hippar Soga	1,647	76.91	980
Hipparga	2,766	76.59	940
Holi	1,531	73.54	885
Jainagar	925	78.25	911
Jamalpur	1,158	82.97	914
Jauwadi	729	70	884
Jawalga P D	2,937	75.47	896
Jawli	2,856	78.84	919
Jayphal	1,251	72.41	958
Kalmata	1,897	67.17	928
Kanheri	1,349	77.34	892
Karajgaon	2,139	74.35	984
Karla	3,540	74.63	958
Kawali	1,166	73.85	902
Kawtha Kej	952	78.12	963
Kawtha Latur	501	76.61	862
Khanapur	460	61.41	840
Kharosa	5,825	73.09	927
Khuntegaon	2,742	72.13	920
Khurdwadi			
Killari	15,958	78.38	961
Killariwadi	731	82.03	1,014
Kininawre	2,472	73.15	924
Kinithot	2,424	69.89	900
Korangala	2,256	72.22	899
Kumtha	1,787	74.1	947
Lakhangaon	1,893	77.83	884
Lamjana	8,595	72.7	936
Limbala Dau	2,576	73.72	927
Lodga	2,872	78.2	990
Lohta	1,176	78.72	957
Malkondji	2,590	74.14	995
Malubra	723	82.15	863
Manjrul	2,478	80.86	887
Masalga Kh.	643	77.12	897
Masurdi	1,971	76	870
Matola	7,185	78.78	869
Mogarga	2,630	75.47	960
Mugalewadi	440	78.99	964
Nagarsoga	4,129	74.32	887
Naholi	167	87.86	920
Nandurga	3,966	74.25	921
Pardhewadi	1,050	69.99	895
Pirangaj Wadi			
Rajewadi	639	64.95	885
Ramegaon	2,235	72.35	918
Ramwadi	293	73.11	831
Ringani	315	78.57	886
Samdarga	1,695	79.11	948
Sankral	672	86.21	926
sarni	1,112	74.22	934
Sarola	2,237	74.75	920
Satdharwadi	2,223	70.66	830
Satdharwadi Laman Tanda	363	62.58	891
Selu	3,278	73.17	901
Shivani Bk.	2,473	75.6%	955
Shivani Lakh	2,374	67.78	995
Shivli	4,114	70.91	863
Sindala Jahagir	640	75.69	981
Sindala Lohara	2,959	84.55	580
Sindalwadi	1,168	83.56	934
Sirsal	1,942	78.42	934
Taka	3,543	73.43%	952
Talani	3,212	78.14	950
Talani Laman Tanda	591	67.47	888
Tambarwadi	1,654	77.59	846
Tavshi Tad	2,211	75.44	929
Tondoli	250	84.38	908
Tungi Bk.	3,591	72.31	901
Tungi Kh.	333	75.6	840
Ujani	7,219	76.37	951
Umbadga Bk.	1,331	82.98%	912
Umbadga Kh.	1,097	72.87	875
Uti Bk.	2,054	70.88	981
Utka	2,401	78.99	958
Wadji	1,157	61.82	961
Wagholi	1,388	75.78	912
Wagjewadi			
Wangji	1,494	75.16	933
Wanwada	2,133	79.37	997
Warwada	1,732	69.12	984
Yakatpur	2,441	76.12	891
Yekambi	1,593	71.39	903
Yekambi Laman Tanda	2,380	68.64	889
Yekambiwadi	579	69.41	892
Yelavat	984	75.09	878
Yeli	1,900	73.72	929
Yelori	1,819	72.89	917
Yeloriwadi	641	71.96	837
Yerandi	1,298	76.51	958

== Chakur Taluka ==
Village name	Population	Literacy	Sex Ratio
Ajansonda Kh.	1,302	74.38	1,006
Algarwadi	1,761	72.82	972
Ambulga	1,421	75.04	976
Anandwadi	2,173	77.6	537
Anjansoda Bk.	3,160	75.16	919
Ashta	4,039	78.69	926
Atola	3,178	77.74	948
Bansawargaon	678	83.3	994
Basawnal			
Bawalgaon	779	75.72	952
Belgaon	1,246	73.44	929
Bhakarwadi	541	74.78	974
Bhatsangvi	1,181	73.62	936
Bolegaon	586	79.56	934
Borgaon Bk.	1,235	76.52	939
Bothi	3,119	71.38	929
Brahamwadi	704	74.6	983
Bramhawadi	1,111	65.45	906
Chakur	18,627	80.75	944
Chapoli	7,230	80.44	949
Chavlewadi	334	83.16	835
Dapkyal	1,293	75.59	971
Devangra	2,850	75.82	948
Devangrawadi	554	71.04	965
Dongraj	2,652	73.22	904
Ganjur	2,370	72.83	922
Ganjurwadi	1,062	77.88	970
Gharni	4,775	73.66	945
Gharola	1,877	79.64	904
Hadoli	1,130	67.92	952
Hali Kh	2,540	77%	984
Hanmant Jawalga	1,518	72.1	907
Hanmantwadi	793	61.71	915
Hatkarwadi	330	62.92	854
Hatkarwadi	672	79.89	802
Hipalner	2,196	73.59	933
Honali			
Jagalpur Kh.	1,298	79.97	887
Janwal	6,171	75.69	905
Jathala	2,903	73.88	886
Kabansangvi	2,419	75.97	967
Kadmuli	1,397	81.88	885
Kalkoti	1,352	78.58	994
Kawathali	1,212	72.83	924
Kendrewadi	723	72.39	859
Latur Road	2,864	75.98	939
Limbalwadi	1,055	76.66	998
Mahadol	1,122	76.98	948
Mahalangra	2,162	73.12	930
Mahalangra Wadi	825	79.8	871
Mahalungi	1,899	70.02	936
Mandurki	1,012	74.71	1,044
Mashanerwadi	1,015	73.01	944
Mohadal	642	82.52	928
Mohanal	856	78.49	861
Murambi	1,071	77.02	954
Nagadarwadi	797	87.05	925
Nageshwadi	1,573	74.63	902
Naigaon	2,097	78.4	927
Nalegaon	14,901	78.31	919
Nandgaon	1,429	78.13	976
Rachannawadi	1,737	68.01	870
Raiwadi	1,592	74.41	958
Rajewadi	335	71.24	959
Ramwadi	370	74.06	1,011
Rohina	3,604	77.49	956
Sandol	760	68.73	979
Sangyachiwadi	365	89.54	1,017
Saranwadi	617	69.37	990
Shelgaon	1,878	74.02	916
Shirnal	871	73.84	910
Shiwani Majra	579	76.62	911
Shiwankheda Bk.	3,377	77.21	912
Sugaon	5,208	73.97	950
Takalgaon	831	77.36	937
Talghal	244	77.99	968
Tirthwadi	703	86.78	947
Tiwatghal	998	84.85	968
Tiwghal	1,653	82.23	1,006
Ujalamb	2,612	74.51	919
Wadgaon	1,853	76.32	922
Wadwal Nagnath	7,841	80.84	940
Wagholi	896	79.39	910
Zari Bk	3,624	71.19	907
Zari Kh.	1,596	72.18	980

== Deoni Taluka ==
Village	Population	Literacy	Sex-ratio
Deoni Bk.	12899	66.24	957
Walandi	5262	67.08	944
Jawalga	4963	64.32	956
Borol	4159	61.19	946
Dhanegaon	3086	66.79	910
Dawan Hipparga	3037	73.99	963
Helamb	2942	60.81	965
Vilegaon	2831	60.65	928
Lasona	2605	67.49	923
Kawathala	2554	61.16	935
Talegaon (bhogeshwar)	2501	65.49	922
Chawan Hipparga	2437	63.07	923
Gaundgaon	2099	64.41	997
Honali	2062	64.45	949
Konali (N)	1971	64.64	925
Takali (walandi)	1911	66.61	903
Gurdhal (her)	1895	70.92	938
Devani Kh	1818	60.78	936
Hisamnagar	1758	66.55	932
Wadmurambi	1682	65.99	942
Sayyadpur	1632	64.15	893
Nagral	1604	68.64	951
Gurnal	1592	58.67	1005
Kamaroddinpur	1552	68.43	923
Sawargaon	1479	71.53	933
Ambegaon	1465	67.44	969
Neknal	1404	64.6	1000
Kamalwadi	1379	63.89	940
Indral	1367	63.28	931
Bhopani	1357	74.58	933
Achwala	1351	65.36	944
Hanchanal	1322	72.39	985
Bombli Kh	1246	63.56	978
Wagadari [walandi]	1212	68.15	952
Ambanagar	1006	63.22	887
Batanpur	1005	65.77	886
Bombali Bk.	968	73.24	887
Sangam	945	69.95	1006
Anandwadi	920	69.13	1009
Ajani	920	59.35	949
Bolegaon	910	57.14	936
Sindhikamth	823	56.99	918
Darewadi	771	62	952
Dhangarwadi	702	71.94	945
Manki	700	71	1047
Ismailwadi	644	59.16	1006
Wagnalwadi	575	66.43	983
Nagtirthawadi	552	66.12	951
Anantwadi	494	68.62	945
Shivajinagar Tanda	413	62.23	1005
Mahadevwadi	378	73.54	909
Dongarewadi	275	65.82	1007
Mamdapur	163	72.39	964
Dharmapuri	1,351	65.36	944

== Jalkot Taluka ==
Town/village name	Population	Literacy	Sex ratio
Jalkot	9356	66.42	937
Gutti	4051	56.55	969
Wanjarwada	3908	58.32	950
Malihapparga	3425	61.23	906
Atnoor	3226	65.87	933
Ghonsi	3119	62.87	903
Patoda Bk.	2933	70.68	931
Rawankola	2895	55.34	971
Chera	2807	61.24	968
Jagalpur Bk.	2679	63.08	941
Mangrul	2560	67.38	912
Kunki	2381	65.6	981
Dhamangaon	2340	64.7	926
Sonwala	2264	67.09	877
Marsangvi	2249	55.76	924
Tiruka	2234	63.56	936
Hokarna	2145	73.99	972
Umarga Retu	1760	63.47	940
Gawhan	1750	64.8	1047
Kolnoor	1710	69.06	968
Kekat Sindgi	1686	64.23	940
Karanji	1444	62.67	913
Sulhali	1418	64.95	868
Umardara	1342	65.95	917
Sheldara	1331	67.39	957
Dongargaon	1253	67.52	890
Yeori	1197	72.6	862
Belsangvi	1189	66.61	835
Lali Bk.	1178	64.01	987
Konali Dongar	1162	75.9	930
Lali Kh.	1135	71.28	960
Mewapur	1100	57.82	874
Hawarga	1073	69.52	972
Viral	1060	70	934
Ekurka Kh.	1033	63.21	938
Dhorsangvi	1014	63.21	943
Halad Wadhavana	994	55.94	938
Patoda Kh.	986	62.07	860
Yeldara	888	67.68	930
Domgaon	882	65.19	934
Shivajinagar Tanda	771	49.55	918
Borgaon Kh.	724	71.27	856
Chincholi	607	63.43	946
Dhondwadi (Ghonsi)	605	55.87	952
Wadgaon	574	57.14	1028
Jirga	443	73.81	987
Sorga	320	63.44	1000

== Latur Taluka ==
sr.no.	Village/Town name	Population	Literacy(%)	Sex Ratio
1	Akharwai	1,866	76.01	866
2	Akoli	2,703	71.12	916
3	Anandwadi			
4	Arvi	14,015	81.15	909
5	Babhalgaon	7,353	74.73	889
6	Bamni	1,956	80.37	931
7	Baswantpur	1,370	78.29	854
8	Bhadgaon	1,743	74.03	924
9	Bhadi	1,242	74.62	941
10	Bhatangali	4,084	70.06	972
11	Bhatkheda	2,283	72.56	890
12	Bhosa	1,847	65.9	944
13	Bhoyara	1,805	69.95	958
14	Bhuisamudraga	2,710	73.76	930
15	Bindgihal	1,184	76.89	888
16	Bodkha	1,087	67.71	1,006
17	Bokangaon	1,685	73.66	915
18	Bopala	1,530	71.82	995
19	Borgaon Bk.	4,635	73.46	950
20	Bori	3,797	76.72	923
21	Borwati	1,779	72.98	957
22	Chandeshwar	2,023	74.96	930
23	Chata	1,888	80.46	963
24	Chikhal Thana	1,703	75.12	1,047
25	Chikhurda	2,380	71.28	944
26	Chincholi Ballalnath	5,053	72.71	909
27	Chincholi Rao	2,468	75.59	805
28	Chincholi Raowadi	1,899	70.65	924
29	Dagadwadi	493	80.77	896
30	Dhakani	1,317	74.16	948
31	Dhanegaon	2,148	75.46	949
32	Dhanori	847	74.11	961
33	Dhoki	1,144	79.98	854
34	Dindegaon	521	74.13	1,043
35	Ekurga	3,209	67.8	944
36	Gadhawad	3,964	76.12	957
37	Gangapur	5,902	70.57	922
38	Ganjur	867	76.89	940
39	Gategaon	3,216	78.88	867
40	Gondegaon	2,119	70.08	949
41	Gumphawadi	1,383	71.75	910
42	Hanamantwadi	710	77.66	854
43	Harangul Bk	8,123	76.94	793
44	Harangul Kh.	3,772	71.47	917
45	Hisori	904	70.1	982
46	Jawala Bk.	2,437	71.3	916
47	Jewali	2,308	76.34	895
48	Kanadi Borgaon	1,707	72.34	855
49	Karkatta	1,842	77.88	909
50	Karsa	1,043	70.52	876
51	Kasar Jawala	1,845	72.01	950
52	Kasargaon	1,325	74.41	912
53	Kasarkheda	2,611	77.63	920
54	Katgaon	3,252	70.98	875
55	Katpur	2,019	74.57	898
56	Kavha	3,067	73.55	866
57	Khadgaon	1,538	72.08	844
58	Khandala	1,036	72.29	922
59	Khandapur	4,701	81.92	472
60	Khopegaon	1,830	75.92	932
61	Khulgapur	1,471	79.06	943
62	Khuntephal	691	80.13	868
63	Kolpa	1,384	75.72	1,069
64	Krishnanagar	712	62.72	889
65	Latur	382,940	84.22	937
66	Mahamdapur	1,167	75.49	913
67	Mahapur	3,449	75.27	860
68	Maharanapratapnagar	9,330	74.61	949
69	Malwati	1,777	76.37	959
79	Manjari	2,118	68.08	871
71	Masala	1,454	79.07	896
72	Matephal	2,335	72.02	943
73	Murud Akola	2,573	78.47	961
74	Murud Bk.	25,978	78.46	926
75	Mushirabad	1,605	66.33	899
76	Nagzari	1,503	70.31	932
77	Nandgaon	2,947	72.83	899
78	Nilkanth	412	75.35	907
79	Niwali	5,268	72.78	907
80	Pakharsangvi	8,580	76.66	902
81	Peth	2,196	78.77	935
82	Pimpalgaon Amba	1,133	79.5	891
83	Pimpri Amba	2,011	70.91	951
84	Raiwadi	1,285	74.62	857
85	Ramegaon	2,062	72.21	927
86	Rameshwar	1,562	71.78	975
87	Ramzanpur	668	75.22	1,037
88	Rui	1,321	69.82	893
89	Sai	2,039	75.46	936
90	Sakhara	1,954	74.75	919
91	Salgara Bk.	1,978	72.9%	1,029
92	Salgara Kh.	938	76.06	971
93	Samangaon	1,393	79.17	850
94	Sarola	1,957	77.41	951
95	Sarsa	2,302	75.89	842
96	Sawargaon	1,640	75.74	971
97	Sevadasnagar	810	80.36	617
98	Shelu Bk.	1,076	71.89	1,011
99	Shirala	3,285	76.07	902
100	Shiur	1,877	73.4%	868
101	Shivani Kh.	1,452	74.45	949
102	Shriramnagar	1,258	69.65	972
103	Shyamnagar	3,216	66.13	885
104	Sikandarpur	1,554	69.11	888
105	Sirsi	994	76.9	961
106	Sonavati	2,813	73.59	956
107	Tadki	386	72.62	911
108	Takalgaon	1,043	73.68	907
109	Takali Bardpur	2,702	76.93	936
110	Takali Shiradhon	1,387	69.29	869
111	Tandulja	4,252	71.66	908
112	Tandulwadi	1,102	76.72	917
113	Umarga	1,447	74.58	953
114	Uti Kh.	526	71.87	1,063
115	Vilasnagar	2,415	76.65	675
116	Wadi Wagholi	692	73.42	949
117	Wagholi	3,646	75.07	866
118	Wakadi	499	79.31	912
119	Wanjarkheda	3,155	74.49	889
120	Wanjarkheda Tanda	860	70.22	752
121	Warwanti	1,976	75.94	918
122	Wasangaon	2,097	84.09	931
123	Yeli	1,725	71.5	887

== Nilanga Taluka ==
sr.no.	Village/town name	Population	Literacy	Sex Ratio
1	Ambewadi Ambulga Bk.	153	71.85	937
2	Ambewadi Masalga	1,398	66.31	944
3	Ambulga	1,618	72.17	956
4	Ambulga Bk.	4,960	72.65	993
5	Ambulga Men	1,166	78.63	881
6	Anandwadi	363	80.37	984
7	Anandwadi	524	80.18	912
8	Anandwadi	499	71.93	942
9	Anandwadi			
10	Anandwadi	221	77.27	956
11	Anandwadi	264	71.74	1,200
12	Anandwadi Ambulga Bk.	1,215	78.11	898
13	Ansarwada	2,853	68.13	965
14	Aundha	1,523	75.54	928
15	Aurad	14,536	76.33	957
16	Badur	3,239	71	996
17	Bamni	1,252	79.98	880
18	Barmachiwadi	265	76.42	906
19	Baspur	1,201	78.14	995
20	Bendga	1,035	82.61	931
21	Bhutmugli	2,191	74.87	863
22	Bolegaon Kh.	886	67.53	1,041
23	Borsuri	3,388	66.78	970
24	Borsuriwadi	194	75	813
25	Botkul	1,509	75.83	861
26	Bujrugwadi	965	70.01	900
27	Chandori	1,816	72.42	902
28	Chandoriwadi	427	69.44	915
29	Channachiwadi	448	86.4	874
30	Chichondi	2,025	73	949
31	Chilwantwadi	1,672	72.81	976
32	Chincholi	4,922	75.95	962
33	Chincholi	1,895	77.86	893
34	Chincholi	2,671	69.45	927
35	Dadgi	2,101	69.23	929
36	Dagadwadi	919	78.23	935
37	Dangewadi	561	87.16	996
38	Dapka	5,031	86	920
39	Dhanora	1,966	78.44	982
40	Dhobalewadi	795	83.21	871
41	Dongargaon [ha.]	836	81.2	917
42	Dukrewadi			
43	Fattewadi			
44	Gaur	3,053	78.66	951
45	Girakchal	455	91.48	1,004
46	Govindnagarwadi			
47	Gunewadi	15	46.67	1,143
48	Gunjarga	1,806	72.72	879
49	Gurhal	1,347	67.4	935
50	Hadga	2,735	75.81	923
51	Hadoli	1,432	74.05	1,011
52	Hagranga	2,147	75.23	897
53	Haidarwadi	185	69.38	713
54	Halgara	6,536	75.36	968
55	Hallali	1,750	69.66	934
56	Halsi Tugaon	3,285	71.16	947
57	Halsi [ha]	1,733	74.92	909
58	Hanchnal	645	77.35	870
59	Handral	605	67.11	939
60	Hanmantwadi	1,287	79.97	924
61	Hanmantwadi Halgara	737	72.1	866
62	Hanmantwadi [a.v.]			
63	Hanmantwadi [ha]	1,428	72.14	953
64	Hanmantwadi [mugaon]	464	76.83	966
65	Harijawalga	1,730	75.6	891
66	Hasori Bk.	2,582	71.5	893
67	Hasori Kh.	817	78.25	1,007
68	Hattarga [halsi]	1,744	75.15	889
69	Hosur	2,954	72.7	908
70	Jajnur	2,088	75.7%	1,008
71	Jamga	1,130	74.83	928
72	Jau	1,158	80.68	1,125
73	Jewari	1,803	69.57	878
74	Jotwadi	509	71.75	871
75	Kalandi	1,593	71.05	972
76	Kalmugali	1,795	71.37	1,012
77	Kamalwadi	511	76.01	893
78	Kamshetwadi			
79	Kamshetwadi			
80	Kasar Balkunda	4,178	69.18	967
81	Kasarshirshi	8,916	71.76	952
82	Katejawalga	2,453	73.22	1,014
83	Kedarpur	660	69.52	1,018
84	Kelgaon	4,464	72.63	933
85	Khadak Umarga	998	67.32	934
86	Kokalgaon	2,914	73.17	887
87	Korali	3,774	69.67	971
88	Koyachiwadi	432	60.31	946
89	Lambota	3,856	74.3	960
90	Limbala	1,360	76.4	902
91	Macharatwadi	398	90.94	851
92	Madansuri	4,636	82.63	964
93	Makni	1,969	74.61	963
94	Malegaon	2,525	66.98	1,041
95	Malegaon [je]	1,283	74.13	929
96	Malradwadi	139	69.35	1,044
97	Mamdapur	1,528	77.41	949
98	Manathpur	973	77.73	954
99	Mane Jawalga	1,715	73.01	893
100	Mangalwedwadi			
101	Masalga	2,199	74.04	924
102	Masobawadi	507	81.55	935
103	Mirgan Halli	1,757	66.69	893
104	Mubarakpur	2,688	86.1	902
105	Mudgad Ramling	4,452	70.38	877
106	Mudgad [ekoji]	2,692	75.46	945
107	Mugaon	1,420	72.85	969
108	Nadi Hattarga	2,601	73.12	924
109	Nadiwadi	889	75.56	916
110	Nanand	4,061	77.47	922
111	Nelwad	3,314	64.72	962
112	Nilanga	36,172	79.97	937
113	Nilkanthwadi	166	84.46	1,000
114	Nitur	6,397	74.79	941
115	Palapur	544	78.45	1,015
116	Pimpalwadi [je]	248	80.44	759
117	Pirupatelwadi	1,115	66.12	899
118	Pirwadi			
119	Rajewadi	233	64.08	792
120	Ramtirth	632	72.95	1,000
121	Rathoda	3,624	73.7	909
122	Sabitwadi	434	73.13	929
123	Sangaraddiwadi	711	67.93	986
124	Sangvi [je]	2,778	75.48	913
125	Sardarwadi	487	78.67	933
126	Sarwadi	3,077	83.52	914
127	Sawangira	942	78.69	983
128	Sawari	3,894	71.63	926
129	Shedol	3,848	73.6	945
130	Shelgi	2,255	72.9	931
131	Shend	1,409	74.76	960
132	Shindi Jawalga	2,055	78.22	877
133	Shiradhon	2,107	79.49	951
134	Shirol	3,183	76.82	929
135	Shiur	2,048	72.16	877
136	Shivani	2,650	78.24	963
137	Sindhkhed	2,334	72.76	975
138	Singnal	655	75.18	1,034
139	Sirshi	1,379	74.7	858
140	Sonesangvi	200	71.58	1,083
141	Sonkhed	1,515	71.77	898
142	Tadmugli	2,544	77.27	923
143	Tagarkheda	3,707	75.13	935
144	Tajpur	686	65.23	824
145	Takli	1,545	75.06	931
146	Talikhed	1,821	71.7	903
147	Tambala	4,330	65.39	916
148	Tambalwadi	616	76.81	872
149	Tambarwadi	1,223	82.53	914
150	Tupdi	1,866	75.25	938
151	Umarga [hadga]	2,588	73.91	870
152	Usturi	3,137	75.5	932
153	Wadgaon	1,447	76.83	899
154	Wadi	893	78.39	912
155	Wadi Hasori	47	72.22	1,043
156	Wadikasar Shirshi	1,132	45.85	1,032
157	Waksa	985	72.78	935
158	Walsangvi	895	73.51	896
159	Wanjarwada	920	77.35	921
160	Yelamwadi	531	79.53	952
161	Yelnur	2,121	74.61	906
162	Zari	1,816	80.79	965

== Renapur Taluka ==
sr.no.	Village	Population	Literacy	Sex Ratio
1	Anandwadi	708	79.27	839
2	Andalgaon	735	76.66	815
3	Arajkheda	1,691	79.05	999
4	Asrachiwadi	778	68.13	940
5	Bawchi	963	72.76	892
6	Bhandarwadi	1,633	79.24	917
7	Bhokaramba	2,289	71.79	941
8	Bitargaon	2,509	72.21	896
9	Brahmawadi	559	70.74	968
10	Chatgaon	1,043	74.12	1,006
11	Darji Borgaon	1,815	74.59	947
12	Dawangaon	1,541	72.01	850
13	Dhaweli	1,500	77.66	976
14	Dighol Deshmukh	2,390	74.68	951
15	Dighol Deshpande	486	61.71	936
16	Divegaon	663	79.51	852
17	Faradpur	832	76.91	895
18	Garsuli	2,183	71.3	983
19	Gavhan	1,306	77.5	832
20	Ghansargaon	2,507	75.32	921
21	Godhala	2,052	76.67	960
22	Hanumantwadi	1,246	78.31	896
23	Harwadi	1,981	72.4	918
24	Hoti	1,635	71.24	917
25	Indarthana	1,499	70.42	927
26	Itti	1,231	78.52	885
27	Jawalga	2,079	76.22	930
28	Kadepur	4,011	73.22	906
29	Kalewadi	506	68.43	931
30	Kamkheda	3,133	73.71	934
31	Khalangri	1,469	76.53	876
32	Khanapur	586	79.84	820
33	Kharola	7,469	76.39	926
34	Kolgaon	2,119	66.91	964
35	Kostagaon	3,094	76.19	910
36	Kumbhari	650	69.72	912
37	Kumbharwadi	1,324	74.12	873
38	Lahanewadi	284	74.02	797
39	Lakhamapur	1,158	78.6	917
40	Makegaon	1,592	82.12	930
41	Manusmarwadi	1,387	70.64	948
42	Mohgaon	952	77.32	931
43	Morwad	1,686	74.18	888
44	Motegaon	2,459	76.87	914
45	Murdhav	1,549	77.15	912
46	Muslewadi	1,534	74.96	969
47	Nagapur	299	81.59	857
48	Narvatwadi	464	74.81	909
49	Nehru Nagar	455	81.27	904
50	Niwada	2,131	76.56	918
51	Palsi	1,350	81.24	923
52	Pangaon	11,661	76.17	934
53	Patharwadi	1,500	76.48	966
54	Phawde Wadi	1,585	70.78	912
55	Poharegaon Tanda	491	74.53	925
56	Pohregaon	3,498	77.51	945
57	Ramwadi	543	71.31	872
58	Ramwadi	1,052	78.53	913
59	Renapur	14,953	74.81	923
60	Rupchand Nagar	1,711	83.59	771
61	Samsapur	1,840	75.12	885
62	Sangvi	1,525	74.77	945
63	Sarola	1,078	75.32	922
64	Saygaon	344	70.33	859
65	Sayyadpur Bk.	1,043	71.33	939
66	Seva Nagar	811	71.92	877
67	Sevalalnagar	406	53.41	933
68	Shelu Kh.	936	82.07	825
69	Shera	2,159	73.33	990
70	Sindhgaon	2,506	74.08	947
71	Sukani	341	82.72	1,042
72	Sumthana	1,147	78.34	899
73	Takalgaon	954	70.42	885
74	Talni	2,197	73.37	910
75	Tattapur	1,287	76.82	909
76	Vanjarwadi	1,273	80.9	889
77	Wala	1,589	72.69	921
78	Wangdari	1,650	74.01	943
79	Yeshwant Wadi	592	85.58	987

== Shirur Anantpal Taluka ==
sr.no.	village name	population	Literacy	Sex ratio
1	Aari	829	73.55	932
2	Ajani Bk.	1,744	72.56	1,079
3	Anandwadi	892	80.13	939
4	Ankulga	2,051	79.16	963
5	Ankulga	1,742	74.61	938
6	Bakali	2,024	68.79	948
7	Bevanal	961	76.93	941
8	Bevanalwadi	744	76.05	855
9	Bhingoli	920	79.9	941
10	Bibral	1,013	72.77	845
11	Bolegaon Bk.	1,843	71.53	944
12	Chamarga	1,206	88.4	948
13	Daithana	2,030	79.15	950
14	Dhamangaon	1,534	74.91	899
15	Dighol	2,331	74.84	914
16	Dongargaon	1,089	77.57	881
17	Fakranpur	351	75.25	1,102
18	Ganeshwadi	1,268	75.86	895
19	Ghugi	651	69.73	803
20	Halki	2,628	75.19	938
21	Hippalgaon	2,583	71.25	922
22	Hisamabad	4,197	76.15	989
23	Honmal	618	74.53	913
24	Jogyal	690	80.74	896
25	Kalamgaon	1,431	83.53	952
26	Kambalga	1,508	76.92	909
27	Kanegaon	1,306	76.37	904
28	Karewadi	965	70.61	892
29	Lakkadjawalga	1,133	83.04	917
30	Nagewadi	798	74.36	951
31	Pandharwadi	697	77.17	1,081
32	Rapka	935	78.29	973
33	Sakol	7,696	77.13	965
34	Sangvi	764	71.56	969
35	Sarpharajpur	267	81.56	1,070
36	Sawargaon	252	71.56	881
37	Shend	1,554	77.21	960
38	Shirur Anantpal	10,417	77.78	962
39	Shivpur	2,282	73.61	974
40	Sumthana	1,045	78.06	935
41	Talegaon	1,525	72.82	909
42	Talegaon Bori	2,000	72.45	1,010
43	Thergaon	2,285	74.26	911
44	Tipral	912	77.83	983
45	Turukwadi	701	72.55	942
46	Umardara	1,313	67.93	928
47	Wanjarkheda	1,222	78.05	961
48	Yerol	4,581	73.3	943

== Udgir Taluka ==
sr.no.	Town/village name	Population	Literacy(%)	Sex ratio
1	Adolwadi	300	84.67	1,041
2	Anapwadi	555	78.51	961
3	Arasnal	1,306	79.9	932
4	Avalkonda	2,909	68.97	950
5	Bamni	1,261	81.55	980
6	Banshelki	2,230	83.2	898
7	Belshakarga	1,604	79.15	963
8	Bhakaskheda	2,268	76.56	965
9	Borgaon Bk.	1,369	71.88	953
10	Bortal Tanda	1,032	76.97	817
11	Boyachiwadi	556	65.32	979
12	Chandegaon	1,545	76.97	868
13	Chighali	969	68.24	986
14	Chimachiwadi	636	82.51	927
15	Chondi	1,521	66.08	938
16	Dangewadi	711	71.76	943
17	Daul	1,032	73.7	894
18	Dawangaon	2,720	75.97	922
19	Deulwadi	2,306	73.3	954
20	Dewarjan	4,329	73.7	924
21	Dhadaknal	640	70.96	934
22	Dhondi Hipparga	2,166	73.97	966
23	Dhotarwadi	859	73.07	900
24	Digras	2,366	74.66	908
25	Dongarshelki	2,929	83.41	918
26	Ekurka Road	1,774	81.47	875
27	Gangapur	1,002	72.2	1,032
28	Gudsur	5,359	72.83	951
29	Gurdhal	700	66.5	934
30	Haibatpur	1,448	86.96	941
31	Haknakwadi	1,620	74.22	877
32	Halli	6,003	75.61	894
33	Handarguli	6,707	74.85	990
34	Hangarga Kudar	1,560	73.65	1,055
35	Hanmantwadi	685	70.88	887
36	Her	5,856	76.66	955
37	Hipparga	869	79.58	979
38	Honihipparga	881	76.27	980
39	Ismalpur	984	77.23	992
40	Jaknal	657	82.61	893
41	Janapur	2,669	74.29	622
42	Kallur	1,668	77.14	940
43	Karadkhed	3,584	71.81	917
44	Karkheli	1,311	73.04	992
45	Karwandi	1,089	84.28	894
46	Kashiram / Somlatanda	483	62.92	963
47	Kasral	1,250	72.1	981
48	Kaulkhed	1,586	72.23	946
49	Kherda Kh.	1,282	76.65	988
50	Kiniyalladevi	2,659	77.65	947
51	Kodali	1,372	70.68	963
52	Kshetrafal	963	73.97	969
53	Kumdal	902	75.36	919
54	Kumdhal	635	84.84	901
55	Kumtha Kh.	3,448	78.64	959
56	Limbgaon	808	67.47	976
57	Lohara	6,442	71.78	957
58	Loni	3,826	78.95	910
59	Madlapur	2,617	87.39	983
60	Mahadevwadi	576	79.2	1,141
61	Malewadi	1,380	81.19	935
62	Malkapur	5,512	83.82	935
63	Mallapur	1,001	69.05	857
64	Manjari	942	80.66	996
65	Maroti Tanda	174	65.28	1,260
66	Mogha	2,289	76.95	948
67	Mortalwadi	1,428	78.82	686
68	Mortalwadi	1,433	77.14	990
69	Mutalgaon	313	72.69	1,032
70	Nagalgaon	3,211	74.37	912
71	Nalgir	4,808	77.21	953
72	Nawandi	2,958	78.74	746
73	Netragaon	1,252	79.98	886
74	Nideban	8,249	86.12	899
75	Pimpri	1,816	75.81	1,013
76	Rawangaon	3,000	77.6	978
77	Rudrawadi	607	80.99	885
78	Satala Bk	1,764	77.41	982
79	Shambhu Umarga	1,867	80.15	945
80	Shekapur	2,215	81.07	901
81	Shelhal	2,473	76.54	949
82	Shirol	2,915	71.77	1,023
83	Somnathpur	5,506	80.93	888
84	Sukani	1,672	78.19	976
85	Sumthana	628	74.73	1,000
86	Tadlapur	1,037	83.44	872
87	Takali	1,459	70.35	1,010
88	Tiwatgyal	629	97.38	1,023
89	Togari	3,178	73.28	976
90	Tondar	5,362	73.86	899
91	Tondchir	2,828	77.18	878
92	Udgir	1,03,550	84.25	917
93	Umarga Manna	924	78.33	901
94	Wadhawana Bk.	8,643	77.06	947
95	Wadhawana Kh.	3,140	74.71	947
96	Wagdari	1,130	65.97	877
97	Waigaon	2,293	80.22	895
98	Wanjarwadi	317	75.18	843
99	Yenki	1,769	76.54	950
