= Abhimanyu Dattatray Pawar =

Indian politician

Member of the Maharashtra Legislative Assembly
- Incumbent
- Assumed office 27 November 2019
- Preceded by: Basavraj Patil
- Constituency: Ausa

Personal details
- Born: 1 July 1971 (age 54) Kasar Shirshi, Nilanga, Latur, Maharashtra
- Citizenship: India
- Party: Bharatiya Janata Party (BJP)
- Parent: Dattatrey Pawar (father)
- Education: Bachelor of commerce, Master of Personnel Management
- Alma mater: Dayanand commerce college Latur, Indian institute of management studies & research Pune
- Occupation: Politician
- Website: www.abhimanyupawar.in

Abhimanyu Dattatray Pawar is an Indian politician from Bharatiya Janata Party. He is a member of the 14th Maharashtra Legislative Assembly. He completed his Graduation degree in B.com. from Dayanand Commerce College, Latur. A post graduate degree in master of personal management from Savitribai Phule Pune University. He was Personal Assistant to Chief minister of Maharashtra Devendra Fadnavis, in office from 2014 to 2019 being one of leading officers on special duty (OSD), the personal assistant (PA) and a leading and well-known member of the Bhartiya Janata Yuva Morcha (BJYM) from Latur district.

== Early life ==
He was born on 1 July 1971. His parents did around 15 years full-time work in Vanavasi Kalyan Ashram, and also RSS pracharak. He got rambhau mahalangdi prabodhini Award in 2010. He joined RSS from their childhood.

== Positions held ==
- 2014: Personal Assistant to Chief Minister of Maharashtra.
- 2019: Elected to Maharashtra Legislative Assembly
- 2024:Elected to Maharashtra legislative Assembly (Second time)

== Social activities ==
He along with his team and Latur District Administration successfully organized first ever Maha Atal Arogya Shibir in Latur. More than 250 with expertise of medical sector treated thousands of people at zero cost. Issue of land for Latur District Govt. Hospital was long pending.

He has provided financial assistance of the billions of rupees from the Chief minister Assistance Fund to thousands of needy people in Latur district.
