= Ausa =

Ausa or AUSA may refer to:

== Places ==
- Ausa (town), a town in Maharashtra, India
  - Ausa (Vidhan Sabha constituency)
- Ausa (river), in San Marino and Italy
- Ausa (Udine), a river in Italy
- Ausa, Hispania, Roman name for Vic, a town near Barcelona, Catalonia, Spain

== Organisations ==
- Aberdeen University Students' Association, Scotland
- Adelaide University Sports Association, Australia
- Argentina Urbana SA, a highway consortium during the government of Buenos Aires mayor Osvaldo Cacciatore
- Army of the United States, the version of the US Army with conscription
- Association of the United States Army, a non-profit, the professional association of the United States Army
- Auckland University Students' Association, New Zealand

== Other uses ==
- Anime USA, an annual anime convention located in Washington, D.C.
- Assistant United States Attorney
- A.U.S.A., a 2003 NBC television series

== See also ==
- Aussa (disambiguation)
