= Aurad Shahajani =

Town in Nilanga Taluka, Latur, Maharashtra, India

- Town
- Nickname: Aurad
- Location in Maharashtra, India Aurad Shahajani (India)
- Coordinates: 18°05′45″N 076°53′17″E
- Country: India
- State: Maharashtra
- District: Latur
- Taluka: Nilanga

Government
  - Body: Grampanchayat

Population (2001)
  - Total: 20,154
- Demonym: Auradkar

Languages
  - Official: Marathi
- Time zone: UTC+5:30 (IST)
- ISO 3166 code: IN-MH
- Vehicle registration: MH 24
- Lok Sabha constituency: Latur
- Vidhan Sabha constituency: Nilanga
- Website: maharashtra.gov.in

Aurad Shahajani is a town in the Nilanga taluka of Latur district, Maharashtra. Situated on the banks of the Terna River, it lies near the state border with Karnataka. As the largest village in the Nilanga taluka, Aurad Shahajani serves as a central hub for the surrounding rural communities. Because of this regional dependence, there have been local demands to elevate the town to the status of an independent taluka. The town is located 20 kilometers from Nilanga and 68 kilometers from Bidar, Karnataka. The nearest railhead is Bhalki Railway Station, approximately 37 kilometers away.

Religions in Aurad Shahajani
Religion	Percent
Hindus	74%
Buddhists	9%
Muslims	16%
Christians	0.2%
Jains	0.2%
Others†	0.4%
Distribution of religions †Includes OBC, VJNT (<0.2%).

== Languages ==
Marathi is widely spoken in the region. Hindi, Urdu, Kannada, and Telugu are also common in the village.

== Location ==
Aurad Shahajani is located on the banks of Terna River in central west India. It is closer (approximately 220 kilometres (140 mi)) to Hyderabad in the state of Telangana than it is to the capital of Maharashtra state, Mumbai.

== Geography and climate ==
Aurad Shahajani

Climate chart (precipitation, max. and min. temperature)
J	F	M	A	M	J	J	A	S	O	N	D
2.8 29 12	2.1 32 14	3.3 36 19	3.5 38 22	24 38 25	114 34 24	116 30 22	120 29 21	122 30 21	61 32 19	11 30 15	6.5 28 12
- █ Average max. and min. temperatures in °C
- █ Precipitation totals in mm
- Source: Shahajani,+IND+forecast:averagesm&setunit=C MSN Weather
Imperial conversion
J	F	M	A	M	J	J	A	S	O	N	D
0.1 84 54	0.1 90 57	0.1 97 66	0.1 100 72	1 100 77	4.5 93 75	4.6 86 72	4.7 84 70	4.8 86 70	2.4 90 66	0.4 86 59	0.3 82 54
- █ Average max. and min. temperatures in °F
- █ Precipitation totals in inches

Aurad Shahajani is situated 636 metres above mean sea level, on the Balaghat plateau, near the Maharashtra–Karnataka state boundary. It receives its drinking water from the nearby Terna River, Terna joins to Manjra river here at this village and then named Wanjara by the name of Wanjarkheda (a village at the other bank of river in Karnatka state) which suffered from environmental degradation and silting in the late 20th and early 21st centuries. Master Deenanath Mangeshkar Mahavidyalaya and some other villagers tried successfully to wide shape of river.

Temperature: Annual temperatures in range from 13 to 41 °C (55 to 106 °F), with the most comfortable time to visit in the winter; Aurad Shahajani is October to February. The highest temperature ever recorded was 45.6 °C (114.1 °F). The lowest recorded temperature was 2.2 °C (36.0 °F). In the cold season the district is sometimes affected by cold waves in association with the eastward passage of western disturbances across north India, when the minimum temperature may drop down to about 2 to 4 °C (36 to 39 °F).

Rainfall: Most of the rainfall occurs in the monsoon season from June to September. Rainfall varies from 9.0 to 693 mm/month. Average annual rainfall is 725 mm.

== Culture ==
There is a temple dedicated to the Hindu goddess Bhavani that is associated with Chhatrapati Shivaji Maharaj jayanti.

== Media and communication ==
Newspapers

In Aurad Shahajani, the most widely read Marathi newspapers are:

1. Lokmat
2. Loksatta
3. Sakal
4. Ekmat
5. Punyanagri

Additionally, some residents read English newspapers such as:

1. Times of India
2. The Hindu

Other Marathi daily newspapers available include:

1. Lokman
2. Marathwada Neta
3. Rajdharma
4. Sanchar
5. Sarathi Samachar
6. Tarun Bharat
7. Yashwant

== Demographics ==
In the 2001 Indian census, the suburb of Aurad shahajani recorded inhabitants, males (51.4%) and females (48.6%), for a gender ratio of 945 females per 1000 males.
