= Usturi =

Village in Maharashtra

- town
- Nickname: Usturgi
- Location in Maharashtra, India Usturi (India)
- Coordinates: 17°59′05″N 76°47′42″E
- Country: India
- State: Maharashtra
- District: Latur
- Gram panchayat: Usturi
- Taluka: Nilanga

Languages
  - Official: Marathi
- Time zone: UTC+5:30 (IST)
- Vidhan Sabha constituency: Ausa

Usturi is a village with a Gram panchayat in Latur District in the Indian state of Maharashtra.

== Demographics ==
It is located 60 km to the south of District headquarters Latur. 18 km from Nilanga. 504 km from State capital Mumbai

Usturi Pin code is 413607.

Harijawalga (5 km), Hasori (bk) (5 km), Aundha (5 km), Chandori (6 km), Shiradhon (6 km) are the nearby villages to Usturi. Usturi is surrounded by Basavakalyan to the east, Umerga to the west.

Nilanga, Umarga, Latur are the nearby cities to Usturi.

== Languages ==
Kannada and Marathi are widely spoken in the village. The village is predominanted by Lingayats community.

== Historic places ==
Usturi is famous for the Korneshwar virakth matha (Place of Lingayatism)and Nagnatheshwar Mandir (Historic Shivmandir/Hemadpanthi)

== Educational Institute ==
Only one primary school - Zilla Parishad prathmik Vidya Mandir, Usturi (from Standard 1st to 7th)

Secondary School -Dyaneshwar vidhyalay, Usturi/ Harijawalaga (from standard 8th to 10th ) kept between Usturi & Harijawalaga

== Hospitals ==
Sub Division of Zilla Rugnalaya.
