= Halgara =

Village in Maharashtra

Halgara हलगरा
- village
- Nickname: Halgara
- Location in Maharashtra, India Halgara (India)
- Coordinates: 18°05′45″N 076°53′17″E
- Country: India
- State: Maharashtra
- District: Latur
- Taluka: Nilanga

Government
  - Body: Village panchayat

Population (2011)
  - Total: 12,000

Languages
  - Official: Marathi
- Time zone: UTC+5:30 (IST)
- Postal code: 413522
- ISO 3166 code: IN-MH
- Vehicle registration: MH
- Lok Sabha constituency: Latur
- Vidhan Sabha constituency: Nilanga
- Website: maharashtra.gov.in

Halgara is a panchayat village in the state of Maharashtra, India. Administratively, Halgara is under Nilanga Taluka of Latur District in Maharashtra. The village of Halgara is 15 km (9.3 mi) by road east of the town of Nilanga, 5 km (3.1 mi) by south of town of Aurad Shahajani.

There are two villages in the Halgara gram panchayat: Halgara and Rajewadi.

== Demographics ==
In the 2001 census, the village of Halgara had 5,844 inhabitants. There are two Buddhist temples in Halgara where people go for prayer every day.
