= Sahakar Maharshi Shivajirao Nade =

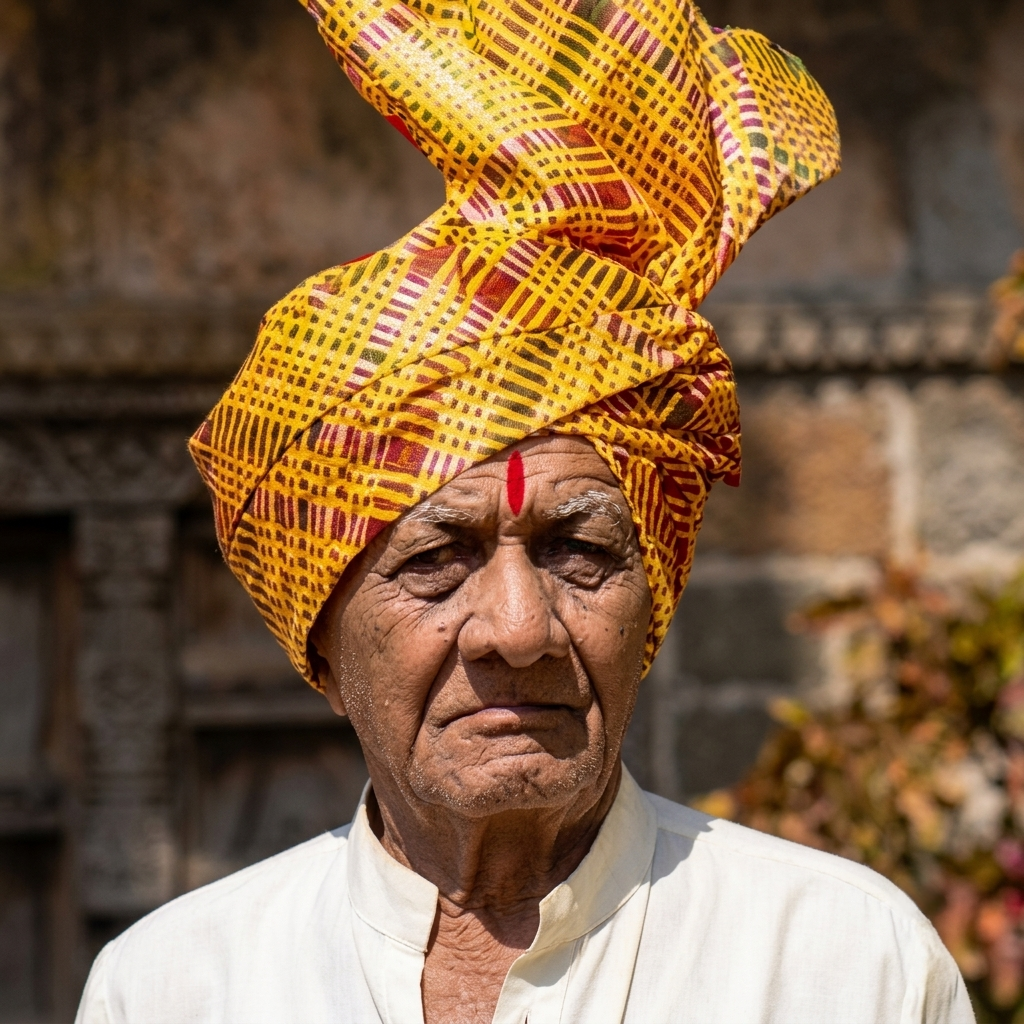
- Sahakar Maharshi Shivajirao Nade
- Born: Shivajirao Tukaram Nade; 26 February 1926; Murud, Latur , Maharashtra, India
- Died: 21 June 2021 (aged 95); Murud, Latur
- Other name: Kakasaheb
- Occupations: Social Worker; Freedom Fighter; Cooperative Leader
- Known for: Freedom movement and contribution to the cooperative sector in Latur
- Title: Founder / Director, [Rural Education Socity]

Sahakar Maharshi Shivajirao Nade was a prominent social worker, freedom fighter, and cooperative leader from the Murud region in Latur district, Maharashtra. Shivajirao Nade was a senior leader of the older generation. Latur his work as the president of Osmanabad (Dharashiv) District Central Cooperative Bank was people-oriented. He also worked as the vice president of Osmanabad Zilla Parishad. He also held the post of Vice President of Terna Cooperative Sugar Factory in Dhoki. He was the ex-officio President of Rural Education Society's Janata Vidhya Mandir School In Murud. Murud Gram Panchayat was unopposed under his leadership. He had served as Sarpanch for 38 years.

== Rural development ==
After Independence, He started rural development in the Murud Area under the leadership of the then MP of Beed, Late Babasaheb Paranjpe. Many rural development schemes were implemented under his leadership. He started industries like Weaving, Handicrafts and thread weaving from the Khadi industry.

== Involvement with education trusts ==
After Independence, educational facilities in the rural areas of Marathwada were extremely limited. Children in rural areas-especially boys and girls from farming families-emained deprived of education. In 1952, He established the Rural Education Society and provided education facilities in rural areas like Murud. The main objective of this organization was to provide accessible, high-quality, and affordable education to the common people in rural areas. He took the initiative to estavlish a Panchayat Raj Training Centre and democratic processes to representatives and employees of local self- government bodies.

== Awards and honors ==
SShivajirao Nade was honored with numerous national and state-level awards for his remarkable work:

Year	Award	Conferred by / Presented by
1971	'Sahakar Maharshi' Title	Government of Maharashtra
1974	Bharat Sarathi Award	Central Government
1975	Tamrapatra Desh Seva Sanman Award	Presented by the president of India (New Delhi)
2003	Vriksha Mitra Award	Forest Department
2012	Sahakar Ratna Award	Government of Maharashtra
2013	Jeevan Gaurav Award	Latur Zilla Parishad
