= Sakol =

Village in Maharashtra, India

Sakol साकोळ Sakhol
- village
- Location in Maharashtra, India Sakol (India)
- Coordinates: 18°16′57″N 76°53′04″E
- Country: India
- State: Maharashtra
- District: Latur
- Taluka: Shirur-Anantpal

Government
  - Type: Panchayati raj (India)
  - Body: Gram panchayat

Languages
  - Official: Marathi
- Time zone: UTC+5:30 (IST)
- ISO 3166 code: IN-MH
- Vehicle registration: MH
- Lok Sabha constituency: Latur
- Vidhan Sabha constituency: Nilanga
- Website: maharashtra.gov.in

Sakol is a panchayat village in Shirur Anantpal Taluka in Latur subdivision of Latur district in the Indian state of Maharashtra. The village of Sakol is 12 km by road southeast of the village of Shirur Anantpal and 40 km by road northeast of the town of Nilanga.

The village of Sakol is the only village in the gram panchayat.

== Demographics ==
In the 2001 Indian census, the village of Sakol recorded 7,018 inhabitants, of which 3,608 were males (51.4%) and 3,410 were females (48.6%), for a gender ratio of 945 females per 1,000 males.
