= Tawarja Dam =

- Location within Maharashtra
- Official name: Tawarja Dam D01370
- Location: Latur
- Coordinates: 18.309388°N 76.469650°E
- Opening date: 1982
- Owners: Government of Maharashtra, India

Dam and spillways
- Type of dam: Earthfill
- Impounds: Tawarja river
- Height: 14.3 m (47 ft)
- Length: 2,222 m (7,290 ft)
- Dam volume: 361 km^{3} (87 cu mi)

Reservoir
- Total capacity: 16,950 km^{3} (4,070 cu mi)
- Surface area: 741 km^{2} (286 sq mi)

Tawarja Dam, is an earthfill dam on Tawarja river near Ausa, Latur district in the state of Maharashtra in India.

== Specifications ==
The height of the dam above its lowest foundation is 14.3 m (47 ft) while the length is 2,222 m (7,290 ft). The volume content is 361 km^{3} (87 cu mi) and gross storage capacity is 20,520.00 km^{3} (4,923.01 cu mi).

== Purpose ==
- Irrigation

== See also ==
- Dams in Maharashtra
- List of reservoirs and dams in India
