= Jalkot Taluka =

Jalkot Taluka is a taluka, administrative subdivision, of Latur District in Maharashtra, India. The administrative center for the taluka is the village of Jalkot. In the 2011 census there were forty-three panchayat villages in Jalkot Taluka.

== Geography ==
Jalkot Taluka is in the Balaghat Range.
