= Keshavrao Sonawane =

Indian politician

Keshavrao Sitaram Sonawane
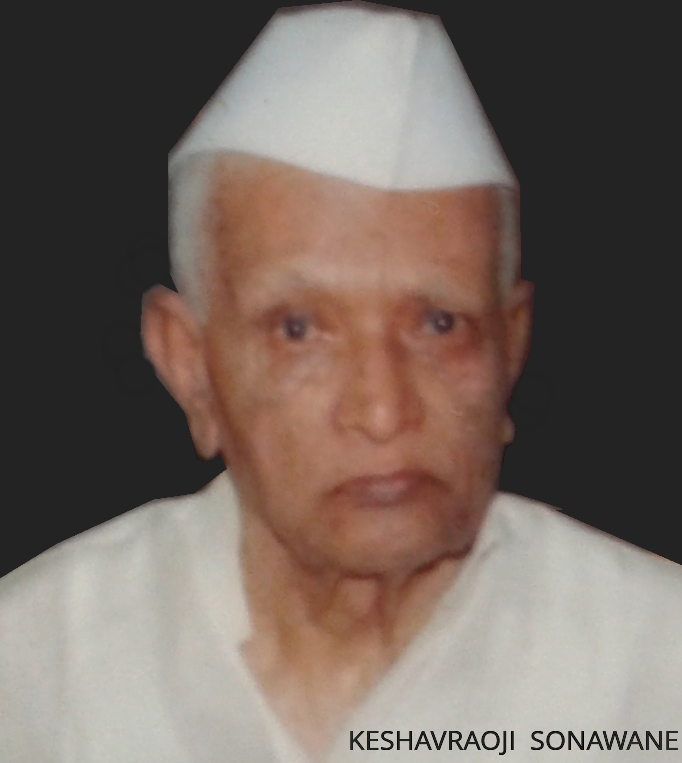

Co-operative Minister Government of Maharashtra
- In office 1962–1967
- Preceded by: Balasaheb Bharde

Member of the Maharashtra Legislative Assembly for Latur
- In office 1957–1962
- In office 1962–1967
- Succeeded by: V.R. Kaldate

Member of the Maharashtra Legislative Assembly for Ausa
- In office 1972–1977
- In office 1978–1980
- Preceded by: V. S. Musande
- Succeeded by: Shivshankar Vishwanath Utage

Personal details
- Born: 4 February 1925 Mogarga, Ausa, Latur, Hyderabad State, British India
- Died: 8 November 2006 (aged 81) Latur, Maharashtra, India
- Citizenship: India
- Party: Indian National Congress
- Spouse: Kadubai Sonavane
- Children: 7
- Parent: Sitaram Sonawane
- Education: B.A. L.L.B.
- Alma mater: Osmania university
- Occupation: Politician; Lawyer

Keshavrao Sonawane (1925–2006) was an Indian politician, who served four terms in the Maharashtra Legislative Assembly, and was a Co-operative minister in Yashwantrao Chavan ministry and Vasantrao Naik ministry during 1962–1967. He was elected as MLA for 4 times, twice from Latur City Assembly constituency and twice from Ausa Assembly constituency.

== Early life ==
Keshavrao Sonavane was born in Mogarga of Ausa Taluka in the farmer's family. Keshavrao Sonavane's father Sitaram Sonawane was a farmer who was follower of the Arya Samaj. According to the Arya Samaj all children should be well educated. Inspired by the teachings of Arya Samaj Keshavrao's Father Sitaram Sonavane decided to relocate his family to Latur for education of his children. Keshavrao got his primary education from Government High School Latur. After completing his primary education he moved to Hyderabad for pursuing Bachelor of Laws (LLB). Keshavrao Sonawane, got his LLB from Osmania University, Hyderabad. After getting his LLB, he started his practice in the Latur district court. He was a criminal defence lawyer in Latur.

== Political career ==
Yashwantrao Chavan selected Keshavrao as an Indian National Congress candidate for the position of Bombay Legislative Assembly Member from Latur Constituency. In 1957, Keshavrao ran for Bombay Legislative Assembly election from Latur Constituency and won the Bombay Legislative Assembly election by defeating Vithalrao Kelgaokar. Subsequently, he won the assembly election in 1962 from Latur Constituency by defeating Ramchandra Govind and became the Co-operative Minister for Maharashtra state.

During his absence in Latur city while he was serving as a co-operative minister, opposition got stronger in the latur. because of this he had lost the assembly election from Latur Constituency in 1967 against socialist leader Bapu Kaldate.

Despite this huge setback, in 1972 he decided to stand for Maharashtra Legislative Assembly election from Ausa Constituency where he had very strong support in the form of his network of family members and relatives. At the same time as a chief member of Maharashtra Pradesh Congress Committee he nominated Shivaraj Patil as his successor for the Latur Constituency seat after deciding to run for election from Ausa Constituency. This time he won the election against Madhav Patil and became the Member of Maharashtra Legislative Assembly from Ausa Constituency. Kashinath Jadhav of former Janata Dal had lost by the margin of three thousand votes to Keshavraoji Sonavane in 1977 assembly elections.

== Elections contested ==
Year	Constituency	Party	Result	Vote Count	Opposition Candidate / Runner up	Opposition Party	Opposition vote Count
1957	Latur	INC	Won	14785	Vithalrao Kelgaokar	IND	12178
1962	Latur	INC	Won	23049	Ramchandra Govind	IND	14036
1967	Latur	INC	Lost	24470	V. R. Kaldate	SSP	28948
1972	Ausa	INC	Won	44153	Dinkarrao Fatepurkar	CPI	14216
1978	Ausa	INC	Won	19321	Patil Madhavrao Santaram	IND	18393

== Notable works ==
=== Dalda Factory ===
Dalda Factory was Asia's first oil mill set up on cooperative terms. Keshavrao was very actively involved in the establishment of Dalda Factory in Latur District. Dalda was major produce of the Latur region, for Dalda British Government had laid railway lines to Latur.

=== Maharashtra Agricultural Produce Marketing (Development & Regulation) Act, 1963 ===
As a Co-operative minister of Maharashtra Keshavrao Sonawane created the draft of this Agricultural Produce Marketing Committee (APMC) act for the welfare of farmers in Maharashtra. Before passing this law, every market committee was having its own rules, this law made all market committees in Maharashtra to have single central administrative law under state control. Agricultural produce market committee (APMC) is a marketing board established by a state government in India. APMC ensures that farmers are not exploited by any intermediaries like Dalals/Traders/commission agents who compel farmers to sell their produce at the farm gate for an extremely low price. This APMC act mandates that all food produce should first be brought to a market yard and then sold through auction.

=== Dayanand Education Society ===
Dayanand Education society was established in May 1961. Earlier Latur was small town in the Osmanabad District. Facilities for higher education were not available in the Latur so students were left with no option but going to cities like Hyderabad, Pune, and Mumbai and so on.

Student from middle class and lower-middle-class families were not able to afford the costs of education and other costs arising from the needs to live in the cities like Mumbai, Pune etc. Higher education was rather like a dream for students from poor families. So to make the higher education facilities accessible to children of farmers, agricultural laborers, workers; the dignitaries and business people like Manikrao Sonavane (elder brother of Keshavrao Sonawane), Chandrashekhar Bajpai, Ramgopalji Rathi and Keshavraoji Sonawane established Dayanand Education Society in May 1961.

Manikraoji Sonavane, elder brother of Keshavrao and chairman of market committee, convinced the farmers of Latur to contribute to this cause. Shri Keshavraoji Sonavane, Co-Operative Minister of the Maharashtra state, contributed to this cause by completing all required formal government procedures.

=== Terna Sugar Factory ===
This is the first co-operative sugar factory in Osmanabad and Latur District. Formerly Latur was in Osmanabad District. Keshavraoji Sonavane brought this Sugar factory for Osmanabad and Latur District's farmers. It was beginning of the co-operative movement in the sugar industry started by keshavraoji Sonavane. Terna sugar factory was registered in 1965 with production capacity of 1250 Tons of Cane per Day. Currently terna has 3500 Tons of Cane per Day capacity.factory covers area of 3 talukas i.e. Osmanabad, Kallamb and Latur. This factory covers nearly 171 villages by area of operation.

=== Latur District Central Cooperative Bank Ltd. Latur ===
Keshavraoji Sonavane was instrumental in the setup of Latur District Central Cooperative Bank. Latur DCC bank was developed during Keshavraoji's tenure in the government as Co-operative minister. Co-operative bank forms an integral part of banking system in India. As this bank operates mainly for the benefit of rural area, particularly the agricultural sector and Cooperative Banks in general and District Central Cooperative Banks in particular have to play major role in the upliftment of Economy. By creating Latur DCC bank Keshavrao made a very positive impact on agricultural sector and especially on the farmers of Latur and Osmanabad District.

=== District Bar Association, Latur ===
Keshavrao Sonavane was a life member of District Bar Association, Latur. Vilasrao Deshmukh and Shivraj Patil were also life members of District Bar Association, Latur. Keshavrao Sonawane was President of Latur Bar Association for year 1960.

== In literature ==
He was mentioned in books Uchalya (The Branded) by Laxman Gaikwad (1987), Yeravaḍā vidyāpīṭhātīla divasa by Kumāra Saptarshī and Māndiyāḷī by Ananta Bhālerāva (1994). Uchalya novel is an autobiographical account of the life of a stereotyped underdog but of a representative of a section of society thriving on petty crimes.
