= Masalga Dam =

- Location within Maharashtra
- Official name: Masalga Dam D02930
- Location: Nilanga
- Coordinates: 18.2430055°N 76.7168856°E
- Opening date: 1996
- Owners: Government of Maharashtra, India

Dam and spillways
- Type of dam: Earthfill
- Impounds: local river
- Height: 10.26 m (33.7 ft)
- Length: 2,023 m (6,637 ft)
- Dam volume: 0 km^{3} (0 cu mi)

Reservoir
- Total capacity: 0 km^{3} (0 cu mi)
- Surface area: 3,696 km^{2} (1,427 sq mi)

Masalga Dam, is an earthfill dam on local river near Nilanga, Latur district in the state of Maharashtra in India.

== Specifications ==
The height of the dam above lowest foundation is 10.26 m (33.7 ft) while the length is 2,023 m (6,637 ft). The volume content is 0 km^{3} (0 cu mi) and gross storage capacity is 14,670.00 km^{3} (3,519.52 cu mi).

== Purpose ==
- Irrigation

== See also ==
- Dams in Maharashtra
- List of reservoirs and dams in India
