= Bhutmugli =

Village in Maharashtra

Bhutmugli is a village in Nilanga taluka of Latur district in the state of Maharashtra, India.

The population of Bhutmugli is about 8000, according to the last census. About 60% are male.

== Culture ==
Hinduism is the most commonly practiced religion in Bhutmugli. The most prominent and ancient Hindu temples in Bhutmugli are The Mahadev's temple and Hanumana's Temple and Ambamata's temple located at the middle of the village. The mahadev baras, harinam saptah festival is the biggest attraction of Bhutmugli city. The oldest and only SADASHIV Hemadpanti temple is one of the oldest temples in India.

== Education ==
Schools in Bhutmugli are Zilha Parishad primary school and Maharshi Dayanand Vidyalaya.

== Climate ==
Bhutmugli has a tropical wet and dry seasons with average temperatures ranging between 20 °C to 42 °C. The rain comes during June to November. Winter season is November to February, and summer is March to May. The climate is similar to Marathwada region.
