= Terna River =

River in India

Coordinates: 18°03′47″N 76°57′04″E

Location
- Country: India
- Region: Dharashiv district of Maharashtra & flowing through Ausa & Nilanga talukas in Latur District of Maharashtra

Basin features
- Landmarks: Upper Terna Dam, Makni Dam

Terna River is a tributary of the Manjira River, which in turn is a tributary of the Godavari River, flowing through the Dharashiv district in Maharashtra. It flows through the Ausa and Nilanga Talukas in the Latur District.

Terna River originated in Terkheda Ta Washi, Osmanabad. The river is the main source for irrigational purposes for Osmanabad, also known as Dharashiv. The Upper Terna Dam and Makni Dam are erected on this river.
