= Latur Telgaon =

Village in Maharashtra, India

Latur Telgaon (Old Name - Telgaon)
- town
- Location in Maharashtra, India Latur Telgaon (India)
- Coordinates: 18.603219°N 76.929206°E
- Country: India
- State: Maharashtra
- District: Latur

Population
  - Total: 1,650
  - Density: 291/km^{2} (750/sq mi)

Languages
  - Official: Marathi
- Time zone: UTC+5:30 (IST)
- PIN: 413513
- Telephone code: 02381
- Vehicle registration: MH-24
- Nearest city: Latur
- Sex ratio: 1000:935 ♂/♀
- Literacy: 76%
- Lok Sabha constituency: Latur
- Vidhan Sabha constituency: Ahmedpur
- Climate: Semi arid (Köppen)

Telgaon is a small village in Ahmedpur subdivision of Latur district in the Indian state of Maharashtra.

Telgaon, Dist: Latur, Maharashtra Population Approx. 1500–2000. This town is located on the Maharashtra State highway no. 3 (Kolhapur-Nagpur Highway). It is a small town where majority of population's occupation is farming and milk production. It has a dam, The crops taken in the tehsil are jowar, red gram, soybean, sugarcane, etc. Many farmers have started getting income out of fruits like Mangoes.
