= Chakur Taluka =

Administrative subdivision of the Latur district

Chakur Taluka is a taluka, administrative subdivision, of Latur District in Maharashtra, India. The administrative center for the taluka is the village of Chakur. In the 2011 census there were seventy-two panchayat villages in Chakur Taluka.
