= Dayanand College =

Dayanand College may refer to the following colleges in India:

- Dayanand College, Ajmer in Rajasthan
- Dayanand College, Hisar in Haryana
- Dayanand College Latur in Maharashtra

== See also ==
- Dayanand College of Law, Kanpur
