= Terna Dam =

- Location within Maharashtra
- Official name: Terna Dam D01221
- Location: Osmanabad
- Coordinates: 18.329265°N 76.1203623°E
- Opening date: 1970
- Owners: Government of Maharashtra, India

Dam and spillways
- Type of dam: Earthfill
- Impounds: Terna river
- Height: 15 m (49 ft)
- Length: 2,651 m (8,698 ft)
- Dam volume: 186 km^{3} (45 cu mi)

Reservoir
- Total capacity: 18,630 km^{3} (4,470 cu mi)
- Surface area: 380 km^{2} (150 sq mi)

Terna Dam is an earthfill dam on Terna river near Osmanabad in the state of Maharashtra in India.

== Specifications ==
The height of the dam above its lowest foundation is 15 m (49 ft) while the length is 2,651 m (8,698 ft). The volume content is 186 km^{3} (45 cu mi) and gross storage capacity is 22,910.00 km^{3} (5,496.40 cu mi).

== Purpose ==
The main purpose of the dam is to supply water for irrigation and domestic purpose to nearby villages. Earlier, it supplied water to Osmanabad city.

== See also ==
- Dams in Maharashtra
- List of reservoirs and dams in India
