= National Highway 361H (India) =

National highway in India

National Highway 361H
- Map of National Highway 361H in red

Route information
- Auxiliary route of NH 61
- Length: 58 km (36 mi)

Major junctions
- North end: Parali Vaijnath
- South end: Renapur

Location
- Country: India
- States: Maharashtra

Highway system
- Roads in India; Expressways; National; State; Asian

National Highway 361H, commonly referred to as NH 361H is a national highway in India. It is a spur road of National Highway 61. NH-361H traverses the state of Maharashtra in India.

== Route ==
Parali, Dharmapuri, Pangaon, Renapur.

== Junctions ==
NH 361F Terminal near Parli.
NH 548D near Dharmapuri.
NH 548B Terminal near Renapur.

== See also ==
- List of national highways in India
- List of national highways in India by state
