= Gharni Dam =

- Location within Maharashtra
- Official name: Gharni Dam D01231
- Location: Sirur
- Coordinates: 18.3803258°N 76.8264913°E
- Opening date: 1969
- Owners: Government of Maharashtra, India

Dam and spillways
- Type of dam: Earthfill
- Impounds: Gharni river
- Height: 15.24 m (50.0 ft)
- Length: 956 m (3,136 ft)

Reservoir
- Total capacity: 22,460 km^{3} (5,390 cu mi)

Gharni Dam, is an earthfill dam on Gharni river near Sirur, Latur district in the state of Maharashtra in India.

== Specifications ==
The height of the dam above lowest foundation is 15.24 m (50.0 ft) while the length is 956 m (3,136 ft). The gross storage capacity is 25,080.00 km^{3} (6,017.01 cu mi).

== Purpose ==
- Irrigation

== See also ==
- Dams in Maharashtra
- List of reservoirs and dams in India
