= Bhada =

Village in Maharashtra, India

- Town
- Location in Maharashtra, India Bhada (India)
- Coordinates: 18.25°N 76.5°E
- Country: India
- State: Maharashtra
- District: Latur
- Elevation: 634 m (2,080 ft)

Population (2011)
  - Total: 5,938

Languages
  - Official: Marathi
- Time zone: UTC+5:30 (IST)

Bhada is a village in Ausa Taluka, Latur district, Maharashtra, India. As of 2011, it has a population of 5,938. The main occupation of the people is agriculture although there are no big rivers in the village. The farming is mostly rain fed and very little is under irrigation.

Bhada is located 12 km away from Ausa and 30 km from the district centre Latur.

== Economy ==
Bhada was notable for cultivating guava fruits in earlier days. Nowadays some farmers cultivate banana, pomegranate, watermelon, muskmelon, grapes, and vegetables as a cash crops. Cotton (up to 100 ha), soybean, and tur are the major crop types of Bhada.

== Facilities ==
Facilities in Bhada include a police station, health center, ZP school, girls' school, and a veterinary hospital.

== Religion ==
Shri Hari-Har (Vitthal-Rakhumai and Mahadev) temple and Hanuman temple are situated in Bhada. Shri Sadgurunath Prabhakar Swami Maharaj Temple Bhada is located at bhada which is very famous in the nearby area. Many devotees visit the Prabhakar Maharaj Temple and a Gulal programme of Maharaj is celebrated every year. Shri khandoba devsthan is also very famous in nearby area, all the villagers every year celebrated as a "Khandobachi Jatra" which is very famous. A Muslim mosque is also situated in Bhada.

All villagers celebrate Urus of "Satpeers" every year. Several shrines (dargahas) are located in the village as well, namely "Gulabhawali and Latibshawali", "Saidraja", "Kalepeer", "Jindawali" and "Dawalmalik". These dargahas have been landmarks on all agriculture documents since ancient times.
