= Devargan Dam =

Devarjan Dam
- Location within Maharashtra
- Official name: Devarjan Dam D03631
- Location: Udgir
- Coordinates: 18.3332518°N 76.9948482°E
- Opening date: 1993
- Owners: Government of Maharashtra, India

Dam and spillways
- Type of dam: Earthfill
- Impounds: Devari river
- Height: 15.58 m (51.1 ft)
- Length: 1,715 m (5,627 ft)
- Dam volume: 0 km^{3} (0 cu mi)

Reservoir
- Total capacity: 10,670 km^{3} (2,560 cu mi)
- Surface area: 4,010 km^{2} (1,550 sq mi)

Devarjan Dam, is an earthfill dam on Devari river near Udgir, Latur district in state of Maharashtra in India.

== Specifications ==
The height of the dam above lowest foundation is 15.58 m (51.1 ft) while the length is 1,715 m (5,627 ft). The volume content is 0 km^{3} (0 cu mi) and gross storage capacity is 13,410.00 km^{3} (3,217.23 cu mi).

== Purpose ==
- Irrigation

== See also ==
- Dams in Maharashtra
- List of reservoirs and dams in India
