= Jalkot =

Village in Maharashtra, India

- town
- Location in Maharashtra, India
- Coordinates: 18°37′45″N 77°10′52″E
- Country: India
- State: Maharashtra
- District: latur
- Taluka: Jalkot

Government
  - Type: Nagar panchayat
  - Body: Jalkot Nagar panchayat
- Elevation: 646 m (2,119 ft)

Population (2001)
  - Total: 7,912

Language
  - Official: Marathi
- Time zone: UTC+5:30 (IST)
- PIN: 413532
- Telephone code: +02471
- Vehicle registration: MH24 / MH55
- Lok Sabha constituency: Latur
- Vidhan Sabha constituency: Udgir
- Literacy: 67%

Jalkot is a town and headquarters for Jalkot Taluka in Aurangabad Division of Nanded District in the Indian state of Maharashtra.

The place is famous for its Mahadeo Temple. This place is also famous for a large fort (60 ft.) of the Deshmukh family. The place is surrounded by 3 mountains of the Balaghat ranges. The government offices in the town are the telephone exchange, MSEB office, the police station, tehsil office (panchayat samiti), a good number of schools and colleges.

== History ==
During the 1947 "Hyderabad Police Action", there was a brief battle outside of Jalkot where a Hyderabad Army artillery field piece was captured. The town and around territories were ruled by local kings belonging to Deshmukh family.

== Demographics ==
In the 2001 Indian census, the village of Jalkot had 7,912 inhabitants, with 4,097 males (51.8%) and 3,815 females (48.2%), for a ratio of 931 females per 1,000 males.

== Education ==
Various schools are:

- Zilha parishad high school and kanya shala and other schools.
- junior college is Gurudatt Mahavidyalaya.
- There are 4 D-Ed colleges in city, these are mahatma phule adhyapak vidyalaya, Sambhajirao kendre adhyapak vidhyalaya and Engineering institute, Tirupati adhyapak vidhyalaya, and Sambhaji kendre adhyapak vidhyalaya.
- There is a CBSE school named Subhadrai English School.
- Other English Schools include M.P Model English School, The World School etc.

== Temples ==
- Balaji Temple is the new attraction of the town. Devotee's around the town are rushing to the place for God Tirupati darshan.
- Also Vitthal Rukmini Temple is nearby.
- Many other temples such as Lord Shiva Temple, Lord Datta Temple, Virbhadra Temple, Ambabai Temple and Hanuman Temple draw attention of people.
- A Temple of Mahadamai is located in a huge fort of Jalkot.
