= Kharosa =

Village in Maharashtra

Kharosa Caves
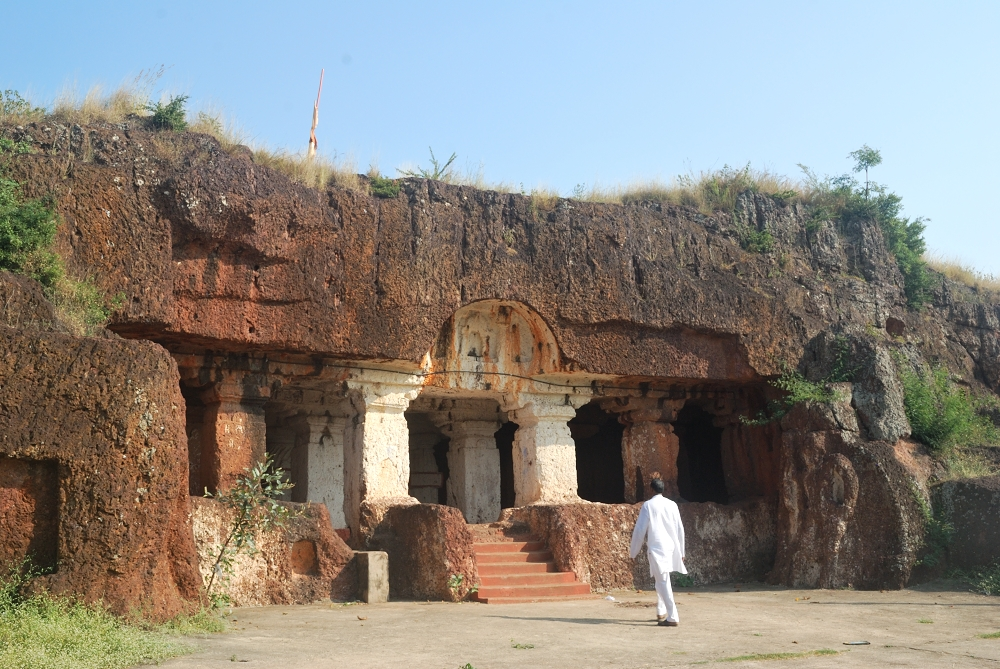
- Kharosa Caves
- Interactive map of Kharosa Caves
- Location: Kharosa, Latur, Maharashtra
- Coordinates: 18.157401°N 76.678280°E
- Elevation: 70 m (230 ft)
- Geology: Basalt
- Entrances: 12
- Difficulty: easy
- Translation: hindi (hindi)

Kharosa is a village situated at about 45 km from Latur City, in Latur district, Maharashtra, India. It is renowned for its caves, built around the 6th century. cave feature sculpture of a Jain Tirthankaras and Other attractions include the beautiful sculptures of Narasimha, Shiv Parvati, Kartikeya and Ravana. There are about 12 caves, of which one has a painted statue of seated Gautama Buddha. There are about a couple of dozen carved panels depicting mythological stories. In couple of caves, there are Shiv Lingas, a symbolic abstract representation of the Hindu deity Lord Shiva.

Nearby villages are Ramegaon, Shivani and the village of Kharosa. The upper side of the hill you will find Temple of Renuka Devi and a Mosque side by side, showing the unity of Hindus and Muslims in the area. Everyone who come to visit the temple also visit the Mosque. On the top side of the hill you will find source of water which is called as Seeta Nhani (Seeta's Bathroom) as they believe that Rama, Lakshmana and Seeta had once lived there. Villagers nearby are very co-operative and helpful.

== Route ==
The nearest major railway station is the Latur Railway Station, on the Latur-Miraj rail route. It is about 45 km from Latur on Latur-Nilanga Road via Ausa-Lamjana. Car can go up to the caves on the left flank and up to Devi Temple on right flank of a small hillock. Regular buses which connect Kharosa with Latur and Nilanga/Udgir.
