= Sakol Dam =

- Location within Maharashtra
- Official name: Sakol Dam D02924
- Location: Udgir
- Coordinates: 18.3070849°N 76.8941688°E
- Opening date: 1992
- Owners: Government of Maharashtra, India

Dam and spillways
- Type of dam: Earthfill
- Impounds: local river
- Height: 17.65 m (57.9 ft)
- Length: 1,425 m (4,675 ft)
- Dam volume: 371 km^{3} (89 cu mi)

Reservoir
- Total capacity: 10,950 km^{3} (2,630 cu mi)
- Surface area: 4,256 km^{2} (1,643 sq mi)

Sakol Dam, is an earthfill dam on local river near Udgir, Latur district in state of Maharashtra in India.

== Specifications ==
The height of the dam above lowest foundation is 17.65 m (57.9 ft) while the length is 1,425 m (4,675 ft). The volume content is 371 km^{3} (89 cu mi) and gross storage capacity is 12,689.00 km^{3} (3,044.25 cu mi).

== Purpose ==
- Irrigation

== See also ==
- Dams in Maharashtra
- List of reservoirs and dams in India
