= Almala =

Village in Maharashtra

Coordinates: 18.306143°N 76.4826696°E

- Interactive map of Almala
- Country: India
- State: Maharashtra
- Region: Marathwada
- Division: Aurangabad
- District: Latur

Government
  - Type: Grampanchayat
  - Body: Almala Grampanchayat
- Demonym: Almalakar

Languages
  - Official: Marathi
- Pincode: 413520

Almala is a village in Latur district in the state of Maharashtra, India.
