= Tiru Dam =

- Location within Maharashtra
- Official name: Tiru Dam D01294
- Location: Udgir
- Coordinates: 18.555543°N 77.073641°E
- Opening date: 1976
- Owners: Government of Maharashtra, India

Dam and spillways
- Type of dam: Earthfill
- Impounds: Tiru river
- Height: 21 m (69 ft)
- Length: 1,851 m (6,073 ft)
- Dam volume: 311 km^{3} (75 cu mi)

Reservoir
- Total capacity: 15,401 km^{3} (3,695 cu mi)
- Surface area: 690 km^{2} (270 sq mi)

Tiru Dam, is an earthfill dam on Tiru river near Udgir, Latur district in the state of Maharashtra in India.

== Specifications ==
The height of the dam above its lowest foundation is 21 m (69 ft) while the length is 1,851 m (6,073 ft). The volume content is 311 km^{3} (75 cu mi) and gross storage capacity is 23,320.00 km^{3} (5,594.77 cu mi).

== Purpose ==
- Irrigation

== See also ==
- Dams in Maharashtra
- List of reservoirs and dams in India
