= Shirur Anantpal Taluka =

Shirur Anantpal Taluka is a taluka, administrative subdivision, of Latur District in Maharashtra, India. The administrative center for the taluka is the village of Shirur Anantpal. In the 2011 census there were forty-three Grampanchayat in Shirur Anantpal Taluka.

== Agriculture ==
While Latur District has some of the most fertile soils in the Marathwada region of Maharashtra, the best deep, black soils in Latur District are to the west of Shirur Anantpal Taluka. Soils in Shirur Anantpal tend toward a medium soil of an inferior type and the taluka suffers from a serious scarcity of water. The normal annual rainfall in Shirur Anantpal Taluka is only about 650 mm. Being a victim of the corrupt Maharashtra government administration and failed irrigation projects this taluka is one of the worst affected during drought periods. The annual rainfall for 2007 was 398 mm in Shirur Anantpal Taluka, compared to 810 mm that year in Latur Taluka. Only 5% of the successful borewells drilled in Latur District to relieve that drought were drilled in Shirur Anantpal Taluka.
