= Aussa =

Aussa or Awsa may refer to:

- The Sultanate of Aussa
- Asaita, a city also called Aussa

== See also ==
- American Woman Suffrage Association (AWSA)
