= Nalegaon =

Village in Maharashtra, India

- village
- Location in Maharashtra, India Nalegaon (India)
- Coordinates: 18°25′N 76°49′E
- Country: India
- State: Maharashtra
- District: Latur

Population
  - Total: 45,000

Languages
  - Official: Marathi
- Time zone: UTC+5:30 (IST)
- PIN: 413524
- Telephone code: 02381
- Vehicle registration: MH-24
- Coastline: 0 kilometres (0 mi)
- Nearest city: Chakur, Latur, Udgir
- Lok Sabha constituency: Latur

Nalegaon is a village in the Dindori taluka of Maharashtra.
