= Pasha Patel =

Indian politician

Member of Maharashtra Legislative Council
- In office 28 July 2006 – 27 July 2012
- Constituency: elected by MLAs

Personal details
- Citizenship: Indian
- Party: Bharatiya Janata Party (2001-Present)
- Occupation: Politician

Pasha Patel is a former member of the Maharashtra Legislative Council. He is chairman of Maharashtra state agricultural price commission. He is a member of the Bharatiya Janata Party.

== Political career ==
Patel began his political career with the Shetkari Sanghatana and was affiliated with the Nationalist Congress Party. Later, during 2001, he joined the Bharatiya Janata Party and the leader at the time, Gopinath Munde, due to differences with Sharad Pawar. Later he was selected as a member of the Maharashtra Legislative Council for Latur.
