= Ausa Assembly constituency =

Constituency of the Maharashtra legislative assembly in India

Coordinates: 18°15′6.96″N 76°30′0.07″E

Ausa
- Constituency No. 239 for the Maharashtra Legislative Assembly

Constituency details
- Country: India
- Region: Western India
- State: Maharashtra
- District: Latur
- Lok Sabha constituency: Osmanabad
- Established: 1952
- Total electors: 304,761
- Reservation: None

Member of Legislative Assembly
- 15th Maharashtra Legislative Assembly
- Incumbent Abhimanyu Dattatray Pawar
- Party: Bharatiya Janata Party
- Elected year: 2024

Ausa Assembly constituency is one of the Assembly constituency in Latur district.

After the delimitation exercise, the Ausa Assembly Constituency is made of some villages in Ausa taluk and some villages in Nilanga taluk. Remaining villages of Ausa taluka are attached to Latur Rural Assembly Constituency. Further the Ausa constituency is partially attached to Latur Lok Sabha and partially to Osmanabad Lok Sabha constituency.

In Ausa Assembly constituency traditionally Indian National Congress party is the strongest party.

== Members of the Legislative Assembly ==
| Election | Member | Party |
|---|---|---|
| 1952 | Devisingh Vanetsingh Chauhan | Indian National Congress |
| 1957 | Devisingh Vanetsingh Chauhan | Indian National Congress |
| 1962 | Mallanath Gundanath | Peasants and Workers Party of India |
| 1967 | V. S. Musande | Indian National Congress |
| 1972 | Keshavrao Sonawane | Indian National Congress |
| 1978 | Keshavrao Sonawane | Indian National Congress |
| 1980 | Shivshankarappa Vishwanathappa Utge | Indian National Congress |
| 1985 | Kishanrao Sampatrao Jadhav | Indian Congress |
| 1990 | Kishanrao Sampatrao Jadhav | Indian National Congress |
| 1995 | Kishanrao Sampatrao Jadhav | Indian National Congress |
| 1999 | Dinkar Baburao Mane | Shiv Sena |
| 2004 | Dinkar Baburao Mane | Shiv Sena |
| 2009 | Basavraj Madhavrao Patil | Indian National Congress |
| 2014 | Basavraj Madhavrao Patil | Indian National Congress |
| 2019 | Abhimanyu Dattatray Pawar | Bharatiya Janata Party |
| 2024 | Abhimanyu Dattatray Pawar | Bharatiya Janata Party |

== Election results ==
=== Assembly Election 2024 ===
2024 Maharashtra Legislative Assembly election : Ausa
| Party | Candidate | Votes | % | ±% |
|---|---|---|---|---|
| BJP | Abhimanyu Dattatray Pawar | 115,590 | 54.83 | ▲3.72 |
| SS(UBT) | Dinkar Baburao Mane | 82,128 | 38.96 | New |
| Independent | Shivaji Kerrappa Kumbhar | 4,147 | 1.97 | New |
| MNS | Nagrale Shivkumar Gangadhar | 1,541 | 0.73 | New |
| NOTA | None of the above | 497 | 0.24 | ▼0.18 |
| Margin of victory | | 33,462 | 15.87 | ▲1.55 |
| Turnout | | 211,313 | 69.34 | ▲3.36 |
| Total valid votes | | 210,816 | | |
| Registered electors | | 304,761 | | ▲7.33 |
| BJP hold | | Swing | ▲3.72 | |

=== Assembly Election 2019 ===
2019 Maharashtra Legislative Assembly election : Ausa
| Party | Candidate | Votes | % | ±% |
|---|---|---|---|---|
| BJP | Abhimanyu Dattatray Pawar | 95,340 | 51.11 | ▲29.61 |
| INC | Basavraj Madhavrao Patil | 68,626 | 36.79 | ▼0.12 |
| Independent | Bajrang Bhujangrao Jadhav | 9,588 | 5.14 | New |
| VBA | Sudhir Shankarrao Potdar | 8,168 | 4.38 | New |
| NOTA | None of the above | 783 | 0.42 | ▼0.11 |
| Margin of victory | | 26,714 | 14.32 | ▲9.23 |
| Turnout | | 187,346 | 65.98 | ▼1.75 |
| Total valid votes | | 186,551 | | |
| Registered electors | | 283,958 | | ▲9.93 |
| BJP gain from INC | | Swing | ▲14.20 | |

=== Assembly Election 2014 ===
2014 Maharashtra Legislative Assembly election : Ausa
| Party | Candidate | Votes | % | ±% |
|---|---|---|---|---|
| INC | Basavraj Madhavrao Patil | 64,237 | 36.91 | ▼13.98 |
| SS | Dinkar Baburao Mane | 55,379 | 31.82 | ▼10.16 |
| BJP | Pasha Patel | 37,414 | 21.50 | New |
| MNS | Balaji Gopalrao Gire | 5,929 | 3.41 | ▲1.44 |
| NCP | Buke Rajeshwar Vaijnath | 4,946 | 2.84 | New |
| PWPI | Jadhav Kisanrao Sampatrao | 2,698 | 1.55 | New |
| NOTA | None of the above | 916 | 0.53 | New |
| Margin of victory | | 8,858 | 5.09 | ▼3.82 |
| Turnout | | 174,942 | 67.73 | ▲1.87 |
| Total valid votes | | 174,020 | | |
| Registered electors | | 258,311 | | ▲2.37 |
| INC hold | | Swing | ▼13.98 | |

=== Assembly Election 2009 ===
2009 Maharashtra Legislative Assembly election : Ausa
| Party | Candidate | Votes | % | ±% |
|---|---|---|---|---|
| INC | Basavraj Madhavrao Patil | 84,526 | 50.89 | ▲13.92 |
| SS | Dinkar Baburao Mane | 69,731 | 41.98 | ▼10.90 |
| Independent | Suryawanshi Shrikant Shahuraj | 3,308 | 1.99 | New |
| MNS | Dayanand Dnyandeo Kadam | 3,271 | 1.97 | New |
| Shivrajya Party | Adv. Govind Trimbakrao Sirsat | 2,344 | 1.41 | New |
| Independent | Lohar Satish Vishwanath | 1,495 | 0.90 | New |
| Margin of victory | | 14,795 | 8.91 | ▼7.00 |
| Turnout | | 166,185 | 65.86 | ▼0.78 |
| Total valid votes | | 166,104 | | |
| Registered electors | | 252,337 | | ▲24.65 |
| INC gain from SS | | Swing | ▼1.99 | |

=== Assembly Election 2004 ===
2004 Maharashtra Legislative Assembly election : Ausa
| Party | Candidate | Votes | % | ±% |
|---|---|---|---|---|
| SS | Mane Dinakar Baburao | 71,324 | 52.88 | ▲15.34 |
| INC | Patil Shesherao Trimbakrao | 49,865 | 36.97 | ▲4.74 |
| BSP | Sontakke Shridharrao Mohanrao | 6,493 | 4.81 | New |
| Independent | Ghadage Ramrao Kishanrao | 3,515 | 2.61 | New |
| Independent | Yevale Shrimanth Arjun | 1,509 | 1.12 | New |
| Independent | Manohar Anandrao Patil | 931 | 0.69 | New |
| Margin of victory | | 21,459 | 15.91 | ▲10.60 |
| Turnout | | 134,897 | 66.64 | ▼6.69 |
| Total valid votes | | 134,879 | | |
| Registered electors | | 202,440 | | ▲27.17 |
| SS hold | | Swing | ▲15.34 | |

=== Assembly Election 1999 ===
1999 Maharashtra Legislative Assembly election : Ausa
| Party | Candidate | Votes | % | ±% |
|---|---|---|---|---|
| SS | Mane Dinakar Baburao | 41,052 | 37.54 | ▲14.43 |
| INC | Patel Mohammed Mujibodin Ismail | 35,243 | 32.23 | ▼13.52 |
| NCP | Jadhav Kishanrao Sampatrao | 27,279 | 24.95 | New |
| Independent | Arab Aslambin Talabsaheb | 3,692 | 3.38 | New |
| Independent | Jadhav Ankush Namdeo | 753 | 0.69 | New |
| Margin of victory | | 5,809 | 5.31 | ▼17.33 |
| Turnout | | 116,735 | 73.33 | ▼10.41 |
| Total valid votes | | 109,348 | | |
| Registered electors | | 159,185 | | ▲7.26 |
| SS gain from INC | | Swing | ▼8.21 | |

=== Assembly Election 1995 ===
1995 Maharashtra Legislative Assembly election : Ausa
| Party | Candidate | Votes | % | ±% |
|---|---|---|---|---|
| INC | Jadhav Kishanrao Sampatrao | 55,603 | 45.75 | ▼3.34 |
| SS | Jadhav Suryabhan Narayanrao | 28,084 | 23.11 | ▲4.57 |
| Independent | Kakde Shripati Nivarati | 23,008 | 18.93 | New |
| BBM | Patel Hasham Ismail | 9,712 | 7.99 | New |
| Independent | Shinde Triambakrao Ishwara | 1,798 | 1.48 | New |
| Independent | Tike Nagorao Shankar | 825 | 0.68 | New |
| Margin of victory | | 27,519 | 22.64 | ▼7.90 |
| Turnout | | 124,284 | 83.74 | ▲14.49 |
| Total valid votes | | 121,543 | | |
| Registered electors | | 148,413 | | ▲9.28 |
| INC hold | | Swing | ▼3.34 | |

=== Assembly Election 1990 ===
1990 Maharashtra Legislative Assembly election : Ausa
| Party | Candidate | Votes | % | ±% |
|---|---|---|---|---|
| INC | Jadhav Kishanrao Sampatrao | 45,272 | 49.09 | ▲12.35 |
| SS | Jadhav Suryabhan Narayanrao | 17,102 | 18.54 | New |
| Independent | Patil Chandrashekhar Keshvrao | 16,223 | 17.59 | New |
| JD | Patil Madhavrao Santram | 10,718 | 11.62 | New |
| Independent | Utage Bhimashankarappa Shivmurtiappa | 733 | 0.79 | New |
| Independent | Chavan Baliram Sitaram | 647 | 0.70 | New |
| Margin of victory | | 28,170 | 30.54 | ▲11.72 |
| Turnout | | 94,050 | 69.25 | ▼1.42 |
| Total valid votes | | 92,228 | | |
| Registered electors | | 135,810 | | ▲23.28 |
| INC gain from IC(S) | | Swing | ▼6.48 | |

=== Assembly Election 1985 ===
1985 Maharashtra Legislative Assembly election : Ausa
| Party | Candidate | Votes | % | ±% |
|---|---|---|---|---|
| IC(S) | Jadhav Kishanrao Sampatrao | 42,670 | 55.57 | New |
| INC | Utge Shivshankarappa Vishwanathappa | 28,216 | 36.74 | New |
| Independent | Pawar Monohar Madhavrao | 2,560 | 3.33 | New |
| Independent | Jadhav Manik Bhimrao | 2,017 | 2.63 | New |
| Independent | Sarvade Gangadhar Goroba | 649 | 0.85 | New |
| Independent | Bansode Vithal Bhungrao | 560 | 0.73 | New |
| Margin of victory | | 14,454 | 18.82 | ▲18.63 |
| Turnout | | 77,854 | 70.67 | ▲7.46 |
| Total valid votes | | 76,790 | | |
| Registered electors | | 110,165 | | ▲13.71 |
| IC(S) gain from INC(U) | | Swing | ▲8.58 | |

=== Assembly Election 1980 ===
1980 Maharashtra Legislative Assembly election : Ausa
| Party | Candidate | Votes | % | ±% |
|---|---|---|---|---|
| INC(U) | Utge Shivshankarappa Vishwanathappa | 28,258 | 46.99 | New |
| INC(I) | Patel Mohammed Mujibodin Ismail | 28,144 | 46.80 | ▲36.90 |
| BJP | Deshpande Vasantrao Hanmantrao | 3,733 | 6.21 | New |
| Margin of victory | | 114 | 0.19 | ▼1.27 |
| Turnout | | 61,234 | 63.21 | ▼7.88 |
| Total valid votes | | 60,135 | | |
| Registered electors | | 96,880 | | ▲4.59 |
| INC(U) gain from INC | | Swing | ▲16.65 | |

=== Assembly Election 1978 ===
1978 Maharashtra Legislative Assembly election : Ausa
| Party | Candidate | Votes | % | ±% |
|---|---|---|---|---|
| INC | Keshavrao Sonawane | 19,321 | 30.34 | ▼42.46 |
| Independent | Patil Madhavrao Santram | 18,393 | 28.88 | New |
| JP | Jadhav Kashinath Gunaji | 11,734 | 18.42 | New |
| INC(I) | Chincholikar Vasantrao Nanarao | 6,303 | 9.90 | New |
| PWPI | Rachatte (Shete) Virbhadrappa Mahadappa | 3,407 | 5.35 | New |
| Independent | Gangadhar Goroba | 2,617 | 4.11 | New |
| Independent | Hashami Mazharullah Khairat Ali | 1,915 | 3.01 | New |
| Margin of victory | | 928 | 1.46 | ▼47.90 |
| Turnout | | 65,851 | 71.09 | ▲6.50 |
| Total valid votes | | 63,690 | | |
| Registered electors | | 92,627 | | ▼5.55 |
| INC hold | | Swing | ▼42.46 | |

=== Assembly Election 1972 ===
1972 Maharashtra Legislative Assembly election : Ausa
| Party | Candidate | Votes | % | ±% |
|---|---|---|---|---|
| INC | Keshavrao Sonawane | 44,153 | 72.80 | ▲19.59 |
| CPI | Dinkarrao Fatepurkar | 14,216 | 23.44 | New |
| ABJS | Jadhav Kashinath Gunaji | 2,281 | 3.76 | ▲0.74 |
| Margin of victory | | 29,937 | 49.36 | ▲38.12 |
| Turnout | | 63,342 | 64.59 | ▼1.93 |
| Total valid votes | | 60,650 | | |
| Registered electors | | 98,071 | | ▲15.99 |
| INC hold | | Swing | ▲19.59 | |

=== Assembly Election 1967 ===
1967 Maharashtra Legislative Assembly election : Ausa
| Party | Candidate | Votes | % | ±% |
|---|---|---|---|---|
| INC | V. S. Musande | 27,882 | 53.21 | ▲3.63 |
| PWPI | M. G. Maharaj | 21,994 | 41.97 | ▼8.45 |
| ABJS | Jadhav Kashinath Gunaji | 1,584 | 3.02 | New |
| Independent | H. N. S. Holikar | 940 | 1.79 | New |
| Margin of victory | | 5,888 | 11.24 | ▲10.39 |
| Turnout | | 56,241 | 66.52 | ▼3.47 |
| Total valid votes | | 52,400 | | |
| Registered electors | | 84,553 | | ▲11.98 |
| INC gain from PWPI | | Swing | ▲2.79 | |

=== Assembly Election 1962 ===
1962 Maharashtra Legislative Assembly election : Ausa
| Party | Candidate | Votes | % | ±% |
|---|---|---|---|---|
| PWPI | Mallanath Gundanath | 25,296 | 50.42 | ▲1.54 |
| INC | Devisingh Vanetsingh Chauhan | 24,872 | 49.58 | ▼1.54 |
| Margin of victory | | 424 | 0.85 | ▼1.38 |
| Turnout | | 52,847 | 69.99 | ▲18.05 |
| Total valid votes | | 50,168 | | |
| Registered electors | | 75,504 | | ▲15.85 |
| PWPI gain from INC | | Swing | ▼0.70 | |

=== Assembly Election 1957 ===
1957 Bombay State Legislative Assembly election : Ausa
| Party | Candidate | Votes | % | ±% |
|---|---|---|---|---|
| INC | Devisingh Vanetsingh Chauhan | 17,303 | 51.12 | ▼11.97 |
| PWPI | Mallanath Kelgaowar | 16,548 | 48.88 | ▲22.82 |
| Margin of victory | | 755 | 2.23 | ▼34.79 |
| Turnout | | 33,851 | 51.94 | ▼8.28 |
| Total valid votes | | 33,851 | | |
| Registered electors | | 65,173 | | ▲41.29 |
| INC hold | | Swing | ▼11.97 | |

=== Assembly Election 1952 ===
1952 Hyderabad State Legislative Assembly election : Ausa
| Party | Candidate | Votes | % | ±% |
|---|---|---|---|---|
| INC | Devisingh Vanetsingh Chauhan | 17,524 | 63.09 | New |
| PWPI | Digamber Rao Desai | 7,240 | 26.06 | New |
| Socialist | Sheshrao Shankar Rao | 2,100 | 7.56 | New |
| ABHM | Dattatraya Rao | 913 | 3.29 | New |
| Margin of victory | | 10,284 | 37.02 | |
| Turnout | | 27,777 | 60.22 | |
| Total valid votes | | 27,777 | | |
| Registered electors | | 46,126 | | |
| INC win (new seat) | | | | |
