= Avalkonda =

Village in India

Coordinates: 13.196882°N 79.263192°E

Avalkonda or Avalakonda or Alikonda is a major village located in the Gangadhara Nellore mandal of Chittoor District in Andhra Pradesh state, India.

Manya P Kasturi Reddi and Manya RB Patnaik had done a survey and mapping in 1957.

A Shia-Mosque in Avalkonda village in Chittoor district has got landed property in Pasumarthi, Agavamchori, Gudiyattum and Tippa Samudram of North Arcot district, Madras state. Inams for the mosque are situated in Vellore and Gudiyattum taluqs of North Arcot district, Madras State.
