= Dayanand College Latur =

College in Maharashtra, India

- DCL
- Other name: DCL
- Motto: Aa No Bhadra Krutavo Yantu Vishvastah
- Type: Private
- Active: May 1961–Open
- Affiliations: Swami Ramanand Teerth Marathwada University,
- Chairman: Laxmiraman Bankatlal Lahoti
- Principal: Jayprakash S. Dargad
- Academic staff: 49
- Administrative staff: 48
- Students: 10,000
- Undergraduates: 500
- Postgraduates: 200
- Location: Latur, Maharashtra, India
- Campus: Urban
- Website: dsclatur.org

Dayanand Education Society was established in 1961 to impart higher education in to the students of this rural area. It offers education in English as well as in Marathi medium. The college was established in 1961. The college is an authorized centre of the Institute of Chartered Accountants of India (ICAI) for CA examinations.

== History ==
Dayanand Education society was established in the year 1961 in the month of May. Earlier Latur was small town in the Osmanabad District. Facilities for higher education were not available in the Latur so students were left with no option but going to cities like Hyderabad, Pune, and Mumbai and so on.

Student from middle class and lower-middle-class families were not able to afford the costs of education and other costs arising from the needs to live in the cities like Mumbai, Pune etc. Higher education was rather like a dream for students from poor families. So to make the higher education facilities accessible to children of farmers, agricultural laborers, workers; the dignitaries and business people like Manikrao Sonavane (elder brother of Keshavrao Sonawane), Chandrashekhar Vajpeyi, Ramgopal Rathi and Keshavrao Sonawane established Dayanand Education Society in the May month of year 1961

Manikrao Sonavane, elder brother of Keshavrao and chairman of market committee, convinced the farmers of Latur to contribute to this cause. Keshavrao Sonavane, Co-Operative Minister of the Maharashtra state, contributed to this cause by completing all required formal government procedures.

== Affiliated institutes ==
The society runs Eight colleges in Latur.

- Dayanand College of Commerce
- Dayanand College of Arts
- Dayanand Science College
- Dayanand College of Law
- Dayanand College of Pharmacy
- Dayanand Collage Of Animation
- Dayanand College of fashion designing and interior decoration
- Dayanand College of Architecture
- Dayanand Institute of Pharmacy

== Research Centre of Commerce and Management ==
University, Nashik. Dr. Brijmohan Dayma has been recognized as the Research guide in Commerce and Management faculty of S.R.T.M. University.

== Workshop on 'Gateway to SET/NET' ==
The college conducted a State level Workshop on 'Gateway to NET/SET exams'on 1 May 2010.

== Awards and accolades ==
Earlier this college was affiliated to Dr. Babasaheb Ambedkar Marathwada University Aurangabad, but since the formation of a university in Nanded now its affiliated to Swami Ramanand Teerth Marathwada University.
