= Ausa Taluka =

- Taluka
- Interactive map of Ausa Taluka
- Coordinates: 18.2519689°N 76.4876887°E
- Country: India
- State: Maharashtra
- District: Latur district
- Headquarters: Ausa

Government
  - Type: Panchayat Samiti
  - Body: Panchayat Samiti Ausa

Area
  - Total: 1,297.6 km^{2} (501.0 sq mi)

Population (2015)
  - Total: 335,890
  - Density: 258.85/km^{2} (670.43/sq mi)

Ausa Taluka is a taluka, or an administrative subdivision, of Latur District in Maharashtra, India. The administrative center for the taluka is the town of Ausa. At the 2011 census, there were 108 panchayat villages in Ausa Taluka.

== Geography ==
Ausa Taluka has an average elevation of 634 metres (2080 feet). Among the major revenue circle villages are: Almala, Ujani, Bhada, Lamjana, Killari and Matola. Geographically, the area of Bhada is bigger in the Ausa Taluka.

== Demographics ==
In 2011, the total population of Ausa Taluka was 309,846, up from 275,247 in 2001.
