= Chakur =

Village in Maharashtra, India

Chakur (Chakrapur)
- Town
- Location in Maharashtra, India Chakur (India)
- Coordinates: 18°30′47″N 76°52′31″E
- Country: India
- State: Maharashtra
- District: Latur
- Taluka: Chakur

Government
  - Body: Nagar panchayat

Area
  - Total: 5 km^{2} (1.9 sq mi)

Population (2011)
  - Total: 18,627
  - Density: 3,700/km^{2} (9,600/sq mi)

Languages
  - Official: Marathi
- Time zone: UTC+5:30 (IST)
- PIN: 413513
- Telephone code: +91-2381
- Vehicle registration: MH-24
- gender ratio: 1000:935
- Lok Sabha constituency: Latur
- Vidhan Sabha constituency: Ahmedpur
- Literacy: 76%
- Website: maharashtra.gov.in

Chakur is a town in Latur subdivision of Latur district in the Indian state of Maharashtra. It is also the headquarters for Chakur Taluka. The Town located on Maharashtra State Highway 3 (Sangli-Nanded-Nagpur National Highway NH 361). Former Home Minister of India Shivraj Patil is from Chakur. Chakrapuri is the old name of chakur city.

== Demographics ==
In the 2001 Indian census Chakur had a population of 16,122 inhabitants.

== Tourism ==
Chakur is situated on the state highway of Latur-Nanded which is around 35 km from Latur city. This place is popular among tourists for a Lord Shiva Temple and an amusement park.
