= Renapur =

Village in Maharashtra, India

- Town
- Location in Maharashtra, India Renapur (India)
- Coordinates: 18°31′0″N 76°36′0″E
- Country: India
- State: Maharashtra
- District: Latur
- Taluka: Renapur
- Elevation: 515 m (1,690 ft)

Population (2011)
  - Total: 11,596
- Demonym: Renapurkar

Languages
  - Official: Marathi
- Time zone: UTC+5:30 (IST)
- PINCODE: 431522
- Vehicle registration: MH24
- Nearest city: Latur
- Lok Sabha constituency: Latur
- Vidhan Sabha constituency: Latur Rural

Renapur is a City in Latur subdivision of Latur District in the Indian state of Maharashtra. It is the headquarters for Renapur Taluka. The town is located 20 kilometres from the city of Latur, the district administrative centre. There is a temple of Renuka devi, and there is a river named Rena. Because of these two reasons Renapur is very popular. There is a popular market named "Chandani chowk".

Due to an influx of workers to the city of Latur, it expanded towards Renapur during the 1990s, 2000s and 2010s. Formerly, Renapur was in Beed District, but it was moved to Latur District.

== History ==
Renapur was part of Nizam's Hyderabad State. Under the British, Renapur was known as the land of freedom fighters. Mr. Murgappa Khumse was a well known^{Questioned} freedom fighter who came from this area. He was also a part of Goa Mukti Sangram (Goa Peasant Organization), Hyderabad Mukti Sangram (Hyderabad Peasant Organization) and freedom fighting throughout India. He was the chief of Shatkari Shetmajur Panchayat for the state of Maharashtra. He was social worker and also a writer. Dharmoji Prataparav Garje: Remembered in local history as a Vanjari chief who resisted Nizam and British authority in the early 19th century.

== Demographics ==
In the 2001 Indian census, the village of Renapur recorded 11,596 inhabitants, of which 5,956 were males (51.4%) and 5,640 were females (48.6%).
