= Murud, Latur =

Village in Maharashtra

Murud
- Village
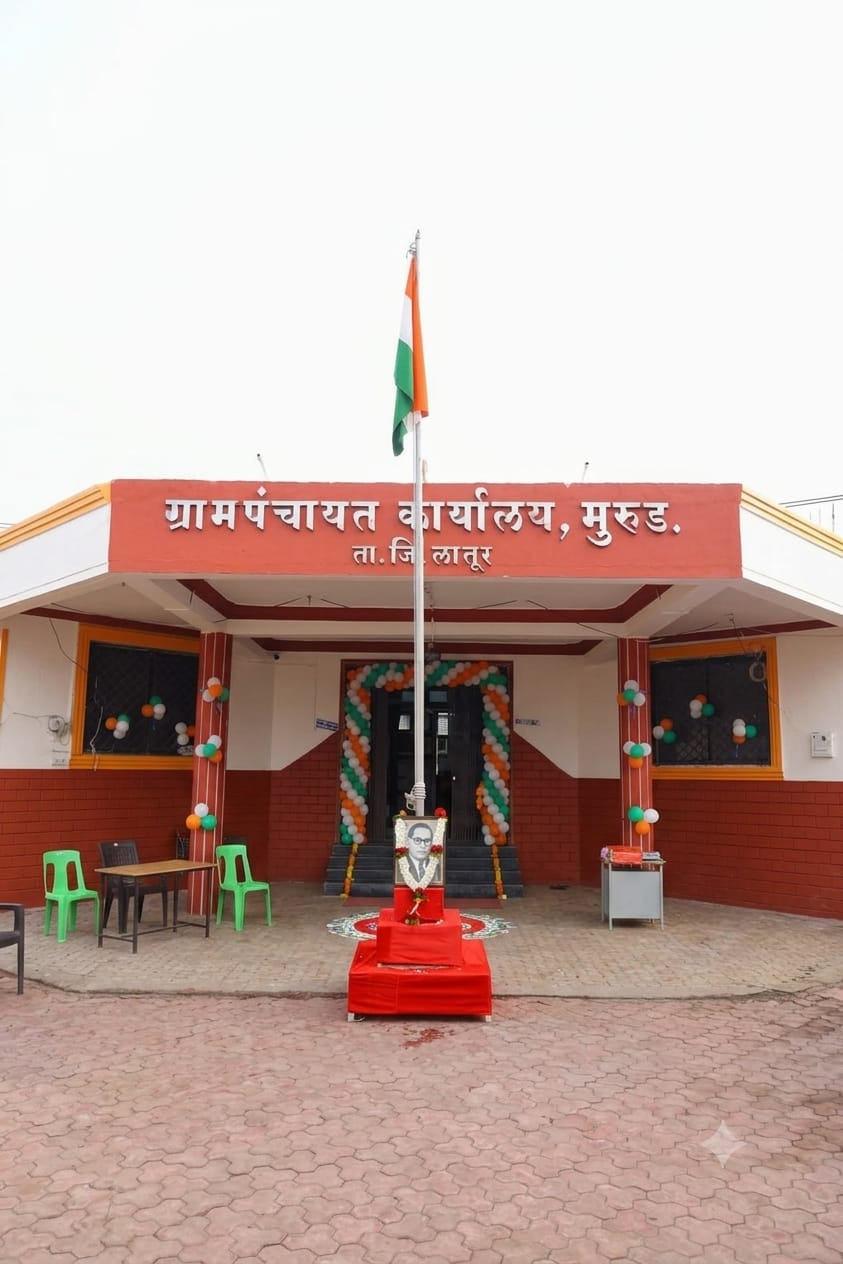
- Interactive map of Murud
- Country: India
- State: Maharashtra
- District: Latur

Government
  - Type: Sarpanch
  - Body: Gram Panchayat

Population (2020)
  - Total: 104,250

Languages
  - Official: Marathi
- Time zone: UTC+5:30 (IST)
- PIN: 413510
- Vehicle registration: MH 24
- Nearest city: Latur
- Lok Sabha constituency: Latur
- Vidhan Sabha constituency: Latur Rural
- Civic agency: Gram Panchayat

Murud is the largest village in Maharashtra in terms of both population and geographical area. Situated on the border of the Latur and Dharashiv districts, it functions as the largest Gram Panchayat in the Marathwada region.

Possessing a heritage that dates back to the Nizam era, the village is home to ancient and historical sites such as the ancient Murudeshwar Temple and the historic Shri Datta Temple. A weekly market is held in the village every Wednesday, drawing people from approximately 40 surrounding villages; additionally, a large livestock market takes place twice a week, attracting sellers and buyers from both within and outside the state.

The village got a new bus stop in May 2026.

== Chatrapati Shivaji Maharaj Chowk ==
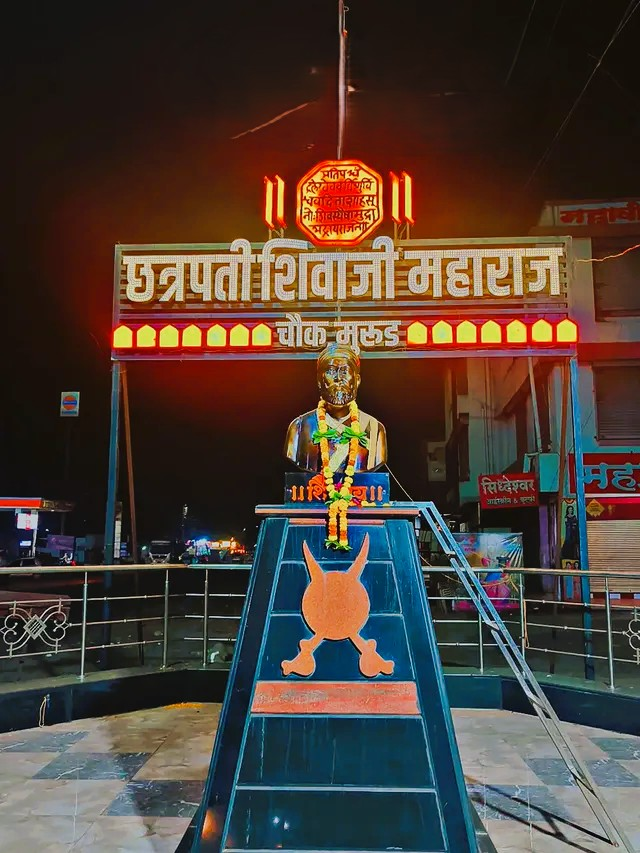
Chatrapati Shivaji Maharaj Chowk, Murud

Chatrapati Shivaji Maharaj Chowk Murud.

== Temples ==
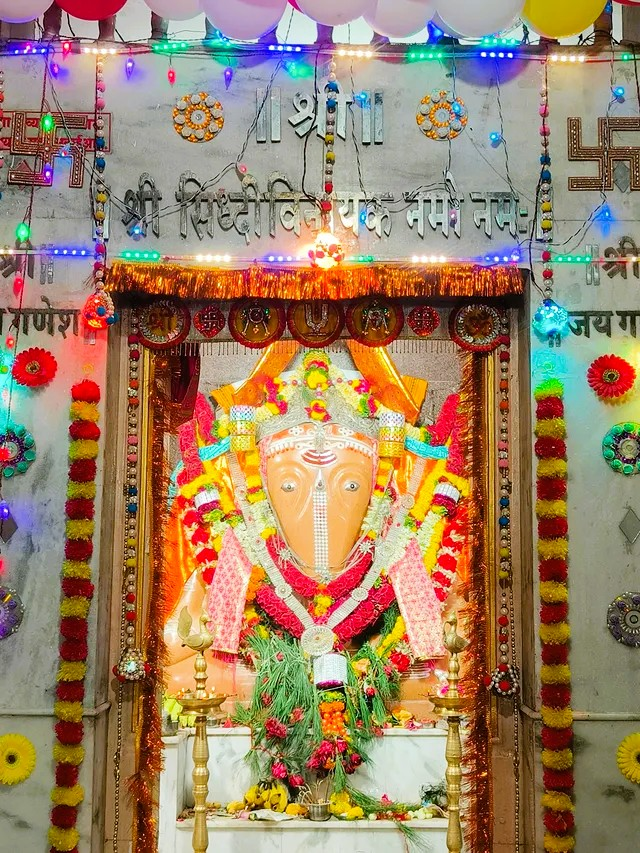
Shri Siddhivinayak Madir Murud

- Shri Datta Mandir
- Shri Siddhivinayak Mandir
- Murdeshvar Mandir
- Hanuman mandir
- Balaji Mandir
- Sai Baba Mandir
- Jagdamba Mandir
- Tukai Devi Mandir
