= Shirur Anantpal =

Village in Maharashtra

- town
- Location in Maharashtra, India
- Coordinates: 18°20′19″N 76°50′24″E
- Country: India
- State: Maharashtra
- District: Latur
- Taluka: Shirur Anantpal

Population (2011)
  - Total: 83,528

Languages
  - Official: Marathi
- Time zone: UTC+5:30 (IST)
- PIN: 413544
- Telephone code: +91-2384 (or 02384)
- Vehicle registration: MH24 / MH55
- Lok Sabha constituency: Latur
- Vidhan Sabha constituency: Nilanga
- Average Temperature: Summer 40°C (104°F); Winter 25°C (77°F)

Shirur Anantpal is a town With A Nagar panchyat and headquarters of Shirur Anantpal Taluka in Latur district in the Indian state of Maharashtra.

== Demographics ==
In the 2001 Indian census the village of was reported to have 8,682 inhabitants, with 4,535 males (52.2%) and 4,147 females (47.8%), for a ratio of 914 females per 1000 males.
