= Nilanga Taluka =

Taluka of Latur, Maharashtra, India

Nilanga Taluka is a taluka of the Latur district in Maharashtra, India. The administrative center for the taluka is the town of Nilanga. At the 2011 census, there were 116 panchayat villages in Nilanga Taluka.
