= Ausa (town) =

- city
- Location in Maharashtra, India
- Coordinates: 18.25°N 76.5°E
- Country: India
- State: Maharashtra
- District: Latur
- Taluka: Ausa

Government
  - Type: Municipal Council
  - Body: Ausa Nagar Parishad

Area
  - Total: 5.4 km^{2} (2.1 sq mi)
- Elevation: 634 m (2,080 ft)

Population (2015)
  - Total: 70,294
  - Density: 13,001/km^{2} (33,670/sq mi)
- Demonym: Ausekar

Languages
  - Official: Marathi
- Time zone: UTC+5:30 (IST)
- PIN: 413520
- Telephone Code: +91-(0)2383 XXXXXX
- Vehicle registration: MH-24
- Lok Sabha constituency: Osmanabad
- Vidhan Sabha constituency: Ausa
- Website: maharashtra.gov.in

Ausa is a town and Municipal Council in Latur District in the state of Maharashtra, India. It is also the headquarters for Ausa Taluka One of the ten talukas in latur.

== Geography ==
Ausa is located at 18.25°N 76.5°E. It has an average elevation of 634 metres (2080 feet).

== History ==
When Ausa was named Taluka, the recent Latur district place was a just part of this big Ausa Taluka. Ausa is as it is, but, Latur developed as a big city and a district place having more than 5 lac population. Ausa has an ancient fort. It was developed in es1200 and an iconic temple in the town is of the warkari saints Veernath and Mallinath Maharaj Ausekar.

== Agriculture ==
Around the Killari area, grape production is large and is an important export. In the Almala village are famous for production is sugarcane. Bhada, Shivli and Warwada villages are famous for producing carrots, soyabean in whole district. The major river in Ausa is Tavaraja and Terana. It is a large market for livestock, such as cattle, buffaloes, and goats in both the Latur and Osmanabad districts.

== Demographics ==
As of 2001 India census, Ausa had a population of 30,876. Males constitute 51% of the population and females 49%. 16% of the population is under 6 years of age. Marathi and Urdu are widely spoken by the people here.

Religions in Ausa
Religion	Percent
Hindus	52%
Muslims	45%
Buddhists	2%
Christians	0.2%
Jains	0.2%
Others†	0.4%
Distribution of religions †Includes Sikhs (0.2%), OBC, VJNT (<0.2%).
