= Nilanga =

Nilanga Nirlingpur
- City
- Location in Maharashtra, India
- Coordinates: 18°06′58″N 76°45′09″E
- Country: India
- State: Maharashtra
- District: Latur
- Taluka: Nilanga
- Elevation: 583 m (1,913 ft)

Population (2015)
  - Total: 72,000

Languages
  - Official: Marathi
- Time zone: UTC+5:30 (IST)
- PINCODE: 413521
- Vehicle registration: MH-24
- Lok Sabha constituency: Latur
- Vidhan Sabha constituency: Nilanga

Nilanga is a town with a municipal council in Latur District in the Indian state of Maharashtra. It is also the headquarters for Nilanga Taluka.

== Demographics ==
As of 2011 India census, Nilanga had a population of 36,112. Males constituted 52% of the population and females 48%. Literacy rate of Nilanga is 80%, lower than the state average of 82.34%. In Nilanga, literacy among males is around 85.84% while the female literacy rate is 73.71%. In 2011 in Nilanga, 13% of the population was under 6 years of age.

Schedule Castes (SC) constitute 19.42% while Schedule Tribes (ST) were 1.98% of the total population in Nilanga.

Religions in Nilanga
Religion	Percent
Hindus	70%
Buddhists	10%
Muslims	16%
Christians	0.2%
Jains	3.4%
Others†	0.4%
Distribution of religions †Includes Sikhs (0.2%), OBC, VJNT (<0.2%).

== Education ==
- Maharashtra College of Engineering Nilanga
