= Latur district =

- District of Maharashtra
- Location in Maharashtra
- Coordinates (Udgir): 18.4°N 76.58°E
- Country: India
- State: Maharashtra
- Established: 16 August 1982 (29th District of Maharashtra)
- Headquarters: Latur
- Tehsils: Latur; Udgir; Ausa; Nilanga; Ahmedpur; Renapur; Shirur Anantpal; Jalkot; Deoni; Chakur

Government
  - Type: District council
  - Body: Latur Zilla Parishad
  - Guardian Minister: Shivendra Raje Bhosale (Cabinet Minister)
  - President Zilla Parishad: Smt. Ushatai Sambhajirao Patil Talegaonkar (BJP)
  - Vice President Zilla Parishad: Mr. Dayanand Surwase (NCP)
  - District Collector: Dr. Bharat Bastewad (IAS)
  - CEO Zilla Parishad: Rahul Kumar Meena (IAS)
  - MPs: Shivaji Bandappa Kalge (Latur)

Area
  - Total: 7,157 km^{2} (2,763 sq mi)
  - Urban: 117.78 km^{2} (45.48 sq mi)
- Elevation: 515 m (1,690 ft)
- Highest elevation: 636 m (2,087 ft)

Population (2011)
  - Total: 2,454,196
  - Density: 342.9/km^{2} (888.1/sq mi)
  - Urban: 25.47%

Demographics
  - Literacy: 79.03%
  - Sex ratio: 924
- Time zone: UTC+05:30 (IST)
- Vehicle registration: MH24, MH55
- Official language: Marathi
- Major highways: NH 361
- Website: latur.gov.in/en/

Latur district (Marathi pronunciation: [laːt̪uːɾ]) is a district in Maharashtra state of India. Latur City is the district headquarters and is the 16th largest city in the state of Maharashtra. The district is primarily agricultural. Urban population makes up 25.47% of the total population.

== Officers and Public Representatives ==
=== Members of Parliament ===
Member of Parliament	Political Party	Lok Sabha Constituency
Shivaji Bandappa Kalge	Indian National Congress	Latur

=== Guardian Minister ===
Guardian Minister Latur
- Emblem of India
- Incumbent; Shivendra Raje Bhosale since 18 January 2025
- Style: The Honourable
- Appointer: Chief Minister of Maharashtra
- Term length: 5 years / No time limit
- Website: latur.gov.in/en/

==== List of Guardian Minister ====
Name	Term of office
Pankaja Munde	31 October 2014 - 8 November 2019
Amit Deshmukh	9 January 2020 - 29 June 2022
Girish Mahajan	24 September 2022 - 26 November 2024
Shivendra Raje Bhosale	18 January 2025 - Incumbent

=== District Magistrate/Collector ===
District Magistrate / Collector Latur
- Emblem of India
- Incumbent; Dr. Bharat Bastewad (IAS) since 4 April 2026
- Residence: At Latur district
- Appointer: Government of Maharashtra
- Term length: No time limit
- Website: latur.gov.in/en/

Chief Executive Officer, Zilla Parishad, Latur
- Emblem of India
- Incumbent; Rahul Kumar Meena (IAS) since 2025
- Website: zplatur.gov.in/en/

== History ==
Latur has an ancient history, which probably dates to the Rashtrakuta period. It was home to a branch of Rashtrakutas which ruled the Deccan 753-973 AD. The first Rashtrakuta king Dantidurga was from Lattalur, probably the ancient name for Latur. Anecdotally, Ratnapur is mentioned as a name for Latur.

The King Amoghavarsha of Rashtrakuta developed Latur city, originally the native place of the Rashtrakutas. The Rashtrakutas who succeeded the Chalukyas of Badami in 753 AD called themselves the residents of Lattalur.

It was, over the centuries, ruled by the Satavahanas, the Sakas, the Chalukyas, the Yadavas of Devgiri, the Delhi Sultans, the Bahamani rulers of South India, Adilshahi, and the Mughals.

In the 17th century, it became part of the independent princely state of Hyderabad. Under the Hyderabad of Nizams, the tax system was reformed and many of the exploitative taxing practices were ended. In 1905 it was merged with surrounding areas, renamed Latur tehsil, and became part of Osmanabad district, which until 17 September 1948 was a part of Hyderabad Kingdom under the Nizams. The chief of Nizam's Razakar army Qasim Rizwi was from Latur.

After independence and the merger of Hyderabad with the Indian Union, Osmanabad became part of Bombay Province. On 1 May 1960, with the creation of Maharashtra, Osmanabad was one of its districts. Because of the concerted efforts of Former Cooperation minister Keshavrao Sonawane and then newly elected member of assembly Vilasrao Deshmukh on 16 August 1982, a separate Latur district was carved out of Osmanabad district.

In Latur's Papvinashak Temple a 12th-century Kannada inscription of Western Chalukya emperor Someshvara III was found. According to that inscription, 500 scholars were living in Lattlaur (Latur) at that time and that Latur was the city of King Someshwar.

== Geography ==
Latur district is in the Marathwada region in Maharashtra in India, located between 17°52' North to 18°50' North and 76°18' East to 79°12' East in the Deccan plateau. It has an average elevation of 631 metres (2,070 ft) above mean sea level. The entire district of Latur is on the Balaghat plateau, 540 to 638 metres from the mean sea level.

Latur District is bound by Udgir district to the northeast, Osmanabad district to the south-west, and Beed.

=== Climate ===
Average rainfall in the district is 600 to 800 mm. This is usually during the monsoon months from July to October. Moderate temperatures are mainly observed. The rainfall is unpredictable in tune with the Indian monsoon. Summers begin from early March to July. Summers are dry and hot. The temperature ranges from 25 °C to 39.6 °C, though at the peak they may reach 45 °C. November to January is the winter season. Temperatures at the peak drop to single digits but usually they hover around 12 °C to 21.8 °C sometimes lowers up to 11 °C. January to March are the months with moderate temperatures.

=== Rivers, lakes and dams ===
The district lies in the Godavari river basin. Much of the water used in the district comes from the Manjara River, which suffered from environmental degradation and silting in the late 20th and early 21st centuries. Other major rivers of the district are the Terna (Tirna), Rena, Manar, Tawarja (Tawarjo), Tiru and Gharni. These rivers and a number of smaller ones are dammed to provide both irrigation and drinking water. Large dams include the Devargan Dam, Gharni Dam, Masalga Dam, Sakol Dam on the Sol River, Tawarja Dam, and Tiru Dam. On the northern plains of the district there are three main rivers, the Manyad, the Lendi (a tributary of the Teru), and the Teru (Tiru).

== Demographics ==
Historical population
Year	Pop.	±% p.a.
1901	423,609	—
1911	506,549	+1.80%
1921	479,723	−0.54%
1931	540,019	+1.19%
1941	600,373	+1.07%
1951	660,823	+0.96%
1961	818,160	+2.16%
1971	1,048,618	+2.51%
1981	1,292,882	+2.12%
1991	1,676,641	+2.63%
2001	2,080,285	+2.18%
2011	2,454,196	+1.67%

Religions in Latur district (2011)
Religion	Percent
Hinduism	81.78%
Islam	14.98%
Buddhism	2.71%
Other or not stated	0.53%

According to the 2011 census Latur district had a population of 2,454,196, roughly equal to the nation of Kuwait or the US state of Nevada. This gives it a ranking of 181st among the districts of India (out of a total of 640). The district had a population density of 343 inhabitants per square kilometre (890/sq mi). Its population growth rate over the decade 2001-2011 was 18.04%. Latur had a sex ratio of 924 females for every 1000 males, and a literacy rate of 79.03%. 25.46% of the population lives in urban areas. Scheduled Castes and Scheduled Tribes make up 19.60% and 2.34% of the population respectively.

Languages of Latur district (2011)
1. Marathi (81.8%)
2. Hindi (8.08%)
3. Urdu (6.37%)
4. Lambadi (1.82%)
5. Others (1.98%)

At the time of the 2011 Census of India, 81.75% of the population in the district spoke Marathi, 8.08% Hindi, 6.37% Urdu and 1.82% Lambadi as their first language.

== Culture and Religion ==
Shri Siddeshwar fair at Latur is held every year. Thousands of people attend the Gangaram Maharaj Samadhi every Ekadashi at Hattibet in Udgir tehsil.

In January 2011, the first ever 'Latur Festival' was organised on 10, 11 and 12 January under the guidance of Mr. Amit Deshmukh. The grand success of this event has now ensured a permanent spot on the cultural calendar. Now this is an annual fixture. The event is organised by the Latur Club.

== Education ==
=== Latur Pattern ===
The Latur Pattern of study was developed by former principals Janardan Waghmare and Aniruddha Jadhav of Rajarshi Shahu College in Latur, India.

The 'Latur pattern' is a combination of special training and intensive coaching. Students solve a series of probable question papers and attend coaching sessions to prepare them for the exams.

Latur pattern is a mechanical methodology of continuous study designed to help students in providing point-to-point answers to questions which could be expected in the examination. It became the standard for secondary, higher secondary, and university education in the Maharashtra state of India. This educational technique has become widely adopted in other parts of the state due to the success of student's in Maharashtra on the standardized Common Entrance Examinations (CET).

This methodology, has been criticized by many educators in India, who consider it a tool to gain temporary advantage, that does not prepare them for advanced learning.

=== Higher education ===
In recent years, Latur has emerged as a hub for higher education. There are many institutions which offer college and university degrees, including STMEI'S Sandipani Technical Campus - Faculty of Engineering and Polytechnic, Latur. Most of the well established professional degree colleges are located in Latur City, however, many have recently been erected in sub-urban areas. Being renowned for its results, Latur City attracts many students from different parts of the state.

=== Primary and secondary education ===
There are as many as 1284 primary schools run by and 487 private schools affiliated to the Education department of Latur District Council. The primary medium of teaching in most of these schools is Marathi. However; many schools observe English, Semi-English, Urdu medium of teaching. Latur is known for its Latur Pattern which has given toppers to the state for many years in HSC and SSC exams conducted by MSBSHSE.

== Divisions ==
The Latur District comprises five subdivisions, which are further divided into ten talukas. These five subdivisions are as follows:

- Latur
- Nilanga
- Udgir
- Ausa-Renapur
- Ahmedpur

Latur City is the administrative headquarters of the district. There are 948 villages in the district.

There are two Vidhan Sabha constituencies in the Latur District. These are Latur City and Latur Rural . The district votes in one Lok Sabha constituency Latur for the other three Latur city, Latur Rural.

== Cities and towns ==
Latur City is only a municipal corporation and Udgir city Municipal corporation in the district Ausa, Nilanga are the major urban centers in the district and all have Municipal Councils. The following are the 14 largest villages, administered by gram panchayats, followed by their 2011 population:

- Murud 25,978
- Chakur 16,122
- Killari 15,259
- Nalegaon 14,983
- Aurad Shahajani 12,894
- Renapur 11,596
- Deoni 11,276
- Pangaon 10,521
- Kingaon 9,665
- Shirur Tajband 9,191
- Shirur Anantpal 8,682
- Kasarshirshi 8,139
- Wadhawana 8,132
- Jalkot 7,912
- Wadwal Nagnath 7,289
- Sakol 7,018
- Hadolti 7,013
- Ujani 6,434
- Matola 6,393
- Kharola 6,260
- Babhalgaon 7,353
- Bhada 5,938
- Halgara 5,844
- Handarguli 5,801
- Chapoli 5,778
- Nitoor 5,751
- Lohara 5,682
- Chincholi Ballalnath 5,053

== Places of interest ==
- Ausa Fort: This fort is situated in a depression surrounded by high ground on all the sides, so that from its highest point one can have a view of approaching armies, even at a great distance, while the main parts of the fort remain hidden. Almost square in shape, the fort is surrounded by a moat or khandak (ditch), nearly 36.58 metres (120.0 ft) in width, now nearly dry.
- Kharosa Caves: Is a small village situated at 45 kilometres (45,000 m) from Latur City. The sculptures in the cave include Buddha, Narsimha, Shiv Parvati, Kartikeya, and Ravan among many others. According to the historians these caves were built in the sixth century during the Gupta period. The temple "Renuka Devi Mandir", and mosque "Pirpasha Darga" are also situated around the caves.
- Sai Nandanwan: Another tourist spot near Chakur. Spread into nearly 400 acres (1.6 km^{2}), it has mango plantations, water park and amusement park. A temple of Satya Sai Baba is situated in the middle of the park.
- Dongraj: A village in Chakur tehsil known for Malleppa temple of lord Shiva situated at border of five villages. The pilgrimage at Dongraj is organised at Malleppa Temple during shravani months and temple of sant Ambadas Maharaj. Various sports tournaments are organised during pilgrimage.
- Shri Keshav Balaji Devasthan Ausa : A Hindu Mandir near Ausa city placed on Yakatpur Road. It is created on the basis of Balaji Mandir Tirupati. This Temple & some Surrounding area is a private property but every devotee can go there for Darshan or Tourisms. It is the second most attractive place in Ausa City after 'The Ausa Fort'. Accommodation Facility is available near the temple.

== Economy ==
Latur became an important trading hub during the time of Nizams of Hyderabad. It is an industrial center as well as an agriculture-based district. Latur has become the rising Industrial Hub Of Marathwada.

Latur is known for its production of various pulses such as Pigeon pea. It is also a major trading center for Urad, Moong and Channa along with Toor. It is also known for trading in oil seeds, including sunflower, soya bean, and kardi (safflower).

It is also home to several sugar mills such as Manjra Sugar Industries Private Limited and Vikas Sahakari Sakhar Karkhana Ltd.

The GDVA Per Capita (At Current Price) of Latur district was ₹1,34,634 in 2019–2020. This is an increase from the previous number of ₹1,23,044.

== Transport ==
=== Air ===
Latur Airport is located between Akharwai and Harangul Bk., northwest of Latur City. The airport was constructed in 1991 by Public Works Department (PWD) and then handed over to MIDC. It was upgraded at a cost of nearly ₹140 million and is being operated on a 99-year lease by Reliance Airport Developers (RADPL). There is no scheduled air service currently from Latur Airport, although the airport sees 14 to 16 aircraft movements a month.

=== Highways ===
Several National & State Highways cross Latur district. They include:

- Tuljapur-Ausa- Latur-Ahmadpur- Nanded-Yavatmal-Wardha-Nagpur NH 361
- Mantha, Deogoan Fata, Selu, Pathari, Sonpeth, Parali Vaijnath, Ambajogai, Renapurphata, Latur(NH361), Ausa, Omarga, Yenegur, Murum, Alur, Akkalkot, Nagasur, NH52 near Bijapur (Vijapur) 548B
- Talegaon Dabhade, Chakan, Shikrapur, Nhavare, Srigonda, Jalgaon, Jamkhed, Patoda, Manjarsumba, Kaij, Ambajogai, Kingaon, NH361 near Chakur 548D
- Jintur, Bori, Zari, Parbhani, Gangakhed, Isad, Kingaon, Dhanora, Wadval, Nagnath, Gharani, Nalegoan, Nitur, Nilanga, Sirshi, Aurad Shajani, NH50 near Bhalki 752K
- Barshi, Yedshi, Dhoki, Murud, Latur, Renapur, Nalegaon, Dighoi, Udgir, Deglur, Adampur, Khatgoan, Sagroli, bodhan Nizamabad, Metpalli, Mancheral,

Chinnur, Sironcha, Bijapur, Jagdalpur, Kotapad, NH26 near Boriguma NH 63

- Parali Vaijnath, Dharmapuri, Pangaon, Renapur Phata NH 361H
- Nanded- Osmannagar-Kandhar- Jalkot- Udgir- Bidar
- Latur- Nitur- Nilanga- Aurad Shahajani- Zaheerabad
- Daund—Barsi—Osmanabad—Bantal—Ausa State Highway (SH 77)
- Manjarsumba—Kaij—Lokhandi—Savargaon State Highway.

=== Buses ===
Bus routes to the district headquarters connect 96% of the villages.

The municipal bus system operates buses that serve the region and connect places in Latur City. The State Transport buses of Maharashtra State Road Transport Corporation (MSRTC) serves all villages in the district.

=== Railway Lines ===
All railway lines through Latur are broad gauge. They belong to Central Railway

Latur railway station was built again when the Barshi railway line was converted from narrow gauge to broad gauge. The railway gauge was converted in September 2007 from Latur to Osmanabad and in October 2008 from Osmanabad to Kurduvadi. Latur is now connected to Mumbai by a direct train via Kurduvadi (train number 1006 from Latur and 1005 from Mumbai). It is connected to Hyderabad by train number 7013 that originates at Osmanabad. With the introduction of train number 1005 via Kurduvadi in October 2008, the earlier train connecting Latur to Latur Road, Parbhani and Aurangabad was discontinued.

The important railway stations are Latur, Latur Road and Udgir. The district has 148 km of broad gauge railway line.

Once a narrow-gauge line, the route connecting Latur, Kurduwadi, and Miraj underwent broad-gauge conversion between 2002 and 2008, re-routing through Osmanabad along the way. Completing the Pandharpur–Miraj segment remains a high priority, as direct rail access to Goa and the Konkan coast will significantly strengthen the regional economy.

== Sports ==
The Maharashtra Cricket Association is planning to construct their home ground near Latur City. Also a Divisional sports complex have been sanctioned for Latur region, which would cater to the needs of players in Latur, Osmanabad and Nanded districts.

National Level Kabaddi and Basket Ball were held in Latur district. Latur Region is still awaiting to get a Krida Prabodhini.

== Medical Facilities ==
Latur District is served by 12 government hospitals, 46 Primary Health Centers, 19 dispensaries and 234 primary health support groups. A Super Specialty Hospital is taking place in Latur which would benefit to the patients in 11 adjoining districts. In addition to these there are a large number of private hospitals as well.

Along with that, Latur has two medical colleges namely "Government Medical College and Hospital", and "MIMSR Medical College & Hospital", the latter of which is privately owned.

== Media and Communication ==
Post office: According to 1991 census, only 250 villages of total 914 had post offices, serving 52.27% of the rural population.

== Latur Earthquake of 1993 ==
Latur had a devastating, though only low magnitude, earthquake on 30 September 1993 resulting in a huge loss of life. The earthquake measured only 6.3 on the Richter scale but more than 30,000 people were estimated to have died mainly due to poor construction of houses and village huts made of stones which just collapsed on people who were fast asleep in early morning hours. It struck southern Marathwada region of Maharashtra state in central-western part of India and affected Latur, Beed, Osmanabad and adjoining districts about 400 km south-east of Mumbai (Bombay). It was an intra-plate earthquake. Latur was almost completely destroyed and life came to a standstill. The earthquake's focus was around 12 km deep - relatively shallow causing shock waves to cause more damage. The number of lives lost was high as the earthquake occurred at 3.56 a.m. local time when people were fast asleep.

After the earthquake, seismic zones were reclassified and building codes and standards were revised all over India.

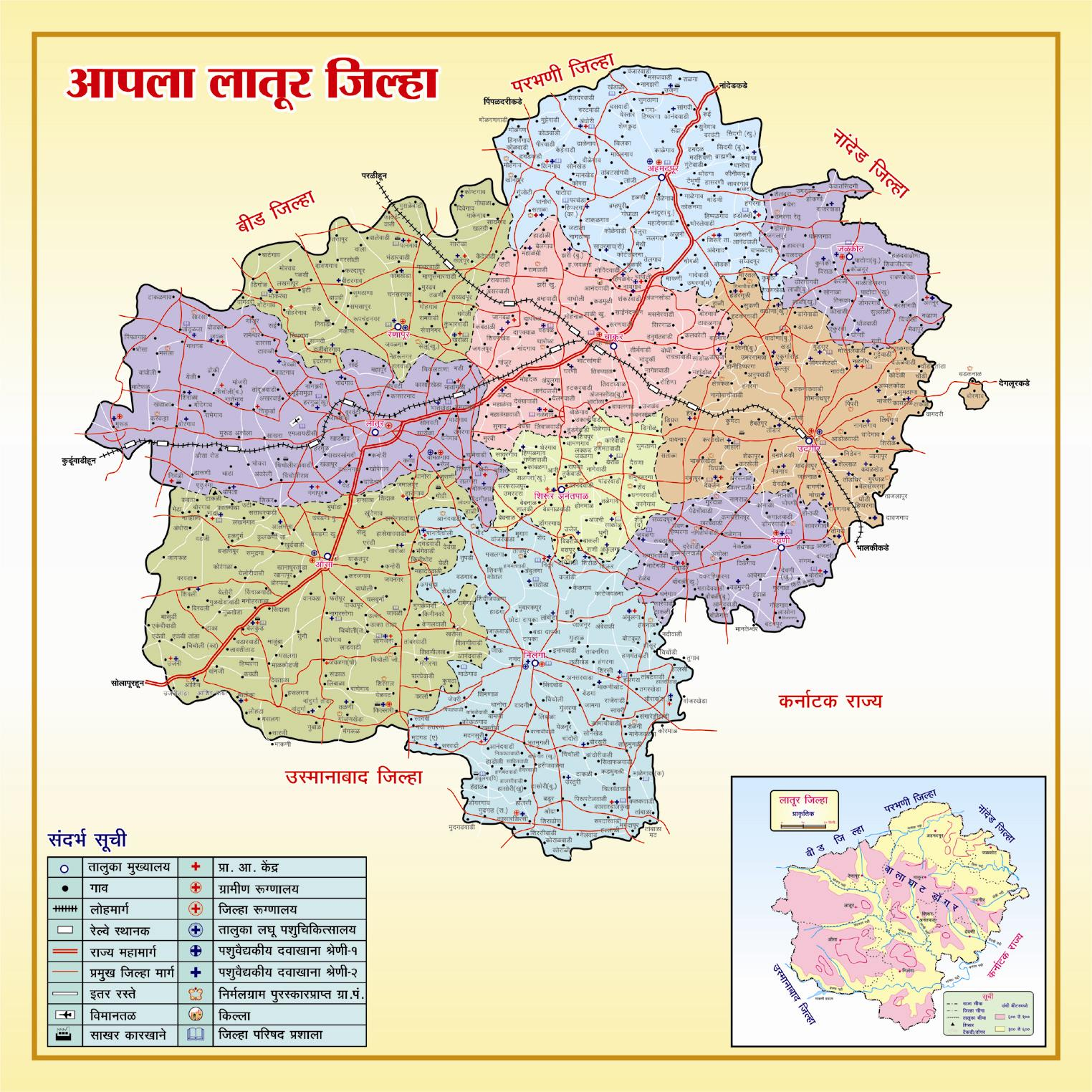
Latur District political map

== See also ==
- Make in Maharashtra
- Marathwada
- List of people from Latur
