= List of talukas of Maharashtra =

The table below lists all the talukas (tahsils/tehsils) of all the thirty-six districts in the Indian state of Maharashtra, along with district-subdivision and urban status information of headquarters villages/towns, as all talukas are intermediate level panchayats between the zilla parishad (district councils) at the district level and gram panchayats (village councils) at the lower level.

== Table ==
District	District subdivision	Taluka	Headquarters type
Sindhudurg district	Kankavli	Kankavli	
Sindhudurg district	Kankavli	Vaibhavwadi	
Sindhudurg district	Kankavli	Devgad	
Sindhudurg district	Kankavli	Malwan	
Sindhudurg district	Sawantwadi	Sawantwadi	
Sindhudurg district	Sawantwadi	Kudal	
Sindhudurg district	Sawantwadi	Vengurla	
Sindhudurg district	Sawantwadi	Dodamarg	
Ratnagiri district	Ratnagiri	Ratnagiri	
Ratnagiri district	Ratnagiri	Sangameshwar	
Ratnagiri district	Ratnagiri	Lanja	
Ratnagiri district	Ratnagiri	Rajapur	
Ratnagiri district	Chiplun	Chiplun	
Ratnagiri district	Chiplun	Guhagar	
Ratnagiri district	Chiplun	Dapoli	
Ratnagiri district	Chiplun	Mandangad	
Ratnagiri district	Chiplun	Khed	
Raigad district	Alibaug	Pen	
Raigad district	Alibaug	Alibag	
Raigad district	Alibaug	Murud	
Raigad district	Panvel	Panvel	Municipal corporation
Raigad district	Panvel	Uran	
Raigad district	Karjat	Karjat	
Raigad district	Karjat	Khalapur	
Raigad district	Mangaon	Mangaon	
Raigad district	Mangaon	Tala	
Raigad district	Mangaon	Roha	
Raigad district	Mangaon	Sudhagad-Pali	
Raigad district	Mahad	Mahad	
Raigad district	Mahad	Poladpur	
Raigad district	Mahad	Shrivardhan	
Raigad district	Mahad	Mhasala	
Mumbai City District			Municipal corporation
Mumbai Suburban District	Bandra	Kurla	Municipal corporation
Mumbai Suburban District	Bandra	Andheri	Municipal corporation
Mumbai Suburban District	Bandra	Borivali	Municipal corporation
Thane district	Thane	Thane	Municipal corporation
Thane district	Thane	Kalyan	Municipal corporation
Thane district	Thane	Murbad	
Thane district	Bhiwandi	Shahapur	
Thane district	Bhiwandi	Bhiwandi	Municipal corporation
Thane district	Ulhasnagar	Ulhasnagar	Municipal corporation
Thane district	Ulhasnagar	Ambarnath	
Palghar district	Palghar	Palghar	
Palghar district	Palghar	Vasai	Municipal corporation
Palghar district	Palghar	Dahanu	
Palghar district	Palghar	Talasari	
Palghar district	Jawhar	Jawhar	
Palghar district	Jawhar	Mokhada	
Palghar district	Jawhar	Vada	
Palghar district	Jawhar	Vikramgad	
Nashik District	Nashik	Nashik	Municipal corporation
Nashik District	Nashik	Igatpuri	
Nashik District	Nashik	Dindori	
Nashik District	Nashik	Peth	
Nashik District	Nashik	Trimbakeshwar	
Nashik District	Kalwan	Kalwan	
Nashik District	Kalwan	Deola	
Nashik District	Kalwan	Surgana	
Nashik District	Kalwan	Baglan	Municipal council
Nashik District	Malegaon	Malegaon	Municipal corporation
Nashik District	Malegaon	Nandgaon	
Nashik District	Malegaon	Chandwad	
Nashik District	Niphad	Niphad	
Nashik District	Niphad	Sinnar	
Nashik District	Niphad	Yeola	
Nandurbar district	Nandurbar	Nandurbar	Municipal corporation
Nandurbar district	Nandurbar	Navapur	Municipal council
Nandurbar district	Nandurbar	Shahada	Municipal council
Nandurbar district	Talode	Talode	
Nandurbar district	Talode	Akkalkuwa	
Nandurbar district	Talode	Dhadgaon	
Dhule district	Dhule	Dhule	Municipal corporation
Dhule district	Dhule	Sakri	
Dhule district	Sindkheda	Sindkheda	
Dhule district	Sindkheda	Shirpur	Municipal council
Jalgaon district	Jalgaon	Jalgaon	Municipal corporation
Jalgaon district	Jalgaon	Jamner	
Jalgaon district	Jalgaon	Erandol	
Jalgaon district	Jalgaon	Dharangaon	
Jalgaon district	Bhusawal	Bhusawal	
Jalgaon district	Bhusawal	Raver	Municipal council
Jalgaon district	Bhusawal	Muktainagar	Municipal council
Jalgaon district	Bhusawal	Bodwad	Municipal council
Jalgaon district	Bhusawal	Yawal	Municipal council
Jalgaon district	Amalner	Amalner	Municipal council
Jalgaon district	Amalner	Parola	Municipal council
Jalgaon district	Amalner	Chopda	Municipal council
Jalgaon district	Pachora	Pachora	Municipal council
Jalgaon district	Pachora	Bhadgaon	Municipal council
Jalgaon district	Pachora	Chalisgaon	Municipal council
Buldhana district	Buldhana	Buldhana	Municipal council
Buldhana district	Buldhana	Chikhli	Municipal council
Buldhana district	Buldhana	Deulgaon Raja	Municipal council
Buldhana district	Jalgaon Jamod	Jalgaon Jamod	Municipal council
Buldhana district	Jalgaon Jamod	Sangrampur	Municipal council
Buldhana district	Malkapur	Malkapur	Municipal council
Buldhana district	Malkapur	Motala	Municipal council
Buldhana district	Malkapur	Nandura	Municipal council
Buldhana district	Khamgaon	Khamgaon	Municipal council
Buldhana district	Khamgaon	Shegaon	Municipal council
Buldhana district	Mehkar	Mehkar	Municipal council
Buldhana district	Mehkar	Sindkhed Raja	Municipal council
Buldhana district	Mehkar	Lonar	Municipal council
Akola district	Akola	Akola	Municipal corporation
Akola district	Akot	Akot	Municipal council
Akola district	Akot	Telhara	Municipal council
Akola district	Balapur	Balapur	Municipal council
Akola district	Balapur	Patur	Municipal council
Akola district	Murtajapur	Murtajapur	Municipal council
Akola district	Murtajapur	Barshitakli	Municipal council
Washim district	Washim	Washim	Municipal council
Washim district	Washim	Malegaon	Municipal council
Washim district	Washim	Risod	Municipal council
Washim district	Mangrulpir	Mangrulpir	Municipal council
Washim district	Mangrulpir	Karanja	Municipal council
Washim district	Mangrulpir	Manora	Municipal council
Amravati district	Amravati	Amravati	Municipal corporation
Amravati district	Amravati	Bhatkuli	Municipal council
Amravati district	Amravati	Nandgaon Khandeshwar	Municipal council
Amravati district	Dharni	Dharni	Municipal council
Amravati district	Dharni	Chikhaldara	Municipal council
Amravati district	Achalpur	Achalpur	Municipal council
Amravati district	Achalpur	Chandurbazar	Municipal council
Amravati district	Morshi	Morshi	Municipal council
Amravati district	Morshi	Warud	Municipal council
Amravati district	Daryapur	Daryapur	Municipal council
Amravati district	Daryapur	Anjangaon-Surji	Municipal council
Amravati district	Chandur	Chandur	Municipal council
Amravati district	Chandur	Dhamangaon	Municipal council
Amravati district	Chandur	Tiosa	Municipal council
Wardha district	Wardha	Wardha	Municipal council
Wardha district	Wardha	Deoli	Municipal council
Wardha district	Wardha	Seloo	Municipal council
Wardha district	Arvi	Arvi	Municipal council
Wardha district	Arvi	Ashti	Municipal council
Wardha district	Arvi	Karanja	Municipal council
Wardha district	Hinganghat	Hinganghat	Municipal council
Wardha district	Hinganghat	Samudrapur	Municipal council
Nagpur district	Nagpur	Nagpur Urban	Municipal corporation
Nagpur district	Nagpur	Nagpur Rural	Municipal corporation
Nagpur district	Nagpur	Kamptee	
Nagpur district	Nagpur	Hingna	Municipal council
Nagpur district	Katol	Katol	
Nagpur district	Katol	Narkhed	Municipal council
Nagpur district	Savner	Savner	Municipal council
Nagpur district	Savner	Kalameshwar	Municipal council
Nagpur district	Ramtek	Ramtek	Municipal council
Nagpur district	Ramtek	Mouda	Municipal council
Nagpur district	Ramtek	Parseoni	Municipal council
Nagpur district	Umred	Umred	Municipal council
Nagpur district	Umred	Kuhi	Municipal council
Nagpur district	Umred	Bhiwapur	Municipal council
Bhandara district	Bhandara	Bhandara	Municipal council
Bhandara district	Bhandara	Tumsar	Municipal council
Bhandara district	Bhandara	Pauni	Municipal council
Bhandara district	Bhandara	Mohadi	Municipal council
Bhandara district	Sakoli	Sakoli	Municipal council
Bhandara district	Sakoli	Lakhani	Municipal council
Bhandara district	Sakoli	Lakhandur	Municipal council
Gondia district	Gondia	Gondia	Municipal council
Gondia district	Gondia	Goregaon	Municipal council
Gondia district	Gondia	Salekasa	Municipal council
Gondia district	Tiroda	Tiroda	Municipal council
Gondia district	Deori	Amgaon	Municipal council
Gondia district	Deori	Deori	Municipal council
Gondia district	Arjuni Morgaon	Arjuni-Morgaon	Municipal council
Gondia district	Arjuni Morgaon	Sadak-Arjuni	Municipal council
Gadchiroli district	Gadchiroli	Gadchiroli	Municipal council
Gadchiroli district	Gadchiroli	Dhanora	
Gadchiroli district	Gadchiroli	Chamorshi	
Gadchiroli district	Gadchiroli	Mulchera	
Gadchiroli district	Desaiganj	Desaiganj	Municipal council
Gadchiroli district	Desaiganj	Armori	Municipal council
Gadchiroli district	Desaiganj	Kurkheda	
Gadchiroli district	Desaiganj	Korchi	
Gadchiroli district	Aheri	Aheri	
Gadchiroli district	Aheri	Etapalli	
Gadchiroli district	Aheri	Bhamragad	
Gadchiroli district	Aheri	Sironcha	
Chandrapur district	Chandrapur	Chandrapur	Municipal corporation
Chandrapur district	Chandrapur	Saoli	Municipal council
Chandrapur district	Chandrapur	Mul	Municipal council
Chandrapur district	Chandrapur	Ballarpur	Municipal council
Chandrapur district	Chandrapur	Pombhurna	Municipal council
Chandrapur district	Chandrapur	Gondpimpri	Municipal council
Chandrapur district	Warora	Warora	Municipal council
Chandrapur district	Warora	Chimur	Municipal council
Chandrapur district	Warora	Bhadravati	Municipal council
Chandrapur district	Bramhapuri	Bramhapuri	Municipal council
Chandrapur district	Bramhapuri	Nagbhid	Municipal council
Chandrapur district	Bramhapuri	Sindewahi	Municipal council
Chandrapur district	Rajura	Rajura	Municipal council
Chandrapur district	Rajura	Korpana	Municipal council
Chandrapur district	Rajura	Jiwati	Municipal council
Yavatmal district	Yavatmal	Yavatmal	Municipal council
Yavatmal district	Yavatmal	Arni	Municipal council
Yavatmal district	Yavatmal	Babhulgaon	Municipal council
Yavatmal district	Yavatmal	Kalamb	Municipal council
Yavatmal district	Darwha	Darwha	Municipal council
Yavatmal district	Darwha	Digras	Municipal council
Yavatmal district	Darwha	Ner	Municipal council
Yavatmal district	Pusad	Pusad	Municipal council
Yavatmal district	Pusad	Umarkhed	Municipal council
Yavatmal district	Pusad	Mahagaon	Municipal council
Yavatmal district	Kelapur	Kelapur	Municipal council
Yavatmal district	Kelapur	Ralegaon	Municipal council
Yavatmal district	Kelapur	Ghatanji	Municipal council
Yavatmal district	Wani	Wani	Municipal council
Yavatmal district	Wani	Maregaon	Municipal council
Yavatmal district	Wani	Zari Jamani	Municipal council
Nanded district	Nanded	Nanded	Municipal corporation
Nanded district	Nanded	Ardhapur	Municipal council
Nanded district	Nanded	Mudkhed	Municipal council
Nanded district	Nanded	Bhokar	Municipal council
Nanded district	Nanded	Umri	Municipal council
Nanded district	Nanded	Loha	Municipal council
Nanded district	Nanded	Kandhar	Municipal council
Nanded district	Kinwat	Kinwat	Municipal council
Nanded district	Kinwat	Himayatnagar	Municipal council
Nanded district	Kinwat	Hadgaon	Municipal council
Nanded district	Kinwat	Mahur	Municipal council
Nanded district	Deglur	Deglur	Municipal council
Nanded district	Deglur	Mukhed	Municipal council
Nanded district	Deglur	Dharmabad	Municipal council
Nanded district	Deglur	Biloli	Municipal council
Nanded district	Deglur	Naigaon	Municipal council
Hingoli district	Hingoli	Hingoli	Municipal council
Hingoli district	Hingoli	Sengaon	Municipal council
Hingoli district	Hingoli	Kalamnuri	Municipal council
Hingoli district	Basmath	Basmath	Municipal council
Hingoli district	Basmath	Aundha Nagnath	Municipal council
Parbhani district	Parbhani	Parbhani	Municipal corporation
Parbhani district	Parbhani	Sonpeth	Municipal council
Parbhani district	Parbhani	Gangakhed	Municipal council
Parbhani district	Parbhani	Palam	Municipal council
Parbhani district	Parbhani	Purna	Municipal council
Parbhani district	Sailu	Sailu	Municipal council
Parbhani district	Sailu	Jintur	Municipal council
Parbhani district	Sailu	Manwath	Municipal council
Parbhani district	Sailu	Pathri	Municipal council
Jalna district	Jalna	Jalna	Municipal corporation
Jalna district	Jalna	Bhokardan	Municipal council
Jalna district	Jalna	Jafrabad	Municipal council
Jalna district	Jalna	Badnapur	Municipal council
Jalna district	Partur	Ambad	Municipal council
Jalna district	Partur	Ghansawangi	Municipal council
Jalna district	Partur	Partur	Municipal council
Jalna district	Partur	Mantha	Municipal council
Aurangabad district	Aurangabad	Aurangabad	Municipal corporation
Aurangabad district	Aurangabad	Kannad	Municipal council
Aurangabad district	Aurangabad	Soegaon	Municipal council
Aurangabad district	Sillod	Sillod	Municipal council
Aurangabad district	Sillod	Phulambri	Municipal council
Aurangabad district	Sillod	Khuldabad	Municipal council
Aurangabad district	Vaijapur	Vaijapur	Municipal council
Aurangabad district	Vaijapur	Gangapur	Municipal council
Aurangabad district	Vaijapur	Paithan	Municipal council
Beed district	Beed	Beed	Municipal council
Beed district	Beed	Georai	Municipal council
Beed district	Patoda	Patoda	Municipal council
Beed district	Patoda	Shirur-Kasar	Municipal council
Beed district	Patoda	Ashti	Municipal council
Beed district	Ambejogai	Majalgaon	Municipal council
Beed district	Ambejogai	Wadwani	Municipal council
Beed district	Ambejogai	Kaij	Municipal council
Beed district	Ambejogai	Dharur	Municipal council
Beed district	Ambejogai	Parli	Municipal council
Beed district	Ambejogai	Ambajogai	Municipal council
Latur district	Latur	Latur	Municipal corporation
Latur district	Ausa-Renapur	Renapur	Gram panchayat
Latur district	Ausa-Renapur	Ausa	Municipal council
Latur district	Ahmedpur	Ahmedpur	Municipal council
Latur district	Ahmedpur	Jalkot	Gram panchayat
Latur district	Ahmedpur	Chakur	Gram panchayat
Latur district	Ahmedpur	Shirur Anantpal	Gram panchayat
Latur district	Nilanga	Nilanga	Municipal council
Latur district	Nilanga	Deoni	Gram panchayat
Latur district	Udgir	Udgir	Municipal council
Osmanabad	Osmanabad	Osmanabad	Municipal council
Osmanabad	Osmanabad	Tuljapur	Municipal council
Osmanabad	Bhum	Bhum	Municipal council
Osmanabad	Bhum	Paranda	Municipal council
Osmanabad	Kalamb	Washi	Municipal council
Osmanabad	Kalamb	Kalamb	Municipal council
Osmanabad	Umarga	Lohara	Municipal council
Osmanabad	Umarga	Umarga	Municipal council
Solapur district	Solapur North	Barshi	Municipal council
Solapur district	Solapur North	Solapur North	Municipal corporation
Solapur district	Solapur South	Solapur South	Municipal corporation
Solapur district	Solapur South	Akkalkot	Municipal council
Solapur district	Kurduwadi	Madha	Municipal council
Solapur district	Kurduwadi	Karmala	Municipal council
Solapur district	Pandharpur	Pandharpur	Municipal council
Solapur district	Pandharpur	Mohol	Municipal council
Solapur district	Malshiras	Malshiras	Municipal council
Solapur district	Mangalvedhe	Sangole	Municipal council
Solapur district	Mangalvedhe	Mangalvedhe	Municipal council
Ahmednagar district	Ahmednagar	Nagar	Municipal corporation
Ahmednagar district	Ahmednagar	Shevgaon	Municipal council
Ahmednagar district	Ahmednagar	Pathardi	Municipal council
Ahmednagar district	Ahmednagar	Parner	Municipal council
Ahmednagar district	Sangamner	Sangamner	Municipal council
Ahmednagar district	Sangamner	Kopargaon	Municipal council
Ahmednagar district	Sangamner	Akole	Municipal council
Ahmednagar district	Shrirampur	Shrirampur	Municipal council
Ahmednagar district	Shrirampur	Nevasa	Municipal council
Ahmednagar district	Shrirampur	Rahata	Municipal council
Ahmednagar district	Shrirampur	Rahuri	Municipal council
Ahmednagar district	Karjat	Shrigonda	Municipal council
Ahmednagar district	Karjat	Karjat	Municipal council
Ahmednagar district	Karjat	Jamkhed	Municipal council
Pune district	Haveli	Pune City	Municipal corporation
Pune district	Haveli	Haveli	Municipal council
Pune district	Khed	Khed	Municipal council
Pune district	Khed	Junnar	Municipal council
Pune district	Khed	Ambegaon	Municipal council
Pune district	Maval	Maval	Municipal council
Pune district	Maval	Mulshi	Municipal council
Pune district	Maval	Shirur	Municipal council
Pune district	Bhor	Purandhar (Saswad)	Municipal council
Pune district	Bhor	Velhe	Municipal council
Pune district	Bhor	Bhor	Municipal council
Pune district	Baramati	Baramati	Municipal council
Pune district	Baramati	Indapur	Municipal council
Pune district	Baramati	Daund	Municipal council
Satara district	Satara	Satara	Municipal council
Satara district	Satara	Jaoli	Municipal council
Satara district	Satara	Koregaon	Municipal council
Satara district	Wai	Wai	Municipal council
Satara district	Wai	Mahabaleshwar	Municipal council
Satara district	Wai	Khandala	Municipal council
Satara district	Phaltan	Phaltan	Municipal council
Satara district	Phaltan	Maan	Municipal council
Satara district	Phaltan	Khatav	Municipal council
Satara district	Karad	Patan	Municipal council
Satara district	Karad	Karad	Municipal council
Sangli district	Miraj	Miraj	Municipal corporation
Sangli district	Miraj	Kavathemahankal	Town council
Sangli district	Miraj	Tasgaon	Town council
Sangli district	Miraj	Jat	Municipal council
Sangli district	Walwa	Walwa	Municipal council
Sangli district	Walwa	Shirala	Town council
Sangli district	Khanapur	Khanapur (Vita)	Municipal council
Sangli district	Khanapur	Atpadi	Town council
Sangli district	Khanapur	Palus	Town council
Sangli district	Khanapur	Kadegaon	Town council
Kolhapur district	Karvir	Karvir	Municipal corporation
Kolhapur district	Karvir	Panhala	Municipal council
Kolhapur district	Karvir	Shahuwadi	Municipal council
Kolhapur district	Karvir	Kagal	Municipal council
Kolhapur district	Ichalkaranji	Hatkanangale	Municipal council
Kolhapur district	Ichalkaranji	Shirol	Municipal council
Kolhapur district	Radhanagari	Radhanagari	Town council
Kolhapur district	Radhanagari	Gaganbawada	Town council
Kolhapur district	Radhanagari	Bhudargad	Town council
Kolhapur district	Gadhinglaj	Gadhinglaj	Municipal council
Kolhapur district	Gadhinglaj	Chandgad	Town council
Kolhapur district	Gadhinglaj	Ajra	Town council
