= Umri =

Umri may refer to several places:

== Honorary Title ==
The students graduated from the largest Islamic institution in South India Jamia Darussalam Acquire the title Umri(Oomeri)

== India ==
- Umri, Bijnor, a village in Bijnor district, Uttar Pradesh
- Umri, Jalaun, a town and nagar panchayat in Jalaun district, Uttar Pradesh
- Umri, Kurukshetra, a village in Haryana
- Umri Kalan, a town in Moradabad district, Uttar Pradesh
- Umri, Nanded, a city in Nanded subdivision, Nanded district, Maharashtra
- Umri taluka, taluka (after its above seat) in Nanded district, Maharashtra
- Umri Pragane Balapur, a census town in Akola district, Maharashtra
- Mohammadpur Umri, a village near Indian Air Force base of Bamrauli, Uttar Pradesh
- Peth Umri, a city and a municipal council in Nanded district, Maharashtra

== Elsewhere ==
- Umri (Omri), village in Iran
