= Biloli taluka =

Biloli taluka is a taluka in Nanded district of Maharashtra an Indian state. The headquarters of the taluka is the town of Biloli.

== Nanded district ==
There were 16 talukas in Nanded district as in November, 2014, viz. Nanded, Ardhapur, Bhokar, Biloli, Deglur, Dharmabad, Hadgaon, Himayatnagar, Kandhar, Kinwat, Loha, Mahur, Mudkhed, Mukhed, Naigaon, and Umri. In 1981, there were eight talukas in the district, viz. Nanded, Hadgaon, Kinwat, Bhokar, Biloli, Deglur (Degloor), Mukhed and Kandhar.
