= Naigaon, Nanded =

Naigaon
- Town
- Location in Maharashtra, India
- Coordinates: 18°50′47″N 77°31′50″E
- Country: India
- State: Maharashtra
- District: Nanded district

Government
  - Type: Nagar Panchayat
  - Body: Naigaon Nagar Panchayat
- Elevation: 358 m (1,175 ft)

Population (2011)
  - Total: 22,208
- Demonym: Naigaonkar

Language
  - Official: Marathi
- Time zone: UTC+5:30 (IST)
- Postal code: 431709
- Telephone code: 02465
- Vehicle registration: MH-26

Naigaon is a town and taluka in Nanded district of Maharashtra state in India. Naigaon (Bz.) is located 41.2 km south of the district headquarters city of Nanded and 60 km west from neighboring city of Nizamabad in Telangana State. Naigaon lies on MSH - 6 (Akola - Hyderabad). It is approximately 600 km from the State capital Mumbai. It is the Center of Naigaon Taluka. Naigaon is one of the rapidly growing towns in the Nanded District. The economy is primarily based on agriculture and related business.

The town is well connected by road with its district headquarters Nanded and other cities such as Nizamabad, Hyderabad of Telangana State, Nagpur, Aurangabad and Akola of Maharashtra State and Bidar of Karnataka State. It is also connected to adjacent talukas like Degloor, Mukhed, Biloli.

== Demographics ==
As of 2011 Census, Naigaon had a total population of 16,719 individuals of which 8,512 were males and 8,207 were females. The population of children in the age range 0 to 6 years was 2,072. The Scheduled Castes and Scheduled Tribes population was 3,784 and 780 respectively. the average literacy rate was 72.12% of which males were 78.45% and females were 65.55% literate. The sex ratio was 964. There were 3323 households in Naigaon as of 2011.
