= Sardarwadi =

Village in Maharashtra

- village
- Sardarwadi Location Map, Maharashtra India Sardarwadi (India)
- Coordinates: 18°06′58″N 76°45′09″E
- Country: India
- State: Maharashtra
- District: Latur
- Taluka: Nilanga

Languages
  - Official: Marathi and English
  - Other: Hindi and Kannada
- Time zone: UTC+5:30 (IST)
- PIN: 413607

Sardarwadi is a village in Nilanga tehsil, Latur district of Maharashtra, India. It is a small village with a population of around 500 to 600 people. It is near Kasar Balkunda, around 10 kilometers from Basavakalyan in the Bidar District. It belongs to the Marathwada region. It belongs to the Aurangabad Division. It is located 42 km towards South from District headquarters Latur and 494 km from the State capital Mumbai. Sardarwadi Pin code is 413607 and postal head office is Kasarsirsi.

== History ==
Before the formation of Latur district, Sardarwadi was the part of Bidar district, But it belonged to the Nilanga Tehsil. The Nilanga Tehsil was in Bidar District. After the formation of new Latur district On 15 August 1982, it became part of the Latur District.

== History of Sardarwadi ==
During the Nizam rule this village was adopted by Nizam Sardar. At that time it was a small place where only 5-6 houses were present and known as "Wadi". After the formation of Kasar Balkunda grampanchayat the name has changed to Sardarwadi because of adapting Saradwadi by the Nizam Sardar. The major families present in Sardarwadi are Sardarwadikar, More, Chapale and Patil.

There is no grampanchayat exist in this village. The grampanchayat is subordinated to Kasar Balkunda village which is near about 3 km away from village. Kasar Balkunda is a consolidated grampanchayat of 4-5 neighbour villages around it.

== Culture and festivals ==
Sardarwadi is located near the boundary of Karnataka, and thus one finds a combination of cultural influence from both Karnataka and Maharashtra. All the festivals celebrated in Karnataka are celebrated in this village. Every year people celebrate Granthaparayan for a week, with people gathering to sings hymns (Bhajans) and Kirtans. People have been celebrating traditional festivals like Diwali, Pola, Velamavasya, Ganeshotsava.

The traditional system of marriage ceremony is a combination of Maharashtra and Karnataka marriage system.

== Education ==
There is one Zilla Parishad school in Sardarwadi. Previously there was very few people was educated in this village. Now the rate of literacy is increased. Now people are giving value to education.

== Temples ==
There is one Hanuman temple in Sardarwadi at the entrance of the village. Besides the Hanuman temple there is one small Laxmi Temple. Every year people celebrate Akhand Harinam saptah for seven days with full devotion to the god. Many Sages and people from the all over Maharashtra contribute in that celebration.

== Demographics ==
The major languages spoken in the Sardarwadi are Marathi, Hindi, and Kannada. The official language used are Marathi and English. Before 1962 the official language was Urdu because this place was under the Hyderabad institution. The constituency of Sardarwadi is Ausa Vidhan sabha for MLA election and for MP belongs to Latur.

== Farming ==
Two types of soil are found here, Black Clay and Red Clay type soil.

The major crops are sorghum, tur, sugarcane, soybean, bajra, paddy, and corn.
