= Mahur taluka =

Nanded district

Mahur taluka is a taluka in Nanded district of Maharashtra an Indian state. Its headquarters are at Mahur.

== Demographics ==
Religions in Mahur taluk (2011)
Religion	Percent
Hinduism	80.22%
Islam	11.04%
Buddhism	7.61%
Other or not stated	1.13%

At the time of the 2011 census, Mahur taluk had 22,127 households and a population of 99,040. Mahur taluk had a sex ratio of 927 females per 1000 males and a literacy rate of 76.87%. 13,657 (13.79%) were under 6 years of age. Scheduled Castes and Scheduled Tribes made up 8.59% and 14.81% of the population respectively.

Languages of Mahur taluk (2011)
1. Marathi (43.7%)
2. Lambadi (34.6%)
3. Hindi (7.88%)
4. Gondi (6.61%)
5. Urdu (4.68%)
6. Telugu (1.41%)
7. Others (1.09%)

At the time of the 2011 census, 43.69% of the population spoke Marathi, 34.64% Lambadi, 7.88% Hindi, 6.61% Gondi, 4.68% Urdu and 1.41% Telugu as their first language.

== Part of Nanded district ==
Mahur is part of Kinwat taluka

- In 1981, there were eight talukas in the district, viz. Nanded, Hadgaon, Kinwat, Bhokar, Biloli, Deglur (Degloor), Mukhed and Kandhar.

In 1999, Mahur taluka is created, after bifurcate Kinwat Taluka.

- There were 16 talukas in Nanded district as in November 2014, viz. Nanded, Ardhapur, Bhokar, Biloli, Deglur, Dharmabad, Hadgaon, Himayatnagar, Kandhar, Kinwat, Loha, Mahur, Mudkhed, Mukhed, Naigaon, and Umri.
