= Hadgaon taluka =

Hadgaon
- Interactive map of Hadgaon
- Coordinates: 19.4956776°N 77.6243287°E
- Country: India
- State: Maharashtra
- District: Nanded district

The Hadgaon taluka or Hadgaon tehsil is a taluka in the Nanded district of the Indian state of Maharashtra. This tehsil includes one municipal council, Hadgaon, and 154 villages.

The Hadgaon taluka is attached to the Hingoli Lok Sabha constituency and is not included in the Nanded constituency..

== Economy ==
The economy is mainly agricultural. The taluka has neither an industry sector or service sector. The major crops are cotton, jowar, bajra, soybean, banana, and other crops such as vegetables and flowers. The organic wild custard apple is the major forest produce in the tribal belt. Other forest produce includes firewood, gum, and tendu leaf

Residents face severe unemployment, with 90% of the workers working in the agriculture sector as cultivators or laborers.

Important pilgrimage centers in the taluka are the Kedarnath temple at Kedarguda, the temple of Lord Datta and Renuka at Datta Bardi, in Hadgaon, the Jain temple near Hadgaon, the Mahadev mandir at Gaitond, and the Ganpati mandir at Hadgaon.

== Healthcare ==
The healthcare facilities are primarily government primary and community health centers. Health issues such as malnutrition, IMR, and MMR are common among some families. Superstitions such as a preference for treatment by the local Mantrik over doctors in the event of snake bites or dog bites are also popular among the residents.

== Education ==
A progressive education system is present in the taluk, with government schools, ashrams, and private schools being instituted. The 25% quota reserved for socially and economically backward classes in private education institutes under the Right to Education Act has been of help to the underprivileged sections of the taluk.

== Demographics ==
According to data from the 2001 census, the population is 259,986. The average sex ratio is 938. About 90% of the population is rural. The child sex ratio (for children between 0 and 6 years of age) for taluka is 910, which is below its average sex ratio. The literacy rate is 75.68%.

The Scheduled Caste population constitutes 21.7% of the total, and the Scheduled Tribe population constitutes 11.7% of the population of the taluka. Hindus constitute 76.8% of the population, Buddhists 15.96%, and Muslims 6.29%.

== Geography ==
There were 16 talukas in the Nanded district as of November 2014, namely, Nanded, Ardhapur, Bhokar, Biloli, Deglur, Dharmabad, Hadgaon, Himayatnagar, Kandhar, Kinwat, Loha, Mahur, Mudkhed, Mukhed, Naigaon, and Umri. In 1981, there were eight talukas in the district, which were Nanded, Hadgaon, Kinwat, Bhokar, Biloli, Deglur (Degloor), Mukhed and Kandhar.

== Notable people ==
- Vivek Ram Chaudhari, the incumbent Air chief marshal, is originally from the Hadgaon taluka.

== See also ==
- Hyderabad Samajik Sudhar Sangh
