= Sowali =

- Country: India
- State: Maharashtra
- District: Nanded

Languages
  - Official: Marathi
- Time zone: UTC+5:30 (IST)
- PIN: 431715

Sowali or Sawali is a village in the district of Nanded, in the taluka of Biloli in Maharashtra, India. It is located between the city of Biloli and the town of Bodhan.

It was once the seat of the Deshmukhs of Sowali, where it also housed their castle of which only one burj (Bastion) remains.
