= Durrani (surname) =

Durrani (Pashto: دراني) or Abdali (Pashto: ابدالی) is the name of a chief Sarbani Pashtun tribal confederation in Afghanistan and Pakistan. It is also a surname. Notable people with the surname include:

== Historical ==
- Ahmad Shah Durrani, founder of the Durrani Empire, which he ruled from 1747 to 1772
- Mahmud Shah Durrani, ruled the Durrani Empire from 1801 to 1803 and again from 1809 to 1818
- Ali Shah Durrani, ruled the Durrani Empire from 1818 to 1819
- Ayub Shah Durrani, ruled the Durrani Empire from 1819 to 1823
- Shah Shujah Durrani, ruled the Durrani Empire from 1803 to 1809
- Timur Shah Durrani, ruled the Durrani Empire from 1772 to 1793
- Zaman Shah Durrani, ruled the Durrani Empire from 1793 to 1800
- Shahzada Kamran Durrani, son of Mahmud Shah Durrani and an Emir of Afghanistan

== Sports ==
- Abdul Wahid Durrani, Pakistani international footballer
- Salim Durani, Indian cricketer
- Ahmed Shah Durrani (umpire) cricket umpire.

== Armed forces ==
- Abdur Rahim Durrani, retired Brigadier General of Pakistan Army who served as Governor of Baluchistan province of Pakistan from 1994 to 1995
- Asad Durrani, director-general of Pakistan's Inter-Services Intelligence from 1990 to 1992 and director-general of the Pakistani Army's Military Intelligence
- Hakeemullah Khan Durrani, Chief of Air Staff of Pakistan's Air Force from 1988 to 1991
- Mahmood Khan Durrani, British Indian Army Captain in Malaya during World War II, awarded the medal for heroism while a Prisoner of War of the Japanese Army
- Mahmud Ali Durrani, retired two-star rank general officer, author of security studies, and a former National Security Adviser to Pervez Musharraf, serving from 2008 to 2009
- Nasir Durrani, Inspector General of Police of Khyber Pakhtunkhwa from 2013 to 2017 and brought revolutionary changes in KP Chapter Police Department.

== Politicians ==
- Ayatullah Durrani, former Member of the National Assembly of Pakistan and former Minister of State for Industries and Production
- Asif Durrani, Ambassador of Pakistan to the United Arab Emirates
- Rahila Hameed Khan Durrani, Speaker of the Provincial Assembly of Balochistan since 24 December 2015

== Film industry ==
- Ejaz Durrani, Pakistani film actor, director and producer active from 1956 to 1984
- Ghulam Mustafa Durrani, Indian Radio Drama Artist, playback singer, actor and music director
- Iqbal Durrani, an Indian writer, director, actor and producer of Hindi films

== Others ==
- Hayatullah Khan Durrani, Pakistani cave explorer, mountaineer, environmentalist, organizer, and rescuer
- Hazeem Durrani, fictional character from the BBC soap opera Doctors
- Pashtana Durrani (born 1997), Afghan girls' education activist
- Shahkur Ullah Durrani, managing director of Pakistan International Airlines and Governor of the State Bank of Pakistan
- Momi Gul Durrani (1938–1965), Pakistani air hostess and model

== Authors ==
- Attash Durrani, Pakistani linguist, researcher, critic and author
- Mohammad Abubakar Durrani, Pakistani canoeist
- Tehmina Durrani, Pakistani women's rights activist and author

== See also ==
- Deoni, the Jagir where Deoni cattle breeding farm was initiated by the Durrani Brothers.
