= Ardhapur taluka =

Coordinates: 19.2874975°N 77.3546087°E

Ardhapur taluka is a taluka in Nanded district of Maharashtra an Indian state. It is a part of Nanded subdivision.

== Nanded district ==
Nanded district is divided into three subdivisions viz. Nanded subdivision, Deglur subdivision and Kinwat subdivisions. There were 16 talukas in Nanded district as of November, 2014, viz. Nanded, Ardhapur, Bhokar, Biloli, Deglur, Dharmabad, Hadgaon, Himayatnagar, Kandhar, Kinwat, Loha, Mahur, Mudkhed, Mukhed, Naigaon, and Umri. In 1981, there were eight talukas in the district, viz. Nanded, Hadgaon, Kinwat, Bhokar, Biloli, Deglur (Degloor), Mukhed and Kandhar. The talukas of Mahur, Himayatnagar, Umari, Dharmabad, Mudkhed, Loha, Ardhapur and Naigaon (Naygaon) were formed on 26 June 1999.
