= Kandhar taluka =

Kandhar taluka is a taluka in Nanded district of Maharashtra an Indian state.

== Nanded district ==
There were 16 talukas in Nanded district as of November 2014, viz. Nanded, Ardhapur, Bhokar, Biloli, Deglur, Dharmabad, Hadgaon, Himayatnagar, Kandhar, Kinwat, Loha, Mahur, Mudkhed, Mukhed, Naigaon, and Umri. In 1981, there were eight talukas in the district, viz. Nanded, Hadgaon, Kinwat, Bhokar, Biloli, Deglur (Degloor), Mukhed and Kandhar.
