= Mugat (village) =

Village in Mukhed taluka, Maharashtra, India

Coordinates: 19°09′04″N 77°25′53″E

Mugat is a village in Mukhed taluka in Nanded district of Maharashtra in India.
