= Umri taluka =

Umri taluka is a taluka in Nanded district of Maharashtra an Indian state.

== Nanded district ==
There were 16 talukas in Nanded district as of November, 2014: Nanded, Ardhapur, Bhokar, Biloli, Deglur, Dharmabad, Hadgaon, Himayatnagar, Kandhar, Kinwat, Loha, Mahur, Mudkhed, Mukhed, Naigaon, and Umri. In 1981, there were eight talukas in the district: Nanded, Hadgaon, Kinwat, Bhokar, Biloli, Deglur (Degloor), Mukhed and Kandhar.
