= Jamb, Nanded =

Village in Maharashtra

Jamb
- Village
- Location in Maharashtra Jamb (India)
- Coordinates: 18.65965°N 77.1866°E
- Country: India
- State: Maharashtra
- District: Nanded

Government
  - Type: Gram panchayat

Population (2011)
  - Total: 6,303
- Demonym: Jambkar

Languages
  - Official: Marathi
- Time zone: UTC+5:30 (IST)
- PIN: 431716
- Telephone code: 02466
- Vehicle registration: MH-26

Jamb (BK) is a village in Mukhed taluka of Nanded district in the Indian state of Maharashtra. It is 23 kilometres (14 mi) from Mukhed and 69 kilometres (43 mi) from Nanded.

In 2011, the village had a population of 6,303 with literacy rate of 75% and sex ratio of 966.

The village has a Primary Health Centre.
