= Kundalwadi =

- city
- Location in Maharashtra, India
- Coordinates: 18.8564°N 77.7672°E
- Country: India
- State: Maharashtra
- District: Nanded
- Elevation: 350 m (1,150 ft)

Population (2011)
  - Total: 14,760

Languages
  - Official: Marathi
- Time zone: UTC+5:30 (IST)
- PIN: 431711
- Website: www.timesourceservices.com

Kundalwadi is a city and a municipal council in Nanded district in the Indian state of Maharashtra. Famous for Lord Shiva temple (Kundaleshwar).

== Demographics ==
As of 2001 India census, Kundalwadi had a population of 14,355. Males constitute 50% of the population and females 50%. Kundalwadi has an average literacy rate of 47%, lower than the national average of 59.5%: male literacy is 58%, and female literacy is 36%. In Kundalwadi, 15% of the population is under 6 years of age.

Kundalwadi is most famous for medicines for the treatment of dog bite infections.
