= Bodhadi, Nanded =

Village in Maharashtra

Bodhadi
- Village
- Location in Maharashtra Bodhadi (India)
- Coordinates: 19.492253°N 78.1877852°E
- Country: India
- State: Maharashtra
- District: Nanded

Government
  - Type: Gram panchayat
- Elevation: 319 m (1,047 ft)

Population (2011)
  - Total: 8,101
- Demonym: Bodhadikar

Languages
  - Official: Marathi
- Time zone: UTC+5:30 (IST)
- PIN: 431810
- Telephone code: 02469
- Vehicle registration: MH-26

Bodhadi (BK) is a major village in Kinwat taluka of Nanded district in Indian state of Maharashtra.It is located 16 km away from Kinwat while 117 km from Nanded city. In 2011 village had population of 8,101 with literacy rate of 78% and average sex ratio of 992. Village has Primary Health Centre (PHC).
