= Bhokar taluka =

Townsted in Maharashtra, India

Bhokar taluka is a taluka in Nanded district of Maharashtra an Indian state. It was Revenue mahal in Nizam territory under mahalwari Revenue system.

== Nanded district ==
There were 16 talukas in Nanded district as of November 2014: Nanded, Ardhapur, Bhokar, Biloli, Deglur, Dharmabad, Hadgaon, Himayatnagar, Kandhar, Kinwat, Loha, Mahur, Mudkhed, Mukhed, Naigaon, and Umri.

- In 1981, there were Only eight (8) talukas in the district: Nanded, Hadgaon, Kinwat, Bhokar, Biloli, Deglur (Degloor), Mukhed and Kandhar.
