= Nagnath Lalujirao Kottapalle =

Indian writer and academic (1948–2022)

Nagnath Kottapalle
- Born: 29 March 1948; Mukhed, Nanded district, Hyderabad State, India
- Died: 30 November 2022 (aged 74)
- Writing career
- Language: Marathi

Nagnath Lalujirao Kottapalle (29 March 1948 – 30 November 2022) was an Indian educationist and Marathi writer from Maharashtra. He was the vice chancellor of Dr. Babasaheb Ambedkar Marathwada University, whose seat is in Aurangabad, Maharashtra. He was elected as a president of 86th Akhil Bharatiya Marathi Sahitya Sammelan scheduled to be held at Chiplun.

== Early life and education ==
Kottapalle was born in the town of Mukhed in Nanded District on 29 March 1948. He received his B.A. (1969), M.A. (1971), and Ph.D (1980) degrees from Marathwada University in Marathi literature.

== Career ==
Kottapalle started his career as a college lecturer in 1971 and moved up to be the head of Marathi department at University of Pune in 1996.

Kottapalle was a member of the following educational or literary organizations:

- Working Group for Accreditation of Colleges in Maharashtra state (2002 to 20??)
- Rajya Marathi Vikas Sanstha, Maharashtra state (2000 to 20??)
- Sahiya Akademi, General Council, New Delhi (1998–2003)
- Literary Awards Committee, Maharashtra state (1988-90) (Chairmanship)
- Book Purchase Committee for public libraries in Maharashtra state (1995–96)
- Senate, Dr. Babasaheb Ambedkar Marathwada University (1988–91)
- Senate, University of Pune (1997–2001)
- Board of Studies in Marathi, SSC Board, Pune (1995–97) (Chairmanship)
- Coordinating editor of Marathi Vangamaykosh, Vol.II., part II (A project of Maharashtra Rajya Sahitya Sanskriti Mandal)
- Board of Studies in Marathi at:
  - Dr. Babasaheb Ambedkar Marathwada University, (1988–91)
  - North Maharashtra University (1994–99)
  - Pune University (1996 to ? )
  - Mumbai University (2001 to 20??)
  - SNDT Women's University (2001 to 20??)
  - Gulbarga University (2000–2003)
  - Maharaja Sayajirao University (2001 to 20??)
  - Banaras Hindu University (2004 to 20??)
  - Vikram University (2001–2003)
  - Dharwad University (1998–2001)
  - Bharati University (2000 to 20??)
  - Yeshwantrao Chavan University (2001–2003)
  - Maharashtra Mukta Vidyapeeth

== Publications ==
- Poetry:
  - Moods (1976)
- Collections of short stories
  - Curfew Ani Itar Katha (1980)
  - Sandarbha (1984)
  - Rajdhani (1988)
  - Rakha Ani Paus (1992)
  - Kavichi Goshi (1993)
  - Devache Dole (1995)
  - Savitricha Nirnay (2000)
- Novels:
  - Madhyaratra (1985)
  - Gandhariche Dole (1985)
  - Parabhav (1987)
- Literary Criticism:
  - Papudre (1978)
  - Gramin Sahitya: Swaroop Ani Shodh (1985)
  - Navkathakar Shankar Patil (1986)
  - Sahitya Anvayartha (1996)
  - Marathi Kavita : Ek Drushtikshep (1999)
  - Sahityacha Awakash (2003)
- Other Literary Works:
  - Gavat Phulale Chandane (1978) (Novelette)
  - Marathi Sahitya Sammelan Ani Sanskratik Sangharsha (1990)
  - Udyachya Sunder Divasansathi (2000)
  - Jyotiparva (2002) (Biography of Jyotiba Phule)
  - Komejalela Chandra (1985) (Translation of an Oriya novel)
  - Suvarna Buddha (1986) (Translation of a novelette)
  - Satyadhrami Jyotiba Phule (2003) (Biography for students)
  - Rayat Shikshan Sanstha
- Edited Works:
  - Aparthivache Gane (Co-editor) (1978)
  - Stri Purush Tulana (1990)
  - Nivadak B. Raghunath (1995)
  - Shetakaryacha Asood (2001)
  - Gadya Gaurav (Co-editor) (1990)
  - Gadya Vaibhav (Co-editor) (1990)

== Awards ==
- Maharashtra state awards for the following literary works
  - Moods (1976) (Poetry)
  - Sandharbha (1984) (Short Stories)
  - Gandhariche Dole (1985) (Novel)
  - Gramin Sahitya 1985 (Critique)
  - Udyachya Sunder Divsasathi (2002) (Essays)
- Keshavrao Vichare Paritoshik for Jyotiparva (2002) (Biography)
- B. Raghunath Award for Rakha Ani Paus (1995) (Short stories)
- Mahatma Phule Purskar for Rakha Ani Paus (1995)
- Parimal Award for Gramin Sahitya : Swarup Ani Shodh (1985) (Critique)
- Shirish Gandhi Literary Award for Sahitya Awakash (Critique)
- Yeshwantrao Chavan Literary Award (2001)
