= Karadkhed Dam =

- Location within Maharashtra
- Official name: Karadkhed Dam D01295
- Location: Deglur, Nanded District
- Coordinates: 18.476475°N 77.4867735°E
- Opening date: 1978
- Owners: Government of Maharashtra, India

Dam and spillways
- Type of dam: Earthfill
- Impounds: local river
- Height: 19 m (62 ft)
- Length: 1,454 m (4,770 ft)
- Dam volume: 498 km^{3} (119 cu mi)

Reservoir
- Total capacity: 10,980 km^{3} (2,630 cu mi)
- Surface area: 289 km^{2} (112 sq mi)

Karadkhed Dam, is an earthfill dam on local river near Deglur, Nanded district in state of Maharashtra in India.

== Specifications ==
The height of the dam above lowest foundation is 19 m (62 ft) while the length is 1,454 m (4,770 ft). The volume content is 498 km^{3} (119 cu mi) and gross storage capacity is 12,000.00 km^{3} (2,878.95 cu mi). It is situated near Karadkhed which is 12 km away from sub-district headquarter Deglur and 93 km away from district headquarter Nanded.

== Purpose ==
- Irrigation
- Drinking Water Supply to degloor Taluk

== See also ==
- Dams in Maharashtra
- List of reservoirs and dams in India
