= Wajegaon =

- Census town
- Location in Maharashtra, India Wajegaon (India)
- Coordinates: 19.1456°N 77.3491°E
- Country: India
- State: Maharashtra
- District: Nanded

Population (2001)
  - Total: 7,664

Languages
  - Official: Marathi
- Time zone: UTC+5:30 (IST)

Wajegaon is a census town in the Nanded district in the Indian state of Maharashtra.

== Demographics ==
As of 2001 India census, Wajegaon had a population of 7668. Males constitute 51% of the population and females 49%. Wajegaon has an average literacy rate of 51%, lower than the national average of 59.5%: male literacy is 61%, and female literacy is 41%. In Wajegaon, 20% of the population is under 6 years of age.

| Year | Male | Female | Total Population | Change | Religion (%) | | | | | | | |
| Year | Male | Female | Total Population | Change | Hindu | Muslim | Christian | Sikhs | Buddhist | Jain | Other religions and persuasions | Religion not stated |
|---|---|---|---|---|---|---|---|---|---|---|---|---|
| 2001 | 3934 | 3730 | 7664 | - | 20.198 | 58.925 | 0.313 | 0.091 | 19.846 | 0.000 | 0.104 | 0.522 |
| 2011 | 4977 | 4795 | 9772 | 0.275 | 16.568 | 67.223 | 0.143 | 0.000 | 15.984 | 0.000 | 0.000 | 0.082 |
