= Deoni cattle =

Indian breed of cattle

Deoni
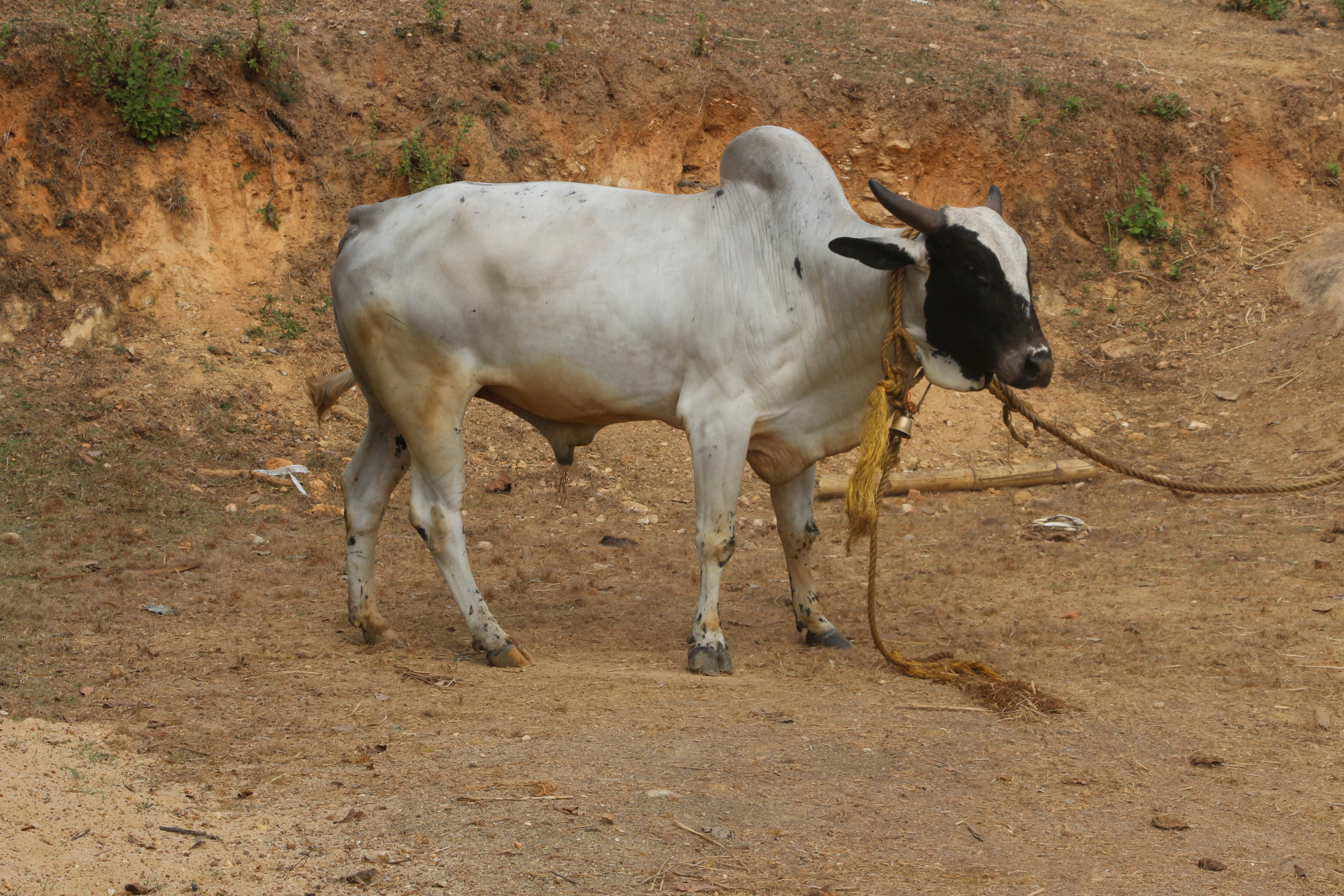
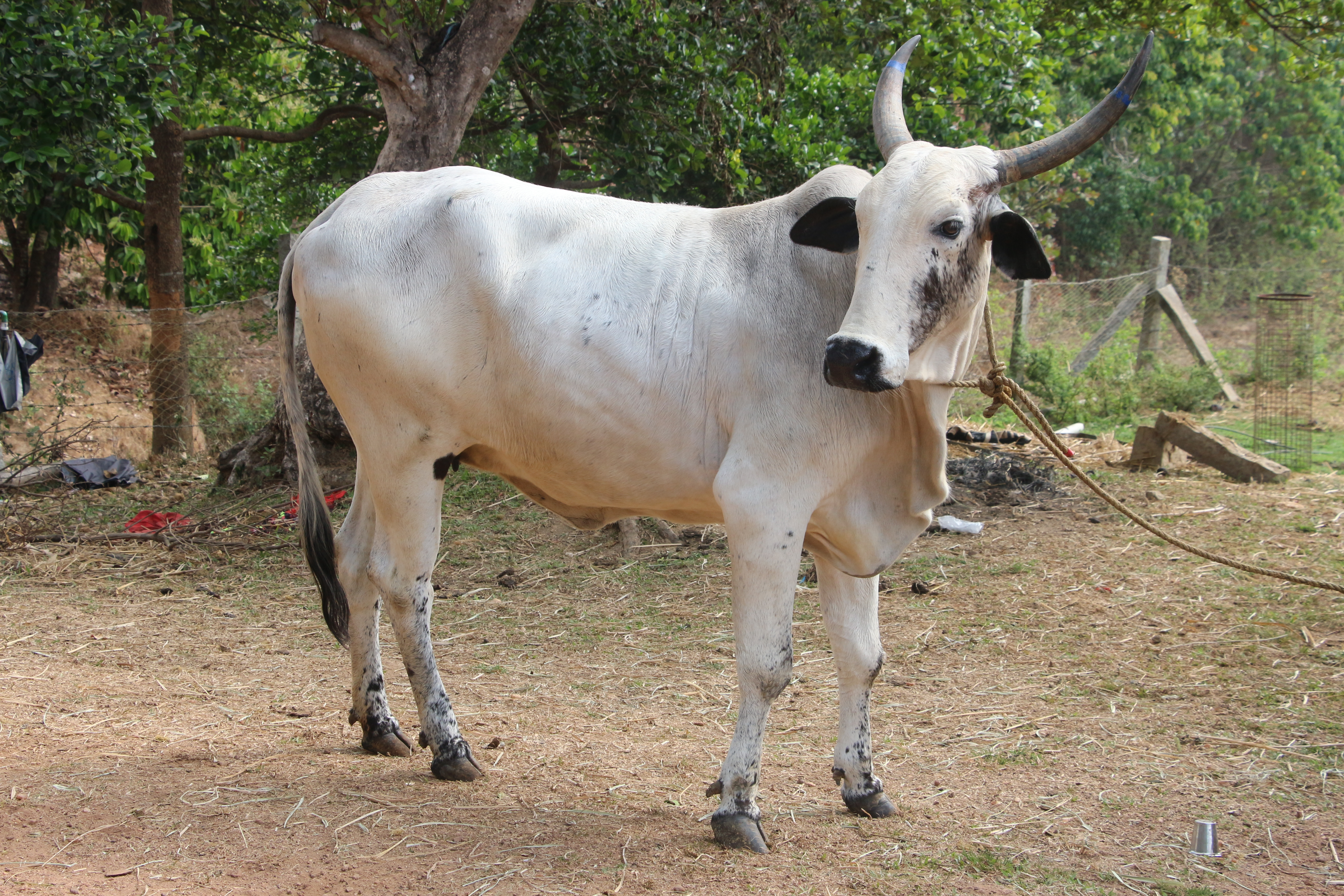
- : 1. Bull 2. Cow
- Conservation status: FAO (2007): not at risk
- Other names: Dongari; Dongarpatti; Devni; Devani; Surti
- Country of origin: India
- Use: dual-purpose: draught, milk

Traits
- Weight: Male: 590 kg; Female: 295 kg
- Height: Male: 135–140 cm; Female: 122 cm
- Horn status: horned

The Deoni is an Indian breed of draught cattle. It is named after the taluk of Deoni in the Latur district of Maharashtra state, and is distributed mainly in the Latur, Nanded, Osmanabad and Parbhani districts of the Marathwada region of Maharashtra, as well as the Bidar district of Karnataka.
