= Udgir =

City in Maharashtra, India

- City
- Udayagiri
- Udgir in Maharashtra
- Coordinates: 18°23′46″N 77°07′03″E
- Country: India
- State: Maharashtra
- District: Latur
- Taluka: Udgir
- Founder: unknown
- Named for: Udaygiri Baba

Government
  - Type: Municipal Council
  - Body: Udgir city Municipal Council, Udgir

Area
  - Total: 66.800 km^{2} (25.792 sq mi)
- Elevation: 632 m (2,073 ft)

Population (2011 census)
  - Total: 435,063
  - Density: 8,007/km^{2} (20,740/sq mi)
- Demonym: Udgirkar
- Time zone: UTC+5:30 (IST)
- PIN: 413517
- Telephone code: 02385
- Vehicle registration: MH-55
- Official language: Marathi
- Lok Sabha constituency: Latur
- Vidhan Sabha constituency: Udgir
- Website: udgirmahaulb.maharashtra.gov.in/en

Udgir is a city and Municipal Council in Latur District in the state of Maharashtra, India. It is also the headquarters for Udgir Taluka, one of the ten talukas in Udgir, and one of the largest cities in Aurangabad division of the Indian state of Maharashtra. It is located in the Marathwada division of the state (one of the divisions of Maharashtra based on geographical conditions). The city is located very close to the borders of Karnataka and Telangana states. Udgir is home to the historical Udgir Fort. The town and nearby villages rely mainly on agriculture, which serves as a major source of income for the population. Before independence, Udgir, Ahmadpur and Nilanga were part of Bidar District Hyderabad kingdom under the rule of Nizam Asifjah VI, After integration of Hyderabad kingdom into India it became part of Osmanabad district.

== Demographics ==
Udgir is a Taluka located in the Latur district of Maharashtra. It is one of the 10 Talukas of Latur District. There are 98 villages and 2 towns in Udgir Taluka.

As per the population census of 2011, Udgir Taluka has 56,806 households, and a population of 311,066 of which 161,568 are males and 149,498 are females. The population of children between the ages of 0-6 is 41,456 which is 13.33% of the total population.

The sex-ratio of Udgir Taluka is around 925 compared to 929 which is around the average of Maharashtra. The literacy rate of Udgir Taluka is 68.71% out of which 74.37% males and 62.6% females are literate. The total area of Udgir is 736.26 km^{2} with a population density of 422 per km^{2}.

Out of its total population, 64.06% of the population lives in an urban area and 35.94% lives in a rural area. Marathi is the official language. Hindi & Urdu are also spoken.

The main source of income in Udgir Taluka comes from agriculture, shops and small scale industries. The town is popular for its inventory in food grains which is the result of high grain crop production in nearby villages.

== History ==
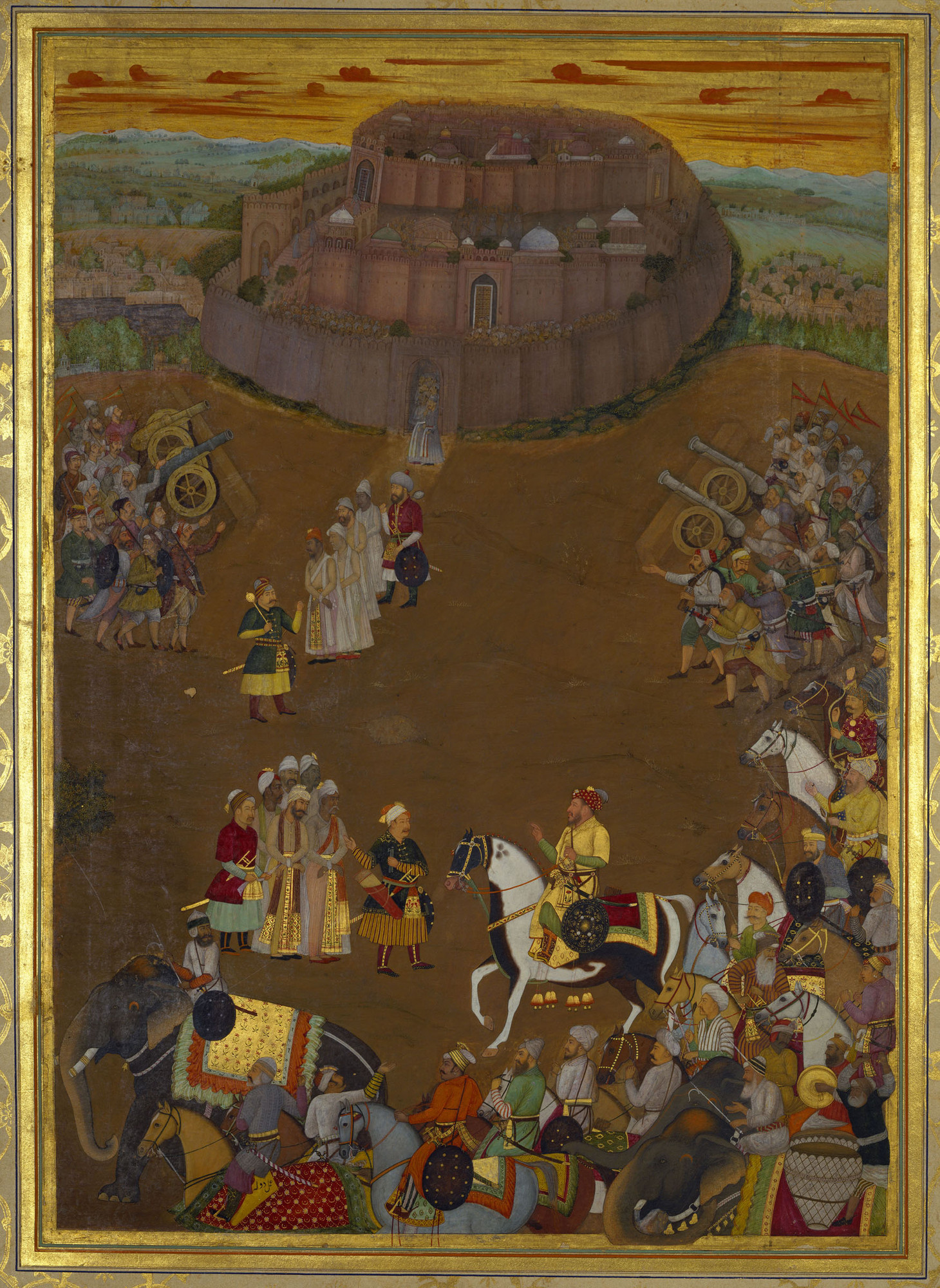
The Mughal Army of Shah Jahan capture Udgir.

There are some old and popular places of worship located in the town and nearby which includes Shri Udalik Baba Temple, Shri Bodhan Aai Temple, Shri Somnathpur Temple, Shri Hawagi Swami Temple and Hazrath Khaja Sadharudeen Basha Dargha Sherif, which is about 400 years old. The town gets its name from the Saint Udalik or Udalik Baba who took Samadhi in the city's fort.

== Climate ==
Climate data for Udgir (1991–2020)
Month	Jan	Feb	Mar	Apr	May	Jun	Jul	Aug	Sep	Oct	Nov	Dec	Year
Record high °C (°F)	33.5 (92.3)	36.8 (98.2)	40.2 (104.4)	42.3 (108.1)	43.4 (110.1)	46.2 (115.2)	36.6 (97.9)	35.0 (95.0)	34.0 (93.2)	39.0 (102.2)	33.0 (91.4)	33.3 (91.9)	46.2 (115.2)
Mean daily maximum °C (°F)	29.7 (85.5)	32.2 (90.0)	35.3 (95.5)	38.4 (101.1)	39.6 (103.3)	34.4 (93.9)	29.9 (85.8)	29.1 (84.4)	29.6 (85.3)	30.7 (87.3)	29.6 (85.3)	29.1 (84.4)	32.3 (90.1)
Mean daily minimum °C (°F)	14.2 (57.6)	16.3 (61.3)	19.8 (67.6)	23.0 (73.4)	25.1 (77.2)	21.9 (71.4)	20.2 (68.4)	19.6 (67.3)	19.6 (67.3)	18.2 (64.8)	16.0 (60.8)	13.7 (56.7)	19.0 (66.2)
Record low °C (°F)	7.1 (44.8)	8.7 (47.7)	13.7 (56.7)	16.0 (60.8)	16.6 (61.9)	15.0 (59.0)	16.3 (61.3)	14.2 (57.6)	15.2 (59.4)	12.0 (53.6)	9.0 (48.2)	7.8 (46.0)	7.1 (44.8)
Average rainfall mm (inches)	6.8 (0.27)	11.0 (0.43)	32.4 (1.28)	20.7 (0.81)	20.2 (0.80)	107.9 (4.25)	206.2 (8.12)	221.5 (8.72)	227.5 (8.96)	85.4 (3.36)	13.5 (0.53)	1.1 (0.04)	954.1 (37.56)
Average rainy days	0.6	1.4	2.9	2.1	1.5	8.2	10.6	11.1	9.9	3.9	0.6	0.1	53.0
Average relative humidity (%) (at 17:30 IST)	41	34	32	25	27	52	70	72	72	55	51	45	48
Source: India Meteorological Department

== Transport ==
=== Railway ===
Udgir's railway station is connected by trains available from and to Hyderabad, Bidar, Latur, Purna, Parli Vaijnath, Nanded, Aurangabad, Pune, Mumbai, Shirdi, Bangaluru, Kazipet, Guntur, Vijayawada Kakinada, Machilipatnam and Tirupati. Udgir comes under the South Central Railways zone of the Indian Railways; it is part of the Secunderabad Division.

Upcoming Railway projects:
The Udgir Bodhan railwayline was proposed in 1938 to connect Udgir with Nizamabad via Deglur. The 20 km railwayline was completed between Bodhan and Nizamabad and now the remaining 92 km railwayline will be planned. During the Government of Atal Bihari Vajpayee the Udgir Bodhan railwayline was surveyed and became sanctioned.
Another railwayline between Nanded and Udgir is also planned because Nanded and Bidar have Sikh holy cities and the government wants to connect them. The 102 km Nanded Udgir railwayline is also planned.

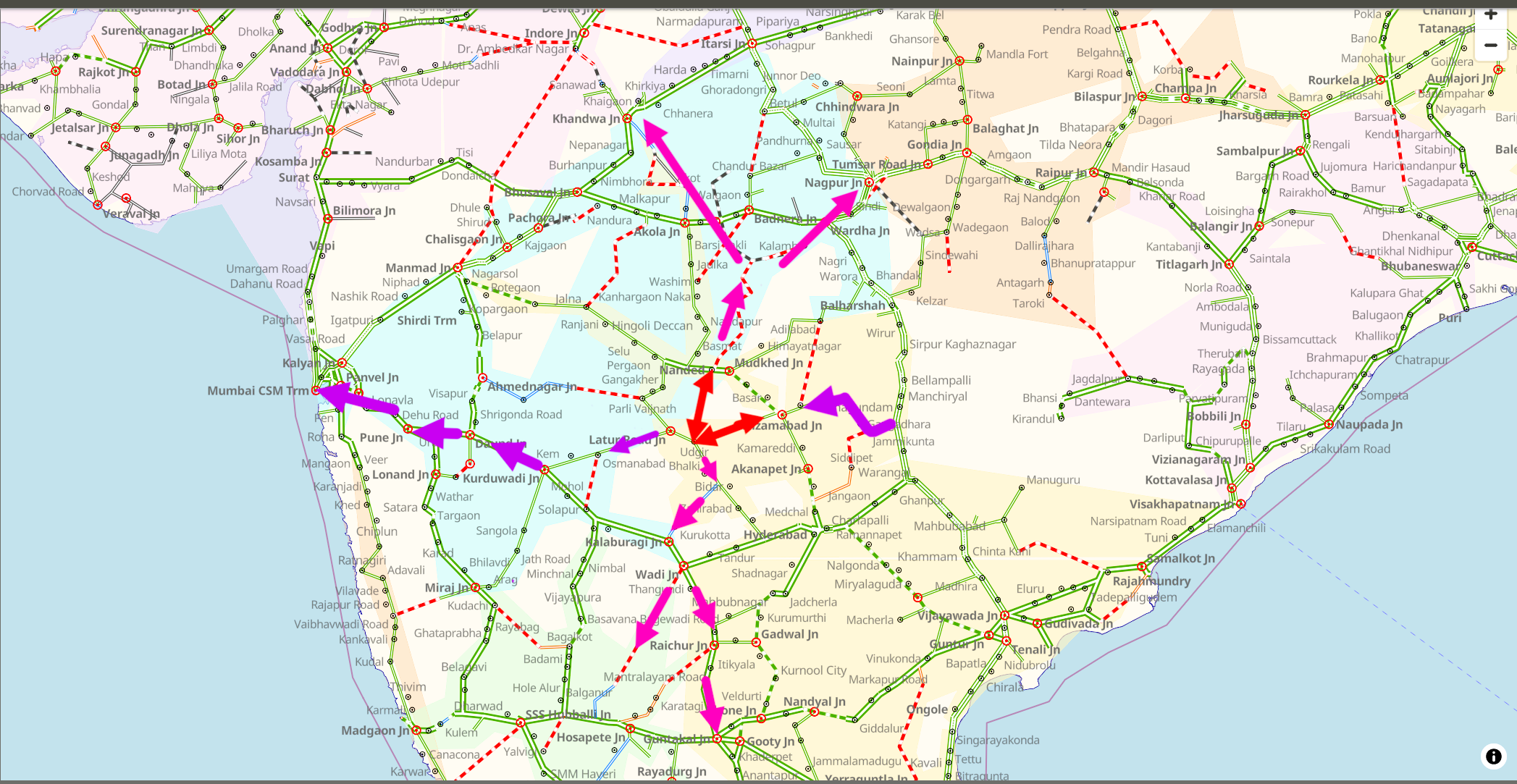
Map showing the railway line connecting Nanded and Nizamabad (via Bodhan) to Udgir.

=== Roads ===
Udgir is connected by roads with all major villages and cities in Maharashtra and nearby states. Maharashtra's bus services, commonly known as ST or Maharashtra State Road Transport Corporation, operate day and night buses in and out of the town, providing overnight transportation. Interstate government transport buses are also available from and to Bidar and Hyderabad. Private buses also run daily from and to major cities like Mumbai, Pune & Chhatrapati Sambhajinagar.

Two National Highways pass through Udgir: NH 50 passes through Udgir and connects to NH 65 for Hyderabad, and NH 63 starts from Barshi, Latur, Renapur, and Degloor, and continues towards Nizamabad.

=== Air ===
The nearest domestic airport is Shri Guru Gobind Singh Ji Airport, Nanded, Maharashtra which is 100 km away. The nearest international airport, which is at 225 km from Udgir, is Rajiv Gandhi International Airport, Hyderabad, Telangana State, India. Raja krishnadevray Domestic Airport, UDGIR is proposed for Udgir city but not mentioned in recent maharashtra budget or officially government of Maharashtra not declared.

== Agriculture ==
The main occupation of the people of Udgir is agriculture. Udgir has farmers that make up the rural setting in most of the surrounding areas. The soil as a part of the Deccan plateau is black basalt soil, rich in hummus. The main crops cultivated here are whole grains, including jawar, bajra, and wheat. Crops like sorghum, mung, toor dal, urad gram, soybean, sugarcane, onions, and other green leafy vegetables are also cultivated.

A dairy was established in the early 1980s. It emerged as a major employment resource for rural Udgirkars. Due to gradually-lowered production, the dairy is at a standstill. It came under the state government-run project called Aarey which was institutionalized during the Operation Flood.

Agriculture-based businesses like pulses (dal) industry, warehouses, cold storage, sugarcane factories also run in Udgir. Udgir has around 80 dal (mills) processing units.

== Government Milk Scheme ==
Udgir has a skimmed milk powder plant established in 1978 and has capacity processing 1 lakh litres of dairy milk per day. Its conversion capacity is 10 M.T. S.M.P. per day.

== Places of interest ==
=== Udgir Fort ===
Udgir Fort is a fort built in the pre-Bahamani age which dates from the twelfth century CE. It is also famous for its historic battle in which the Marathas, led by Sadashivrao Bhau, defeated the Nizam, and after which the treaty of Udgir was signed. The fort is bounded by a 40-foot-deep trench, as the fort is built at ground level. In the fort are several palaces, Durbar halls and the grave of Udaygiri Maharaj which is 60 feet below ground level. It is rumoured that the Udgir fort has a direct subway deep underground connecting with Bhalki and the Bidar forts.

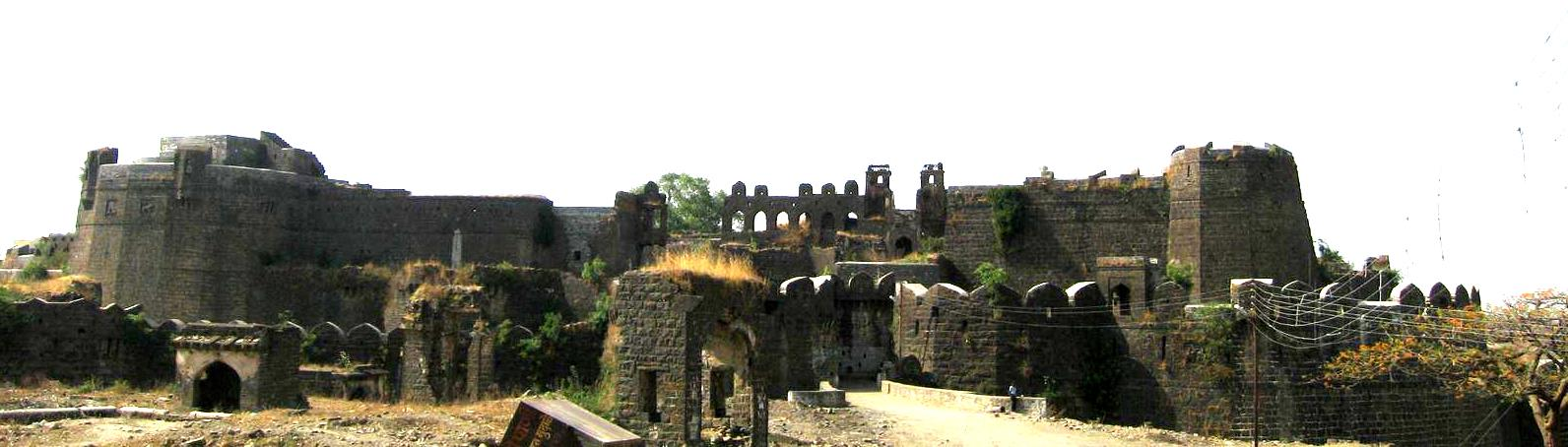
Udgir Fort
