= Hyderabad Samajik Sudhar Sangh =

Social movement

Hyderabad Samajik Sudhar Sangh or Hyderabad Social Service League, was a social movement formed in 1915 in Hyderabad (present capital of Telangana State, India). Keshav Rao Koratkar and Vaman Naik were founders of this movement.

== Annual social conferences ==
Hyderabad Social Service League held annual social conferences in various parts of erstwhile Hyderabad state. The passed Social Service League conferences passed resolutions on subjects like necessity of promoting primary education, women's education remarriage of widows, inter caste marriages, and opening of libraries in the State.

Conference No	Conference Year	Held At	Chaired by	Rsolutions
1	1918	Kavana Taluka Hadgaon	Sadanand Maharaj	
2	1919	Hadgaon Dist. Nanded	Keshavrao Koratkar	
3	20 June 1920	Nanded		
4	11 Nov 1921	Hyderabad	Maharshi Dhondo Keshav Karve	
5	23 April 1923	Gulbarga	Barrister Mukundrao Jaikara	
6		Hyderabad	Sarla Chaudhari	
