= Ardhapur =

Ardhapur Aradhyapur
- town
- Location in Maharashtra, India
- Coordinates: 19°17′0″N 77°23′0″E
- Country: India
- State: Maharashtra
- District: Nanded

Government
  - Body: Nagar Panchayat

Population (2011)
  - Total: 30,000

Languages
  - Official: Marathi
- Time zone: UTC+5:30 (IST)
- PIN: 431704
- Vehicle registration: MH26
- Nearest city: Nanded
- Lok Sabha constituency: Nanded
- Vidhan Sabha constituency: Bhokar
- Civic agency: Nagar Panchayat

Ardhapur is a town and a municipal council in Nanded Subdivision of Nanded district in the Indian state of Maharashtra.

Ardhapur is known for its rich crop of bananas and improved road connectivity. The town has close connectivity with Nanded City.

== History and origin ==
The name Ardhapur probably originated from the Sanskrit word Aradhyapur. One stone inscription at Ardhapur is in a neglected state near Shiva temple, stating that some dynasty of the Rashtrakutas was also ruling over Degloor. There are many noticeable ancient sights such as Khaperkheda Shiva Temple, the stone inscription and Keshavraj Vishnu temple.

== Transportation ==
=== Roadways ===
Ardhapur is on National Highway 361 and, In the coming years, will have more proximity to additional national highways such as 161, Shaktipeeth Highway, and Samruddhi Link expressway.

=== Railways ===
The most awaited Nanded Wardha Railway line is going through Ardhapur.

=== Airports ===
The Nanded Airport is 12 KM from Ardhapur.
