= Peth Umri =

Peth Umri Umari Umri (Rly. Station)
- Tehsil & city
- Location in Maharashtra, India Peth Umri (India)
- Coordinates: 19.0642°N 77.6519°E
- Country: India
- State: Maharashtra
- District: Nanded
- Named for: Market Committee

Government
  - Type: City Council
  - Body: Nagar Palika

Population (2001)
  - Total: 11,151

Languages
  - Official: Marathi
- Time zone: UTC+5:30 (IST)
- Postal code: 431807
- Vehicle registration: MH-26

Peth Umri is a city and a municipal council in Nanded district in the Indian state of Maharashtra.It belongs to Bhokar Assembly constituency which was won by Ashok Shankarrao Chavan of Indian national congress in the last assembly elections

== Demographics ==
According to the 2001 Census of India, Peth Umri had a population of 11,151. Males constitute 52% of the population and females 48%. Peth Umri has an average literacy rate of 66%, higher than the national average of 59.5%: male literacy is 76%, and female literacy is 55%. In Peth Umri, 15% of the population is under 6 years of age.

Year	Male	Female	Total Population	Change	Religion (%)							
Year	Male	Female	Total Population	Change	Hindu	Muslim	Christian	Sikhs	Buddhist	Jain	Other religions and persuasions	Religion not stated
2001	5759	5392	11151	-	74.361	14.698	0.018	0.018	9.927	0.960	0.018	0.000
2011	6868	6633	13501	+21.1%	71.817	17.228	0.000	0.763	9.562	0.585	0.015	0.030
