= Datta Bhagat =

Indian writer

Dattatraya (alias Datta) Ganpat Bhagat (born 13 June 1945 in Waghi village of Nanded district, Maharashtra) is an Indian Marathi playwright, Ambedkarite thinker and one of the leaders of the Dalit theater movement in Marathi. He is a professor of Marathi at the Dr. Babasaheb Ambedkar Marathwada University in Aurangabad, Maharashtra.

== Works ==
His play Avart (whirlpool) was critically acclaimed for its use of the traditional forms of dindi and tamasha to reflect on Dalit oppression against the background of a pilgrimage to Pandharpur.

His long plays like "Ashmak", "Kheliya" were liked by most of his senior critics and was successfully produced.

His other play Wata Palwata (Routes and Escapes) is also well known and included in the collection of Indian plays Drama Contemporary by Erin B Mee. It is considered to be 'a milestone in Marathi theater'. He is also noted for his literary criticism, particularly the essay Dalit chetna aur Marathi Dalit Rangmanch (Dalit consciousness and Marathi Dalit theater). Datta Bhagat was selected as the President of the 37th Marathwada Sahitya Sammelan of Marathwada Sahitya Parishad at Jalna in 2006 Datta Bhagat was selected as the President of the ८६ vya Akhil Bhartiy Marathi Natya Sammelan २००६ at Nanded.
