= Deglur taluka =

Taluka in Maharashtra, India

Deglur taluka is a taluka in Nanded district of Maharashtra an Indian state.

== Nanded district ==
There were 18 talukas in Nanded district as of November 2017, viz. Nanded, Ardhapur, Bhokar, Biloli, Deglur, Dharmabad, Hadgaon, Himayatnagar, Kandhar, Kinwat, Loha, Mahur, Mudkhed, Mukhed, Naigaon, and Umri. In 1981, there were eight talukas in the district, viz. Nanded, Hadgaon, Kinwat, Bhokar, Biloli, Deglur (Degloor), Mukhed and Kandhar.
