= Udgir Fort =

Historical fort in Udgir city

- Part of Udgir, Latur district, Maharashtra
- Udgir, Latur district, Maharashtra, India
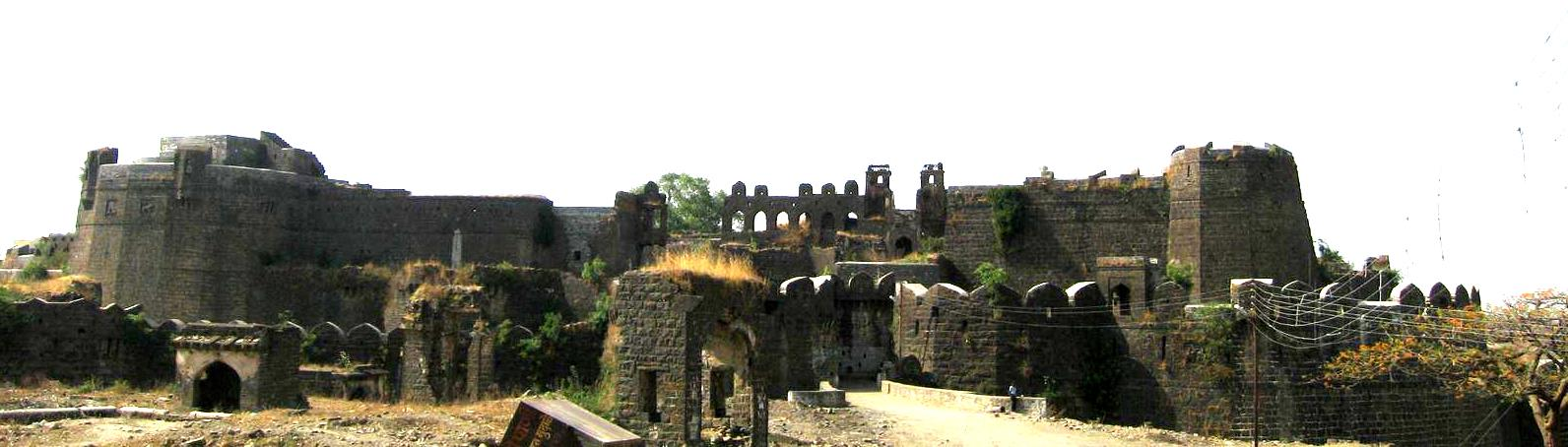

Site information
- Type: Fort
- Owner: Government of Maharashtra
- Controlled by: Government of Maharashtra
- Open to the public: Yes
- Condition: Ruins

Location
- Location within Maharashtra
- Coordinates: 18.4028°N 77.1178°E
- Height: 2,100 metres (6,900 ft)

Site history
- Built: 12th Century
- Built by: unknown, pre-Bahmani
- Battles/wars: Battle of Udgir (1760)

Udgir Fort in the Udgir city in Latur district, Maharashtra of India is a fort built in pre-Bahamani age, dating from the twelfth century CE. It is famous for the historic Battle of Udgir of 1760, in which the Marathas, led by Sadashivrao Bhau, defeated the Nizam, and after which the Treaty of Udgir was signed. The fort is named after the Hindu Saint Udaygiri Rishi.

Scattered throughout the surrounding hills, there are a number of old military observation points and rest houses, built from an unusual white clay. However, all have long since fallen into disrepair. Udgir Fort may also feature a deep tunnel that connects it to the forts of Bhalki and Bidar.

The fort is bounded by a 40-foot-deep (12 m) trench, and contains several palaces, as well as the Samadhi of Udaygir Maharaj, which is 60 feet (18 m) under the normal ground level. It has some rare inscriptions written in Arabic and Persian.

The fort served as a military base of Marathas so as to maintain pressure on the Nizam. The fort was under the control of Marathas until 1818 and later on, it shifted towards Nizam from the British.

In 2022, during cleaning of the premises of the fort by volunteers, 5 cannons and numerous unused cannonballs were found which were estimated to be dated of 14th or 15th century.
