= Deoni Taluka =

Coordinates: 18.263889°N 77.082222°E

Deoni Taluka is a taluka, administrative subdivision, of Latur District in Maharashtra, India. The administrative center for the taluka is the village of Deoni. In the 2011 census, there were forty-six Grampanchayat in Deoni Taluka.
