= Udgir Taluka =

- Taluka
- Country: India
- State: Maharashtra
- District: Latur
- Division: Chhatrapati Sambhajinagar division
- Headquarters: Udgir

Government
  - Type: Panchayat samiti
  - Body: Panchayat Samiti, Udgir

Area
  - Total: 861.9 km^{2} (332.8 sq mi)

Population (2021)
  - Total: 361,984
  - Density: 420.0/km^{2} (1,088/sq mi)
- Time zone: UTC+5:30 (Indian Standard Time)

Udgir Taluka, officially known as, Udayagiri Taluka, is a taluka and administrative subdivision of Latur District in the Indian state of Maharashtra. The administrative center for the taluka is the town of Udgir. In the 2011 census there were eighty-seven panchayat villages in Udgir Taluka.

== Demographics ==
From 2001 to 2011 the population of Udgir Taluka rose from 263,989 to 311,457 for an increase of 17.98%. The female/male gender ratio worsened from 929 (females per thousand males) in 2001 to 911 (females per thousand males) in 2011. Literacy increased from 74.21% in 2001 to 80.18% in 2011.
