= Desaiganj taluka =

Desaiganj (Wadsa) Taluka
- Taluka
- Interactive map of Desaiganj (Wadsa) Taluka
- Country: India
- State: Maharashtra
- District: Gadchiroli district
- Headquarters: Desaiganj Town

Area
  - Taluka: 262.74 km^{2} (101.44 sq mi)

Population (2011)
  - Taluka: 83,607
  - Density: 318.21/km^{2} (824.17/sq mi)
  - Urban: 28,781
  - Rural: 54,826

Demographics
  - Literacy rate: 73.80%
  - Sex ratio: 990

Desaiganj (Wadsa) Taluka, is a Taluka in Desaiganj (Wadsa) subdivision of Gadchiroli district in Maharashtra State of India.

== Demographics ==
As per Indian government census of 2011, the population was 83,607.
