= Kinwat =

- Town
- Location in Maharashtra Kinwat (India)
- Coordinates: 19.60604°N 78.2007863°E
- Country: India
- State: Maharashtra
- District: Nanded

Government
  - Type: Municipal Council
- Elevation: 319 m (1,047 ft)

Population (2011)
  - Total: 28,454
- Demonym: Kinwatkar

Languages
  - Official: Marathi
- Time zone: UTC+5:30 (IST)
- PIN: 431804
- Telephone code: 241811
- Vehicle registration: MH-26

Kinwat is a city which falls under the municipal council of the Nanded District, in the Indian state of Maharashtra. The Kinwat Taluka came into existence in 1905 when a number of villages from Narsapur, Tamsi, and Nirmal Talukas from the Adilabad District, were combined. Earlier, these villages were under the Hyderabad Division. In 2011, Kinwat had population of 28454 with literacy rate of 82% and female sex ratio of 929. Kinwat is 125 km away from Nanded city. Kinwat has Rural Hospital.

== Geography ==
Kinwat is located at 19.63°N 78.2°E in the Indian state of Maharashtra in the district of Nanded. It has an average elevation of 314 meters (1030 feet). The Penganga River flows alongside the town while the Nagzari Dam is located just a few kilometers away from it. The dam is the only water source for nearby residents. Drinking water is taken from the deep ground levels by new colonies, leading to a possible cause for the sunken water table. The most popular residential area is SVM colony, Lecturer colony and Khoja colony. The city has few large-scale farms on Kinwat-Mandwa-Nagzari Road. Kinwat also has wide area forests. Kinwat has a waterfall at islapur, and hot springs at unkeshwar.

== Transport ==
Kinwat has a railway station on the Mudkhed-Adilabad Meter Gauge (Now Broad Gauge) Section; previously, the Hyderabad (HYB) Division of the South Central Railway (SCR). After Divisional adjustments in 2003, which saw the bifurcation of Hyderabad Division, Kinwat is now under the Nanded (NED) Division of the SCR. The Mudkhed-Adilabad Meter Gauge Section has since then converted into Broad Gauge. Now the Broad Gauge, linking Kinwat to most of the major cities in India like Mumbai, Kolkata, Hyderabad, and Nagpur has created benefits for the citizens as it allows new trains to pass the station.

== Demographics ==
According to the 2011 India census, Kinwat had a population of 28454. Males constitute 51% of the population and females 49%. This city boasts of an average literacy rate of 82%, which stands higher than the national average of 74%. Male literacy is 88% and female literacy is 76%. In Kinwat, 14% of the population is under the age of 6 years.

| Year | Male | Female | Total Population | Change | Religion (%) | | | | | | | |
| Year | Male | Female | Total Population | Change | Hindu | Muslim | Christian | Sikhs | Buddhist | Jain | Other religions and persuasions | Religion not stated |
|---|---|---|---|---|---|---|---|---|---|---|---|---|
| 2001 | 12,715 | 12,163 | 24,878 | - | 57.175 | 34.786 | 0.173 | 0.201 | 7.537 | 0.060 | 0.000 | 0.068 |
| 2011 | 14,481 | 13,973 | 28,454 | 0.144 | 56.196 | 35.183 | 0.295 | 0.176 | 7.549 | 0.105 | 0.039 | 0.457 |

== See also ==
- Bodhadi, one of major village in Kinwat taluka.
