= Wild custard apple =

Wild custard apple, and wild soursop may refer to at least two species of plant in the genus Annona:

- Annona montana, native to Central America, the Amazon, and the Caribbean
- Annona senegalensis, also called African custard apple
