= Deoni =

Village in Maharashtra, India

- town
- Location in Maharashtra, India Deoni (India)
- Coordinates: 18°15′50″N 77°04′56″E
- Country: India
- State: Maharashtra
- District: Latur
- Taluka: Deoni

Government
  - Type: Nagar Panchayat
  - Body: Nagar Panchayat

Population (2011)
  - Total: 97,598

Languages
  - Official: Marathi
- Time zone: UTC+5:30 (IST)
- PIN: 413519
- Telephone code: +02385
- Vehicle registration: MH24 / MH55
- Lok Sabha constituency: Latur
- Vidhan Sabha constituency: Nilanga
- Literacy: 70%
- Website: maharashtra.gov.in

Deoni is a town and administrative centre of Deoni Taluka in Latur subdivision of Latur district in the Indian state of Maharashtra. Deoni has a total area of 415.32 km^{2}.

== Demographics ==
In the 2001 Indian census, the village of Deoni recorded 11,276 inhabitants. In the 2011 census, Deoni had 18,793 households and a population of 97,598. Deoni cattle are being maintained at Cattle BreedingFarm, College of Veterinary and Animal Sciences, Udgir (MAFSU), Maharashtra; Deoni Cattle Breeding Farm, Gudgaripalli, Andhra Pradesh; Govt Farm, Kampasagar, Andhra Pradesh and Livestock Research and Information Centre (Deoni), Hallikhed (B), KVAFSU, Bidar, Karnataka.

== History ==
=== Deoni cattlebreeding farm ===
A deoni cattle breeding farm was initiated by the Durrani brothers, who were also renowned advocates of the erstwhile princely state of Hyderabad. And their father Shahzadah Gulab Muhammad Khan Durrani Sadozai Abdali, was the Mansabdar of 1000 zat rank.He was also the fifth direct descendant of His Majesty Ahmed Shah Abdali., the founder of Afghanistan.
