= Umri, Nanded =

Umri is a city and taluka in Nanded subdivision of Nanded district of Maharashtra in India.
