= Arjuni-Morgaon taluka =

Subdivision in Maharashtra, India

Coordinates: 21.4351735°N 79.1235352°E

Arjuni Morgaon taluka
- Taluka
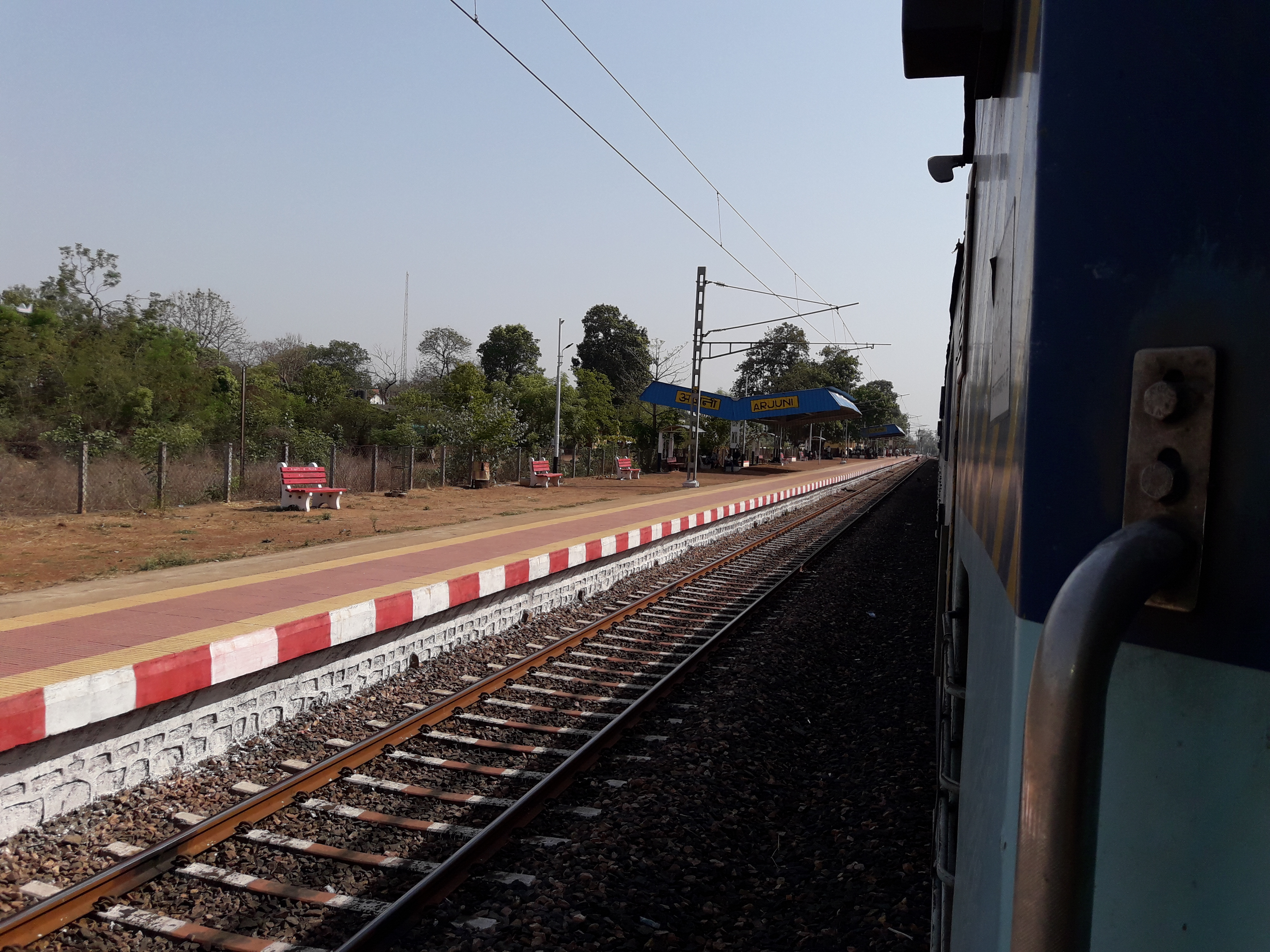
- Arjuni Station
- Interactive map of Arjuni Morgaon taluka
- Country: India
- State: Maharashtra
- Regions: Vidharbha
- District: Gondia District
- Headquarters: Arjuni Morgaon Town

Area
  - Total: 644.91 km^{2} (249.00 sq mi)

Population (2011 census)
  - Total: 143,512
  - Density: 222.53/km^{2} (576.35/sq mi)
  - Sex ratio: 935
- Time zone: UTC+5:30 (IST)
- PIN: Arjuni Morgaon - 441701
- STD Code: 91-7196
- Revenue circle: 5
- Average rainfall: 1175 mm

Arjuni-Morgaon is a taluka in Arjuni Morgaon Subdivision in Maharashtra, India.
