= Umri Kalan =

- Town
- Location in Uttar Pradesh, India Umri Kalan (India)
- Coordinates: 29.2°N 78.34°E
- Country: India
- State: Uttar Pradesh
- District: Moradabad

Area
  - Total: 3.36 km^{2} (1.30 sq mi)

Population (2017)
  - Total: 21,803
  - Density: 6,490/km^{2} (16,800/sq mi)

Languages
  - Official: Hindi
- Time zone: UTC+5:30 (IST)
- PIN: 244501
- Vehicle registration: UP
- Website: up.gov.in

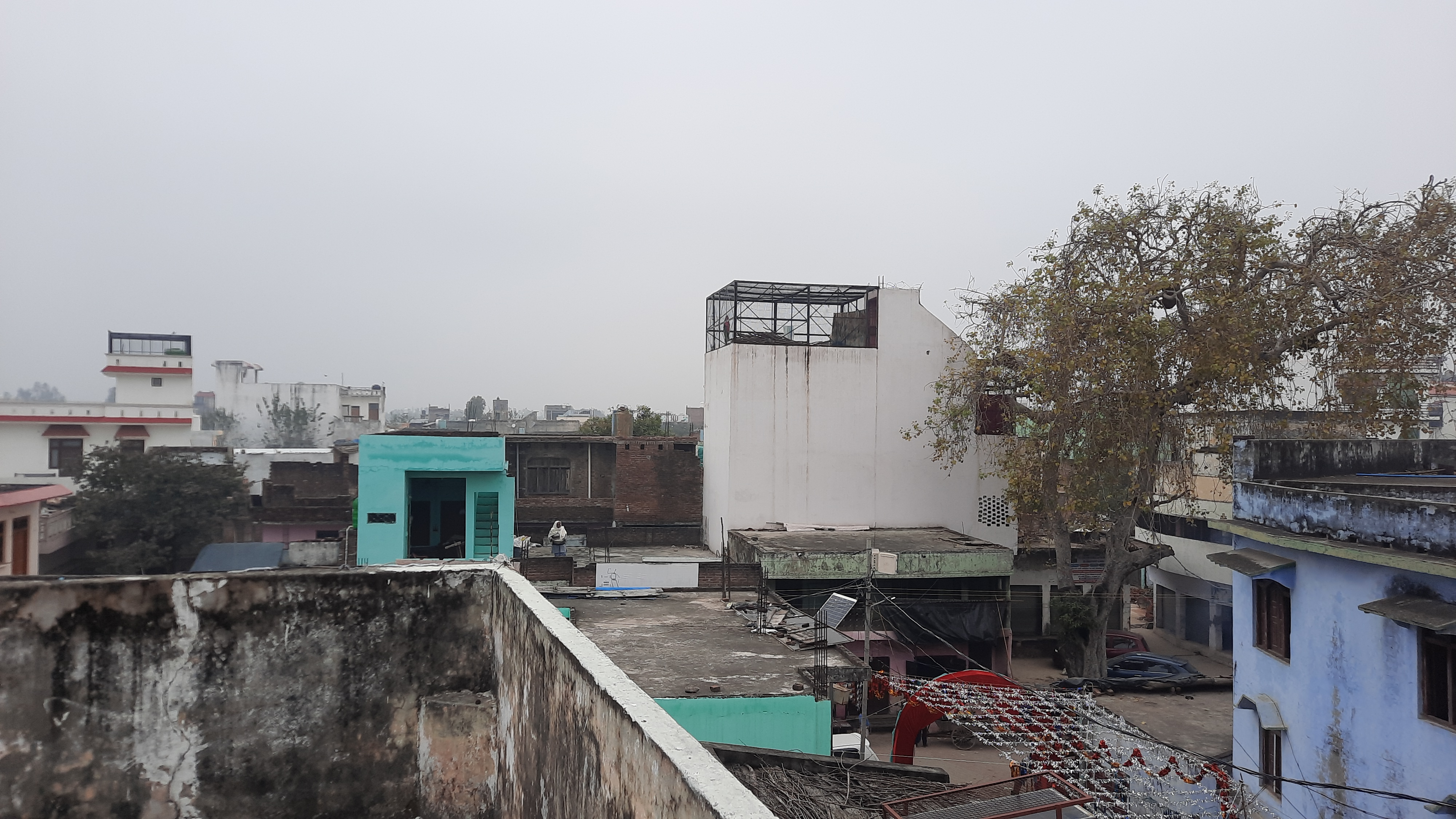

Umri Kalan is a town in the Moradabad district in the Indian state of Uttar Pradesh, in Northern India.

== History ==
The name Umri Kalan is derived from the name of Caliph Umar. "Kalan" means big. Before 1757, when the British East India Company Rule was instituted, the official name was Umari Kalan Ganj Faridi.

In 1265, the Sufi saint Fariduddin Ganjshakar and his nephew Sabir Kaliyari stayed in Umri Kalan. They left two of their disciples there, working towards the Sufism mission.

The Gate of Umri Kalan was named Shaikh-ul-Hadees Syed Maulana Fakhr-ul-Hasan Gate, after Syed Maulana Fakhrul Hasan who was born in 1905 (A H 1323), at Umri Kalan.

The gate was built in 2006 by Syed Nasir Ali, a two-time winner of chairmanship of Umri Kalan district moradabad. He is recognised by shree Mayawati behen (former Chief Minister, Uttar Pradesh) for his development in Umri Kalan in road structure and drainage.

In the late 1960s, he Syed Maulana Fakhrul Hasan held a high office at the Darul Uloom Deoband.

Town Umri Kalan Muslim Population 99.5 percent and Hndu Population 0.5 percent.

Two dominant Groups in Umri Kalan are Descendents of Hazrat Umar Farooq R.A., known as Shaikh Farooqi and other one are Descendents of Hazrat Abu Ayyub Ansari R.A from Tribe in Medina named Qabila Banu Najjar sub-clan of Qabila Banu Khajraj, Known as Shaikh Aal-e-Ansaar.
