= Umri Pragane Balapur =

- Suburb
- Location in Maharashtra, India
- Coordinates: 20.7115°N 77.0364°E
- Country: India
- State: Maharashtra
- District: Akola

Population (2011)
  - Total: 20,262

Languages
  - Official: Marathi
- Time zone: UTC+5:30 (IST)

Umri Pragane Balapur is a census town in Akola district in the Indian state of Maharashtra.

== Demographics ==
As of 2001 India census, Umri Pragane Balapur had a population of 16,262. Males constitute 52% of the population and females 48%. Umri Pragane Balapur has an average literacy rate of 79%, higher than the national average of 59.5%: male literacy is 83%, and female literacy is 74%. In Umri Pragane Balapur, 12% of the population is under 6 years of age.

Year	Male	Female	Total Population	Change	Religion (%)							
Year	Male	Female	Total Population	Change	Hindu	Muslim	Christian	Sikhs	Buddhist	Jain	Other religions and persuasions	Religion not stated
2001	8465	7799	16264	-	90.076	0.061	0.154	0.061	9.204	0.283	0.000	0.160
2011	10469	9793	20262	0.246	89.320	0.064	0.232	0.074	9.861	0.286	0.000	0.163
