= Akhand Harinam Saptah =

Devotional program in Hinduism

- अखंड हरिनाम सप्ताह
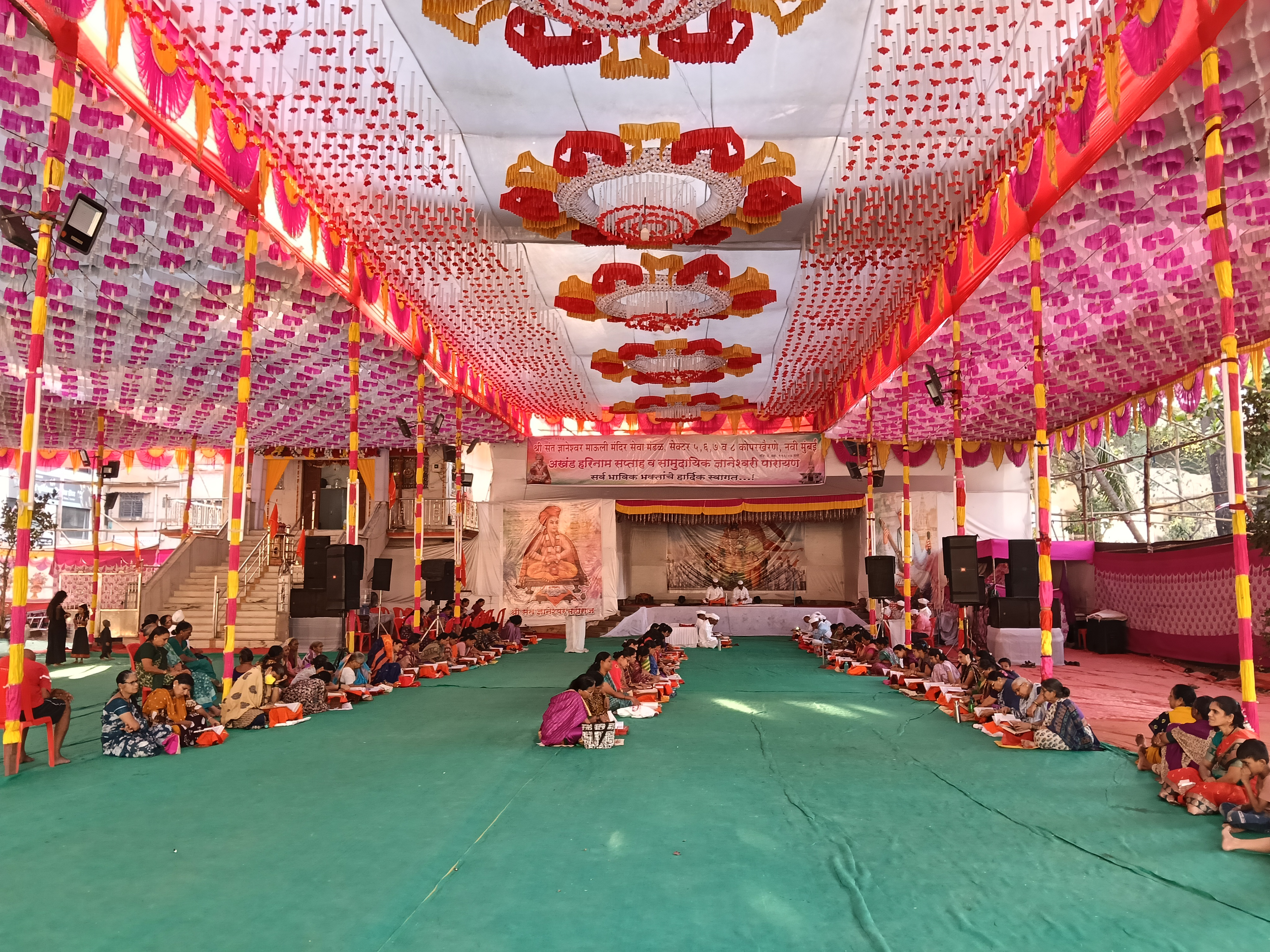
- View of an Akhand Harinam Saptah at Annasaheb Garden in Koparkhairane sector 8 of Navi Mumbai
- Type: A week-long devotional practice
- Classification: Hinduism
- Deity: Vishnu
- Deity: Vitthala
- Region: Maharashtra
- Other name: Samudayik Dnyaneshwari Parayan

Akhand Harinam Saptah (Marathi: अखंड हरिनाम सप्ताह) is a week-long devotional program dedicated to Vishnu in Hinduism often organised in the state of Maharashtra in India. It includes devotional singing, bhajans, kirtans, and readings of saintly literature. It is the part of Varkari tradition in the region. During the devotional event, Harinaam is chanted majorly. Several Marathi devotional songs dedicated to Vishnu and his incarnation Vithoba are sung by the devotees.

The week-long devotional program is divided into several rituals and procedures. It includes Kakada Bhajan, Dnyaneshwari Parayan, Gatha Bhajan, Shrimad Bhagwat Katha, Haripath, Kirtan Sohala, and Harijagar, etc.
