= Deglur =

Deglur Ancient Devapur
- City
- Location in Maharashtra, India
- Coordinates: 18°32′52″N 77°34′38″E
- Country: India
- State: Maharashtra
- District: Nanded

Government
  - Type: Municipal Council

Population (2011)
  - Total: 54,493
- Demonym: Degloorkar[Deglurkar]

Languages
  - Official: Marathi
- Time zone: UTC+5:30 (IST)
- PIN: 431717
- Telephone code: 02463
- Vehicle registration: MH 26

Deglur (also locally known as Degloor) is a city and a municipal council in Nanded district in the state of Maharashtra, India. It is the largest tehsil of Nanded and is known for its socio-cultural history. The town was once part of erstwhile Nizam's Hyderabad state. The town is situated on the river Lendi. Deglur has been historically known as a marketplace. apart from this most of the people from bordering towns in Telangana come to Deglur for their essential services, like medicine.

== Geography ==
Deglur is situated near where the Telangana, Maharashtra and Karnataka boundaries meet. The Telangana-Maharashtra state boundary is around 1.5 kilometres (0.93 mi) away from the city center. The town borders several villages, including Taakli (North), Kawalgaon (West-South) and Mirzapur (East-South). It is nearby the states of Telangana and Karnataka, and as a result people here can speak fluent Telugu and Kannada along with Marathi.

== Economy ==
The primary occupation is agriculture (particularly farming), with output being predominantly sugarcane, cotton, grains and bananas. The town is also known for its cloth market and gold jewellery.

== Demography ==
As of the 2011 India census, Deglur has a population of 54,493, with males accounting for 51% of the population. Deglur City has an average literacy rate of 79%, lower than the national average of 82%, of which the male literacy rate is 86% and the female literacy rate is 72%. In Degloor, 14% of the population are under 6 years of age.

== Attractions ==
The Hemadpanthi Temple (informally named Hottal), is a tourist attraction in the region. The Karadkhed Dam is near the town of Deglur. Rampur lake is situated near degloor city its distance from city is just 2 km . Varakari Shree Dhunda Maharaj Temple.

== See also ==
- Deglur Taluka
- Deglur (Vidhan Sabha constituency)
