= Mukhed =

- city
- Nickname: Mohanavati Nagar
- Location in Maharashtra, India
- Coordinates: 18.700806°N 77.362847°E
- Country: India
- State: Maharashtra
- District: Nanded

Population (2011)
  - Total: 27,650
- Demonym: Mukhedkar

Languages
  - Official: Marathi
- Time zone: UTC+5:30 (IST)
- PIN: 431715
- Vehicle registration: MH-26
- Website: http://www.mukhed.com/

Mukhed is a municipal council in Nanded district in the Indian state of Maharashtra.

== History ==
The historical name of this city was 'Mohanavati Nagar'. There is a fable about this name change. There was strong belief among native peoples that this city was "enchanted". Once any person visited this city, they would be enchanted, and, as result, not be able to easily leave. The name Mohanavati means bewitch. The current name of the city is Mukhed.

Mukhed has a temple dedicated to Veerbhadra, a son of Shiva. Veerbhadra is the Gram Daivat (town/village deity). Another temple is that of Shri Dashratheshwar, built in the 12th century during the reign of Vikramaditya Chalukya.

== Demographics ==
As of 2011 India census, Mukhed had a population of 27,650.

== Transport ==
Mukhed is about 75 km from Nanded this distance is via Narsi - Naigoan-kahala to Nanded city, travel time to Mukhed from Nanded takes about 90 minute by public transport, and there is no train service.Nowadays one new highway is under construction, which is going through Kautha- usman Nagar - Nanded.

== Mukhed Taluka ==
Total population of Mukhed Taluka is more than 250,000 in 46,556 Houses, Spread across total 253 villages and 129 panchayats. While Mukhed town has population more than 27,000.

== See also ==
- Jamb, one of major village in Mukhed taluka. Pala is also major village in mukhed
