= Biloli =

- city
- Location in Maharashtra, India
- Coordinates: 18.77°N 77.73°E
- Country: India
- State: Maharashtra
- District: Nanded
- Elevation: 347 m (1,138 ft)

Population (2001)
  - Total: 13,430

Languages
  - Official: Marathi
- Time zone: UTC+5:30 (IST)
- Vehicle registration: MH 26

Biloli is a city and a municipal council in Nanded district in the state of Maharashtra, India.

Earlier, Biloli covered the areas of present day Dharmabad & Naigaon but now these two are separated from Biloli.

== Geography ==
Biloli is located at 18.77°N 77.73°E. It has an average elevation of 347 metres (1138 feet).

== Demographics ==
As of 2001 India census, Biloli had a population of 13,430. Males constitute 52% of the population and females 48%. Biloli has an average literacy rate of 57%, lower than the national average of 59.5%; with male literacy of 65% and female literacy of 48%. 17% of the population is under 6 years of age. The famous temple of Goddess Saraswati ( Basar ) is only 32 km away from the town.

== See also ==
- Bilolsai taluka
