= Himayatnagar taluka =

Area in India

Coordinates: 19.4263689°N 77.8688816°E

Himayatnagar taluka is a taluka in Nanded district in the state of Maharashtra, India.

== Demographics ==
Religions in Himayatnagar taluk (2011)
Religion	Percent
Hinduism	77.01%
Islam	11.89%
Buddhism	10.33%
Other or not stated	0.77%

At the time of the 2011 census, Himayatnagar taluk had 22,669 households and a population of 109,727. Himayatnagar taluk had a sex ratio of 948 females per 1000 males and a literacy rate of 72.48%. 16,339 (14.89%) were under 6 years of age. Scheduled Castes and Scheduled Tribes made up 13.73% and 16.89% of the population respectively.

Languages of Himayatnagar taluk (2011)
1. Marathi (79.2%)
2. Urdu (8.38%)
3. Lambadi (7.83%)
4. Hindi (3.45%)
5. Others (1.09%)

At the time of the 2011 census, 79.25% of the population spoke Marathi, 8.38% Urdu, 7.83% Lambadi and 3.45% Hindi as their first language.
