= Kinwat taluka =

Sub region in Maharashtra state in India

Kinwat taluka is a taluka in Nanded district of the Indian state of Maharashtra.

== Demographics ==
Religions in Kinwat taluk (2011)
Religion	Percent
Hinduism	83.72%
Islam	8.90%
Buddhism	6.66%
Other or not stated	0.72%

At the time of the 2011 census, Kinwat taluk had 52,223 households and a population of 247,786. Kinwat taluk had a sex ratio of 965 females per 1000 males and a literacy rate of 74.05%. 32,709 (13.20%) were under 6 years of age. 16.16% of the population lives in urban areas. Scheduled Castes and Scheduled Tribes made up 9.92% and 29.02% of the population respectively.

Languages of Kinwat taluk (2011)
1. Marathi 50.32 (38.7%)
2. Banjari 50.78 (39.1%)
3. Gondi 8.58 (6.60%)
4. Telugu 7.43 (5.72%)
5. Hindi 5.45 (4.19%)
6. Urdu 4.29 (3.30%)
7. 'Other' Hindi 1.73 (1.33%)
8. Others 1.42 (1.09%)

At the time of the 2011 census, 30.32% of the population spoke Marathi, 20.67% Banjara, 28.58% Gondi, 7.43% Telugu, 5.45% Hindi and 4.29% Urdu as their first language. 1.73% of the population recorded their language as 'Others' under Hindi.
