= Nanded district =

Coordinates: 19°09′36″N 77°19′12″E

- District of Maharashtra
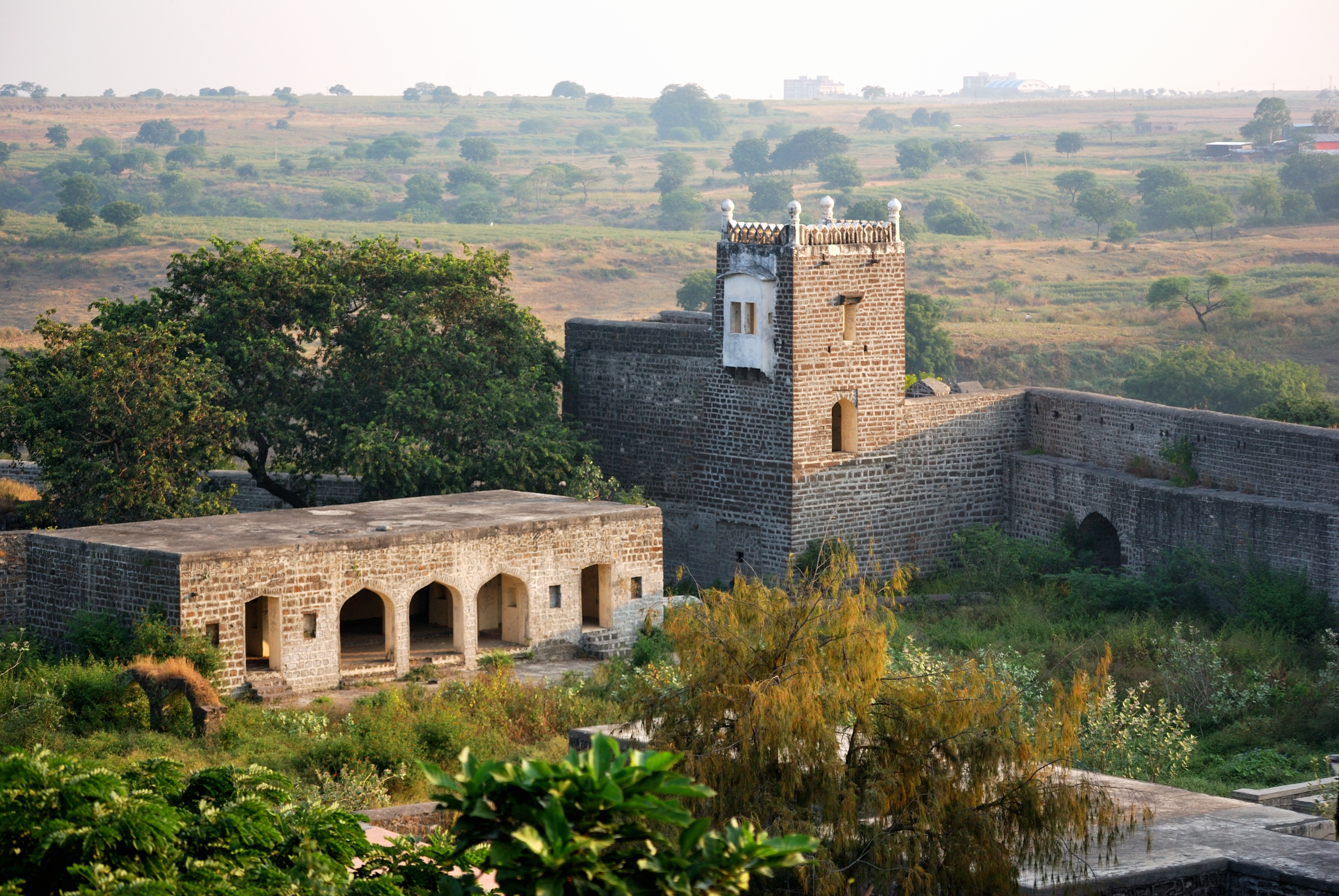
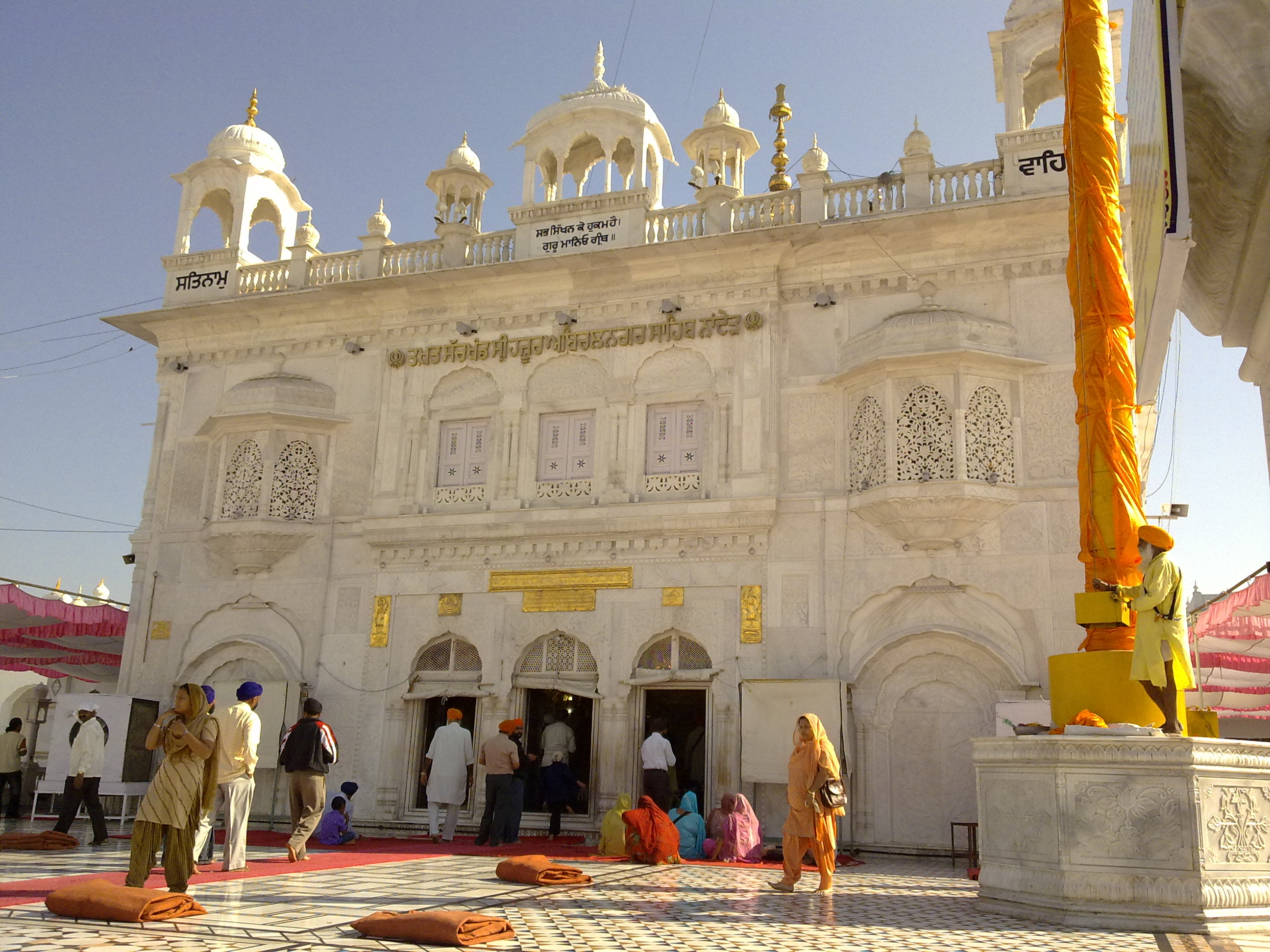
- Top: Kandhar Fort; Bottom: Hazur Sahib, Nanded
- Nickname: "District of Sanskrit Poets"
- Location in Maharashtra
- Nanded district
- Country: India
- State: Maharashtra
- Division: Chhatrapati Sambhajinagar
- Established: 1947
- Headquarters: Nanded
- Tehsils: List: 1. Ardhapur, 2. Bhokar, 3. Biloli, 4. Degloor, 5. Kinwat, 6. Loha, 7. Mahur, 8. Mudkhed, 9. Dharmabad, 10. Mukhed, 11. Hadgaon, 12. Nanded, 13. Himayatnagar, 14. Naigaon, 15. Kandhar, 16. Umri

Government
  - Type: District Council (Janpad Panchayat)
  - Body: Nanded Zilha Parishad
  - Guardian Minister: Atul Save (Cabinet Minister MH)
  - Zilla Parishad, Nanded: President [Vacant]; Vice President [Vacant]
  - DM cum Collector: Shri. Rahul Kardile (IAS)
  - CEO, Zilla Parishad: Ms. Meghana Kawali, IAS
  - DFO cum Conservator: Keshav Wabale, IFS
  - Superintendent of Police: Mr. Abinash Kumar, IPS

Area
  - Total: 10,528 km^{2} (4,065 sq mi)

Population (2011)
  - Total: 3,361,292
  - Density: 319.27/km^{2} (826.91/sq mi)
  - Urban: 27.19 %

Demographics
  - Literacy: 75.45%
  - Sex ratio: 943
- Time zone: UTC+05:30 (IST)
- PIN: 431601
- Vehicle registration: MH-26
- Major highways: NH-222, National Highway 204, National Highway 361, National Highway 61
- Average annual precipitation: 954 mm
- Per capita income(Nanded district): INR 1,22,767 (2019-20)
- Nominal gross domestic product(Nanded district): INR 50,020crores (2019-20)
- Website: nanded.nic.in

Nanded district (Marathi pronunciation: [naːn̪d̪eɖ]) is a district of Maharashtra state in central India. The city of Nanded is the district headquarters.

== History ==
Nanded has been mentioned in historical accounts since the 1st century. Upon the reorganization of states in 1956, the district of Nanded came to comprise six talukas: Kandhar, Hadgaon, Biloli, Degloor and Mudhol whereas Mukhed and Bhokar were designated as Mahals (revenue headquarters). As a result of the reorganization, Bichkunda and Jukkal villages of Degloor taluka, as well as the entire Mudhol taluka (excluding Dharmabad), were merged with Nizamabad District of Telangana. In exchange, Kinwat and Islapur villages were separated from Adilabad District and incorporated into Nanded District. Islapur village was combined with Kinwat taluka, and Dharmabad came to be merged with Biloli taluka.

== Culture ==
Nanded is mentioned in the Ramayana, as the place where Bharat's mother came from. Mahur fort was a major fort in ancient times. In Mahur, the Goddess Renuka temple is the major attraction for pilgrims. It is part of the Saade Teen Shaktipeeth (three and a half seats of power of the deity). There are many temples in Mahur viz Datta & Lord Parashuram temples. Kedarguda Temple in Hadgaon district is dedicated to Lord Kedarnath, known for Devrai (the forest dedicated to God). Another ancient Temple at Gaitond (mouth of cow) in Hadgaon taluka of Nanded district dedicated to Lord Shiva is a pilgrimage site. There are three historical forts in Nanded district namely Mahurgarh, Nandgiri and Kandhar fort.

The Sahasrakund Waterfall located at Islapur village, Kinwat is a favourite destination for tourists during the monsoon. Hot water springs with containing sulphur and phosphate are believed to have medicinal properties. Unkeshwar village in Kinwat taluka has a Shiva temple. Malegaon Yatra dedicated to Lord Khandoba in Loha taluka is considered one of biggest in India. The 10th and last living guru of Sikhs, Guru Gobind Singh spent his last days and here he transferred the title of Guru to "Aad Granth" as "Guru Granth Sahib". A gurdwara was built on the site of Guru Gobind Singh's cremation. The gurdwara is part of the Hazur Sahib.

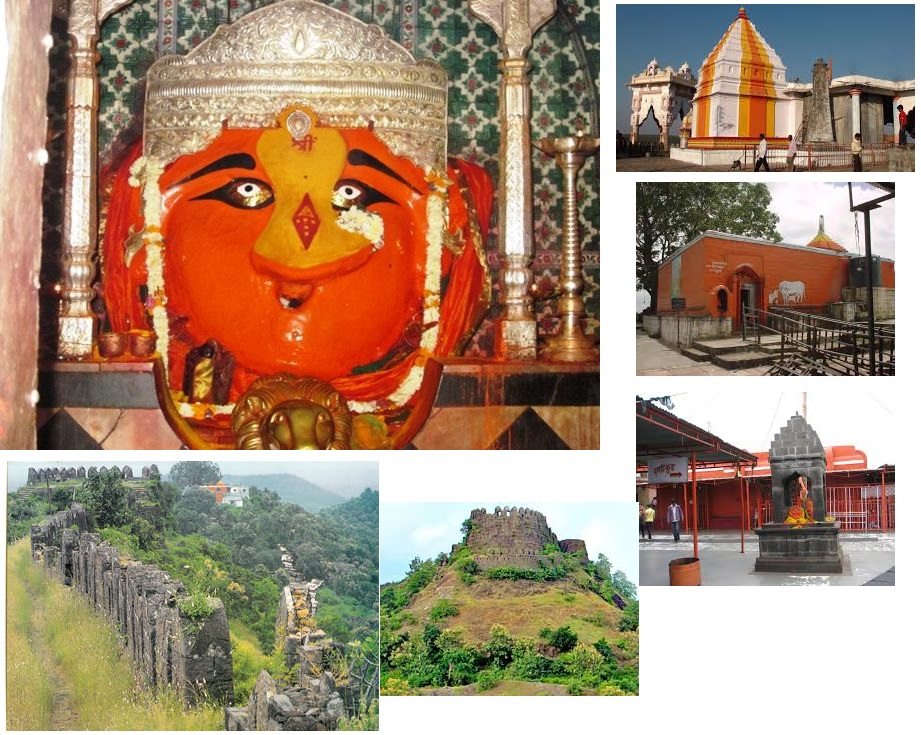
Temples and forts in Mahur, Nanded district

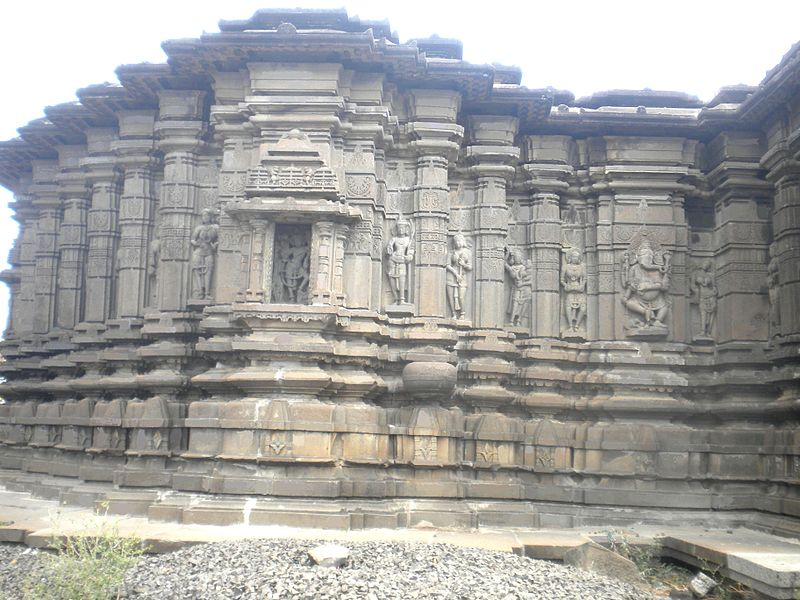
Sidhheshwar Temple near Hottal, Nanded district

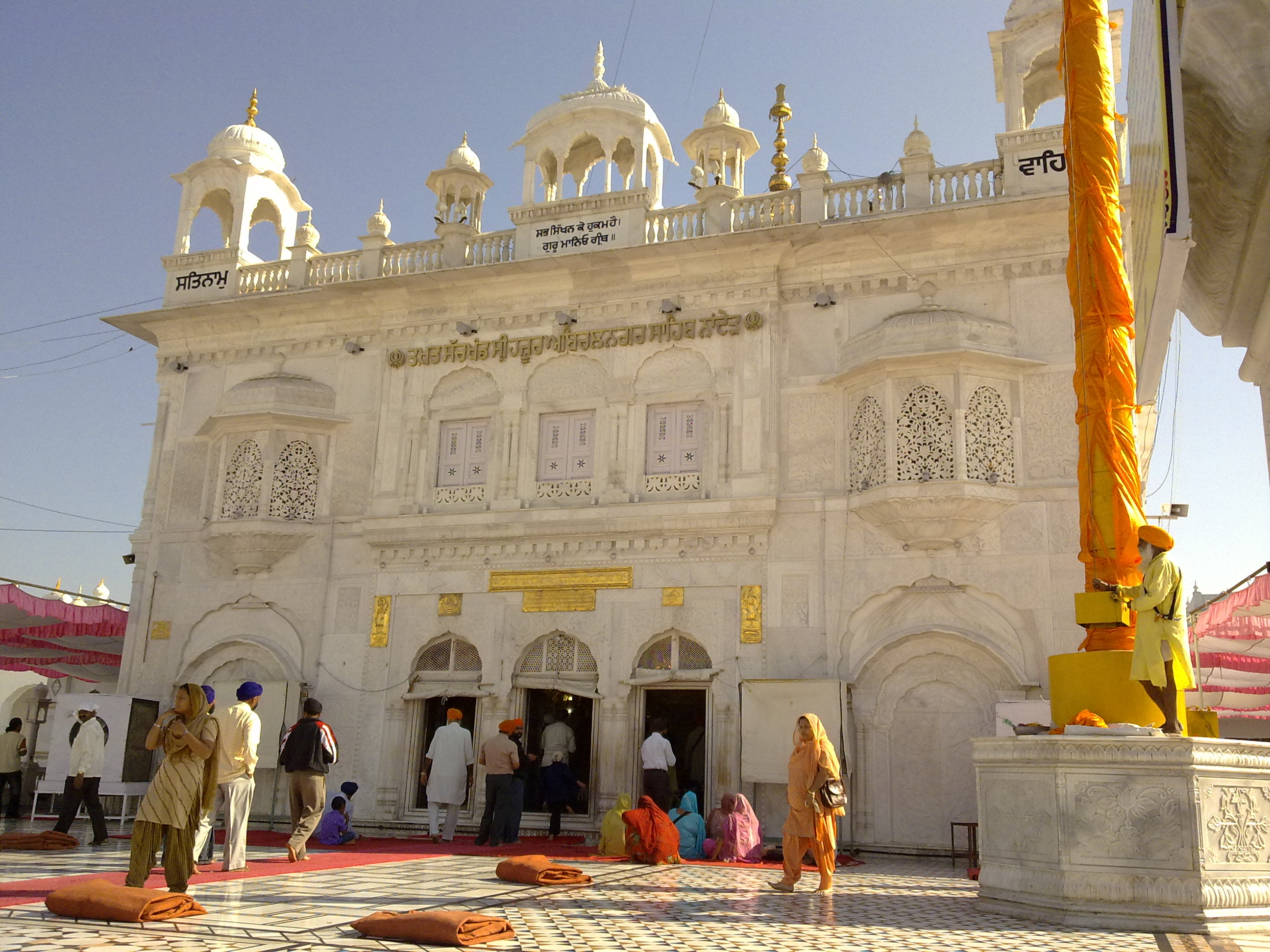
Hazur Sahib, a Sikh shrine located in the Nanded city

== Geography ==
The district of Nanded lies between 180 15' to 190 55' North latitudes and 770 to 78025' East longitudes. It covers an area of 10,332 sq km. Nanded District lies in the eastern part of Maharashtra state as well as the eastern portion of Marathwada region, which corresponds to Chhatrapati Sambhajinagar Division.

Nanded is bounded on the north by Yavatmal district of the Vidarbha region, with Latur on south-west, Parbhani and Hingoli districts on the west. On the eastern side lies Adilabad, Nirmal, Nizamabad and Kamareddy districts of Telangana state, and on the south lies Bidar of Karnataka state. The area presents undulating topography with uneven hills, plateau, gentle slopes and valley planes.

The Godavari River flows through the district. Physio-graphically, the district can be divided into 2 major parts, the hilly region on the North and North East and low-lying area on the banks of the rivers Godavari, Manjra, Manyad, Penganga.

== Demographics ==
Historical population
Year	Pop.	±% p.a.
1901	550,261	—
1911	671,066	+2.00%
1921	649,825	−0.32%
1931	706,773	+0.84%
1941	784,289	+1.05%
1951	883,531	+1.20%
1961	1,079,674	+2.03%
1971	1,397,762	+2.62%
1981	1,749,334	+2.27%
1991	2,330,374	+2.91%
2001	2,876,259	+2.13%
2011	3,361,292	+1.57%

Religions in Nanded district (2011)
Religion	Percent
Hinduism	74.43%
Islam	14.04%
Buddhism	10.54%
Sikhism	0.40%
Other or not stated	0.59%

According to the 2011 census, the district has an area of 10,502 km^{2} and its population is 3,361,292 of which 27.19% were urban. roughly equal to the nation of Uruguay or the US state of Connecticut. This gives it a ranking of 99th in India (out of a total of 640). The district has a population density of 319 inhabitants per square kilometre (830/sq mi) . Its population growth rate over the decade 2001-2011 was 16.7%. Nanded has a sex ratio of 937 females for every 1000 males, and a literacy rate of 76.94%. 27.19% of the population live in urban areas. Scheduled Castes and Scheduled Tribes make up 19.05% and 8.38% of the population respectively.

=== Languages ===
Languages of Nanded district (2011)
1. Marathi (75.5%)
2. Urdu (9.63%)
3. Hindi (5.36%)
4. Lambadi (5.23%)
5. Telugu (2.10%)
6. Others (2.22%)

At the time of the 2011 Census of India, 75.46% of the population in the district spoke Marathi, 9.63% Urdu, 5.36% Hindi, 5.23% Lambadi and 2.10% Telugu as their first language. Urdu is mainly concentrated in Nanded city, while Gondi is mainly in Mahur and Kinwat taluks.

== Economy ==
In 2006 the Ministry of Panchayati Raj named Nanded one of the country's 250 most backward districts (out of a total of 640). It is one of the twelve districts in Maharashtra currently receiving funds from the Backward Regions Grant Fund Programme (BRGF).

Industrial Estates are located in Nanded, Dharmabad, Loha, Degloor, Kinwat, Krushnoor (SEZ).

== Governance ==
=== Members of Parliament ===
- Ravindra Vasantrao Chavan (INC)
  (Nanded)
- Shivaji Bandappa Kalge (INC)
  (Latur)
- Nagesh Bapurao Patil Ashtikar (Shiv Sena - UBT)
  (Hingoli)

=== Guardian Minister ===
Guardian Minister for Nanded District
- पालकमंत्री-नांदेड जिल्हा करीता
- Emblem of Maharashtra
- Incumbent; Atul Save since 24 September 2022
- Style: The Honourable
- Appointer: Chief Minister of Maharashtra
- Term length: 5 years / No time limit
- Website: mumbaicity.gov.in/en/

==== List of Guardian Minister ====
Name	Term of office
Diwakar Raote	1995-1999
Ashok Chavan	1999-2008
Ravisheth Patil	2008-2009
Subhash Zanak	2009-2010
D. P. Sawant	2010-2014
Ramdas Kadam	31 October 2014 - 8 November 2019
Ashok Chavan	9 January 2020 - 29 June 2022
Girish Mahajan	24 September 2022 - 23 November 2024
Atul Moreshwar Sawe	20 January 2025 - Incumbent

== Education ==
- Swami Ramanand Teerth Marathwada University (SRTMU), located in Nanded, was established in 1994 as a state public university of Maharashtra state.
- Dr. Shankarrao Chavan Government Medical College
- Shri Guru Gobind Singhji Institute of Engineering and Technology

== Administration ==
=== District Collectorate ===
District Magistrate / Collector, Nanded
- जिल्हाधिकारी तथा जिल्हादंडाधिकारी, नांदेड
- Emblem of India
- Incumbent; Shri. Rahul Kardile (IAS) since 2025
- Residence: Civil Lines, Nanded
- Appointer: Government of Maharashtra
- Term length: 3 yrs. (Only once)
- Website: nanded.gov.in/en/

==== List of District Collector ====
Name	Term of office
Radheshyaam Mopalwar	2001-2004
Dr. Deepak Mhaisekar	2004-2008
Shrikar Pardeshi	2008 - 2012
Dhiraj Kumar	2012-2014
Suresh Kakani	2014-2016
Arun Dongare	2016-2018
Dr. Vipin (Itankar)	2020 - 2023
Dr. Abhijeet Raut	2023 - 2025, February 5
Rahul Kardile	6 February 2025 - Incumbent

=== Superintendent of Police ===
District Superintendent of Police, Nanded
- जिल्हा पोलीस अधीक्षक, नांदेड
- Incumbent; Shri. Nilabh Rohan (IPS) since 2024
- Residence: Police Headquarters, Nanded
- Appointer: Government of Maharashtra
- Term length: 3 yrs. (Only once)
- Website: nanded.gov.in/en/

==== List of District SP's ====
Name	Term of office
Fattesinh Patil	2001-2004
Dr. Manojkumar Sharma	2004-2008
Dr. Sandip Karnik	2008 - 2012
	2012-2014
	2014-2016
Meena	2016-2018
Shrikrishna Kokate	2020 - 2023
Ravindrasingh Pardeshi	2023 - 2025, February 5
Abinash Kumar	6 February 2025 -
Nilabh Rohan	Incumbent

== Notable people ==
- Vaman Pandit, a Marathi scholar and a poet.
- Guru Gobind Singh, the last 10 Sikh Guru who died in Nanded.
- Banda Singh Bahadur, the Sikh military commander.
- Shankarrao Chavan, the former Chief minister and former Home minister of Maharashtra state.
- Ashok Chavan, former Chief Minister of Maharashtra state and current Member of Parliament (Rajya Sabha).
- Syed Sadatullah Husaini, president (Amir) of Jamaat-e-Islami Hind (JIH), Vice President of All India Muslim Personal Law Board.
- Vasantrao Balwantrao Chavan, former Member of Parliament.
- Kamalkishor Kadam, a former minister of education.
- Nagnath Lalujirao Kottapalle, former Vice-chancellor of BAMU, an educationalist and an author.
- Datta Bhagat, an Ambedkarite author.
- Vivek Ram Chaudhari, Chief of the Air Force (India).

== See also ==
- Make in Maharashtra
- Marathwada
- Wajegaon
