= By-elections to the 18th Lok Sabha =

Indian parliamentary byelections since 2024

By-elections to the 18th Lok Sabha are held to fill vacancies in Lok Sabha, the lower house of the bicameral Parliament of India between 24 June 2024 and the next Indian general election.

== Condition of by-election ==
As per the Representation of People Act, 1951, a seat in the parliament may fall vacant in the cases of

- death
- resignation
- defection
- ineligibility to hold office

A by-election is called for a vacant seat shall be called only when the date of vacancy is at least 1 year apart from the date of dissolution of the house.

A by-election is, by law, held within 6 months from the date of vacancy unless the Election Commission of India finds it impossible to conduct elections, in which case a government approval is required. Elections are also delayed due to unresolved petitions left in the court on validity of last election held.

== By-elections to the 18th Lok Sabha ==
	Constituency	State/UT	Date of vacancy	Cause of vacancy	Date of election	Before election		After election	
	Constituency	State/UT	Date of vacancy	Cause of vacancy	Date of election	Member	Party	Member	Party
1	Wayanad	Kerala	18 Jun 2024	Resignation	13 Nov 2024	Rahul Gandhi	INC	Priyanka Gandhi	INC
2	Nanded	Maharashtra	26 Aug 2024	Death	20 Nov 2024	Vasantrao Balwantrao Chavan	INC	Ravindra Vasantrao Chavan	INC
3	Nagaon	Assam	18 Mar 2026	Resignation	6 Oct 2026	Pradyut Bordoloi	INC	Devasish Sharma	BJP
4	Basirhat	West Bengal	25 Sep 2024	Death	TBD	Haji Nurul Islam	AITC	TBD	
5	Shillong	Meghalaya	19 Feb 2026	Death	TBD	Ricky AJ Syngkon	VPP	TBD	
6	Srinagar	Jammu and Kashmir	3 Nov 2026	Resignation	TBD	Aga Syed Ruhullah Mehdi	JKNC	TBD	

== Cause of vacancies ==
=== Wayanad, Kerala ===
2024 Wayanad by-election
- 13 November 2024

Wayanad constituency
- Turnout: 64.22% ▼9.35%
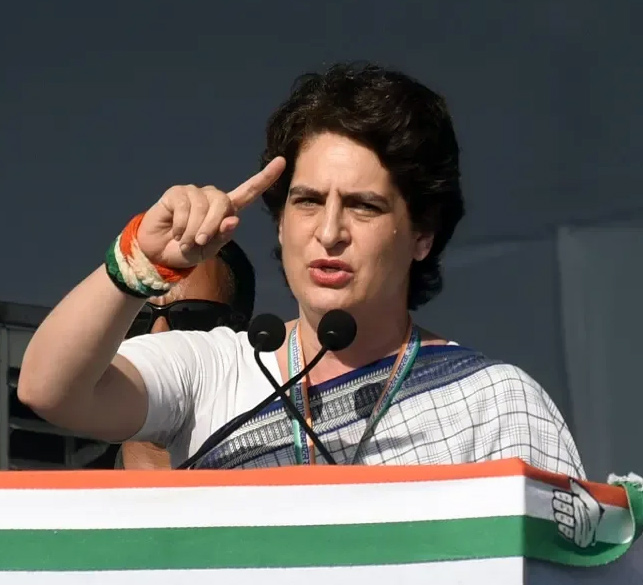

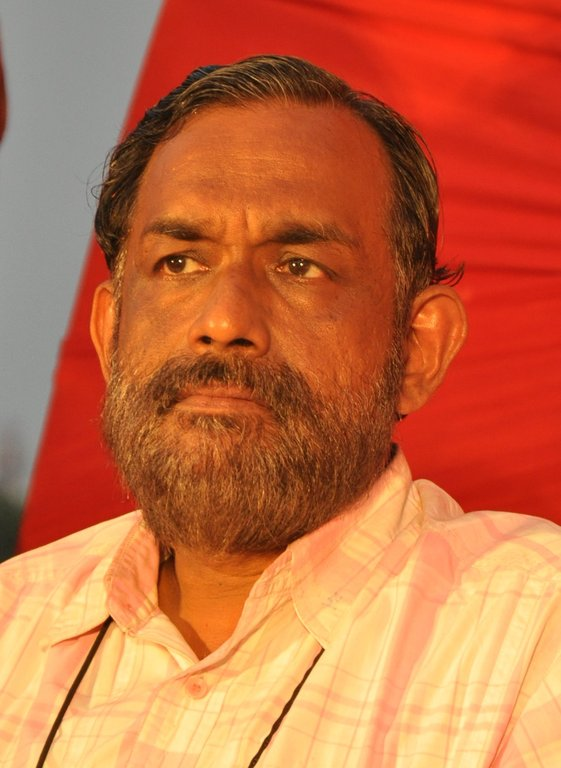

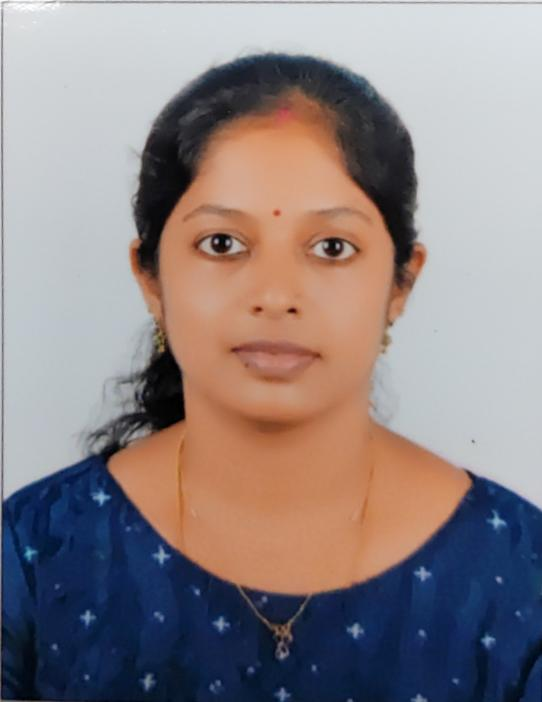
	First party	Second party	Third party
Candidate	Priyanka Gandhi	Sathyan Mokeri	Navya Haridas
Party	INC	CPI	BJP
Popular vote	6,22,338	2,11,407	1,09,939
Percentage	64.99%	22.08%	11.48
Swing	▲5.30%	▼4.01%	▼1.51%
MP before election
Rahul Gandhi
INC
Elected MP
Priyanka Gandhi
INC

As per section 33 (7) of the Representation of People Act, 1951, a member may contest from 2 constituencies but not represent both of them in the parliament. As Rahul Gandhi contested elections from Raebareli as well as Wayanad, he had to vacate one, which he decided to be Raebareli and hence resigned from Wayanad. Elections were expected to be held alongside other states in August but due to major landslides in the constituency, the elections got delayed till 13 November 2024.

2024 Wayanad by-election
Party	Candidate	Votes	%	±%
INC	Priyanka Gandhi	622,338	64.99	▲5.3
CPI	Sathyan Mokeri	2,11,407	22.08	▼4.01
BJP	Navya Haridas	1,09,939	11.48	▼1.51
NOTA	None of the above	5,406	0.57	▼0.5
Majority		4,10,931	42.9	▲9.32
Turnout		9,57,571	64.22	▼9.35
INC hold		Swing	▲5.3	

=== Nanded, Maharashtra ===
2024 Nanded by-election
- 20 November 2024

Nanded constituency
- Turnout: 67.81% ▲6.88%
	First party	Second party	Third party
Candidate	Ravindra Vasantrao Chavan	Santukrao Marotrao Hambarde	Avinash Vishvanath Bhosikar
Party	INC	BJP	VBA
Popular vote	5,86,788	5,85,331	80,179
Percentage	44.81%	44.69%	6.12%
Swing	▼2.07%	▲3.08%	▼2.08%
MP before election
Vasantrao Balwantrao Chavan
INC
Elected MP
Ravindra Vasantrao Chavan
INC

As the then representative Vasantrao Balwantrao Chavan peacefully died of old age, his constituency fell vacant. By-elections were held on 20 November 2024. INC managed to retain the seat by a very narrow margin of 1,457 votes (0.12%) over the BJP candidate. This was a significant drop from the general election in the seat held just 6 months ago.

2024 Nanded by-election
Party	Candidate	Votes	%	±%
INC	Ravindra Vasantrao Chavan	586,788	44.81	▼2.07
BJP	Dr. Santukrao Marotrao Hambarde	5,85,331	44.69	▲3.08
VBA	Avinash Vishwanath Bhosikar	80,179	6.12	▼2.08
NOTA	None of the above	2,911	0.22	▼0.10
Majority		1,457	0.12	▼5.15
Turnout		13,09,620	67.81	▲6.88
INC hold		Swing	▼2.07	

=== Nagaon, Assam ===
2026 Nagaon by-election
- 6 October 2026

Nagaon constituency
- Turnout: 76.19% ▼8.96%
	First party	Second party	Third party
Candidate	Devasish Sharma	Badruddin Ajmal	Sibamoni Bora
Party	BJP	AIUDF	INC
Popular vote	714,349	572,125	129,492
Percentage	49.12%	39.34%	8.90%
Swing	▲11.92%	▲30.48%	▼41.99%
MP before election
Pradyut Bordoloi
INC
Elected MP
Devasish Sharma
BJP

Pradyut Bordoloi, the then representative of Nagaon Lok Sabha Constituency as a member of Indian National Congress, defected to Bharatiya Janata Party. To avoid his suspension through anti-defection law, he resigned from the Lok Sabha right before his meeting with Home Minister and senior BJP politician Amit Shah.

BJP candidate and retired IAS officer Devasish Sharma won the election defeating All India United Democratic Front chief Badruddin Ajmal by a margin of over 142, 000 votes. The Indian National Congress, which had previously held this seat failed to retain its security deposit as Sibamoni Bora got just 8.9% of the votes polled.

2026 Nagaon by-election: Nagaon
Party	Candidate	Votes	%	±%
BJP	Devasish Sharma	714,349	49.12	▲11.92
AIUDF	Badruddin Ajmal	572,125	39.34	▲30.48
INC	Sibamoni Bora	129,492	8.90	▼41.99
NOTA	None of the above	9,244	0.64	▼0.13
Majority		142,224	9.78	▼3.91
Turnout		1,454,380	76.19	▼8.96
Registered electors		1,817,204		
BJP gain from INC		Swing		

=== Basirhat, West Bengal ===
2026 Basirhat by-election
- TBA

Basirhat constituency
MP before election
Haji Nurul Islam
AITC
Elected MP
TBA

Haji Nurul Islam, the then representative of Basirhat Lok Sabha Constituency, failed to fight cancer which ultimately led to his death on 25 September 2024 at the age of 61. Due to pending election petition not answered yet by Calcutta High Court, the elections are delayed until High Court either gives a verdict or allows election to take place before the verdict.

=== Shillong, Meghalaya ===
2026 Shillong by-election
- TBA

Shillong constituency
MP before election
Ricky AJ Syngkon
Voice of the People Party
Elected MP
TBA

Ricky AJ Syngkon, the then representative of Shillong Lok Sabha Constituency, died on 19 February 2026 at 54 years of age due to suffering a cardiac arrest while playing football at the outskirts of his constituency. By-election must take place no later than 18 August 2026.
