= Mukhed Assembly constituency =

Constituency of the Maharashtra legislative assembly in India

Coordinates: 18.71°N 77.37°E

Mukhed
- Constituency No. 91 for the Maharashtra Legislative Assembly

Constituency details
- Country: India
- Region: Western India
- State: Maharashtra
- District: Nanded
- Lok Sabha constituency: Nanded
- Established: 1962
- Total electors: 307,713
- Reservation: None

Member of Legislative Assembly
- 15th Maharashtra Legislative Assembly
- Incumbent Tushar Rathod
- Party: Bharatiya Janata Party
- Elected year: 2024

Mukhed Assembly constituency is one of the 288 Vidhan Sabha (legislative assembly) constituencies of Maharashtra state, western India. This constituency is located in Nanded district. The boundaries of the constituency were changed in 2008.

== Geographical scope ==
As per the 2008 delimitation there are nine assembly constituencies in Nanded district, viz. Kinwat, Hadgaon, Bhokar, Nanded North, Nanded South, Loha, Naigaon, Deglur and Mukhed. The constituency comprises Mukhed taluka and Revenue circles Pethwadaj and Kurla belonging to Kandhar taluka.

== Members of Legislative Assembly ==
Year	Member	Party
1978	Madhukarrao Rangojirao Ghate	Independent
1980	Nagnathrao Ravangaonkar	Indian National Congress (U)
1985	Madhukarrao Rangojirao Ghate	Indian National Congress
1990	Madhukarrao Rangojirao Ghate	Indian National Congress
1995	Avinash Madhukarrao Ghate	Indian National Congress
1999	Subhash Sabne	Shiv Sena
2004	Subhash Sabne	Shiv Sena
2009	Hanmantrao Betmogrekar Patil	Indian National Congress
2014	Govind Rathod	Bharatiya Janata Party
2015^	Tushar Rathod	Bharatiya Janata Party
2019	Tushar Rathod	Bharatiya Janata Party
2024	Tushar Rathod	Bharatiya Janata Party

== Election results ==
=== Assembly Election 2024 ===
2024 Maharashtra Legislative Assembly election : Mukhed
Party	Candidate	Votes	%	±%
BJP	Dr. Tushar Govindrao Rathod	98,213	45.05	▼10.41
INC	Hanmantrao Patil Betmogrekar	60,429	27.72	▼10.51
Independent	Balaji Patil Khatgaonkar	48,235	22.13	New
VBA	Raosaheb Digambarrao Patil	4,700	2.16	▼2.58
PHJSP	Rahul Raju Navande	1,660	0.76	New
Independent	Santosh Bhagwan Rathod	1,582	0.73	New
NOTA	None of the Above	557	0.26	▼0.33
Margin of victory		37,784	17.33	▲0.10
Turnout		218,554	71.03	▲5.54
Total valid votes		217,997		
Registered electors		307,713		▲8.66
BJP hold		Swing	▼10.41	

=== Assembly Election 2019 ===
2019 Maharashtra Legislative Assembly election : Mukhed
Party	Candidate	Votes	%	±%
BJP	Dr. Tushar Govindrao Rathod	102,573	55.46	▼8.53
INC	Bhausaheb Khushalrao Patil	70,710	38.23	▲4.38
VBA	Jivan Vithalrao Daregawe	8,756	4.73	New
SBP	Balaji Janardhan Aaglave	1,683	0.91	New
BSP	Jitendra Dashrath Waghmare	1,218	0.66	New
NOTA	None of the Above	1,074	0.58	▼0.03
Margin of victory		31,863	17.23	▼12.91
Turnout		186,115	65.72	▲9.59
Total valid votes		184,940		
Registered electors		283,183		▲0.66
BJP hold		Swing	▼8.53	

=== Assembly By-election 2015 ===
2015 Maharashtra Legislative Assembly by-election : Mukhed
Party	Candidate	Votes	%	±%
BJP	Dr. Tushar Govindrao Rathod	100,319	64.00	▼3.58
INC	P. M. V. Betmogarekar	53,071	33.86	▲7.98
IUML	A. Hafijsahab	1,145	0.73	New
NOTA	None of the Above	965	0.62	▼0.35
Independent	A. T. Sirse	962	0.61	New
Margin of victory		47,248	30.14	▼11.55
Turnout		157,719	56.06	▼8.21
Total valid votes		156,754		
Registered electors		281,325		▲2.31
BJP hold		Swing	▼3.58	

=== Assembly Election 2014 ===
2014 Maharashtra Legislative Assembly election : Mukhed
Party	Candidate	Votes	%	±%
BJP	Govind Mukkaji Rathod	118,781	67.57	New
INC	Betmogrekar Hanmantrao Venkatrao Patil	45,490	25.88	▼15.29
SS	Lohbande Venkat Mangaji	3,930	2.24	▼7.44
BSP	Deshmukh Balasaheb Gangadharrao	2,466	1.40	New
NOTA	None of the Above	1,693	0.96	New
NCP	Pole Ramchandra Kashiram	1,141	0.65	New
Margin of victory		73,291	41.70	▲40.94
Turnout		177,558	64.58	▼2.29
Total valid votes		175,777		
Registered electors		274,960		▲13.56
BJP gain from INC		Swing	▲26.40	

=== Assembly Election 2009 ===
2009 Maharashtra Legislative Assembly election : Mukhed
Party	Candidate	Votes	%	±%
INC	Patil Hanmanthrao Venketrao	66,013	41.17	▲2.10
Independent	Rathod Govind Makkaji	64,797	40.41	New
SS	Sambutwad Vasant Iranna	15,508	9.67	▼33.00
BBM	Lohbande Dashrath Manghaji	5,252	3.28	▼0.80
Independent	Vilas Ramdas Dhange	2,119	1.32	New
JSS	Pandhare Sudhakar Ramrao	1,895	1.18	New
Independent	Adv. Rahimkhan Mahbubkhan Pathan	1,361	0.85	New
Margin of victory		1,216	0.76	▼2.84
Turnout		160,336	66.22	▼0.53
Total valid votes		160,331		
Registered electors		242,121		▲8.55
INC gain from SS		Swing	▼1.50	

=== Assembly Election 2004 ===
2004 Maharashtra Legislative Assembly election : Mukhed
Party	Candidate	Votes	%	±%
SS	Subhash Piraji Sabne	63,525	42.67	▲4.40
INC	Avinash Madhukarrao Ghate	58,172	39.07	▲2.08
Independent	Balaji Baliram Bande	8,863	5.95	New
RSPS	Ravikar Jagdish Gopalrao	7,336	4.93	New
BBM	Abbasahib Aliej Dasharath Mangaji Lohabande	6,069	4.08	New
BSP	Kanetkar Maroti Vitthalrao	2,045	1.37	New
Ambedkarist Republican Party	Dornalikar Vidyasagar Nagorao	1,470	0.99	New
Margin of victory		5,353	3.60	▲2.32
Turnout		148,892	66.76	▲10.53
Total valid votes		148,874		
Registered electors		223,040		▲23.82
SS hold		Swing	▲4.40	

=== Assembly Election 1999 ===
1999 Maharashtra Legislative Assembly election : Mukhed
Party	Candidate	Votes	%	±%
SS	Subhash Piraji Sabne	38,752	38.27	▲27.00
INC	Avinash Madhukarrao Ghate	37,463	36.99	▲4.68
NCP	Dr. Gaikwad Gunderao Anandrao	17,679	17.46	New
Independent	Hangargekar (Patil) Vishwanath Madhavrao	4,568	4.51	New
Independent	Ghate Chandrakant Nagorao	1,054	1.04	New
Independent	Deshmukh Madhavrao Vishwanath	808	0.80	New
Margin of victory		1,289	1.27	▼2.04
Turnout		109,750	60.93	▼13.83
Total valid votes		101,269		
Registered electors		180,136		▲2.91
SS gain from INC		Swing	▲5.96	

=== Assembly Election 1995 ===
1995 Maharashtra Legislative Assembly election : Mukhed
Party	Candidate	Votes	%	±%
INC	Avinash Madhukarrao Ghate	39,618	32.31	▼9.84
Independent	Patil Gunwant Madhavrao	35,558	29.00	New
Independent	Ravangaonkar Nagnathrao Satwaji	22,209	18.11	New
SS	Sabne Subhash Piraji	13,819	11.27	▼10.86
BBM	Gaikwad Milind Vithal	3,494	2.85	New
BSP	Barhalikar Givindrao Haibatrao	2,278	1.86	▲0.78
JD	Kamble Sopan Lalu	1,587	1.29	▼1.35
Margin of victory		4,060	3.31	▼15.68
Turnout		125,733	71.83	▲15.52
Total valid votes		122,619		
Registered electors		175,039		▲0.32
INC hold		Swing	▼9.84	

=== Assembly Election 1990 ===
1990 Maharashtra Legislative Assembly election : Mukhed
Party	Candidate	Votes	%	±%
INC	Ghate Madhukarrao Rangoji	40,100	42.15	▼5.11
Independent	Patil Vishwanath Nadhavrao	22,033	23.16	New
SS	Khankare Shivraj Kallappa	21,059	22.13	New
BRP	More Sunil Narayanrao	4,096	4.31	New
JD	Pandharinath Narayanrao Waghmare	2,514	2.64	New
Independent	Gaikwad Kondiba Raoji	2,095	2.20	New
BSP	Govindrao Haibatrao Barhalikar	1,028	1.08	New
Margin of victory		18,067	18.99	▼1.49
Turnout		97,087	55.64	▲7.36
Total valid votes		95,145		
Registered electors		174,479		▲24.53
INC hold		Swing	▼5.11	

=== Assembly Election 1985 ===
1985 Maharashtra Legislative Assembly election : Mukhed
Party	Candidate	Votes	%	±%
INC	Ghate Madhukarrao Rangoji	31,238	47.26	New
Independent	Khankare Shivraj Kallappa	17,699	26.78	New
IC(S)	Nagnathrao Satwajirao Rawangaonkar	10,597	16.03	New
Independent	Govindrao Haibatrao Barhaitkar	3,970	6.01	New
Independent	Venkati Malba Talikote	540	0.82	New
Independent	Chandrakant Satwa	492	0.74	New
Margin of victory		13,539	20.48	▲0.17
Turnout		67,335	48.06	▲0.69
Total valid votes		66,097		
Registered electors		140,110		▲8.35
INC gain from INC(U)		Swing	▼11.91	

=== Assembly Election 1980 ===
1980 Maharashtra Legislative Assembly election : Mukhed
Party	Candidate	Votes	%	±%
INC(U)	Ravangaonkar Nagnathrao Satwaji	35,569	59.17	New
INC(I)	Ghate Madhukarrao Rangoji	23,359	38.86	▲28.97
Independent	Subhash Piraji Sabne	1,189	1.98	New
Margin of victory		12,210	20.31	▼0.09
Turnout		61,181	47.31	▼1.97
Total valid votes		60,117		
Registered electors		129,316		▲7.07
INC(U) gain from Independent		Swing	▲16.78	

=== Assembly Election 1978 ===
1978 Maharashtra Legislative Assembly election : Mukhed
Party	Candidate	Votes	%	±%
Independent	Ghate Madhukarrao Rangoji	24,802	42.38	New
Independent	Ravangaonkar Nagnathrao Satwaji	12,864	21.98	New
INC(I)	Barhalikar Govindrao Haibatrao	5,788	9.89	New
PWPI	Gajbhare Rajaram Narharrao	4,558	7.79	New
RPI	Ramchandra Hanmanta	4,387	7.50	▼9
Independent	Jadhav Tukaram Satwaji	4,043	6.91	New
Independent	Sabne Piraji Satwaji	1,695	2.90	New
Margin of victory		11,938	20.40	▼30.14
Turnout		60,100	49.76	▲14.36
Total valid votes		58,520		
Registered electors		120,773		▲40.48
Independent gain from INC		Swing	▼24.66	

=== Assembly Election 1962 ===
1962 Maharashtra Legislative Assembly election : Mukhed
Party	Candidate	Votes	%	±%
INC	Pirhaji Satwa	19,652	67.04	New
RPI	Laxaya Maraya	4,836	16.50	New
Independent	Durgaji Shekoji	2,480	8.46	New
Independent	Khandu Mallu	1,275	4.35	New
Independent	Ganpatrao Manikrao	544	1.86	New
Independent	Kadaknath Lingoji	526	1.79	New
Margin of victory		14,816	50.54	
Turnout		30,842	35.88	
Total valid votes		29,313		
Registered electors		85,969		
INC win (new seat)				
