= Kinwat Assembly constituency =

Constituency of the Maharashtra legislative assembly in India

Coordinates: 19.621°N 78.200°E

Kinwat
- Constituency No. 83 for the Maharashtra Legislative Assembly

Constituency details
- Country: India
- Region: Western India
- State: Maharashtra
- District: Nanded
- Lok Sabha constituency: Hingoli
- Established: 1952
- Total electors: 278,803
- Reservation: None

Member of Legislative Assembly
- 15th Maharashtra Legislative Assembly
- Incumbent Bhimrao Keram
- Party: Bharatiya Janata Party
- Elected year: 2024

Kinwat Assembly constituency is one of the 288 Vidhan Sabha (legislative assembly) constituencies of Maharashtra state, western India. This constituency is located in Nanded district.

== Geographical scope ==
As per the 2008 delimitation there are nine assembly constituencies in Nanded district, viz. Kinwat, Hadgaon, Bhokar, Nanded North, Nanded South, Loha, Naigaon, Deglur and Mukhed. The delimitation of the constituency happened in 2008. It comprises Mahur taluka and Kinwat taluka.

== Members of the Legislative Assembly ==
Year	Member	Party
1952	Shrihari	Indian National Congress
1957	Uttamrao Rathod	Indian National Congress
1962	Uttamrao Rathod	Indian National Congress
1967	Uttamrao Rathod	Indian National Congress
1972	Kishanrao Pachute	Indian National Congress
1978	Uttamrao Rathod	Indian National Congress
1980	Kishanrao Pachute	Indian National Congress (I)
1985	Kishanrao Pachute	Indian National Congress
1990	Subhash Jadhav	Communist Party of India
1993^	Digambar Bapuji Pawar Patil	Bharatiya Janata Party
1995	Digambar Bapuji Pawar Patil	Bharatiya Janata Party
1999	Digambar Bapuji Pawar Patil	Bharatiya Janata Party
2004	Pradeep Hemsingh Jadhav (Naik)	Nationalist Congress Party
2009	Pradeep Hemsingh Jadhav (Naik)	Nationalist Congress Party
2014	Pradeep Hemsingh Jadhav (Naik)	Nationalist Congress Party
2019	Bhimrao Keram	Bharatiya Janata Party
2024	Bhimrao Keram	Bharatiya Janata Party

== Election results ==
=== Assembly Election 2024 ===
2024 Maharashtra Legislative Assembly election : Kinwat
Party	Candidate	Votes	%	±%
BJP	Bhimrao Ramji Keram	92,856	46.18%	▼2.66
NCP-SP	Pradeep Hemsingh Jadhav (Naik)	87,220	43.37%	New
Independent	Sachin Madhavrao Jadhav (Naik)	5,511	2.74%	New
Republican Paksha (Khoripa)	Ashok Sambhajirao Dhole	5,311	2.64%	New
VBA	Dr. Amle Pundalik Gomaji	4,515	2.25%	▼4.16
Independent	Vijay Kashinath Khupse	1,686	0.84%	New
NOTA	None of the above	1,266	0.63%	▲0.06
Margin of victory		5,636	2.80%	▼4.43
Turnout		202,360	72.58%	▲1.45
Total valid votes		201,094		
Registered electors		278,803		▲7.41
BJP hold		Swing	▼2.66	

=== Assembly Election 2019 ===
2019 Maharashtra Legislative Assembly election : Kinwat
Party	Candidate	Votes	%	±%
BJP	Bhimrao Ramji Keram	89,628	48.84%	▲38.03
NCP	Pradeep Hemsingh Jadhav (Naik)	76,356	41.61%	▲6.85
VBA	Prof. Dr. Hamraj Uike	11,764	6.41%	New
NOTA	None of the above	1,041	0.57%	▼0.03
Margin of victory		13,272	7.23%	▲4.35
Turnout		184,630	71.13%	▼0.10
Total valid votes		183,515		
Registered electors		259,579		▲6.19
BJP gain from NCP		Swing	▲14.08	

=== Assembly Election 2014 ===
2014 Maharashtra Legislative Assembly election : Kinwat
Party	Candidate	Votes	%	±%
NCP	Pradeep Hemsingh Jadhav (Naik)	60,127	34.76%	▼12.79
Independent	Bhimrao Ramji Keram	55,152	31.88%	New
BJP	Ashok Shamrao Suryavanshi	18,695	10.81%	▼24.34
SS	Dr. B. D. Chavan	18,227	10.54%	New
CPI(M)	Arjun Kishan Ade	4,158	2.40%	▼6.20
Independent	Karale Sandip Baburao	3,073	1.78%	New
Independent	Mohan Fattusingh Rathod	2,788	1.61%	New
BSP	Thamke Kishanrao Govindrao	2,250	1.30%	▼0.68
NOTA	None of the above	1,030	0.60%	New
Margin of victory		4,975	2.88%	▼9.52
Turnout		174,128	71.23%	▼0.28
Total valid votes		172,977		
Registered electors		244,447		▲19.31
NCP hold		Swing	▼12.79	

=== Assembly Election 2009 ===
2009 Maharashtra Legislative Assembly election : Kinwat
Party	Candidate	Votes	%	±%
NCP	Pradeep Hemsingh Jadhav (Naik)	69,645	47.55%	▲1.91
BJP	Bhimrao Ramji Keram	51,483	35.15%	▲21.11
CPI(M)	Arjun Kishan Ade	12,600	8.60%	▲5.37
JSS	Dharamsing Dagdu Rathod	3,702	2.53%	New
BSP	Rangenwar Suresh Ramrao	2,902	1.98%	New
MNS	Ashok Mukundrao Nemmaniwar	2,145	1.46%	New
Independent	Shriniwas Ramvallabhaji Joshi	1,470	1.00%	New
BBM	Jadhav Akash Subhash	1,053	0.72%	▼3.97
Margin of victory		18,162	12.40%	▼7.76
Turnout		146,521	71.51%	▼4.91
Total valid votes		146,455		
Registered electors		204,891		▲10.67
NCP hold		Swing	▲1.91	

=== Assembly Election 2004 ===
2004 Maharashtra Legislative Assembly election : Kinwat
Party	Candidate	Votes	%	±%
NCP	Pradeep Hemsingh Jadhav (Naik)	64,558	45.64%	▲24.91
Independent	Bhimrao Ramaji Keram	36,042	25.48%	New
BJP	Dagadu Rathod	19,865	14.04%	▼10.74
BBM	Shrimanwar Narayan Shankar	6,639	4.69%	New
CPI(M)	Ade Arjun Kishan	4,575	3.23%	▼0.66
CPI	Isakhan Khan Sardar	3,919	2.77%	▲1.63
Independent	Sidam Narayan Rao Rajaram	2,804	1.98%	New
Independent	Ku. Ashatai Uddhavrao Kadam	1,349	0.95%	New
Margin of victory		28,516	20.16%	▲16.11
Turnout		141,475	76.42%	▲1.89
Total valid votes		141,465		
Registered electors		185,138		▲21.61
NCP gain from BJP		Swing	▲20.86	

=== Assembly Election 1999 ===
1999 Maharashtra Legislative Assembly election : Kinwat
Party	Candidate	Votes	%	±%
BJP	Digambar Bapuji Pawar Patil	25,731	24.78%	▼3.19
NCP	Pradeep Hemsingh Jadhav (Naik)	21,522	20.73%	New
Independent	Bhimrao Ramji Keram	20,120	19.38%	New
Independent	Chavan Arvind Ganeshlal	15,316	14.75%	New
INC	Keshave Namdevrao Gyanbaji	12,146	11.70%	▼0.46
CPI(M)	Ade Arjun Kishanrao	4,037	3.89%	New
Independent	Kadam Ashatai Uddhavrao	3,169	3.05%	New
CPI	Jadhav Anitbai Subhash	1,187	1.14%	New
Margin of victory		4,209	4.05%	▼5.59
Turnout		113,468	74.53%	▼6.59
Total valid votes		103,820		
Registered electors		152,237		▲2.12
BJP hold		Swing	▼3.19	

=== Assembly Election 1995 ===
1995 Maharashtra Legislative Assembly election : Kinwat
Party	Candidate	Votes	%	±%
BJP	Digambar Bapuji Pawar Patil	33,110	27.97%	New
Independent	Bhimrao Ramji Keram	21,702	18.33%	New
Independent	Rathod Praful Prakash	17,030	14.39%	New
Independent	Ade Arjun Kishan	15,437	13.04%	New
INC	Pachpute Kishanrao Champatrao	14,395	12.16%	▼19.57
BBM	Jadhav Thakur Narayan	7,163	6.05%	New
Independent	Jadhav Vithal Nanu	2,543	2.15%	New
PWPI	Jadhav Yadeorao Rupla	1,222	1.03%	New
Margin of victory		11,408	9.64%	▼10.79
Turnout		120,923	81.12%	▲15.06
Total valid votes		118,365		
Registered electors		149,071		▲8.48
BJP gain from CPI		Swing	▼24.18	

=== Assembly Election 1990 ===
1990 Maharashtra Legislative Assembly election : Kinwat
Party	Candidate	Votes	%	±%
CPI	Jadhv Subhash Limbaji	46,449	52.15%	▲28.51
INC	Kishanrao Champatrao Pachpute	28,258	31.73%	▲1.33
SS	Varun Vijaysing Rathod	10,202	11.46%	New
INS(SCS)	Vithalrao Shamrao Naik	842	0.95%	New
Independent	Madhukar Ganpatrao Wattamwar	824	0.93%	New
Margin of victory		18,191	20.43%	▲18.35
Turnout		90,786	66.06%	▲8.20
Total valid votes		89,060		
Registered electors		137,421		▲27.16
CPI gain from INC		Swing	▲21.75	

=== Assembly Election 1985 ===
1985 Maharashtra Legislative Assembly election : Kinwat
Party	Candidate	Votes	%	±%
INC	Pachpute Kishanrao Ghampatrao	18,613	30.40%	New
IC(S)	Rathod Indrasingh Bhasu	17,338	28.32%	New
CPI	Jadhav Sibhash Limbaji	14,473	23.64%	▼10.98
Independent	Sidam Narayanrao Rajaram	4,914	8.03%	New
Independent	Sukhdev Ganapat Muneshwar	3,334	5.45%	New
Independent	Jadhav Yadavrao Rupla Naik	1,573	2.57%	New
Independent	Bhagat Ravasaheb Hasanrao	972	1.59%	New
Margin of victory		1,275	2.08%	▼3.81
Turnout		62,531	57.86%	▲1.18
Total valid votes		61,217		
Registered electors		108,071		▲6.55
INC gain from INC(I)		Swing	▼10.11	

=== Assembly Election 1980 ===
1980 Maharashtra Legislative Assembly election : Kinwat
Party	Candidate	Votes	%	±%
INC(I)	Pachpute Kishanrao Champatrao	22,732	40.51%	▲9.48
CPI	Jadhav Subhash Limbaji	19,426	34.62%	New
Independent	Tirmanwar Govindrao Lachanna	9,750	17.38%	New
Independent	Donkalwar Ram Reddy Ramk Ishtu	1,520	2.71%	New
INC(U)	Hamjakhan Mohinuddin Khan	1,388	2.47%	New
Independent	Pendor Kishanrao Banduji	1,298	2.31%	New
Margin of victory		3,306	5.89%	▼4.30
Turnout		57,496	56.68%	▼19.17
Total valid votes		56,114		
Registered electors		101,431		▲9.29
INC(I) gain from INC		Swing	▼0.71	

=== Assembly Election 1978 ===
1978 Maharashtra Legislative Assembly election : Kinwat
Party	Candidate	Votes	%	±%
INC	Uttamrao Baliram Rathod	27,765	41.22%	▼5.18
INC(I)	Pachute Kishanrao Champatrao	20,902	31.03%	New
JP	Kottwar Janardhanrao Dattatrayrao	7,644	11.35%	New
PWPI	Keshave Namdeorao Gyanbaji	5,679	8.43%	▼2.21
Independent	Raibole Sadasdiv Satwaji	3,530	5.24%	New
Independent	Syed Osmanali Kashamali	1,836	2.73%	New
Margin of victory		6,863	10.19%	▼8.90
Turnout		70,395	75.85%	▲5.46
Total valid votes		67,356		
Registered electors		92,812		▼8.66
INC hold		Swing	▼5.18	

=== Assembly Election 1972 ===
1972 Maharashtra Legislative Assembly election : Kinwat
Party	Candidate	Votes	%	±%
INC	Pachpute Kishanrao Champatrao	31,563	46.40%	▼2.91
Independent	Mudholkar R. Mukukda	18,580	27.31%	New
PWPI	Sinde Vithalrao Raghojee	7,239	10.64%	▼25.95
RPI	Patitl Laxaman Kisan	4,117	6.05%	New
RPI(K)	Gulabrao Bhikaji Bihade	3,568	5.25%	New
Independent	Kotnak Bhimrao Sonba	1,885	2.77%	New
ABJS	Rathon Parasram Ramu	1,070	1.57%	▼3.94
Margin of victory		12,983	19.09%	▲6.37
Turnout		71,523	70.39%	▲1.36
Total valid votes		68,022		
Registered electors		101,612		▲12.23
INC hold		Swing	▼2.91	

=== Assembly Election 1967 ===
1967 Maharashtra Legislative Assembly election : Kinwat
Party	Candidate	Votes	%	±%
INC	Uttamrao Baliram Rathod	27,788	49.31%	▼16.86
PWPI	V. R. Shinde	20,618	36.59%	▲2.76
Independent	L. Kishanrao	4,842	8.59%	New
ABJS	P. R. Rathod	3,106	5.51%	New
Margin of victory		7,170	12.72%	▼19.61
Turnout		62,503	69.03%	▲4.91
Total valid votes		56,354		
Registered electors		90,542		▲17.20
INC hold		Swing	▼16.86	

=== Assembly Election 1962 ===
1962 Maharashtra Legislative Assembly election : Kinwat
Party	Candidate	Votes	%	±%
INC	Uttamrao Baliram Rathod	30,368	66.17%	▲11.78
PWPI	Vithalrao Raghoji	15,529	33.83%	▼11.78
Margin of victory		14,839	32.33%	▲23.55
Turnout		49,537	64.12%	▲12.02
Total valid votes		45,897		
Registered electors		77,256		▲19.61
INC hold		Swing	▲11.78	

=== Assembly Election 1957 ===
1957 Bombay State Legislative Assembly election : Kinwat
Party	Candidate	Votes	%	±%
INC	Uttamrao Baliram Rathod	18,301	54.39%	▼5.20
PWPI	Vithal Raghoo	15,348	45.61%	New
Margin of victory		2,953	8.78%	▼22.04
Turnout		33,649	52.10%	▲8.19
Total valid votes		33,649		
Registered electors		64,589		▲39.93
INC hold		Swing	▼5.20	

=== Assembly Election 1952 ===
1952 Hyderabad State Legislative Assembly election : Kinwat
Party	Candidate	Votes	%	±%
INC	Shrihari	12,077	59.59%	New
PDF	Laxman Rao	5,831	28.77%	New
Independent	Venkat Rao	2,359	11.64%	New
Margin of victory		6,246	30.82%	
Turnout		20,267	43.91%	
Total valid votes		20,267		
Registered electors		46,157		
INC win (new seat)				
