= Nanded Assembly constituency =

Nanded
- Former constituency for the Maharashtra Legislative Assembly

Constituency details
- Country: India
- Region: Western India
- State: Maharashtra
- Division: Aurangabad
- District: Nanded
- Lok Sabha constituency: Nanded
- Established: 1951
- Abolished: 2008

Nanded Assembly constituency was one of the 288 Legislative Assembly constituencies of Maharashtra state, western India. This constituency was located in Nanded district.

== History ==
It was part of Nanded Lok Sabha constituency. It existed from 1952 to 2008.

As per the Delimitation Order, 1951 it consisted of Nanded taluk excluding Neemgaon and Ardhapur Ciroles. In the Delimitation Order, 1956 and Delimitation Order, 1961 it consisted of Nanded taluk (excluding Mudkhed circle). In the Delimitation Order, 1976 it consisted of Nanded municipality and Nanded and Limbgaon RICs in Nanded tahsil. It was abolished by the 2008 Delimitation.

== Members of the Legislative Assembly ==
Election	Member	Party
1952	Raghwan Rao	Indian National Congress
1957	Vithalrao Devidasrao Deshpande	Communist Party of India
1962	Farook Pasha Makhdum Pasha	Indian National Congress
1967	Farook Pasha Makhdum Pasha	Indian National Congress
1972	Farook Pasha Makhdum Pasha	Indian National Congress
1978	Noorallah Khan Bismillah Khan	Janata Party
1980	Kamalkishor Kadam	Indian National Congress
1985	Kamalkishor Kadam	Indian Congress
1990	D. R. Deshmukh	Shiv Sena
1995	Khedkar Prakash Murlidharrao	Shiv Sena
1999	Khedkar Prakash Murlidharrao	Shiv Sena
2004	Anusayatai Prakash Khedkar	Shiv Sena

== Election results ==
=== Assembly Election 2004 ===
2004 Maharashtra Legislative Assembly election : Nanded
Party	Candidate	Votes	%	±%
SS	Anusayatai Prakash Khedkar	84,610	38.99%	▲3.63
INC	Omprakash Ganeshlal Pokrna	63,835	29.42%	New
BSP	Pandhre Sudhakar Ramrao	31,290	14.42%	New
BBM	Gaffar Khan Gulam Mohammed Khan	29,016	13.37%	▼4.54
Independent	Suresh Eknathrao Deshmukh	1,896	0.87%	New
Margin of victory		20,775	9.57%	▼1.24
Turnout		217,009	55.57%	▼6.51
Total valid votes		217,009		
Registered electors		390,493		▲35.21
SS hold		Swing	▲3.63	

=== Assembly Election 1999 ===
1999 Maharashtra Legislative Assembly election : Nanded
Party	Candidate	Votes	%	±%
SS	Khedkar Prakash Murlidharrao	60,474	35.36%	▲5.97
Independent	Abdul Samad A. Karim	41,980	24.55%	New
BBM	Suresh Dnyanoba Gaikwad	30,637	17.91%	New
Independent	Bhagwanrao Madhavrao Patil Alegaonkar	19,404	11.35%	New
NCP	Mohanrao Patil Taklikar	13,112	7.67%	New
Independent	Sawant Prafull Narharrao	1,888	1.10%	New
Independent	Yadav Manohar Sahebrao	1,828	1.07%	New
AIMIM	Altaf Ahmed Iqbal Ahmed	1,039	0.61%	New
Margin of victory		18,494	10.81%	▲1.21
Turnout		179,293	62.08%	▼6.76
Total valid votes		171,025		
Registered electors		288,795		▲2.57
SS hold		Swing	▲5.97	

=== Assembly Election 1995 ===
1995 Maharashtra Legislative Assembly election : Nanded
Party	Candidate	Votes	%	±%
SS	Khedkar Prakash Murlidharrao	55,972	29.39%	▼5.74
JD	Hamid Hussain Sarwari Altaf Hussain	37,680	19.79%	▲11.20
BBM	Gaikwad Suresh Gyanoba	31,345	16.46%	New
INC	Omprakash Ganeshlal Pokrna	28,451	14.94%	▼9.08
Independent	Kamalkishor Kadam	14,254	7.48%	New
Independent	Kadam Uttamrao Kondji	4,813	2.53%	New
Independent	Kamthekar Ranjeetsingh Khandasingh	4,430	2.33%	New
Independent	D. R. Deshmukh	2,357	1.24%	New
Margin of victory		18,292	9.60%	▼1.50
Turnout		193,812	68.84%	▲7.29
Total valid votes		190,444		
Registered electors		281,554		▲23.59
SS hold		Swing	▼5.74	

=== Assembly Election 1990 ===
1990 Maharashtra Legislative Assembly election : Nanded
Party	Candidate	Votes	%	±%
SS	D. R. Deshmukh	48,645	35.13%	New
INC	Kamalkishor Kadam	33,270	24.02%	▼6.26
BRP	Gaikwad Suresh Gyanoba	25,205	18.20%	New
AIML	Mahmd Usman Mahmad Ismail	12,832	9.27%	New
JD	Bhalerao Savita	11,894	8.59%	New
AIMIM	M. Abdul Haleem Ali Sattar M. A. Hakeem	1,013	0.73%	New
Margin of victory		15,375	11.10%	▲7.71
Turnout		140,223	61.55%	▲4.24
Total valid votes		138,489		
Registered electors		227,806		▲42.17
SS gain from IC(S)		Swing	▲1.45	

=== Assembly Election 1985 ===
1985 Maharashtra Legislative Assembly election : Nanded
Party	Candidate	Votes	%	±%
IC(S)	Kamalkishor Kadam	30,462	33.68%	New
INC	Kabra Ramnarayan Ramdev	27,392	30.28%	New
Independent	Isakhan Sardsrkhan	15,249	16.86%	New
Independent	L. D. Bhosale	10,026	11.08%	New
Independent	M. Maqbool Salim Mohammed Khaja	3,929	4.34%	New
CPI	Anantrao Shankarrao Nagapurkar	1,256	1.39%	New
Independent	Gaikwad Naryan Nagorao	949	1.05%	New
Independent	Nazimoddin Siddiq Ahmed	611	0.68%	New
Margin of victory		3,070	3.39%	▼5.47
Turnout		91,832	57.31%	▲2.49
Total valid votes		90,458		
Registered electors		160,236		▲14.80
IC(S) gain from INC(U)		Swing	▼3.30	

=== Assembly Election 1980 ===
1980 Maharashtra Legislative Assembly election : Nanded
Party	Candidate	Votes	%	±%
INC(U)	Kamalkishor Kadam	27,657	36.98%	New
AIML	M. Maqbool Salim Mohammed Khaja	21,030	28.12%	▲0.88
INC(I)	A. Karim Siddiqui A. Rahman	13,443	17.98%	▲14.75
JP	Sadashiv Patil	8,786	11.75%	New
RPI(K)	Magre Kamlakar Ranba	3,294	4.40%	New
Margin of victory		6,627	8.86%	▲0.89
Turnout		76,516	54.82%	▼6.42
Total valid votes		74,781		
Registered electors		139,582		▲13.22
INC(U) gain from JP		Swing	▲1.77	

=== Assembly Election 1978 ===
1978 Maharashtra Legislative Assembly election : Nanded
Party	Candidate	Votes	%	±%
JP	Noorallah Khan Bismillah Khan	25,823	35.21%	New
AIML	M. Maqbool Salim Mohammed Khaja	19,981	27.24%	New
Independent	Tirodekar Vyankatrao Babarao	9,618	13.11%	New
Independent	Satwa Mukunda Pradhan	9,431	12.86%	New
INC(I)	Shinde Bajirao Nivrutirao	2,366	3.23%	New
Independent	Kale Bhimrao Ganpatrao	2,158	2.94%	New
Independent	Kamble Tulsiram Ranba	1,366	1.86%	New
Independent	Kadam Krishan Gopinath	1,091	1.49%	New
Margin of victory		5,842	7.97%	▼17.73
Turnout		75,508	61.24%	▲11.17
Total valid votes		73,345		
Registered electors		123,289		▲6.53
JP gain from INC		Swing	▼9.48	

=== Assembly Election 1972 ===
1972 Maharashtra Legislative Assembly election : Nanded
Party	Candidate	Votes	%	±%
INC	Farook Pasha Makhdum Pasha	25,040	44.69%	▼7.67
Independent	More Eknath Kisanrao	10,642	18.99%	New
CPI	N. A. Shankerrao	5,603	10.00%	▼25.74
RPI(K)	M. K. Dhondiba	3,966	7.08%	New
ABJS	M. C. Govind Rao	3,815	6.81%	▲0.80
Independent	Ayyubkhan Ilyas Khan	3,547	6.33%	New
RPI	Godbole Mohanrao Deorao	2,499	4.46%	New
Independent	Jadhav Hiraji Umaji	920	1.64%	New
Margin of victory		14,398	25.70%	▲9.08
Turnout		57,944	50.07%	▼1.70
Total valid votes		56,032		
Registered electors		115,735		▲23.09
INC hold		Swing	▼7.67	

=== Assembly Election 1967 ===
1967 Maharashtra Legislative Assembly election : Nanded
Party	Candidate	Votes	%	±%
INC	Farook Pasha Makhdum Pasha	24,063	52.36%	▼5.37
CPI	Vithalrao Devidasrao Deshpande	16,426	35.74%	▲5.29
ABJS	C. G. Amki	2,762	6.01%	New
Independent	G. Waghmare	1,735	3.78%	New
Independent	J. C. Potphode	969	2.11%	New
Margin of victory		7,637	16.62%	▼10.66
Turnout		48,681	51.77%	▼6.29
Total valid votes		45,955		
Registered electors		94,026		▲24.65
INC hold		Swing	▼5.37	

=== Assembly Election 1962 ===
1962 Maharashtra Legislative Assembly election : Nanded
Party	Candidate	Votes	%	±%
INC	Farook Pasha Makhdum Pasha	23,929	57.73%	▲14.96
CPI	Vithalrao Devidasrao Deshpande	12,620	30.45%	▼16.16
Independent	Laxman Lingoji	3,058	7.38%	New
ABJS	Laxman Rao Tulshiram	1,844	4.45%	New
Margin of victory		11,309	27.28%	▲23.44
Turnout		43,794	58.06%	▲19.54
Total valid votes		41,451		
Registered electors		75,430		▲12.49
INC gain from CPI		Swing	▲11.12	

=== Assembly Election 1957 ===
1957 Bombay State Legislative Assembly election : Nanded
Party	Candidate	Votes	%	±%
CPI	Vithalrao Devidasrao Deshpande	12,039	46.61%	New
INC	Wilayatali Khan S/o Alrahyarkhan	11,046	42.77%	▼11.77
ABJS	Srinivasji Rajaram Shastri	1,597	6.18%	New
Independent	Waghmare Ganpatrao Manikrao	1,146	4.44%	New
Margin of victory		993	3.84%	▼19.02
Turnout		25,828	38.52%	▲7.71
Total valid votes		25,828		
Registered electors		67,054		▲16.61
CPI gain from INC		Swing	▼7.93	

=== Assembly Election 1952 ===
1952 Hyderabad State Legislative Assembly election : Nanded
Party	Candidate	Votes	%	±%
INC	Raghwan Rao	9,663	54.54%	New
PDF	Vithalrao Devidasrao Deshpande	5,613	31.68%	New
Independent	Venkat Rao	1,163	6.56%	New
Socialist	Mohd. Wilayat Ali	705	3.98%	New
SCF	Govind Rao	574	3.24%	New
Margin of victory		4,050	22.86%	
Turnout		17,718	30.81%	
Total valid votes		17,718		
Registered electors		57,504		
INC win (new seat)				

== See also ==
- List of constituencies of the Maharashtra Legislative Assembly
