= Nanded Lok Sabha constituency =

Constituency of the Indian parliament in Maharashtra

Coordinates: 19.1°N 77.3°E

Nanded Lok Sabha
- Lok Sabha constituency
- Nanded Lok Sabha Constituency map

Constituency details
- Country: India
- Region: Western India
- State: Maharashtra
- Assembly constituencies: Bhokar; Nanded North; Nanded South; Naigaon; Deglur; Mukhed
- Established: 1952
- Reservation: None

Member of Parliament
- 18th Lok Sabha
- Incumbent Ravindra Vasantrao Chavan
- Party: Indian National Congress
- Elected year: 2024
- Preceded by: Vasantrao Balwantrao Chavan

Nanded Lok Sabha constituency is one of the 48 Lok Sabha (parliamentary) constituencies in Maharashtra state in western India.

== Assembly segments ==
Presently, after the implementation of the delimitation of parliamentary constituencies in 2008, Nanded Lok Sabha constituency comprises six Vidhan Sabha (legislative assembly) segments. These segments are:

No	Name	District	Member	Party	Leading (in 2024)
85	Bhokar	Nanded	Sreejaya Chavan	BJP	BJP
86	Nanded North	Nanded	Balaji Kalyankar	SHS	INC
87	Nanded South	Nanded	Anand Tidke	SHS	INC
89	Naigaon	Nanded	Rajesh Pawar	BJP	BJP
90	Deglur (SC)	Nanded	Jitesh Antapurkar	BJP	BJP
91	Mukhed	Nanded	Tushar Rathod	BJP	BJP

== Members of Parliament ==
Year	Name	Party
1952	Shankarrao Telkikar	Indian National Congress
1952	Deorao Kamble	Indian National Congress
1957	Deorao Kamble	Indian National Congress
1957	Harihar Rao Sonule	Scheduled Castes Federation
1962	Tulsidas Jadhav	Indian National Congress
1967	Venkatarao Tarodekar	Indian National Congress
1971	Venkatarao Tarodekar	Indian National Congress
1977	Keshavrao Dhondage	Janata Party
1980	Shankarrao Chavan	Indian National Congress
1984	Shankarrao Chavan	Indian National Congress
1987^	Ashok Chavan	Indian National Congress
1989	Venkatesh Kabde	Janata Dal
1991	Suryakanta Patil	Indian National Congress
1996	Gangadharrao Deshmukh Kunturkar	Indian National Congress
1998	Bhaskarrao Khatgaonkar Patil	Indian National Congress
1999	Bhaskarrao Khatgaonkar Patil	Indian National Congress
2004	Digambar Pawar Patil	Bharatiya Janata Party
2009	Bhaskarrao Khatgaonkar Patil	Indian National Congress
2014	Ashok Chavan	Indian National Congress
2019	Prataprao Chikhalikar Patil	Bharatiya Janata Party
2024	Vasantrao Chavan	Indian National Congress
2024^	Ravindra Chavan	Indian National Congress

^ by-poll

== Election results ==
=== 2024 by-election ===
2024 Nanded by-election
Party	Candidate	Votes	%	±%
INC	Ravindra Vasantrao Chavan	586,788	44.81	▼2.07
BJP	Dr. Santukrao Marotrao Hambarde	5,85,331	44.69	▲3.08
VBA	Avinash Vishwanath Bhosikar	80,179	6.12	▼2.08
NOTA	None of the above	2,911	0.22	▼0.10
Majority		1,457	0.12	▼5.15
Turnout		13,09,620	67.81	▲6.88
INC hold		Swing	▼2.07	

=== 2024 ===
2024 Indian general elections: Nanded
Party	Candidate	Votes	%	±%
INC	Vasantrao Balwantrao Chavan	528,894	46.88	▲7.33
BJP	Prataprao Govindrao Chikhalikar	4,69,452	41.61	▼1.49
VBA	Avinash Vishwanath Bhosikar	92,512	8.20	▼6.52
BSP	Pandurang Rama Adgulwar	6,901	0.61	N/A
Independent	Nikhil Laxmanrao Garje	4,325	0.38	N/A
NOTA	None of the Above	3628	0.32	▼0.22
Majority		59,442	5.27	▲1.72
Turnout		11,28,254	60.93	▼4.76
INC gain from BJP		Swing		

=== 2019 ===
2019 Indian general elections: Nanded
Party	Candidate	Votes	%	±%
BJP	Prataprao Govindrao Chikhalikar	486,806	43.10	+2.51
INC	Ashok Chavan	4,46,658	39.55	−9.07
VBA	Prof. Yashpal Bhinge	1,66,196	14.72	
NOTA	None of the Above	6,114	0.54	
Majority		40,138	3.55	
Turnout		11,29,462	65.69	
BJP gain from INC		Swing		

=== General elections 2014 ===
2014 Indian general elections: Nanded
Party	Candidate	Votes	%	±%
INC	Ashok Shankarrao Chavan	493,075	48.62	+3.90
BJP	Digambar Bapuji Pawar Patil	4,11,620	40.59	+4.69
BMP	Rajratna Ambedkar	28,447	2.80	
BSP	Hansraj Vaidya	22,809	2.24	−8.70
Majority		81,455	8.03	
Turnout		10,14,020	60.11	
INC hold		Swing		

=== General elections 2009 ===
2009 Indian general elections: Nanded
Party	Candidate	Votes	%	±%
INC	Bhaskarrao Bapurao Khatgaonkar Patil	346,400	44.72	
BJP	Sambhaji Pawar	2,71,786	35.09	
BSP	Mohammad Makbul Salim	84,743	10.94	
Majority		74,614	9.63	
Turnout		7,74,590	53.83	
INC gain from BJP		Swing		

== See also ==
- Nanded district
- List of constituencies of the Lok Sabha
