= Harihar Rao Sonule =

Indian politician (born 1927)

Hariharrao Sonule

Member of Parliament, Lok Sabha
- In office 1957–1962
- Preceded by: Shankar Rao Telkikar
- Succeeded by: Venkatarao Tarodekar
- Constituency: Nanded

Personal details
- Born: 11 June 1927
- Party: Scheduled Castes Federation
- Spouse: Anjana
- Children: One daughter

Hariharrao Sonule (born 11 June 1927) was an Indian politician. He was elected to the Lok Sabha, the lower house of the Parliament of India as a member of the Scheduled Castes Federation.
