= Pradeep Hemsingh Jadhav =

Indian politician (1954–2025)

Pradeep Jadhav (Naik)

Member of Maharashtra Legislative Assembly
- In office (2004-2009), (2009-2014), (2014 – 2019)
- Preceded by: Digambar Bapuji Pawar Patil
- Succeeded by: Bhimrao Keram
- Constituency: Kinwat

Personal details
- Born: 12 November 1954 Daheli Tanda, Kinwat Taluka, Nanded District, Hyderabad State, India
- Died: 1 January 2025 (aged 70) Hyderabad, Telangana, India
- Party: Nationalist Congress Party – Sharadchandra Pawar
- Other political affiliations: Nationalist Congress Party

Pradeep Hemsingh Jadhav (Naik) (11 November 1954 – 1 January 2025) was an Indian politician who was a member of the 13th Maharashtra Legislative Assembly. He represented the Kinwat Assembly Constituency and he was also a great leader of the Banjara community. He belonged to the Nationalist Congress Party (NCP). Jadhav was also a cotton trader based in the Adilabad district.

== Life and career ==
Pradeep Hemsingh Jadhav belonged to the Nationalist Congress Party. Jadhav was also popularly known as BHAYA (meaning "a brother"). He had received offers from the constituent parties of the grand alliance, NDA (Mahayuti), but remained loyal to the Nationalist Congress Party for 25 years and was a confidant of Sharad Pawar.

Pradip Hemsingh Jadhav died on 1 January 2025, at the age of 70.
