= Murder of Vikram Joshi =

2020 crime in Uttar Pradesh, India

Vikram Joshi (Hindi: विक्रम जोशी) was an Indian journalist who was shot on 20 July 2020, by two unidentified assailants in front of his minor daughters in Ghaziabad, Uttar Pradesh. He succumbed to his injuries 2 days later in the hospital. The incident caused widespread criticism of the Uttar Pradesh government among opposition parties as well as the media.

== The incident ==
Joshi had filed a police complaint on 16 July 2020 against some people who were accused of harassing his niece. On 20 July 2020, while he was on his motorcycle with his daughters, aged 5 and 11, the assailants forcibly stopped his motorcycle and started beating him. Then, one of the suspects shot at his head from close range and the assailants fled the scene. The entire incident was caught in CCTV footage and created outrage across the country. Joshi succumbed to his injuries on 22 July 2020. Nine men were been arrested in connection with the incident, and one policeman was suspended.

Uttar Pradesh Chief Minister Yogi Adityanath announced 10 lakh [[[ex gratia]] for Vikram Joshi's family.

== Reactions ==
Former Chief Ministers, Akhilesh Yadav and Mayawati questioned the poor state of law and order in Uttar Pradesh. Congress leader Priyanka Gandhi raised questions about the safety of common people in "Jungle Raj". West Bengal Chief Minister Mamata Banerjee took to social media to express her shock on media's voice being muzzled.

Press Association and Indian Women's Press Corps condemned the killing and demanded probe into the incident as well as other similar incidents of attacks on journalists.
