= Political divisions of Wayanad =

Coordinates: 11.634°N 75.992°E

Map of Wayanad District

Wayanad District has four types of administrative hierarchies:

- Taluk and Village administration managed by the provincial government of Kerala
- Panchayath Administration managed by the local bodies
- Parliament Constituencies for the federal government of India
- Assembly Constituencies for the provincial government of Kerala

== Administration of Wayanad ==
District Headquarters: Kalpetta. District Collector, District Police Chief and District Judge are based at Kalpetta.

== Taluks of Wayanad ==
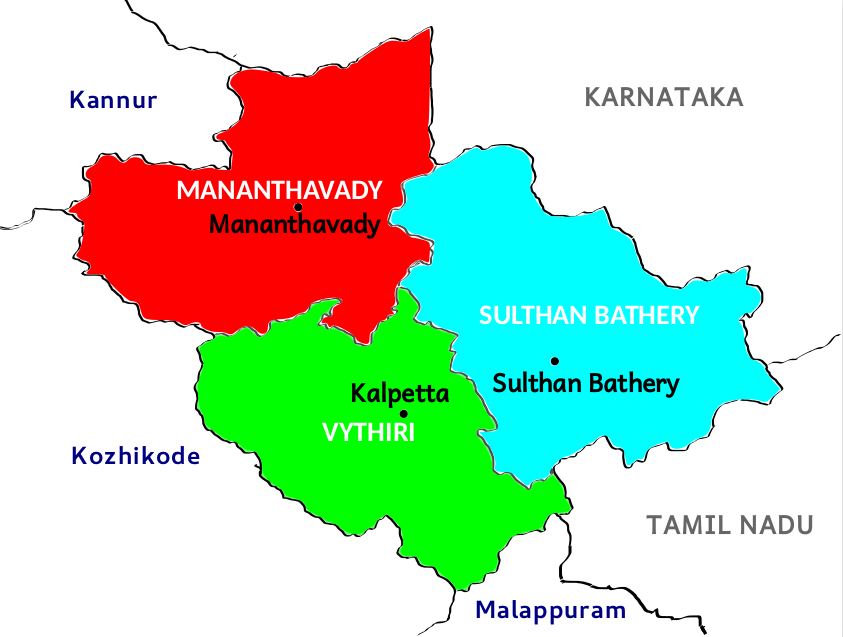
Taluks in Wayanad district

No. of Taluks: 3

- Vythiri(Headquarters: Kalpetta)
- Sulthan Bathery
- Mananthavady

== Assembly Seats ==
No. of state Assembly Legislators: 3

- Kalpetta - Current MLA is Mr. T Siddique
- Sulthan Bathery - Current MLA is Mr. I.C. Balakrishnan
- Mananthavady - Current MLA is Mr.O.R.Kelu

== Wayanad Parliament Constituency ==
Wayanad Lok Sabha constituency is one of twenty Lok Sabha (lower house of the Parliament of India) constituencies in Kerala state in southern India. Wayanad is a newly created constituency consisting of seven assembly constituency segments.

== Assembly segments ==
Wayanad Lok Sabha constituency is composed of the following assembly segments:

- Mananthavadi
- Kalpetta
- Sulthan Bathery
- Thiruvambady
- Nilambur
- Wandoor
- Eranad

== Members of Parliament ==
- 2009: M. I. Shanavas, Indian National Congress. In the General Elections 2009 to the 15th Lok Sabha, Shri M.I. Shanavas of INC won the Wayanad constituency. He defeated his nearest rival, Advocate M Rahmathulla of CPI by a margin of 153,439 votes. MI Shanavas secure 410,703 votes. M Rahmathulla secures 257,264 votes. K Muraleedharan of NCP secures 99,663 votes. MI Shanavas is a native of Neerettupuram, Alappuzha, and is KPCC general secretary. He entered politics through the Kerala Students Union and worked in the Youth Congress and Seva Dal. He was one of three leaders who rebelled against senior Congress leader K. Karunakaran and formed a third group. (The others were Ramesh Chennithala and G. Karthikeyan.) He contested unsuccessfully to Lok Sabha in 1999 and 2004. He also faced defeat in two assembly elections.Mr Rahul Gandhi and Mrs. Priyanka Gandhi vadra

== Indian general election, 2014 ==
2014 Indian general election : Wayanad
Party	Candidate	Votes	%	±%
AAP	Adv. P P A Sageer	10,684	1.16	
Trinamool Congress	Satheesh Chandran	741		
BSP	Vappan	1317	0.14	
BJP	P R Rasmilnath	80,752	8.83%	+4.98%
CPI	Sathyan Mokeri	356,165	38.92%	+7.69%
CPI(ML) Red Star	Sam P Mathew	1222		
Independent	P V Anwar	37,123	4.06	
INC	M I Shanavas	377,035	41.21%	−8.65%
SDPI	Jaleel Neelambra	14,327	1.56	
WPOI	Ramla Mampad	12,645	1.38	
NOTA	–	10,735	1.17%	–
Margin of victory		20,870	2.28%	−16.35%
Turnout		9,14,015	73.28	
INC hold		Swing		

== See also ==
- Indian general election, 2014 (Kerala)
