= Nanded North Assembly constituency =

Constituency of the Maharashtra legislative assembly in India

Coordinates: 19.178°N 77.319°E

Nanded North
- Constituency No. 86 for the Maharashtra Legislative Assembly

Constituency details
- Country: India
- Region: Western India
- State: Maharashtra
- Division: Aurangabad
- District: Nanded
- Lok Sabha constituency: Nanded Lok Sabha
- Established: 2008
- Total electors: 359,073
- Reservation: None

Member of Legislative Assembly
- 15th Maharashtra Legislative Assembly
- Incumbent Balaji Kalyankar
- Party: SHS
- Alliance: NDA
- Elected year: 2024

Nanded North Assembly constituency is one of the 288 Vidhan Sabha (legislative assembly) constituencies of Maharashtra state in western India. This constituency is located in Nanded district.

== Members of the Legislative Assembly ==
Year	Member	Party
1952	Raghwan Rao	Indian National Congress
1957	Vithalrao Deshpande	Communist Party of India
1962	Farook Pasha Makhdum Pasha	Indian National Congress
1967	Farook Pasha Makhdum Pasha	Indian National Congress
1972	Farook Pasha Makhdum Pasha	Indian National Congress
1978	Noorallah Khan Bismillah Khan	Janata Party
1980	Kamalkishor Kadam	Indian National Congress (U)
1985	Kamalkishor Kadam	Indian Congress (Socialist)
1990	D. R. Deshmukh	Shiv Sena
1995	Prakash Khedkar	Shiv Sena
1999	Prakash Khedkar	Shiv Sena
2004	Anusayatai Khedkar	Shiv Sena
Before 2008 : See Nanded
2009	D. P. Sawant	Indian National Congress
2014	D. P. Sawant	Indian National Congress
2019	Balaji Kalyankar	Shiv Sena
2024	Balaji Kalyankar	Shiv Sena

== Election results ==
=== Assembly Election 2024 ===
2024 Maharashtra Legislative Assembly election : Nanded North
Party	Candidate	Votes	%	±%
SS	Balaji Devidasrao Kalyankar	83,184	37.79%	▲4.44
INC	Abdul Sattar A Gaffoor	79,682	36.20%	▲9.27
VBA	Er. Prashant Viraj Ingole	24,266	11.02%	▼3.07
SS(UBT)	Sangita Vithal Patil	22,706	10.31%	New
Independent	Deshmukh Milind Uttamrao	4,562	2.07%	New
BSP	Vitthal Kishanrao Ghodke	1,367	0.62%	▲0.03
NOTA	None of the Above	596	0.27%	▼0.23
Margin of victory		3,502	1.59%	▼4.83
Turnout		220,741	61.48%	▲1.17
Total valid votes		220,145		
Registered electors		359,073		▲14.53
SS hold		Swing	▲4.44	

=== Assembly Election 2019 ===
2019 Maharashtra Legislative Assembly election : Nanded North
Party	Candidate	Votes	%	±%
SS	Balaji Kalyankar	62,884	33.35%	▲20.31
INC	D. P. Sawant	50,778	26.93%	▲4.15
AIMIM	Muhammad Feroz Khan Lala	41,892	22.22%	▲3.96
VBA	Mukundrao Narharrao Chawre	26,569	14.09%	New
NOTA	None of the Above	940	0.50%	▲0.09
Margin of victory		12,106	6.42%	▲2.13
Turnout		189,823	60.55%	▲6.75
Total valid votes		188,561		
Registered electors		313,523		▼5.49
SS gain from INC		Swing	▲10.57	

=== Assembly Election 2014 ===
2014 Maharashtra Legislative Assembly election : Nanded North
Party	Candidate	Votes	%	±%
INC	D. P. Sawant	40,356	22.78%	▼26.32
BJP	Sudhakar Ramrao Pandhare	32,754	18.49%	New
AIMIM	Abdul Habeeb Abdul Rahim	32,333	18.25%	▲10.49
SS	Milind Uttamrao (Chate) Deshmukh	23,103	13.04%	▼3.78
BSP	Suresh Gyanoba Gaikwad	20,549	11.60%	▲3.56
NCP	Sunil Shamrao Kadam	10,857	6.13%	New
BMP	Rajratna Ambedkar	5,716	3.23%	New
NOTA	None of the Above	727	0.41%	New
Margin of victory		7,602	4.29%	▼27.99
Turnout		178,284	53.75%	▲3.95
Total valid votes		177,129		
Registered electors		331,722		▲20.12
INC hold		Swing	▼26.32	

=== Assembly Election 2009 ===
2009 Maharashtra Legislative Assembly election : Nanded North
Party	Candidate	Votes	%	±%
INC	D. P. Sawant	67,052	49.10%	New
SS	Anusaya Prakash Khedkar	22,970	16.82%	New
Independent	Dr. Shila Sunil Kadam	13,408	9.82%	New
BSP	Engineer Kishanrao Wane	10,981	8.04%	New
AIMIM	Abdul Rauf A.Wahed	10,605	7.77%	New
JSS	Adv.Avinash Vishwanathrao Bhosikar	2,639	1.93%	New
MNS	Pawade Vinod Nilkanthrao	2,121	1.55%	New
Margin of victory		44,082	32.28%	
Turnout		136,632	49.47%	
Total valid votes		136,560		
Registered electors		276,167		
INC win (new seat)				
