= Shyamsundar Dagdoji Shinde =

Indian politician

Shyamsundar Shinde
- श्यामसुंदर शिंदे

Maharashtra Legislative Assembly
- In office 24 October 2019 – 2024
- Preceded by: Prataprao Govindrao Chikhalikar
- Succeeded by: Prataprao Govindrao Chikhalikar
- Constituency: Loha

Personal details
- Born: 13 June 1956 (age 69) Kandhar, Maharashtra
- Party: Peasants and Workers Party of India

Ex-IAS Officer

Shyamsundar D. Shinde is an Indian politician in the Peasants and Workers Party of India. He was elected as a member of the Maharashtra Legislative Assembly from Loha on 24 October 2019.
