= D. P. Sawant =

Indian politician

Member of the Maharashtra Legislative Assembly
- In office (2009-2014), (2014 – 2019)
- Preceded by: Anusayatai Prakash Khedkar
- Succeeded by: Balaji Kalyankar
- Constituency: Nanded North

Dr. Dattatraya Sawant is a member of the 13th Maharashtra Legislative Assembly. He represents the Nanded North Assembly Constituency. He belongs to the Indian National Congress. He has been the Minister of State(MoS) for Higher and Technical education. He is considered to be a trusted associate of former Maharashtra Chief Minister Ashok Chavan. He was Guardian Minister of Nanded District for years 2010-14.

== Controversy ==
He has been the subject of controversy in relation to air travel expenses incurred by him as minister in October 2013 at the time when his government was in the middle of an austerity campaign. In December, 2014, he was amongst 22 ex-ministers who hadn't vacated their official bungalows.

On 22 March 2017, Sawant was suspended along with 18 other MLAs until 31 December for interrupting Maharashtra Finance Minister Sudhir Mungantiwar during a state budget session and burning copies of the budget outside the assembly four days earlier.

== Also read ==
- Marathi Wikipedia of P.K. Sawant
- P. K. Sawant
