= Govind Mukkaji Rathod =

Indian politician

Member of the Maharashtra Legislative Assembly
- In office 19 October 2014 – 26 October 2014
- Preceded by: Hanmant Venketrao Patil, INC
- Succeeded by: Tushar Rathod, BJP

Mukhed Municipal Council

Personal details
- Born: 1952
- Died: 26 October 2014 (aged 61–62)
- Party: Bharatiya Janata Party

Govindrao Rathod (died 26 October 2014) was a member of the 13th Maharashtra Legislative Assembly. He represented the Mukhed Assembly Constituency. He belonged to the Bharatiya Janata Party (BJP). He died soon after being elected & without swearing-in. He was 62 at the time of his death.

== Career ==
Rathod was a long time member of the Indian National Congress. He was twice president of the Mukhed Municipal Council and a member of the Nanded Zilla Parishad. He joined the BJP, before the October, 2014 Assembly elections. In October, 2014 he was elected to the state assembly.

== Death ==
On 28 October 2014, Rathod was travelling to Mumbai by the train Devagiri Express, he complained of chest pain and suffered a heart attack around 10.30 pm, near Jalna, he was taken to a hospital in Jalna, but was declared dead on arrival.
