= Prataprao Patil Chikhalikar =

Indian politician

Member of the Maharashtra Legislative Assembly
- Incumbent
- Assumed office 2024
- Preceded by: Shyamsundar Dagdoji Shinde
- Constituency: Loha
- In office 2014–2019
- Preceded by: Shankarrao (Shankar Anna) Ganeshrao Dhondge
- Succeeded by: Shyamsundar Dagdoji Shinde
- Constituency: Loha
- In office 2004–2009
- Preceded by: Rohidas Khobraji Chavan
- Succeeded by: Constituency Abolished
- Constituency: Kandhar

Member of Parliament in Lok Sabha
- In office 2019–2024
- Preceded by: Ashok Chavan
- Succeeded by: Vasantrao Balwantrao Chavan
- Constituency: Nanded

Personal details
- Born: 2 August 1960 (age 66)
- Party: Nationalist Congress Party (Oct. 2024-Present)
- Other political affiliations: Bharatiya Janata Party (2019-2024) ,NCP, Shiv Sena, Lok Bharati, Congress(I).
- Children: Dr. Pramod, Pravin, Pranita Chikhalikar-Deore,
- Occupation: Politician

Prataprao Govindrao Chikhalikar Patil (born 2 August 1960) is an Indian politician and Bharatiya Janata Party leader from Nanded district. He is a member of the 13th Maharashtra Legislative Assembly. He represents the Loha Assembly Constituency.

== Career ==
Chikhalikar has been described as being close to Shankarrao Chavan but has later become an opponent of his son Ashok Chavan, becoming a close junior associate of former Maharashtra Chief Minister the late Vilasrao Deshmukh. He won assembly elections in 2004. In 2007, Chikhalikar, joined Lok Bharati political outfit during municipality elections there, contesting elections against the Indian National Congress. In 2012 Chikhalikar joined the Nationalist Congress Party and in August 2014, Chikhalikar joined the Shiv Sena. In 2024, Chikhalikar joined the Nationalist Congress Party of Ajit Pawar to get a ticket from Loha Kandhar Assembly Constituency.

== Positions held ==
- 2004: Elected to Maharashtra Legislative Assembly from Kandhar Vidhansabha as Independent
- 2009: Unsuccessfully contested Loha Vidhansabha on Congress ticket
- 2014: Elected to Maharashtra Legislative Assembly from Shivsena Party
- 2015: Elected as Director of Nanded District Central Co-operative Bank
- 2019: MP- Nanded loksabha Constituency
- 2024: Elected to Maharashtra Legislative Assembly from Nationalist Congress Party
