= Shankar Rao Telkikar =

Indian politician

Shankarrao Telkikar

Member of Parliament, Lok Sabha
- In office 1952-1957
- Succeeded by: Harihar Rao Sonule
- Constituency: Nanded

Personal details
- Born: 3 October 1898 Telki, Nanded district, British India
- Died: 2 November 1980 (aged 82)
- Party: Indian National Congress
- Spouse: Kamaladevi Telkikar
- Children: 5 Sons and 2 Daughters

Shankarrao Telkikar was an Indian politician. He was elected to the Lok Sabha, the lower house of the Parliament of India as a member of the Indian National Congress.
