= Digambar Bapuji Pawar Patil =

Indian politician

Digambar Bapuji Patil

Member of Parliament, Lok Sabha
- In office 2004–2009
- Preceded by: Bhaskarrao Khatgaonkar
- Succeeded by: Bhaskarrao Khatgaonkar
- Constituency: Nanded

Member of Maharashtra Legislative Assembly
- In office 1995–2004
- Preceded by: Subhash Jadhav
- Succeeded by: Pradeep Jadhav
- Constituency: Kinwat

Personal details
- Born: 1 February 1952 (age 74) Nanded
- Party: Bharatiya Janata Party
- Spouse: Satvashila Patil
- Parents: Bapuji Patil (father); Geeta Bai Patil (mother)

Digambar Bapuji Pawar Patil (born 1 February 1952) is an Indian politician who was the Member of Parliament in the Lok Sabha of India. He represented Nanded constituency of Maharashtra and is a member of the Bharatiya Janata Party (BJP) political party. He unsuccessfully contested from Nanded in 2014 General elections against Ashok Chavan of Congress.
