= Kandhar Assembly constituency =

Constituency of the Maharashtra legislative assembly in India

Kandhar
- Former constituency for the Maharashtra Legislative Assembly

Constituency details
- Country: India
- Region: Western India
- State: Maharashtra
- Established: 1952
- Abolished: 2008
- Total electors: 213,421

Kandhar Assembly constituency was an assembly constituency in the India state of Maharashtra.

== Members of the Legislative Assembly ==
Election	Member	Party
1952	Govind Rao Narsing Rao	Indian National Congress
1952	Madhaw Rao Sawai	Indian National Congress
1962	Keshavrao Shankarrao Dhondge	Peasants and Workers Party of India
1967	Keshavrao Shankarrao Dhondge	Peasants and Workers Party of India
1972	Keshavrao Shankarrao Dhondge	Peasants and Workers Party of India
1978	Gurunathrao Manikrao Kurude	Peasants and Workers Party of India
1980	Eshwarrao Narayanrao Bhosikar	Indian National Congress (I)
1985	Keshavrao Shankarrao Dhondge	Peasants and Workers Party of India
1990	Keshavrao Shankarrao Dhondge	Peasants and Workers Party of India
1995	Rohidas Khobraji Chavan	Shiv Sena
1999	Rohidas Khobraji Chavan	Shiv Sena
2004	Prataprao Patil Chikhalikar	Independent politician

== Election results ==
=== Assembly Election 2004 ===
2004 Maharashtra Legislative Assembly election : Kandhar
Party	Candidate	Votes	%	±%
Independent	Prataprao Patil Chikhalikar	49,191	30.86%	New
NCP	Shankar Anna Dhondge	43,218	27.11%	New
SS	Chavan Rohidas Khobraji	42,511	26.67%	▼6.45
Independent	Bhosikar Hariharrao Vishvanathrao	12,666	7.94%	New
BSP	Vikram Vithalrao Sorge	2,484	1.56%	New
Independent	Lute Prabhu Sambhaji	2,190	1.37%	New
Independent	Borole Venkatrao Kishanrao	1,793	1.12%	New
ABS	Kendre Santukrao Babarao	1,393	0.87%	New
Margin of victory		5,973	3.75%	▼2.76
Turnout		159,430	74.70%	▲3.41
Total valid votes		159,423		
Registered electors		213,421		▲18.48
Independent gain from SS		Swing	▼2.26	

=== Assembly Election 1999 ===
1999 Maharashtra Legislative Assembly election : Kandhar
Party	Candidate	Votes	%	±%
SS	Chavan Rohidas Khobraji	39,662	33.12%	▼3.84
INC	Eshwarrao Narayanrao Bhosikar	31,865	26.61%	▲11.87
SBP	Shankar Anna Dhondge	25,507	21.30%	New
PWPI	Keshavrao Shankarrao Dhondge	17,894	14.94%	New
National Minorities Party	Rathod Devidas Chander	1,554	1.30%	New
Independent	Kamble Roopkumar Narayanrao	858	0.72%	New
Margin of victory		7,797	6.51%	▼6.43
Turnout		128,416	71.29%	▼5.01
Total valid votes		119,764		
Registered electors		180,140		▲2.03
SS hold		Swing	▼3.84	

=== Assembly Election 1995 ===
1995 Maharashtra Legislative Assembly election : Kandhar
Party	Candidate	Votes	%	±%
SS	Chavan Rohidas Khobraji	48,702	36.96%	▲16.25
Independent	Shankar Anna Dhondge	31,648	24.02%	New
INC	Pandagale Madhavrao Govindrao	19,420	14.74%	▼3.91
PWPI	Keshavrao Shankarrao Dhondge	16,994	12.90%	▼15.76
BBM	Kendre Babu Bhagawan	7,208	5.47%	New
Independent	Dr. Kendre Ramrao Tukaram	4,404	3.34%	New
Independent	Yannawar Ramdas Digambarrao	912	0.69%	New
Margin of victory		17,054	12.94%	▲4.98
Turnout		134,707	76.30%	▲14.41
Total valid votes		131,765		
Registered electors		176,550		▲1.82
SS gain from PWPI		Swing	▲8.30	

=== Assembly Election 1990 ===
1990 Maharashtra Legislative Assembly election : Kandhar
Party	Candidate	Votes	%	±%
PWPI	Keshavrao Shankarrao Dhondge	30,195	28.66%	▼32.60
SS	Chavan Rohidas Khobraji	21,815	20.71%	New
INC	Mukadam Venkatrao Devrao	19,650	18.65%	▼18.66
Independent	Gita Nagnath Shankarrao	17,989	17.08%	New
Independent	Wadje Shivraj Thoraji	6,360	6.04%	New
Independent	Sudhakar Mariba Kable	3,658	3.47%	New
BSP	Galapwad Pandurang Mahadu	1,271	1.21%	New
Independent	Pawar Vilas Ambaji	912	0.87%	New
Margin of victory		8,380	7.96%	▼15.99
Turnout		107,306	61.89%	▲0.57
Total valid votes		105,338		
Registered electors		173,390		▲26.70
PWPI hold		Swing	▼32.60	

=== Assembly Election 1985 ===
1985 Maharashtra Legislative Assembly election : Kandhar
Party	Candidate	Votes	%	±%
PWPI	Keshavrao Shankarrao Dhondge	50,461	61.26%	▲16.32
INC	Eshwarrao Narayanrao Bhosikar	30,732	37.31%	New
Independent	Shivaji Madhavrao Nalge	1,184	1.44%	New
Margin of victory		19,729	23.95%	▲23.87
Turnout		83,925	61.32%	▲8.45
Total valid votes		82,377		
Registered electors		136,855		▲8.07
PWPI gain from INC(I)		Swing	▲16.24	

=== Assembly Election 1980 ===
1980 Maharashtra Legislative Assembly election : Kandhar
Party	Candidate	Votes	%	±%
INC(I)	Eshwarrao Narayanrao Bhosikar	29,426	45.02%	New
PWPI	Kurude Gurunathrao Manikrao	29,371	44.94%	▲1.36
Independent	Pulkundwar Baburao Hiraman	3,602	5.51%	New
RPI(K)	Pawar Ramrao Namdeorao	2,480	3.79%	New
Independent	Mamde Anant Kishan	479	0.73%	New
Margin of victory		55	0.08%	▼15.12
Turnout		66,953	52.87%	▼6.99
Total valid votes		65,358		
Registered electors		126,636		▲7.18
INC(I) gain from PWPI		Swing	▲1.44	

=== Assembly Election 1978 ===
1978 Maharashtra Legislative Assembly election : Kandhar
Party	Candidate	Votes	%	±%
PWPI	Kurude Gurunathrao Manikrao	29,825	43.58%	▼14.72
INC	Bhoshikar Ishwar Rao Narayanrao	19,422	28.38%	▼8.65
Independent	More Ganpatrao Bhaurao	8,799	12.86%	New
Independent	Pulkundwar Baburao Hiraman	6,255	9.14%	New
Independent	Sonkamble Motiram Vithoba	2,532	3.70%	New
Independent	Bhujbal Rangnath Ramrao	1,610	2.35%	New
Margin of victory		10,403	15.20%	▼6.06
Turnout		70,726	59.86%	▲6.38
Total valid votes		68,443		
Registered electors		118,155		▲3.28
PWPI hold		Swing	▼14.72	

=== Assembly Election 1972 ===
1972 Maharashtra Legislative Assembly election : Kandhar
Party	Candidate	Votes	%	±%
PWPI	Keshavrao Shankarrao Dhondge	34,421	58.30%	▲5.37
INC	Madhavrao V. Jadhav	21,866	37.03%	▲6.11
RPI	Pundge. M. G	2,758	4.67%	New
Margin of victory		12,555	21.26%	▼0.75
Turnout		61,182	53.48%	▲5.04
Total valid votes		59,045		
Registered electors		114,401		▲13.83
PWPI hold		Swing	▲5.37	

=== Assembly Election 1967 ===
1967 Maharashtra Legislative Assembly election : Kandhar
Party	Candidate	Votes	%	±%
PWPI	Keshavrao Shankarrao Dhondge	23,871	52.93%	▼4.32
INC	S. S. Deshmukh	13,944	30.92%	▼3.19
Independent	G. S. Kamle	3,665	8.13%	New
Independent	M. P. Chaware	2,575	5.71%	New
ABJS	V. R. Venkatrao	1,047	2.32%	New
Margin of victory		9,927	22.01%	▼1.13
Turnout		48,689	48.44%	▲2.06
Total valid votes		45,102		
Registered electors		100,506		▲40.02
PWPI hold		Swing	▼4.32	

=== Assembly Election 1962 ===
1962 Maharashtra Legislative Assembly election : Kandhar
Party	Candidate	Votes	%	±%
PWPI	Keshavrao Shankarrao Dhondge	17,611	57.25%	▲40.65
INC	Sahebrao Sakoji	10,493	34.11%	▼26.29
Independent	Mangya Purbhaya	2,659	8.64%	New
Margin of victory		7,118	23.14%	▲9.33
Turnout		33,293	46.38%	▼4.95
Total valid votes		30,763		
Registered electors		71,782		▼20.88
PWPI gain from INC		Swing	▲26.85	

=== Assembly Election 1952 ===
1952 Hyderabad State Legislative Assembly election : Kandhar
Party	Candidate	Votes	%	±%
INC	Govind Rao Narsing Rao	14,159	30.40%	New
INC	Madhaw Rao Sawai	13,973	30.00%	New
PWPI	Sham Rao	7,729	16.60%	New
Socialist	Mohan Rao	6,683	14.35%	New
Socialist	Bhanudas Rao Sakharam Panth	4,029	8.65%	New
Margin of victory		6,430	13.81%	
Turnout		46,573	25.67%	
Total valid votes		46,573		
Registered electors		90,725		
INC win (new seat)				
