= Ravindra Vasantrao Chavan =

Indian politician

Ravindra Chavan-Patil

Member of Parliament, Lok Sabha
- Incumbent
- Assumed office 23 November 2024
- Preceded by: Vasantrao Balwantrao Chavan
- Constituency: Nanded

Personal details
- Born: 9 December 1981 (age 44) Naigaon
- Party: Indian National Congress
- Parent(s): Vasantrao B. Chavan Patil; Sundarbai V.B. Chavan
- Education: Msc agri

Ravindra Vasantrao Chavan Patil is an Indian politician from Maharashtra serving as a member of the Lok Sabha for Nanded constituency, elected in a by-poll in November 2024 with a slim margin of 1,457 votes.

== Political career ==
Chavan was a public figure in his hometown of Naigaon from a young age, as politics runs in his family. His grandfather was an MLA, while his father was his father was an MLA twice and an MLC once, as well as the MP of the Nanded district. Chavan is one of the youngest MPs in Maharashtra.

Lok Sabha
Preceded by Vasantrao Balwantrao Chavan	Member of Parliament for Nanded; 2024 – present	Succeeded by present
