= Bhimrao Keram =

Indian politician

Bhimrao Ramji Keram

Member of Maharashtra Legislative Assembly
- Incumbent
- Assumed office 24 October 2019
- Constituency: Kinwat

Personal details
- Born: 15 August 1966 (age 59) Kinwat, Maharashtra, India
- Party: Bharatiya Janata Party

Bhimrao Ramji Keram is an Indian politician from Maharashtra. He was elected to the Maharashtra Legislative Assembly from Kinwat in the 2019 Maharashtra Legislative Assembly election representing Bharatiya Janata Party and retained it in the 2024 Assembly election.
