= Balaji Kalyankar =

Indian politician

Member of the Maharashtra Legislative Assembly
- Incumbent
- Assumed office October 2019
- Preceded by: D. P. Sawant
- Constituency: Nanded North

Personal details
- Party: Shiv Sena

Balaji Devidasrao Kalyankar is a Shiv Sena politician from Nanded district, Maharashtra, India. He was a Member of Legislative Assembly from Nanded North Vidhan Sabha constituency as a member of Shiv Sena.

== Positions held ==
- 2017: Corporator, Nanded-Waghala Municipal Corporation
- 2019-2024 and 2024: MLA, Nanded (North).
