= Tushar Rathod =

Indian politician

Member of the Maharashtra Legislative Assembly
- Incumbent
- Assumed office 2015
- Preceded by: Govind Mukkaji Rathod
- Constituency: Mukhed

Personal details
- Born: 23 December 1978 (age 47) Mukhed, Nanded district
- Party: Bharatiya Janata Party
- Spouse: Jyotsna
- Education: Bachelor of Medicine, Bachelor of Surgery; Diploma in Medical Radiology and Electrology
- Occupation: Doctor, Politician

Dr. Tushar Govindrao Rathod is an Indian politician. He was elected to the Maharashtra Legislative Assembly from Mukhed in the 2014 Maharashtra Legislative Assembly election (by poll) for first time and again in 2019 Maharashtra Legislative Assembly election as a member of Bharatiya Janata Party.
