= Venkatarao Tarodekar =

Indian politician

Venkatrao Tarodekar

Member of Parliament, Lok Sabha
- In office 1967-1977
- Preceded by: Tulsidas Jadhav
- Succeeded by: Keshavrao Dhondage
- Constituency: Nanded

Personal details
- Born: 20 September 1925 Taroda, British India
- Died: 7 May 1979 (aged 53) Nanded, India
- Party: Indian National Congress
- Spouse: Luxmibai

Venkatrao Babarao Tarodekar was an Indian politician. He was elected to the Lok Sabha, the lower house of the Parliament of India as a member of the Indian National Congress.
