= Vasantrao Balwantrao Chavan =

Indian politician (1954–2024)

Vasantrao Chavan

Member of Parliament, Lok Sabha
- In office 4 June 2024 – 26 August 2024
- Preceded by: Prataprao Govindrao Chikhalikar
- Succeeded by: Ravindra Vasantrao Chavan
- Constituency: Nanded, Maharashtra

Member of Maharashtra Legislative Assembly
- In office (2009–2014), (2014 – 2019)
- Preceded by: Constituency Established
- Succeeded by: Rajesh Sambhaji Pawar
- Constituency: Naigaon

Member of Maharashtra Legislative Council
- In office February 2002 – February 2008

Personal details
- Born: Vasantrao Balwantrao Chavan Patil; 15 August 1954 Naigaon, Bombay State, India (present-day Maharashtra)
- Died: 26 August 2024 (aged 70) Hyderabad, Telangana, India
- Party: Indian National Congress (2014-2024)
- Other political affiliations: Independent (2009-2014); Nationalist Congress Party (1999- 2009); Indian National Congress (Till 1999)
- Spouse: Sundarbai V.B. Chavan (m. 1976)
- Children: Ravindra Vasantrao Chavan
- Parent(s): Balwantrao Chavan Patil; Kalawatibai B. Chavan
- Education: B.Com (II Year)
- Source: [Lok Sabha Secretariat]

Vasant Balwantrao Chavan Patil (V.B. Chavan Patil) (15 August 1954 – 26 August 2024) was an Indian politician and Senior congress leader from Maharashtra.

== Political career ==
Vasantrao Chavan's family is large. Vasantrao's father Balwantrao Chavan was also an MLA. He was close to Sharad Pawar. Vasantrao hails from one of the largest families of Amitrao Chavan, whose political dominance has persisted in Naigaon, Biloli, and Deglur Talukas & Nanded district. He became the Sarpanch for the first time in 1978 and Later, he served as a member of Nanded Zilla Parishad from 1990 to 2002 but was soon elected to the Member of Maharashtra State Legislative Council in 2002 till 2008 and He was elected as an independent member of the Maharashtra Legislative Assembly representing Naigaon Assembly constituency in 2009. In May 2014, he was appointed to the Legislative Assembly's Public Accounts Committee. He joined the Indian National Congress party in September 2014 and was re-elected to the 13th Maharashtra Assembly as a Congress party member.

In the 2024 Lok Sabha election, he was elected to the 18th Lok Sabha representing Nanded constituency. He was trustee and Chairperson of Janta Highschool and College of Agriculture in Naigaon.

Chavan died on 26 August 2024, at the age of 70. He was also the chairman of Nanded District Central Cooperative Bank from 2021 to 2023.

Lok Sabha
| Preceded by Prataprao Govindrao Chikhalikar | Member of Parliament for Nanded; 2024 – 2024 | Succeeded by Ravindra Vasantrao Chavan |
