= Rajesh Sambhaji Pawar =

Indian politician

Member of the Maharashtra Legislative Assembly
- Incumbent
- Assumed office 2019
- Preceded by: Vasantrao Balwantrao Chavan
- Constituency: Naigaon

Personal details
- Born: 14 May 1972 (age 52); Nanded, Maharashtra
- Political party: Bharatiya Janata Party
- Education: B. E. (Mechanical Engineering)

Rajesh Pawar is an Indian politician and BJP leader from Nanded district. He defeated Vasantrao Balwantrao Chavan sitting Congress MLA & Meenal Patil Khatgaonkar from Naigaon Assembly constituency in 2019 & 2024 election respectively.
