= 2024 Wayanad by-election =

Lok Sabha by-election

- 13 November 2024

Wayanad constituency
- Turnout: 64.22% ▼9.35%
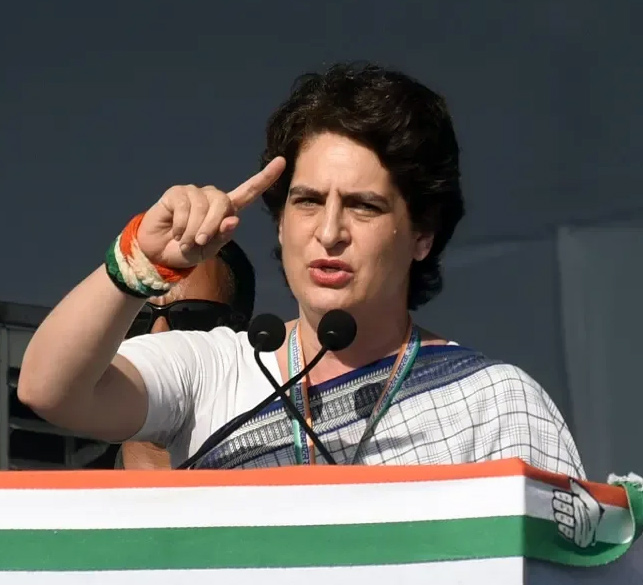

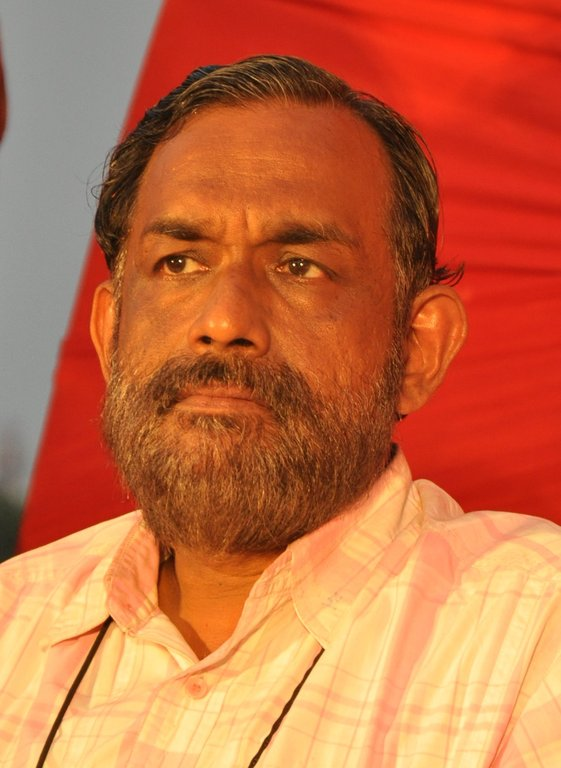
| | First party | Second party |
|---|---|---|
| Candidate | Priyanka Gandhi | Sathyan Mokeri |
| Party | INC | CPI |
| Popular vote | 6,22,338 | 2,11,407 |
| Percentage | 64.99% | 22.08% |
| Swing | ▲5.30% | ▼4.01% |
MP before election
Rahul Gandhi
INC
Elected MP
Priyanka Gandhi
INC

Wayanad Lok Sabha by-election was held on 13 November 2024. In the previous election held months prior, Congress leader Rahul Gandhi was elected from two seats, Wayanad and Rae Bareli. Indian law states that while one can contest multiple seats in an election, they can only remain an MP for one. Thus, Gandhi resigned from Wayanad thereby causing a by-election. His sister, Priyanka Gandhi, made a long-awaited electoral debut in the seat, making the election notable. With the results being released on 23 November, she won the seat with a large margin - but below the 5 lakh target set by the Congress.

== Background ==
In the 2024 general elections, Rahul Gandhi contested from two Lok Sabha constituencies, Wayanad and Rae Bareli. He won both the seats by more than 3.5 lakh votes. Rahul announced that he would remain a member of the Lok Sabha from Rae Bareilly and resigned from Wayanad. On 21 October 2024, Election Commission of India announced the schedule for Wayanad Lok Sabha constituency. Maharashtra and Jharkhand assembly elections and various state assembly by-elections were announced on the same day.

== Result ==
2024 by-election: Wayanad
| Party | Candidate | Votes | % | ±% |
|---|---|---|---|---|
| INC | Priyanka Gandhi | 622,338 | 64.99 | ▲5.3 |
| CPI | Sathyan Mokeri | 2,11,407 | 22.08 | ▼4.01 |
| BJP | Navya Haridas | 1,09,939 | 11.48 | ▼1.51 |
| NOTA | None of the above | 5,406 | 0.57 | ▼0.5 |
| Majority | | 4,10,931 | 42.9 | ▲9.32 |
| Turnout | | 9,57,571 | 64.22 | ▼9.35 |
| INC hold | | Swing | | |

== Previous result ==
2024 Indian general election: Wayanad
| Party | Candidate | Votes | % | ±% |
|---|---|---|---|---|
| INC | Rahul Gandhi | 647,445 | 59.69 | ▼5.25 |
| CPI | Annie Raja | 283,023 | 26.09 | ▲0.85 |
| BJP | K. Surendran | 141,045 | 13.00 | ▲6.75 |
| NOTA | None of the above | 6,999 | 0.65 | |
| Majority | | 364,422 | 33.59 | ▼6.09 |
| Turnout | | 10,846,53 | 73.57 | ▼6.8 |
| INC hold | | Swing | ▼5.25 | |

Percentage change (±) denotes the change in the number of votes from the immediate previous election.

== See also ==
- 2024 elections in India
