= Wayanad Lok Sabha constituency =

Constituency of the Indian parliament in Kerala

Coordinates: 11.634°N 75.992°E

Wayanad KL-4
- Lok Sabha constituency

Constituency details
- Country: India
- Region: South India
- State: Kerala
- Assembly constituencies: Mananthavady; Sulthan Bathery; Kalpetta; Thiruvambady; Eranad; Nilambur; Wandoor
- Established: 2009
- Total electors: 1,357,819 (2019)
- Reservation: None

Member of Parliament
- 18th Lok Sabha
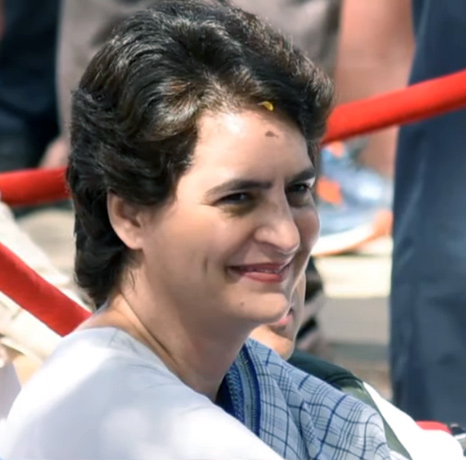
- Incumbent Priyanka Gandhi
- Party: INC
- Alliance: UDF
- Elected year: 2024

Wayanad Lok Sabha constituency is one of the 20 Lok Sabha (parliamentary) constituencies in Kerala state in southern India. It comprises parts of Kozhikode, Malappuram, and the entire Wayanad district.

== Assembly segments ==
Wayanad Parliamentary Constituency is composed of 56 LSG segments of the following Kerala Legislative Assembly Constituencies:

No	Name	District	Member	Party	2024 Lead
17	Mananthavady(ST)	Wayanad	Usha Vijayan	INC	INC
18	Sulthan Bathery(ST)	Wayanad	I. C. Balakrishnan	INC	INC
19	Kalpetta	Wayanad	T. Siddique	INC	INC
32	Thiruvambady	Kozhikode	C. K. Kasim	IUML	INC
34	Eranad	Malappuram	P. K. Basheer	IUML	INC
35	Nilambur	Malappuram	Aryadan Shoukath	INC	INC
36	Wandoor(SC)	Malappuram	A. P. Anil Kumar	INC	INC

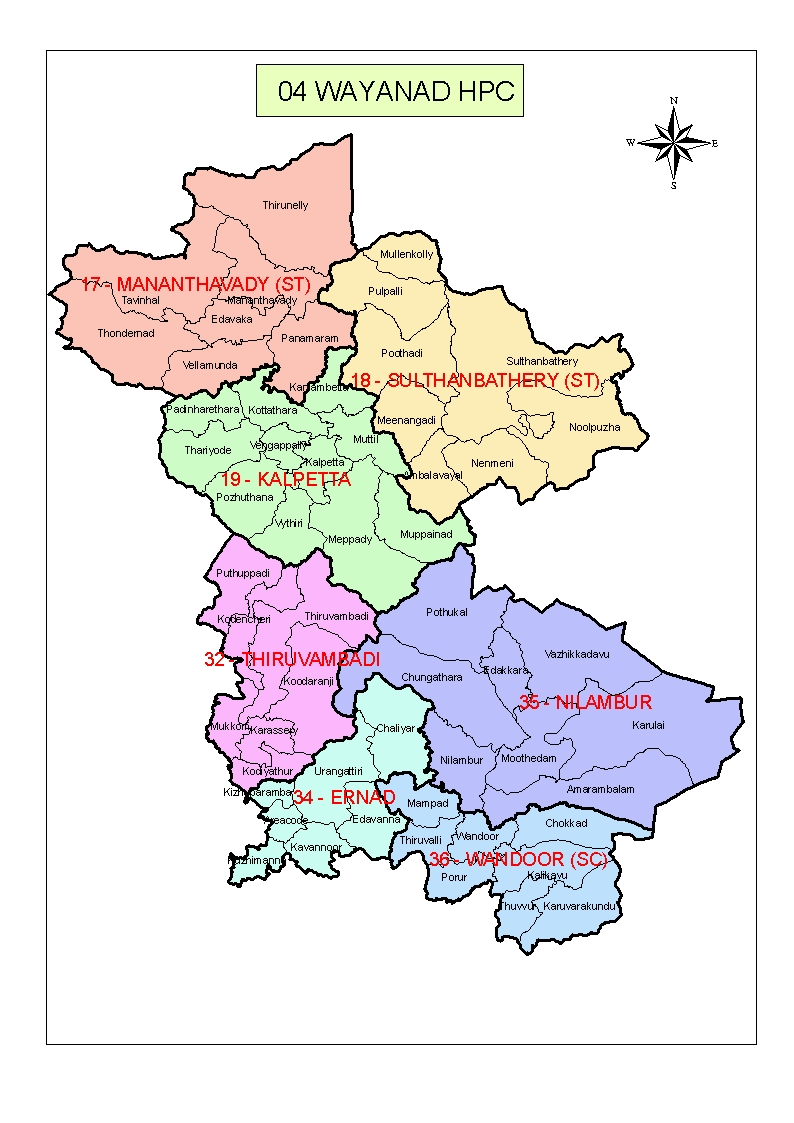

== Members of Parliament ==
Year	Member	Party
2009	M. I. Shanavas	Indian National Congress
2014	M. I. Shanavas	Indian National Congress
2019	Rahul Gandhi	Indian National Congress
2024	Rahul Gandhi	Indian National Congress
2024 (Note: By-election.)	Priyanka Gandhi Vadra	Indian National Congress

== Election results ==
Vote share of Winning candidates
2024 (By-Poll)	64.99%
2024	59.69%
2019	64.94%
2014	41.21%
2009	49.86%

=== General Elections 2029 ===
2029 Indian general election: Wayanad
Party	Candidate	Votes	%	±%
INC				
LDF				
NDA				
NOTA	None of the above			
Margin of victory				
Turnout				
		Swing		

=== 2024 by-election ===
Congress leader Rahul Gandhi, who was elected from two seats, Wayanad and Rae Bareli, resigned from Wayanad thereby causing a by-election. Priyanka Gandhi Vadra had won by a margin of 4,10,931 votes.

2024 by-election: Wayanad
Party	Candidate	Votes	%	±%
INC	Priyanka Gandhi	622,338	64.99	▲5.3
CPI	Sathyan Mokeri	211,407	22.08	▼4.01
BJP	Navya Haridas	109,939	11.48	▼1.51
NOTA	None of the above	5,406	0.57	▼0.5
Majority		4,10,931	42.9	▲9.32
Turnout		9,57,571	64.22	▼9.35
INC hold		Swing	▲5.3	

By Assembly Segments (2024)

No.	Constituency	Party	Lead
17	Mananthavady	INC	42,773
18	Sulthan Bathery	INC	54,263
19	Kalpetta	INC	58,090
32	Thiruvambady	INC	50,298
34	Eranad	INC	64,204
35	Nilambur	INC	65,132
36	Wandoor (SC)	INC	73,276

=== General elections 2024 ===
2024 Indian general election: Wayanad
Party	Candidate	Votes	%	±%
INC	Rahul Gandhi	647,445	59.69	▼5.25
CPI	Annie Raja	283,023	26.09	▲0.85
BJP	K. Surendran	141,045	13.00	▲6.75
BSP	P. R. Krishnankutty	1,973	0.18	
Independent	K. P. Sathyan	1,059	0.10	
Independent	A. C. Sinoj	903	0.08	
Independent	Praseetha Azhikode	840	0.08	
Independent	Ajeeb Muhammed	804	0.07	
Independent	P. Radhakrishnan	562	0.05	
NOTA	None of the above	6,999	0.65	
Majority		3,64,422	33.59	▼7.09
Turnout		10,86,459	74.19	
INC hold		Swing	▼5.25	

By Assembly Segments
No.	Status (Assembly Constituency)	Votes			Lead
No.	Status (Assembly Constituency)	Rahul Gandhi	Annie Raja	K. Surendran	Lead
17	Mananthavady (ST)	79,026	40,305	25,503	38,721
18	Sulthan Bathery (ST)	84,439	40,458	35,709	43,981
19	Kalpetta	88,786	39,129	24,431	49,657
32	Thiruvambady	83,219	36,663	13,374	46,556
34	Eranad	95,194	37,451	9,723	57,743
35	Nilambur	99,325	42,962	17,520	56,363
36	Wandoor (SC)	112,310	43,626	13,608	68,684

=== General elections 2019 ===
2019 Indian general election: Wayanad
Party	Candidate	Votes	%	±%
INC	Rahul Gandhi	706,367	64.94	▲23.73
CPI	P. P. Suneer	274,597	25.24	▼13.68
BDJS	Thushar Vellappally	78,816	7.25	N/A
SDPI	Babu Mani	5,426	0.50	▼1.07
Margin of victory		431,770	39.69	37.41
Turnout		1,087,783	80.37	6.77
Registered electors		1,359,679		8.82
INC hold		Swing	▲23.73	

By Assembly Segments
No.	Status (Assembly Constituency)	Votes			Lead
No.	Status (Assembly Constituency)	Rahul Gandhi	P. P. Suneer	Thushar Vellappally	Lead
17	Mananthavady (ST)	93,237	38,606	13,916	54,631
18	Sulthan Bathery (ST)	110,697	40,232	17,602	70,635
19	Kalpetta	101,229	37,475	14,122	63,754
32	Thiruvambady	91,152	36,681	7,767	54,471
34	Eranad	92,909	36,382	6,133	56,521
35	Nilambur	103,862	42,202	10,749	61,660
36	Wandoor (SC)	111,948	42,393	8,301	69,555

=== General elections 2014 ===
2014 Indian general election: Wayanad
Party	Candidate	Votes	%	±%
INC	M. I. Shanavas	377,035	41.21	▼8.66
CPI	Sathyan Mokeri	356,165	38.92	▲7.69
BJP	P. R. Rasmilnath	80,752	8.83	▲4.98
Independent	P. V. Anvar	37,123	4.06	N/A
SDPI	Jaleel Neelambra	14,327	1.57	New
WPOI	Ramla Mampad	12,645	1.38	New
NOTA	None of the Above	10,735	1.17	N/A
AAP	P. P. A. Sageer	10,684	1.17	New
Independent	Sathyan Thazhemangad	5,476	0.60	N/A
Margin of victory		20,870	2.28	▼16.35
Turnout		915,006	73.25	▼1.50
Registered electors		1,249,420		▲13.37
INC hold		Swing	▼8.66	

By Assembly Segments
No.	Status (Assembly Constituency)	Votes			Lead
No.	Status (Assembly Constituency)	M. I. Shanavas	Sathyan Mokeri	P. R. Rasmilnath	Lead
17	Mananthavady (ST)	47,619	56,285	12,950	8,666
18	Sulthan Bathery (ST)	54,182	63,165	18,918	8,983
19	Kalpetta	53,383	51,503	12,824	1,880
32	Thiruvambady	49,349	46,964	6,153	2,385
34	Eranad	56,566	37,728	6,163	18,838
35	Nilambur	55,403	52,137	13,120	3,266
36	Wandoor (SC)	60,249	47,982	10,571	12,267

=== General elections 2009 ===
2009 Indian general election: Wayanad
Party	Candidate	Votes	%	±%
INC	M. I. Shanavas	410,703	49.86	
CPI	M. Rahmathulla	257,264	31.23	
NCP	K. Muraleedharan	99,663	12.10	
BJP	C. Vasudevan Master	31,687	3.85	
Independent	Rahmathulla Pooladan	6,459	0.78	
Independent	Shanavas Malappuram	4,015	0.49	
Margin of victory		153,439	18.63	
Turnout		823,694	74.76	New
Registered electors		1,102,097		
INC win (new seat)				

By Assembly Segments (2009)

No.	Constituency	Party	Lead
17	Mananthavady	INC	19,403
18	Sulthan Bathery	INC	19,140
19	Kalpetta	INC	24,049
32	Thiruvambady	INC	21,414
34	Eranad	INC	22,105
35	Nilambur	INC	21,267
36	Wandoor (SC)	INC	25,690

== See also ==
- 2019 Indian general election in Kerala
