= M. I. Shanavas =

Indian politician (1951–2018)

M.I. Shanavas
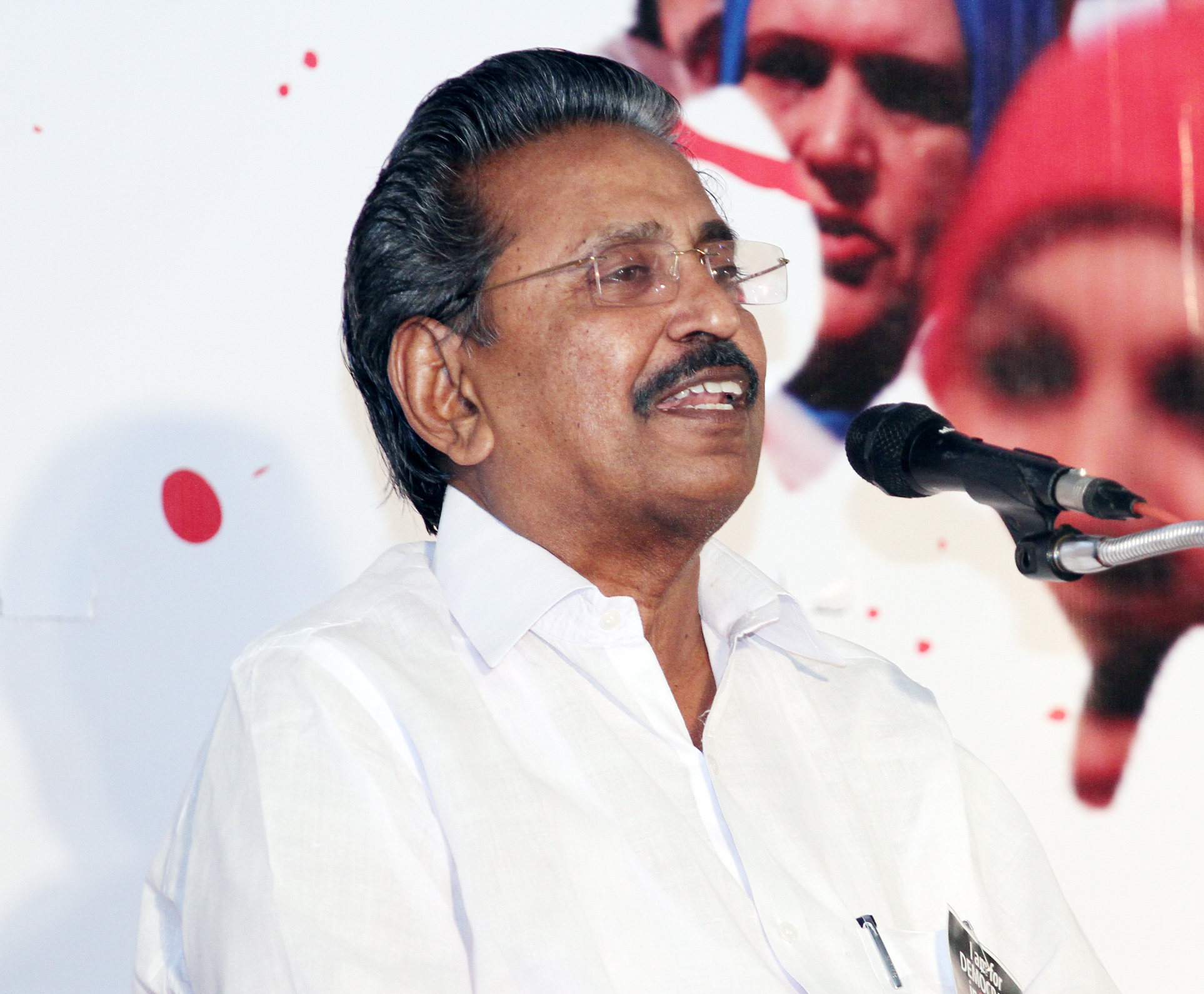
- Shanavas in 2013

Member of Parliament, Lok Sabha
- In office 2009–2018
- Preceded by: (new constituency)
- Succeeded by: Rahul Gandhi
- Constituency: Wayanad, Kerala

Personal details
- Born: 22 September 1951 Kottayam, Travancore–Cochin, India
- Died: 21 November 2018 (aged 67) Chennai, Tamil Nadu, India
- Party: Indian National Congress
- Spouse: Jubairiyat Begum
- Parent(s): Ibrahim Kutty, Noorjahan Begum

Mohammed Ibrahim Shanavas (22 September 1951 – 21 November 2018) was an Indian politician. He was the working president of the Kerala Pradesh Congress Committee and a Member of Parliament of the 16th Lok Sabha of India.

== Biography ==
M. I. Shanavas represented the Wayanad constituency and was a member of the Indian National Congress. He was a member of the Kerala Pradesh Congress Committee since 1983. He won the 2009 Lok Sabha election from Wayanad.

== Death ==
Shanavas died on 21 November 2018 in Chennai, following complications from a liver transplant.

Lok Sabha
Preceded by Constituency Created	Member of Parliament for Wayanad; 2009–2018	Succeeded by Rahul Gandhi
