= Priyanka Gandhi =

Indian politician (born 1972)

Priyanka Gandhi Vadra
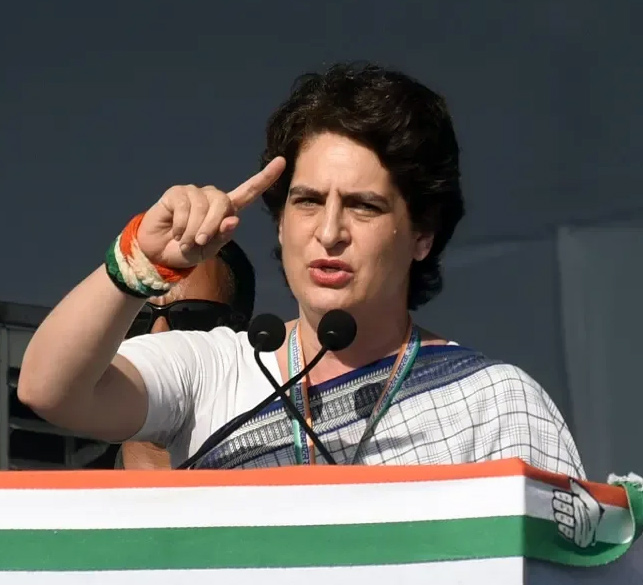
- Vadra in 2019

Member of Parliament, Lok Sabha
- Incumbent
- Assumed office 23 November 2024
- Preceded by: Rahul Gandhi
- Constituency: Wayanad, Kerala

General Secretary of Indian National Congress
- Incumbent
- Assumed office 4 February 2019
- AICC President: Rahul Gandhi; Sonia Gandhi (interim); Mallikarjun Kharge

General Secretary of AICC for Uttar Pradesh (Note: Initially appointed as General Secretary for Eastern Uttar Pradesh.)
- In office 4 February 2019 – 23 December 2023
- AICC President: Rahul Gandhi; Sonia Gandhi (interim); Mallikarjun Kharge
- Succeeded by: Avinash Pandey

Personal details
- Born: 12 January 1972 (age 54) New Delhi, Delhi, India
- Party: Indian National Congress
- Spouse: Robert Vadra (m. 1997)
- Children: 2
- Parents: Rajiv Gandhi (father); Sonia Gandhi (mother)
- Relatives: See Nehru–Gandhi family
- Education: Jesus and Mary College; University of Sunderland

Priyanka Gandhi Vadra (née Gandhi; born 12 January 1972) is an Indian politician who is serving as the member of the Lok Sabha for Wayanad, Kerala, since November 2024. A member of the Indian National Congress, she is also serving as a general secretary of the All India Congress Committee (AICC).

Gandhi Vadra is a member of the politically prominent Nehru–Gandhi family. She is also a trustee of the Rajiv Gandhi Foundation.

== Early life and education ==
Priyanka Gandhi was born in Delhi on 12 January 1972 to Rajiv Gandhi and Sonia Gandhi as the younger of their two children. Her older brother, Rahul Gandhi, is a member of Parliament from Rae Bareli in Uttar Pradesh and the 12th Leader of the Opposition in Lok Sabha. She is the granddaughter of Indira Gandhi, the former Prime Minister of India, and Feroze Gandhi, a freedom fighter and politician, and the great-granddaughter of India's first Prime Minister, Jawaharlal Nehru.

Gandhi did her schooling at Welham Girls' School in Dehradun until 1984. After this, both Rahul and she were moved to day schools in Delhi due to security reasons. After the assassination of Indira Gandhi, because of constant terror threats, she and her brother Rahul were home-schooled. Later, she joined the Convent of Jesus and Mary, Delhi. She then completed a bachelor's degree in Psychology from Jesus and Mary College, New Delhi, and a master's degree in Buddhist studies from University of Sunderland in 2010.

In 1997, she married Robert Vadra, a Delhi-based businessman, and started using the name Priyanka Gandhi Vadra. The couple has two children: a son named Raihan and a daughter named Miraya. She is a Buddhist and practices vipassana. After being asked to vacate her government-allotted accommodation at Lodhi Estate in Delhi, Gandhi moved to Gurugram, Haryana.

== Political career ==
=== Formative years ===
Gandhi Vadra regularly visited the Congress constituencies of Rae Bareli and Amethi, where she interacted directly with residents. In the 2004 Indian general election, she served as her mother's Rae Bareli campaign manager and assisted in overseeing her brother Rahul's Amethi campaign. During the 2007 Uttar Pradesh Legislative Assembly election, while her brother managed the statewide campaign, she concentrated on the ten seats in the Amethi and Rae Bareli region, spending two weeks addressing infighting among party workers over seat allocations. This involvement made her a known figure with significant support in these areas, leading to the election slogan in Amethi, "Amethi ka Danka, Bitiya Priyanka" (the clarion call from Amethi is for Priyanka to stand for elections).

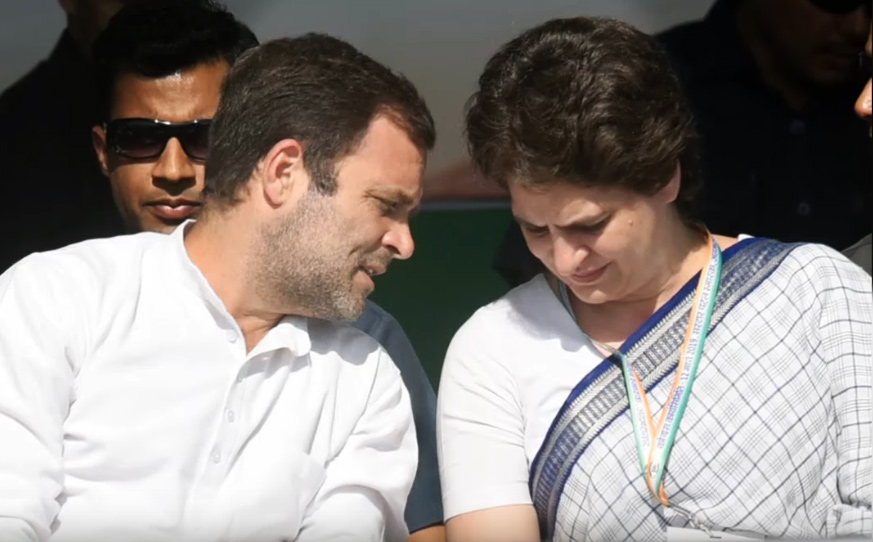
Priyanka (right) and her brother Rahul (left) at an election rally in 2019

On 23 January 2019, she formally entered politics after being appointed as the AICC General Secretary in charge of the eastern part of Uttar Pradesh and then as the General Secretary in charge of the entire state of Uttar Pradesh on 11 September 2020.

In October 2021, Gandhi Vadra was detained twice by the Uttar Pradesh Police. The first detention followed her visit to Lakhimpur Kheri in western UP where eight people were killed following clashes between protesting farmers and the convey of Union Minister Ajay Misra's son. She and several other party leaders were detained at a PAC guest house in Sitapur, which was being used as a temporary jail to keep them for over 50 hrs. The second detention took place in the district of Agra where the Uttar Pradesh Police detained her citing a ban on gatherings, while on her way to Agra to meet the family members of a man who allegedly died in police custody.

==== 2022 Uttar Pradesh Legislative Assembly election ====
Gandhi Vadra launched the Congress party's Uttar Pradesh poll campaign from Barabanki on 23 October 2021.

In January 2022, she launched the Congress's manifesto for the 2022 Uttar Pradesh Legislative Assembly election along with her brother Rahul. The manifesto was focused on youth and women empowerment, along with development for the state and also promised 40% of tickets to women in the upcoming Uttar Pradesh assembly polls.

Pivoting the campaign on women's empowerment and participation in politics, she kick-started the "Ladki hoon, Lad Sakti hoon" meaning "I am a girl and I can fight" campaign in the state. Gandhi Vadra also announced that 40% of the candidates fielded by the party for the assembly elections would be women. On the day of International Women's Day, she launched a rally in the state's capital Lucknow which, laced with several promises and hopes, saw the participation of women from all over the state.

Despite all her attempts to revive the party in Uttar Pradesh, the Congress Party faced a rout in the assembly election, winning just 2 out of the 403 assembly seats. Gandhi Vadra resigned as AICC General Secretary in charge of Uttar Pradesh in December 2023.

Following the Congress' defeat in the state elections, on 5 August 2022, she took part in Congress's ‘Mehangai Par Halla Bol’ protest against price-rise and inflation and was detained by the Delhi Police.

=== Member of Parliament ===
After extensively campaigning for the Congress during the 2024 Indian general election and taking a more organisational role within the party, Gandhi Vadra announced that she would join electoral politics and contest as the party's candidate for the Wayanad bypoll, to succeed her brother, Rahul. She won the election by a margin of 4,10,931 votes. She serves in Parliament alongside her mother Sonia and brother Rahul. She and her brother are the only sibling duo serving together in the 18th Lok Sabha.

== Electoral history ==
Year	Election	Party	Constituency Name	Result	Votes gained	Vote share%	Margin
2024 by-election	18th Lok Sabha	INC	Wayanad	Won	6,22,338	64.99%	4,10,931

== See also ==
- List of political families
- Nehru-Gandhi family
