= Kamalkishor Kadam =

Indian Politician and Educationist

Kamalkishor Kadam is an Indian politician who formerly served as Higher and Technical Education Minister in the Government of Maharashtra. He belongs to the Nationalist Congress Party from Nanded, Maharashtra.

He is chairman and trustee of the Mahatma Gandhi Mission Trust that runs various colleges in Maharashtra and Noida, Uttar Pradesh.

In 2004, the Comptroller and Auditor General of India (CAG) issued a report wherein Kadam was enlisted among various other politicians of Indian National Congress and Nationalist Congress Party for irregularities in the purchase of land plots from CIDCO.

On 24 February 2023, Maharashtra Governor and Chancellor of state universities, Ramesh Bais conferred Honorary D.Litt. on Kamal Kishor Kadam during 25th Annual Convocation of the Swami Ramanand Teerth Marathwada University, Nanded through online mode.
