= Naigaon Assembly constituency =

Constituency of the Maharashtra legislative assembly in India

Coordinates: 18.849°N 77.531°E

Naigaon
- Constituency No. 89 for the Maharashtra Legislative Assembly

Constituency details
- Country: India
- Region: Western India
- State: Maharashtra
- District: Nanded
- Lok Sabha constituency: Nanded
- Established: 2008
- Total electors: 310,610
- Reservation: None

Member of Legislative Assembly
- 15th Maharashtra Legislative Assembly
- Incumbent Rajesh Sambhaji Pawar
- Party: Bharatiya Janata Party
- Elected year: 2024

Naigaon Assembly constituency (formerly Naigaum) is one of the 288 Vidhan Sabha (legislative assembly) constituencies of Maharashtra state, western India. This constituency is located in Nanded district. The delimitation of the constituency happened in 2008.

== Geographical scope ==
The constituency comprises Umri taluka, Dharmabad taluka and Naigaon taluka.

== Members of the Legislative Assembly ==
Year	Member	Party
Till 2009 : Constituency did not exist
2009	Vasantrao Chavan	Independent
2014	Vasantrao Chavan	Indian National Congress
2019	Rajesh Pawar	Bharatiya Janata Party
2024	Rajesh Pawar	Bharatiya Janata Party

== Election results ==
=== Assembly Election 2024 ===
2024 Maharashtra Legislative Assembly election : Naigaon
Party	Candidate	Votes	%	±%
BJP	Rajesh Sambhaji Pawar	129,192	55.81%	▼0.51
INC	Dr. Meenal Patil Khatgaonkar	81,563	35.24%	▲4.92
VBA	Dr. Madhav Sambhajirao Vibhute	16,043	6.93%	▼4.07
PHJSP	Gajanan Shankarrao Chavan	2,144	0.93%	New
NOTA	None of the Above	743	0.32%	▼0.14
Margin of victory		47,629	20.58%	▼5.44
Turnout		232,219	74.76%	▲0.76
Total valid votes		231,476		
Registered electors		310,610		▲9.60
BJP hold		Swing	▼0.51	

=== Assembly Election 2019 ===
2019 Maharashtra Legislative Assembly election : Naigaon
Party	Candidate	Votes	%	±%
BJP	Rajesh Sambhaji Pawar	117,750	56.33%	▲25.57
INC	Vasantrao Balwantrao Chavan	63,366	30.31%	▼5.74
VBA	Marotrao Vyankatrao Kawale Guruji	23,005	11.00%	New
NOTA	None of the Above	960	0.46%	▼0.19
Margin of victory		54,384	26.01%	▲20.72
Turnout		210,142	74.15%	▲3.43
Total valid votes		209,051		
Registered electors		283,413		▲1.19
BJP gain from INC		Swing	▲20.27	

=== Assembly Election 2014 ===
2014 Maharashtra Legislative Assembly election : Naigaon
Party	Candidate	Votes	%	±%
INC	Vasantrao Balwantrao Chavan	71,020	36.05%	New
BJP	Rajesh Sambhajirao Pawar	60,595	30.76%	▲21.52
NCP	Deshmukh Shriniwas Balajirao	57,247	29.06%	▼1.61
BSP	Sayyad Ismail S. Khajamiya	3,098	1.57%	▼0.37
SS	Ambadwar Babarao Jamanaji	3,087	1.57%	New
NOTA	None of the Above	1,277	0.65%	New
Margin of victory		10,425	5.29%	▼1.21
Turnout		198,404	70.84%	▼0.25
Total valid votes		196,997		
Registered electors		280,093		▲15.66
INC gain from Independent		Swing	▼1.12	

=== Assembly Election 2009 ===
2009 Maharashtra Legislative Assembly election : Naigaon
Party	Candidate	Votes	%	±%
Independent	Vasantrao Balwantrao Chavan	63,534	37.17%	New
NCP	Deshmukh Shrinivas Alis Bapusaheb Gorthekar	52,414	30.67%	New
JSS	Bachewar Balaji Ganeshrao	16,688	9.76%	New
BJP	Thakkarwad Laxmanrao Gangaram	15,788	9.24%	New
Independent	Belkonikar Surendra Balkrishnarao	6,705	3.92%	New
Independent	Sontakke Laxman Kisan	6,038	3.53%	New
BSP	Bodhankar Satishkumar Ambadasrao	3,313	1.94%	New
Margin of victory		11,120	6.51%	▼23.36
Turnout		170,999	70.61%	▲22.03
Total valid votes		170,915		
Registered electors		242,163		▲56.68
Independent gain from INC		Swing	▼22.39	

=== Assembly By-election 2006 ===
2006 Maharashtra Legislative Assembly by-election : Naigaon
Party	Candidate	Votes	%	±%
INC	Kolambkar Kalidas Nilkanth	44,694	59.56%	▲29.62
SS	Shradoha S. Jadhav	22,283	29.70%	▼26.97
BBM	M.M.Sansare	4,105	5.47%	▲4.85
Abhinav Bharat Sangh	Jairam Baliram Talake	3,044	4.06%	New
Independent	Gandhi Dilip Ramchandra	570	0.76%	New
Margin of victory		22,411	29.87%	▲3.15
Turnout		75,039	48.55%	▼4.20
Total valid votes		75,038		
Registered electors		154,559		▼0.33
INC gain from SS		Swing	▲2.90	

=== Assembly Election 2004 ===
2004 Maharashtra Legislative Assembly election : Naigaon
Party	Candidate	Votes	%	±%
SS	Kolambkar Kalidas Nilkanth	46,353	56.66%	▼4.94
INC	Rupawate Premanand Dadasaheb	24,495	29.94%	New
Independent	Manoj Martandrao Sansare	6,973	8.52%	New
BSP	Sabir Shaikh	2,116	2.59%	New
Independent	Sneha Gopichand More	880	1.08%	New
BBM	Chandrakant Maruti Tambe	507	0.62%	▼17.70
Margin of victory		21,858	26.72%	▼16.57
Turnout		81,815	52.76%	▲3.99
Total valid votes		81,803		
Registered electors		155,068		▲4.14
SS hold		Swing	▼4.94	

=== Assembly Election 1999 ===
1999 Maharashtra Legislative Assembly election : Naigaon
Party	Candidate	Votes	%	±%
SS	Kolambkar Kalidas Nilkanth	44,733	61.61%	▲1.35
BBM	Satish Pednekar	13,303	18.32%	▲14.78
Independent	Kamble Chadrakant Mahadeo	7,027	9.68%	New
Independent	Manoj Martandrao Sansare	5,269	7.26%	New
ABS	Suhas Shyamrao Kale	1,218	1.68%	New
Independent	Sudhir Laxman Hindlekar	1,060	1.46%	New
Margin of victory		31,430	43.29%	▲10.28
Turnout		72,616	48.77%	▼17.73
Total valid votes		72,610		
Registered electors		148,903		▲3.96
SS hold		Swing	▲1.35	

=== Assembly Election 1995 ===
1995 Maharashtra Legislative Assembly election : Naigaon
Party	Candidate	Votes	%	±%
SS	Kolambkar Kalidas Nilkanth	57,383	60.25%	▲11.76
INC	Vilas Vishnu Sawant	25,948	27.25%	▼13.63
JD	Dattaram Savalaram Rajeshirke	4,451	4.67%	▼4.47
BBM	Advocate G. D. Ghokshe	3,376	3.54%	New
Independent	Ulhas Achyut Panchal	986	1.04%	New
RPI(K)	Jadhav Ashok Shivram	931	0.98%	New
BSP	Bhimrao Maruti Kamble	802	0.84%	New
Margin of victory		31,435	33.01%	▲25.39
Turnout		96,498	67.37%	▲2.91
Total valid votes		95,237		
Registered electors		143,227		▼0.57
SS hold		Swing	▲11.76	

=== Assembly Election 1990 ===
1990 Maharashtra Legislative Assembly election : Naigaon
Party	Candidate	Votes	%	±%
SS	Kolambkar Kalidas Nilkanth	44,415	48.49%	New
INC	Vilas Vishnu Sawant	37,437	40.87%	▲6.81
JD	Suresh Tukaram Tawde	8,379	9.15%	New
Margin of victory		6,978	7.62%	▼6.51
Turnout		92,573	64.26%	▲7.26
Total valid votes		91,589		
Registered electors		144,054		▲15.13
SS gain from INC		Swing	▲14.43	

=== Assembly Election 1985 ===
1985 Maharashtra Legislative Assembly election : Naigaon
Party	Candidate	Votes	%	±%
INC	Vilas Vishnu Sawant	24,005	34.06%	New
JP	Angre Vishnu	14,049	19.94%	▼10.79
Independent	Mohan Naik	12,700	18.02%	New
Independent	D. S. Kulkarni	8,474	12.02%	New
Independent	Sidharth Mainkar	5,818	8.26%	New
RPI	G. D. Ghokshe	3,337	4.74%	New
Independent	Ayanand B. Mohite	1,376	1.95%	New
Margin of victory		9,956	14.13%	▼8.35
Turnout		71,315	56.99%	▲11.87
Total valid votes		70,470		
Registered electors		125,128		▲2.79
INC gain from INC(I)		Swing	▼19.14	

=== Assembly Election 1980 ===
1980 Maharashtra Legislative Assembly election : Naigaon
Party	Candidate	Votes	%	±%
INC(I)	Ram Arjun Mahadik	28,784	53.20%	▲43.21
JP	N. K. Sawant	16,624	30.73%	▼13.62
INC(U)	Shridhar Bhagwan Tarkar	8,529	15.76%	New
Margin of victory		12,160	22.48%	▲2.03
Turnout		54,777	45.00%	▼24.23
Total valid votes		54,104		
Registered electors		121,733		▲5.84
INC(I) gain from JP		Swing	▲8.85	

=== Assembly Election 1978 ===
1978 Maharashtra Legislative Assembly election : Naigaon
Party	Candidate	Votes	%	±%
JP	N. K. Sawant	35,031	44.35%	New
SS	Vamanrao Mahadik	18,883	23.91%	▲10.51
INC	Vilas Sawant	14,659	18.56%	▼25.83
INC(I)	Kamble Bhau Ramachandra	7,891	9.99%	New
Independent	G. D. Ghokshe	2,526	3.20%	New
Margin of victory		16,148	20.44%	▲2.72
Turnout		80,149	69.68%	▼0.47
Total valid votes		78,990		
Registered electors		115,020		▲22.24
JP gain from INC		Swing	▼0.04	

=== Assembly Election 1972 ===
1972 Maharashtra Legislative Assembly election : Naigaon
Party	Candidate	Votes	%	±%
INC	Vilas Vishnu Sawant	28,880	44.39%	▲19.14
SSP	Ram Arjun Mahadik	17,352	26.67%	New
RPI(K)	Ambedkar Yashwant Bhimrao	9,149	14.06%	New
SS	Vijay Parvatkar	8,712	13.39%	New
INC(O)	Dudhnath Jaymangal Singh	963	1.48%	New
Margin of victory		11,528	17.72%	▲14.67
Turnout		66,581	70.76%	▲6.15
Total valid votes		65,056		
Registered electors		94,093		▲12.97
INC gain from PSP		Swing	▲15.52	

=== Assembly Election 1967 ===
1967 Maharashtra Legislative Assembly election : Naigaon
Party	Candidate	Votes	%	±%
PSP	Ram Arjun Mahadik	15,145	28.87%	New
RPI	Y. B. Ambedkar	13,547	25.82%	▼5.37
INC	S. C. Salve	13,245	25.25%	▼14.15
Independent	B. T. Barve	3,209	6.12%	New
ABJS	R. D. Kamble	3,112	5.93%	▼1.91
Independent	B. Mahadeshwar	1,710	3.26%	New
SWA	V. P. Fernandes	1,303	2.48%	New
Margin of victory		1,598	3.05%	▼5.16
Turnout		55,831	67.03%	▲8.27
Total valid votes		52,460		
Registered electors		83,289		▼13.39
PSP gain from INC		Swing	▼10.53	

=== Assembly Election 1962 ===
1962 Maharashtra Legislative Assembly election : Naigaon
Party	Candidate	Votes	%	±%
INC	Shakuntala Chintaman Salve	20,731	39.40%	New
RPI	Wamanrao Siraram Pagare	16,414	31.19%	New
Independent	Jagannath Ganpatrao Bhatankar	10,645	20.23%	New
ABJS	Niwruttinath Krishnaji Rupwate	4,129	7.85%	New
Independent	Gulab Trimbak Bhalerao	700	1.33%	New
Margin of victory		4,317	8.20%	
Turnout		54,267	56.43%	
Total valid votes		52,619		
Registered electors		96,171		
INC win (new seat)				
