= Santukrao Hambarde =

Indian politician

Personal details
- Party: Bharatiya Janata Party
- Other political affiliations: National Democratic Alliance
- Education: Marathwada University (MSc); Swami Ramanand Teerth Marathwada University (PhD)

Santukrao Marotrao Hambarde is an Indian politician.

== Education ==
Hambarde earned his MSc degree from Marathwada University in 1993 and his PhD from Swami Ramanand Teerth Marathwada University in 2008.

== Political career ==
Hambarde served as the deputy vice-chancellor of Swami Ramanand Teerth Marathwada University until he entered politics in 2014. He was a member of BJP for over ten years before contesting the Lok Sabha by-elections, which he lost by a very narrow margin of 1,458 votes.
