= Vithalrao Devidasrao Deshpande =

Indian politician

Vithalrao Devidasrao Deshpande was a leader of Communist Party of India. He was a member of Bombay Legislative Assembly and served as leader of opposition from 1959 to 1960.
