= Loha Assembly constituency =

Coordinates: 18.946°N 77.112°E

Loha
- Constituency No. 88 for the Maharashtra Legislative Assembly

Constituency details
- Country: India
- Region: Western India
- State: Maharashtra
- District: Nanded
- Lok Sabha constituency: Latur
- Established: 2008
- Total electors: 302,580
- Reservation: None

Member of Legislative Assembly
- 15th Maharashtra Legislative Assembly
- Incumbent Prataprao Govindrao Chikhalikar
- Party: NCP
- Alliance: NDA
- Elected year: 2024

Loha Assembly constituency is one of the 288 constituencies of the Maharashtra Legislative Assembly, in Maharashtra, India. The constituency is a part of Latur Lok Sabha constituency and comprises parts of Loha tehsil in Nanded district. It was established in 2008. As of 2019 it is represented by Shyamsundar Dagdoji Shinde of the Peasants and Workers Party of India.

== Geographical scope ==
The constituency comprises parts of Loha taluka, Revenue Circles of Malakoli Kalambar, Kapsi Budruk, Loha and Loha Municipal Council, parts of Kandhar taluka, Revenue Circles of Usman Nagar, Barul, Kandhar and Kandhar Municipal Council.

== Members of the Legislative Assembly ==
Year	Member	Party
Before 2009 : Constituency did not exist
2009	Shankaranna Dhondge	Nationalist Congress Party
2014	Prataprao Patil Chikhalikar	Shiv Sena
2019	Shyamsundar Shinde	Peasants and Workers Party
2024	Prataprao Patil Chikhalikar	Nationalist Congress Party

== Election results ==
=== Assembly Election 2024 ===
2024 Maharashtra Legislative Assembly election : Loha
Party	Candidate	Votes	%	±%
NCP	Prataprao Patil Chikhalikar	72,750	31.65	New
SS(UBT)	Eknathdada Pawar	61,777	26.87	New
JLP	Chandrasen Ishwarrao Patil	29,194	12.76	New
Independent	Prof. Manohar Babarao Dhonde	20,643	9.02	New
VBA	Shivkumar Narayanrao Narangale	20,302	8.87	▼10.61
PWPI	Ashabai Shyamsunder Shinde	19,786	8.65	▼44.46
NOTA	None of the Above	1,082	0.47	▼0.18
Margin of victory		10,973	4.78	▼28.82
Turnout		229,891	75.98	▲5.83
Total valid votes		228,809		
Registered electors		302,580		▲10.30
NCP gain from PWPI		Swing	▼21.31	

=== Assembly Election 2019 ===
2019 Maharashtra Legislative Assembly election : Loha
Party	Candidate	Votes	%	±%
PWPI	Shyamsundar Dagdoji Shinde	101,668	53.11	New
VBA	Shivkumar Narayanrao Narangale	37,306	19.49	New
SS	Dhondge Mukteshwar Keshavrao	30,965	16.17	▼31.35
NCP	Dilip Shankaranna Dhondge	14,517	7.58	▼7.48
Sambhaji Brigade Party	Subhash Bhagwan Kolhe	2,559	1.34	New
Independent	Pandurang Tolaba Wanne	1,700	0.89	New
NOTA	None of the Above	1,249	0.65	▼0.53
Margin of victory		64,362	33.62	▲10.23
Turnout		192,722	70.25	▼5.10
Total valid votes		191,446		
Registered electors		274,323		▲5.62
PWPI gain from SS		Swing	▲5.58	

=== Assembly Election 2014 ===
2014 Maharashtra Legislative Assembly election : Loha
Party	Candidate	Votes	%	±%
SS	Prataprao Patil Chikhalikar	92,435	47.52	▲43.42
BJP	Dhondge Mukteshwar Keshavrao	46,949	24.14	New
NCP	Shankaranna Dhondge	29,294	15.06	▼32.11
MNS	Chavan Rohidas Khobraji	6,568	3.38	▲2.36
INC	Shyam Bapurao Telang	5,312	2.73	New
Independent	Prof. Dhonde Manohar Babarao	4,878	2.51	New
BSP	Satwa Arjun Sonkamble	3,488	1.79	▲0.81
NOTA	None of the Above	2,295	1.18	New
Margin of victory		45,486	23.39	▲17.97
Turnout		196,822	75.78	▼3.75
Total valid votes		194,505		
Registered electors		259,734		▲18.14
SS gain from NCP		Swing	▲0.36	

=== Assembly Election 2009 ===
2009 Maharashtra Legislative Assembly election : Loha
Party	Candidate	Votes	%	±%
NCP	Dhondge Shankarrao Ganeshrao	81,539	47.17	New
Lok Bharati	Chikhalikar Prataprao Govindrao	72,175	41.75	New
SS	Dhonde Manohar Babarao	7,087	4.10	New
Independent	Umrekar Shahaji Sambhaji	1,999	1.16	New
Independent	Kamble Roopkumar Narayanrao	1,807	1.05	New
MNS	Narangale Shivkumar Narayanrao	1,765	1.02	New
BSP	Gaikwad Narendra Babarao	1,696	0.98	New
Margin of victory		9,364	5.42	
Turnout		172,888	78.64	
Total valid votes		172,877		
Registered electors		219,852		
NCP win (new seat)				
