= 2009 Indian general election in Maharashtra =

Indian general election in Maharashtra, 2009
- 16 April 23 April, 30 April

48 seats
- Turnout: 50.73%
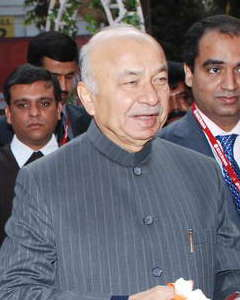

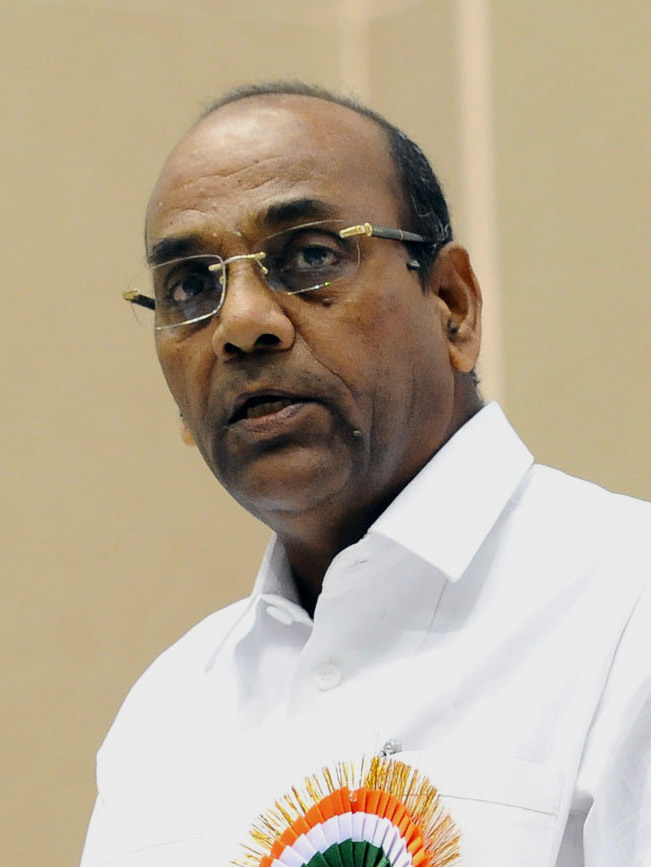

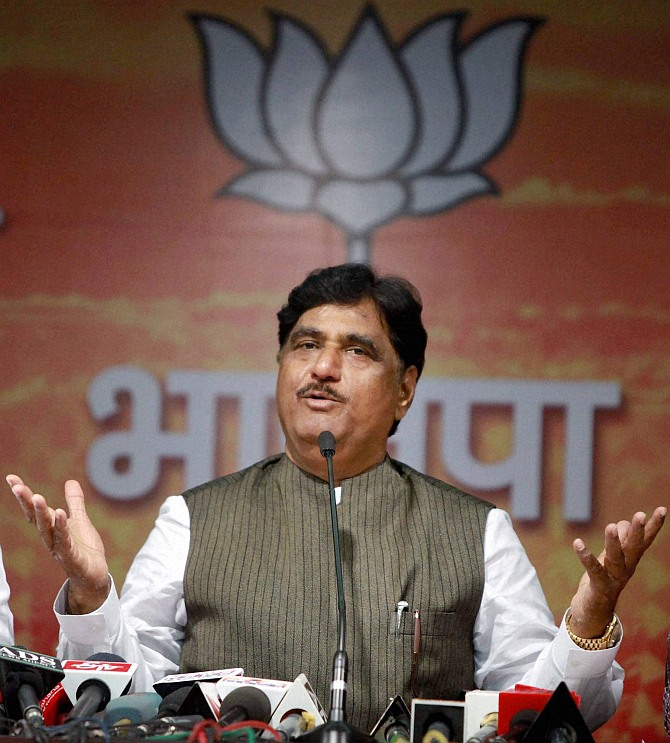

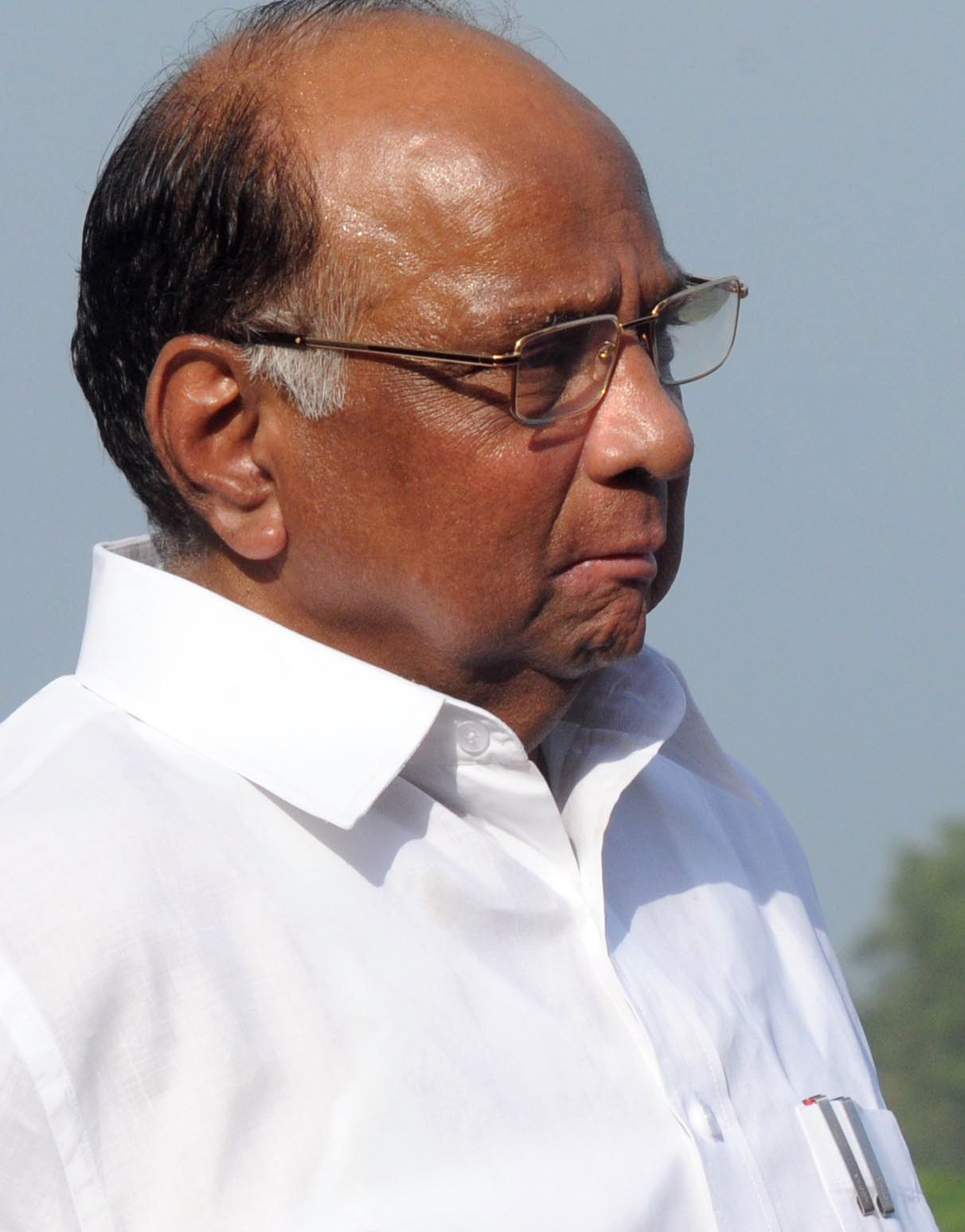
	First party	Second party	Third party
Leader	Sushilkumar Shinde	Anant Geete	Gopinath Munde
Party	INC	SS	BJP
Alliance	UPA	NDA	NDA
Last election	23.77% 13 seats	20.11%12 seats	22.61% 13 seats
Seats won	17	11	9
Seat change	▲4	▼1	▼4
Popular vote	72,53,634	62,87,964	67,21,644
Percentage	19.61%	17%	18.17%
Swing	▼4.16 pp	▼3.11 pp	▼4.44 pp
	Fourth party	Fifth party	Sixth party
		SWP	BVA
Leader	Sharad Pawar	Raju Shetti	Baliram Sukur Jadhav
Party	NCP	SWP	BVA
Alliance	UPA	UPA	UPA
Last election	18.31% 9 seats	New	New
Seats won	8	1	1
Seat change	▼1	▲1	▲1
Popular vote	71,31,175	4,81,025	2,23,234
Percentage	19.28%	1.3%	0.60%
Swing	▲0.97 pp	▲1.3 pp	▲0.60 pp
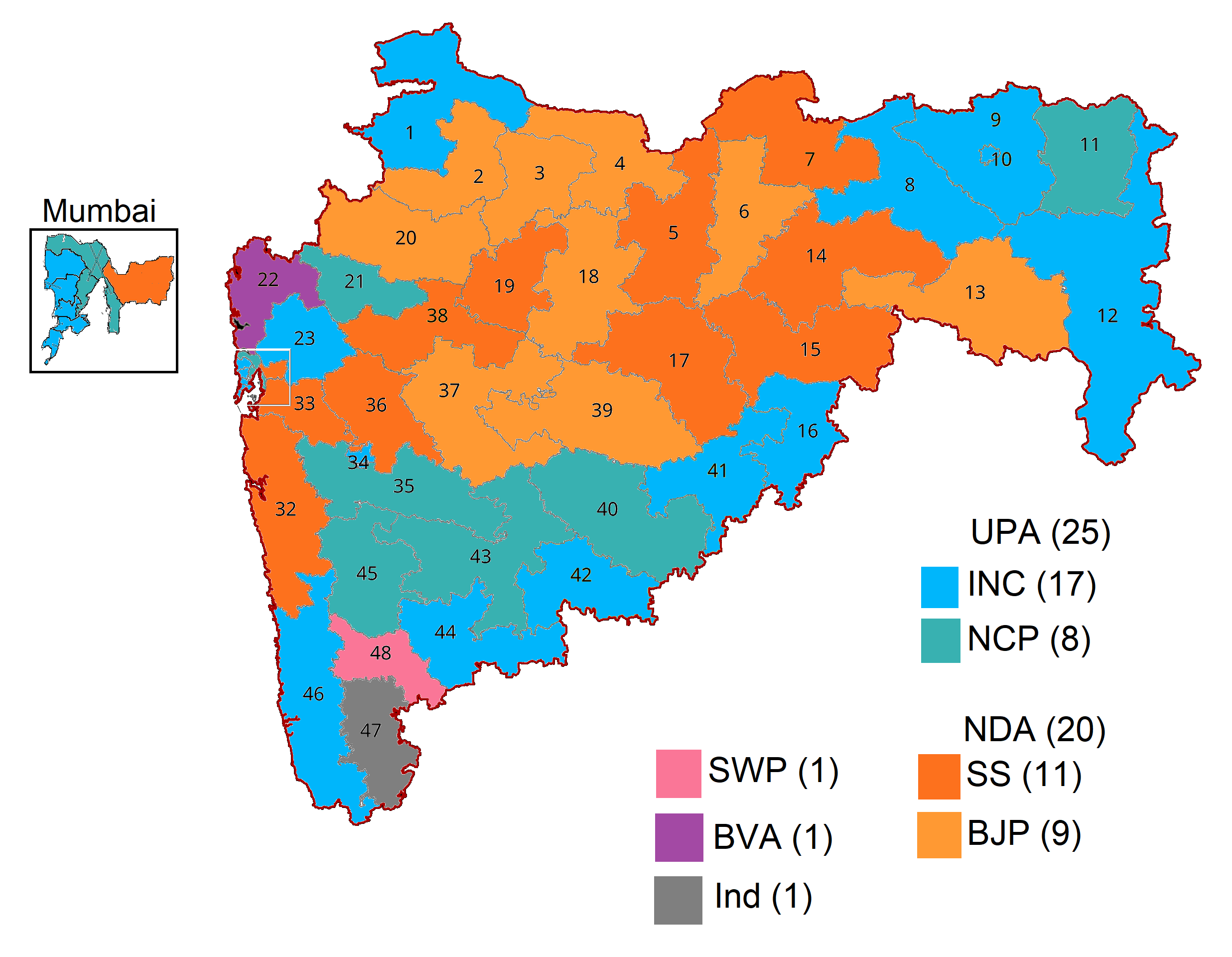
- Maharashtra 2009 Lok Sabha Results

- Alliance wise structure
Prime Minister before election
Manmohan Singh
INC
Prime Minister after election
Manmohan Singh
INC

The Indian general election, 2009 in Maharashtra were held for 48 seats with the state going to polls in the first three phases of the general elections. The major contenders in the state were the United Progressive Alliance (UPA) and National Democratic Alliance (NDA). UPA consisted of the Indian National Congress and the Nationalist Congress Party whereas the NDA consisted of the Bharatiya Janata Party and the Shiv Sena. The Shiv Sena contested on 22 seats in the state and the BJP over 25 seats . Similarly, the NCP contested on 21 seats and the Indian National Congress contested on 25 seats . Other parties in the fray included the Maharashtra Navnirman Sena (MNS), Bahujan Samaj Party which fielded candidates on 47 seats, and the Fourth Front. The MNS which was contesting its first general elections fielded candidates on 11 seats in the state.

== Parties and alliances ==
=== National Democratic Alliance ===
Party	Flag	Symbol	Leader	Seats contested
Bharatiya Janata Party			Gopinath Munde	25
Shiv Sena			Anant Geete	22
Independent			Ajitrao Shankarrao Ghorpade	1
Total				48

=== United Progressive Alliance ===
Party	Flag	Symbol	Leader	Seats contested
Indian National Congress			Sushilkumar Shinde	25
Nationalist Congress Party			Sharad Pawar	21
Republican Party of India (Athawale)			Ramdas Athawale	1
Republican Party of India			Gawai Rajendra Ramkrushna	1
Total				48

== List of Candidates ==
Constituency		UPA		NDA	
#	Name	Party	Candidate	Party	Candidate
1	Nandurbar (ST)	INC	Manikrao Gavit	BJP	Suhas Natawadkar
2	Dhule	INC	Amrish Patel	BJP	Pratap Sonawane
3	Jalgaon	NCP	Vasantrao More	BJP	A. T. Patil
4	Raver	NCP	Bhaiyyasaheb R. Patil	BJP	Haribhau Jawale
5	Buldhana	NCP	Rajendra Shingne	SS	Prataprao Jadhav
6	Akola	INC	Babasaheb Dhabekar	BJP	Sanjay Dhotre
7	Amravati (SC)	RPI(G)	Rajendra Gavai	SS	Anandrao Adsul
8	Wardha	INC	Datta Meghe	BJP	Suresh Wagmare
9	Ramtek (SC)	INC	Mukul Wasnik	SS	Krupal Tumane
10	Nagpur	INC	Vilas Muttemwar	BJP	Banwarilal Purohit
11	Bhandara-Gondiya	NCP	Praful Patel	BJP	Shishupal Patle
12	Gadchiroli-Chimur (ST)	INC	Marotrao Kowase	BJP	Ashok Nete
13	Chandrapur	INC	Nareshkumar Puglia	BJP	Hansraj Gangaram Ahir
14	Yavatmal-Washim	INC	Harising Rathod	SS	Bhavana Gawali
15	Hingoli	NCP	Suryakanta Patil	SS	Subhash Wankhede
16	Nanded	INC	Bhaskarrao Patil	BJP	Sambhaji Pawar
17	Parbhani	NCP	Suresh Warpudkar	SS	Ganeshrao Dudhgaonkar
18	Jalna	INC	Kalyan Kale	BJP	Raosaheb Danve
19	Aurangabad	INC	Uttamsingh Pawar	SS	Chandrakant Khaire
20	Dindori (ST)	NCP	Narhari Sitaram Zirwal	BJP	Harischandra Chavan
21	Nashik	NCP	Sameer Bhujbal	SS	Datta Gaikwad
22	Palghar (ST)	INC	Damodar Shingada	BJP	Chintaman Vanaga
23	Bhiwandi	INC	Suresh Taware	BJP	Jagannath Patil
24	Kalyan	NCP	Vasant Davkhare	SS	Anand Paranjpe
25	Thane	NCP	Sanjeev Naik	BJP	Vijay Chougule
26	Mumbai North	INC	Sanjay Nirupam	BJP	Ram Naik
27	Mumbai North West	INC	Gurudas Kamat	SS	Gajanan Kirtikar
28	Mumbai North East	NCP	Sanjay Dina Patil	BJP	Kirit Somaiya
29	Mumbai North Central	INC	Priya Dutt	BJP	Mahesh Jethmalani
30	Mumbai South Central	INC	Eknath Gaikwad	SS	Suresh Anant Gambhir
31	Mumbai South	INC	Milind Murli Deora	SS	Mohan Rawale
32	Raigad	INC	A. R. Antulay	SS	Anant Geete
33	Maval	NCP	Azam Pansare	SS	Gajanan Babar
34	Pune	INC	Suresh Kalmadi	BJP	Anil Shirole
35	Baramati	NCP	Supriya Sule	BJP	Kanta Nalawade
36	Shirur	NCP	Vilas Vithoba Lande	SS	Shivajirao Adhalarao Patil
37	Ahmednagar	NCP	Shivaji Kardile	BJP	Dilipkumar Gandhi
38	Shirdi (SC)	RPI(A)	Ramdas Athawale	SS	Bhausaheb Wakchaure
39	Beed	NCP	Rameshrao Baburao Kokate	BJP	Gopinath Munde
40	Osmanabad	NCP	Padamsinh Patil	SS	Ravindra Gaikwad
41	Latur (SC)	INC	Jaywantrao Awale	BJP	Sunil Gaikwad
42	Solapur (SC)	INC	Sushilkumar Shinde	BJP	Sharad Bansode
43	Madha	NCP	Sharad Pawar	BJP	Subhash Deshmukh
44	Sangli	INC	Pratik Patil	IND	Ajitrao S. Ghorpade
45	Satara	NCP	Udayanraje Bhonsle	SS	Purushottam B. Jadhav
46	Ratnagiri-Sindhudurg	INC	Nilesh Narayan Rane	SS	Suresh Prabhu
47	Kolhapur	NCP	Sambhaji Raje	SS	Vijay Devane
48	Hatkanangle	NCP	Nivedita Mane	SS	Raghunath Patil

== Voting and results ==
Source: Election Commission of India

=== Results by Alliance ===
Alliance/ Party		Popular vote			Seats		
Alliance/ Party		Votes	%	±pp	Contested	Won	+/−
UPA	INC	72,53,634	19.61	▼4.16	25	17	▲4
UPA	NCP	71,31,175	19.28	▲0.97	21	8	▼1
UPA	RPI	2,52,570	0.68	▲0.24	1	0	Steady
UPA	RPI(A)	2,27,170	0.61	▼0.40	1	0	▼1
UPA	Total	1,48,64,549	40.18	▼4.66	48	25	▲3
NDA	SHS	62,87,964	17.00	▼3.11	22	11	▼1
NDA	BJP	67,21,644	18.71	▼3.90	25	9	▼4
NDA	IND	3,38,837	0.92	Steady	1	0	Steady
NDA	Total	1,33,48,445	36.09	▼6.63	48	20	▼5
SWP		4,81,025	1.30	Steady	1	1	▲1
BVA		2,23,234	0.60	Steady	1	1	▲1
BSP		17,85,643	4.83	Steady	47	0	
MNS		15,03,863	4.07	New entry	11	0	Steady
BBM		4,92,470	1.33	Steady	39	0	Steady
SP		3,71,209	1.00	Steady	10	0	Steady
CPI(M)		1,97,576	0.53	Steady	2	0	Steady
SBP		1,88,608	0.51	Steady	4	0	Steady
Others		8,90,398	2.41	Steady	199	0	Steady
IND		29,83,128	8.06	▲4.17	410	1	▲1
Total		3,69,91,311	100%	-	819	48	-

Party	Seats Retained	Seats Lost	Seats Gained	Seats Won
Indian National Congress	08	▼05	▲09	17
Nationalist Congress Party	03	▼06	▲05	08
Shiv Sena	06	▼06	▲05	11
Bharatiya Janata Party	04	▼09	▲05	09

=== Result of Prominent Parties ===
Party	Leader	MPs			Votes	
Party	Leader		Of total			Of total
Indian National Congress	Sushilkumar Shinde	17	26	17 / 48 (35%)	1,23,87,322	33.4%
Shiv Sena	Anant Geete	11	22	11 / 48 (23%)	82,50,038	22.4%
Bharatiya Janata Party	Gopinath Munde	09	26	09 / 48 (19%)	70,25,884	19.08%
Nationalist Congress Party	Sharad Pawar	08	22	08 / 48 (17%)	65,00,800	17.6%

=== List of Elected MPs ===
Constituency		Winner				Runner Up				Margin	%
#	Name	Candidate	Party	Votes	%	Candidate	Party	Votes	%	Margin	%
1	Nandurbar (ST)	Manikrao Gavit	INC	2,75,936	36.01	Sharad Gavit	SP	2,35,093	30.68	40,843	5.33
2	Dhule	Pratap Sonawane	BJP	2,63,260	39.30	Amrish Patel	INC	2,43,841	36.40	19,419	2.90
3	Jalgaon	A. T. Patil	BJP	3,43,647	52.34	Vasantrao More	NCP	2,47,627	37.72	96,020	14.62
4	Raver	Haribhau Jawale	BJP	3,28,843	45.67	Ravindra Patil	NCP	3,00,625	41.75	28,218	3.92
5	Buldhana	Prataprao Jadhav	SS	3,53,671	41.46	Rajendra Shingne	NCP	3,25,593	38.16	28,078	3.30
6	Akola	Sanjay Dhotre	BJP	2,87,526	38.91	Prakash Ambedkar	BBM	2,22,678	30.13	64,848	8.78
7	Amravati (SC)	Anandrao Adsul	SS	3,14,286	42.91	Rajendra Gavai	RPI	2,52,570	34.48	61,716	8.43
8	Wardha	Datta Meghe	INC	3,52,853	45.88	Suresh Wagmare	BJP	2,56,935	33.41	95,918	12.47
9	Ramtek (SC)	Mukul Wasnik	INC	3,11,614	40.75	Krupal Tumane	SS	2,94,913	38.57	16,701	2.18
10	Nagpur	Vilas Muttemwar	INC	3,15,148	41.72	Banwarilal Purohit	BJP	2,90,749	38.49	24,399	3.23
11	Bhandara–Gondiya	Praful Patel	NCP	4,89,814	47.52	Nana Patole	IND	2,37,899	23.08	2,51,915	24.44
12	Gadchiroli-Chimur (ST)	Marotrao Kowase	INC	3,21,756	38.43	Ashok Nete	BJP	2,93,176	35.02	28,580	3.41
13	Chandrapur	Hansraj Gangaram Ahir	BJP	3,01,467	33.55	Naresh Puglia	INC	2,68,972	29.94	32,495	3.61
14	Yavatmal-Washim	Bhavana Gawali	SS	3,84,443	45.76	Harising Rathod	INC	3,27,492	38.98	56,951	6.78
15	Hingoli	Subhash Wankhede	SS	3,40,148	41.61	Suryakanta Patil	NCP	2,66,514	32.60	73,634	9.01
16	Nanded	Bhaskarrao Patil	INC	3,46,400	44.72	Sambhaji Pawar	BJP	2,71,786	35.09	74,614	9.63
17	Parbhani	Ganeshrao Dudhgaonkar	SS	3,85,387	44.26	Suresh Warpudkar	NCP	3,19,969	36.75	65,418	7.51
18	Jalna	Raosaheb Danve	BJP	3,50,710	44.00	Kalyan Kale	INC	3,42,228	42.93	8,482	1.07
19	Aurangabad	Chandrakant Khaire	SS	2,55,896	35.00	Uttamsingh Pawar	INC	2,22,882	30.48	33,014	4.52
20	Dindori (ST)	Harischandra Chavan	BJP	2,81,254	41.26	Narhari Zirwal	NCP	2,43,907	35.78	37,347	5.48
21	Nashik	Sameer Bhujbal	NCP	2,38,706	36.34	Hemant Godse	MNS	2,16,674	32.98	22,032	3.36
22	Palghar (ST)	Baliram Jadhav	BVA	2,23,234	30.47	Chintaman Vanaga	BJP	2,10,874	28.78	12,360	1.69
23	Bhiwandi	Suresh Taware	INC	1,82,789	31.29	Jagannath Patil	BJP	1,41,425	24.21	41,364	7.08
24	Kalyan	Anand Paranjpe	SS	2,12,476	39.00	Vasant Davkhare	NCP	1,88,274	34.56	24,202	4.44
25	Thane	Sanjeev Naik	NCP	3,01,000	40.14	Vijay Chougule	SS	2,51,980	33.60	49,020	6.54
26	Mumbai North	Sanjay Nirupam	INC	2,55,157	37.25	Ram Naik	BJP	2,49,378	36.40	5,779	0.85
27	Mumbai North West	Gurudas Kamat	INC	2,53,920	35.91	Gajanan Kirtikar	SS	2,15,533	30.48	38,387	5.43
28	Mumbai North East	Sanjay Dina Patil	NCP	2,13,505	31.97	Kirit Somaiya	BJP	2,10,572	31.53	2,933	0.44
29	Mumbai North Central	Priya Dutt	INC	3,19,352	48.05	Mahesh Jethmalani	BJP	1,44,797	21.79	1,74,555	26.26
30	Mumbai South Central	Eknath Gaikwad	INC	2,57,523	43.00	Suresh Anant Gambhir	SS	1,81,817	30.36	75,706	12.64
31	Mumbai South	Milind Murli Deora	INC	2,72,411	42.46	Bala Nandgaonkar	MNS	1,59,729	24.90	1,12,682	17.56
32	Raigad	Anant Geete	SS	4,13,546	53.89	A. R. Antulay	INC	2,67,025	34.80	1,46,521	19.09
33	Maval	Gajanan Babar	SS	3,64,857	50.84	Azam Pansare	NCP	2,84,238	39.61	80,619	11.23
34	Pune	Suresh Kalmadi	INC	2,79,973	38.11	Anil Shirole	BJP	2,54,272	34.61	25,701	3.50
35	Baramati	Supriya Sule	NCP	4,87,827	66.46	Kanta Nalawade	BJP	1,50,996	20.57	3,36,831	45.89
36	Shirur	Shivajirao Patil	SS	4,82,563	57.54	Vilas Vithoba Lande	NCP	3,03,952	36.24	1,78,611	21.30
37	Ahmadnagar	Dilipkumar Gandhi	BJP	3,12,047	39.65	Shivaji Kardile	NCP	2,65,316	33.71	46,731	5.94
38	Shirdi (SC)	Bhausaheb Wakchaure	SS	3,59,921	54.21	Ramdas Athawale	RPA	2,27,170	34.22	1,32,751	19.99
39	Beed	Gopinath Munde	BJP	5,53,994	51.58	Rameshrao Kokate	NCP	4,13,042	38.46	1,40,952	13.12
40	Osmanabad	Padamsinh Patil	NCP	4,08,840	44.22	Ravindra Gaikwad	SS	4,02,053	43.49	6,787	0.73
41	Latur (SC)	Jaywantrao Awale	INC	3,72,890	44.96	Sunil Gaikwad	BJP	3,64,915	44.00	7,975	0.96
42	Solapur (SC)	Sushilkumar Shinde	INC	3,87,591	52.15	Sharad Bansode	BJP	2,87,959	38.74	99,632	13.41
43	Madha	Sharad Pawar	NCP	5,30,596	57.71	Subhash Deshmukh	BJP	2,16,137	23.51	3,14,459	34.20
44	Sangli	Pratik Patil	INC	3,78,620	48.74	Ajitrao Ghorpade	IND	3,38,837	43.62	39,783	5.12
45	Satara	Udayanraje Bhosale	NCP	5,32,583	65.22	Purushottam Jadhav	SS	2,35,068	28.78	2,97,515	36.44
46	Ratnagiri - Sindhudurg	Nilesh Rane	INC	3,53,915	49.24	Suresh Prabhu	SS	3,07,165	42.74	46,750	6.50
47	Kolhapur	Sadashivrao Mandlik	IND	4,28,082	41.65	Sambhaji Raje	NCP	3,83,282	37.29	44,800	4.36
48	Hatkanangle	Raju Shetti	SWP	4,81,025	49.17	Nivedita Mane	NCP	3,85,965	39.46	95,060	9.71

== Region–wise breakup ==
Region	Total seats	Indian National Congress			Shiv Sena			Bharatiya Janata Party			Nationalist Congress Party			Others
Region	Total seats	Votes Polled	Seats Won		Votes Polled	Seats Won		Votes Polled	Seats Won		Votes Polled	Seats Won		Others
Western Maharashtra	11	22,56,578	03	Steady	15,03,698	02	▲01	7,87,153	01	Steady	24,70,200	03	▼03	02
Vidarbha	10	31,28,402	04	▲03	24,27,032	03	▼01	16,38,523	02	▼04	10,30,995	01	▲01	00
Marathwada	8	16,04,435	02	▲02	22,86,673	03	▲01	14,78,842	02	▼01	9,24,810	01	▼01	00
Thane+Konkan	6	13,04,035	02	Steady	20,32,635	02	▼01	00	00	Steady	7,49,910	01	▲01	01
Mumbai	6	32,97,464	05	▲01	00	00	▼01	00	00	Steady	6,67,955	01	▲01	00
North Maharashtra	6	7,66,408	01	▼01	00	00	Steady	20,47,314	04	▲01	6,56,930	01	Steady	00
Total	48	1,23,57,322	17	▲04	82,50,038	11	▼01	59,51,832	09	▼04	65,00,800	08	▼01	03

=== Western Maharashtra ===
Sr.no	Seats	Elected Candidate	Party
1.	Pune	Suresh Kalmadi	Indian National Congress
2.	Solapur (SC)	Sushilkumar Sambhajirao Shinde	Indian National Congress
3.	Sangli	Pratik Prakashbapu Patil	Indian National Congress
4.	Baramati	Supriya Sule	Nationalist Congress Party
5.	Madha	Sharadchandra Govindrao Pawar	Nationalist Congress Party
6.	Satara	Udayanraje Bhonsle	Nationalist Congress Party
7.	Maval	Gajanan Dharmshi Babar	Shiv Sena
8.	Shirur	Shivajirao Adhalarao Patil	Shiv Sena
9.	Ahmednagar	Dilipkumar Mansukhlal Gandhi	Bharatiya Janata Party
10.	Kolhapur	Sadashivrao Dadoba Mandlik	Independent
11.	Hatkanangle	Raju Shetti	Swabhimani Paksha

=== Vidarbha ===
Sr.no	Seats	Elected Candidate	Party
1.	Wardha	Datta Meghe	Indian National Congress
2.	Ramtek (SC)	Mukul Balkrishna Wasnik	Indian National Congress
3.	Nagpur	Vilasrao Baburaoji Muttemwar	Indian National Congress
4.	Gadchiroli-Chimur (ST)	Marotrao Sainuji Kowase	Indian National Congress
5.	Bhandara-Gondiya	Praful Manoharbhai Patel	Nationalist Congress Party
6.	Buldhana	Prataprao Ganpatrao Jadhav	Shiv Sena
7.	Amravati (SC)	Anandrao Vithoba Adsul	Shiv Sena
8.	Yavatmal-Washim	Bhavana Pundlikrao Gawali	Shiv Sena
9.	Akola	Sanjay Shamrao Dhotre	Bharatiya Janata Party
10.	Chandrapur	Hansraj Gangaram Ahir	Bharatiya Janata Party

=== Marathwada ===
Sr.no	Seats	Elected Candidate	Party
1.	Nanded	Bhaskarrao Bapurao Khatgaonkar Patil	Indian National Congress
2.	Latur (SC)	Awale Jaywant Gangaram	Indian National Congress
3.	Osmanabad	Padamsinha Bajirao Patil	Nationalist Congress Party
4.	Hingoli	Subhash Bapurao Wankhede	Shiv Sena
5.	Parbhani	Ganeshrao Nagorao Dudhgaonkar	Shiv Sena
6.	Aurangabad	Chandrakant Khaire	Shiv Sena
7.	Jalna	Raosaheb Dadarao Danve	Bharatiya Janata Party
8.	Beed	Gopinathrao Pandurang Munde	Bharatiya Janata Party

=== Thane+Konkan ===
Sr.no	Seats	Elected Candidate	Party
1.	Bhiwandi	Suresh Kashinath Taware	Indian National Congress
2.	Ratnagiri-Sindhudurg	Nilesh Narayan Rane	Indian National Congress
3.	Thane	Sanjeev Ganesh Naik	Nationalist Congress Party
4.	Kalyan	Anand Prakash Paranjape	Shiv Sena
5.	Raigad	Anant Geete	Shiv Sena
6.	Palghar (ST)	Baliram Sukur Jadhav	Bahujan Vikas Aghadi

=== Mumbai ===
Sr.no	Seats	Elected Candidate	Party
1.	Mumbai North	Sanjay Brijkishorlal Nirupam	Indian National Congress
2.	Mumbai North West	Gurudas Kamat	Indian National Congress
3.	Mumbai North East	Sanjay Dina Patil	Nationalist Congress Party
4.	Mumbai North Central	Priya Sunil Dutt	Indian National Congress
5.	Mumbai South Central	Eknath Gaikwad	Indian National Congress
6.	Mumbai South	Milind Murli Deora	Indian National Congress

=== North Maharashtra ===
Sr.no	Seats	Elected Candidate	Party
1.	Nandurbar (ST)	Gavit Manikrao Hodlya	Indian National Congress
2.	Dhule	Pratap Narayanrao Sonawane	Bharatiya Janata Party
3.	Jalgaon	A. T. Patil	Bharatiya Janata Party
4.	Raver	Haribhau Madhav Jawale	Bharatiya Janata Party
5.	Nashik	Sameer Bhujbal	Nationalist Congress Party
6.	Dindori (ST)	Harishchandra Chavan	Bharatiya Janata Party

== Post-election Union Council of Ministers from Maharashtra ==
#	Name	Constituency	Designation	Department	From	To	Party
1	Sharad Pawar	Madha	Cabinet Minister	Agriculture	23 May 2009	26 May 2014	NCP
1	Sharad Pawar	Madha	Cabinet Minister	Consumer Affairs; Food and Public Distribution	23 May 2009	19 January 2011	NCP
1	Sharad Pawar	Madha	Cabinet Minister	Food Processing Industries	19 January 2011	26 May 2014	NCP
2	Sushilkumar Shinde	Solapur	Cabinet Minister	Power	28 May 2009	31 July 2012	INC
2	Sushilkumar Shinde	Solapur	Cabinet Minister	Home Affairs	31 July 2012	26 May 2014	INC
3	Vilasrao Deshmukh	Rajya Sabha (Maharashtra)	Cabinet Minister	Heavy Industries; Public Enterprises	28 May 2009	19 January 2011	INC
3	Vilasrao Deshmukh	Rajya Sabha (Maharashtra)	Cabinet Minister	Rural Development; Panchayati Raj	19 January 2011	12 July 2011	INC
3	Vilasrao Deshmukh	Rajya Sabha (Maharashtra)	Cabinet Minister	Science and Technology; Earth Sciences	12 July 2011	10 August 2012	INC
3	Vilasrao Deshmukh	Rajya Sabha (Maharashtra)	Cabinet Minister	Micro, Small; Medium Enterprises	26 June 2012	10 August 2012	INC
3	Vilasrao Deshmukh	Rajya Sabha (Maharashtra)	Cabinet Minister	Minister without portfolio	10 August 2012	14 August 2012	INC
4	Murli Deora	Rajya Sabha (Maharashtra)	Cabinet Minister	Petroleum and Natural Gas	28 May 2009	19 January 2011	INC
4	Murli Deora	Rajya Sabha (Maharashtra)	Cabinet Minister	Corporate Affairs	19 January 2011	12 July 2011	INC
5	Praful Patel	Bhandara – Gondiya	MoS (I/C)	Civil Aviation	28 May 2009	19 January 2011	NCP
5	Praful Patel	Bhandara – Gondiya	Cabinet Minister	Heavy Industries; Public Enterprises	19 January 2011	26 May 2014	NCP
6	Mukul Wasnik	Ramtek	Cabinet Minister	Social Justice and Empowerment	28 May 2009	27 October 2012	INC
7	Prithviraj Chavan	Rajya Sabha (Maharashtra)	MoS (I/C)	Science and Technology; Earth Sciences	28 May 2009	10 November 2010	INC
7	Prithviraj Chavan	Rajya Sabha (Maharashtra)	MoS	Prime Minister's Office	28 May 2009	10 November 2010	INC
7	Prithviraj Chavan	Rajya Sabha (Maharashtra)	MoS	Personnel; Public Grievances and Pensions	28 May 2009	10 November 2010	INC
7	Prithviraj Chavan	Rajya Sabha (Maharashtra)	MoS	Parliamentary Affairs	28 May 2009	10 November 2010	INC
8	Gurudas Kamat	Mumbai North West	MoS	Communications; Information Technology	28 May 2009	19 January 2011	INC
8	Gurudas Kamat	Mumbai North West	MoS	Home Affairs	19 January 2011	12 July 2011	INC
8	Gurudas Kamat	Mumbai North West	MoS	Communications; Information Technology	21 January 2011	12 July 2011	INC
8	Gurudas Kamat	Mumbai North West	MoS (I/C)	Drinking Water; Sanitation	12 July 2011	13 July 2011	INC
9	Pratik Prakashbapu Patil	Sangli	MoS	Heavy Industries; Public Enterprises	28 May 2009	14 June 2009	INC
9	Pratik Prakashbapu Patil	Sangli	MoS	Youth Affairs and Sports	14 June 2009	19 January 2011	INC
9	Pratik Prakashbapu Patil	Sangli	MoS	Coal	19 January 2011	26 May 2014	INC
10	Milind Deora	Mumbai South	MoS	Communications; Information Technology	12 July 2011	26 May 2014	INC
10	Milind Deora	Mumbai South	MoS	Shipping	30 October 2012	26 May 2014	INC
11	Rajeev Shukla	Rajya Sabha (Maharashtra)	MoS	Parliamentary Affairs	12 July 2011	26 May 2014	INC
11	Rajeev Shukla	Rajya Sabha (Maharashtra)	MoS	Planning	28 October 2012	26 May 2014	INC
12	Tariq Anwar	Rajya Sabha (Maharashtra)	MoS	Agriculture	28 October 2012	26 May 2014	NCP
12	Tariq Anwar	Rajya Sabha (Maharashtra)	MoS	Food Processing Industries	28 October 2012	26 May 2014	NCP
13	Manikrao Hodlya Gavit	Nandurbar	MoS	Social Justice and Empowerment	17 June 2013	26 May 2014	INC

== Assembly segments wise lead of Parties ==
Party	Assembly segments	Position in Assembly (as of 2009 election)
Indian National Congress	79	82
Bharatiya Janata Party	61	46
Shiv Sena	61	44
Nationalist Congress Party	52	62
Maharashtra Navnirman Sena	8	13
Swabhimani Paksha	4	1
Bahujan Vikas Aghadi	3	2
Bharipa Bahujan Mahasangh	2	1
Communist Party of India (Marxist)	2	1
Lok Sangram	1	1
Janata Dal (Secular)	1	0
Republican Party of India	1	0
Others	13	35
Total	288	
