= Rupatai Patil Nilangekar =

Indian politician

Rupatai Diliprao Patil Nilangekar

Member of Parliament, Lok Sabha
- In office 2004–2009
- Prime Minister: Manmohan Singh
- Preceded by: Shivraj Patil
- Succeeded by: Jaywant Gangaram Awale
- Constituency: Latur

Personal details
- Born: 4 June 1957 (age 68) Ghatboral, Humnabad taluka, Bidar district, Mysuru State, (present-day Karnataka) India
- Citizenship: India
- Party: BJP
- Spouse: Late.Diliprao S. Patil
- Relations: Shivajirao Patil Nilangekar (Father-In-Law)
- Children: 2 sons and 1 daughter including Sambhaji Patil Nilangekar
- Occupation: Politician
- As of 16 September, 2006

Rupatai Diliprao Patil Nilangekar (born 4 June 1957) is an Indian politician who served as the Member of the Lok Sabha representing the Latur constituency, from 2004 to 2009. She is a member of the Bharatiya Janata Party (BJP) political party.

She is the daughter-in-law of former Chief Minister of Maharashtra, Shivajirao Patil Nilangekar. Her son Sambhaji Patil Nilangekar was appointed minister in Devendra Fadnavis' BJP Government in Maharashtra in 2016.

Preceded by Shivraj Patil	14th Lok Sabha; 2004–2009	Succeeded by Jaywantrao Awale
