= Latur Lok Sabha constituency =

Lok Sabha constituency in Maharashtra

Coordinates: 18.4°N 76.6°E

Latur
- Lok Sabha constituency
- Latur Lok Sabha Constituency map

Constituency details
- Country: India
- Region: Western India
- State: Maharashtra
- District: Latur and Nanded
- Assembly constituencies: Loha; Latur Rural; Latur City; Ahmedpur; Udgir; Nilanga
- Established: 1952
- Total electors: 11,78,089
- Reservation: SC

Member of Parliament
- 18th Lok Sabha
- Incumbent Shivajirao Kalge
- Party: Indian National Congress
- Elected year: 2024
- Preceded by: Sudhakar Tukaram Shrangare

Latur Lok Sabha constituency is one of the 48 Lok Sabha (parliamentary) constituencies of Maharashtra state in western India.

== Assembly segments ==
Presently, after the implementation of delimitation of the parliamentary constituencies in 2008, Latur Lok Sabha constituency comprises the following six Vidhan Sabha (Legislative Assembly) segments:

No	Name	District	Member	Party	Leading (in 2024)
88	Loha	Nanded	Prataprao Patil Chikhalikar	NCP	INC
234	Latur Rural	Latur	Ramesh Karad	BJP	INC
235	Latur City	Latur	Amit Deshmukh	INC	INC
236	Ahmedpur	Latur	Babasaheb Jadhav Patil	NCP	BJP
237	Udgir (SC)	Latur	Sanjay Bansode	NCP	BJP
238	Nilanga	Latur	Sambhaji Patil Nilangekar	BJP	INC

== Members of Parliament ==
Year	Name	Party
1952-61 : Constituency does not exist
1962	Tulsiram Kamble	Indian National Congress
1967	Tulsiram Kamble	Indian National Congress
1971	Tulsiram Kamble	Indian National Congress
1977	Udhavrao Patil	Peasants and Workers Party of India
1980	Shivraj Patil	Indian National Congress
1984	Shivraj Patil	Indian National Congress
1989	Shivraj Patil	Indian National Congress
1991	Shivraj Patil	Indian National Congress
1996	Shivraj Patil	Indian National Congress
1998	Shivraj Patil	Indian National Congress
1999	Shivraj Patil	Indian National Congress
2004	Rupatai Patil Nilangekar	Bharatiya Janata Party
2009	Jaywantrao Awale	Indian National Congress
2014	Sunil Gaikwad	Bharatiya Janata Party
2019	Sudhakar Shrangare	Bharatiya Janata Party
2024	Shivaji Kalge	Indian National Congress

== Election results ==
=== 2024 ===
2024 Indian general election: Latur
Party	Candidate	Votes	%	±%
INC	Dr. Kalge Shivaji Bandappa	609,021	49.29	
BJP	Sudhakar Tukaram Shrangare	547,140	44.28	
VBA	Narsingrao Udgirkar	42,225	3.42	
BSP	Alte Vishwanath Mahadev	5,121	0.41	
Independent	13 Independent Candidates	15,187	1.23	
Others	11 Other Party Candidates	16,818	1.35	
NOTA	None of the Above	3,567	0.29	
Majority		61,881	5.01	
Swing to INC from BJP		Swing		

=== 2019 ===
2019 Indian general elections: Latur
Party	Candidate	Votes	%	±%
BJP	Sudhakar Tukaram Shrangare	661,495	56.90	
INC	Machindra Kamant	3,72,384	31.65	
VBA	Ram Garkar	1,12,255	9.54	
NOTA	None of the Above	6,598	0.56	
BSP	Dr. Siddharth Kumar Digamberrao	6,549	0.56	
Majority		2,89,111	24.57	
Turnout		11,78,089	62.44	
BJP gain from		Swing		

=== General elections 2014 ===
2014 Indian general elections: Latur
Party	Candidate	Votes	%	±%
BJP	Dr. Sunil Baliram Gaikwad	616,509	58.29	+14.29
INC	Dattatray Gunderao Bansode	3,63,114	34.33	−10.62
BSP	Deepak Arvind Kamble	20,029	1.89	−2.21
NOTA	None of the Above	13,996	1.32	N/A
AAP	Deepratna Prabhakarrao Nilangekar	9,829	0.93	N/A
IND.	Sudhir Shripatrao Shinde	8,678	0.82	N/A
Majority		2,53,395	23.96	+23.00
Turnout		10,57,579	62.69	+7.77
BJP gain from INC		Swing	+9.01	

=== General elections 2009 ===
2009 Indian general elections: Latur
Party	Candidate	Votes	%	±%
INC	Jaywant Gangaram Awale	372,890	44.96	−0.49
BJP	Sunil Baliram Gaikwad	3,64,915	44.00	−5.17
BSP	Babasaheb Sadashivrao Gaikwad	34,033	4.10	+2.64
JSS	Ganne Tukaram Rambhau	8,785	1.06	+1.06
Majority		7,975	0.96	−5.42
Turnout		8,29,393	54.93	
INC gain from BJP		Swing	-0.49	

=== General elections 2004 ===
2004 Indian general elections: Latur
Party	Candidate	Votes	%	±%
BJP	Rupatai Patil Nilangekar	403,541	49.17	+5.23
INC	Shivraj Patil	3,72,990	45.45	
BSP	Adv. Laxman Shinde	13,458	1.64	
Independent	Dnyoso Kondekar Alias Vijayprakash	12,459	1.50	
Independent	Shaikh Kalim Allahbaksha	4,589	0.60	
Lok Rajya Party	Adv. Baburao Bandgar	3,297	0.40	
Majority		30,551	6.38	
Turnout		8,20,749	47.45	+3.97
BJP gain from INC		Swing	+3.23	

=== 1999 ===
1999 Indian general election: Latur
Party	Candidate	Votes	%	±%
INC	Patil Shivraj Vishwanath	314,213	41.72	
BJP	Dr. Gopalrao Vitthalrao Patil	273,923	36.37	
NCP	Pasha Patel	155,816	20.69	
Independent	3 Independent Candidates	9,157	1.22	
Majority		40,290	5.35	
Turnout		794,945	72.46	
INC hold		Swing		

=== 1998 ===
1998 Indian general election: Latur
Party	Candidate	Votes	%	±%
INC	Patil Shivraj Vishwanath	322,265	45.53	
BJP	Dr. Gopalrao Patil	318,938	45.06	
JP	Pasha Patel	48,538	6.86	
Independent	4 Independent Candidates	9,808	1.39	
Others	3 Other Party Candidates	8,195	1.16	
Majority		3,327	0.47	
INC hold		Swing		

=== 1996 ===
1996 Indian general election: Latur
Party	Candidate	Votes	%	±%
INC	Shivraj Vishwanath Patil	279,775	41.77	
BJP	Patil Gopalrao Vithalrao	200,403	29.92	
JD	Bapu Kaldate	138,725	20.71	
BSP	Gomare Manoharrao Ekanathrao	7,785	1.16	
AIIC(T)	Shivaji Vithalrao Narhare	925	0.14	
IND	21 Independent Candidates	42,231	6.32	
Majority		79,372	11.85	
INC hold		Swing		

=== 1991 ===
1991 Indian general election: Latur
Party	Candidate	Votes	%	±%
INC	Patil Shivraj Vishwanath	237,853	42.75	
BJP	Gopalrao Vithalrao Patil	179,135	32.19	
JD	Gomare Mandharrao Eknathrao	123,503	22.20	
DDP	Patil Kesharlal Pitamber	3,012	0.54	
IND	Kamble Shivaji Babu	2,804	0.50	
RSD	Sarwade Kamlakar Rukmaji	1,712	0.31	
IND	Kamblekant Piraji	1,635	0.29	
BSP	Uttamrao Laxmanrao	1,339	0.24	
JP	Tarkase Murlidhar Kishanrao	1,183	0.21	
IND	Gunderao Tukaram Ghose	1,139	0.20	
IND	Nade Narsingh Bhagwan	1,043	0.19	
IND	Bhalerao Hiraman Malhari	1,013	0.18	
IND	Pinchani A. Karim Ibrahim	396	0.07	
IND	Pawar Vasant Jaiwantrao	361	0.06	
IND	Vijayprakash Anant Kondekar	302	0.05	
Majority		58,718	10.56	
Turnout		565,679	56.93	
Swing to INC from BJP		Swing		

=== 1989 ===
1989 Indian general election: Latur
Party	Candidate	Votes	%	±%
INC	Patil Shivraj Vishwanath	304,733	50.36	
JD	Bapu Kaldate	260,878	43.11	
BJP	Karde Niwarti Malhari	26,649	4.40	
IND	Hule Suryabhan Govindrao	5,538	0.92	
IND	Kanse Ramchandra Govindrao	2,907	0.48	
IND	Inamdar Naimoddin Asrafali	1,673	0.28	
IND	Udare Shamrao Narayan	1,411	0.23	
IND	Syed Nizamoddin	1,314	0.22	
Majority		43,855	7.25	
Turnout		619,738	63.25	
INC hold		Swing		

=== 1984 ===
1984 Indian general election: Latur
Party	Candidate	Votes	%	±%
INC	Patil Shivraj Vishwanath	289,466	54.43	
IC(S)	Padmasinha Bajirao Patil	203,929	38.35	
IND	Dudile Vithal Tukaram	23,298	4.38	
IND	Pawar Rambhau Aba	3,873	0.73	
IND	R. R. Waghmare	3,001	0.56	
IND	Gaikwad Laxman Maroti	2,231	0.42	
IND	Dawle Motiram Guruji	2,054	0.39	
IND	Awchare Madhav Haibatrao	2,039	0.38	
IND	Lohare Nagnath Sangram	1,924	0.36	
Majority		85,537	16.08	
Turnout		545,382	72.26	
Swing to INC from INC(I)		Swing		

=== 1980 ===
1980 Indian general election: Latur
Party	Candidate	Votes	%	±%
INC(I)	Shivraj Vishwanath Patil	253,948	59.71	
IND	Sonavane Manikrao Sitaram	64,081	15.07	
JP	Syed Yousuf Quadri	53,507	12.58	
PWPI	Patil Uddhavrao Sahebrao	36,526	8.59	
IND	Harne Laxman Govinda	10,810	2.54	
IND	Balure Namdev Narayan	3,664	0.86	
IND	Patil Keshevrao Govindrao	2,784	0.65	
Majority		189,867	44.64	
Turnout		436,280	64.11	
Swing to INC(I) from PWPI		Swing		

=== 1977 ===
1977 Indian general election: Latur
Party	Candidate	Votes	%	±%
PWPI	Patil Uddhavrao Sahebrao	178,815	50.76	
INC	Patil Pandharinath Gyanoba	170,964	48.53	
IND	Sayed Rahiman Hasansab	2,497	0.71	
Majority		7,851	2.23	
Turnout		361,142	59.67	
Swing to PWPI from INC		Swing		

=== 1971 ===
1971 Indian general election: Latur (SC)
Party	Candidate	Votes	%	±%
INC	Tulshiram Dashrath Kamble	156,771	64.95	
SSP	Tukaram Sadashiv Shingare	65,277	27.05	
IND	Piraji Pandurang Kamble	10,864	4.50	
IND	Marotrao Namdeorao	5,090	2.11	
IND	Vithalrao Limbaji Suryavanshi	3,362	1.39	
Majority		91,494	37.90	
Turnout		250,242	43.49	
INC hold		Swing		

=== 1967 ===
1967 Indian general election: Latur (SC)
Party	Candidate	Votes	%	±%
INC	T. D. Kamble	125,896	54.44	
RPI	M. Mangaldas	87,222	37.72	
Independent	D. N. Kamble	18,133	7.84	
Majority		38,674	16.72	
Turnout		243,197	45.29	
INC hold		Swing		

=== 1962 ===
1962 Indian general election: Latur (SC)
Party	Candidate	Votes	%	±%
INC	Tulsiram Dashrath	134,395	57.10	
RPI	Harihar Nagorao	73,004	31.02	
Independent	Madhavrao Devba	27,957	11.88	
Majority		61,391	26.08	
Turnout		246,511	54.15	
INC win (new seat)				

== See also ==
- Latur district
