= Nilanga Assembly constituency =

Constituency of the Maharashtra legislative assembly in India

Coordinates: 18.13°N 76.75°E

Nilanga
- Constituency No. 238 for the Maharashtra Legislative Assembly

Constituency details
- Country: India
- Region: Western India
- State: Maharashtra
- District: Latur
- Established: 1952
- Total electors: 332,194
- Reservation: None

Member of Legislative Assembly
- 15th Maharashtra Legislative Assembly
- Incumbent Sambhaji Patil Nilangekar
- Party: BJP
- Elected year: 2024

Nilanga Assembly constituency is one of six assembly constituencies in Latur Lok Sabha constituency. Since 2008, this assembly constituency is numbered 238 amongst 288 constituencies.

== Members of the Legislative Assembly ==
Election	Member	Party
1952	Sheshrao Madhavrao	Indian National Congress
1957	Salunke Shripatrao Gayanurao	Peasants and Workers Party of India
1962	Shivajirao Patil Nilangekar	Indian National Congress
1967	Shivajirao Patil Nilangekar	Indian National Congress
1972	Shivajirao Patil Nilangekar	Indian National Congress
1978	Shivajirao Patil Nilangekar	Indian National Congress
1980	Shivajirao Patil Nilangekar	Indian National Congress (I)
1985	Diliprao Shivajirao Patil Nilangekar	Indian National Congress
1987 By-election	Shivajirao Patil Nilangekar	Indian National Congress
1990	Shivajirao Patil Nilangekar	Indian National Congress
1995	Manikrao Bhimrao Jadhav	Janata Dal
1999	Shivajirao Patil Nilangekar	Indian National Congress
2004	Sambhaji Patil Nilangekar	Bharatiya Janata Party
2009	Shivajirao Patil Nilangekar	Indian National Congress
2014	Sambhaji Patil Nilangekar	Bharatiya Janata Party
2019	Sambhaji Patil Nilangekar	Bharatiya Janata Party
2024	Sambhaji Patil Nilangekar	Bharatiya Janata Party

== Election results ==
=== Assembly Election 2024 ===
2024 Maharashtra Legislative Assembly election : Nilanga
Party	Candidate	Votes	%	±%
BJP	Sambhaji Patil Nilangekar	112,368	51.06%	▲1.42
INC	Abhay Satish Salunke	98,628	44.82%	▲11.57
VBA	Manju Hiralal Nimbalkar	3,935	1.79%	▼13.42
RSPS	Nagnath Ramrao Bodake	1,430	0.65%	New
NOTA	None of the above	931	0.42%	▼0.23
Margin of victory		13,740	6.24%	▼10.15
Turnout		220,998	66.53%	▲4.22
Total valid votes		220,067		
Registered electors		332,194		▲4.90
BJP hold		Swing	▲1.42	

=== Assembly Election 2019 ===
2019 Maharashtra Legislative Assembly election : Nilanga
Party	Candidate	Votes	%	±%
BJP	Sambhaji Patil Nilangekar	97,324	49.64%	▲9.80
INC	Ashok Shivajirao Patil Nilangekar	65,193	33.25%	▲7.68
VBA	Arvind Virbhadrappa Bhatambre	29,819	15.21%	New
NOTA	None of the above	1,272	0.65%	▲0.24
Margin of victory		32,131	16.39%	▲2.12
Turnout		197,342	62.31%	▼5.42
Total valid votes		196,046		
Registered electors		316,690		▲10.73
BJP hold		Swing	▲9.80	

=== Assembly Election 2014 ===
2014 Maharashtra Legislative Assembly election : Nilanga
Party	Candidate	Votes	%	±%
BJP	Sambhaji Patil Nilangekar	76,817	39.84%	▲1.20
INC	Ashok Shivajirao Patil Nilangekar	49,306	25.57%	▼17.16
Maharashtra Vikas Aghadi	Reshme Limbanappa Vishwanathappa	17,675	9.17%	New
NCP	Baswaraj Malashetti Patil Nagralkar	16,149	8.38%	New
MNS	Abhay Satish Salunke	16,015	8.31%	▲5.90
SS	Dr. Shobhatai Vaijanath Benjarge	11,522	5.98%	New
BSP	Adv. Sidharth Deshmukh Ambegaonkar	1,350	0.70%	▼4.93
NOTA	None of the above	791	0.41%	New
Margin of victory		27,511	14.27%	▲10.17
Turnout		193,720	67.73%	▼0.91
Total valid votes		192,794		
Registered electors		286,012		▲7.18
BJP gain from INC		Swing	▼2.89	

=== Assembly Election 2009 ===
2009 Maharashtra Legislative Assembly election : Nilanga
Party	Candidate	Votes	%	±%
INC	Shivajirao Patil Nilangekar	78,267	42.73%	▲0.85
BJP	Sambhaji Patil Nilangekar	70,763	38.64%	▼4.78
BSP	Mohammaed Rafi Shamshoddin Sayyad	10,315	5.63%	▲3.44
RSPS	Subhash Anandrao Shinde	6,034	3.29%	New
JSS	Patil Madhavrao Hanmantrao	5,722	3.12%	▼5.45
MNS	Abhay Satish Salunke	4,408	2.41%	New
Independent	Balaji Pundlik Shinde	2,122	1.16%	New
Independent	Hari Babu Kale	1,282	0.70%	New
Margin of victory		7,504	4.10%	▲2.56
Turnout		183,151	68.64%	▼3.26
Total valid votes		183,150		
Registered electors		266,845		▲25.51
INC gain from BJP		Swing	▼0.69	

=== Assembly Election 2004 ===
2004 Maharashtra Legislative Assembly election : Nilanga
Party	Candidate	Votes	%	±%
BJP	Sambhaji Patil Nilangekar	66,346	43.42%	New
INC	Nilangekar Patil Shivajirao Bhaurao	63,990	41.88%	▼3.44
JSS	Mane Sunil Baburao	13,092	8.57%	New
BSP	Patel Farad Khaja Saheb	3,351	2.19%	New
Independent	Motibone Nandu Ram	1,955	1.28%	New
Independent	Chikundre Gokul Jyotiba	986	0.65%	New
Margin of victory		2,356	1.54%	▼16.94
Turnout		152,878	71.90%	▼0.92
Total valid votes		152,792		
Registered electors		212,617		▲19.54
BJP gain from INC		Swing	▼1.90	

=== Assembly Election 1999 ===
1999 Maharashtra Legislative Assembly election : Nilanga
Party	Candidate	Votes	%	±%
INC	Shivajirao Patil Nilangekar	54,705	45.32%	▲16.14
JD(S)	Jadhav Manikrao Bhimrao	32,398	26.84%	New
SS	Mane Sunil Baburao	16,187	13.41%	▲9.98
Independent	Kamble Shahuraj Vithoba	11,613	9.62%	New
Independent	Gaikwad Nilkanth Keshavrao	2,767	2.29%	New
Independent	Pawar Baburao Daulatrao	2,219	1.84%	New
Margin of victory		22,307	18.48%	▼8.42
Turnout		129,528	72.82%	▼10.99
Total valid votes		120,720		
Registered electors		177,870		▲8.77
INC gain from JD		Swing	▼10.76	

=== Assembly Election 1995 ===
1995 Maharashtra Legislative Assembly election : Nilanga
Party	Candidate	Votes	%	±%
JD	Jadhav Manikrao Bhimrao	75,041	56.08%	New
INC	Patil Shivajirao Bhaurao	39,047	29.18%	▼23.68
Independent	Patel Syedpasha Osmansab	8,562	6.40%	New
SS	Suryawanshi Chanchalabai Devidas	4,592	3.43%	▼0.50
Independent	Gaikwad Dattu Laxman	1,049	0.78%	New
Doordarshi Party	Chawada Santosh Ramkrishna	953	0.71%	▲0.16
Independent	Katakdound Sakharam Maroti	839	0.63%	New
Margin of victory		35,994	26.90%	▲14.53
Turnout		137,048	83.81%	▲18.81
Total valid votes		133,801		
Registered electors		163,526		▼1.89
JD gain from INC		Swing	▲3.22	

=== Assembly Election 1990 ===
1990 Maharashtra Legislative Assembly election : Nilanga
Party	Candidate	Votes	%	±%
INC	Shivajirao Patil Nilangekar	56,312	52.86%	▼24.93
Independent	Mane Vishwambharrao Shankarrao	43,136	40.49%	New
SS	Shryawanshi Devidas Jaiwantrao	4,186	3.93%	New
Margin of victory		13,176	12.37%	▼52.26
Turnout		108,347	65.00%	
Total valid votes		106,529		
Registered electors		166,678		
INC hold		Swing	▼24.93	

=== Assembly By-election 1987 ===
1987 Maharashtra Legislative Assembly by-election : Nilanga
Party	Candidate	Votes	%	±%
INC	Shivajirao Patil Nilangekar	75,482	77.79%	▲8.95
PWPI	P. V. B. Wegedkai	12,770	13.16%	▼11.72
BJP	T. U. Manikrao	5,494	5.66%	New
Independent	S. D. Namdeo	1,517	1.56%	New
Independent	K. A. Yadav	1,279	1.32%	New
Margin of victory		62,712	64.63%	▲20.68
Total valid votes		97,039		
INC hold		Swing	▲8.95	

=== Assembly Election 1985 ===
1985 Maharashtra Legislative Assembly election : Nilanga
Party	Candidate	Votes	%	±%
INC	Diliprao Shivajirao Patil Nilangekar	61,946	68.84%	New
PWPI	Somwanshi Madhukarrao Ganpatrao	22,391	24.88%	▼13.21
Independent	Gaikwad Digamber Rama	2,483	2.76%	New
Independent	Tondare Somnath Baswanppa	1,780	1.98%	New
Independent	Surwase Dnyanoba Namdeo	576	0.64%	New
Margin of victory		39,555	43.95%	▲27.79
Turnout		91,487	68.99%	▲0.39
Total valid votes		89,992		
Registered electors		132,608		▲10.95
INC gain from INC(I)		Swing	▲14.59	

=== Assembly Election 1980 ===
1980 Maharashtra Legislative Assembly election : Nilanga
Party	Candidate	Votes	%	±%
INC(I)	Shivajirao Patil Nilangekar	43,550	54.25%	New
PWPI	Somwanshi Madhukarrao Ganpatrao	30,575	38.09%	▼4.28
INC(U)	Shinde Vithalrao Raghunathrao	4,627	5.76%	New
Independent	Kambale Laxman Rajba	1,015	1.26%	New
Independent	Gaikwad Tulshiram Maroti	510	0.64%	New
Margin of victory		12,975	16.16%	▲9.43
Turnout		81,984	68.60%	▼8.59
Total valid votes		80,277		
Registered electors		119,517		▲5.62
INC(I) gain from INC		Swing	▲5.15	

=== Assembly Election 1978 ===
1978 Maharashtra Legislative Assembly election : Nilanga
Party	Candidate	Votes	%	±%
INC	Shivajirao Patil Nilangekar	41,664	49.10%	▼0.98
PWPI	Salunke Shripatrao Gayanurao	35,955	42.37%	▼1.71
Independent	Suryavanshi Maruti Vishwanath	5,080	5.99%	New
Independent	Waghmare Vishwanath Bapurao	2,163	2.55%	New
Margin of victory		5,709	6.73%	▲0.74
Turnout		87,342	77.19%	▲8.36
Total valid votes		84,862		
Registered electors		113,157		▲10.60
INC hold		Swing	▼0.98	

=== Assembly Election 1972 ===
1972 Maharashtra Legislative Assembly election : Nilanga
Party	Candidate	Votes	%	±%
INC	Shivajirao Patil Nilangekar	34,144	50.08%	▼5.26
PWPI	Madhukarrao Somawase	30,058	44.08%	▲6.23
Independent	Patil Mohanrao Bhimrao	2,648	3.88%	New
RPI	Shivadas Parmeshware	1,333	1.96%	New
Margin of victory		4,086	5.99%	▼11.50
Turnout		70,419	68.83%	▼4.56
Total valid votes		68,183		
Registered electors		102,309		▲12.90
INC hold		Swing	▼5.26	

=== Assembly Election 1967 ===
1967 Maharashtra Legislative Assembly election : Nilanga
Party	Candidate	Votes	%	±%
INC	Shivajirao Patil Nilangekar	32,744	55.34%	▼1.89
PWPI	S. G. Solunke	22,394	37.85%	▼4.92
Independent	D. B. Surwase	3,597	6.08%	New
ABJS	Y. G. Patil	429	0.73%	New
Margin of victory		10,350	17.49%	▲3.03
Turnout		66,510	73.39%	▼0.65
Total valid votes		59,164		
Registered electors		90,621		▲10.31
INC hold		Swing	▼1.89	

=== Assembly Election 1962 ===
1962 Maharashtra Legislative Assembly election : Nilanga
Party	Candidate	Votes	%	±%
INC	Shivajirao Patil Nilangekar	33,125	57.23%	▲8.96
PWPI	Sripatrao Gayanurao	24,756	42.77%	▼8.96
Margin of victory		8,369	14.46%	▲11.00
Turnout		60,829	74.04%	▲12.55
Total valid votes		57,881		
Registered electors		82,153		▲42.73
INC gain from PWPI		Swing	▲5.50	

=== Assembly Election 1957 ===
1957 Bombay State Legislative Assembly election : Nilanga
Party	Candidate	Votes	%	±%
PWPI	Salunke Shripatrao Gayanurao	18,309	51.73%	▲21.60
INC	Shivaji Bhaurao	17,084	48.27%	▼8.70
Margin of victory		1,225	3.46%	▼23.39
Turnout		35,393	61.49%	▲7.64
Total valid votes		35,393		
Registered electors		57,557		▲16.03
PWPI gain from INC		Swing	▼5.24	

=== Assembly Election 1952 ===
1952 Hyderabad State Legislative Assembly election : Nilanga
Party	Candidate	Votes	%	±%
INC	Sheshrao Madhavrao	15,220	56.97%	New
PWPI	Ekemberkar Bapurao Vithalrao	8,048	30.13%	New
Socialist	Ramrao Eknathrao Vakil	3,446	12.90%	New
Margin of victory		7,172	26.85%	
Turnout		26,714	53.85%	
Total valid votes		26,714		
Registered electors		49,607		
INC win (new seat)				
