= Supriya Sule =

Indian politician (born 1969)

Supriya Sadanand Sule
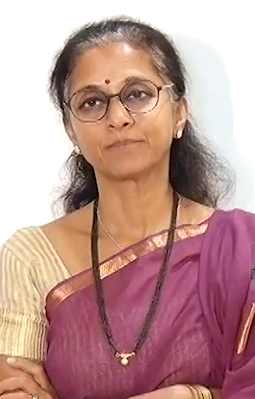
- Sule in 2014

Member of Parliament, Lok Sabha
- Incumbent
- Assumed office 16 May 2009
- Preceded by: Sharad Pawar
- Constituency: Baramati, Maharashtra

Leader of the Nationalist Congress Party (Sharadchandra Pawar) in Lok Sabha
- Incumbent
- Assumed office 7 February 2024
- National President: Sharad Pawar
- LS Speaker: Om Birla
- Preceded by: office established

National Working President of Nationalist Congress Party (Sharadchandra Pawar)
- Incumbent
- Assumed office 1 June 2024
- National President: Sharad Pawar
- Incharge of States: Maharashtra; Punjab; Haryana
- Department: Lok Sabha (Election Head)
- Preceded by: office established

Member of Parliament, Rajya Sabha
- In office 18 September 2006 – 16 May 2009
- Preceded by: Vasant Chavan
- Succeeded by: Ranjitsinh Mohite-Patil
- Constituency: Maharashtra

Personal details
- Born: Supriya Sharad Pawar; 30 June 1969 (age 57) Pune, Maharashtra, India
- Party: Nationalist Congress Party (Sharadchandra Pawar) (2024–present)
- Other political affiliations: Nationalist Congress Party (2006–2024)
- Spouse: Sadanand Sule (m. 1991)
- Children: 2
- Parent: Sharad Pawar (father)
- Education: Jai Hind College, Mumbai
- Occupation: Politician; Social worker

Supriya Sadanand Sule (née Pawar; born 30 June 1969) is an Indian politician from the Nationalist Congress Party (Sharadchandra Pawar) and currently a Member of Parliament, Lok Sabha representing Baramati since 2009, leader of the party in Lok Sabha since 2014 and the Working National President of Nationalist Congress Party since 2023. She is awarded with Sansad Ratna awards in 2025 for her excellence performance in parliamentary duties.

Previously, she served as the Member of Parliament, Rajya Sabha from Maharashtra from 2006 to 2009. In 2011, she launched a state-wide campaign against female foeticide. In 2014, she was awarded with the Mumbai Women of the Decade Achievers Award for Excellence in Social Service by All Ladies League for social service.

== Early life and education ==
Sule was born to Indian politician and Nationalist Congress Party founder Sharad Pawar and his wife, Pratibha Pawar, on 30 June 1969 in Pune, Maharashtra. She studied at St. Columba School in Gamdevi, Mumbai. She then completed her B.Sc. degree in microbiology from the Jai Hind College, Mumbai.

== Political career ==
Sule was elected to the Rajya Sabha in the September 2006 intake from Maharashtra and is a trustee of the Nehru Centre in Mumbai.

In 2012, under the leadership of Sule, the wing named Rashtravadi Yuvati Congress was formed to give platform to young girls in politics. For months past, several rallies had been organised all over Maharashtra which focused on female fetus abortion, dowry system and women empowerment in general.

Sule is known for her parliamentary engagement as a member of the Lok Sabha, with her emerging as one of the Best Performers In Lok Sabha on multiple occasions.

== Involvement with IPL Irregularities ==
In June 2010, Sule denied allegations of involvement in the Indian Premier League (IPL), when reports on IPL irregularities in its ownership and functioning surfaced and led to Shashi Tharoor, India's Minister of State for External Affairs to resign. However, there were reports that her husband owned (via a power of attorney from his father) 10% of a firm that had exclusive multi-year broadcasting rights for IPL matches.

In June 2010, The Economic Times, India's largest business newspaper, reported that Sharad Pawar and Supriya Sule owned 16.22 percent of a firm that had bid for the Pune franchise of IPL. She had previously stated, "I say with full conviction that my husband or my family has nothing to do with these issues (the IPL bids) ... We always stay miles away from it. Yes, we are avid cricket watchers, my husband, my kids, my family, all, and that's where the buck stops." When challenged on this, she said she was just a minority shareholder and cannot be responsible for the firm's actions.

== Personal life ==
She married Sadanand Bhalchandra Sule on 4 March 1991. They have one son - Vijay and one daughter - Revati. After marriage, she spent some time in California, where she studied water pollution at UC Berkeley. Subsequently, she moved to Indonesia and Singapore and then returned to Mumbai.

== Electoral performance ==
Election candidature history
Election	Year	Party	Constituency	Opponent		Result	Margin
Loksabha	2009	NCP	Baramati	BJP	Kanta Nalawade	Won	3,36,831
Loksabha	2014	NCP	Baramati	RSPS	Mahadev Jankar	Won	69,719
Loksabha	2019	NCP	Baramati	BJP	Kanchan Rahul Kul	Won	1,55,774
Loksabha	2024	NCP-SP	Baramati	NCP	Sunetra Pawar	Won	1,58,333

Lok Sabha
Preceded by Sharad Pawar	Member of Parliament for Baramati; 2009	Incumbent
