= Sudhakar Tukaram Shrangare =

Indian politician

Member of parliament Lok Sabha
- In office May 2019 – June 2024
- Preceded by: Sunil Gaikwad
- Succeeded by: Shivaji Kalge
- Constituency: Latur

Personal details
- Born: 5 May 1962 (age 64) Gharani Latur Maharashtra
- Party: Bhartiya Janta Party
- Occupation: Business, farming

Sudhakar Tukaram Shrangare is an Indian politician and a member of parliament to the 17th Lok Sabha from Latur constituency, Maharashtra. He won the 2019 Indian general election being a Bharatiya Janata Party candidate.

He is an official candidate of BJP in 2024 Lok Sabha elections from Latur Lok Sabha constituency.

== Positions held ==
=== Within BJP ===
- Member of Zilla Parishad, Wadwal, Maharashtra (2017–2019)
- District planning board member in Zilla Parishad.
- Member of Parliament 17th Loksabha, Latur Constituency
