= Latur =

Latur Lātūra
- City
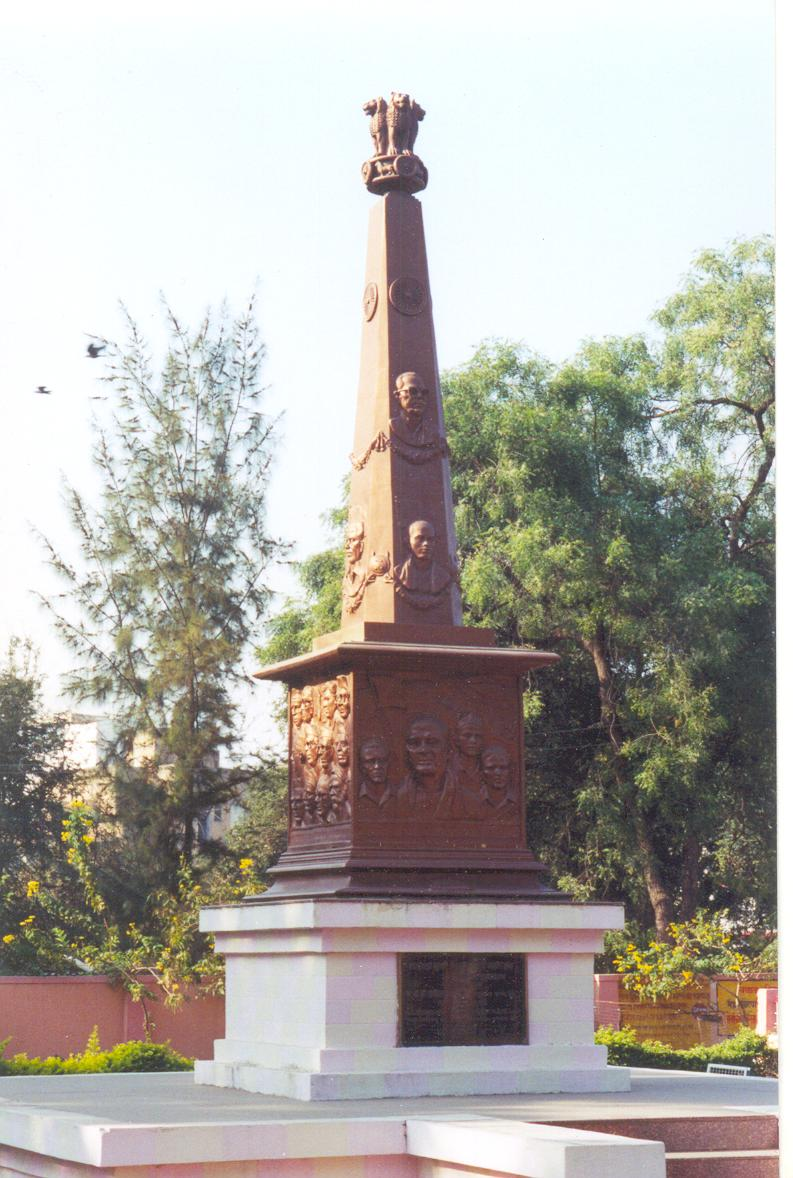
- Marathwada Martyr Monument (Marathwada Hutatma Smarak), located in the city
- Nickname: Adishru
- Interactive map of Latur
- Coordinates: 18.40°N 76.56°E
- Country: India
- State: Maharashtra
- District: Latur
- Settled: Possibly 7th century AD

Government
  - Type: Municipal Corporation
  - Body: Latur City Municipal Corporation
  - Mayor: Jayashri Sonkamble (INC)
  - Municipal Commissioner: Smt. Mansi Meena, IAS
  - MLAs: Amit Deshmukh – Latur City; Ramesh Karad– Latur Rural
  - Member of Parliament: Dr. Shivajiao Kalge (INC)

Area
  - City: 32.56 km^{2} (12.57 sq mi)
  - Rank: 16th (Maharashtra); 120th (India)
- Elevation: 515 m (1,690 ft)

Population (2011)
  - City: 266,955
  - Density: 8,199/km^{2} (21,230/sq mi)
  - Metro: 300,000
- Demonym: Laturkar
- Time zone: UTC+5:30 (IST)
- PIN: 413 512; 413 531
- Telephone code: 91-02382
- Vehicle registration: MH-24/MH-55
- Official language: Marathi
- Sex ratio: 923.54 ♀/1000 ♂
- Literacy: 96.76
- Climate: BSh (Köppen)
- Precipitation: 860.9 mm
- Avg. summer temperature: 41 °C (106 °F)
- Avg. winter temperature: 13 °C (55 °F)
- Website: latur.gov.in

Latur (ISO: Lātūra; formerly Ratnapur) is a city located in the Marathwada region of Maharashtra state of India country. Before 1982 Latur was a part of the Osmanabad district (now Dharashiv). The city is a tourist hub surrounded by many historical monuments like Kharosa Caves. The most spoken language in Latur is Marathi.

The city's quality of education attracts students from all over Maharashtra. It is a drought prone area with acute water shortage in its city and rural areas. The economy is agriculture intensive, but in recent years is also dependent on Educational sector and its allied activities. Industrial development is minimal in the district. Latur is 43 kilometers from the epicenter in killari of the devastating 1993 Latur earthquake.

== History ==
Latur has an ancient history, which probably dates to the Rashtrakuta period. It was home to a branch of the Rashtrakutas which ruled the Deccan from 753 to 973 AD. The first Rashtrakuta king, Dantidurga, was from Lattaluru, the ancient name for Latur. Ratnapur is also mentioned as an historic name for Latur.

The King Amoghavarsha of the Rashtrakutas developed the Latur city. The Rashtrakutas who succeeded the Chalukyas of Badami in 753 AD called themselves the residents of Lattaluru.

In Latur's Papvinashak Temple a 12th-century inscription of King Someshvara III was found. According to that inscription, 500 scholars were living in Lattlaur (Latur) at that time and that Latur was the city of King Someshwar.

In the 19th century, Latur became part of the Princely state of Hyderabad. In 1905 it was merged with surrounding areas and renamed Latur tehsil, becoming part of Osmanabad district. Before 1948, Latur was a part of Hyderabad State under Nizam. The chief of the Razakar's, Qasim Rizwi, was from Latur.

After Indian independence and the Indian annexation of Hyderabad, Osmanabad became part of Bombay Province. In 1960, with the creation of Maharashtra, Latur became part of one of its districts. On 16 August 1982, a separate Latur district was carved out of Osmanabad district.

== Geography and climate ==
Latur

Climate chart (precipitation, max. and min. temperature)
J	F	M	A	M	J	J	A	S	O	N	D
2.8 29 12	2.1 32 14	3.3 36 19	3.5 38 22	24 38 25	114 34 24	116 30 22	120 29 21	122 30 21	61 32 19	11 30 15	6.5 28 12
- █ Average max. and min. temperatures in °C
- █ Precipitation totals in mm
- Source: MSN Weather
Imperial conversion
J	F	M	A	M	J	J	A	S	O	N	D
0.1 84 54	0.1 90 57	0.1 97 66	0.1 100 72	1 100 77	4.5 93 75	4.6 86 72	4.7 84 70	4.8 86 70	2.4 90 66	0.4 86 59	0.3 82 54
- █ Average max. and min. temperatures in °F
- █ Precipitation totals in inches

Latur is situated 636 metres above mean sea level, on the Balaghat plateau, near the Maharashtra–Karnataka state boundary. It receives its drinking water from the nearby Manjira River, which suffered from environmental degradation and silting in the late 20th and early 21st centuries. As a result of this and lack of implementation of a water management strategy, during the drought of the 2010s the city ran out of water.

Temperature: Temperatures in Latur range from 13 to 41 °C (55 to 106 °F), with the most comfortable time to visit in the winter, which is October to February. The highest temperature ever recorded was 45.6 °C (114.1 °F). The lowest recorded temperature was 2.2 °C (36.0 °F). In the cold season the district is sometimes affected by cold waves in association with the eastward passage of western disturbances across north India, when the minimum temperature may drop down to about 2 to 4 °C (36 to 39 °F).

Rainfall: Most of the rainfall occurs in the monsoon season from June to September. Rainfall varies from 9.0 to 693 millimetres (0.35 to 27.28 in) per month. Average annual rainfall is 725 millimetres (28.5 in).

Recently, Latur has been bearing the brunt of climate change. Extreme weather episodes, including torrential rainfall and even hailstorms in summers, have been showing up in Latur for over a decade now.

Latur has been ranked 29th best “National Clean Air City” under (Category 2 3-10L Population cities) in India.

=== Latur earthquake of 1993 ===
On 30 September 1993, at 3:53 a.m. local time, Latur was almost completely destroyed by a devastating intraplate earthquake that affected the southern Marathwada region of Maharashtra state in central-western part of India—including Latur, Beed, Osmanabad, and adjoining districts about 400 kilometres (250 mi) south-east of Mumbai—and resulted in a huge loss of life. The earthquake measured only 6.3 on the Richter magnitude scale, but its focus was relatively shallow, at around 12 kilometres (7.5 mi) deep. Consequently, the resultant shock waves, being unattenuated, caused more damage. The quake caused around 10,000 deaths and 30,000 were injured, mainly due to the poor construction of stone houses and huts which collapsed on people who were fast asleep. After the earthquake, seismic zones were reclassified, and building codes and standards revised, all over India.

== Demographics ==
Population growth
Year	Pop.	±%
1931	29,000	—
1971	67,000	+131.0%
1981	101,000	+50.7%
1991	159,200	+57.6%
2001	299,179	+87.9%
2011	382,940	+28.0%
Source:Census of India

Religions in Latur City (2011)
Religion	Percent
Hinduism	70.14%
Islam	23.95%
Buddhism	4.60%
Jainism	0.79%
Other or not stated	0.52%

Latur's population, as of the 2011 census, is 382,940. it has a sex ratio of 937 females per 1000 males and a literacy rate of 84.22%. 12.49% of the population is under six years of age. Scheduled Castes and Scheduled Tribes make up 17.62% and 1.45% of the population respectively.

Language in Latur City (2011)
1. Marathi (71.9%)
2. Hindi (12.9%)
3. Urdu (11.3%)
4. Marwari (1.75%)
5. Other (2.13%)

At the time of the 2011 census, 71.92% of the population spoke Marathi, 12.88% Hindi, 11.32% Urdu and 1.75% Marwari as their first language.

== Administration and politics ==
=== Local administration ===
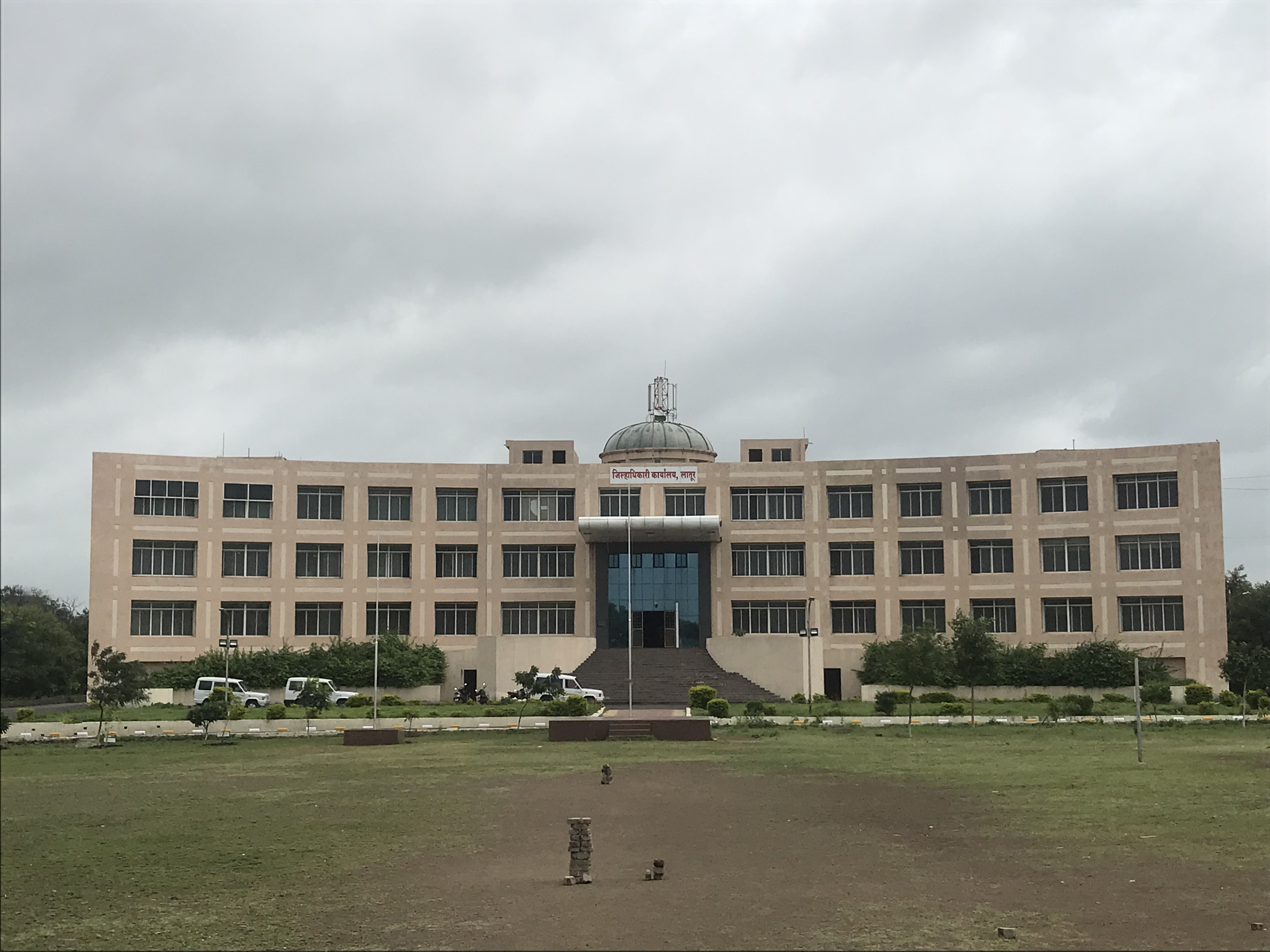
Office of Collector, Latur

Latur has an earlier Municipal Council, which was established in 1952. Latur Municipal Corporation (LMC) is the local civil body. It is divided into five zones. The Municipal Corporation area is about 117.78 square kilometres (45.48 sq mi). It was elevated to the status of Municipal Corporation by the State Government in 2011.

The Urban Development Dept., Govt. of Maharashtra expressed its desire vide letter dated 30/10/2006 to notify fringe area of Latur and appoint CIDCO as its Special Planning Authority. CIDCO has submitted its proposal to notify the fringe area measuring approx. 26541.00 ha. inclusive of urbanisable zone of about 16696 ha. Govt. has appointed CIDCO as Special Planning Authority. The notified area covers 40 villages on the fringe of Latur Municipal Corporation. It is envisaged in the project not to acquire 100% land but to adopt minimum land acquisition model for development of infrastructure and growth corridors.

The city is divided in 70 electoral wards called as Prabhag and each ward is represented by a Corporator (called as Nagarsevak) elected by the people from each ward. LMC is responsible for providing basic amenities such as drinking water, drainage facility, road, street lights, healthcare facilities and primary schools. LMC collects its revenue from the urban taxes which are imposed on citizens. The administration is headed by the Commissioner of Municipal Corporation; an I.A.S. Officer, assisted by the other officers of different departments.

=== State and central administration ===
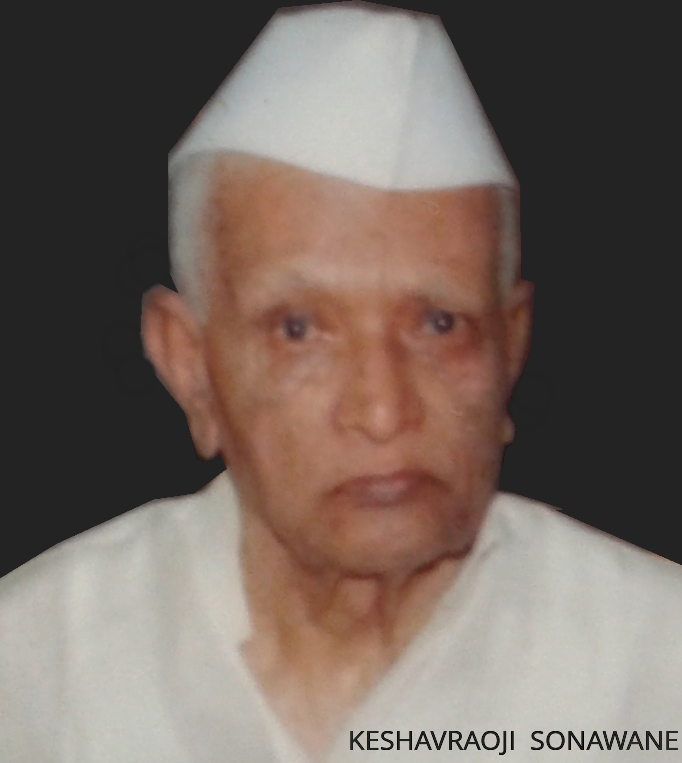
Keshavrao Sonawane, first minister from Latur constituency.

Latur contributes one seat to the Lok Sabha. The seat is currently held by Dr. Shivaji Kalge, MP, of the INC. It also holds one seat for the Assembly - Latur Indian National Congress. In latest constituency arrangements made by Election Commission of India, Latur will contribute one Loksabha seat, and two state assembly seats, i.e. Latur City and Latur Rural.

=== Prominent politicians from Latur ===
The city is the birthplace of Shivraj Patil, who served as home minister of India,

Vilasrao Deshmukh is the chief minister of the Maharashtra was the MLA from Latur constituency.

Amidst national political controversy is the death, on 1 December 2014, of judge Brijgopal Harkishan Loya of the Central Bureau of Investigation, who was addressing the case involving Amit Shah, the national leader of the Bharatiya Janata Party (BJP) and who was cremated at his native village of Gategaon.

Vikrant Vikram Gojamgunde is the mayor of Latur. He became mayor in 2019. He is the youngest mayor in the state of Maharashtra.

== Education and research ==
Latur has developed into an educational hub for secondary, higher secondary, and university education. The district is known in Maharashtra for its "Latur Pattern" of study, which involves intensive coaching given in the city. Students of junior colleges in Latur have a good record in taking competitive engineering and medical entrance exams.

=== Basic and higher education ===
Public schools (known locally as municipality schools) are run by the LMC, and are affiliated with the MSBSHSE. Private schools are run by educational trusts or individuals. They are usually affiliated with either the state board or national education boards, such as the ICSE or CBSE boards.

=== University education ===
Due to more than 140 colleges, the city is known as an educational hub in Marathwada. Many of the students studying in the colleges and the university are from nearby districts. Most colleges in Latur are affiliated with the Nanded University. There is a sub-center of SRTMUN at Latur.

The Sandipani Technical Campus - Faculty of Engineering, Latur, founded in 2011 by Shri. Vinodji Agrawal, is one of the leading engineering colleges in Marathwada. Along with Engineering Courses like Civil Engineering, Computer Engineering, Electronics and Telecommunication Engineering, Mechanical Engineering, most demanding Artificial Intelligence and Data Science Engineering was also included recently in the college. Polytechnic courses of Civil, Computer and Mechanical are also available for the students of this region in this reputed college campus.

The M. S. Bidve Engineering College, Latur, founded in 1983, is one of the oldest engineering colleges in Marathwada. The Maharashtra Institute of Medical Science & Research Latur was founded in 1988 by Vishwanath Karad.

The Border Security Force Training Centre, Chakur and the Disaster Management Training Institute were established in Latur in 2005 and 2008, respectively.

Dayanand Law College was established by the Dayanand Education Society. Established medical schools such as the Government Medical College, Manjara Ayurvedic College are present in the city.

Channabasweshwar Pharmacy College is a degree college that provides diploma, degree, and master courses in the pharmacy field. Other pharmacy colleges are Dayanand College of Pharmacy and Vilasrao Deshmukh College of Pharmacy.

Vilasrao Deshmukh Foundation's (VDF) College is a degree college that provides diploma, degree, and courses in the engineering and pharmacy field. Other pharmacy colleges are Dayanand College of Pharmacy and Vilasrao Deshmukh College of Pharmacy.

Rajarshi Shahu College, Latur, is a reputed college for undergraduate as well as post graduate education. It provides education in Arts, Humanities, Social Sciences, Natural Sciences, Mathematics and Commerce.

=== Professional education ===
Latur is home to a branch of the Western India Regional Council of the Institute of Chartered Accountants of India, along with an exam centre, Information Technology training lab, reading room, and a library for Chartered Accountants as well as for students.

Medical education is provided by the Vilasrao Deshmukh Government Medical College and Institute, a public institute of medicine under the Maharashtra University of Health Sciences. Maharashtra Academy for Education and Research (MAERS Pune) runs a private medical college known as Maharashtra Institute of Medical Sciences and Research MIMSR and Yeshwantrao Chavan Rural Hospital, Latur.

Engineering and technology education is provided by Sandipani Technical Campus - Faculty of Engineering and Polytechnic, M.S. Bidve College of Engineering, Puranmal Lahoti Government Polytechnic, and Government Residential Women's Polytechnic Latur.

== Economy. ==
The city is a major sugarcane and edible oils, soybean, grapes and mango production centre. A blend of mango with locally grown mangoes was developed as Keshar Amba. Oil seeds were the major produce of the Latur region. So for benefit of farmers Keshavrao Sonavane had established Dalda Factory which was Asia's first oil mill set up on cooperative terms.

== Notable sites ==
- Siddheshwar & Ratneshwar Temple is situated about 2 kilometres (2,000 m) from the city. It was built by King Tamradwaj and dedicated to Siddheshwar,

== Geographical location ==
Latur city is situated in Marathwada region in southern part of Maharashtra. Latur is 498 km from state capital Mumbai and 484 km from winter capital Nagpur(via Nanded, Yawatmal, Wardha).

== Notable people ==
- Shivraj Vishwanath Patil is an Indian politician who was the Governor of the state of Punjab and Administrator of the Union Territory of Chandigarh from 2010 to 2015. Previously, he was the Speaker of the 10th Lok Sabha from 1991 to 1996 and served in Manmohan Singh's cabinet as Union Minister of Home Affairs from 2004 to 2008. He also served in the Indira Gandhi and Rajiv Gandhi cabinets as Minister of Defence during the 1980s.
- Vilasrao Deshmukh was an Indian politician from the Indian National Congress. He served as the Chief Minister of Maharashtra twice, first from 1999 to 2003 and again from 2004 to 2008. Later, he held several Union Cabinet portfolios including Heavy Industries, Rural Development, and Science & Technology. Known for promoting the Latur Pattern of education and urban infrastructure development, he remained an influential figure in Maharashtra politics. He was also the father of Bollywood actor Riteish Deshmukh.
- Amit Vilasrao Deshmukh 3rd Term MLA Of Latur City & Former Cabinet Minister.
- Ramesh Karad is an Indian politician and 1st Time Member of Legislative Assembly from Latur Rural In 2024 Assembly Elections. He belongs to Bhartiya janta party
- Sambhaji Patil Nilangekar is a Member of the 13th Maharashtra Legislative Assembly and represents Nilanga. He is a member of the Bharatiya Janata Party (BJP). Nilangekar was inducted into the cabinet of Devendra Fadnavis in 2016 and has the portfolio of Labour Skill Development & Entrepreneurship.
- Keshavrao Sonavane was the minister of co-operation in Yashwantrao Chavan's cabinet and later Vasantrao Naik's cabinet during 1962–1967. He was elected as Member of the Maharashtra Legislative Assembly 4 times, twice from Latur City and twice from Ausa.

== See also ==
- Marathwada
- List of Indian princely states
- List of Maratha dynasties and states
- Maratha Empire
