= List of cities in Maharashtra by population =

The following is a list of the most populous cities in Maharashtra state of India as per the 2011 census. There are 43 cities in Maharashtra which have a population over 100,000.

== List of cities ==
Rank (2011)	City	District	Population 2011	Population 2001	Population 1991
1	Mumbai	Mumbai City; Mumbai Suburban	12,442,373	11,978,450	9,925,891
2	Pune	Pune	3,124,458	2,538,473	1,566,651
3	Nagpur	Nagpur	2,405,665	2,052,066	1,624,752
4	Thane	Thane	1,841,488	1,262,551	803,369
5	Pimpri-Chinchwad	Pune	1,727,692	1,012,472	517,083
6	Nashik	Nashik	1,486,053	1,077,236	656,925
7	Kalyan-Dombivli	Thane	1,247,327	1,193,512	1,014,557
8	Vasai-Virar	Palghar	1,222,390	–	
9	Aurangabad	Aurangabad	1,175,116	873,311	573,272
10	Navi Mumbai	Thane; Raigad	1,120,547	704,002	304,724
11	Solapur	Solapur	951,558	872,478	604,215
12	Mira-Bhayandar	Thane	809,378	520,388	175,605
13	Bhiwandi	Thane	709,665	598,741	379,070
14	Amravati	Amravati	647,057	549,510	421,576
15	Nanded	Nanded	550,439	430,733	275,083
16	Kolhapur	Kolhapur	549,236	493,167	406,370
17	Ulhasnagar	Thane	506,098	473,731	369,077
18	Sangli	Sangli	502,793	436,781	193,197
19	Malegaon	Nashik	471,228	409,403	342,595
20	Jalgaon	Jalgaon	460,228	368,618	242,193
21	Akola	Akola	425,817	400,520	328,034
22	Latur	Latur	382,940	299,985	197,408
23	Dhule	Dhule	375,559	341,755	278,317
24	Ahmednagar	Ahmednagar	350,859	307,615	181,339
25	Chandrapur	Chandrapur	320,379	289,450	226,105
26	Parbhani	Parbhani	307,170	259,329	190,255
27	Ichalkaranji	Kolhapur	287,353	257,610	214,950
28	Jalna	Jalna	285,577	235,795	174,985
29	Ambarnath	Thane	253,475	203,804	–
30	Bhusawal	Jalgaon	187,421	172,372	145,143
31	Panvel	Raigad	180,020	104,058	58,986
32	Badlapur	Thane	174,226	97,948	–
33	Beed	Beed	146,709	138,196	112,434
34	Gondia	Gondia	132,813	120,902	109,470
35	Satara	Satara	120,195	108,048	95,180
36	Barshi	Solapur	118,722	104,785	88,810
37	Yavatmal	Yavatmal	116,551	120,676	108,578
38	Achalpur	Amravati	112,311	107,316	96,229
39	Osmanabad	Osmanabad	111,825	80,625	68,019
40	Nandurbar	Nandurbar	111,037	94,368	78,378
41	Wardha	Wardha	106,444	111,118	102,985
42	Udgir	Latur	103,550	91,933	70,453
43	Hinganghat	Wardha	101,805	92,342	78,715

== See also ==
- List of districts of Maharashtra
- List of metropolitan areas in India
- List of states and union territories of India by population
