= Banamali Patnaik =

Indian politician (1922–1980)

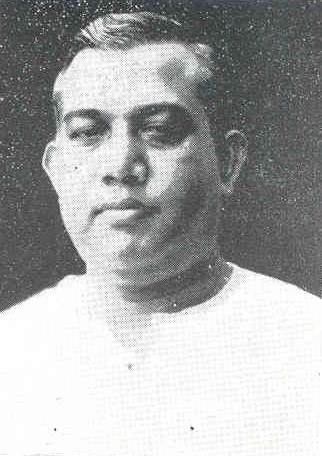
- Banamali Patnaik, Politician from Odisha

Member of Parliament, Lok Sabha
- In office 1971–1977
- Preceded by: Rabi Ray
- Succeeded by: Padmacharan Samantasinhar
- Constituency: Puri, Odisha

Personal details
- Born: 4 April 1922 Mendhasal, Puri district, Odisha, British India
- Died: 1980 (aged 57–58)
- Party: Indian National Congress
- Spouse: Shanti Patnaik

Banamali Patnaik (4 April 1922 – 1980) was an Indian politician. He was elected to the Lok Sabha, the lower house of the Parliament of India as a member of the Indian National Congress. Patnaik died in 1980.
