= Rabi Ray =

Indian socialist politician (1926–2017)

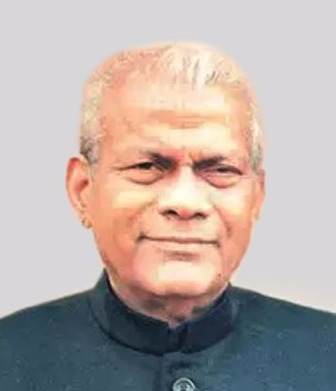
- Portrait of Rabi Ray

9th Speaker of the Lok Sabha
- In office 19 December 1989 – 9 July 1991
- Prime Minister: Vishwanath Pratap Singh; Chandra Sekhar
- Deputy: Shivraj Patil
- Preceded by: Balram Jakhar
- Succeeded by: Shivraj Patil

Minister of Health and Family Welfare
- In office 25 January 1979 – 14 January 1980
- Prime Minister: Morarji Desai
- Preceded by: Raj Narain
- Succeeded by: Mohsina Kidwai

Member of Parliament, Lok Sabha
- In office 1989–1996
- Preceded by: Sarat Kumar Deb
- Succeeded by: Srikant Kumar Jena
- Constituency: Kendrapara, Odisha
- In office 1967–1971
- Preceded by: Bibudhendra Mishra
- Succeeded by: Banamali Patnaik
- Constituency: Puri, Odisha

Member of Parliament, Rajya Sabha
- In office 3 April 1974 – 2 April 1980
- Constituency: Odisha

Personal details
- Born: 26 November 1926 Bhanagarh, Bihar and Orissa Province, British India
- Died: 6 March 2017 (aged 90) Cuttack, Odisha, India
- Party: Janata Dal
- Other political affiliations: Janata Party (Secular), Janata Party, Samyukta Socialist Party, Socialist Party
- Spouse: Dr. Saraswati Swain
- As of 11 July, 2009

Rabi Ray (26 November 1926 – 6 March 2017) was an Indian socialist politician, a Gandhian, a speaker of the Lok Sabha and a former Union minister. He hailed from Odisha. He joined the Socialist Party in 1948, and later became member of the Samyukta Socialist Party, the Janata Party and the Janata Dal.

== Early life ==
Ray was born on 26 November 1926 at Bhanaragarh village in the Puri district of Orissa, He earned his B.A. Honours in History from the Ravenshaw College in Cuttack and later studied law at the Madhusudan Law College in Cuttack. He was married to Dr. Saraswati Swain, a medical doctor, who later became a professor at SCB Medical College, Cuttack. Being a socialist and forward looking, Ray never expected his wife to change her surname after marriage. She stood beside him as a source of inspiration in political career.

== Political career ==
Before joining active politics Rabi Ray was a freedom fighter. In early 1947, when he was studying history in Ravenshaw College, Cuttack, he was arrested by the British Army in connection with the unfurling of the tricolor Indian flag in Ravenshaw College. At the end of the day, the British Government had to give in to students' demands for the unfurling the tricolor Indian flag in educational institutions, though the country was still under foreign rule.

An ardent believer in socialism from his college days, Rabi Ray joined the Socialist Party as its member in 1948. Due to his innate qualities of leadership and his deep commitment to the socialist cause, he always remained at the forefront of the Socialist movement. During 1953–54, he held the post of the Joint Secretary, All India Samajwadi Yuvak Sabha. In 1956, under the leadership of Ram Manohar Lohia, he founded the Socialist Party in Orissa. He was a member of the National Executive of the Socialist Party during that period. Later, in 1960, he became the General Secretary of the party for about a year.

In 1967, he was elected to the 4th Lok Sabha from Puri constituency in Orissa. In the 4th Lok Sabha, he was the leader of the Parliamentary Group of the Samyukta Socialist Party (SSP). In 1974, he was elected to the Rajya Sabha from Orissa and he completed his term in Rajya Sabha in 1980. He was the Union minister of Health and Family Welfare in the Morarji Desai Ministry from January 1979 to January 1980.

In 1989, he was re-elected to the 9th Lok Sabha from the Kendrapara constituency in Orissa as a Janata Dal candidate. On 19 December 1989, he was unanimously elected as the Speaker of the 9th Lok Sabha. In 1991, he was re-elected to the 10th Lok Sabha from the same constituency. Rabi Ray, who was empowered with an inherent simplicity and integrity, added to the prestige and dignity of the office of the Speaker of the Lok Sabha through his unbiased approach.

In 1990, when some Janata Dal MPs left Janata Dal to join Chandra Shekhar, Rabi Ray sent notices to them under Anti-defection law. Cabinet Minister Subramanian Swamy threatened Rabi Ray in his chambers to send him to jail, Swamy was reacting to Ray's unwillingness to give 37 Janata Dal (S) MPs more time to explain why some of them should not be disqualified. But Ray unseated those MPs.

== Later years and social work ==
Since 1997, he was associated with a non-political organisation, Lok Shakti Abhiyaan, and spearheaded a people's movement against corruption in high places, excessive centralisation and a decadent consumerist culture. He toured different parts of the country in furtherance of ensuring probity and transparency in all spheres of public life. He was a member of the Citizens Initiative for Peace, a civil society group, and sought to find a peaceful resolution to the problem of Naxalite–Maoist insurgency in India. He regularly contributed articles on contemporary political and social issues to various leading journals in Oriya, Hindi and English.

== Awards ==
- Light Of Truth, 2002 (Rabi Ray, received the award on behalf of the people of India during the closing ceremony of the Tibetan Festival of Compassion on 18 December 2002.)
- Shanti Doot International Award - the honour is conferred by the World Peace Movement Trust India.
- Kalinga Ratna, 2008

Lok Sabha
Preceded by B. Mishra	Member of Parliament for Puri; 1967 – 1971	Succeeded by Banamali Patnaik
Preceded by Sarat Kumar Deb	Member of Parliament for Kendrapara; 1989 – 1996	Succeeded by Srikant Kumar Jena
Political offices
Preceded by Raj Narain	Minister of Health and Family Welfare; 25 January 1979 – 14 January 1980	Succeeded by Mohsina Kidwai
Preceded by Balram Jakhar	Speaker of the Lok Sabha; 19 December 1989 – 9 July 1991	Succeeded by Shivraj Patil
