= Sunil Gaikwad =

Indian politician

Sunil Baliram Gaikwad

Member of the Indian Parliament for Latur
- In office 16 May 2014 – 23 May 2019
- Preceded by: Jaywant Gangaram Awale
- Succeeded by: Sudhakar Tukaram Shrangare

Personal details
- Born: 19 June 1970 (age 54); Latur, Maharashtra, India
- Political party: Bharatiya Janata Party (BJP)
- Website: official website

Sunil Baliram Gaikwad (born 19 June 1970) is an Indian politician from Bharatiya Janata Party (BJP). He represented Latur, Maharashtra in the 16th Lok Sabha.

== Early life and education ==
Sunil Gaikwad was born to Shri Baliram Gaikwad and his wife Vatsala Gaikwad at Ambulga village of Latur district.

== Political career ==
Gaikwad lost the Latur Lok Sabha seat by around 7000 votes in 2009. He won 2014 Lok Sabha elections from Latur. In 2017, he alleged he was being ill-treated at airports because he shared the same surname as Ravindra Gaikwad, who had assaulted an airline employee. In 2019, BJP replaced him with Sudhakar Shringare.
