= Siddheshwar & Ratneshwar Temple =

Siddheshwar, and Ratneshwar Temple, Latur
- सिद्धेश्वर रत्नेश्वर मंदिर
- Location in Maharashtra

Religion
- Affiliation: Hinduism
- District: Latur
- Deity: Siddheshwar, and Ratneshwar

Location
- Location: Latur
- State: Maharashtra
- Country: India
- Interactive map of Siddheshwar, and Ratneshwar Temple, Latur
- Coordinates: 18.24°N 76.82°E

Architecture
- Type: West Indian
- Creator: Unknown
- Completed: During Tamradwajs reign

Siddheshwar, and Ratneshwar Temple is situated about 2 kilometres (1.2 mi) from Latur City of Maharashtra, India. The temple was built by King Tamradwaj.

There is a fair every year during Mahashivratri.
