= Western India Regional Council =

Professional accountants organization

Western India Regional Council, abbreviated as WIRC of ICAI is one of the five Regional Councils of Institute of Chartered Accountants of India (ICAI) and the largest among them. It is located in Mumbai and serves a membership of more than 85000 Chartered Accountants and circa 225000 CA students, in a network of 32 branches in the three states of Maharashtra, Gujarat, Goa and two Union Territories of Daman and Diu and Dadra and Nagar Haveli.

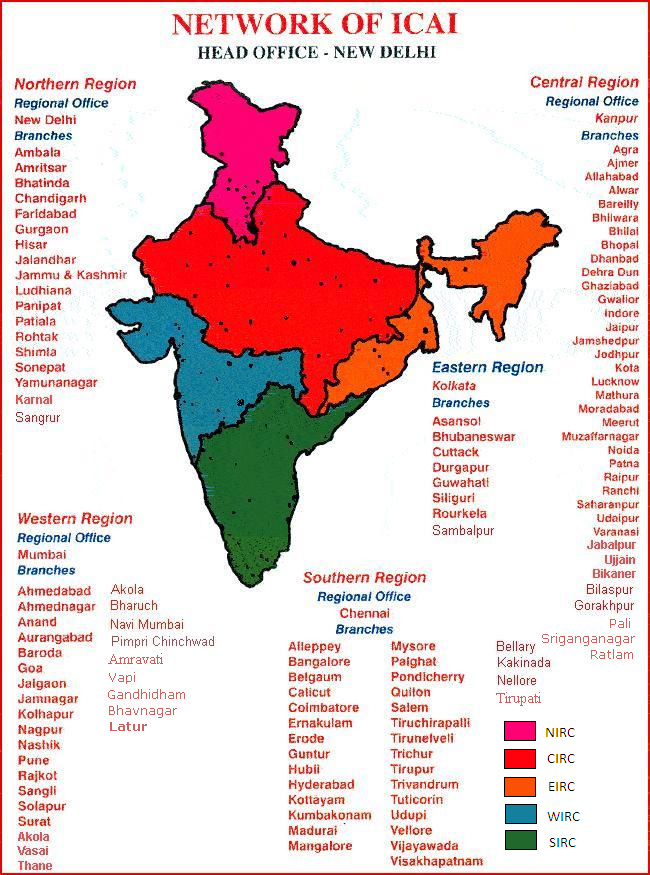
Map of India showing the jurisdictions of the five Regional Councils of ICAI, with WIRC marked in blue.

== Branches ==
In all, WIRC has 32 branches, with the recent most Kalyan-Dombivli branch being formed on 17 January 2016. The main regional office of WIRC is located at Mumbai in Maharashtra.

=== Maharashtra ===
1. Akola
2. Ahmednagar (Est. 2002)
3. Amravati (Est. 27 March 2008)
4. Aurangabad (Est. 17 June 1986)
5. Dhule (Est. 1 June 2013)
6. Kalyan-Dombivali (Est. 17 January 2016)
7. Jalgaon
8. Kolhapur
9. Latur
10. Nagpur
11. Nanded
12. Nashik
13. Navi Mumbai
14. Pimpri-Chinchwad
15. Bandra Kurla Complex (Est. 27 March 2008)
16. Pune
17. Sangli
18. Solapur
19. Thane
20. Vasai

=== Gujarat ===
1. Ahmedabad
2. Anand
3. Bharuch
4. Baroda
5. Bhavnagar
6. Bhuj
7. Gandhidham
8. Jamnagar
9. Navsari
10. Rajkot
11. Surat
12. Vapi

=== Goa ===
1. Goa

== Regional Council members ==
Following is the list of members of WIRC elected for the years 2019-2021

1. CA. Lalit Bajaj - Chairman
2. CA. Vishal P. Doshi - Vice Chairman
3. CA. Murtuza Kachwala - Secretary
4. CA. Jayesh Kala - Treasurer
5. CA. Hitesh Pomal - Chairman [WICASA]
6. CA. Abhijit Kelkar
7. CA. Anand Jakhotiya
8. CA. Arpit Kabra
9. CA. Arun Anandagiri
10. CA. Balkishan Agarwal
11. CA. Chintan Patel
12. CA. Drushti Desai
13. CA. Hitesh Pomal
14. CA. Kamlesh Saboo
15. CA. Manish Gadia
16. CA. Murtuza Kachwala
17. CA. Shilpa Shinagare
18. CA. Sushrut Chitale
19. CA. Vikash Jain
20. CA. Vimal Agrawal
21. CA. Vishal P. Doshi

== Students' Council ==
The students' wing of WIRC is Western India Chartered Accountants Students Association (WICASA). The managing committee consists of 12 members who are Chartered Accountancy course students, pursuing their articleship. Apart from this Committee at regional level, there are separate WICASA Committees at Branch level which are again managed by Chartered Accountancy Students pursuing 'articleship' The Managing Committee at Branch level consists of 7 members.
