= Shivraj Patil =

Indian politician (1935–2025)

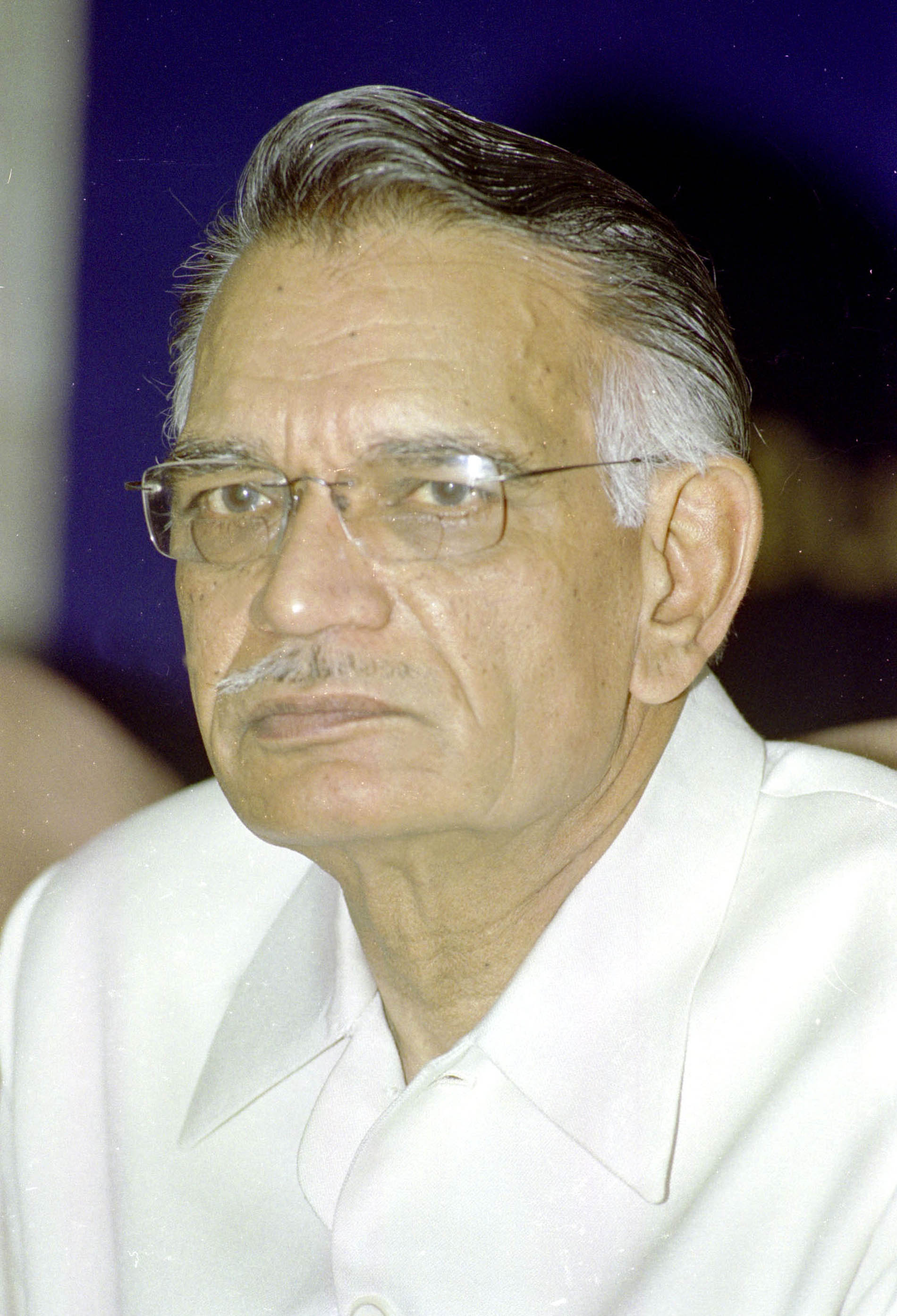
- Patil in 2005

27th Governor of Punjab
- In office 22 January 2010 – 21 January 2015
- President: Pratibha Patil; Pranab Mukherjee
- Chief Minister: Parkash Singh Badal
- Preceded by: Sunith Francis Rodrigues
- Succeeded by: Kaptan Singh Solanki

14th Administrator of Chandigarh
- In office 22 January 2010 – 21 January 2015
- President: Pratibha Patil; Pranab Mukherjee
- Preceded by: Sunith Francis Rodrigues
- Succeeded by: Kaptan Singh Solanki

27th Union Minister of Home Affairs
- In office 22 May 2004 – 30 November 2008
- President: A. P. J. Abdul Kalam; Pratibha Patil
- Prime Minister: Manmohan Singh
- Preceded by: Lal Krishna Advani
- Succeeded by: P. Chidambaram

Governor of Rajasthan
- In office 26 April 2010 – 12 May 2012
- President: A. P. J. Abdul Kalam; Pratibha Patil
- Prime Minister: Manmohan Singh
- Chief Minister of Rajasthan: Ashok Gehlot
- Preceded by: Prabha Rau
- Succeeded by: Margaret Alva

10th Speaker of Lok Sabha
- In office 10 July 1991 – 22 May 1996
- President: Ramaswamy Venkataraman; Shankar Dayal Sharma
- Prime Minister: P. V. Narasimha Rao
- Deputy: S. Mallikarjunaiah
- Leader of the House Lok Sabha: Arjun Singh (Ending 10 July 1991); P. V. Narasimha Rao (Starting 6 December 1991)
- Preceded by: Rabi Ray
- Succeeded by: P.A. Sangma

9th Deputy Speaker of Lok Sabha
- In office 19 March 1990 – 13 March 1991
- President: Ramaswamy Venkataraman
- Prime Minister: Vishwanath Pratap Singh (Ending 10 November 1990); Chandra Shekhar (Starting 10 November 1990)
- Speaker of Lok Sabha: Rabi Ray
- Leader of the House Lok Sabha: Vishwanath Pratap Singh (Ending 10 November 1990); Chandra Shekhar (Starting 10 November 1990)
- Preceded by: M. Thambidurai
- Succeeded by: S. Mallikarjunaiah

Member of Parliament, Lok Sabha
- In office 18 January 1980 – 13 May 2004
- Speaker of Lok Sabha: Balram Jakhar (1980–1989); Rabi Ray (1989–1991); Himself (1991–1996); P. A. Sangma (1996–1998); G. M. C. Balayogi (1998–2002); Manohar Joshi (2002–2004)
- Preceded by: Udhavrao Patil
- Succeeded by: Rupatai Patil Nilangekar
- Constituency: Latur, Maharasthra

15th Union Minister of Civil Aviation and Tourism (India)
- Minister of State Independent Charge
- In office 25 June 1988 – 2 December 1989
- President: Ramaswamy Venkataraman
- Prime Minister: Rajiv Gandhi
- Preceded by: Motilal Vora (Civil Aviation); Mohsina Kidwai (Tourism)
- Succeeded by: Vishwanath Pratap Singh

Union Minister of State (India)
- In office 31 December 1984 – 31 October 1989
- President: Ramaswamy Venkataraman
- Prime Minister: Rajiv Gandhi
- Ministry & Department: Minister of State in the Departments of Science and Technology; Space; Atomic Energy; Electronics; Ocean Development (31 December 1984 – 22 October 1986); Minister of State in the Ministry of Personnel and Training, Public Grievances and Pensions and Administrative Reforms (25 September 1985 – 4 October 1985); Minister of State Ministry of Defence (Defence Production) (22 October 1986 – 25 June 1988)

Union Minister of State (India)
- In office 4 November 1984 – 31 October 1989
- President: Zail Singh
- Prime Minister: Rajiv Gandhi
- Ministry & Department: Minister of State Department of Science and Technology; Minister of State Department of Space; Minister of State Department of Atomic Energy; Minister of State Department of Electronics; Minister of State Department of Ocean Development

Union Minister of State (India)
- In office 19 October 1980 – 31 October 1984
- President: Neelam Sanjiva Reddy; Zail Singh
- Prime Minister: Indira Gandhi
- Ministry & Department: Minister of State Defence (19 October 1980 – 15 January 1982); Minister of State Department of Science and Technology (29 January 1983 – 31 October 1984); Minister of State Department of Electronics (29 January 1983 – 31 October 1984); Minister of State Department of Ocean Development (29 January 1983 – 31 October 1984); Minister of State Department of Atomic Energy (29 January 1983 – 31 October 1984); Minister of State Department of Space (29 January 1983 – 31 October 1984)

Member of Parliament, Rajya Sabha
- In office 5 July 2004 – 22 January 2010
- Chairperson of Rajya Sabha (Vice President of India): Bhairon Singh Shekhawat (2004–2007); Mohammad Hamid Ansari (2007–2010)
- Constituency: Maharashtra

8th Speaker of the House Maharashtra Legislative Assembly
- In office 17 March 1978 – 6 December 1979
- Governor: Sadiq Alo
- Chief Minister: Vasantdada Patil; Sharad Pawar
- Preceded by: Balasaheb Desai
- Succeeded by: Pranlal Vora

5th Deputy Speaker of the House Maharashtra Legislative Assembly
- In office 5 July 1977 – 2 March 1978
- Governor: Sadiq Ali (freedom fighter)
- Chief Minister: Vasantdada Patil
- Preceded by: S. F. P. S. M. Pasha
- Succeeded by: Gajananrao Raghunathrao Garud

Member of Maharashtra Legislative Assembly
- In office 1972–1980
- Preceded by: V.R. Kaldate alias Bapu Kaldate
- Succeeded by: Vilasrao Deshmukh
- Constituency: Latur City

Personal details
- Born: 12 October 1935 Chakur, Hyderabad State, British India (present–day Maharashtra, India)
- Died: 12 December 2025 (aged 90) Latur, Maharashtra, India
- Citizenship: India
- Party: Indian National Congress
- Spouse: Vijayatai S. Patil
- Children: Shailesh Patil (Son), Late. Swapna Basavaprabhu Patil
- Parent: Vishwanath Patil
- Education: Bachelor of science, LLB
- Alma mater: Osmania university, Mumbai university
- Occupation: Politician

Shivraj Vishwanath Patil (12 October 1935 – 12 December 2025) was an Indian politician. He was the Minister of Home Affairs (India), from 2004 to 2008 and 10th Speaker of the Lok Sabha from 1991 to 1996. Patil was Governor of the state of Punjab and Administrator of the Chandigarh from 2010 to 2015. Previously, he served in the Indira Gandhi and Rajiv Gandhi cabinets as Minister of Defence during the 1980s.

Patil resigned from the post of Home Minister on 30 November 2008, following widespread criticism raised after 2008 Mumbai attacks, and took moral responsibility for the security lapse that led to the attacks.

== Early life ==
Shivraj Vishwanath Patil Chakurkar was born on 12 October 1935 in the village of Chakur in Latur district (Marathwada region) of the then princely state of Hyderabad, now Maharashtra, India. He attended Osmania University, Hyderabad, earning a degree in Science and studied law at University of Mumbai. During 1967–69, he was involved in local government (Latur City Municipal Corporation). Keshavrao Sonawane and Manikrao Sonawane helped Shivaraj Patil to get his first break to stand from Latur Constituency.

He belonged to the Panchamsali Lingayats community. He married Vijaya Patil in June 1963, and had two children – a son and a daughter – with her. He was also a follower of Sathya Sai Baba.

== In state politics ==
From 1972 to 1980, Patil was legislator of Latur City of the Maharashtra Legislative Assembly for two terms of 1972 to 1978 and 1978 to 1980 during which time he held various positions such as Chairman of Public Undertakings Committee, Deputy Minister (Law & Judiciary, Irrigation, Protocol), Deputy Speaker of the Assembly and Speaker of the Lok Sabha.

== In central politics ==
In 1980, Patil was elected to the 7th Lok Sabha from Latur Lok Sabha constituency. By 1999, he had won seven successive Lok Sabha elections in 1980, 1984, 1989, 1991, 1996, 1998 and 1999. In the 2004 Indian general election, he lost to Bharatiya Janata Party candidate Rupatai Patil Nilangekar.

== In government ==
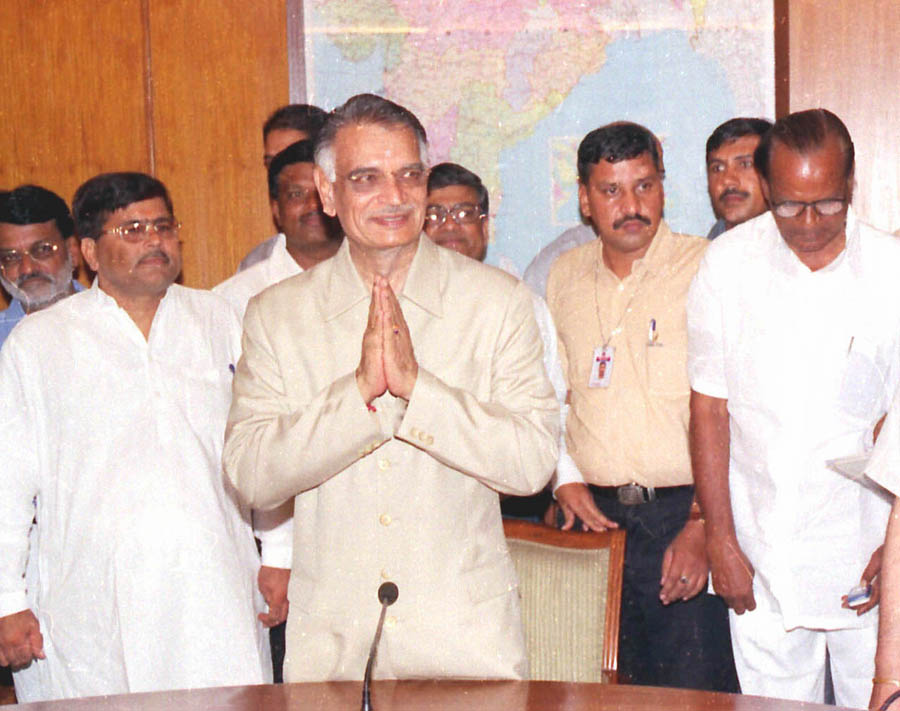
Shivraj Patil in his office after taking over the charge of the Union Minister of Home in New Delhi on 24 May 2004. Seen beside him are political leaders from Maharashtra.

First inducted into the Indira Gandhi-led government as Minister of State for Defence (1980–82), he was given independent charge of the Ministry of Commerce and Industry (1982–83), from where he was shifted to Science and Technology, Atomic energy, Electronics, Space and Ocean Development (1983–84). During 1983–86, he was vice-president of CSIR India. He also served on various committees including those on Defence, External Affairs, Finance, Salaries and Allowances of members of parliament.

In the Rajiv Gandhi government, he was Minister for Personnel, Defence production and later held independent charge of Civil Aviation and Tourism.

Patil also held a number of important positions in the party after Sonia Gandhi took over the presidency of the party. He is largely known for introducing the Outstanding Parliamentarian Award, India in 1992. He was the chairman of the manifesto committee of the party during the 1999 Lok Sabha election.

As speaker of the Lok Sabha, he began or contributed to initiatives on information dissemination to members of the Parliament (through computerisation and modernisation), construction of the Parliament Library Building and the broadcast of Lok Sabha proceedings, including the live broadcast of Question Hour of both houses of the parliament.

Between 1991 and 1995, he was a member/leader of Indian parliamentary delegations to various international parliamentary conferences.

He became Home Minister in 2004. A former Lok Sabha speaker, Shivraj Patil lost in the 2004 polls from Latur in Maharashtra, but still landed the second most important position in the Union Cabinet—that of the Home Minister. He was elected to the Rajya Sabha in July 2004. It is also said if not for losing the election he would have been the Prime Minister, and the reason he lost the election was because his opponent got the sympathy vote for losing a family member who was a mass leader. His tenure as home minister was marred by one debacle after another and he faced increasing calls for his resignation, eventually forcing it due to the mishandling in the events leading up to and after the 2008 Mumbai attacks. Not to be forgotten also are the 2006 Malegaon bombings, at a Muslim graveyard.

United States Ambassador David C. Mulford in an embassy cable described his removal after the Mumbai terrorist attack as inevitable and called him "inept" and "asleep on the watch".

Patil was accused of not sending the Central Reserve Police Force to Nandigram, even after repeated requests by the Government of West Bengal, to restore law and order in the area and the events resulted in police firing upon and killing men and women in Nandigram.

Patil's name was considered a likely candidate in the 2007 Indian presidential election. However, after the Left opposed his candidacy, Sonia Gandhi proposed Pratibha Patil, Governor of Rajasthan, as the presidential candidate. Shivraj Patil was later considered a possible candidate for the post of Vice President of India.

On 30 November 2008, just four days after the Bombay blasts, Patil resigned from his position of Home Minister in Union Cabinet taking moral responsibility for the security lapse that led to the 2008 Mumbai attacks.

After 26/11, Shivraj Patil was made the Punjab Governor and Chandigarh Administrator from 2010 to 2015.

== Controversies ==
Patil has been criticized for his response to the 2008 Mumbai attacks, as well as for not mentioning them in his 2014 autobiography.

== Death ==
Patil died in Latur, Maharashtra, India on 12 December 2025, at the age of 90.

Preceded by Pranab Mukherjee	Minister of Defence; 15 January 1980 – 2 December 1989	Succeeded by Shankarao Chavan
Preceded by Rabi Ray	Speaker of Lok Sabha; 1991–1996	Succeeded by P.A.Sangma
Preceded by L.K. Advani	Home Minister of India; 2004–2008	Succeeded by P. Chidambaram
Preceded by Sunith Francis Rodrigues	Governor of Punjab & Administrator of Chandigarh; January 2010 – January 2015	Succeeded by Kaptan Singh Solanki
