= Shivaji Kalge =

Indian politician

Dr. Shivaji Kalge

Member of Parliament, Lok Sabha
- Incumbent
- Assumed office 24 June 2024
- Preceded by: Sudhakar Tukaram Shrangare
- Constituency: Latur, Maharashtra

Personal details
- Party: Indian National Congress
- Occupation: Politician

Dr. Shivaji Bandappa Kalge is an Indian politician and Member of Parliament in the Lok Sabha from Latur Lok Sabha constituency, Maharashtra. He is a member of the Indian National Congress.

== See also ==
- 18th Lok Sabha
- Indian National Congress
