= 1987 elections in India =

Elections in India
- 1987

Elections in the Republic of India in 1987 included elections to six state legislative assemblies, seats in the Rajya Sabha and the posts of President and vice president.

== Results ==
Date(s)	State	Government before election	Chief Minister before election	Government after election	Chief Minister after election	Maps
16 February 1987	Mizoram	Mizo National Front	Laldenga	Mizo National Front	Laldenga	
23 March 1987	Jammu and Kashmir	Jammu and Kashmir National Conference	Farooq Abdullah	Jammu and Kashmir National Conference	Farooq Abdullah	
23 March 1987	Kerala	Indian National Congress	K. Karunakaran	Communist Party of India (Marxist)	E. K. Nayanar	
10 April 1987	West Bengal	Communist Party of India (Marxist)	Jyoti Basu	Communist Party of India (Marxist)	Jyoti Basu	
17 June 1987	Haryana	Indian National Congress	Bansi Lal	Lok Dal	Devi Lal	
18 November 1987	Nagaland	Indian National Congress	Hokishe Sema	Indian National Congress	Hokishe Sema	

== Legislative Assembly elections ==
=== Haryana ===
Summary of results of the Haryana Legislative Assembly election, 1987
Political Party	No. of candidates	No. of elected	Number of Votes	% of Votes
Lok Dal	69	60	2,349,397	38.58%
Bharatiya Janata Party	20	16	613,819	10.08%
Indian National Congress	0	5	1,776,820	29.18%
Communist Party of India (Marxist)	4	1	47,434	0.78%
Communist Party of India	5	1	32,738	0.54%
Independents	1045	7	1,128,803	18.54%
Total	1322	90	6,089,130	

=== Jammu and Kashmir ===
Party	Votes	%	Seats	+/–
Jammu & Kashmir National Conference	857,830	32.98	40	▼6
Indian National Congress	525,261	20.20	26	0
Bharatiya Janata Party	132,528	5.10	2	New
Others	181,175	6.97	0	0
Independents	903,971	34.76	8	▲6
Total	2,600,765	100.00	76	▲1
Valid votes	2,600,765	97.69		
Invalid/blank votes	61,590	2.31		
Total votes	2,662,355	100.00		
Registered voters/turnout	3,555,549	74.88		
Source: ECI

=== Kerala ===
Party Wise Results
Party	Seats
Communist Party of India (CPI)	16
Communist Party of Indian (Marxist) (CPM)	38
Indian Congress (Socialist-Sarat Chandra Sinha) ICS(SCS)	6
Indian National Congress (INC)	33
Janta Party (JNP)	7
Lok Dal (LKD)	1
Kerala Congress (KEC)	5
Indian Union Muslim League (IUML)	15
Revolutionary Socialist Party (RSP)	5
Independent (IND)	14
Total	140

=== Mizoram ===
Party	Votes	%	Seats	+/–
Independents (Note: Independents included the winning Mizo National Front candidates)	99,996	43.31	24	▲22
Indian National Congress	76,152	32.99	13	▼7
Mizoram People's Conference	54,717	23.70	3	▼5
Total	230,865	100.00	40	▲10
Valid votes	230,865	98.85		
Invalid/blank votes	2,691	1.15		
Total votes	233,556	100.00		
Registered voters/turnout	322,066	72.52		
Source: ECI

=== Nagaland ===
Party	Votes	%	Seats	+/–
Indian National Congress	193,199	36.10	34	+10
Naga National Democratic Party	140,112	26.18	18	–6
Nagaland Peoples Front	43,782	8.18	1	New
Bharatiya Janata Party	926	0.17	0	New
Independents	157,173	29.37	7	–5
Total	535,192	100.00	60	0
Valid votes	535,192	98.71		
Invalid/blank votes	6,980	1.29		
Total votes	542,172	100.00		
Registered voters/turnout	581,953	93.16		
Source: ECI

=== West Bengal ===
Party		Candidates	Seats	Votes	%
Left Front	Communist Party of India (Marxist)	212	187	10,285,723	39.12
Left Front	All India Forward Bloc	34	26	1,534,795	5.84
Left Front	Revolutionary Socialist Party	23	18	1,036,138	3.94
Left Front	Communist Party of India	12	11	503,854	1.92
Left Front	Revolutionary Communist Party of India	3	1	118,985	0.42
Left Front	Marxist Forward Bloc	2	2	107,732	0.41
Left Front	Biplobi Bangla Congress	1	0	42,261	0.16
Left Front	West Bengal Socialist Party and Democratic Socialist Party (Prabodh Chandra)	7	6	288,915	1.10
Indian National Congress (I)		294	40	10,989,520	41.81
Socialist Unity Centre of India		46	2	237,674	0.90
Indian Union Muslim League		36	1	162,850	0.62
Bharatiya Janata Party		57	0	134,867	0.51
Janata Party		30	0	41,475	0.16
Lok Dal		18	0	10,032	0.04
Indian Congress (Socialist-Sarat Chandra Sinha)		4	0	3,335	0.01
Independents		718	0	784,937	2.99
Total		1,497	294	26,283,093	100
Source:ECI

== President ==
Candidate	Electoral Values
R. Venkataraman	740,148
V. R. Krishna Iyer	281,550
Mithilesh Kumar	2,223
Total	1,023,921
