= Sambhaji Raje =

Indian politician

Yuvraj Sambhajiraje Chhatrapati
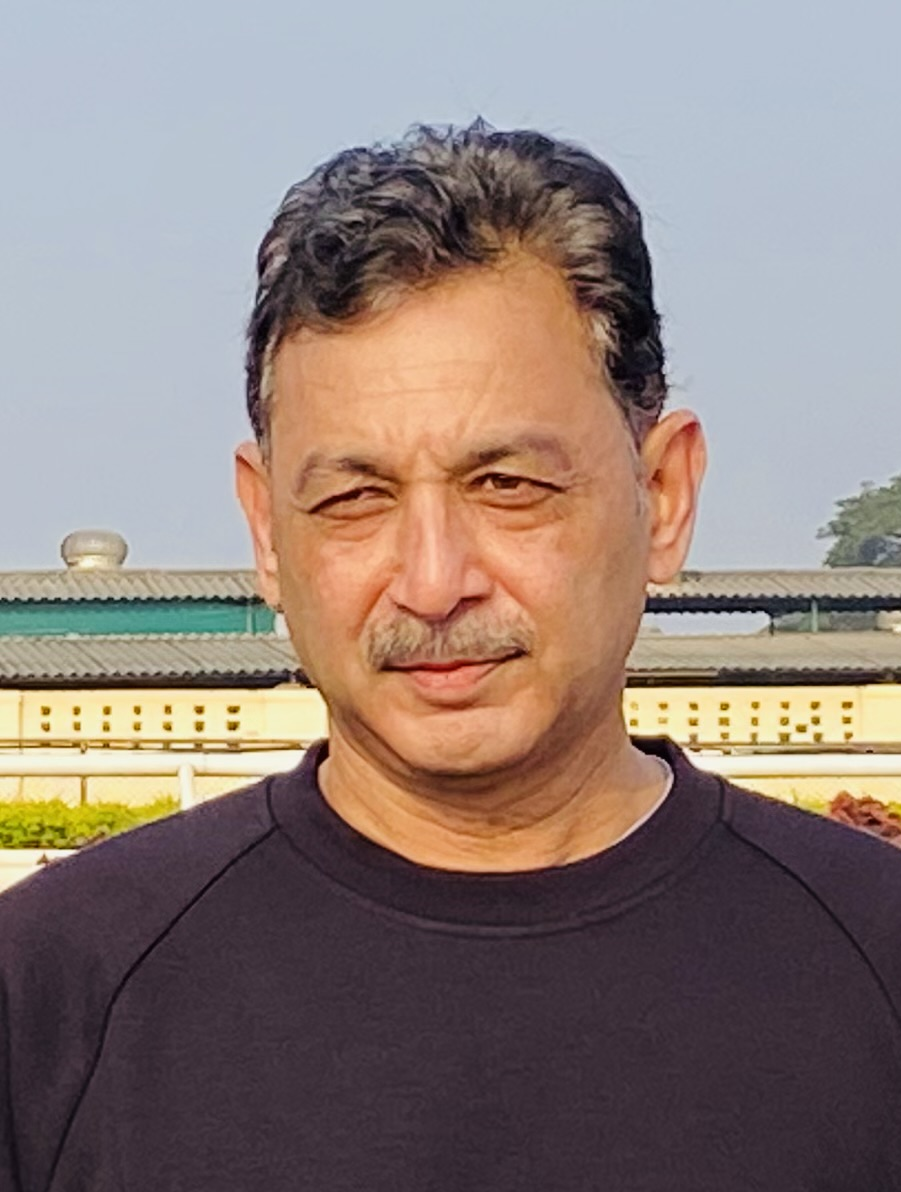
- Raje in 2024

Member of Parliament, Rajya Sabha
- In office 13 June 2016 – 3 May 2022

Personal details
- Born: Sambhajiraje Chhatrapati; 11 February 1971 (age 55)
- Party: Maharashtra Swarajya Party
- Other political affiliations: Nationalist Congress Party; Indian National Congress
- Spouse: Sanyogeetaraje Chhatrapati
- Children: Shahajiraje Chhatrapati
- Parents: Shahu Shahaji Chhatrapati; Yadnaseniiraje Shahu Chhatrapati
- Education: Rajkumar College, Rajkot (Master of Business Administration); Shivaji University, Kolhapur
- Occupation: Agriculturist; Social worker; Politician

Yuvraj Sambhajiraje Shahu Chhatrapati (born 11 February 1971) is an Indian politician, who served as the member in the upper house of the Parliament of India. He is heir to Kolhapur royal family as the 13th direct descendant of the Maratha king, Chhatrapati Shivaji Maharaj and great-great-grandson of Rajarshi Chhatrapati Shahu of Kolhapur.

Low profile and soft-spoken, he was the face of Maratha protest for reservation in 2011–19 before Manoj Jarange took over. He is currently an independent politician.

On 11 June 2016, he was nominated to the Rajya Sabha by then-President of India, Pranab Mukherjee.

On 12 May 2022, he founded Maharashtra Swarajya Party, a social organisation.

In July 2024, he, along with hundreds of his supporters, staged a march to the Vishalgad Fort. Violence broke out in Gajapur village, 3 km away from the fort, where his followers vandalized and ransacked several properties belonging to Muslim families.

== Personal life ==
He is married to Sanyogeeta Raje Bhosale.

== Controversies ==
=== Vishalgad violence ===
On 14 July 2024, Former MP along with hundreds of his supporters staged a march to the Vishalgad Fort where he had given a public call to end encroachments, which has a historical background. After that, devotees vandalized many encroachments at Vishalgad. Also, this movement had taken a violent turn.

Over a month ago, former MP Sambhaji Raje Chhatrapati launched a campaign demanding an encroachment-free Vishalgad in Maharashtra. A foot march to the fort, built on a hilltop in the Sahyadri ranges, was planned well in advance. Several right-wing groups had also given a call and joined Sambhaji Raje's clarion call of chalo Vishalgad on 14 July.

Before Sambhaji Raje and his supporters reached the Vishalgad fort, violence broke out in nearby villages including Gajapur village, located around three kilometres away from the base of the fort. A mob, screaming 'Jai Bhavani', 'Jai Shivaji' and 'Jai Shri Ram', entered Gajapur village and ransacked properties belonging to Muslim families.

Besides ransacking and damaging the physical structure of the house, the group also looted money and gold jewellery, according witness accounts. The attack went on for many hours. The men, wearing saffron gamchas and wielding axes and bamboo sticks, entered the village and ransacked only those houses that belonged to the Muslim community.

One of the attackers videographed the event. Among the videos of the attack, was of a village mosque being attacked from both the inside and the outside. The video, showing men climbing on the mosque and trying to damage its dome had gone viral. Over 50 men had entered the mosque and damaged the structure internally. The protestors were all armed; they carried swords and axes, but were not apprehended by the police. A few policemen can be seen unsuccessfully chasing the unruly mob away.

The mob allegedly also attacked a few policemen, and at least one of them suffered injuries on his shoulder following an attack with an alleged sword. Several local journalists reporting on the incident alleged that they were threatened by people who were a part of the mob with knives and sticks to stop them from reporting omn the incident. Many claimed that their equipment, mobile phones, and boom mic were snatched by miscreants while brandishing swords and knives. Some also claimed that their vehicles were chased in order to scare them into not coming to the area.

Following this the Kolhapur police on Monday lodged a case against over 500 persons including former Rajya Sabha MP in connection with disruptions during the call to free historic Vishalgad fort from encroachment in Kolhapur district a day before.The police have detained 21 persons and also booked Ravindra Padwal and Banda Salokhe in connection with the vandalism and violence.

The violence left 6 civilians and 12 policemen injured while houses were set on fire and around eight to ten cars and over two dozen two-wheelers were damaged by the protestors, police said.

Reacting to the development, SP Pandit said, "The anti-encroachment drive is stayed in the court and no permission was given for any gathering. We have lodged a case against those who engaged in violence and ransacked a religious structure, set houses on fire, and damaged two and four-wheelers and shops. We are assessing the damage and trying to find more suspects based on social media reels and videos captured by the policemen."
