= Ghatboral =

Ghatboral Ghatboral
- village
- Nickname: Ghatboral
- Location in Karnataka, India Ghatboral (India)
- Coordinates: 17.77°N 77.14°E
- Country: India
- State: Karnataka
- District: Bidar
- Talukas: Homnabad

Government
  - Body: Panchayat of Ghatboral

Area
  - Total: 32.78 km^{2} (12.66 sq mi)

Population (2011)
  - Total: 9,067
  - Density: 277/km^{2} (720/sq mi)
- Demonym: Ghatboralkar

Languages
  - Official: Kannada
  - Other: Marathi Hindi Telugu
- Time zone: UTC+5:30 (IST)
- PIN CODE: 585418
- Vehicle registration: KA

Ghatboral is a village in the southern state of Karnataka, India. It is located in the Homnabad taluk of Bidar district.It is 20km from Humnabad.

== Demographics ==
As of 2001 India census, Ghatboral had a population of 7735 with 4037 males and 3698 females. The village has a historic temple, Shankarling Temple, and many other small temples. The surrounding nearby villages and its distance from Ghatboral are Ghodwadi 5.3 km, Kankatta 6.8 km, Chandanhalli 6.9 km, Sedol 8.7 km, Sultanabad 9.8 km, Maniknagar 12.5 km, Dubulgundi 13.3 km, Humnabad 15.0 km, Benchincholi 17.7 km, Hudgi 18.2 km, Madargaon 18.5 km, Hallikhed B 20.9 km, Sitalgera 23.8 km, Hallikhed ( K) 24.0 km, Dakulgi 24.6 km, Belkera 25.2 km, Talmadgi 26.2 km, Mangalgi 28.9 km, Kodambal, Mustari, Nirna, Udbal, Mutangi, Meenkera, Bemalkheda, Kallur, Itga.

== Gram Panchayat ==
Ghatboral Grama Panchayat is located in Humnabad taluk of Bidar District. Ghatboral is at a distance of 20 km from the Taluk headquarters and 60 km from the district headquarters.The total geographical area of the GP is 3240 hectares. Ghatboral has only one revenue village called Ghatboral under its jurisdiction and has 4 Thandas and a sub village. Ghatboral Gram Panchayat has one private school, which was started in the year 1952. This has led to many persons from the GP pursuing education and there are among them today many doctors and engineers working in various parts of the world. The gram panchayat also has 3 lower primary schools, 3 higher primary schools, 1 high school and 11 anganwadies.

== See also ==
- Bidar
- Districts of Karnataka
