= Vasantrao More =

Indian politician

Vasantrao More (More Kaka)

MP
- Succeeded by: See Raver constituency
- Constituency: Erandol

Personal details
- Born: 1 April 1947 (age 79) Tehu-Parola-Jalgaon, Maharashtra
- Party: NCP
- As of 25 September, 2008

Advocate Vasnatrao J More (born 1 April 1947) is a member of the 14th Lok Sabha of India. He represents the Erandol constituency of Maharashtra and is a member of the Nationalist Congress Party (NCP) political party.
