= Jaywantrao Awale =

Indian politician (born 1940)

Jaywant Gangaram Awale

MP
- Preceded by: Rupatai Patil Nilangekar
- Succeeded by: Sunil Gaikwad
- Constituency: Latur
- In office 2009–2014

Minister of Social Justice, Government of Maharashtra
- In office 1999–2004
- Succeeded by: Chandrakant Handore
- Constituency: Vadgaon

Personal details
- Born: 6 July 1940 (age 85) Ichalkaranji
- Party: Indian National Congress
- Education: Higher Secondary
- Profession: Farmer, businessperson

Jaywant Gangaram Awale (born 6 July 1940, Ichalkaranji) was a member of the 15th Lok Sabha of India. He represented Latur constituency of Maharashtra and is a member of the Indian National Congress political party.

== Political career ==
He started his political career in Ichalkaranji. He served as an M.L.A. for five times in the Maharashtra Legislative Assembly from Vadgaon Vidhan Sabha Constituency from 1980–2004, winning elections in 1980, 1985, 1990, 1995 and 1999. He was made Minister of Social Justice in November 1999 in the Vilasrao Deshmukh government. Awale is also serving as a member of Maharashtra State Co-Operative Bank and President of INC Maharashtra .

Preceded by Rupatai Patil Nilangekar	15th Lok Sabha; 16 May 2009 - 19 May 2014	Succeeded by Sunil Gaikwad
