= Kanta Nalawade =

Indian politician

Kanta Nalawade was a member of Maharashtra Legislative Council and a member of Bharatiya Janata Party. She is Vice President of the state unit of the party and a member of national working committee. She started her career as a party worker in the Jan Sangh together with her husband Jaisinghrao Nalawade and became the BJP's national secretary in 2000. She comes from a farmers' family in Arale village in Satara.
