= Sambhaji Patil Nilangekar =

Indian politician

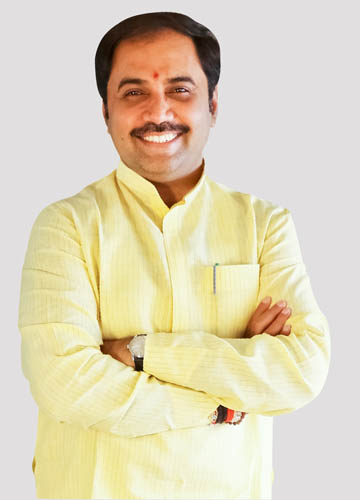

Minister of Food, Civil Supplies & Consumer Protection Government of Maharashtra
- In office 16 June 2019 – 12 November 2019
- Chief Minister: Devendra Fadnavis
- Preceded by: Girish Bapat
- Succeeded by: Chhagan Bhujbal

Minister of Labour Government of Maharashtra
- In office 8 July 2016 – 16 June 2019
- Chief Minister: Devendra Fadnavis
- Succeeded by: Sanjay Shriram Kute

Member of the Maharashtra Legislative Assembly
- Incumbent
- Assumed office 2014
- Preceded by: Shivajirao Patil Nilangekar
- Constituency: Nilanga
- In office 2004–2009
- Preceded by: Shivajirao Patil Nilangekar
- Succeeded by: Shivajirao Patil Nilangekar
- Constituency: Nilanga

Personal details
- Born: 20 June 1977 (age 48) Nilanga, Maharashtra, India
- Party: Bharatiya Janata Party
- Spouse: Prerana Nilangekar
- Relations: Shivajirao Patil Nilangekar (Grandfather)
- Children: Vaishnavi (Daughter), Rajveer (Son)
- Parent(s): Diliprao S. Patil, Rupatai Patil Nilangekar
- Website: www.sambhajipatilnilangekar.com

Sambhaji Patil Nilangekar (born 20 June 1977) is an Indian politician from Bharatiya Janata Party (BJP) currently representing Nilanga constituency, Maharashtra as Member of Maharashtra Legislative Assembly.

He had represented Nilanga (VidhanSabha constituency) in 2004, 2014 and 2019. Patil Nilangekar has previously served as a Cabinet Minister in the government of Maharashtra. He was also guardian minister of Latur District.

== political career ==
Patil Nilangekar is the leader of the Bharatiya Janata Party in Latur district. On entering politics at a young age, he became the youngest MLA in Marathwada (27 years old) when he won Nilanga vidhansabha constituency in 2004.

He was instrumental in steering and nurturing the Bharatiya Janata Party in Latur district, and played a key role in the Bharatiya Janata Party's victory in the 2017 Latur Municipal Corporation elections.

== Railway bogie factory : Transforming Marathwada ==
The problem of unemployment is becoming serious in Marathwada. That is why he followed up with the then Railway Minister Piyush Goyal and Chief Minister Devendra Fadnavis and got the Railway Bogie factory approved. Being largest factory of the Central Government in Marathwada, this will be of great help in developing the industrial sector in Marathwada. The factory will also manufacture air-conditioned bogies for the metro which will provide employment to thousands of young people. The foundation ceremony was held on 31 March 2018 by the then Chief Minister Devendra Fadnavis, and Railway Minister Piyush Goyal. The 150.54 hectare project of railway bogie factory started on 12 October. The first phase railway bogie factory aims to produce 250 bogies a year, while the second phase aims to build 400 bogies a year.The first coach shell is completed on the target date, i.e. 25 December 2020.
