= Umarga taluka =

- Tehsil
- Location in Maharashtra, India
- Coordinates: 17°53′N 076°38′E
- Country: India
- State: Maharashtra
- District: Osmanabad

Area
  - Total: 984 km^{2} (380 sq mi)

Population (2011)
  - Total: 269,849
  - Density: 274/km^{2} (710/sq mi)

Languages
  - Official: Marathi
- Time zone: UTC+5:30 (IST)
- Lok Sabha constituency: Osmanabad
- Vidhan Sabha constituency: Umarga

Umarga (Omerga) Tehsil is a tehsil/ taluka/ subdistrict in Osmanabad district, Maharashtra on the Deccan Plateau of India. The town of Umarga is the administrative headquarters of the tehsil. There are 79 panchayat villages in Umarga Tehsil.

== History ==
The Killari earthquake of 1993 affected most parts of the Umarga Tehsil. Approximately 2,500–3,000 lives were lost.

== Geography ==
Umarga Taluka is located in the southwestern corner of Osmanabad District. It is bounded to the southeast and south by the state of Karnataka, to the southwest by the Solapur District talukas of Akkalkot and Tuljapur, to the west and northwest by Osmanabad's Lohara Taluka, and to the northeast by Nilanga Taluka of Latur District.

== Demographics ==
Religions in Umarga
Religion	Percent
Hindus	76%
Muslims	10%
Buddhists	9.6%
Christians	0.4%
Jains	3.7%
Others†	0.3%
Distribution of religions †Includes Sikhs (0.2%), Buddhists (<0.2%).

In the 2001 Indian census, Umarga Taluka had a population of 241,339, with 123,852 (51.3%) males and 117,487 (48.7%) females, for a gender ratio of 949 females per thousand males. The tehsil was 80.4% rural in 2001.

In the 2011 census, Umarga Tehsil had 269,849 inhabitants and a gender ratio of 946 females per thousand males. The tehsil was 74.5% rural. The literacy rate in 2011 was 75.28% overall in Umarga Tehsil, with a rate of 84.73% for males and 65.35% for females. In 2011 in Umarga Tehsil, 11.7% of the population was 0 to 6 years of age.

According to 1951 census, Umarga Taluka had 60% Marathi, 26.25% Kannada and remaining other languages speakers.

Marathi is the most commonly used language in Umarga, with around 71% speaking Marathi as their primary language. Kannada is the second most spoken language, with around 18% of the people speaking it.

== Transportation ==
National Highways
Below National Highways passes through the Umarga Tehsil.

1. NH-65: Pune-Indapur-Solapur-Umarga-Hyderabad-Vijayawada-Machilipatnam(Andhra Pradesh)
(Villages from Umarga tehsil on this NH are- Yenegur-Dalimb-Yeli-Jakekur-Umarga-Turori)

2. NH-548B: Mantha-Selu-Pathari-Sonpeth-Parali-Ambajogai-Latur-Ausa-Umarga-Yenegur-Murum-Alur-Akkalkot-Nagansur-Vijayapura-Athani-Chikhodi-Sankeshwar-Gotur(Karnataka)

== Towns and villages ==
There are two towns in Umarga Tehsil, Umarga and Murum, both of which have municipal councils. Among the villages in the tehsil are:

- Acharya Tanda
- Alur
- Ambarnagar
- Ashta Jahangir
- Aurad
- Babalsur
- Balsur
- Baradwadi
- Belamb
- Bendga
- Bhagatwadi
- Bhikar Sangvi
- Bhusani
- Bori
- Chandkal
- Chinchkota
- Chincholi Bhuyar
- Chincholi Jahagir
- Chirewadi
- Dabka
- Dalimb
- Dawal Malikwadi
- Dhaktiwadi
- Dhanora Dagad
- Diggi
- Dudhanal
- Ekundi Jahagir
- Ekundiwadi
- Ekurga
- Ekurgawadi
- Fulsingnagar
- Ganeshnagar
- Gugalgaon
- Gunjoti
- Gunjotiwadi
- Guruwadi
- Handral
- Hippargarao
- Ingole Tanda
- Jagadalwadi
- Jakekur
- Jakekurwadi
- Jawalga Bet
- Kadamapur
- Kaddora
- Kader
- Kaldeo Nimbala (Kaldev Nimbala)
- Kalnimbala
- Kantekur
- Karali
- Kasgi
- Kasgiwadi
- Katewadi
- Kawatha
- Kesar Jawalga
- Kolewadi
- Kolsur (G)
- Kolsur (K)
- Koral
- Koregaon
- Koregaonwadi
- Kothali
- Kunhali
- Madaj
- Mahalingraiwadi
- Malgi
- Malgiwadi
- Manegopal
- Matola Kh.
- Mulaj
- Murli
- Murum (Rural)
- Nagral
- Nai Chakur
- Naiknagar
- Narangwadi
- Palasgaon
- Paraskheda
- Peth Sangvi
- Rampur
- Samudral
- Sawalsur
- Sundarwadi
- Supatgaon
- Talmod
- Thorliwadi
- Trikoli
- Tugaon
- Turori
- Umarga (Rural)
- Varnalwadi
- Vhantal
- Wagdari
- Yeli
- Yenegur
