= Yenegur =

Village in Maharashtra

- Village
- Location in Maharashtra, India Yenegur (India)
- Coordinates: 17°51′12.0″N 76°26′22.2″E
- Country: India
- State: Maharashtra
- Region: Marathwada
- District: Osmanabad
- Tehsil/Taluka: Omerga

Government
  - Type: State Government & Central Government
  - Body: Village Panchayat

Population (2011)
  - Total: 6,747

Languages
  - Official: Marathi
- Time zone: UTC+5:30 (IST)
- PIN: 413604
- Telephone code: (+91) 2475
- ISO 3166 code: IN-MH
- Vehicle registration: MH 25
- Lok Sabha Constituency: Osmanabad
- Vidhan Sabha Constituency: Omerga
- Website: https://osmanabad.gov.in/

Yenegur is a major village located in Omerga tehsil of Osmanabad district, which is part of the Marathwada region of the state of Maharashtra in India.

The geographical coordinates i.e. latitude and longitude of Yenegur is 17°51'12.0"N and 76°26'22.2"E respectively.

The Benitura river is a tributary of the Bhima river rises on the slopes of Deobet hill and flows in a South westerly direction passing by villages Jevali, Yenegur and Murum.

There is a Math in the village known as Karibasaveshwar Math.

Yenegur is famous for a market centre for a trade of livestock. Every monday falls a weekly bazaar for foodgrain, cloth, vegetable and livestock.

== Demographics ==
According to the 2011 census, Yenegur had a population of 6,747., out of which 3,409 are males and 3,338 are females. Total 4,656 literate people, out of which 2,552 are male and 2,104 are female.

Marathi is the native and most widely spoken language of the village. Urdu is also spoken by some people.

== Education ==
Village has one higher secondary school with junior college, one ZP (District Administrated) primary school. Also few private English nursery schools have been started.

== Health Services ==
Village has one Primary Health Center (PHC), and few private clinics have also been there in operation.

== History ==
Yenegur was the part of the Hyderabad State as Osmanabad District was ruled by Nizam till 27 September 1948. Then Hyderabad State was merged with independent India and the Osmanabad District became a part of the Mumbai State. It became a part of Maharashtra State when the State was formed on 1 May 1960.

=== Earthquake ===
Yenegur had intraplate earthquake on 30 September 1993, which is known as Killari Earthquake. The earthquake measured 6.3 on the Richter magnitude scale. There were 52 villages demolished and approximately 10,000 people died from Omerga and Ausa tehsils from Osmanabad and Latur districts respectively. Resettlement has been done for the villages.

== Transportation ==
Yenegur is well connected by roads. All time Maharashtra State Road Transport Corporation buses are available to reach the village.

Pune-Indapur-Solapur-Omerga-Hyderabad-Vijayawada-Machilipatnam(Andhra Pradesh) National Highway NH-65 passes through the Yenegur.

New National Highway NH-548B Mantha-Selu-Pathari-Sonpeth-Parali-Ambajogai-Latur-Ausa-Omerga-Yenegur-Murum-Alur-Akkalkot-Nagansur-Vijayapura-Athani-Chikhodi-Sankeshwar-Gotur(Karnataka) passes nearby Yenegur.

Yenegur is not connected by railway. The nearest railway station is Solapur.

=== Nearby Cities ===
Omerga- 20 Km, Osmanabad- 74 Km, Tuljapur- 52 Km, Naldurg- 20 Km, Solapur- 65 Km, Akkalkot- 60 Km, Aurangabad- 312 Km, Pune- 315 Km, Hyderabad- 247 km.
