= Murli, Osmanabad =

Village in Maharashtra

Murli
- Village
- Interactive map of Murli
- Country: India
- State: Maharashtra

Murli is a village in Maharashtra, India. It is located in Umarga Taluka in Osmanabad district. The village resides in the Marathwada region, and falls under the supervision of the Aurangabad division. Located 79 km towards east from the district headquarters Osmanabad, the village is also 12 km from Umarga and 481 km from the state capital Mumbai.

== Demographics ==
The main language spoken here is Marathi. According to the 2011 Census, the total population of Murli village is 1289 and number of houses are 291. The population of female citizens is 48% and the rate of female literacy is 30%. Muslims make up majority of the religious population in Murli village.

== Nearby villages ==
- Kader is 4 km away
- Bhusni is 4 km away
- Naik nagar is 7 km away
- Kothali is 5 km away

Murli is surrounded by Åland taluka towards south, Lohara taluka towards north, Nilanga taluka towards south, Basavakalyan taluka towards east.

== Nearby cities ==
The cities near to Murli are Umarga, Tuljapur, Nilanga, Solapur.

== Postal details ==
The postal head office for Murli is Murum. The pin code of Murli is 413605.

== Politics ==
The National Congress Party (NCP), Shiv Sena, SHS and INC are the major political parties in Murli.

=== Polling stations near Murli ===
1. Z.P.P.S Mulaj Tanda
2. Z.P.P.S Anandnagar
3. Z.P.P.S Kanegav west side
4. Z.P.P.S Kanthekur east side
5. Junior college Gunjoti south side

== Education ==
The colleges near Murli are:

1. Shri Sharadchandraji Pawar Junior college Naichakur
2. National Backward Agriculture Education Information Technology Osmanabad
3. Sevagram college
4. Sevagram college, Kawatha

The schools in Murli are:

1. Z.P.P.S school, Umarga
