= National Highway 548B (India) =

National highway in India

National Highway 548B
- Map of National Highway 548B in red

Route information
- Auxiliary route of NH 48
- Length: 491 km (305 mi)

Major junctions
- North end: Mantha
- South end: Sankeshwar - Gotur

Location
- Country: India
- States: Maharashtra: 404.02 km; Karnataka: 168.90 km
- Primary destinations: Ambajogai - Latur - Ausa - Omerga - Akkalkot - Vijayapura

Highway system
- Roads in India; Expressways; National; State; Asian
← NH 548C	→ NH 48

National Highway 548B, commonly referred to as NH 548B is a national highway in India. It is a spur road of National Highway 48. NH-548B traverses the states of Maharashtra and Karnataka in India.

== Route ==
The NH 548B passes through below cities and towns, in the order of travel from Mantha to Vijayapura, Sankeshwar:

Maharashtra(404.02 KM)

- Mantha (Jalna District)
- Deogoan Fata
- Selu
- Pathari
- Sonpeth
- Parali Vaijnath
- Ambajogai
- Renapur Phata
- Latur
- Ausa
- Omerga
- Yenegur
- Murum
- Alur
- Akkalkot
- Nagansur to Mashal

Karnataka(168.90 KM)

- Mashal
- Mannur
- Indi
- Vijayapura
- Tikota
- Athani
- Kagwad
- Chikodi
- Sankeshwar

== Junctions ==
NH 548C Terminal near Mantha.
NH 63 near Renapur, Latur
NH 361 near Latur.
NH 65 near Omerga.
NH 65 near Yenegur.

NH 150E near Akkalkot.

NH 52 near Bijapur.

NH 166E near Tikota.

NH 160 near Kagwad.
NH 48 Terminal near Sankeshwar - Gotur.

NH 61 near Pathri.

== See also ==
- List of national highways in India
- List of national highways in India by state
