= Belamb =

Village in Maharashtra

- Village
- Interactive map of Belamb
- Country: India
- State: Maharashtra

Belamb is a village in Maharashtra, India. It is located in Umarga Taluka in Osmanabad district. The village resides in the Marathwada region, and falls under the supervision of the Aurangabad division. Located 78 km towards south from the district headquarters Osmanabad, the village is also 20 km from Umarga and 477 km from the state capital Mumbai.

== Demographics ==
According to the 2011 Indian census, the village of Belamb had a population of 4161 and number of houses are 886, with an average literacy rate of 64.1%. With male literacy being 67.1%, with female literacy being 26.8%. The main language spoken here is Marathi.

== Nearby villages ==
- Kantekur is 4 km away
- Kesar Jawalga is 5 km away
- Ambarnagar is 5 km away
- Murli is 7 km away
- Alur is 8 km away
- Murum is 5 km away

Belamb is surrounded by Anand Taluka towards south, Lohara taluka towards north, Akkalkot taluka towards west, Tuljapur taluka towards west.

== Nearby cities ==
The cities near to Kesar Jawalga are Umarga, Tuljapur, Nilanga, Gulbarga.

== Postal details ==
The postal head office for Kesar Jawalga is Murum. The pin code of Kesar Jawalga is 413605.

== Politics ==
The National Congress Party (NCP), Shiv Sena, SHS and INC are the major political parties in Kesar Jawalga.

=== Polling stations near Belamb ===
1. Z.P.P.S Belamb Central side
2. Z.P.P.S Kothali East side
3. Z.P.P.S Bedaga
4. Z.P.P.S Belamb North side
5. Z.P.P.S Koregavavadi
6. Lal bahadur shastri vidyalay

== Education ==
The colleges near Kesar Jawalga are:

1. Shri Sharadchandraji Pawar Junior college Naichakur
2. National Backward Agriculture Education Information Technology Osmanabad
3. Sevagram college
4. Sevagram college, Kavatha

The schools near Kesar Jawalga are:

1. Lal Bahadur Shastri Vidyalaya
2. Z.P.P school Laman Tanda
3. Z.P.C.P school
