= Kader, Maharashtra =

Village in Dharashiv, Maharashtra, India

Coordinates: 17°47′15″N 76°33′25″E

Kader is a village in Maharashtra, India. It is located in Umarga Taluka in Dharashiv district. The village resides in the Marathwada region, and falls under the supervision of the Chhatrapati Sambhajinagar division. Located 81 km towards east from the district headquarters Dharashiv, the village is also 9 km from Umarga and 483 km from the state capital Mumbai.

== Demographics ==
The main language spoken here is Marathi. According to the 2011 Census, the total population of Kader village is 5055 and number of houses are 1023. The population of female citizens is 48% and the rate of female literacy is 29%.

== Nearby villages ==
- Aurad is 4 km away
- Bhusni is 5 km away
- Kantekur is 6 km away
- Kasgi is 7 km away
- Palasgaon is 8 km away

Kader is surrounded by Åland taluka towards south, Lohara taluka towards north, Nilanga taluka towards north, Basavakalyan taluka towards east.

== Nearby cities ==
The cities near to Kader are Umarga, Tuljapur, Nilanga, Gulbarga.

== Postal details ==
The postal head office for Kader is Umarga. The pin code of Kader is 413606.

== Politics ==
The National Congress Party (NCP), Shiv Sena, SHS and INC are the major political parties in Kader.

=== Polling stations near Kader ===
1. Grampanchayat Office Madaj
2. Lokmanya Tilak Vidyalaya Kadeer Central side
3. Junior College Gunjoti south side
4. Lokmanya Tilak Vidyalaya Kadeer east side
5. Z.P.P.S Mulaj Tanda

== Education ==
The colleges near Kader are:

1. Shri Sharadchandraji Pawar Junior college Naichakur
2. National Backward Agriculture Education Information Technology Osmanabad
3. Sevagram college
4. Sevagram college, Kawatha

The schools in Kader are:

1. Lokmanya Tilak Vidyalaya
