= Kesar Jawalga =

Village in Maharashtra, India

Kesar Jawalga is a village in Maharashtra, India. It is located in Umarga Taluka in Osmanabad district. The village resides in the Marathwada region, and falls under the supervision of the Aurangabad division. Located 81 km towards south from the district headquarters Osmanabad, the village is also 25 km from Umarga and 477 km from the state capital Mumbai.

== Demographics ==
According to the 2011 Indian census, the village of Kesar Jawalga had a population of 4818, with an average literacy rate of 47.75%. With male literacy being 67.1%, with female literacy being 28.4%. The main language spoken here is Kannada.And secondary language is marathi and hindi.

== Nearby villages ==
- Belamb is 5 km away
- Kothali is 7 km away
- Varnalwadi is 7 km away
- Achaler is 9 km away
- Ambarnagar is 9 km away

Kesar Jawalga is surrounded by Umarga Taluka towards north, Lohara taluka towards north, Akkalkot taluka towards west, Tuljapur taluka towards west.

== Nearby cities ==
The cities near to Kesar Jawalga are Umarga, Tuljapur, Nilanga, Gulbarga.

== Postal details ==
The postal head office for Kesar Jawalga is Murum. The pin code of Kesar Jawalga is 413605.

== Politics ==
The National Congress Party (NCP), Shiv Sena, SHS and INC are the major political parties in Kesar Jawalga.

=== Polling stations near Kesar Jawalga ===
1. Lokmanya Tilak Vidyalaya
2. Z.P.P.S Kesar Jawalga Central side
3. Z.P.P.S Kesar Jawalga East side
4. Z.P.P.S Kavatha south side
5. Z.P.P.S Girls Achaler west side

== Education ==
The colleges near Kesar Jawalga are:

1. Shri Sharadchandraji Pawar Junior college Naichakur
2. National Backward Agriculture Education Information Technology Osmanabad
3. Sevagram college
4. Sevagram college, Kavatha

The schools near Kesar Jawalga are:

1. Mahatma Gandhi Vidyalaya
2. Z.P.C.P school
