= Dalimb =

Village in Maharashtra

Coordinates: 17°49′N 76°29′E

- Village
- Nickname: mungipaithan
- Interactive map of Dalimb
- Country: India
- State: Maharashtra

Dalimb is a village in Maharashtra, India. It is located in Umarga Taluka in Osmanabad district. The village resides in the Marathwada region, and falls under the supervision of the Aurangabad division. Located 67 km towards east from the district headquarters Osmanabad, the village is also 13 km from Umarga and 471 km from the state capital Mumbai.

== Demographics ==
The main language spoken here is Marathi and Kannad

== Nearby villages ==
- Dawal Malikwadi is 4 km away
- Rampur is 5 km away
- Yenegur is 6 km away
- Sundarwadi is 6 km away
- Naiknagar is 6 km away

Dalimb is surrounded by Åland taluka towards south, Lohara taluka towards north, Ausa taluka towards north, Tuljapur taluka towards west.

== Nearby cities ==
The cities near to Dalimb are Umarga, Tuljapur, Nilanga, Solapur.

== Postal details ==
The pin code of Dalimb is - 413604.

== Politics ==
The National Congress Party (NCP), Shiv Sena, SHS and INC are the major political parties in Dalimb.

=== Polling stations near Dalimb ===
1. Z.P.P.S Dagadadhanora
2. Z.P.P.S Dalimb Central side
3. Z.P.P.S Dalimb east side
4. Gram Panchayat office Bedaga

== Education ==
The colleges near Dalimb are:

1. Shri Sharadchandraji Pawar Junior college Naichakur
2. National Backward Agriculture Education Information Technology Osmanabad
3. Sevagram college
4. Sevagram college, Kawatha

The schools in Dalimb are:

1. Maulana Azad Urdu High School
2. Dyandeep Vidyalaya
3. Z.P.C.P school
