= Bori River =

River in India

Coordinates: 17°10′21″N 76°18′12″E

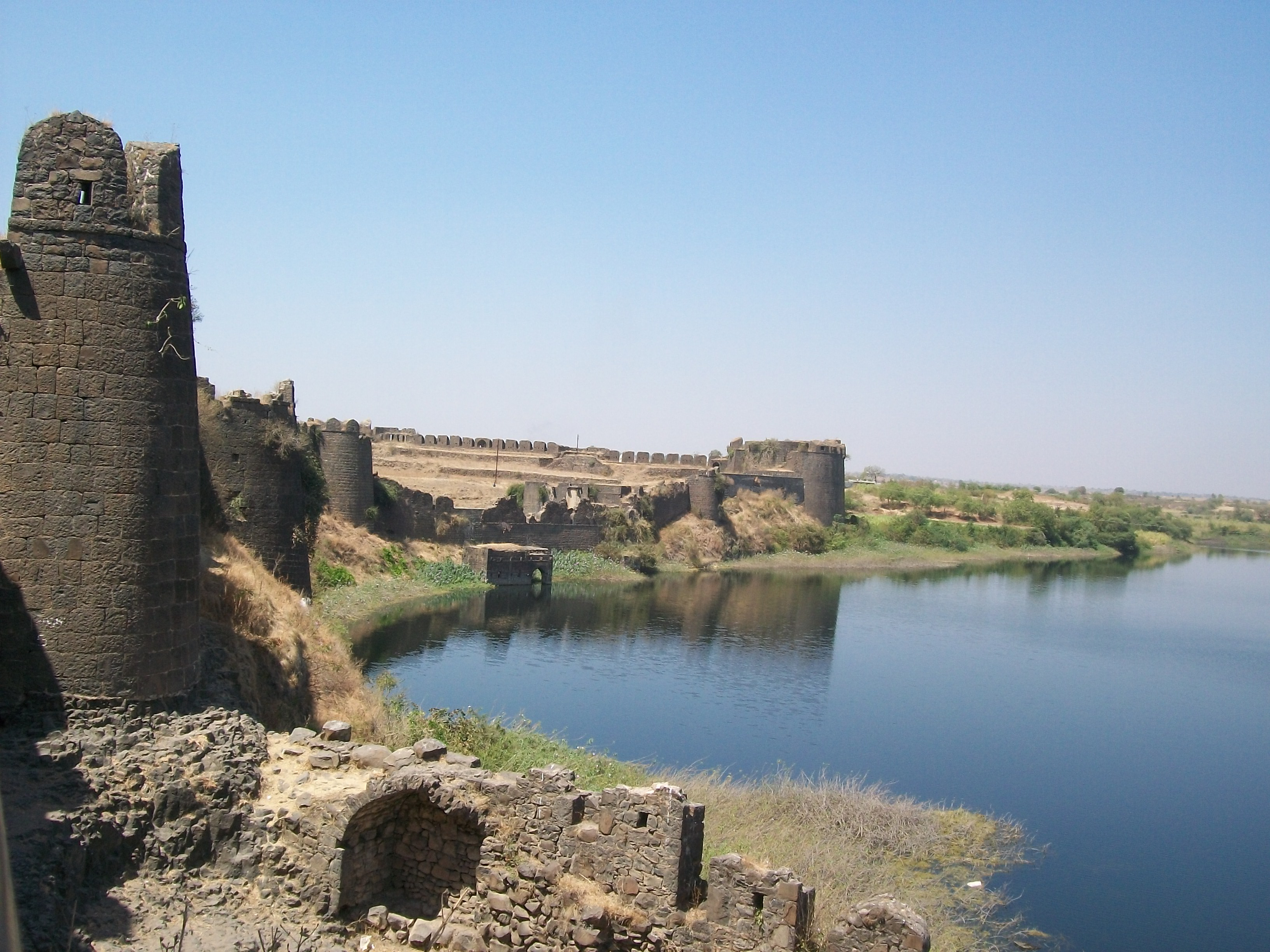
Medieval era Naldurg fort on the banks of Bori river

The Bori River is a tributary of the Bhima River, the main tributary of the Krishna River, in Maharashtra and Karnataka, India. It rises in the Balaghat Range near the hills of Dharur and flows southwards towards Akkalkot. Important places on or near its course include the town of Tuljapur, and the medieval fort of Naldurg. The Kurnur Dam at the confluence of Bori and the Harna river provides water for the area around Akkalkot. It meets the Bhima from the left near Afzalpur on the Karnataka side of Maharashtra-Karnataka border.

== Hydrology ==
The Bori River originates in the Balaghat Range near the hills of Dharur in Maharashtra. It flows predominantly southward, passing through Osmanabad district. Along its course, it flows close to the town of Tuljapur and skirts the base of the historic Naldurg Fort, where its course briefly widens, creating natural defensive moats around the fort walls. The river continues its course through the Deccan Plateau, receiving seasonal streams and runoff from nearby agricultural land.

The Kurnur Dam, located near the confluence of the Bori and Harna rivers, regulates the flow of the river and provides water for irrigation and domestic use in the surrounding region. After crossing into Karnataka, the Bori ultimately joins the Bhima River from the left near the town of Afzalpur, contributing to the Bhima’s flow as it continues southeastward toward the Krishna River basin.

The river’s hydrology is characterized by seasonal variability, with high discharge during the southwest monsoon (June to September) and significantly reduced flow during the dry months. This seasonal nature affects both agriculture and water availability in the catchment area.

== See also ==
- Bori Dam
