= Shelgaon =

Shelgaon may refer to:

- Shelgaon, a village in Jalgaon tahisil, Jalgaon (Khandesh) district, Maharashtra, India
- Shelgaon (Chakur), a village in Udgir tahisil, Latur district, Maharashtra, India
- Shelgaon Hatkar, a village in Parbhani district, Maharashtra, India
- Shelgaon (K), a village in Solapur district, Maharashtra, India
- Shelgaon Maratha, a village in Parbhani district, Maharashtra, India
- Shelgaon Rajgure, a village in Washim district, Maharashtra, India
- Shelgaon (Wangi), a village in Solapur district, Maharashtra, India
