= Bhusni =

Village in Osmanabad, Maharashtra, India

Coordinates: 17°48′20″N 76°31′20″E

- Village
- Interactive map of Bhusni
- Country: India
- State: Maharashtra

Bhusni is a village in Maharashtra, India. It is located in Umarga Taluka in Osmanabad district. The village resides in the Marathwada region, and falls under the supervision of the Aurangabad division. Located 75 km towards east from the district headquarters Osmanabad, the village is also 10 km from Umarga and 478 km from the state capital Mumbai.

== Demographics ==
The main language spoken here is Kannada. According to the 2011 Census, the total population of Bhusni village is 2984 and number of houses are 588. The population of female citizens is 66% and the rate of female literacy is 28%.

== Nearby villages ==
- murum is 5 km away
- chincholi bhuyar is 3 km away
- Naiknagar is 4 km away
- Murli is 4 km away
- Kantekur is 6 km away
- Kader is 5 km away
- Aurad is 6 km away

Bhusni is surrounded by Åland taluka towards south, Lohara taluka towards north, Nilanga taluka towards north, Tuljapur taluka towards west.

== Nearby cities ==
The cities near to Bhusni are Umarga, Tuljapur, Nilanga, Gulbarga.

== Postal details ==
The postal head office for Bhusni is MURUM. The pin code of Bhusni is 413605.

== Politics ==
The National Congress Party (NCP), Shiv Sena, SHS and INC are the major political parties in Bhusni.

=== Polling stations near Bhusni ===
1. Z.P.P.S CHINCHOLI BHUYAR south side
2. Z.P.P.S KADER NORTH side
3. Z.P.P.S BHUSANI east side
4. Z.P.P.S GUNJOTI east side
5. Z.P.P.S MURUM WEST SIDE

== Education ==
The colleges near Bhusni are:

1. s.m.p.college murum
2. Shri Sharadchandraji Pawar Junior college Naichakur
3. National Backward Agriculture Education Information Technology Osmanabad
4. Sevagram college
5. Sevagram college, Kawatha

The schools in Bhusni are:

1. Pratibha Niketan Vidyalaya
2. Z.P.C.P school
