= Ambarnagar =

Village in Osmanabad, Maharashtra, India

Coordinates: 17.773384°N 76.433939°E

Ambarnagar is a village in Maharashtra, India. It is located in Umarga Taluka in Osmanabad district. The village resides in the Marathwada region, and falls under the supervision of the Aurangabad division. Located 73 km towards south from the district headquarters Osmanabad, the village is also 20 km from Umarga and 472 km from the state capital Mumbai.

== Demographics ==
The main language spoken here is Marathi. According to the 2011 Census, the total population of Ambarnagar village is 619 and number of houses are 102. The population of female citizens is 46% and the rate of female literacy is 20%.

== Nearby villages ==
- Sundar wadi is 6 km away
- Kantekur is 7 km away
- Naik nagar is 6 km away
- Umarga is 7 km away

Ambarnagar is surrounded by Åland taluka towards south, Lohara taluka towards north, Akkalkot taluka towards south, Tuljapur taluka towards west.

A project named the Begumganj-4 (West) Evaluation and Development Well Excavation Project is located at Ambarnagar.

== Nearby cities ==
The cities near to Ambarnagar are Umarga, Tuljapur, Nilanga, Solapur.

== Postal details ==
The postal head office for Ambarnagar is Murum. The pin code of Ambarnagar is 413605.

== Politics ==
The National Congress Party (NCP), Shiv Sena, SHS and INC are the major political parties in Ambarnagar.

=== Polling stations near Ambarnagar ===
1. Minor Irrigation sub division Umarga
2. Pratibha Niketan Murum south side east room
3. Pratibha Niketan Murum north side P room
4. Chhatrapati Shivaji Mahavidyalaya Balasur east side
5. Z.P.P.S Alur west side

== Education ==
The colleges near Ambarnagar are:

1. Shri Sharadchandraji Pawar Junior college Naichakur
2. National Backward Agriculture Education Information Technology Osmanabad
3. Sevagram college
4. Sevagram college, Kawatha

The schools in Ambarnagar are:

1. Adarsh Highschool
2. Dr. Zakir Hussain Urdu Highschool
3. Pratibha Niketan Vidyalaya
4. Chhatrapati Shivaji Vidyalaya
