= Naiknagar =

Village in Maharashtra

Coordinates: 17°49′N 76°29′E

- Village
- Interactive map of Naiknagar
- Country: India
- State: Maharashtra

Naiknagar is a village in Maharashtra, India. It is located in Umarga Taluka in Osmanabad district. The village resides in the Marathwada region, and falls under the supervision of the Aurangabad division. Located 85 km towards east from the district headquarters Osmanabad, the village is also 13 km from Umarga, 474 km from the state capital Mumbai and 240 km from Hyderabad.Kalaburagi city is 80 km away from the village. Solapur is 65 km away from Naik nagar.

== Demographics ==
The main language spoken here is Lambadi and the official language is Marathi. Kannada is also spoken by people in Naik Nagar.

The population of this village is about 2500 and all of these people follow Hinduism

== Nearby villages ==
- Sundar wadi is 3 km away
- Kantekur is 7 km away
- Bhusni is 4 km away
- Umarga is 10 km away

Murum is 3 km away

Naik Nagar is surrounded by Aland taluka towards south, Lohara taluka towards north, Akkalkot taluka towards south, Tuljapur taluka towards west, Ausa taluka towards north, Basav Kalyan taluka towards west.

== Nearby cities ==
The cities near to Naiknagar are Umarga, Tuljapur, Nilanga, Solapur, Kalaburagi.

== Postal details ==
The postal head office for Naiknagar is Murum. The pin codes near Naiknagar are Dalimb - 413604, Murum - 413605, Umarga - 413606.

== Politics ==
The Shiv Sena and congress are the major political parties in Naiknagar.

=== Polling stations near Naiknagar ===
1. Z.P.P.S Naik Nagar
2. Z.P.P.S Naichakur
3. Z.P.P.S Ambarnagar
4. Z.P.P.S Savalasur
5. Z.P.P.S Sundaravadi east side

== Education ==
The colleges near Naiknagar are:

1. Vitthal sai Mahavidyala Naik Nagar
2. Shri. Madhavrao Patil Mahavidyala Murum

The schools in Naik Nagar are :

1. Latai Prathamik shala Naik Nagar
2. Zpps Naik Nagar
