= Mankeshwar =

Village in Maharashtra

- village
- Location in Maharashtra, India Mankeshwar (India)
- Coordinates: 18°21′15″N 075°38′21″E
- Country: India
- State: Maharashtra
- District: Osmanabad
- Tahsil: Bhoom

Population (2011)
  - Total: 5,062

Languages
  - Official: Marathi
- Time zone: UTC+5:30 (IST)
- PIN: 413504
- Lok Sabha constituency: Osmanabad
- Vidhan Sabha constituency: Paranda

Mankeshwar is a panchayat village in Bhoom Tehsil, Osmanabad district of Maharashtra, India. It is known for its Shiva temple and Goddess Satwai Devi temple.

There are two villages in Mankeshwar gram panchayat: Mankeshwar and Devangra.

== History ==
The Shiv temple has witnessed Islamic iconoclasm on multiple occasions. When the general of the Bijapur Sultanate - Afzal Khan - was sent to capture Shivaji, this is one of the several temples he destroyed on his march into Konkan where Shivaji was ensconced (other notable temples destroyed/desecrated at this time were Tulza Bhavani, and Pandharpur). Later, when Aurangzeb started destroying temples during the 27 year Mughal-Maratha war, this temple was also affected so a lot of the art and the statues on wall are in a damaged condition. Oral tradition says that there were seven other temples around the main one, but all were destroyed. There are rocks and statues lying around this temple that suggests it.

Ratnaparkhe (Kharat clan) from this village were historically warriors and carried out several developmental projects for the society. Narsigh rao Ratnaparkhe was a pioneer in development of this village.

== Culture ==
The Shiva temple in Mankeshwar, is among the type of temple called "Hemandpanti mandirs". This mandir is built out of a singular black rock which features art. There is a Shiva Linga in the temple, situated below the ground level, accessed by stairs. There is a river flowing around the temple, in a curved shape.

The Satwai devi temple is beside Shiva mandir. Satwai devi is the goddess of destiny and is also known as the sixth-day goddess. People around this village follows a tradition called "Jawal". This is a ritual in which a baby boy up to the age of 2–3 years is brought here. Hairs of the baby boy are cut and 'bali' of a male goat is given in devotion to the Satwai devi. Meal from the same male goat is prepared here and first served as a naivydya (offering) to the goddess and then to all the invitees. People have holistic faith in goddess.

Every year in Marathi Chaitra month celebrations are done where everybody from the village comes to the temple to celebrate the ancient traditions.

== Demographics ==
In the 2011 Indian census, Mankeshwar had 9,540 inhabitants, with 4,820 males (50.8%) and 4,720 females (49.2%), for a gender ratio of 960 females per thousand males.

In the 2011 census, Mankeshwar had 9,540 inhabitants.

== Economy ==
Mankeshwar is known for its agricultural products of jowar (a type of sorghum), tur (pigeon peas), bhuimug (peanuts) and similar crops. Although this village has not been benefited by the water irrigation projects, it still produces significant crops of jowar.

== Education ==
- In the Mankeshwar there are two schools available one is the Marathi Medium and the second is the Urdu Medium.

== Hospital ==
- Government Hospital, in 2014 Government will started the hospital, in this hospital there are every facilities are available like Treatment, Operation Theater, post Mortern, Delivery etc...

== Transport ==
- The nearest commercial airports are in Aurangabad and Nanded.
- The nearest Railway Station is 16 km south by road in Barshi.
- The S.T. bus runs to Bhoom and Barshi.
