= Dawal Malikwadi =

Village in Maharashtra

Coordinates: 17°49′N 76°29′E

Malikwadi
- Village
- Interactive map of Malikwadi
- Country: India
- State: Maharashtra

Dawal Malikwadi is a village in Maharashtra, India. It is located in Umarga Taluka in Osmanabad district. The village resides in the Marathwada region, and falls under the supervision of the Aurangabad division. Located 62 km towards east from the district headquarters Osmanabad, the village is also 18 km from Umarga and 467 km from the state capital Mumbai.

== Demographics ==
The main language spoken here is Marathi.

== Nearby villages ==
- Supatgaon is 3 km away
- Dalimb is 4 km away
- Yenegur is 4 km away
- Bhosga is 7 km away
- Jewali is 7 km away

Dawal Malikwadi is surrounded by Omerga taluka towards east, Ausa taluka towards north, Åland taluka towards south, Tuljapur taluka towards west.

== Nearby cities ==
The cities near to Dawal Malikwadi are Umarga, Tuljapur, Nilanga, Osmanabad.

== Postal details ==
The postal head office of Dawal Malikwadi is Dalimb. The pin code of Dawal Malikwadi is - 413604.

== Politics ==
The National Congress Party (NCP), Shiv Sena, SHS and INC are the major political parties in Dawal Malikwadi.

=== Polling stations near Dawal Malikwadi ===
1. Z.P.P.S Dastapur east side
2. Z.P.P.S Koral east side
3. Z.P.P.S Kondajigad central side
4. Z.P.P.S Sundarwadi west side
5. Z.P.P.S Supatgaon central side

== Education ==
The colleges near Dawal Malikwadi are:

1. Shri Sharadchandraji Pawar Junior college Naichakur
2. National Backward Agriculture Education Information Technology Osmanabad
3. Sevagram college
4. Sevagram college, Kawatha

The schools in Dawal Malikwadi are:

1. Adarsh Highschool
2. Dr. Zakir Hussain Urdu High School
3. Pratibha Niketan Vidyalaya
4. Chhatrapati Shivaji Maharaj Vidyalaya
