= Mangrul, Osmanabad =

Village in Maharashtra

Mangrul
- Village
- Interactive map of Mangrul
- Country: India
- State: Maharashtra
- District: Osmanabad district

The village of Mangrul is in Tuljapur tehsil in Osmanabad district in the Indian state of Maharashtra.

Mangrul is known for Chincheshwar Temple in center of village. In mungrul "Lord Shani- Maruti" temple is located at North-East side of village. Mangrul is 11 km away from Tuljapur and Bus Transport is available from tuljapur to Mangrul.
