= Madaj =

Madaj is a surname. Notable people with the surname include:

- Karol Madaj (born 1980), Polish board game designer
- Milan Madaj (born 1970), Slovak ski mountaineer
- Natalia Madaj (born 1988), Polish rower

== See also ==
- Madaj, Maharashtra, a village in Maharashtra, India
