= Turori =

Village in Maharashtra

- town
- Location in Maharashtra, India
- Coordinates: 17°49′40″N 76°41′25″E
- Country: India
- State: Maharashtra
- District: Osmanabad

Government
  - Type: state government and central government
  - Body: gram panchayat

Population
  - Total: > 15,000

Languages
  - Official: Marathi
- Time zone: UTC+5:30 (IST)
- Postal code: 413 606
- ISO 3166 code: IN-MH

Turori is a panchayat village of Omerga, Osmanabad, Maharashtra, India. It is very famous for chewing paan. The village is also awarded for Tanta Mukta Village.

== Geography ==
Turori has a moderate temperature. It varies from season to season.
