= Apsinga =

Village in Maharashtra, India

- Village
- Location in Maharashtra, India
- Coordinates: 18.03638°N 76.02476°E
- Country: India
- State: Maharashtra
- District: Osmanabad

Population (2011)
  - Total: 4,541

Languages
  - Official: Marathi
- Time zone: UTC+05:30 (IST)
- PIN: 413601

Apsinga is a village located in Tuljapur Tahsil in the Osmanabad District, Maharashtra, located 19.3 km away from the district headquarter Osmanabad.

== Climate ==
The climate of this region is cooler compared to other regions of the district, due to the plentiful vegetation. The average temperature ranges from 27 to 38 degrees Celsius, and the average rainfall of Osmanabad is about 730 mm a year.

== Geography ==
The entire area is covered by the southeast Balaghat range. The granite rocks have produce red and black cotton soil. Most of the hill tops are bare or cover coarse gravel, while the low laying areas accumulate clay and loam during the rainy season.

== History ==
Apsinga is 2.3 km southeast of an ancient habitation site of the Satavahana period (18.0°3′38.16″N 76.0°2′36.43″E), also named Apsinga. The site is surrounded by two small seasonal rivers, one at a distance of 300 m to the south (named "Nagzhari") and the other 5 m away, to the east (named "Kamta"). The archaeological remains at Apsinga suggest it to be one of the smaller Satavahana settlements supporting bigger settlements like Ter. According to the villagers, until recent times, cotton was traded via Wadgaon (Siddheswar), an ancient Stupa site, situated 8 km northeast of Apsinga towards Ter. The evidence of conch shell debitage and a large amount of shell bangle pieces suggests that the raw material was being imported to the site for shell working. The site seems to have covered an area of 3 hectares (including the brick structure of the area).

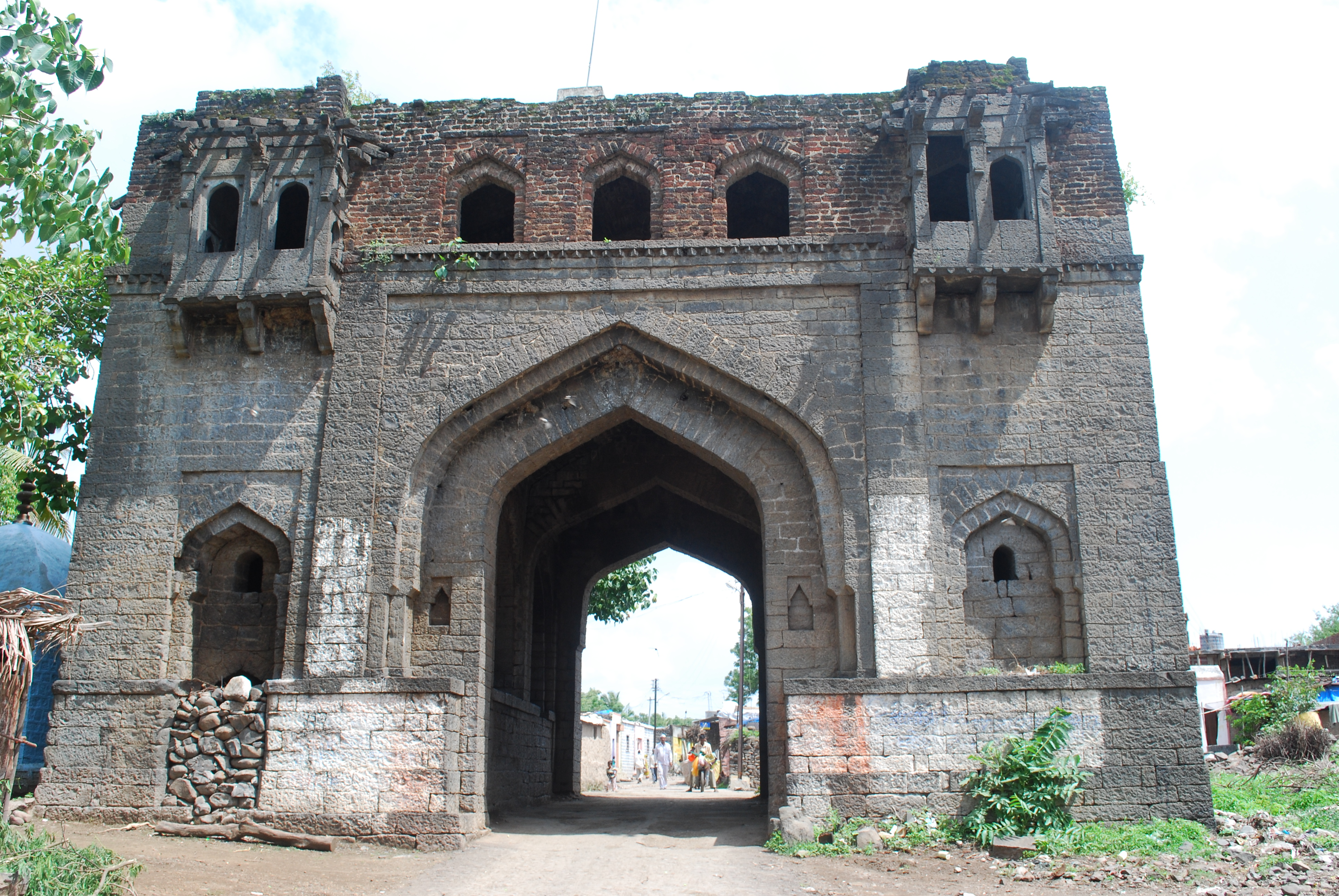
The gate of Apsinga village (Tuljapur)

Significant historical places include Apsinga-wes (आपसिंगा वेस), Hutatma smarak, Shree Ram Mandir, Jahagirdar wada, Hutatma Shridhar Vartak samadhisthal and Awliya Dargah. The people celebrate various festivals like Dipawali, Dussehra, Ganeshotsav, and Navratri.

== Economy ==
The main crops in the region are soyabeans, onions, grapes, jawar and other vegetables.

Majority of the population is dependent on agriculture and wage labouring. Around 80% of the village population has farming as their major source of livelihood. The rest of the 20% of the population is engaged either in laboring or move to Osmanabad or Tuljapur for non-farm activities like dairy and honey collection. Almost all women of the village work in the fields.
