= Naldurg Fort =

Fort in Osmanabad district, Maharashtra

- Naldurg, tuljapur taluka Dharashiv, Maharashtra, By Road 35 km from Tuljapur, 50 km from Dharashiv, 50 km from Solapur.
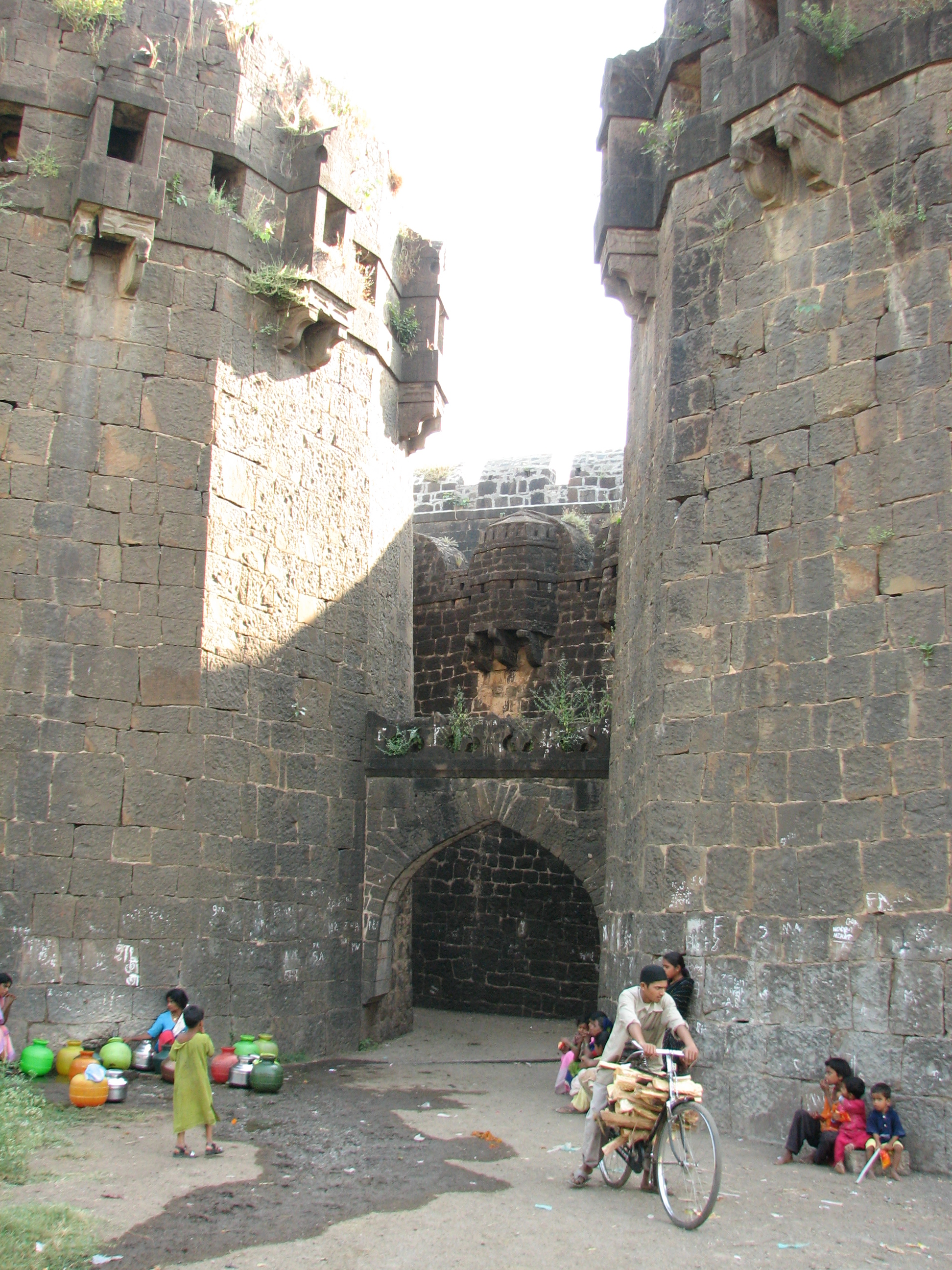
- Main entrance of the Naldurg Fort

Site information
- Owner: Government of India
- Open to the public: Yes

Location
- Naldurg Fort in Maharashtra
- Coordinates: 17.82°N 76.3°E

Naldurg Fort is a historic fort in Naldurg town of Dharashiv district in Maharashtra state of India. Naldurg Fort is named after Nalraja who built the fort in medieval architectural style. The unique feature of the fort is that it encloses a knoll of basalt rock which juts out into the valley of the small Bori River and a long fortification wall with many bastions. The Naldurg fort is one of the important ground forts in the Marathwada region.

Legends say that the fort was established by a King Nala, however It is likely that it was built during the Western Chalukya era. Over the centuries, it passed through the hands of the Bahmani Sultanate, the Adil Shahi dynasty, and the Mughals, before becoming part of the Nizam of Hyderabad's domain. It was a site of both governance and culture, famously hosting the marriage of Chand Bibi and serving as the burial site of notable figures like Nawab Amir Nawazul Mulk Bahadur.

== Design and architecture ==
It exemplifies medieval architectural style, enclosing a basalt knoll jutting into the valley of the river Bori. The fort is fortified on three sides with bastions built from sturdy basalt, capable of supporting heavy guns. Its circumference spans about a mile and a half, with ruined walls and a wide road leading to the center. Notable bastions within include Upli Buruj, Paranda Buruj, Nagar Buruj, Sangram Buruj, Bands Buruj, and Poone Buruj. Despite the ruins, remnants like Barood Kotha, Baradari, Ambarkhana, Rangaan Mahal, and Jali hint at past grandeur. The fort features two tanks, with notable cannons including the "Hathi Toph" and "Magar Toph." Key entrances include the Hathi Darwaza and Hurmukh Darwaza. A notable structure linking the fort and Ranmandala is the dam across the Bori river, with the "Pani Mahal" constructed within. This was built during Ibrahim Adil Shah II's reign in 1613.

== History ==
It is believed that the fort was constructed by Nalaraja (King Nala) and subsequently named after him, along with the city. Erected during the Western Chalukya Empire's reign, the fort later saw control shifts under various rulers. From 1351 to 1480, it fell under the Bahmani Sultanate, and in 1558, it came under the Adil Shahi dynasty. After the Adil Shahi Kingdom's downfall in 1686 AD, Naldurg passed into the hands of the Mughal Empire during the reign of Aurangzeb. He appointed Nizam-ul-Mulk, Asaf Jah I, as the Governor of the Entire Deccan region, including Central India and Gujarat up to Kanyakumari. Following Aurangzeb's demise, Nawab Nizam ul Mulk Asif Jah Bahadur established the Nizam Dominion. During his time, a rebellion led to the appointment of Nawab Mohammed Dulah Khan Bahadur as Governor. Later, his son, Nawab Amir Nawazul Mulk Bahadur, ruled successfully, displaying generosity by donating gold to compensate for a theft from Tulja Bhawani Temple. Noteworthy historical events include the marriage of Chand Bibi Sultana at Naldurg Fort and the burial sites of Nawab Amir Nawazul Mulk Bahadur and Princess Fakharunnisa Begam, daughter of Nizam ul Mulk II. Following the Nawab's demise, his successors governed until 1948, with the current heirs residing in Hyderabad, Telangana, showing sentimental attachment to Naldurg and its people. Strategically located en route from Solapur to Bijapur-Bidar, the fort boasts medieval architecture and engineering techniques, reflecting the era's signature styles.

== Location ==
Naldurg which was formerly a district headquarter is situated about 50 Kms south-east of Dharashiv (formerly Osmanabad). It is accessible through the Pune-Hyderabad highway (National Highway 65 (India)).
