= Washi, Osmanabad =

Village in Maharashtra

Washi Wasi, Vashi, Vasi
- Small city
- Location in Maharashtra, India Washi (India)
- Coordinates: 18°32′32″N 075°46′44″E
- Country: India
- State: Maharashtra
- District: Osmanabad
- Tahsil: Washi

Government
  - Type: Panchayati raj (India)
  - Body: Nagar panchayat

Area
  - Total: 53.03 km^{2} (20.47 sq mi)
- Elevation: 554 m (1,818 ft)

Population (2011)
  - Total: 27,826
  - Density: 524.7/km^{2} (1,359/sq mi)

Languages
  - Official: Marathi
- Time zone: UTC+5:30 (IST)
- PIN: 413503
- Telephone code: 02478
- ISO 3166 code: IN-MH
- Lok Sabha constituency: Osmanabad
- Vidhan Sabha constituency: Paranda
- Website: maharashtra.gov.in

Washi is a Nagar panchayat village and the headquarters of Washi taluka in Bhoom subdivision of Osmanabad district of Maharashtra state in India. The village of Washi is 22 km by road northeast of the town of Bhoom, and 25 km by road northwest of Yermala. The nearest railway station is 40 km by road southwest to Yedshi in Osmanabad District.

There are two villages in the Washi Nagar panchayat: Washi, Kavdewadi, Kelewadi.

== Demographics ==
In the 2001 India census the village of Washi had 13,338 inhabitants, with 6,948 males (52.1%) and 6,390 females (47.9%), for a gender ratio of 920 females for every thousand males.

In the 2011 India census the village of Washi was reported as having 7,826 inhabitants. There is no explanation of the decrease from 2001 to 2011.
