= Terkheda =

Village in Maharashtra

- village
- Location in Maharashtra, India Terkheda (India)
- Coordinates: 18°26′42″N 075°50′12″E
- Country: India
- State: Maharashtra
- District: Osmanabad
- Tahsil: Washi

Government
  - Type: Panchayati raj (India)
  - Body: Gram panchayat

Population (2011)
  - Total: 9,568

Languages
  - Official: Marathi
- Time zone: UTC+5:30 (IST)
- PIN: 413525
- Lok Sabha constituency: Osmanabad
- Vidhan Sabha constituency: Paranda

Terkheda is a panchayat village in Washi taluka of Osmanabad district in India. Terkheda is the only village listed in its gram panchayat, but it is surrounded by thirteen small villages and has an old history; Hindus, Lingayats and Muslims all live together there. The village is surrounded by many hills and is next to the Tirna River (Terna River). National Highway 211 runs just south of the main village.

This village is an industrious and prosperous village. The economy is mainly based upon agriculture, but firecrackers are also manufactured there, inverter manufacturing, pipe manufacturing, fabrication manufacturing, Hotels these are the main businesses. The village has several temples and a durgah (Sufi shrine).

Terkheda is known as "Shivkahsi" of Maharashtra as in this village there are so many Firecrackers factory are There. "Terkheda Tota" was very famous in the Year 2000.

Terkheda have schools named Z.P.Primary School, Z.P. Kanya School, Ganesh Vidyalaya, Subodh Vidyamandir, Swami Vivekanand English Medium School, Parivartan School, Nursing College And has One D.ed College also.

All villagers celebrate Chaitri Utsav for the goddess Yedai at a temple which is situated 8 km away. Every year after Hanuman Jayanti, Yedai is worshiped for 4 days.

== Demographics ==
In the 2001 Indian census, the village of Terkhead had 6,060 inhabitants, with 3,135 males (51.7%) and 2,925 females (48.3%), for a gender ratio of 933 females per thousand males.

In the 2011 census, the population of Terkhead had decreased to 4,762 inhabitants.
