= Benitura Dam =

- Location within Maharashtra
- Official name: Benitura Dam
- Location: Omerga
- Coordinates: 17.7928644°N 76.456497°E
- Opening date: 1994
- Owners: Government of Maharashtra, India

Dam and spillways
- Type of dam: Earthfill
- Impounds: local river at TUGAON village
- Height: 13.48 m (44.2 ft)
- Length: 1,780 m (5,840 ft)
- Dam volume: 0 km^{3} (0 cu mi)

Reservoir
- Total capacity: 0 km^{3} (0 cu mi)
- Surface area: 0 km^{2} (0 sq mi)

Benitura Dam, is an earthfill dam on local river near Omerga, Osmanabad district in the state of Maharashtra in India.

== Specifications ==
The height of the dam above lowest foundation is 13.48 m (44.2 ft) while the length is 1,780 m (5,840 ft). The volume content is 0 km^{3} (0 cu mi) and gross storage capacity is 0.012810 km^{3} (0.003073 cu mi).

== Purpose ==
- Irrigation

== See also ==
- Dams in Maharashtra
- List of reservoirs and dams in India
