= National Highway 652 (India) =

National Highway in India

National Highway 652
- Map of National Highway 652 in red

Route information
- Auxiliary route of NH 52
- Length: 70.7 km (43.9 mi)

Major junctions
- North end: Tuljapur
- South end: Akkalkot

Location
- Country: India
- States: Maharashtra

Highway system
- Roads in India; Expressways; National; State; Asian
← NH 52	→ NH 150E

National Highway 652, commonly referred to as NH 652 is a national highway in India. It is a secondary route of primary National Highway 52. NH-652 is located in the state of Maharashtra in India.

== Route ==
NH652 connects Tuljapur, Andur, Naldurg, Hannur and Akkalkot in the state of Maharashtra.

== Junctions ==
NH 52 Terminal near Tuljapur.
NH 150E Terminal near Akkalkot.

== See also ==
- List of national highways in India
- List of national highways in India by state
