= Madaj, Maharashtra =

Village in Maharashtra

Madaj Mathmal
- village
- Location in Maharashtra, India Madaj (India)
- Coordinates: 17°55′39″N 076°37′16″E
- Country: India
- State: Maharashtra
- District: Osmanabad
- Tahsil: Umarga

Government
  - Body: Village panchayat

Population (2001)
  - Total: 5,113

Languages
  - Official: Marathi
- Time zone: UTC+5:30 (IST)
- Postal code: 413606
- Telephone code: 02475
- ISO 3166 code: IN-MH
- Lok Sabha constituency: Osmanabad
- Vidhan Sabha constituency: Umarga

Madaj is a panchayat village in the state of Maharashtra, India. Administratively, Madaj is under Umarga Tehsil of Osmanabad District in Maharashtra. There is only the single village of Madaj in the Madaj gram panchayat. The village of Madaj is 17 km by road north of the town of Umarga and 20 km by road southeast of the village of Sastur.

== Demographics ==
In the 2001 census, the village of Madaj had 5,113 inhabitants, with 2,667 males (52.2%) and 2,446 females (47.8%), for a gender ratio of 917 females per thousand males.

In the 2011 census, the village of Madaj reported 2,888 inhabitants. No explanation has been found for the large reduction in reported population.

== Temples ==
Madaj is an old village with several temples. These include:

- Shri Premnath Maharaj is a temple and religious place dedicated to the saint Premnath Maharaj, who was one of the disciples of Nounath. Premnath Maharaj achieved his samadhi here. Every year an annual yatra (pilgrimage fair) is held in the month of November, and people come to Madaj and the temple in large numbers to take darshan during the yatra.
- The Shri Narayana Temple is a hemadpanthi style temple with carvings in the stone.
1. shri vaijnath maharaj temple is also one of the beuti of madaj.at the center of town in the lake temple is located.Basically this is the center point of village.
