= Alur, Osmanabad =

Village in Maharashtra

Alur Aloor
- village
- Nickname: village head - Suresh bolde
- Location in Maharashtra, India Alur (India)
- Coordinates: 17°41′51″N 076°25′31″E
- Country: India
- State: Maharashtra
- District: Osmanabad
- Tahsil: Omerga

Government
  - Body: Village panchayat

Area
  - Total: 35.64 km^{2} (13.76 sq mi)
- Elevation: 458 m (1,503 ft)

Population (2011)
  - Total: 7,931
  - Density: 222.5/km^{2} (576.4/sq mi)

Languages
  - Official: Marathi, Kannada
- Time zone: UTC+5:30 (IST)
- PIN: 413605
- ISO 3166 code: IN-MH
- Lok Sabha constituency: Osmanabad
- Vidhan Sabha constituency: Umarga
- Website: maharashtra.gov.in

Alur is a panchayat village in the state of Maharashtra, India. It is administratively under the Umarga Tahsil of Osmanabad District in Maharashtra. There is only the single village of Alur in the Alur gram panchayat. The village is 31 km by road southeast of Naldurg and 52 km by road southwest of Umarga, but only 13 km by road northeast of Wagdari, in Solapur District.

Alur is situated 17 km from NH-9 on the Akkalkot–Omerga road. It was formerly a border village of Hyderabad. Under the Nizam, it had a naka to collect taxes.

== Demographics ==
In the 2001 census, the village of Alur had 6,948 inhabitants, with 3,591 males (51.7%) and 3,357 females (48.3%), for a gender ratio of 935 females per thousand males.

In the 2011 census, the village of Alur had 7,931 inhabitants.

Marathi and Kannada are the official and most widely spoken language.

Alur is also known for "Alur Pedha" made from milk and sugar.

== Temples and culture ==
This village has ancient temples of Lord Siva: Shantehshwar Temple, Sangameshwar Temple, Someshwar Temple, Sangamudreshwar Temple and Narasimha Temple.

== Infrastructure ==
Education: Marathi Zilla Parishad High School until 10th standard, Zilla Parishad Kanya Shala and Urdu school Madarsa Maheraj Ululum.

Several private English nursery schools have started, including Shri. Someshwar English school and Saraswati English School.

Alur has a "Center of Sanskrit Education and Examination" affiliated with Bharatiya Vidya Bhavan, Mumbai. Itr was started by the late Sri. Shantappa Birajdar – Guruji, hundreds of students have completed various level of Sanskrit courses, it has benefited young students in learning about Indic culture and the mother language of Hindi.

Health Care: The government hospital, with more than 100 beds, is the medical center for nearby villages.there are also private badli tak laxmi clinic and shiv clinic and kasturi clinic

Financial Alur has one government bank, Maharashtra Grameen Bank, formerly known as Marathwada Grameen Bank, a subsidiary of "Bank of Maharashtra". There is a government approved "Sahakari Patsanstha" and privately owned registered finance offices.

Transportation Alur has government buses running to Umarga and Akkalkot. Private vehicles are also available for hire.

Places where people travel regularly for business, religious or official work.

- Tuljapur- 60 km for Flower market and devotees of "Goddess Tuljabhavani".
- Pandharpur- 130 km for cattle trading.
- Solapur- 70 km for agriculture trading.
- Åland- 30 km for wholesale grocery and agriculture machinery buying and trading.
- Omerga- 29 km for all legal formalities of land dealings as it is the taluka center.
- Akkalkot- 33 km for agriculture trading.
- Latur - 88 km for agriculture trading.

Industry Agriculture is the major industry in the surrounding area, and the village has typical small industries that support agricultural activities. There are several mills, the Khyade flour mill being one of the oldest. Agriculture based machinery like tractors, harvesting machines, oil explorers, rice mill hullers are serviced and leased.
