= Bori Dam =

- Location within Maharashtra
- Official name: Bori Dam D01356
- Location: Tamaswadi
- Coordinates: 20.777617°N 75.038012°E
- Opening date: 1977
- Owners: Government of Maharashtra, India

Dam and spillways
- Type of dam: Earthfill
- Impounds: Bori river
- Height: 20 m (66 ft)
- Length: 3,365 m (11,040 ft)
- Dam volume: 0.05534 km^{3} (0.01328 cu mi)

Reservoir
- Total capacity: 0.025020 km^{3} (0.006003 cu mi)
- Surface area: 8.460 km^{2} (3.266 sq mi)

Bori Dam, is an earthfill dam on the Bori River near Tamaswadi, Parola, Jalgaon district in state of Maharashtra in India.

== Specifications ==
The height of the dam above lowest foundation is 20 m (66 ft) while the length is 3,365 m (11,040 ft). The volume content is 0.05534 km^{3} (0.01328 cu mi) and gross storage capacity is 0.040960 km^{3} (0.009827 cu mi).

== Purpose ==
- Irrigation

== See also ==
- Dams in Maharashtra
- List of reservoirs and dams in India
