= Kas River =

Location
- Country: India
- State: Maharashtra

Physical characteristics
- Source
  - location: Hilly areas of Buldhana district, India
- Mouth
  - location: Near the village Shelgaon Rajgure, Maharashtra, India
- Length: 56 km (35 mi)

The Kas River is a seasonal river located in the Washim and Buldhana districts of western Vidarbha, Maharashtra, India. It is approximately 56 km long. The river originates in the hilly areas of Buldhana district. This hills are part of Ajanta Ranges. Because the hills have seasonal rains, the Kas River remains dry for nearly six months of the year. The river flows southeast from its origin and meets the Penganga River near the village Shelgaon Rajgure.
