= Shelgaon Maratha =

Village in Maharashtra

== Shelgaon Mahavishnu ==
Shelgaon
- Village
- Nickname: Shelgaon Mahavishnu
- Location in Maharashtra Shelgaon (India)
- Country: India
- State: Maharashtra
- District: Parbhani

Government
  - Type: Gram panchayat
- Elevation: 409 m (1,342 ft)

Population (2011)
  - Total: 3,282

Languages
  - Official: Marathi
- Time zone: UTC+5:30 (IST)
- PIN: 431516
- Telephone code: 02453
- Vehicle registration: MH-22

Shelgaon, commonly known as "Shelgaon Mahavishnu" is a village located in Sonpeth taluka of Parbhani district, in state of Maharashtra.

== Demographics ==
As per 2011 census:

- Shelgaon Mahavishnu has 670 families residing. The village has population of 3282.
- Out of the population of 3282, 1676 are males while 1606 are females.
- Literacy rate of the village is 62.50%.
- Average sex ratio of Shelgaon village is 958 females to 1000 males. Average sex ratio of Maharashtra state is 929.

== Geography, and transport ==
Distance between Shelgaon Mahavishnu, and district headquarter Parbhani is 65 kilometres (40 mi), and 10 kilometres (6.2 mi) from taluka headquarter Sonpeth.
