= Kurnur Dam =

- Location within Maharashtra
- Official name: Kurnur Dam D04235
- Location: Akkalkot
- Coordinates: 17.6168289°N 76.2155566°E
- Opening date: 1968
- Owners: Government of Maharashtra, India

Dam and spillways
- Type of dam: Earthfill
- Impounds: Bori river
- Height: 23.7 m (78 ft)
- Length: 1,206 m (3,957 ft)
- Dam volume: 45 km^{3} (11 cu mi)

Reservoir
- Total capacity: 32,670 km^{3} (7,840 cu mi)
- Surface area: 570 km^{2} (220 sq mi)

Kurnur Dam is an earthfill dam on Bori river near Akkalkot, Solapur district in the state of Maharashtra in India.

== Specifications ==
The height of the dam above lowest foundation is 23.7 m (78 ft) while the length is 1,206 m (3,957 ft). The volume content is 45 km^{3} (11 cu mi) and gross storage capacity is 35,240.00 km^{3} (8,454.53 cu mi).

== Purpose ==
- Irrigation
- Kurnur Dam is the origin of water for citizens in Akklkot Taluka, it is the source of water to all the farmers in the village for livelihood. It provides a fundamental need for people who lives in Kurnur village.

== See also ==
- Dams in Maharashtra
- List of reservoirs and dams in India
