= Shelgaon (Wangi) =

Village in Maharashtra

- village
- Location in Maharashtra, India Shelgaon (Wangi) (India)
- Country: India
- State: Maharashtra
- District: Solapur district

Languages
  - Official: Marathi
- Time zone: UTC+5:30 (IST)

Shelgaon (Wangi) is a village in the Karmala taluka of Solapur district in Maharashtra state, India.

== Demographics ==
Covering 1,707 hectares (4,220 acres) and comprising 858 households at the time of the 2011 census of India, Shelgaon (Wangi) had a population of 4021. There were 2090 males and 1931 females, with 493 people being aged six or younger.
