= Bhoom taluka =

Bhum Tahsil Bhoom Tahsil
- tehsil
- Location in Maharashtra, India
- Coordinates: 18°29′N 075°36′E
- Country: India
- State: Maharashtra
- District: Osmanabad

Population (2011)
  - Total: 137,217

Languages
  - Official: Marathi
- Time zone: UTC+5:30 (IST)
- PIN: 413504
- Vehicle registration: MH25
- Lok Sabha constituency: Osmanabad
- Vidhan Sabha constituency: Paranda

Bhoom Tahsil is a tehsil in Osmanabad district, Maharashtra on the Deccan Plateau of India. The town of Bhoom is the administrative headquarters of the tahsil. There are seventy-four panchayat villages in Bhoom Tahsil. In 19th century Bhoom was under Nizam territory during the British raj in India. However it was independently ruled by the Thorat royal family. Shrimant Vijaysinh Amarsinh Thorat is the present head of Bhoom. He was the President of Bhoom Municipal Council from 1991 -2006.

== History ==
At the starting of 17th century Bhoom was under Adilshah's territory. After 17th century it was under the Maratha Empire. In 1717 Sambhaji II of Kolhapur gave the Bhoom as Jagir to Senakhaskhel Yashwantrao Thorat (a Chief and Military leader) for his bravery. He ruled Bhum till 1719. In 1719 he had died in a battle with Balaji Vishwanath near Panhala fort. After his death his ancestors ruled Bhoom till 15 August 1947.

== Rulers of Bhoom ==
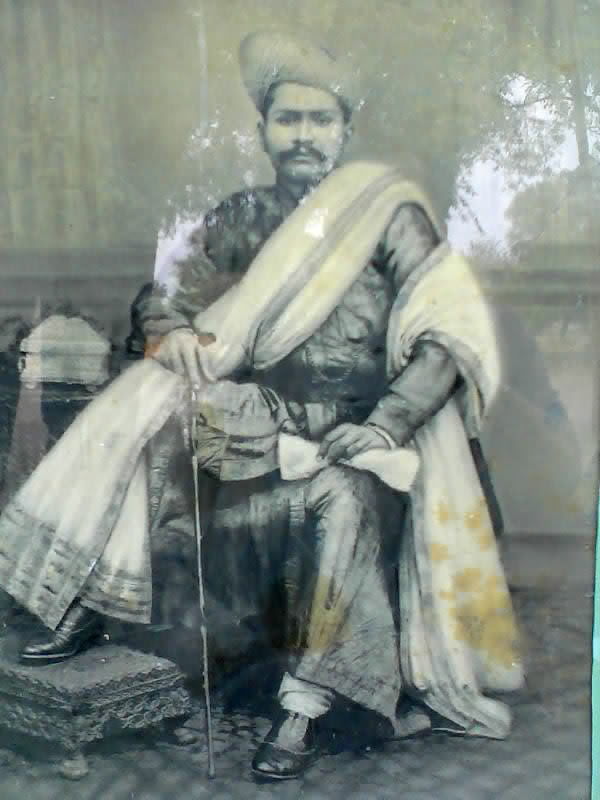
Shrimant Senakhaskhel Vijaysinh Thorat fourth ruler of the Bhoom

- Shrimant Senakhaskhel Yashwantrao Thorat (1717-1719) was the founder of this jagir.
- Shrimant Senakhaskhel Narayanrao Thorat - Second ruler of Bhoom.
- Shrimant Senakhaskhel Dattajirao Thorat - Third ruler of Bhoom.
- Shrimant Senakhaskhel Vijaysinh Thorat - Fourth ruler of Bhoom.
- Shrimant Senakhaskhel Amarsinh Thorat - Fifth and last ruler of Bhoom.

== Demographics ==
In the 2001 Indian census, Bhum Tehsil had a population of 116,894, with 60,620 (51.9%) males and 56,274 (48.1%) females, for a gender ratio of 928 females per thousand males.

In the 2011 census, Bhum Tahsil had 137,217 inhabitants and a gender ratio of 905 females per thousand males. The tehsil was 86.4% rural. The literacy rate in 2011 was 73.08% overall in Bhum Tehsil, with a rate of 82.86% for males and 62.45% for females. In 2011 in Bhum Tahsil, 11.5% of the population was 0 to 6 years of age.

== Monuments and attractions ==
- In the village of Kunthalgiri, near to the town of Bhum, there is an ancient Jain temple. Kunthalgiri is also famous for "pedha" a sweet.
- In the Bhum, there is an ancient temple called "Alam-prabhu". It is the Patron Deity of the Bhum. "Alam-prabhu" as its name indicates is the symbol of unity between Hindu and Muslim. In the month of December there's a huge fair in the name of lord "Datta" is held, which lasts for 4–5 days.
- In the village of Jyotibachiwadi, there is temple of god "Jotiba". Lot of people come there in 'Chaitra Paurnima'.
