= Washi taluka =

Washi Tahsil Vashi Tahsil, Vasi Tahsil, Wasi Tahsil
- tehsil
- Location in Maharashtra, India
- Coordinates: 18°32′N 075°45′E
- Country: India
- State: Maharashtra
- District: Osmanabad

Population (2011)
  - Total: 92,173

Languages
  - Official: Marathi
- Time zone: UTC+5:30 (IST)
- Lok Sabha constituency: Osmanabad
- Vidhan Sabha constituency: Paranda

Washi Tahsil is a tahsil/taluka (subdistrict) in Osmanabad district, Maharashtra on the Deccan Plateau of India. The town of Washi is the administrative headquarters of the tahsil. There are forty-three panchayat villages in Washi Tahsil.

== Demographics ==
In the 2001 Indian census, Washi Tahsil had a population of 95,434, with 49,346 (51.7%) males and 46,088 (48.3%) females, for a gender ratio of 934 females per thousand males.

In the 2011 census, Washi Tahsil had 92,173 inhabitants and a gender ratio of 918 females per thousand males. The tahsil was 100% rural. The literacy rate in 2011 was 75.09% overall in Washi Tahsil, with a rate of 85.26% for males and 64.22% for females. In 2011 in Washi Tahsil, 11.3% of the population was 0 to 6 years of age. There was no explanation for the decrease in population from 2001 to 2010 for the tahsil, but the village of Washi suffered even a higher percentage decrease.
