= Shelgaon Rajgure =

Village in Maharashtra

- village
- Location in Maharashtra, India
- Coordinates: 20°04′51.4″N 76°51′07.9″E
- Country: India
- State: Maharashtra
- District: Washim

Government
  - Type: Grampanchayat
  - Body: Shelgaon Rajgure Gram Panchayat

Area
  - Total: 6.72 km^{2} (2.59 sq mi)
- Elevation: 510 m (1,670 ft)

Population (2011)
  - Total: 1,314
  - Density: 195.5/km^{2} (506/sq mi)
- Demonym: Shelgaonkar (शेलगावकर)

Languages
  - Official: Marathi
- Time zone: UTC+5:30 (IST)
- PIN: 444 504
- Telephone code: 07251
- Vehicle registration: MH-37
- Literacy Rate: 86.92%
- Coastline: 0 kilometres (0 mi)
- Nearest city: Washim
- Lok Sabha constituency: Akola
- Civic agency: Shelgaon Rajgure Gram Panchayat
- Climate: Monsoon (Köppen)
- Precipitation: 855 millimetres (33.7 in)
- Avg. summer temperature: 45 °C (113 °F)
- Avg. winter temperature: 20 °C (68 °F)

Shelgaon Rajgure is a village in Risod Tehsil of Washim district in Maharashtra.

== Geography ==
The Shelgaon Rajgure is located in the western part of the Washim District in Risod Tehsil. It at a distance of 2 km west of Masala Pen village which is located at a distance of 16 km north of Risod and 88 km south of Akola on Akola-Risod State Highway. Kas River flows to the south which is a tributary of Penganga River and their confluence is 1.6 km to the south-east. It is bounded by village of Gowardhan to the East, Masla Pen to the West, Kinkheda and Pen Bori to the south and Keshavnagar and Waghi Budruk to the North. To the south is the valley of River Kas and River Penganga, while to the North are hills and Waghi Dam Spillway-Reservoir. River Kas and Waghi Dam Spillway-Reservoir delineate its boundary to the south and north respectively. Soil of River Kas and River Penganga Valley is Black Soil which is very fertile. The average elevation of the village is 635m. Agriculture is the main occupation of the peoples. Waghi Dam Spillway and Reservoir which is an earth-filled gravity dam is an important source of irrigation. Well irrigation is another source of water for agricultural use and only source of drinking water.

== Climate and agriculture ==
The climate of Shelgaon Rajgure is generally hot with sometimes the temperature reaching 45 °C. Shelgaon Rajgure has the monsoon type of climate with seasonal rainfall. Most of rainfall is received during the monsoon season. The average annual rainfall is 793 mm. The winters are cool and dry, with sometimes the temperature falling till 8.6-degree Celsius. Then comes the summer, which is very hot. At the noon the temperature rises and it becomes very hot with much less humidity.

Agriculture is the main occupation of the peoples in Shelgaon Rajgure. Nearly all its labour force is engaged in agriculture. The land is fertile with Black Soil. Important crops cultivated include soybean in monsoon season or Kharif season and gram, wheat, tur and Jowar in winter or Rabi season. groundnut, moong, dadar, sesame, vegetable, onions and flower are also cultivated in small amount. soybean and gram are the chief crops. The amount of rainfall received each year varies greatly. In hilly arias to North of village, there exist a small dam, providing water for irrigation to those regions. Otherwise irrigation is completely dependent on wells which are numerous in the village. Farms located near River Kas mostly use river water for irrigation.

== Transportation and communication ==
Transportation facilities in the village are well developed. It is connected by road to all the major towns. It is located on Mehkar-Mangrul Zanak-Masla Pen road. This was formerly Single-Lane Tar Road which is now converted into a Double-Lane Road. This road meets Akola-Risod-Parbhani State Highway at village of Masla Pen 2 km to the west of Shelgaon Rajgure. It directly connected by road network to Risod, Washim, Malegaon (Washim), Akola, Hingoli, Parbhani, Aurangabad, Amravati, etc. Private transport vehicles operate on Dongaon-Masala Pen-Risod route. This private vehicles operate at a frequency of 10–15 minutes. MSRTC (Maharashtra State Road Transport Corporation) buses connect Shelgaon Rajgure to Risod, Mehkar, Washim, Akola (from Masla Pen), Aurangabad, and Jalna. Telecom Operators Idea Cellular and Reliance Jio have good coverage. They provide 3G and 4G data connection.

== Peoples and Culture ==
Entire population is composed of Marathi peoples. There are no linguistic minorities in Shelgaon Rajgure. Marathi is de facto and official language. There are two main religions of Hinduism and Buddhism in village. Hindus form the majority and are usually better off than Buddhist in terms of income, quality of life, education, etc. Buddhists are mostly dalit converts. Education used to be very poor a decade ago. But due to opening of new English-medium school in the region in last decade has improved the quality of education. Bhavana Public School, Degaon (6 km) and Sunrise English School, Risod(18 km) are two prominent English-medium schools in this region. Diwali, Ganeshotsava, Pola, Gauri Puja, etc. are main festivals which are celebrated every year.
