= Bhoom =

- town
- Location in Maharashtra, India
- Coordinates: 18°27′35″N 75°39′39″E
- Country: India
- State: Maharashtra
- District: Osmanabad
- Tahsil: Bhoom

Languages
  - Official: Marathi
- Time zone: UTC+5:30 (IST)
- PIN: 413504
- Telephone code: 912478
- Vehicle registration: MH25
- Nearest cities: Latur, Beed, Barshi and Solapur
- Lok Sabha constituency: Osmanabad
- Vidhan Sabha constituency: Paranda

Bhoom is a town with a municipal council in Osmanabad district, Maharashtra, India, and it is the headquarters of Bhoom tahsil. It is situated on the banks of the River Banaganga, which eventually flows into the Bhima.

== Demographics ==
In the 2001 Indian census, Bhum Tahsil had a population of 116,894, with 60,620 (51.9%) males and 56,274 (48.1%) females, for a gender ratio of 928 females per thousand males.

In the 2011 census, Bhum Tahsil had 137,217 inhabitants and a gender ratio of 905 females per thousand males. The tahsil was 86.4% rural. The literacy rate in 2011 was 73.08% overall in Bhum Tahsil, with a rate of 82.86% for males and 62.45% for females. In 2011, 11.5% of the population of Bhum Tahsil was 0 to 6 years of age.
