= National Highway 150E (India) =

National highway in India

National Highway 150E

Route information
- Length: 105 km (65 mi)

Major junctions
- From: Gulbarga
- To: Barshi

Location
- Country: India
- Primary destinations: – Chowdapur – Afzalpur

Highway system
- Roads in India; Expressways; National; State; Asian
← NH 50	→ NH 52

National Highway 150E (NH 150E) is a National Highway in India starting from Gulbarga and ending at Solapur.
