= Osmanabad district =

- District of Maharashtra
- Dharashiv district
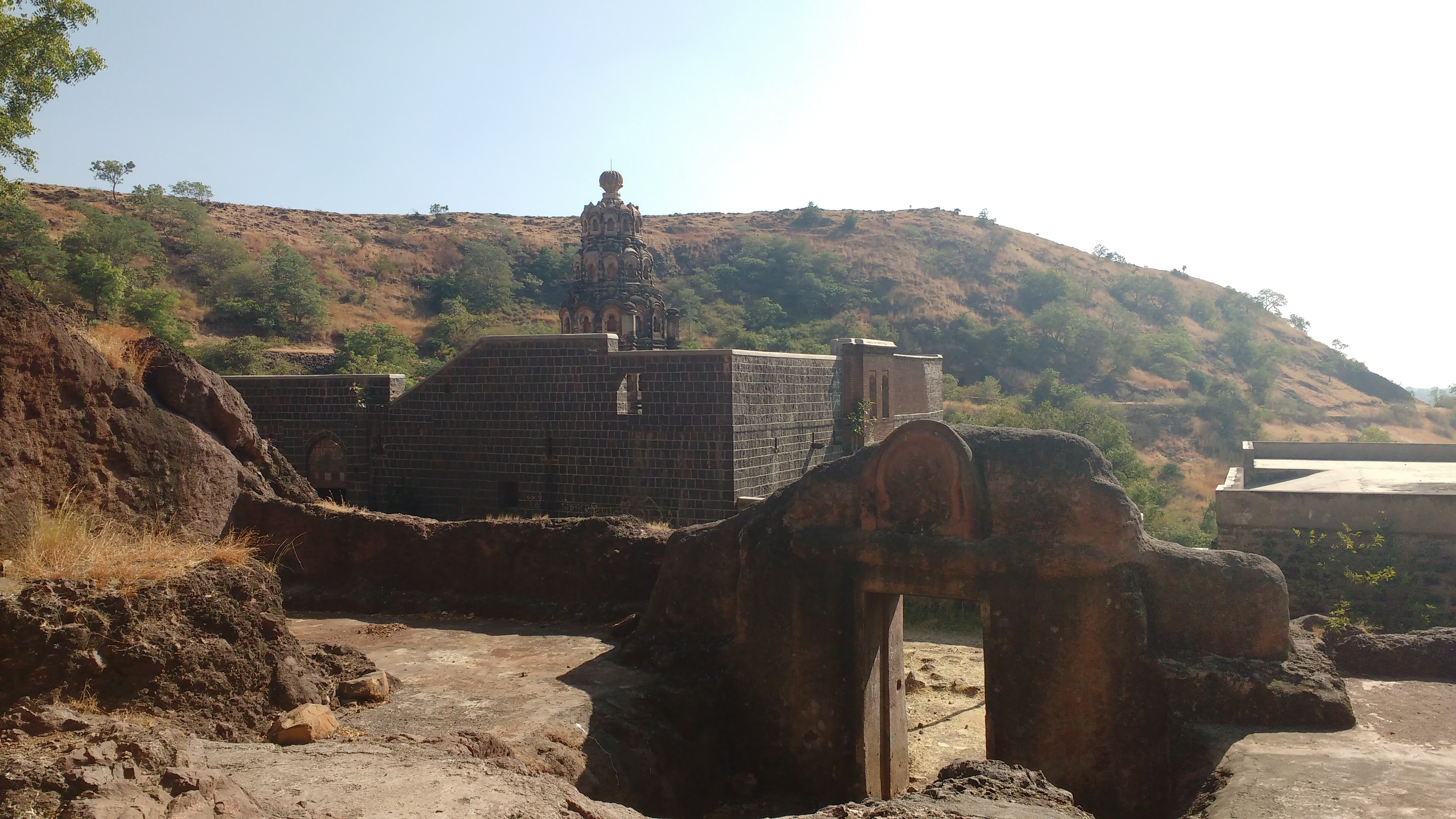
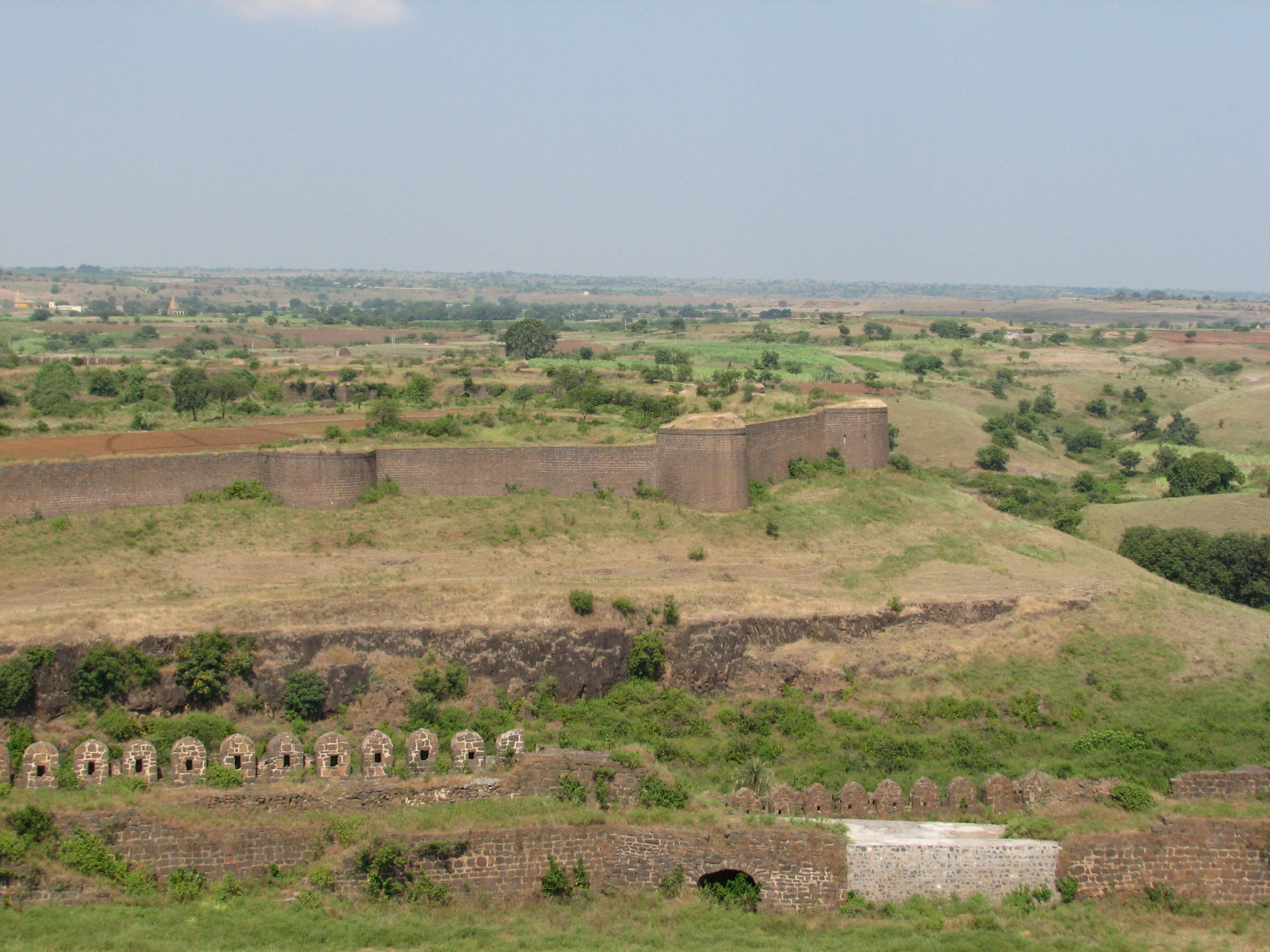
- Shiva temple in Dharashiv Caves; View from Naldurg Fort

- Location in Maharashtra
- Osmanabad district
- Country: India
- State: Maharashtra
- Division: Aurangabad
- Headquarters: Osmanabad
- Tehsils: Osmanabad Tahsil; Tuljapur; Omerga; Lohara; Kalamb; Bhoom; Paranda; Washi

Government
  - Body: Osmanabad Zilla Parishad
  - Guardian Minister: Tanaji Sawant (Cabinet Minister MH)
  - President Z. P. Osmanabad: Ranajagjitsinha Patil (BJP)
  - District Collector: Sachin Ombase (IAS)
  - CEO Z. P. Osmanabad: Rahul Gupta (IAS)
  - MPs: Omraje Nimbalkar (Osmanabad)

Area
  - Total: 7,569 km^{2} (2,922 sq mi)

Population (2011)
  - Total: 1,657,576
  - Density: 219.0/km^{2} (567.2/sq mi)

Demographics
  - Literacy: 76.33%
  - Sex ratio: 920
- Time zone: UTC+05:30 (IST)
- Major highways: National Highway 52, National Highway 65, National Highway 361
- Average annual precipitation: 760.40 mm
- Website: dharashiv.maharashtra.gov.in

Osmanabad district (pronunciation: [usmaːnabaːd̪]) (Transliteration: Usmanabad Jil'hā), officially known as Dharashiv district, is an administrative district in the Marathwada region in the Indian state of Maharashtra. The district headquarters are located at Osmanabad. The District of Osmanabad derives its name from the last ruler of Hyderabad, the 7th Nizam, Mir Osman Ali Khan, under whose rule the region was part till 1947. The region was part of the Hyderabad State until independence. This primarily rural district occupies an area of 7,569 km^{2} (2,922 sq mi), of which 241.4 km^{2} (93.2 sq mi) is urban, and has a population of 1,657,576, of which 16.96% were urban (as of 2011).

== Geography ==
=== Location ===
Osmanabad district lies in the southern part of the state. It lies on the Deccan plateau, about 600 m above sea level. Parts of the Sina, Manjira, and Terna Rivers flow through the district. The district's location on the south side of the Marathwada region is between latitudes 17.35 and 18.40 degrees north, and latitudes 75.16 to 76.40 degrees east.

Osmanabad district is bordered by the Beed district to the north, Latur district to the east, Solapur district to the west, Ahmednagar district to the north-west and the Bidar and Kalaburagi districts of the state of Karnataka to the south. Most of the district lies in the hilly areas of the Balaghat Range.

=== Climate ===
The rainy season starts from mid-June and continues till the end of September. The climate is humid in October and November and dry and cool from mid-November to January. From February to June, the climate is dry and becomes increasingly hot. During the summer, the temperature of Osmanabad district is low compared to the other districts of the Marathwada region. The average annual rainfall in the district is 760.40 mm. Temperature Max.: 42.1 °C; Min.: 8 °C

== Demographics ==
Historical population
Year	Pop.	±% p.a.
1901	387,122	—
1911	460,516	+1.75%
1921	442,156	−0.41%
1931	492,845	+1.09%
1941	547,945	+1.07%
1951	603,273	+0.97%
1961	726,036	+1.87%
1971	928,227	+2.49%
1981	1,029,702	+1.04%
1991	1,276,327	+2.17%
2001	1,486,586	+1.54%
2011	1,657,576	+1.09%

Religions in Osmanabad district (2011)
Religion	Percent
Hinduism	86.73%
Islam	10.79%
Buddhism	1.70%
Other or not stated	0.78%

In the 2011 census, Osmanabad district had a population of 1,657,576, roughly equal to the nation of Guinea-Bissau or the US state of Idaho. This gave it a ranking of 298th among the districts of India (out of a total of 640). The district had a population density of 219 inhabitants per square kilometre (570/sq mi). Its population growth rate over the decade 2001-2011 was 11.69%. The sex ratio was 920 females for every 1000 males, and the literacy rate was 76.33%. 16.96% of the population lived in urban areas. Scheduled Castes and Scheduled Tribes made up 16.00% and 2.17% of the population, respectively.

Languages of Osmanabad district (2011)
1. Marathi (85.4%)
2. Hindi (5.89%)
3. Urdu (4.25%)
4. Lambadi (2.06%)
5. Others (2.38%)

At the time of the 2011 Census of India, 85.42% of the population in the district spoke Marathi, 5.89% Hindi, 4.25% Urdu, and 2.04% Lambadi as their first language.

== History ==
=== History of Maharashtra ===
Before the independence of India, Osmanabad was under the Princely State of the Nizams. Later, it was the District of Gulbarga Division of Hyderabad State (1948–1956). In 1960, the Marathwada Region merged into the newly created state of Maharashtra.

== Government and politics ==
=== Politics ===
The Shivsena (SHS), Congress (IND), NCP, BJP, and BSP are the major political parties in Osmanabad district.

Osmanabad's representation in the Indian Parliament (Lok Sabha) is through the Osmanabad constituency, which also includes a part of northern Solapur district (Barshi) and a part of southern Latur district (Ausa). Currently, the member of parliament from the Osmanabad Lok Sabha constituency is Omprakash Raje Nimbalkar. The Osmanabad constituency is formed by six assembly constituencies, including Osmanabad, Omerga, Tuljapur, and Paranda Boom from Osmanabad district, Barshi from Solapur district, and Ausa from Latur district.

There are four constituencies for the Maharashtra Legislative Assembly (Vidhan Sabha): the Paranda constituency, Osmanabad constituency, Tuljapur constituency, and Umarga constituency.

=== Posts ===
==== Members of Parliament ====
Omraje Nimbalkar (SHS (UBT))
(Osmanabad)

==== Guardian Minister ====
Guardian Minister Osmanabad
- Emblem of India
- Incumbent; Tanaji Sawant since 24 September 2022
- Style: The Honourable
- Appointer: Chief Minister of Maharashtra
- Term length: 5 years / No time limit
- Website: osmanabad.gov.in/en/

===== List of guardian ministers =====
Name	Term of office
Deepak Sawant	31 October 2014 - 7 January 2019
Subhash Desai (additional charge)	7 January 2019 - 16 June 2019
Jaydutt Kshirsagar	16 June 2019 - 8 November 2019
Shankarrao Gadakh	9 January 2020 - 29 June 2022
Tanaji Sawant	24 September 2022 - Incumbent

==== District magistrate / collector ====
District Magistrate / Collector Osmanabad
- Emblem of India
- Incumbent; Sachin Ombase (IAS) since 6 January 2023
- Residence: At Osmanabad district
- Appointer: Government of Maharashtra
- Term length: No time limit
- Website: osmanabad.gov.in/en/

===== List of district magistrates / collectors =====
Name	Term of office
Kaustubh Diwegaonkar	2019 - 6 January 2023
Sachin Ombase (IAS)	6 January 2023 - incumbent

=== Tahsils ===
There are eight talukas (tahsils) in Osmanabad district.

- Bhoom
- Kalamb
- Lohara
- Omerga
- Osmanabad
- Paranda
- Tuljapur
- Vashi

Paranda is a historical place known for the Paranda Fort.

Tuljapur is a major taluka town, about 45 km from Solapur, 25 km from Osmanabad town and 40 km from Hyderabad National Highway at Naldurga.

Tuljapur is best known for its Tulja Bhavani Mandir. It is believed that Tulja Bhavani Mata had offered a sword to Shivaji (not verifiable), and his son Sambhaji had rebuilt the temple. The Tata Institute of Social Sciences, Mumbai also has a School of Rural Development (the "Rural Campus") at Tuljapur.

Omerga is a densely populated taluka in Osmanabad.

Kalamb is a major taluka, 55 km from the district's headquarters in Osmanabad. Kalamb city is an old city with the river Manjara flowing nearby. The major APMC market is the main attraction. The taluka is blessed by Yedeshwari Devi, whose temple is located at Yermala, 25 km from Kalamb.

== Transport ==
=== Railways ===
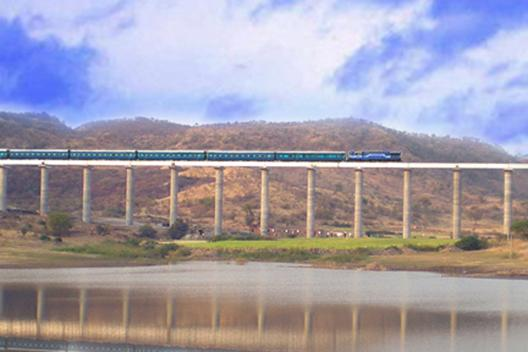
A railway bridge near Osmanabad railway station

A small portion of the Barshi light railway, connecting Latur-Barshi-Kurduvadi, passed through the northern fringe of Osmanabad district until 2007. The rail track was converted to a broad gauge, and the track alignment was changed southwards to pass near Osmanabad town. The modified track from Latur to Osmanabad opened for traffic in September 2007. The modified rail track from Osmanabad to Kurduvadi junction became operational in October 2008 and connects Osmanabad to Pune and Mumbai by a shorter rail route than via Latur. The North Indian regions are also connected by this new track. Railway service is available for Nagpur to Kolhapur, Miraj to Parli, Pandharpur to Nizamabad, Pune to Hyderabad, Pune to Amaravati, and Pune to Nizamabad via Osmanabad station. Osmanabad is well connected with Mumbai, Pune, Latur, Parbhani, Nanded, Amravati, Nagpur, Kolhapur, Miraj, and Parli.

Osmanabad station comes under the Central Railway (CR) zone.

=== National Highways ===
The National Highways that pass through the Osmanabad district are listed below:
1. NH-52: Sangrur (Punjab) - Hisar (Haryana) - Kota (Rajasthan) - Indore (Madhya Pradesh) - Dhule - Aurangabad - Beed - Osmanabad - Tuljapur - Solapur-Vijayapura - Hubballi - Ankola (Karnataka)
(The villages from Osmanabad district on NH-52 are Pargaon, Kunthalgiri Phata, Terkheda, Yermala-Yedshi, Osmanabad, Tuljapur, Tamalwadi)
2. NH-63: Barshi - Yedshi - Dhoki - Murud - Latur - Udgir - Deglur - Nizamabad (Telangana) - Sironcha (Maharashtra) - Jagdalpur(Chhattisgarh) - Kotpad (Odisha) - Borigumma
3. NH-65: Pune - Indapur - Solapur - Omerga - Hyderabad - Vijayawada - Machilipatnam (Andhra Pradesh)
(The villages from Osmanabad district on NH-65 are Itkal, Anadur, Naldurg, Jalkot, Yenegur, Dalimb, Omerga, Turori)
4. NH-361: Tuljapur - Latur - Ahmedpur - Nanded - Yavatmal - Wardha - Butibori (Near Nagpur)
5. NH-548B: Mantha - Selu - Pathari - Sonpeth - Parali - Ambajogai - Latur - Ausa - Omerga - Yenegur - Murum - Alur - Akkalkot - Nagansur - Vijayapura - Athani - Chikhodi - Sankeshwar - Gotur (Karnataka)
6. NH-548C: Satara - Koregaon - Mhaswad - Malshiras - Akluj - Tembhurni - Barshi - Yermala - Kalamb - Kej - Majalgaon - Partur - Mantha - Lonar - Mehkar - Khamgaon - Shegaon - Akot - Anjangaon - Betul (Madhya Pradesh)
7. NH-652: Tuljapur - Naldurg - Hannur - Akkalkot

=== Airways ===
Osmanabad Airport is located 10 kilometres north of Osmanabad and does not have any commercial air traffic. Reliance Airport Developers, who won a bid in 2009 to run the airport on a 95-year lease, plan to use this airport for aviation training. The nearest operational airports are Aurangabad Airport and Nanded Airport.

== See also ==
- Marathwada
