= National Highway 65 (India) =

National highway in India

National Highway 65
- Map of National Highway 65 in red
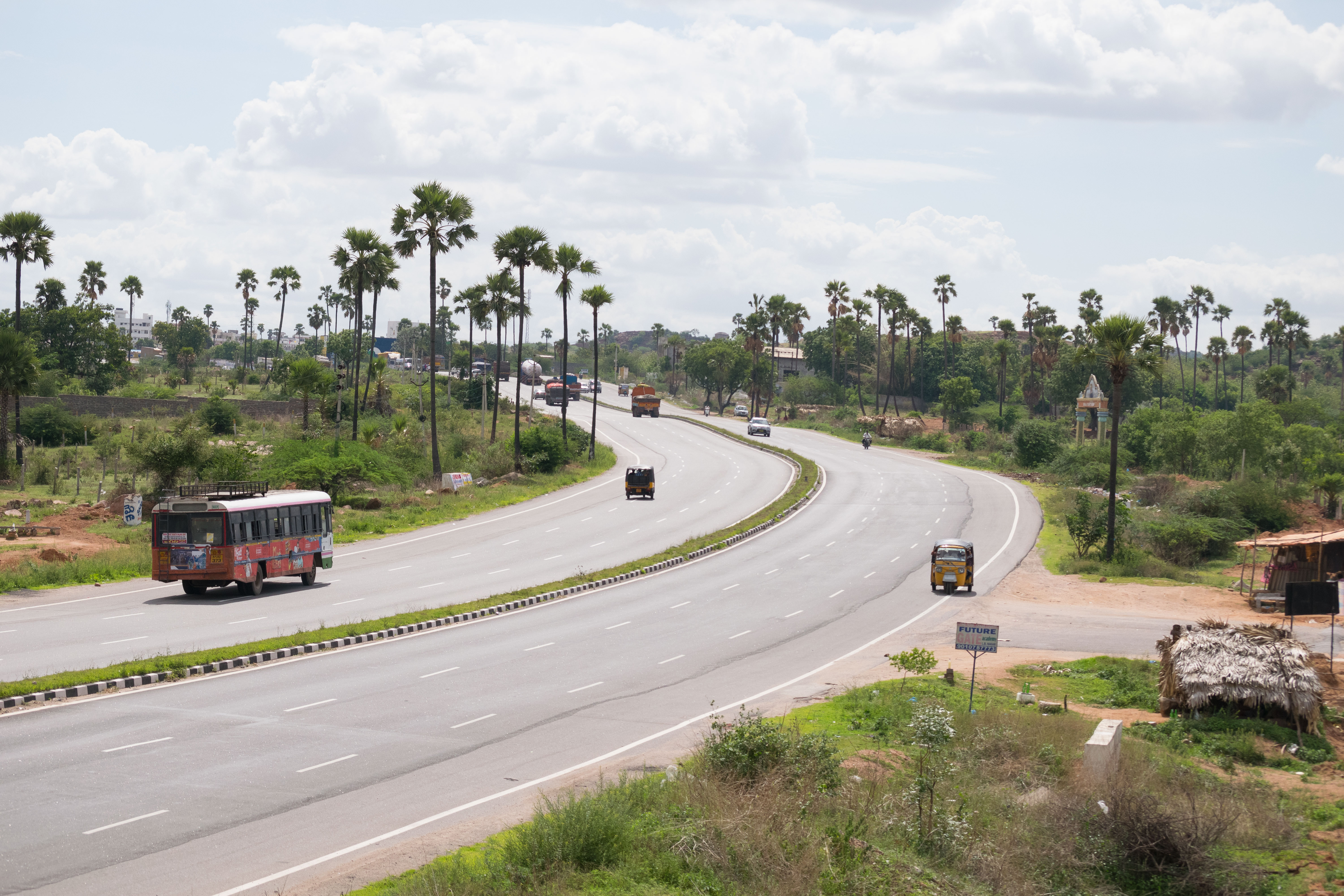
- National Highway 65 near Ramoji Film City, Hyderabad

Route information
- Length: 926 km (575 mi)

Major junctions
- West end: Pune, Maharashtra
- NH 48 in Pune; NH 52 in Solapur; NH 61 in Solapur; NH 50 in Humnabad, Bidar District, Karnataka; NH 44 in Hyderabad; NH 163 in Hyderabad; NH 365B in Suryapet; NH 365BB in Suryapet; NH 167 in Kodad; NH 16 in Vijayawada; NH 165 in Pamarru; NH 216 in Machilipatnam
- East end: Machilipatnam, Andhra Pradesh

Location
- Country: India
- States: Maharashtra: 349.20 KM; Karnataka: 75.61 KM; Telangana: 276.80 KM; Andhra Pradesh: 150.05 KM
- Primary destinations: Pune - Solapur - Omerga - Humnabad - Zaheerabad - Hyderabad - Suryapet-Kodad - Nandigama - Vijayawada - Machilipatnam

Highway system
- Roads in India; Expressways; National; State; Asian
← NH 64	→ NH 66

National Highway 65 (NH 65), (previous name National Highway 9), is a National Highway in India. It runs along the states of Maharashtra, Karnataka, Telangana and Andhra Pradesh. It starts at Pune and ends at Machilipatnam. Major cities on this route are Pune, Solapur, Hyderabad, Suryapet, Vijayawada and Machilipatnam. The section between Hyderabad and Vijayawada, is known as Vijayawada–Hyderabad Expressway and is a major expressway.

== Route ==
The NH 65 passes through below cities and towns, in the order of travel from west to east:

Maharashtra (349.20 km)

- Pune
- Hadapsar (Suburb of Pune)
- Loni Kalbhor
- Bhigwan
- Indapur
- Tembhurni
- Mohol
- Solapur
- Naldurg
- Yenegur
- Omerga

Karnataka (75.61 km)

- Humnabad
- Mannaekhalli

Telangana (276.80 km)

- Zahirabad
- Sadasivpet
- Sangareddy
- Rudraram
- Hyderabad
- Choutuppal
- Chityal
- Narketpally
- Nakrekal
- Suryapet
- Munagala
- Kodad

Andhra Pradesh (150.05 km)

- Nandigama
- Kanchikacherla
- Vijayawada
- Pamarru
- Machilipatnam

== Vijayawada–Hyderabad Expressway ==
Vijayawada-Hyderabad Expressway

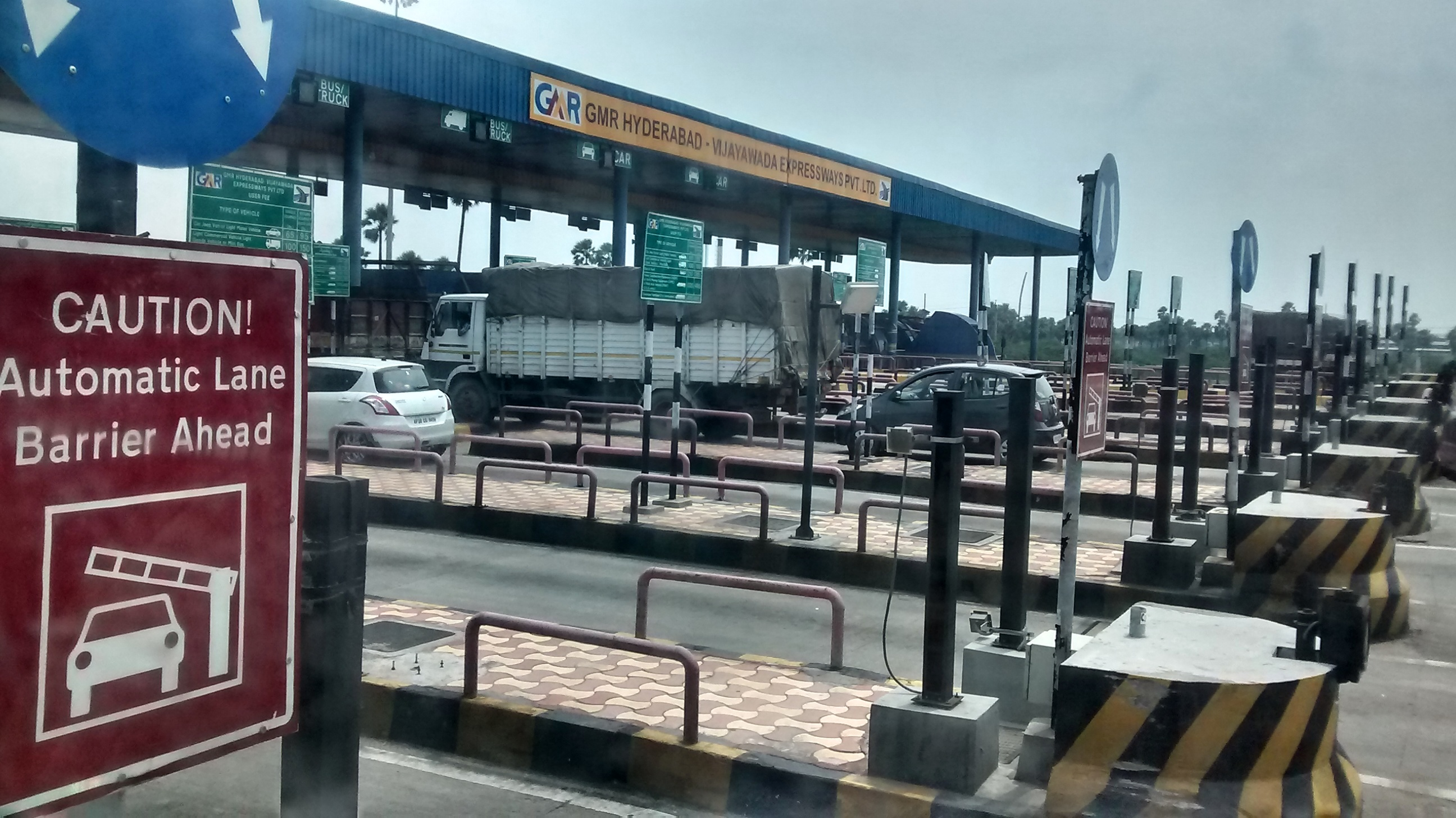
- A view of a Toll Gate on Vijayawada–Hyderabad Expressway near Nandigama, Andhra Pradesh

Route information
- Maintained by National Highways Authority of India (NHAI)
- Length: 247 km (153 mi)
- Existed: October 2012–present

Major junctions
- East end: Gollapudi, Vijayawada, Andhra Pradesh
- West end: Outer Ring Road, Hyderabad, Telangana

Location
- Country: India
- States: Andhra Pradesh and Telangana
- Districts: Krishna, Suryapet, Nalgonda, Yadadri Bhuvanagiri, Medchal–Malkajgiri, Ranga Reddy, Hyderabad
- Major cities: Suryapet
- Towns: Nandigama, Kodad, Nakrekal, Chityala, Choutuppal
- Villages: Paritala, Kanchikacherla, Narketpally

Highway system
- Roads in India; Expressways; National; State; Asian

Vijayawada–Hyderabad Expressway is a 247 km long, 4/6 lane wide tolled expressway that connects Vijayawada in Andhra Pradesh with Hyderabad in Telangana. It is one of the busiest expressways in India and is a part of National Highway 65. It was opened for public in October 2012. The project was undertaken by concessionaire GMR Hyderabad Vijayawada Expressways Private Limited, a subsidiary of GMR Group on a Build-Own-Operate-Transfer (BOOT) basis.

=== History ===
In early 2007, National Highways Authority of India (NHAI) has decided to expand the existing two-lane into a four-lane of Vijayawada-Hyderabad section. The project has also been sanctioned in 2007. But, due to technical issues, the project was delayed. Then in 2009, bids were announced by the NHAI. Five bidders were finalized for the construction of the roadway.

GMR Group, one of the 5 bidders for the project got the bid at a concession period of 25 years and incorporated a subsidiary, GMR Hyderabad Vijayawada Expressways Private Limited on 11 June 2009 for this work. The project was completed under this subsidiary.

=== Construction ===
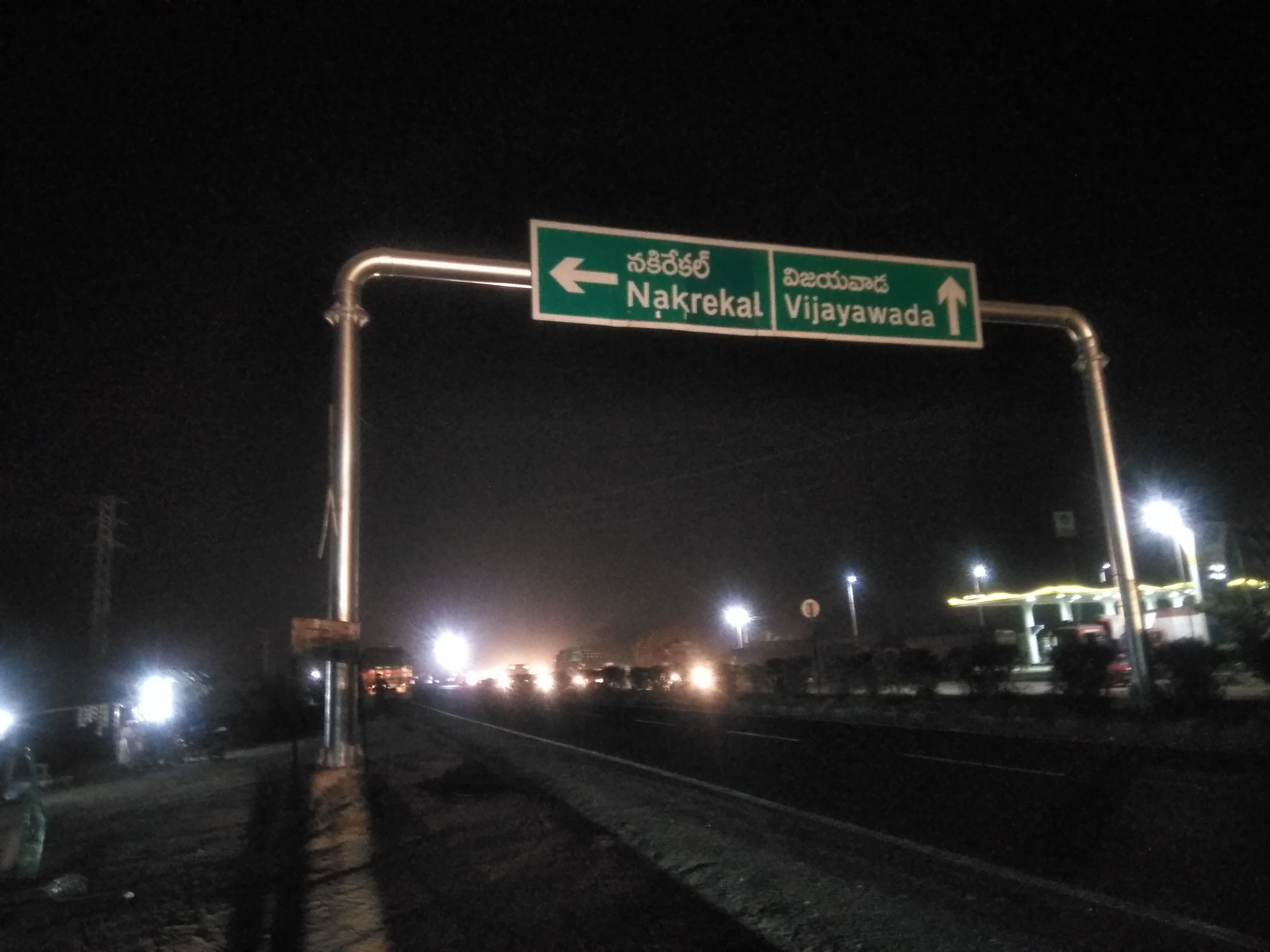
Night View of the expressway

The project was started on 22 March 2010 with an estimated cost ₹14.70 billion. The laying foundation ceremony was held at Narketpally attended by then Chief Minister of Andhra Pradesh, Konijeti Rosaiah, Jaipal Reddy and Ratanjit Pratap Narain Singh. Earlier, three toll gates were set up, whereas now, there are four. The project was completed in October 2012.

=== Importance ===
After the Bifurcation of Andhra Pradesh, the expressway became a major roadway connecting Hyderabad, capital of Telangana and Vijayawada, capital of Andhra Pradesh. The expressway became a major hub for various businesses. Industrial parks, pharma sectors and other corridors were proposed by both Government of Telangana and Government of Andhra Pradesh.

=== Exits ===
State	Location
Andhra Pradesh	Ibrahimpatnam
Andhra Pradesh	Kanchikacherla
Andhra Pradesh	Nandigama
Andhra Pradesh	Chillakallu
Telangana	Kodad
Telangana	Suryapet
Telangana	Narketpally
Telangana	Chaderghat

=== Inter-connectivity ===
Following will either connect or act as an alternative to the Vijayawada–Hyderabad Expressway:

- Mumbai–Nagpur Expressway will connect to expressway will connect to Vijayawada–Hyderabad Expressway at Nagpur.
- Jalna–Nanded Expressway will also provide direct connectivity between Vijayawada–Hyderabad Expressway (at Hydrabad) and Mumbai–Nagpur Expressway (at Jalna).
- Nagpur–Vijayawada Expressway is part of Nagpur–Vijayawada Economic Corridor which will connect Nagpur-Chandrapur (part greenfield) to Mancherial–Warangal (greenfield), Warangal–Khammam (greenfield), Khammam–Vijayvada (part greenfield). The tenders were issued in November 2022, would be likely completed by the end of 2024 or mid 2025.
- Hyderabad–Indore Expressway via Nanded–Akola-Omkareshwar–Indore, which will further connect to Delhi–Mumbai Expressway via Kota–Indore Expressway (136 km).
- Raipur–Visakhapatnam Expressway will be an alternative to the Vijayawada Hyderabad Expressway for the access to various ports across the Western Ghats in Bay of Bengal.

== See also ==
- List of national highways in India
- List of national highways in India by state
- National Highways Development Project
