= Mantha, Jalna =

Mantha मंठा
- Town
- Location in Maharashtra, India
- Coordinates: 19°38′48″N 76°23′07″E
- Country: India
- State: Maharashtra
- District: Jalna

Government
  - Body: Nagar panchayat
  - Nagar Adhyaksh (नगर अध्यक्ष): Balasaheb Borade

Population (2011)
  - Total: 22,005

Languages
  - Official: Marathi
- Time zone: UTC+5:30 (IST)
- PIN: 431504
- Vehicle registration: MH-21
- Literacy: 77%

Mantha is a town in Jalna district in the state of Maharashtra, India.

== Demography ==
Mantha tehsil has 114 villages under its supervision. According to 2011 census, Mantha plus 114 villages has population of 1,67,022. Among this 51% are male while 49% are female. SC population is 16% while ST population is around 3%. Literacy is 61%.

Mantha village, according to 2011 census, has a population of 22,005, of which 11,393 are male and 10,612 are female. Literacy is 76.86%, male literacy is 84.26% and female literacy is 69.01%. Total houses are 4210.

== Politics ==
- Though Mantha is in Jalna district, it comes under Parbhani Loksabha Constituency for Lok Sabha or General Elections of India. Current Member of Parliament is Sanjay(Bandu) Jadhav of Shiv Sena party.
- Mantha comes under Partur-Mantha constituency for Legislative Assembly elections of Maharashtra. Current Member of Legislative Assembly (MLA) from this area is Babanrao Lonikar of [Bhartiya Janata Party].

== Culture ==
- Mantha has mixed culture, here people of different cultures lives together. People of different communities like Muslims, Marathas, Banjaras, Buddhists etc. are found in large numbers.
- Renuka Mata Temple is main temple of the town, it also attracts people from other surrounding villages. Goddess Renuka has been known as "Goddess of the Town". The shrine is located on a small hillock north of the town.
- Friday is the day of weekly market in Mantha, this day is regarded as big day or important day in Mantha. People from small villages around comes to Mantha for their weekly shopping. Place of weekly market is in between Bus stand and Government Rural Hospital(RH).

== Places to Visit ==
1. Renuka Mata Mandir.

== Transportation ==
=== Road ===
Mantha is well connected to Jalna, Chhatrapati Sambhaji Nagar, Akola, Nanded, Latur, Pune, and Hyderabad by road. Mantha has a Bus Stand, operated by MSRTC. It is the main hub of transportation.

=== Rail ===
The nearest rail stations are Partur and Sailu.

=== Air ===
The nearest airports are the Chikhalthana Airport in Chhatrapati Sambhaji Nagar, which is 120 km and Nanded Airport, which is 134 km from Mantha.
