= Tuljapur taluka =

Tuljapur Tahsil
- tehsil
- Location in Maharashtra, India
- Coordinates: 17°51′N 076°09′E
- Country: India
- State: Maharashtra
- District: Osmanabad

Population (2011)
  - Total: 279,277

Languages
  - Official: Marathi
- Time zone: UTC+5:30 (IST)
- PIN: 413601
- Lok Sabha constituency: Osmanabad
- Vidhan Sabha constituency: Tuljapur

Tuljapur Tahsil is a tahsil/taluka (subdistrict) in Osmanabad district, Maharashtra on the Deccan Plateau of India. The town of Tuljapur is the administrative headquarters of the tahsil. There are 107 panchayat villages in Tuljapur Tahsil.

== Demographics ==
In the 2001 Indian census, Tuljapur Tahsil had a population of 250,149, with 129,622 (51.8%) males and 120,527 (48.2%) females, for a gender ratio of 930 females per thousand males. The tahsil was 80.9% rural in 2001.

In the 2011 census, Tuljapur Tahsil had 279,277 inhabitants and a gender ratio of 919 females per thousand males. The tahsil was 81.2% rural. The literacy rate in 2011 was 75.66% overall in Tuljapur Tahsil, with a rate of 84.53% for males and 66.06% for females. In 2011 in Tuljapur Tahsil, 12.3% of the population was 0 to 6 years of age.

== Towns and villages ==
There are two towns in Tuljapur Tahsil, Taljapur and Naldurg, both of which have municipal councils. Among the eighty-seven villages in the tahsil are:

- Andur
- Apsinga
- Dindegaon
- Barul
- Bhatambri
- Chivari
- Devkuruli
- Dhotri
- Jalkot
- Kamtha
- Khadki
- Kakramba
- Katgaon
- Kati
- Khudawadi
- Khuttewadi
- Kilaj
- Lohagaon
- Malumbra
- Mangrul
- Masala(Khu)
- Nilegaon
- Pangardharwadi
- Pimpala (Khu)
- Sangavi Kati
- Sawargaon
- Shahapur
- Suratgaon
- Tamalwadi
- Wadgaon Kati
- Wadgaon lakh
