= Sonpeth =

- Municipality
- Location in Maharashtra, India
- Coordinates: 19°1′34″N 76°28′18″E
- Country: India
- State: Maharashtra
- District: Parbhani

Government
  - Type: Municipal council
  - Body: SMC
- Elevation: 437 m (1,434 ft)

Population (2011)
  - Total: 15,765
- Demonym: Sonpethkar

Languages
  - Official: Marathi
- Time zone: UTC+5:30 (IST)
- PIN code: 431516
- Vehicle registration: MH-22
- Website: parbhani.gov.in

Sonpeth is a city and a municipal council in Parbhani district in the Indian state of Maharashtra.

== Demographics ==
As of 2011 India census, Sonpeth has population of 15,765 of which 8,120 are males while 7,645 are females. Female Sex Ratio is of 942 higher than Maharashtra state average of 929. 13.5% of the population is under 6 years of age.

Literacy rate of Sonpeth city is 74.86% lower than state average of 82.34%. In Sonpeth, Male literacy is around 82.45% while female literacy rate is 66.94%.

Schedule Caste (SC) constitutes 12.40% while Schedule Tribe (ST) were 0.64% of total population in Sonpeth.

== Transport ==
Sonpeth is located 55 km (34 mi) to the west of the district headquarters, Parbhani.

Parli 22 km (14 mi), Ambajogai 45 km (28 mi) , Beed 79 km (49 mi) , Dharur 55 km (34 mi) , Pathri 33 km (21 mi) , Majalgaon 45 km (28 mi) , Manwath 41 km (25 mi) are the nearby cities to Sonpeth.

Major city chhatrapati sambhajinagar is 171 km (106 mi) and Nanded is 109 km (68 mi) from Sonpeth.

== Governance ==
Sonpeth comes under Parbhani (Lok Sabha constituency) for Indian general elections and current member of Parliament representing this constituency is Sanjay Haribhau Jadhav of Shiv Sena.

Sonpeth comes under Pathri (Vidhan Sabha constituency) for assembly elections of Maharashtra. Current representative from this constituency in Maharashtra state assembly is Suresh Warpudkar who was Indian National Congress.

== Climate ==
Climate data for Sonpeth
Month	Jan	Feb	Mar	Apr	May	Jun	Jul	Aug	Sep	Oct	Nov	Dec	Year
Mean daily maximum °C (°F)	30.0 (86.0)	32.0 (89.6)	35.4 (95.7)	38.5 (101.3)	40.0 (104.0)	34.7 (94.5)	27.8 (82.0)	27.5 (81.5)	30.5 (86.9)	31.6 (88.9)	30.0 (86.0)	28.0 (82.4)	33.7 (92.7)
Mean daily minimum °C (°F)	11.2 (52.2)	13.6 (56.5)	17.0 (62.6)	22.7 (72.9)	24.4 (75.9)	23.5 (74.3)	22.3 (72.1)	21.8 (71.2)	20.4 (68.7)	18.0 (64.4)	14.3 (57.7)	11.0 (51.8)	20.2 (68.4)
Average precipitation mm (inches)	5.1 (0.20)	6.0 (0.24)	9.7 (0.38)	9.2 (0.36)	23.4 (0.92)	145.0 (5.71)	238.1 (9.37)	265.9 (10.47)	184.3 (7.26)	73.8 (2.91)	16.1 (0.63)	10.6 (0.42)	957.2 (37.69)
Source: IMD
