= Naldurg =

- town
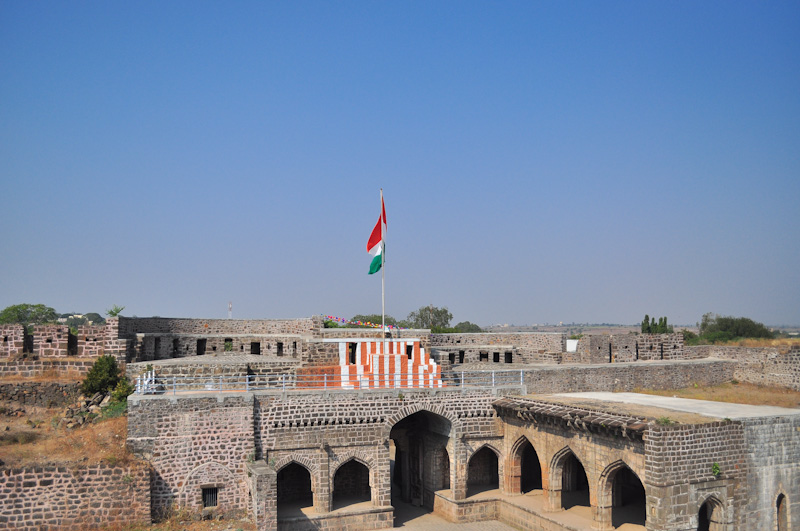
- Hulmukh Darwaza, Naldurg fort

- Location in Maharashtra, India
- Coordinates: 17.82°N 76.3°E
- Country: India
- State: Maharashtra
- District: dharashiv
- Elevation: 566 m (1,857 ft)

Population (2011)
  - Total: 18,341

Languages
  - Official: Marathi
- Time zone: UTC+5:30 (IST)
- Sex ratio: 52%/48% ♂/♀

Naldurg is a historic city and municipal council located in the Dharashiv district of the state of Maharashtra, India. It is known for its prominent Naldurg Fort, one of the most impressive medieval forts in the region, built during the Bahmani and Adil Shahi periods. Situated near the confluence of the Bori river, Naldurg holds strategic and historical significance due to its fortifications, architecture, and cultural heritage. The city serves as a local administrative and commercial hub, with agriculture and small-scale industries forming the backbone of its economy. It is well-connected to major cities like Solapur and Dharashiv through road networks.

== Geography ==
Naldurg is located at 17.82°N 76.3°E, 438 km from Mumbai.50 km from Solapur city It has an area of 7550 km^{2} and average elevation of 566 metres (1856 feet). The temperature ranges from 10.1 °C to 43.1 °C, and the average yearly rainfall is 760mm.

== Demographics ==
As of 2011 India census, Naldurg had a population of 18,341. Males constitute 52% of the population and females 48%. Naldurg has an average literacy rate of 84.10%, higher than the state average of 82.34%. Male literacy is 90%, and female literacy is 78%. In Naldurg, 15% of the population is under 6 years of age. Schedule Caste (SC) constitutes 11.61% while Schedule Tribe (ST) were 0.95% of total population in Naldurg.

== See also ==
- Naldurg Fort
