= Murum, Osmanabad =

Murum Moram
- town
- Location in Maharashtra, India
- Coordinates: 17°47′16″N 76°28′12″E
- Country: India
- State: Maharashtra
- District: Osmanabad
- Tahsil: Umarga
- Elevation: 548 m (1,798 ft)

Population (2011)
  - Total: 18,472

Languages
  - Official: Marathi
- Time zone: UTC+5:30 (IST)

Murum is a town with a municipal council in Osmanabad district in the Indian state of Maharashtra.

== Geography ==
It has an elevation of on average of 548 metres (1797 feet).

== Demographics ==
In the 2011 census, Murum had a population of 18,472. Marathi is the official language but Kannada is most widely spoken language of the town. Urdu is also spoken by some.

Religions in Murum
Religion	Percent
Hindus	66%
Muslims	19%
Buddhists	10.6%
Christians	0.4%
Jains	3.7%
Others†	0.3%
Distribution of religions †Includes Sikhs (0.2%), Buddhists (<0.2%).
