= Osmanabad =

- City
- Dharashiv
- Osmanabad in Maharashtra
- Coordinates: 18°11′7.935″N 76°2′30.741″E
- Country: India
- State: Maharashtra
- Region: Marathwada
- District: Osmanabad
- Named for: Mir Osman Ali Khan; Dharashiv Caves

Government
  - Type: Municipal Council
  - Body: Dharashiv Nagarpalika
  - Chairman: Makarand raje Nimbalkar
- Elevation: 653 m (2,142 ft)

Population (2011)
  - Total: 112,085
- Demonym(s): Osmanabadi, Dharashivkar

Language
  - Official: Marathi
- Time zone: UTC+5:30 (IST)
- PIN: 413501(City)
- Telephone code: (+91) 2472
- Vehicle registration: MH-25
- Website: dharashiv.maharashtra.gov.in

Osmanabad, officially known as Dharashiv, is a city and a municipal council in Osmanabad district in the Indian state of Maharashtra. It is the seventh largest city in Marathwada, and the 39th largest city in Maharashtra by population.

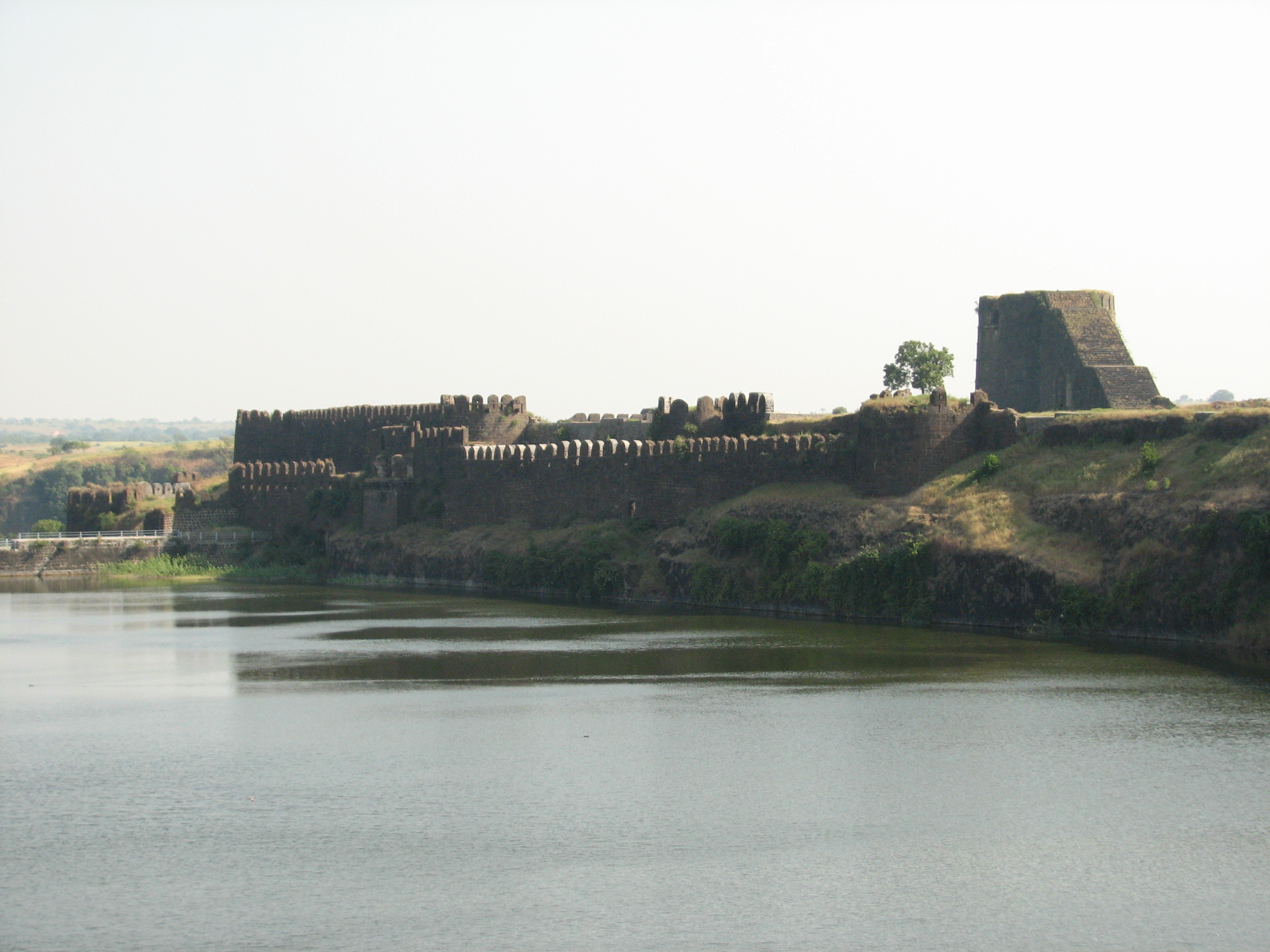
Naldurg Fort in Naldurg,Osmanabad district, Maharashtra

== Etymology and history ==
Osmanabad derives its name from the last ruler of Hyderabad, the 7th Nizam, Mir Osman Ali Khan, of which the region was a part of until 1948. As per historical evidence, the district was ruled by the Mauryas, Satavahanas, Rashtrakutas, and Yadavas. In early centuries the city belonged to the Hindu Chalukyas and Devagiri Yadavas, but later became a part of the Bahmani and Bijapur kingdoms.

Osmanabad was officially renamed Dharashiv in February 2023. The name derives from the Dharashiv Caves.

== Geography ==
The city of Osmanabad has an elevation of 653 metres (2,142 ft). Osmanabad is located in the west-central part of Osmanabad Tahsil. Nearby towns include Tuljapur, Bhoom, Paranda, Washi, and Kalamb. Solapur, located southwest of Osmanabad in Solapur district, is the nearest sizeable city. Osmanabad is on the Balaghat Pathar. The Bhogavati River flows through the city and meets the Sina River near Mohol in the Solapur district.

=== Climate ===
The climate of the Osmanabad district is generally dry. The rainy season starts from mid-June and continues until the end of September. From October to November, the climate is humid while from February to March the climate is dry. Winter runs from mid-November to January and summer from April to June. During summer the temperatures of Osmanabad district are low compared to other districts of the Marathwada region.

Climate data for Osmanabad (1991–2020, extremes 1976–2020)
Month	Jan	Feb	Mar	Apr	May	Jun	Jul	Aug	Sep	Oct	Nov	Dec	Year
Record high °C (°F)	35.2 (95.4)	38.6 (101.5)	43.7 (110.7)	43.9 (111.0)	45.1 (113.2)	43.9 (111.0)	35.6 (96.1)	34.2 (93.6)	35.2 (95.4)	39.4 (102.9)	35.6 (96.1)	35.4 (95.7)	45.1 (113.2)
Mean daily maximum °C (°F)	30.7 (87.3)	33.0 (91.4)	36.5 (97.7)	38.7 (101.7)	39.3 (102.7)	33.3 (91.9)	29.9 (85.8)	28.7 (83.7)	30.2 (86.4)	31.6 (88.9)	31.2 (88.2)	30.8 (87.4)	32.9 (91.2)
Mean daily minimum °C (°F)	14.5 (58.1)	16.5 (61.7)	20.6 (69.1)	23.0 (73.4)	23.9 (75.0)	21.8 (71.2)	20.9 (69.6)	20.1 (68.2)	20.3 (68.5)	19.4 (66.9)	16.5 (61.7)	13.9 (57.0)	19.3 (66.7)
Record low °C (°F)	7.6 (45.7)	10.2 (50.4)	12.4 (54.3)	14.1 (57.4)	16.4 (61.5)	14.2 (57.6)	15.4 (59.7)	14.6 (58.3)	13.6 (56.5)	10.0 (50.0)	9.0 (48.2)	8.1 (46.6)	7.6 (45.7)
Average rainfall mm (inches)	1.8 (0.07)	1.5 (0.06)	9.2 (0.36)	21.1 (0.83)	31.5 (1.24)	121.5 (4.78)	173.2 (6.82)	182.4 (7.18)	179.8 (7.08)	85.9 (3.38)	18.5 (0.73)	2.7 (0.11)	829.2 (32.65)
Average rainy days	0.4	0.1	0.7	1.9	2.3	7.7	10.3	11.2	8.6	4.8	1.2	0.3	49.5
Average relative humidity (%) (at 17:30 IST)	42	37	34	33	35	63	73	77	71	61	52	44	51
Source: India Meteorological Department

== Demographics ==
In the 2011 Indian census, the city of Osmanabad had 111,825 inhabitants, with 41,982 males (52.1%) and 38,643 females (47.9%), for a gender ratio of 920 females per one thousand males. In 2001, Osmanabad had an average literacy rate of 74%, higher than the national average of 59.5%. Male literacy was 80% and female literacy was 67%. In 2001, 14% of the population was under 6 years of age.

Religions in Osmanabad City (2011)
Religion	Percent
Hinduism	61%
Islam	24%
Buddhism	10.6%
Jainism	3.7%
Christianity	0.4%
Others†	0.3%
Distribution of religions †Includes Sikhs (0.2%), .

== Tourism ==
=== Dharashiv Caves ===
There are two groups of rock-cut caves in the city. The first is Chamar rock-cut caves and the other is the Dharashiv Rock-cut caves group. Chamar Caves are two km away from the city. There are two caves dedicated to Hinduism. According to Burgess, these are dated to the 6th century CE. There are six Dharashiva Caves. Four are of Jainas, and two are of Vaishnava caves. According to scholars, these caves dated to the 6th to 8th century CE.

Dharashiv Caves are four km (2.5 mi) from Osmanabad city and two km (1.2 mi) from Hatladevi Hill Station. Dharashiv Caves are dating back to 7th Century A.D. It is a major tourists attraction in Osmanabad. The Railway bridge near the tunnel near Osmanabad City is also becoming a tourist destination nowadays.

=== Other places ===
- Tuljapur: Tulajpur is home to Aai Tulja Bhavani, the most visited palace by devotees from all over Maharashtra.
- Naldurg Fort
- Paranda Fort: a protected monument by the Archaeological Survey Of India. It is an example of military architecture and engineering in Maharashtra and was erected by Mahmud Gawan Vazir of Bahamani Sultanate.
- Dhoki is a major village that is nearby Osmanabad
- Kond is the village that has the historical Bhimashankar Mandir. It is about 35 km (22 mi) from Osmanabad.
- Ter is the birthplace of Gora Kumbhar, having the historical Mandir. It is about 17 km (11 mi) from Osmanabad.
- Shri Datta Mandir Sansthan Ruibhar, Osmanabad: There is a temple of Lord Dattatreya amidst the quiet, serene natural surroundings at the village Ruibhar, 12 km (7.5 mi) from Osmanabad city.
- Hathladevi Temple, about two km (1.2 mi) from Osmanabad
- Shri Yedeshwari Temple, Yermala: In this temple, the architecture is in the Hemadpanti style. It has two entrance doors, in front of the principal one are three dipmals or lamp pillars, the central one being a little taller than the flanking ones. Supported on two rows of solid pillars, the mandap has two rooms at one end, with the vestibule at the other end. The vestibule contains an idol of the goddess with a brass prabhaval around and a small linga symbol nearby.

== Transport ==
=== Air ===
Osmanabad Airport lies about 13 kilometres (8.1 mi) from the city centre. There are no scheduled commercial air services to the airport. It takes about 15 to 20 minutes to reach the airport by car from the bus stand. Maharashtra Industrial Development Corporation has leased the airport to Reliance Airport Developers, Ltd. for 95 years. Reliance paid Rs. 63 crore in the agreement, which includes four other airports of Maharashtra. The nearest operational airports are Aurangabad Airport and Nanded Airport.

=== Rail ===
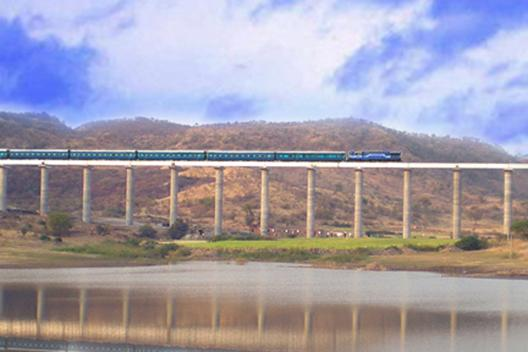
A railway bridge near Osmanabad Station

Osmanabad railway station (station code UMD) is an important railway station situated on Latur - Miraj railway route of the central railway. Before 2004, a narrow gauge track connecting Latur to Kurduvadi passed through the Osmanabad district. The station nearest to the city at Yedshi was 18 km (11 mi) away from Osmanabad City. During the conversion from narrow gauge to Broad Gauge, the track alignment was changed and directed towards Osmanabad City. In the first stage, the broad gauge track between Latur-Osmanabad was completed and became functional in 2007. The first train to arrive at Osmanabad railway station was the Mumbai-Osmanabad Express that ran via Aurangabad and Manmad. The Osmanabad-Kurudvadi section was completed and put into service in 2008. Latur-Osmanabad-Mumbai Express was started via Kurduvadi, Pune in 2008. Osmanabad railway station operates under the Solapur Mandal of Central Railway (CR) zone. On the line there are Many bridges and a Big Tunnel, about 1.5 km (0.93 mi) long near Osmanabad city.

Osmanabad has connections to Pune, Mumbai, Kolhapur, Sangli, Pandharpur, Nagpur, Parbhani, Latur, Nanded, Miraj, Parali Vaijnath, Hyderabad, and Nizamabad.

=== Road ===
National Highway 52 passes through Osmanabad city. This National Highway connects cities such as Sangrur (Punjab), Hisar, (Haryana), Kota (Rajasthan), Indore (Madhya Pradesh), Dhule, Aurangabad, Beed, Osmanabad, Tuljapur, Solapur, Vijayapura, Hubballi, and Ankola (Karnataka).

Maharashtra State Highway 67 also passes through Osmanabad City.

National Highway 65 passes through Omerga city. It also has a bypass to the city to avoid city traffic. It starts from Pune and runs until Vishakhapatnam.

== Education ==
Osmanabad has one Government BAMS College, known As Ayurvedic College, one Government Polytechnic College, Osmanabad Government Polytechnic College, Osmanabad (GPO), three private pharmacy colleges, and three private engineering colleges (Notably TPCT's College of Engineering, Osmanabad). Another engineering college in Osmanabad District is located in Tuljapur. The Tata Institute of Social Sciences, Mumbai, a university of international repute has begun a B.A., M.A., Mphil. and PhD program located in Tuljapur.
