= Lohara, Akola =

Lohara
- village
- Interactive map of Lohara
- Country: India
- State: Maharashtra
- District: Akola
- Founder: More Pravin Pralhad

Government
  - Type: Indian govt

Marathi, Hindi, Urdu,
  - Official: Marathi
- Time zone: UTC+5:30 (IST)
- Postal code: 444311
- Vehicle registration: MH-30
- Website: Wikimapia location

Lohara is a village in Balapur tehsil, Akola district Maharashtra in the India. It belongs to the Vidarbha region of Amravati Division.

== Location ==
Located 30 away from Akola District, 9 km away from Shegaon, Pin code of Lohara is 444311

Location in Wikimapia.

== Demographics ==
Marathi, Hindi and Urdu are the local languages. 7504 population of Lohara,

== Transport ==
=== Road ===
Lohara is 9 km away from Shegaon toward AKOT Road. Shegaon is the nearest town with railway station, around 9 km from Lohara.

=== Rail ===
Akola Jn Railway Station is major railway station 30 km near to Lohara. Shegaon Railway Station is nearest railway station, from Akola trains run more frequently.

== Schools ==
- Zilla Parishad Marathi Medium School
- Zilla Parishad Urdu Middle School
- Smt.Radhabai Bakal Vidyalaya
- Mastaniya Urdu High School
- Madrasa Banatus Salehat (Arabi Education)
- Hawwabai Girls Urdu School & Junior College
