= Tuljapur =

- city
- Location in Maharashtra, India
- Coordinates: 18.0085°N 76.0699°E
- Country: India
- State: Maharashtra
- District: Dharashiv
- Tahsil: Tuljapur
- Named after: Tulja Bhavani
- Elevation: 648 m (2,126 ft)

Population (2001)
  - Total: 31,714

Languages
  - Official: Marathi
- Time zone: UTC+5:30 (IST)
- Pin code: 413 601
- ISO 3166 code: IN-MH
- Lok Sabha constituency: Osmanabad
- Vidhan Sabha constituency: Tuljapur
- Website: tuljabhavani.in

Tuljapur is a town with a municipal council in Dharashiv District in the Indian state of Maharashtra. It is the administrative seat of Tuljapur taluka.

Tuljapur is the location of the annual Tulja Bhavani fair during Navaratri, i.e., in the months of September and October (the date varies). The town is home to the Tulja Bhavani Temple.

== Geography ==
It has an elevation of 648 metres (2125 feet).

== Demographics ==
As of 2001 India census, Tuljapur had a population of 31,714. Males constituted 52% of the population and females 48%. Tuljapur had an average literacy rate of 69%, higher than the national average of 59.5%: male literacy was 76%, and female literacy was 60%. In 2001 in Tuljapur, 14% of the population was under 6 years of age. Marathi is spoken here.

== Culture ==
The Tulja Bhavani Temple is dedicated to the Hindu goddess Bhavani. The town has received much notice during past centuries since the temple has always enjoyed a special association with the Bhosale clan to which Chhatrapati Shivaji belonged. Goddess Bhavani was the family deity of the Bhosale clan. As the Goddess Bhavani is the deity of many people from Maharashtra, they come walking in during the Dasara Festival to worship the Goddess Bhavani. Every year after Navaratri, on the eve of Kojagiri Poornima, many devotees cover long distances to reach the city. Huge crowds are drawn to the temple for worshipping the goddess Bhavani.

The temple-town of Pandharpur, the osmanabad caves, and the Naldurg Fort all lie within easy reach.

== Education ==
The city of Tuljapur is the centre for many government schools like Jawahar Navodaya Vidyalaya, Sainik School (which trains students for the army education). Colleges like Shree Tuljabhavani College of Engineering and many other colleges offering degree courses like Y. C. College, Tuljabhavani College, Kulswamini college are located here.

The school has both secondary and higher secondary education facilities. The aim is to inculcate a spirit of patriotism and encourage a career in the Armed Forces of India. The Tata Institute of Social Sciences, Mumbai, a deemed university of international repute has Off-Campus known as School of Rural Development at Tuljapur, and offers Master & PhD study programmes.

== Transport ==
Tuljapur has frequent buses from Solapur which is situated 45 km away and also from Osmanabad which is 25 km away. Nearest railway stations are in Solapur (45 km) and Osmanabad (25 km). also many of commercial vehicles are available to Hindu devotees who generally come at Navratri week. MSRTC provide ac Shivshahi bus service on Nashik, Pune, Kolhapur, etc. Tuljapur has frequent buses from Latur which is situated 71 km away and also from Pune which is 297 km away from Tuljapur. Frequent buses from Parbhani which is situated 228 km away and also from Nanded which is 206 km away from Tuljapur.
