= Umarga =

- Town
- Location in Maharashtra, India
- Coordinates: 17°50′24″N 76°37′18″E
- Country: India
- State: Maharashtra
- District: Osmanabad

Government
  - Type: State government and central government
  - Body: Nagar Palika
- Elevation: 572 m (1,877 ft)

Population (2011)
  - Total: 35,477

Languages
  - Official: Marathi
- Time zone: UTC+5:30 (IST)
- Postal code: 413 606
- ISO 3166 code: IN-MH
- Lok Sabha constituency: Osmanabad
- Vidhan Sabha constituency: Umarga
- Website: Npomerga.org.in

Umarga/Omerga is a town with a municipal council in the Osmanabad district in the Indian state of Maharashtra. It is an administrative headquarter of the Umarga Tehsil.

== Geography ==
The town of Umarga is situated near National highway 65 Pune-Solapur-Hyderabad-Machilipatnam.

== Demographics ==
In the 2011 census, the town of Umarga had a population of 35,609. The official language is Marathi.

Religions in Umarga
Religion	Percent
Hindus	76%
Muslims	10%
Buddhists	9.6%
Christians	0.4%
Jains	3.7%
Others†	0.3%
Distribution of religions †Includes Sikhs (0.2%), Buddhists (<0.2%).

== Industrial park ==
Umarga has a Maharashtra Industrial Development Corporation industrial park of 2500 hectares.
