= Peddamunigal =

- Amba Mai
- Location in Telangana Peddamunigal (India)

Religion
- Affiliation: Hinduism
- District: Nalgonda
- Deity: Tulja Bhavani

Location
- Location: Peddamunigal
- State: Telangana
- Country: India
- Coordinates: 16.5785877°N 79.0705561°E

Architecture
- Type: Dravidian

Peddamunigal, also known as Munigal, is a Hindu temple situated on the banks of the Krishna River back of Nagarjuna Sagar Dam. and surrounded with Nallamala Forest in Nalgonda district of the Indian state of Telangana. The Temple is said to be an abode of Bhavani.

Tuljapur is situated in Osmanabad district and is well known for Lord Shri. It is located on the hill of "Bala ghat," Tuljabhavani. The former name of Tuljapur was Chinchpur.

== Legend ==
Lord Tuljabhavani is a popular deity and also a family deity (Kul-daiwatall) across India. She is described as the impressive and formidable Goddess in Hindu Puranas, who is known to combat demons and evil forces and maintain the moral order and righteousness in the universe.

The temple is mentioned in the "skanda puran". A sage known as Kardabh had a wife Anubuti who performed a penance at the banks of Mandakini river for Bhavani mata to look after her infant child after the sage's death. While performing the penance, the demon known as Kukur tried to disturb her penance during which Mata Bhavani came to the aid of Anubuti and killed the demon.. From that day onwards the Goddess Bhavani came to be known as Tulja Bhavani. The same place is today known as Tuljapur. Nizam or Adhilshah both were not interfaced in religious Approximately 5000 people lived in Tuljapur around 1920.

== History ==
People of Peddamunigal started worshipping the goddess Bhavani in the early 1900s in a small hut built with cloth (Paal in native Lambada language). After few years Kethavath Hema Saukaar and the local people of the village came to a consensus and appointed a family to serve the goddess. Since then this family is called the Bhagath family. The Temple was constructed in the mid-1950s by Kethavath Chandru Naik with the cooperation of locals and the people of nearby villages. Daily prayers are performed to the goddess Bhavani by the Bhakath family.

Priests (Bhakaths)
Name	From	To
Laskar Bhagath	Early 1950s	
Chandu Bhagath	1980	1995
Laskar Bhagath (Jeevan)	1995	Current

=== Tulja Yaadi Jaatara --2016 ===
Allegedly, approximately 10,000 animal sacrifices happened to goddess Bhavani in the year 2016. The number of animal sacrifices have been increasing each year since 1985. People believe that by offering these sacrifices to the goddess Bhavani, she grants her devotees wishes of health and wealth.

Year	Month	Dates	Reference
2016	October	10 – 11	Dassara(Oct 10), Salendra(Oct 11)

== Transport ==
Peddamunigal is about 130 km (approx. 85 miles) from Hyderabad by Road. The nearest railway station is Nalgonda (about 60 km) for passenger trains. The nearest bus station is Deverakonda (about 30 km) for buses
