= Shakta Pithas in Maharashtra =

Hindu temples in India

Three and a half Shakta pithas (prominent worship centres of Hindu goddesses) are in Maharashtra.

These four temples are:

1. Mahalakshmi Temple, Kolhapur
2. Tulja Bhavani Temple at Tuljapur in Dharashiv district
3. Renuka Temple at Mahur (Matripur) in Nanded district
4. Saptashrungi Temple of Vani in Nashik district. This is known as a half Shakta pitha of Goddess Shakti.

== Mahalaxmi ==
The Mahalaxmi (also known as Ambabai) Temple situated in Kolhapur, Maharashtra, India, is one of the 18 Maha Shakta pithas listed in skanda puran, and one of 52 Shakta pithas according to various Puranas of Hinduism. According to these writings, a Shakta pitha is a place associated with Shakti, the Goddess of power. This is the place where maa Sati's 3 eyes fell. The Kolhapur Shakta pitha is of special religious significance being one of the six places where it is believed that one can either obtain salvation from desires or have them fulfilled. Kolhapur Peeth is also known as Karvir Peeth or Shree Peetham. Lakhs of devotees visit the temple every year, from all over Maharashtra, Karnataka and Telangana.

== Tulja Bhavani ==
Tulja Bhavani Temple is a Hindu temple dedicated to the goddess Durga. Goddess Durga lives here in her tulja bhavani form. She is also known as the adishakti. She is Maharashtra's guardian goddess [Maharastrachi kulaswamini] of Bharat. It is located in Tuljapur in Dharashiv district of Maharashtra and is considered as one of the 51 Shakta pithas. It is situated 45 km from Solapur. The temple was built in c. 12th century CE.

== Renuka ==
Reṇukā/Renu is a Hindu goddess worshipped predominantly in the Indian state of Maharashtra. It is one of the 18 Maha Shakta pithas."Renu" means "Atom/Mother of Universe" She is also worshipped in the South Indian states of Andhra Pradesh, Himachal Pradesh, Karanataka, Tamil Nadu, and Telangana. Renuka's temple at Mahur in Maharashtra is considered one of the Shakta pithas. Another temple of Renuka mata is in Konkan, also worshipped as Padmakshi Renuka. It is also Shakta pitha among 108 peethas but not considered in main 1/3 Shakta pithas of Maharashtra. Renuka is also called "Renu", which means "Atom/Mother of the Universe".

== Saptashrungi ==
Saptashrungi Saptaśrr̥ṇgī) is a site of Hindu pilgrimage situated 60 kilometres (37 mi) from Nashik in west Indian state of Maharashtra in India. According to Hindu traditions, the goddess Saptashrungi Nivasini dwells within the seven mountain peaks. (Sapta means seven and shrung means peaks.) It is located in Nanduri, Kalwan taluka, a small village near Nashik in India. Devotees visit this place in large numbers every day. The temple is also known popularly as one of the "three and half Shakta pithas" of Maharashtra. The temple is also one among the 51 Shakta pithas located on the Indian subcontinent and is a location where one of Sati's (first wife of Lord Shiva) limbs, her right arm is reported to have fallen. Its half Shakta pitha among three and half Shakta pithas of Maharashtra.

== See also ==
- Kalighat
- Renuka
- Saptashrungi
- Tulja Bhavani
- Yatra
