= Bhavani =

Hindu goddess

- Goddess of Power, Justice, Motherhood and Emotions
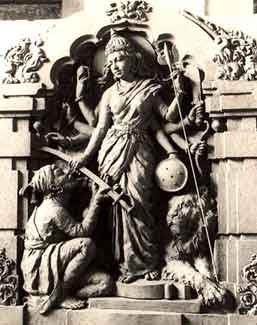
- Goddess Bhavānī presenting the Chandrahasa sword to Shivaji of Maratha Empire.
- Devanagari: भवानी
- Affiliation: Devi, Mahādevī, Durga, Shakti
- Abode: Devī Lōk
- Weapon: Bow and arrow, sword, gada, Sudarshana Chakra, conch shell, Trishula, lotus
- Mount: Tiger/Lion
- Consort: Shiva

Bhavānī (also known as Bhāvya, Tulajā, Turajā, Tvarita, Aṃbā, Jagadambā and Aṃbē) is an epithet associated with Durga. Bhavani translates to "giver of life", meaning the power of nature or the source of creative energy. She is considered to be a nurturing mother figure who provides for her devotees and also plays the role of dispensing justice by killing evil Asuras.

== Etymology ==
Bhavānī is an aspect of Durga, and she is considered to be a mother who provides well for her devotees and plays the role of dispensing justice by killing Asuras. She is often seen as an independent goddess, separate from Brahma, Vishnu and Shiva. However, According to the Śiva Purāṇa, Bhavānī is the supreme goddess. Bhavānī (भवानी, "the giver of existence").—One of the names of the Goddess, Devī, who is regarded as the female principle of the divine; the embodiment of the energies of the Gods. Bhavānī (भवानी) is an epithet of the Goddess (Devī), who incarnated as Satī, according to the Śivapurāṇa 2.2.14. Accordingly, as Brahmā narrated to Nārada:—"[...] On seeing the mother of the universe born of Vīriṇī, Dakṣa joined his palms in reverence, paid respects to her, and eulogised her. [...] O mother of the universe, those who eulogise Thee with the names of Bhavānī, Ambikā, Jaganmāyā and Durgā will have everything". The Goddess has a great variety of names referable to her various forms, attributes, and actions, but these names are not always used accurately and distinctively. As the mother of the world, she is Gauri, Maa Sherawali, Ambikā or Jagaṭ Jananī (the reading Jagaṭ Jananī/Jaga Jananī for Jaganmāyā is preferable). In her fiercer form, she is Durgā, the killer of Mahishasur..

== Temples of Bhavani ==
- The Tulja Bhavani temple in Tuljapur in the Dharashiv district of Maharashtra is considered one of the 51 Shakta pithas (pilgrimage sites). This temple was built close to the 12th century CE. Another Tulja Bhavani temple was constructed between 1537 and 1540 CE in Chittorgarh, located at coordinates 18.011386°N 76.125641°E.
- Dewas Tekri

== History ==
Worship of the primeval energy, Shakti, in the form of the Mother Goddess, is seen in the four Shakta pithas of Maharashtra: Bhavānī, with her seat at Tuljapur, Mahalakshmi at Kolhapur, Mahamaya Renuka at Mahur, and Saptashrungi at Vani. Śrī Bhavānī Amman is also worshipped in the state of Tamil Nadu (Periyapalayam). Other Shakti temples in the Maharashtra state are those at Ambejogai, Aundh, Maharashtra, and Karnataka.

The goddess Bhavānī is held in great reverence throughout Maharashtra. She is considered to be an embodiment of ugra or ferocity, as well as a Karunaswaroopini, an embodiment of mercy. A number of castes, sub-castes, and families from Maharashtra consider her their family deity or Kuladevata. The Bhavani temple in Tuljapur is located on a hill known as Yamunachala, on the slopes of the Sahayadri range in Maharashtra near Solapur. The temple entrance is elevated and visitors ascend a flight of steps to reach the shrine.

Historic records speak of the existence of this temple from as early as the 12th century CE. Bhavānī is worshipped in the form of a granite image, 3 feet (0.91 m) tall, with eight arms that hold weapons and one hand in abhayā mūdra (giving blessings to devotees), she kills the demon Mahishasura in 4 different forms which are Katyayani (10-armed), Mahalakshmi (18-armed/1000 armed Devī Ćaṇḍika from Durgā Saptaśatī), Ugrachanda (18-armed) and Bhadrakali (16-armed). Legend says that a demon by the name of Matang wreaked havoc upon the devas and humans, who approached Brahma for help.

Upon his advice, they turned to the Mother Goddess Shakti. She took the form of the destroyer and, empowered by the other Saptamātṛka (Brāhmaṇī, Vaiṣṇavī, Māheśvari, Indrāṇi, Kaumārī, Vārāhī, and Ćāmuṇḍā.), vanquished the demon and allowed the restoration of peace. Legend also describes how Bhavānī vanquished another demon who had taken the form of a wild buffalo, Mahishasura (hence her name Mahishasura Mardhini or "the slayer of Mahisha the demon"). Later, she is said to have taken abode on the Yamunachala hill, which is now home to the temple. Bhavānī is said to have come here to save Anubhuti from the demon known as Kukur. In a battle with the goddess, Kukur took the form of a buffalo; Bhavani cut off his head, and he then started changing into his original form. At that time, she stabbed her trident into his chest. Hence, she is in form of Mahishasura Mardini Durga. Four worship services are offered at the temple each day.

The festivals of special significance are Gudi Padwa in the month of Chaitra, Shriral Sashti, Lalita Panchami, Makara Sankranti, and Rathasaptami. The statue of the deity is taken out in procession on Tuesdays. Navaratri is also celebrated with great fanfare, and it culminates in Vijaya Dasami. Sri Bhavani Devi is said to be Adi Parashakti herself, and the name Bhavani has several meanings. According to Lalitha Sahasranamam, Bhavānī means the deity who always helps devotees gain mukti. Adi Shankara said, "A Person who recites the name Bhavani with true devotion thrice every day will not acquire sorrow, sin, illness and unexpected death." People occasionally confuse Bhavani devi with Renuka Devi; however, their stories are different. There are many texts which name Bhavani as the wife of Sadasiva.

Bhavai is also worshipped as clan deity by many Hindus, notably by many Rajput, Marathas, the Deshastha Brahmins of Maharashtra and the Agris of Konkan. According to local tradition, Shivaji, the founder of the Maratha Empire, was presented with the Chandrahasa sword by Bhavani for the battle against evil.

=== Image of Tulja Bhavani ===
The image (murti) of Tulja Bhavani is made of black stone, about 3 feet (0.91 m) in height and 2 feet (0.61 m) in width. The face of the goddess is described as beautiful and smiling. The goddess is asta-bhuja (with 8 hands) Durga. Her long hair is coming out of the crown. She has a quiver on her back. The sun and the moon are present. Her lion stands near her. The image is self-manifested and movable.

It is moved three times a year from its place to the bedroom of Mā Bhavānī. Below the lion, sage Markandeya is chanting the Durga-saptashati shlokas. The lady sage Anubhuti is on the left side of the goddess; she is in a hanging position and is meditating on the goddess. It is chala murti, moved thrice a year during the long sleeping periods of maa Bhavani. The face of Sati had fallen in Tuljapur, and due to this the face is decorated with saris and ornaments.

== See also ==
- List of Hindu deities
- Shakta pithas
- Bhavani Ashtaka
- Three and a half Shakta pithas
- Tulja Bhavani Temple

== Notes ==
=== Works cited ===
- Eaton, Richard Maxwell (2015), The Sufis of Bijapur, 1300–1700: Social Roles of Sufis in Medieval India, Princeton University Press, ISBN 978-1-4008-6815-5
