= Tulja Bhavani Temple =

Hindu temple in Maharashtra, India

Shree Tulja Bhavani Temple
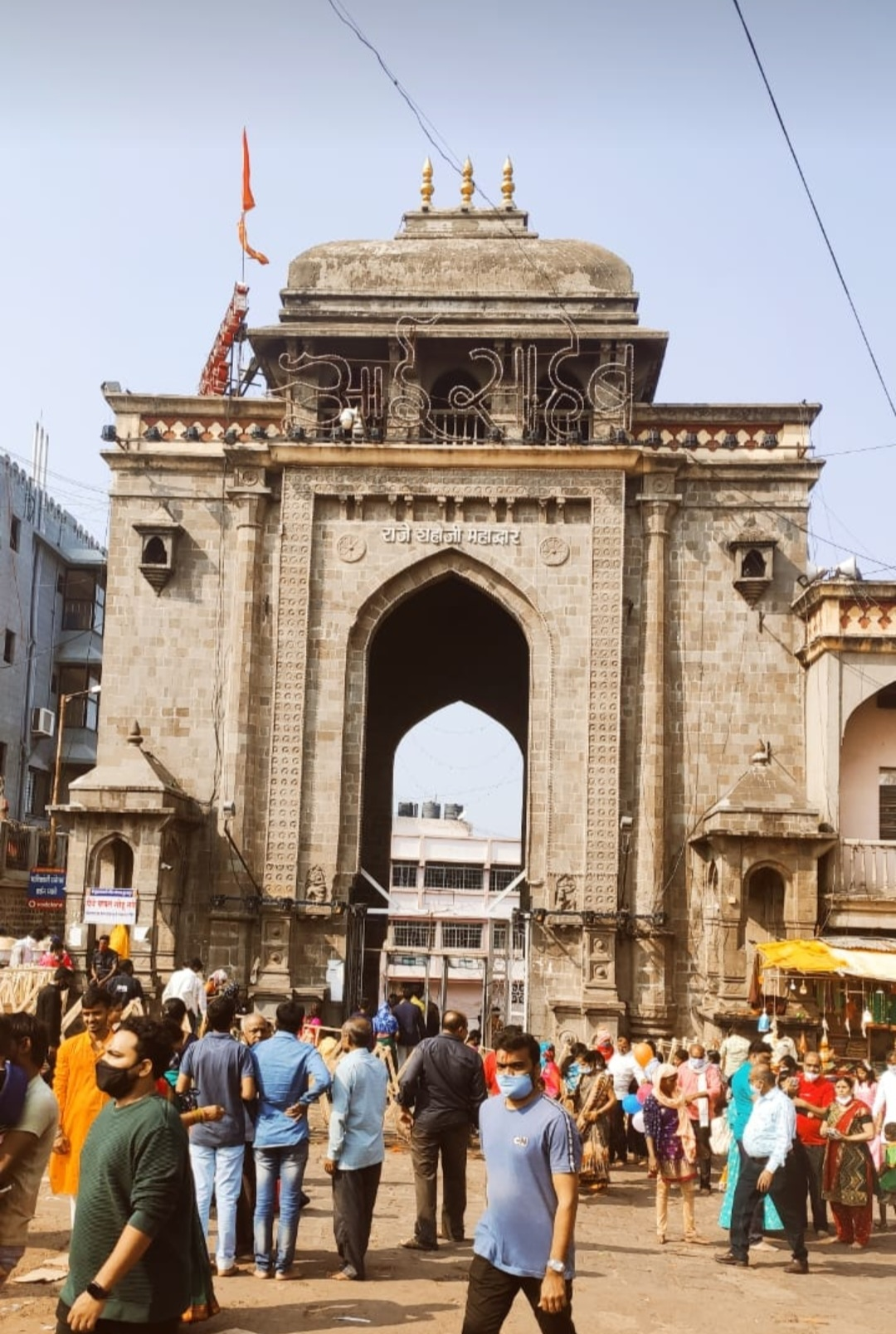
- Main entrance gate (Raje Shahaji Mahadwar)

- Location in Maharashtra Tulja Bhavani Temple (Maharashtra)

Religion
- Affiliation: Hinduism
- District: Dharashiv district
- Deity: Bhavani (as Amba Bhavani or Amba Bai)
- Festivals: Navaratri; Dussehra; Ganesh Chaturthi; Holi; Deepawali (Diwali)
- Governing body: Shri Tulja Bhavani Temple Trust
- Features: Temple tree: 3 big trees

Location
- Location: Raje Shahaji Mahadwar Road, Jijamata Nagar, Tuljapur, Dharashiv district, Maharashtra - 413601
- State: Maharashtra
- Country: India
- Coordinates: 18.011386°N 76.125641°E

Architecture
- Type: Hemadpanti architecture
- Style: Hemadpanthi style
- Creator: Mahamandaleshwara Māradadeva
- Established: 1169; 857 years ago
- Completed: 1169; 857 years ago

Specifications
- Inscriptions: Dharur Inscription
- Materials: Black stone
- Elevation: 648 m (2,126 ft)

Website
- shrituljabhavanitempletrust.org

Shree Tulaja Bhavani Temple is a 12th-century-CE Hindu temple dedicated to goddess Bhavani, located in Dharashiv district of Maharashtra, India. It was built in 12th century CE by Mahamandaleshwara Māradadeva of the Kadamb dynasty. Considered as one of the 51 Shakti Pithas, it is located on the banks of Mandakini River and Bori Dam in Yamunachala Hill of Balaghat Range of Tuljapur, which is 45 km northeast of Solapur, in Dharashiv district of Maharashtra in India.

This Tuljapur Bhavani temple, along with Renuka temple at Mahur (330 km northeast of Tuljapur), Mahalaxmi temple at Kolhapur (275 southwest of Tuljapur), and Saptashringi temple at Vani (375 northwest of Tuljapur), make up the four great Shaktipithas of Maharashtra.

There are other temples of Tulja Bhavani in India, such as the Chittorgarh Fort Tulja Bhavani Temple at Chittorgarh built in 1537–1540. This is 960 km north of Tuljapur. As well as this, there is the Patnakuva Tulja Bhavani Temple in the Gandhinagar district of Gujarat, which is 1,000 km northwest of Tuljapur.

== Bhavani ==
Bhavani is a form of Durga who is worshipped in Maharashtra, Gujarat, Rajasthan, Rajasthan, all.of North India, Northern Karnataka, and Nepal, Andhra Pradesh, Telangana.

=== Skanda Purana legend of Bhavani ===
One of the earliest legends related to Bhavani is mentioned in the Skanda Purana (8th century or earlier). The legend involves a demon, Madhu-Kaitabh, who was wreaking havoc upon both the gods and humans. Unable to find any solution, they turned to Lord Brahma for help, who advised them to turn to the Shakti. She took up the form of a destroyer, and powered by the other Sapta Matas, namely Brahmani who manifested from Brahma, Chamunda from Chandi, Kaumari from Kartikeya, Indrani from Indra, Maheshvari from Shiva, Vaishnavi from Vishnu, and Varahi from Varaha, vanquished the demon and restored peace. The legend also states that Bhavani slayed another demon that had taken up the disguise of a buffalo (Mahisha), and took shelter on the Yamunachala Hill which is part of Balaghat mountain range.

=== Bhavani as Kuldevi ===
She is a kuldevi (clan goddess) for many Maratha clans of Maharashtra. She is either revered by or is the Family Deity for many other Marathi castes at different levels of the social hierarchy

== Temple complex ==
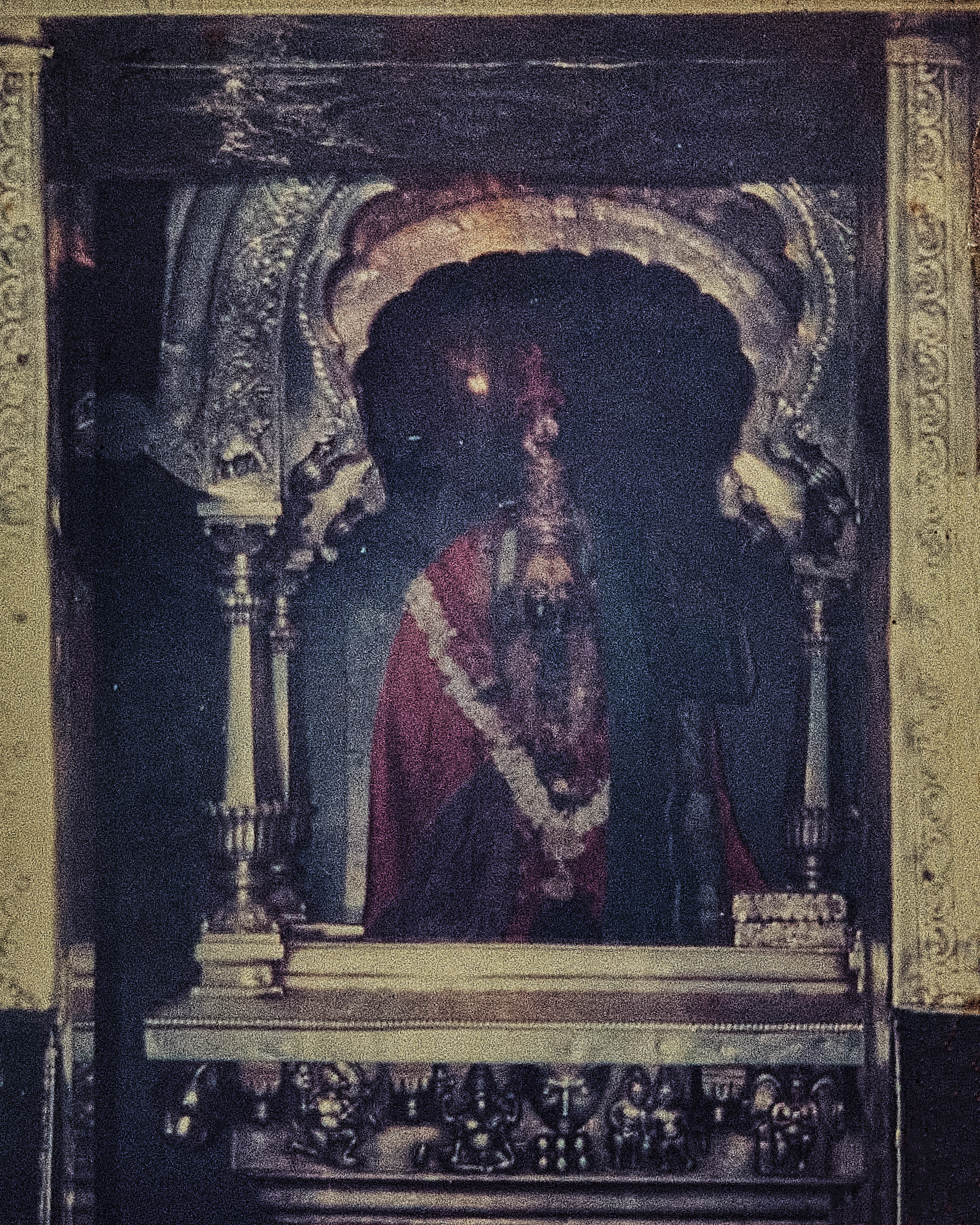
Mūrti of Tulja Bhawani in the sanctum.

=== 12th century Bhavani Bhavani main temple ===
==== Temple history ====
Tulja Bhavani Temple here was built in the 12th century CE. The Goddess is said to be swayambhu` ("self-manifested" or "that which is created by its own accord"). (Note: It is true that God or Goddess is always referred as ‘swayambhu’ in Vedas, Puranas and many legends. But it does not refer to the stone idol installed in a temple. What is attributed is to the invisible Supreme power.) There is a "yagna kund" (holy fire pit) in front of this temple.

==== Idol of Goddess Bhavani in the temple ====
The tandla (murti) of Goddess Tulja Bhawani is three-feet tall and made of granite, with eight arms holding weapons, and bearing the head of the slain demon Mahishasura. Devotees bow in devotion upon seeing the finely shaped, tandla of the self-manifested goddess, which is adorned with vermilion, ornaments, and decorations.

==== 3 Entrances ====
===== Sardar Nimbalkar entrance and related temples =====
The main entrance of the temple bears the name of Sardar Nimbalkar.

- Markandeya Rishi Temple: Inside the entrance, there is a temple dedicated to the sage Markandeya Rishi on the right.
- Tulja Bhavani Temple: After descending the stairs from the Sardar Nimbalkar entrance, one sees the main Tulja Temple.
- Gomukh Theerth and Kallol Theerth (Kalakh): After alighting from the stairs, there is "Gomukh Theerth" on the right side and "Kalakh", also known as "Kallol Theerth" on the left side. Before entering the sanctum sanctorum of the Goddess, devotees take a dip here in these theerths (shallow tanks of holy water).
- Adi Maya Adi Shakti temple: This temple Adi Maya (Mahadevi) is located on the right side of the main entrance and to the north of the main Tulja Bhavani temple. The pooja ([prayer) is performed here first, before the pooja of Tulja Bhavani. The priests of this temple belong to the Mahar community.
- Siddhi Vinayak temple: Situated on the left side of the main entrance of the complex.

===== Shahaji entrance and Jijabai entrance =====
The other two entrances are named after the parents of Chhatrapati Shivaji, the founder of the Maratha Empire, his father Shahaji and his mother Jijabai. There are two libraries named, Shree Santh Dnyaneshwar Dharmik Library and Shree Tukaram Dharmik Library respectively.

Chhatrapati Maharaja Shivaji was reputed to frequently visit this temple to seek blessings.

=== Temple management ===
The day-to-day affairs of the temple are looked after by the trust which is headed by the District Collector. The board of trustees include the deputy collector, the member representing Tuljapur in Maharashtra Legislative Assembly (MLA), the town Mayor (Nagaradhyaksha), and the Tahsildar (subdistrict revenue officer).

=== Pilgrim numbers ===
As of 2025, 150,000,000 pilgrims visit the temple every year.

== Rituals ==
=== Daily rituals ===
The temple follows a set of elaborate rituals for the deity. These include priests offering a daily ritual bath, change of clothes, and offering food to the deity four times a day. The daily routine also includes offering devotional prayers to the Goddess. In the evening the deity is ceremoniously put to rest.

=== Special occasions rituals ===
On special occasions such as the birthdays or marriages, in addition to a ritual bath, the tandla of the Goddess is taken around Tuljapur town in a procession.

==== Other devotional practices ====
Besides performing religious rituals, devotees perform Durga Saptashati Path in Tuljapur. This ritual involves chanting mantras and verses dedicated to Goddess Durga. According to the Devi Mahatmya (part of the Markandeya Purana), Devi defeats evil forces.

=== Navratri Animal sacrifice ritual ===
On the ninth day of the autumn Navratri festival and Dussera, goats are sacrificed in honour of the goddess. The actual sacrificial slaughter is carried out by the Mahar community for both the Bhavani temple as well as the Matangi temple.

=== Maratha priests ===
Pilgrims usually have longstanding hereditary relationship with a particular "pujari (priest) family"" who serve as the host for the pilgrims by providing accommodation, food, ritual offering to the deity such as sari blouse pieces, bangles, coconut, vermillion, turmeric, puffed rice, flower garlands, and prasada (ritual offering of food to the deity before being distributed to the devotees).The prasada can be vegetarian or at times of meat from a sacrificed goat.

Unlike brahmin or gurav priests at other temples in Maharashtra, the main priests of the Bhavani temple are from the Maratha 153 Palikar & Bhope clan, who offer services to the pilgrims.

The priests of two other temples, Matangi Devi Temple and Adimaya Devi Temple in the Tulha Bhavani temple complex, belong to the Mahar community.

== Development plans ==
Tulja Bhavani Temple Corridor: In 2025, INR 1,865 crore plan was announced by the Government of Maharashtra for the overall development of the Tulja Bhavani Temple Corridor, which will be completed over three and half years, i.e. December 2028.

== See also ==
- Dewas Tekri (also has a famous Tulja Bhawani - Badi Mata Mandir, in Dewas Junior State.)
- Dharashiv Caves, 5th century temple caves 8 km west of Dharashiv and 30 km north of Tulja Bhavani Temple.
