= History of Beed =

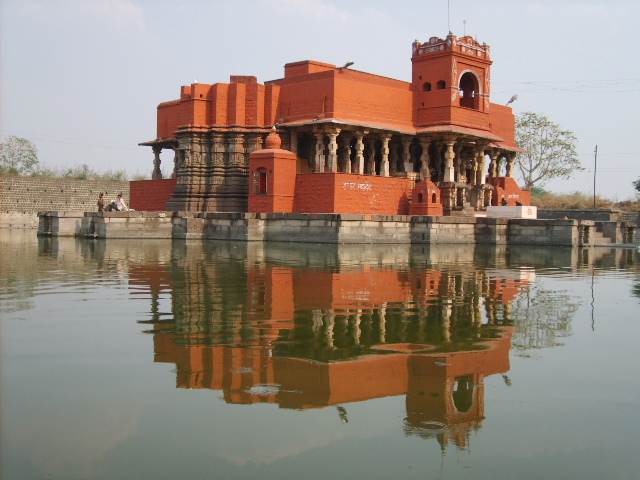
Kankaleshwar temple

Beed is a historical town of possibly medieval origin, in Maharashtra, India.

== Historical accounts ==
The first historical mention of the town came in the Tārīkh-e-Firishta (original name Gulshan-e-Ibrahimi) compiled by Muhammad Qasim Firishta (1560–1620), a 17th-century Persian-Indian historian. Famous English translation of this book History of The Rise of Mahomedan Power in India by John Briggs has been published several times in India and abroad. Firishta has given little but valuable information about the town of his time. He has also mentioned the famous Kankaleshwar temple in detail. In 1317 AH (1898), Qazi Muhammad Qutbullah, a resident and Qazi of Beed wrote a detailed history of Beed town (Tārīkh-e-Bīr) in Urdu based on the accounts available at that time. Copy of this book, now can only be found in the State Archives, Library of Salar Jang Museum and Library of Osmania University; all in Hyderabad. However, first detailed history of the town Riyāz-ul-Abrār (Garden of the Virtuous) was written by Qazi Muhammad Fakhruddin in 1152 AH (1739). Unfortunately this book is not available in the libraries for reference. However, Qutbullah has quoted this book in his Tārīkh-e-Bīr (History of Beed) and also has referred for the accounts. In 1361 AH (1942) Syed Basit Ali, a resident of Beed, who was a student of intermediate in the City College of Hyderabad, wrote a brief history Tārīkh-e-Bīr in Urdu. Its copies can be found in the library of Osmania University. In recent times Abdul Hamīd Nathapuri wrote Zila Bīr Kī Tārīkh (history of Beed district) in Urdu which is published in 1998 from Mumbai. His book gives accounts of mainly Beed town and is largely based on Qutbullah's accounts and oral traditions. Some historical accounts can also be found in the gazette of Beed district published in 1969 by the Gazetteers Department of Beed district. This Gazette is now out of print but available online at the government of Maharashtra website. The Imperial Gazetteer of India, compiled during the British rule also gives some important details of the town and the district.

== Foundation and name ==
The history of the foundation of the town is unknown. According to legend, Beed was an inhabited place in the period of Pandavas and Kurus as Durgavati. Its name was subsequently changed to Balni. Champavati, who was sister of Vikramaditya, after capturing it renamed as Champavatinagar. After that the town fell to Chalukya, Rashtrkuta and Yadava dynasties before felling to the Muslim rule. However, some scholars say that it was possibly founded by the Yadava rulers of Devagiri (now Daulatabad). Tārīkh-e-Bīr (history of Beed) mentions that Muhammad bin Tughluq named it Bir (Arabic ‘Well’) after building a fort and several wells in and around the town. Until recent times, wells were abundant in the town. Because of modern facilities of water supply they became less important and subsequently most of them were filled. It is unclear that as to how the present name Beed came into use. There are at least two different traditions. The first tradition says that since the district is situated at the foot of Balaghat Range as if it is in a hole, it was named as Bil (Marathi for hole) which in course of time corrupted to Bid. According to the second tradition a Yavana ruler of ancient India, named it Bhir (Persian for Water) after finding water at a very low depth and Bhir might have become Beed in course of time. The first tradition seems to be untrue, because with no angle, the entire district can be called a ‘hole’. Only north eastern part of the district is at lower heights and a vast area of 10,615 km^{2} can not be called a ‘hole’ just because of slight depression. Furthermore, Bil (hole) in Marathi is spoken for a deep and narrow hole not for a slight depression. The second tradition though, have some distortion, appears to be true and in accord with Tārīkh-e-Bīr of Quazi Muhammad Qutbullah (1898). The word ‘Yavana’ in early Indian literature meant a Greek or any foreigner. At a much later date it was frequently applied to the Muslim invaders of India. It is quite possible that Muhammad bin Tughluq may have been referred in this tradition as Yavana ruler. Muslims invaded and ruled the Deccan for centuries and almost all Muslim rulers had Persian as their court language. It seems that Arabic 'Bir' was eventually pronounced ‘Bhir’ in the Indian languages and the people mistakenly took this Arabic word as Persian for the court language of the rulers was Persian. Until recent times after independence, the town was called ‘Bir’ and ‘Bhir’ in the official documents.

== Historical events ==
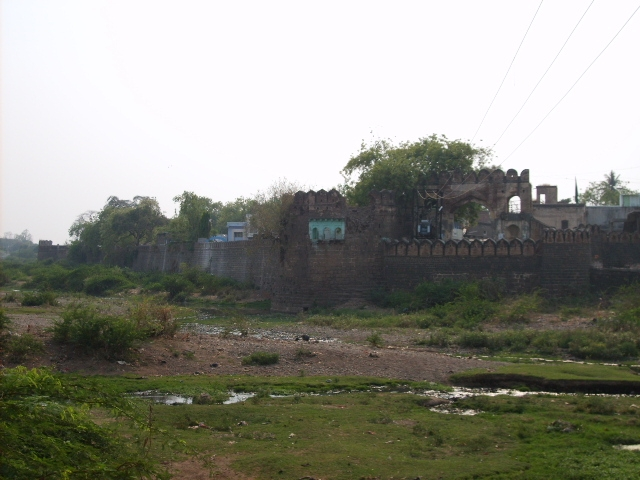
Degenerating wall of ancient citadel and its Burjs — An unfortunate shield for the violent floods of Bendsura for the fortunate dwellers of the town.

According to legend, when Ravana, demon king of Lanka (Sri Lanka), abducted Sita (wife of Hindu deity Rama) and was taking her to Lanka, Jatayu (eagle) tried to stop him. Ravana cut its wings and wounded Jatayu fell on the ground. When Rama reached there in search of his beloved wife, Jatayu told him the whole story and died. The place where he died is said to be in Beed town and Jatashankar temple is standing at the place, which is; according to scholars, possibly built by Yadavas of Devagiri. Another legend also narrates that Beed was called Durgavati in the period of Pandavas and Kurus who fought a devastating war of Mahabharata.

== Early history ==
Early history of the town is obscure until it came under Tughluq rule. If the town was founded in Yadava era then possibly it happened in king Singhana's (1210–47) period, when Yadava dynasty reached its height. He may have built the town and Kankaleshwar temple as well. Beed came under Muslim rule for the first time in 1317 when Qutb-ud-Din Mubarak Shah (1316–20), the last Khalji, captured Devagiri and Yadava dynasty was annexed to Khalji dynasty. Beed remained under Khaljis until 1320 when Ghiyas-ud-Din Tughluq (1320–25) took over. In 1327 Muhammad bin Tughluq (1325–51) made Daulatabad his capital. Tughluq and his army camped in the town in 1341 (AH 742 Islamic calendar) while on the journey back to Daulatabad from Warangal. The emperor lost one of his teeth here, which he ordered to be buried with much ceremony and a tomb was constructed at the place. The tomb is still present in very poor condition near the village Karjani about 13 km south of the town. Juna Khan one of the governors of Tughluq empire is said to have resided in Beed for quite some time and introduced many reforms for the welfare of the ruled. He diverted the course of Bendsura from west to east by constructing a protection wall around the town. Before his time there was no such protection for the town and it was situated on the eastern bank of the river. After that the population was largely shifted to the western part. In 1347 Beed came under Bahmanid rule when Hasan Gangu (1347–58), founder of Bahmanid Sultanate, rebelled against Tughluq rule and ascended throne of Daulatabad as Ala-ud-Din Bahman Shah. Muhammad Tughluq acted vigorously and came to Deccan to subdue the rebels. He recaptured the province of Daulatabad, of which, Beed was a part. Hasan Gangu and other insurgents fled to Bidar and Gulbarga. Before the matter is fully settled a rebel broke in Gujarat and the sultan approached to Gujarat appointing Imad-ul-Mulk as governor in Deccan. Meanwhile, Hasan Gangu attacked Daulatabad and marched towards Beed and captured it. After that the town remained under Bahmanid rule and is said to be flourished under Firuz Shah Bahmani's (1397–1422) rule. During the reign of Humayun Shah Bahmani (1451–61), famous as Zālim (cruel), his brother Hasan Shah rebelled and came to Beed. A Jagirdar (feudatory) of Beed, Habibullah Shah was his supporter. Humayun Shah sent an army and after a fierce fighting in the grounds of Kankaleshwar temple, the rebellion armies defeated Humayun's army. Humayun became furious and sent another force to defeat the rebels. This time rebels were defeated, Habibullah Shah was killed and captured Hasan Shah was taken to the capital and was put before a hungry lion.

== 1600 CE to 1858 CE ==
After the decline of Bahmanid Sultanate town fell to Nizam Shahi rulers of Ahmadnagar. Several wars were fought in Beed between Nizam Shahi and Adil Shahi rulers of Bijapur to take the control of Beed. In 1598 Mughals captured Beed from Chand Bibi of Ahmadnagar. A year later Nihang Khan retook it but soon it fell again to Mughals. Mughal army camped here for some time. During the reign of Jahangir (1569–1627), Jan Sipar Khan was administering Beed town. He constructed Jama Masjid of Beed in 1036 AH (1627). Aurangzeb (1658–1707), appointed Haji Sadar Shah in Beed as Naib-e-Subadar (assistant of governor). Sadar Shah did some good changes and constructions in the town. He built Eid Gah (place of Eid prayer) in 1702 and a new habitation on the heights in the eastern part as Ghazi Pura (now Islam Pura) in 1703. The remains of it are still visible. He also constructed a small citadel (1703) inside the old large citadel which was worn out after standing for several hundred years, from Tughluq period. A stone plate in Persian script at the main entry of Jama Masjid sets the year of construction of citadel by Haji Sadar Shah in the year 1115 AH (1703). In his period economy of the town also flourished. Chhagal (water container made of leather), Gupti (hidden sword in wooden stick) etc. made in Beed were popular in the region.

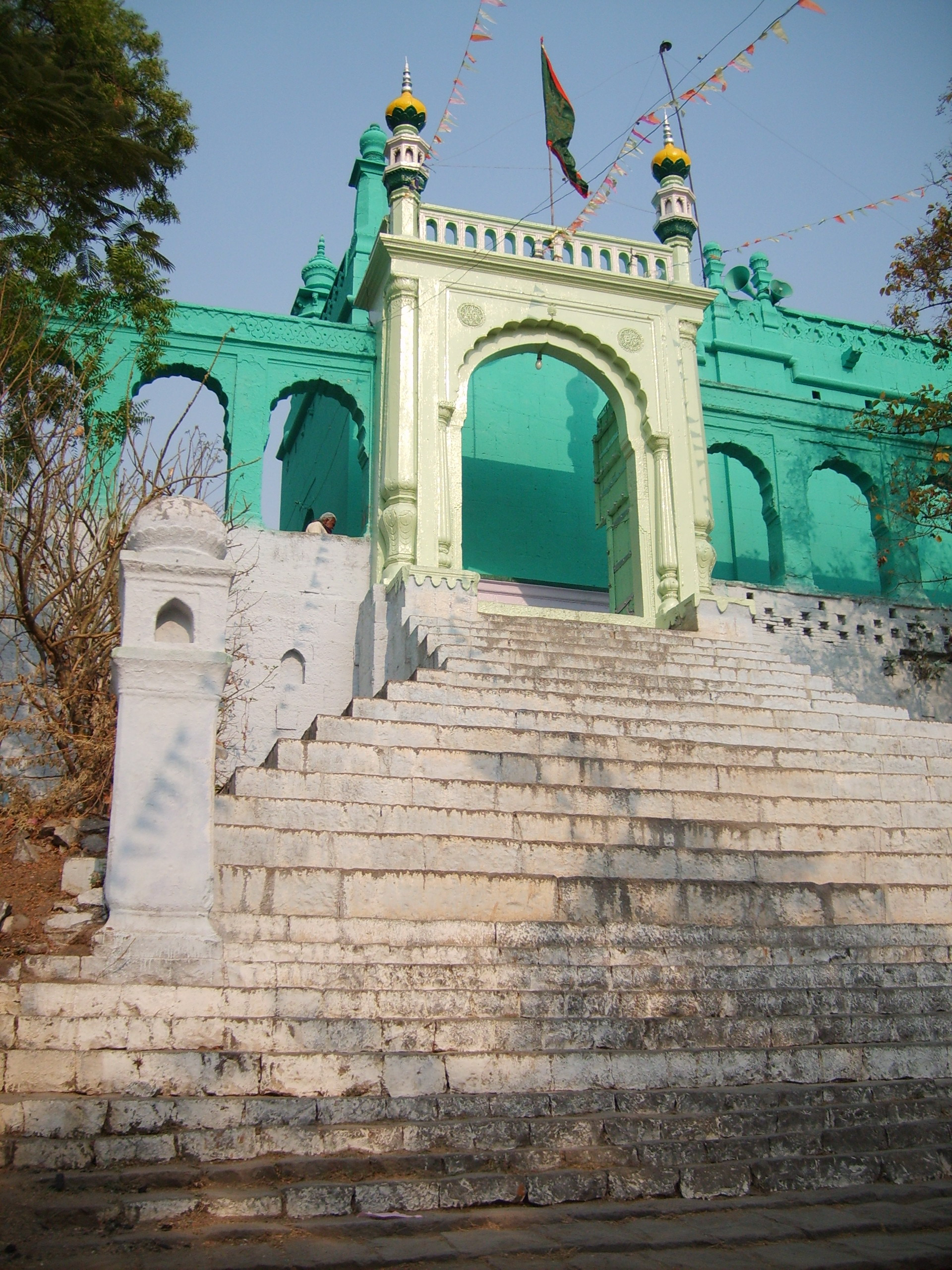
This main entrance of Shahinshah Wali tomb was constructed by Amīr Nawāz Jang in 1830.

Beed was a town during Bahmanids and Mughals. Tārīkh-e-Bīr mentions many gardens and amenities of these periods. Until the 1960s there were two well maintained gardens in the town. In 1724 Nizam-ul-Mulk Asaf Jah founded Asaf Jahi kingdom, seizing Deccan against the rule of Mughal emperor Muhammad Shah (1719–48). In Nizams' era no major addition or construction was done to the citadel because the old building was serving the purpose and the citadels were losing importance with the advent of modern fighting techniques. Maratha ruler of Gwalior, Mahadji Scindia (1761–94) was defeated and severely injured and was missing in the third war of Panipat in 1761. His wife, who is said to be from Beed, went to a Muslim Sufi of Beed Mansur Shah and told him to prey for the return of Mahadji. After return to Gwalior Mahadji called Mansur Shah to Gwalior but he refused and sent his son Habib Shah instead. Mahadji remained thankful to Mansur Shah for all his life. His tomb is in eastern Beed. Reign of sixth Nizam Mir Mahbub Ali Khan (1869–1911) proved eventful in the history of Beed. Rebels, great famine and floods happened in his reign. Jagirdars were replaced by Awwal Taluqdars (Collectors) in his father's reign and Jivanji Ratanji came as the first collector of Beed in 1865. Districts were created and Beed district was formally settled in 1883. He constructed one habitation and market Mahbub Gunj (now Hiralal Chowk) on the eastern bank of Bendsura, remains of that can still be seen. After a very scarce rainfall in three successive years 1897–99, great famine occurred in Beed in 1900. Thousands of cattle and Hundreds of humans died of starvation and thousands migrated to the neighbouring parts of the country. The census in 1901 reported remarkable decrease of 150,464 in the population of Beed district. Mir Osman Ali Khan (1911–48) came after his father's death. Kotwalis, Police Stations, Schools, Hospitals and Dispensaries were built during his period. Nizams were allies of the British Empire in India. During the countrywide movement for independence, in 19th and 20th centuries they tried to suppress the feelings of nationalism which were spreading due to nationwide efforts of the freedom fighters. Nationalists in the state of Hyderabad did not like Nizam's friendship with the oppressor British Empire. Beed was the first place in Marathwada region where freedom struggle started in 1818. In 1818 during the rule of Nizam Sikandar Jah (1803–29) first rebellion of Maharashtra broke out in Beed under the leadership of Dharmaji 'Pratap Rao' Garje (a Maratha - Vanjari ruler) with the Peshwa Baji Rao II. Nizam sent the Risala of Navab Murtaza Yar Jang under the command of British Lieutenant John Sutherland. The rebel leader and his brother were captured and a long run rebellion movement in Beed came to an end.

== 1858 CE to Present ==
Another rebel broke in 1858 and all the rebels were captured. After that many small incidents of defiance happened against British rule but all were suppressed by force. A major rebel broke under the leadership of Baba Sahab alias Rao Sahab in 1898. The important leaders of this movement were Brahmins of Beed and the Brahmin officials in police and judiciary also supported the movement. They were dreaming of Brahmin rule and started collecting money for arms by looting and donations in different parts of the district. But after a short fight the rebels were captured and the movement came to an end. But the feelings of defiance could not be suppressed and different movements under the leadership of Swami Ramanand Teerth and Govind Bhai Shroff continued in Marathwada and the state. After independence, Mir Osman Ali Khan was reluctant to join the Indian Union. Finally, on 12 September 1948 a military action Operation Polo was launched and the state was easily captured within six days as Nizam's army resisted little. Although Operation Polo caused relatively few casualties, the following communal carnage was all the more terrible. Beed was one of the eight worst hit districts in the state. After calm down, a team visited the town on behalf of Indian government and sent a report to the centre. According to official, Sundarlal Report, 27,000-40,000 Muslims were killed throughout the state. Horrible crimes of abduction and rape of women and girls, loot, arson, desecration of mosques, forcible conversions and seizure of houses and lands were mentioned in the report. Some unofficial reports, however, puts the figure of killings up to 50,000 and some even to a few hundred thousand. A plebiscite was held shortly after the military action in which the population voted overwhelmingly in favour of joining the Indian Union. Many Muslims during and after 1948 migrated to Pakistan. The town has witnessed communal strife several times in modern India. In 1949 Bendsura Project was launched to provide drinking and irrigation water supply to the town and nearby villages. The project was completed in 1956. In 1952 Beed Nagar Pālika (Municipal Council) was established under the undivided Hyderabad State. In 1962, a year after the creation of Maharashtra State, Beed Zila Parīshad (District Council) came into being after dissolving all the local bodies.

== Chronology ==
- 13th Century (possibly) - Beed town was founded.
- 13th/14th Century (possibly) - Kankaleshwar temple was built.
- 1317: Beed falls to the Khaljis as Qutb-ud-Din Mubarak Shah captures Devagiri.
- 1327: Beed came under Tughluqs.
- 1341: Emperor Muhammad Tughluq came to the town. On his order the citadel was built, the flow of Bendsura was turned to the south, several wells were dug in and around the town and the town was named Bir.
- 1347: Beed comes under Bahmanid rule as Ala-ud-Din Bahman Shah founds Bahmani Sultanate.
- c. 1455: a fierce war was fought between Humayun Shah Zālim and Hasan Shah in the grounds of Kankaleshwar temple. Ruler Humayun was defeated. Humayun sent another army and the rebel was captured.
- 1499: Beed was annexed to the Nizam Shahi dynasty of Ahmadnagar after the capture of Daulatabad.
- 1583: Khazana Well constructed.
- 1598: Mughal captures Beed from Chand Bibi of Ahmadnagar.
- 1627: Jama Masjid was constructed by Jan Sipar Khan.
- 1702: Eid Gah (place of Eid prayer) was built.
- 1703: New citadel inside the old fort and a new habitation on the eastern heights were built during the rule of Aurangzeb.
- 1724: Beed became part of Asaf Jahi kingdom (Hyderabad state) as Nizam-ul-Mulk Asaf Jah-I seize Deccan.
- 1739: Qazi Muhammad Fakhruddin writes a detailed history of Beed town by the name 'Riyāz-ul-Abrār' (Garden of the Virtuous) in Urdu.
- 1818: Rebel brakes under the leadership of Dharmaji Pratap Rao. British Lieutenant John Sutherland comes with army and captures the rebel.
- 1835: Massive flood hits the town. Kotwali Gate and adjacent wall was constructed as a protection from frequent violent floods.

Katba — A stone plate carved in Persian at the Kotwali gate states the date of flood and construction of protection wall as 1251 AH (1835).

- 1858: A small rebel breaks but all the rebels were captured.
- 1865: Jivanji Ratanji became the first collector of Beed as the feudatory system was abolished by Nizams.
- 1883: Beed district was formally settled.
- 1898: A rebel broke under the leadership of Baba Sahab alias Rao Sahab. The rebels were captured.
- 1898: Qazi Muhammad Qutbullah, a resident and Qazi of Beed wrote a detailed history of Beed town (Tārīkh-e-Bīr) in Urdu.
- 1898–1900 - Great famine occurs in Beed. Hundreds of humans and thousands of cattle died.
- 1942: Syed Basit Ali wrote a brief history of Beed town in Urdu.

== Historical buildings ==
=== Kankaleshwar Temple ===
The architectural style suggests that it might have been constructed during Yadava period., most probably during the reign of Singhana (1210–47), who also founded Devagiri (Daulatabad). The design of this temple has some close similarities to the temples at the famous caves of Ellora. Situated in the middle of a small lake in the eastern part of the town, the temple is built with black stone and is carved with excellent human and divine figures. A fair is held in the grounds of temple during Mahashivratri.

=== Jama Masjid (Mosque) ===
Built during the period of Mughal emperor Jahangir (1605–27) by his official in Beed Jān Sipār Khan in 1036 AH (1627), it is one of the largest mosques in Beed. Situated in the centre of the town at Quila (citadel) it has three huge domes and four minarets.

=== Shahinshah Wali tomb ===
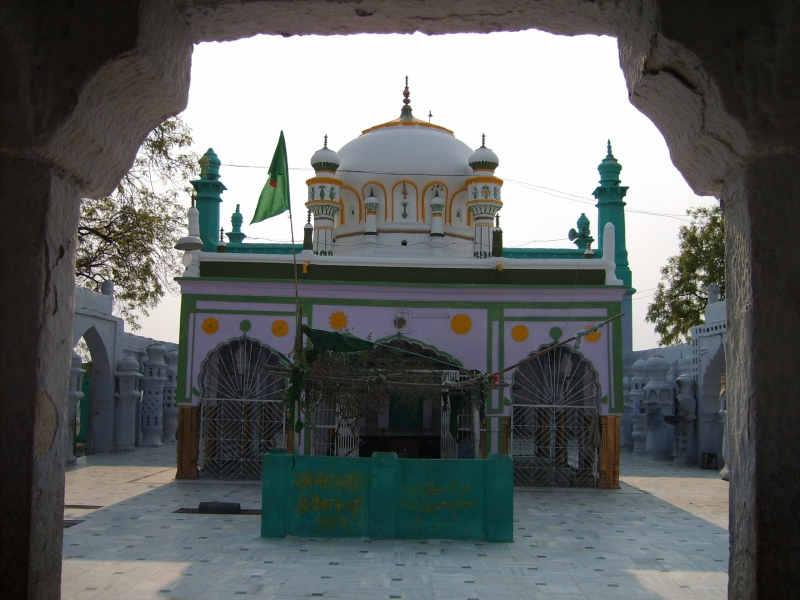
Shahinshah Wali tomb — dome on the grave of Sufi Shahinshah wali.

Shahinshah Wali was a Sufi of 14th century. He came to Beed during the rule of Muhammad Tughluq. His tomb and surrounding areas were built in different periods from 1385–1840. The details can be seen in the history of Beed. It is situated on the eastern elevations. Each year an Urs (fair) is held here on 2nd day of Rabi’ Al-Awwal, third month of Islamic calendar.

=== Khandoba Temple ===
It is situated on the eastern hills. Built in Hemadpanti style, it is often regarded as the symbol of town. Two symmetrical, octagonal dīpmal (tower of light) rising 21.33 meters (70 ft) are standing in front of the temple. Towers have carved figures of humans and animals, now most of them defaced. There are two stories about the construction of this temple. One says that it was built by Sultanji Nimbalkar a Jagirdar of Nizam era. The other says that it was built by Mahadji Scindia. Tārīkh-e-Bīr (History of Beed) mentions it with Nimbalkar.

=== Mansur Shah tomb ===
Mansur Shah was 18th century Sufi of Suharwardy clan of Sufis. He is said to be a Dharma Guru (spiritual teacher) of Mahadji Scindia. His tomb is in the eastern part of Beed near Khandeshwari temple. Dome of the shrine is made of marble.

=== Khazana Well ===
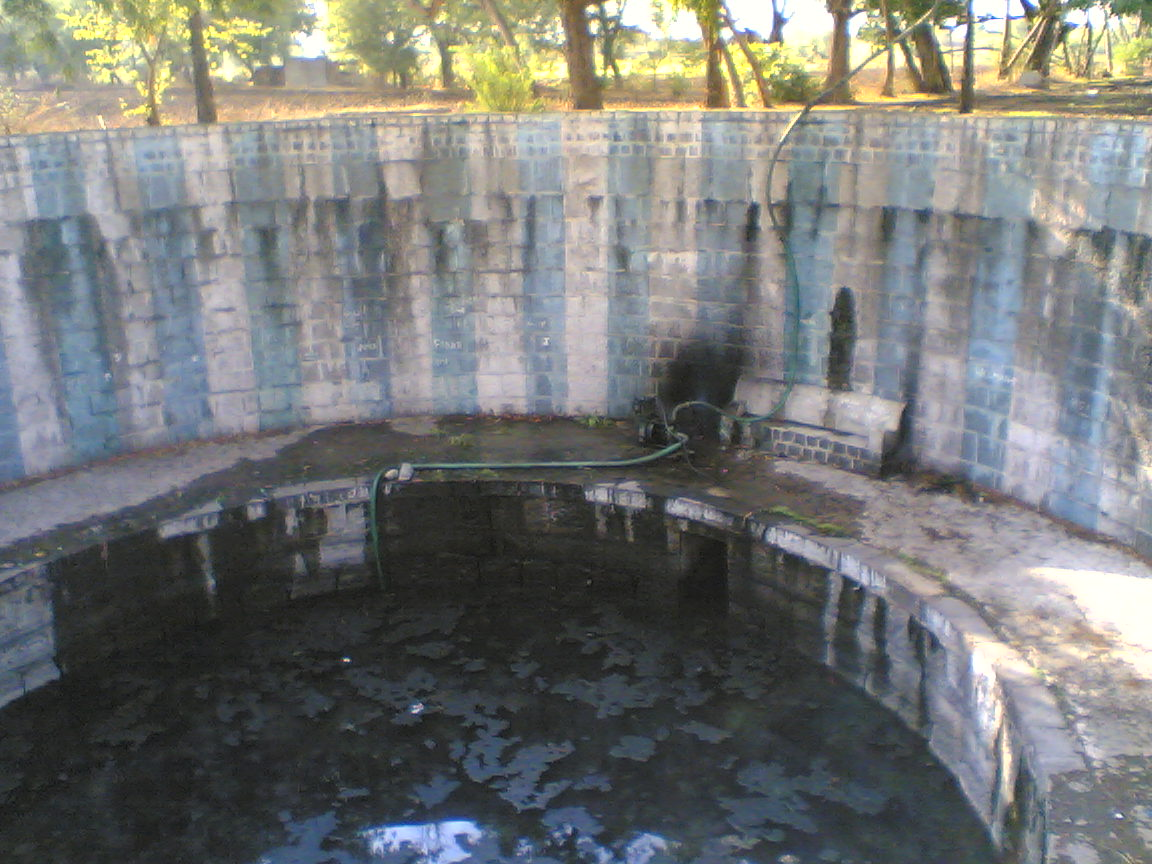
Khazana well — once famous and maintained, now is full of dirty water.

This historic and famous well is situated about 6 km south of the town. It was constructed in 991 AH (1583) by Salābat Khan, a Jagirdar of Beed in the period of Murtaza Nizam Shah of Ahmadnagar. It is said that the water level in this well remains unchanged even in droughts. Three currents of water start from the well and irrigate the land of Barg o Zār (meaning 'Leaves and Flowers', pronounced in colloquial as Balguzār) around the town. During droughts municipality of the town take water from this well and supply it to some parts of the town and surrounding villages. Salābat Khan also constructed Kāranja (fountains) and a garden in the centre of the town. Tower of Kāranja is still standing in the middle of the town in a very bad condition.

=== Historic Gates ===
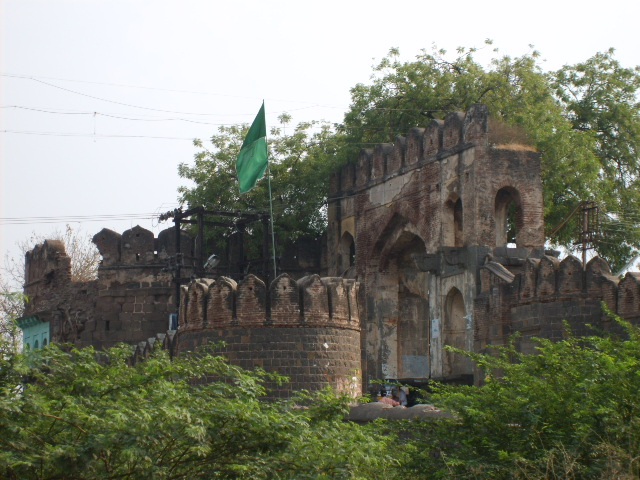
Bāb-uz-Zafar (Gate of success) — now known as Kotwali Ves (Kotwali gate) was built in 1835 on the western bank of Bendsura. The gate is now in poor condition and the adjacent Fatah Burj on left is almost gone.

The town had several gates and a small fort in the past. Now only four are remaining and are in poor condition. Only one out of several were built in the eastern part in Mahbub Gunj (now Hiralal Chowk). Kotwali gate (known as Kotwali Ves) is situated at the western bank of river Bendsura. This has got its name because a police station (Kotwali) was situated adjacent to the gate. Another gate, which is also in a bad condition, is found at Quila near Milliya campus. Fourth gate is in Bashīr Gunj area and perhaps is in a little better condition than the other gates, most probably due to the grave on its Burj which is said to be of some Sufi Buland Shah.
