= Bhavani Ashtaka =

Hindu hymn in praise of Bhavani

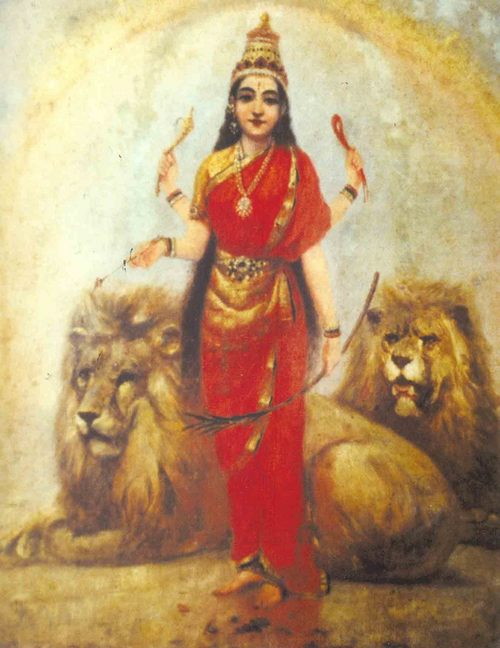
- Painting of Durga, Raja Ravi Varma

Information
- Religion: Hinduism
- Author: Adi Shankara
- Language: Sanskrit
- Verses: 8

The Bhavani Ashtaka (Sanskrit: भवानिअष्टकम्, romanized: Bhavāniaṣṭakaṃ), also called the Bhavanyashtaka, is an 8th-century Hindu ashtaka written by the philosopher Adi Shankara. Comprising 8 stanzas, the work extols the goddess Bhavani, an epithet of the goddess Durga.

== Description ==
In the hymn, Adi Shankara proclaims Bhavani, a form of the divine mother, to be his only refuge, help, and source of strength.

== Hymn ==
The first stanza of the mantra describes the author's veneration of Bhavani:

na tāto na mātā na bandhur na dātā
na putro na putrī na bhṛtyo na bhartā
na jāyā na vidyā na vṛttir mamaiva gatiḥ
tvaṁ gatiḥ tvaṁ tvamekā bhavāni

— Stanza 1

I have neither father nor mother, neither friend nor a grandson,
neither a son nor a daughter, neither a servant nor a husband
Neither have I a wife, nor any learning nor any occupation
You, Bhavani, you are alone my refuge

== See also ==
- Annapurna Stotra
- Mahishasura Mardini Stotra
- Lingashtaka
