= Shree Siddhi Vinayak Ganesh Temple, Nagda =

Hindu temple dedicated to Ganesha in Nagda, Dewas

Nagda Ganesh Mandir
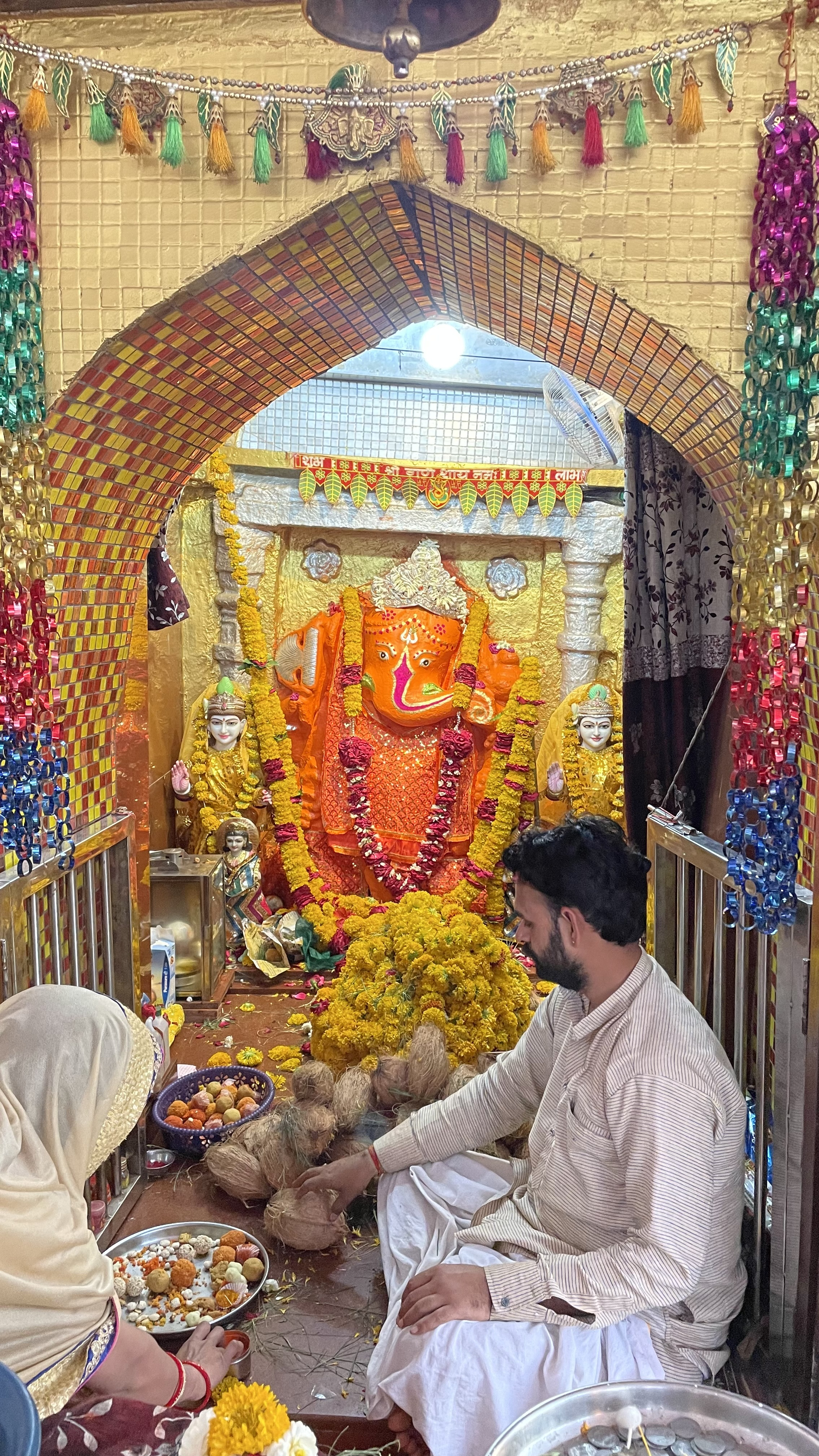
- Nagda Ganesh Mandir

- Location in Dewas, Madhya Pradesh Shree Siddhi Vinayak Ganesh Temple, Nagda (India)

Religion
- Affiliation: Hinduism
- Deity: Ganesha
- Festival: Ganesh Chaturthi

Location
- Location: Dewas
- State: Madhya Pradesh
- Country: India
- Interactive map of Nagda Ganesh Mandir
- Coordinates: 22°54′25.2″N 76°3′4.3″E

Shree Siddhi Vinayak Ganesh Mandir (also known as Nagda Ganesh Mandir) is a Hindu temple dedicated to Ganesha. It is located in Nagda, Dewas, Madhya Pradesh, India. It is situated at the end of Nagda village, about 7 km from the city.

The temple complex has a small mandap with the shrine of Siddhi Vinayak. Also, there is an ancient pond, and an ancient banyan tree in the lower part of which the figure of Lord Ganesha is embossed.

== History ==
It is believed that the temple dates back to the era of Pandavas and was built by king Janamejaya, son of Kuru king Parikshit. According to historians, the statue present in the temple is about 1100 years old.

== See also ==
- Dewas Tekri
