= Saptashrungi =

Pilgrimage site in India

Saptashrungi Devi Temple
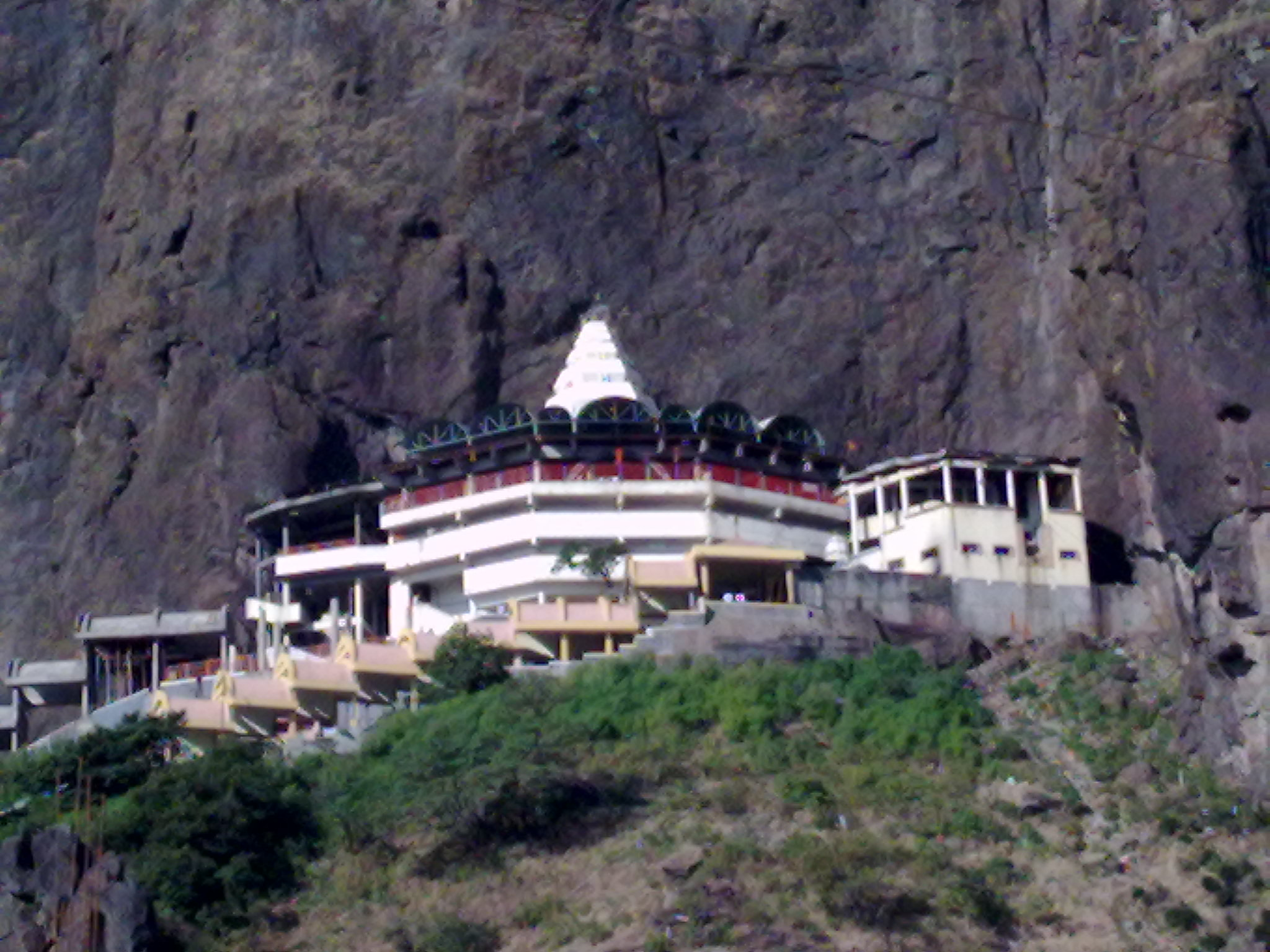

- Location in Maharashtra

Religion
- Affiliation: Hinduism
- District: Nashik
- Deity: Durga
- Festival: Navratri

Location
- Location: Vani/Nanduri village
- State: Maharashtra
- Country: India
- Coordinates: 20°23′25″N 73°54′31″E

Saptashrungi or Saptashringi (Marathi: सप्तशृङ्गि, Saptaśr̥ṇgī) is a site of Hindu pilgrimage in the village of Vani, situated 60 kilometres (37 mi) from Nashik in Indian state of Maharashtra. According to Hindu traditions, the goddess Saptashrungi Nivasini dwells within the seven mountain peaks. (Sapta means seven and shrung means peaks.) It is located in Nanduri, Kalwan taluka, a small village near Nashik in India. The Marathas and some Hindu tribes have worshipped the goddess from a long time and some worship her as their kuldaivat. There are 510 steps to climb the gad. To go from below to the temple, the temple trust has also provided the facility of a furnacular trolley. Its work started in July 2018. There are a total of 6 coaches in this trolley, and 10 passengers can sit in one coach. This trolley takes 3 minutes to reach the temple. Passengers have to climb 20 to 25 stairs to go from the station above the trolley to the temple. This trolley carries about 5000 passengers every day. Devotees visit this place in large numbers every day. The temple is also known popularly as one of the "three and half Shakta pithas" of Maharashtra . The temple is also one among the 51 Shakta pithas located on the Indian subcontinent and is a location where one of Sati's (wife of Lord Shiva) limbs, her right arm is reported to have fallen. Its half shaktipeeth among three and half shaktipeeth of Maharashtra.

== Geography ==
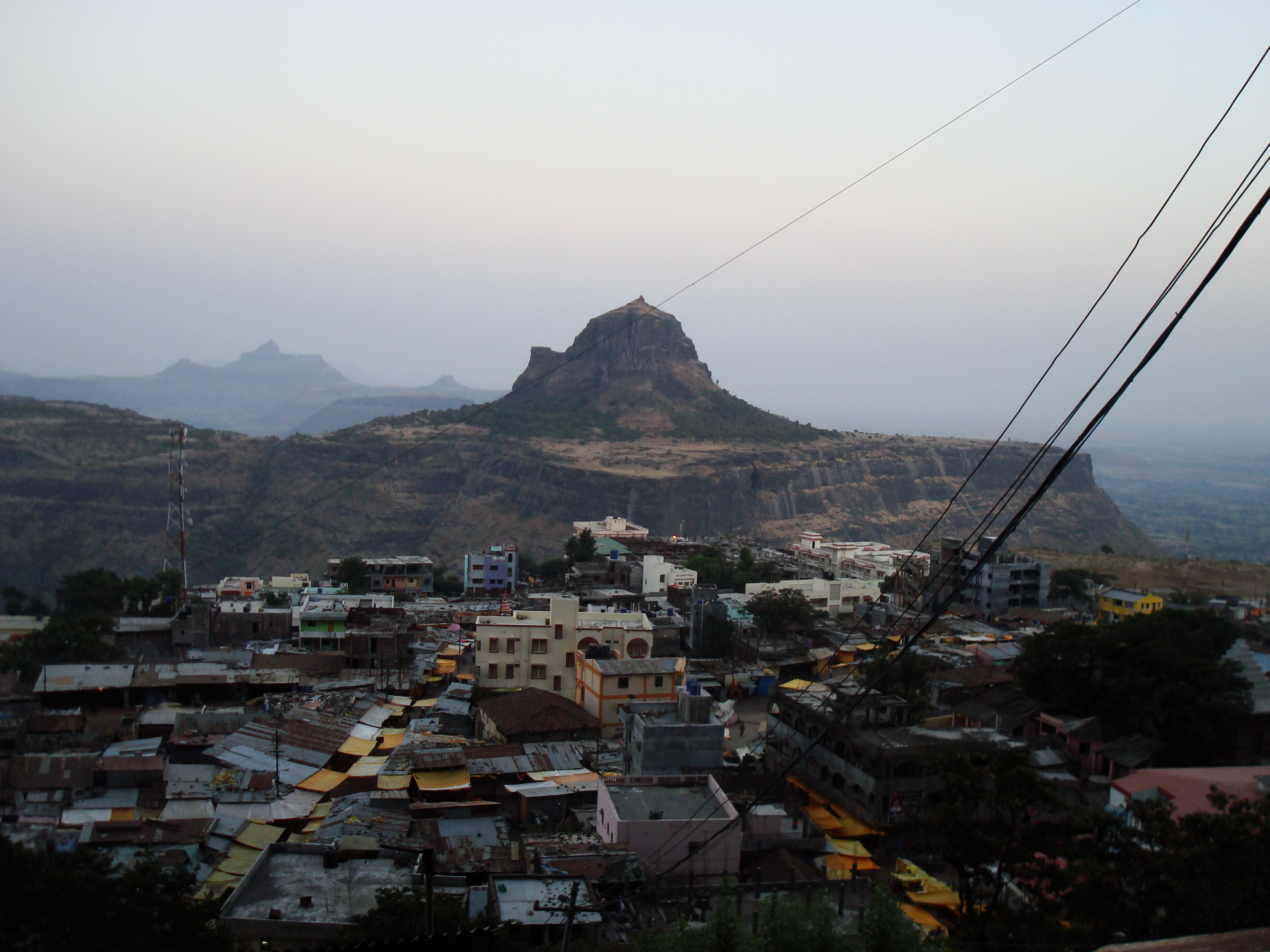
Vani village viewed from Saptashrungi gad. The peak opposite to the temple is the Markandeya hill.

Saptashrungi is a hill range consisting of seven hills locally called Ghads and form part of the Sahyadri Range of hills in Western Ghats. Sahyadri Range is also known as Ajanta Satmala Range and the average height of the peaks is 4,500 feet (1,400 m). The Dhodap, in the center of this mountain range, is the highest peak with an elevation of 4,600 feet (1,400 m), and Saptashrungi is towards its west. There are 108 water bodies (ponds) located in the watershed of these hills, which are called Kundas. Nanduri, Kalwan and Vani are the villages nearest to the temple, which are situated at the foot of the hills. There are many approaches to reach the top of the temple location. The route from Nashik and Vani via Dindori is 39 kilometres (24 mi) and via Pimpalgaon Baswant is 51 kilometres (32 mi). The route via Nadurgaon village is the easiest and is 14 kilometres (8.7 mi) from Vani. It is at a distance of 60 kilometres (37 mi) from Nashik, the district headquarters. The State Highway 17 (Maharashtra) (SH-17) connected with the National Highway 3 (NH 3) links Nashik with the temple site near the villages of Vani and Nanduri. Bus facilities by state transportation are available to reach the temple precincts. The forests in the hills are reported to have medicinal herbs. There is a circumlocutory path used by pilgrims to do parikrama around the temple. This path is in an elevation range between 1,230 metres (4,040 ft) and 1,350 metres (4,430 ft), and is stated to be in steep rock topography. The hills are covered with verdant forests.

== Background ==
Three and a half Shakta pithas (prominent seats of the Hindu Goddess) are reported in Maharashtra. These four Goddess temples are Mahalakshmi Temple at Kolhapur, Tulja Bhavani Temple at Tuljapur, Renuka Temple at Mahur (Matripur) and the Saptashrungi Temple of Vani. These four temples are also interpreted to represent the four parts of holy AUM, A kara, U kara, Ma kara and Mmm kara (Ardha matra). Though which of these is a ardha-peetha (a half Shakta pitha, considered lower in importance to a complete Shakta pitha) is disputed, Saptashrungi is generally regarded to be a half Shakta pitha. However, the official site of the temple declares it as a complete Shakta pitha. The three presiding deities of the Goddess-oriented scripture Devi Mahatmya in the Saptashrungi are considered a combined manifestation of the three goddesses which are equated with Mahalakshmi of Kolhapur, Mahasaraswati of Tuljapur and Mahakali of Mahur.

The Devi Bhagavata Purana mentions Saptashringa hills as a Shakta pitha. However, no other major religious scriptures accord the Saptashrungi temple this status.

The presiding goddess of the temple is also known by other names as: Saptashrungi ("(goddess) of seven hills"), Saptashrunga-nivasini ("one who resides on Saptashrunga – the seven hills"), Saptashrunga-mata ("the mother-(goddess) of Saptashrunga"). The suffix Devi (goddess) may be added to the first two names. She is also known as Brahmasvarupini ("one who has form of Brahman"). The goddess is reported to have appeared from the kamandalu (water-pot) of the creator-god Brahma.

The Goddess had taken the form of Durga (exalted in the Devi Mahatmaya) and slew the buffalo-demon Mahishasura, who troubled the universe. After that the Goddess is believed to be settled here. As the Goddess took form here and resided at Saptashrungi, it is considered the original location of the Goddess.

== Legends ==
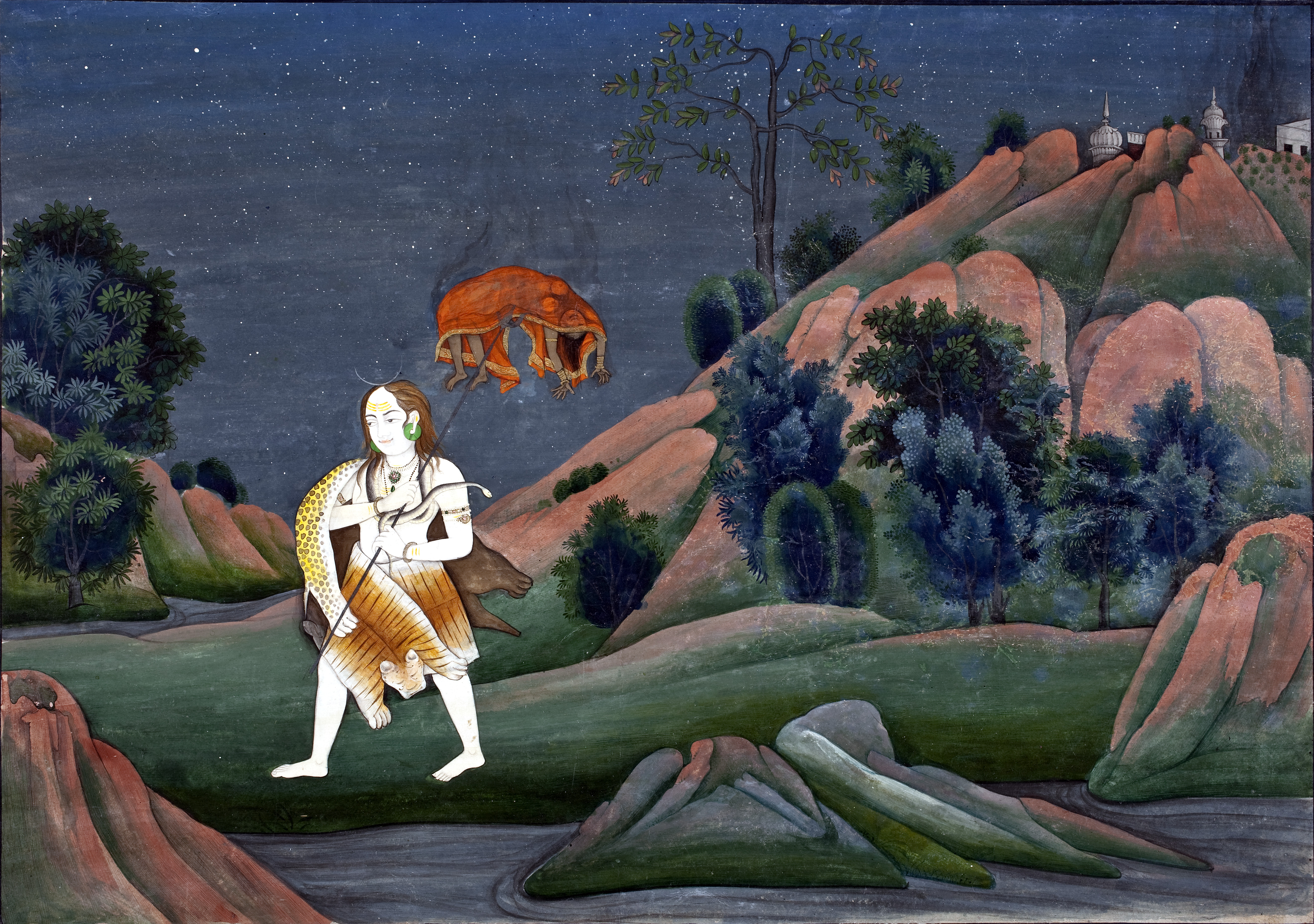
Shiva carrying the corpse of Sati Devi

This temple is one among the 51 Shakta pithas located on the Indian subcontinent and is a location where one of Sati's limbs, her right arm is considered to have fallen when grief-stricken and agitated Shiva was carrying her dead body round the world on his shoulders, and Vishnu had cut her body into pieces with his Sudarshana Chakra. The story behind this event is that King Prajapati Daksha, father of Sati, was performing a yagna (yagna is defined as a Hindu fire ritual sacrifice when deities of the Vedic times like Agni, the fire god, and others were invoked by offering oblations such as ghee (clarified butter), milk, grains and so forth) called as Brihaspatirityadi. Sati who was Lord Shiva's wife, attended the function without invitation. Daksha who was not fond of his son-in-law, as he considered him a mendicant, purposely did not invite him for the yagna, while he invited all other gods. Sati felt deeply insulted by the slight shown by her father towards her husband whom she had married out of deep love. Even then she decided to attend the yagna uninvited by her own father. When she went there, her father compounded the insult by totally ignoring her presence and vilifying Shiva. Sati felt deeply humiliated and hurt, and then in frustration she jumped into the yagna fire and committed suicide. When this news was conveyed to Shiva, first he sent his assistant to the site to enquire and take revenge. Shiva also came to the yagna site and created a furor. In a state of grief and anger he put Sati's dead body on his shoulders and started wandering round the universe. Looking at this grave situation, Brahma and Vishnu decided to intervene and bring back Shiva to his normal self. It was then decided that Vishnu will follow behind Shiva, and with his Sudarsha Chakra cut Sati's dead body into pieces. Thus Vishnu cut her into 51 pieces (108 pieces are also mentioned in many Puranic texts) as Shiva traveled around the world and these fifty one body parts of Sati fell at different locations in the subcontinent, and all these places came to be known as Shakthi Peethas (abode of goddess Shakthi or Durga). Her right arm fell on the Saptashrungi hills and the place became holy, and a Shakthi Peeth came to be established here.

It is also said that when the demon king Mahishasura was creating havoc in the forests, the devatas and people urged Durga to kill the demon. Then the 18 armed Saptashrungi Devi took the form of Durga and slayed Mahishasura, and since then she is also known as Mahishasura Mardhini. Mahishasura was in the form of a buffalo. At the foot of the hill, from where one starts climbing the steps, there is the head of a buffalo, made in stone, which is believed to be of demon Mahishasura.

In the epic Ramayana war, when Lakshmana was lying unconscious in the war field, Hanuman came to Saptashrungi hills in search of medicinal herbs to restore his life.

Saptashrung mountain was a part of the forest called Dandakaranya mentioned in the Ramayana. It is mentioned that Lord Rama, along with Seeta, and Lakshmana had come to these hills to pray to the goddess and seek her blessings.

In the hill of Markandeye, named after Sage Markandeya, there is a cave which is said to have been the abode of the sage. This hill is located to the east of Saptashringi and a deep ravine divides the two hills. While staying in this cave, Markandeya is believed to have recited puranas (Hindu scriptures) to entertain the Devi.

Another local myth is that a tiger resides in the garbagriaha (sanctum sanctorum) every night and a keeps a watch on the temple but goes away before sunrise.

Yet another myth is that when a person was trying to destroy a beehive, the Devi appeared before him to prevent the act.

There are many other recent narratives extolling the divinity of the goddess, which are also linked to Shirdi Sai Baba and his devotees. In one such narration, a priest of Vani village known as Kakaji Vaidya who was working in the Saptashrungi Temple was quite disturbed by the miseries of life around him and he, therefore, appealed to the goddess to give him peace of mind and relieve him from all worries. Pleased with the priest's devotion to her, the goddess appeared to him in a dream and told him to go to the Baba to set his mind at rest and in peace. As the priest was then not aware of which Baba she meant, he thought it was the Shiva at Trimabakeshwar temple and so he went there and offered worship to Shiva and stayed there for a few days. In the process, he still did not get the feeling of peace and his restless mood continued. He came back to Vani village disheartened. Then, every day after taking bath in the morning he offered prayers to Shiva Linga by reciting Rudra mantra from the Yajurveda, for many days. He still did not get peace of mind. He then went back to the Mata temple and appealed to her to give relief to his restless mind. That night she appeared in his dream and told that the Baba she meant was Sai Samarth of Shirdi and that he should go there. The priest did not know the whereabouts of Sai Baba. Sai Baba through his divine psychic perception realised the need of the priest and so he sent his most loving devotee Madhavarao to meet the priest and bring him to his presence. Coincidentally, Madhavrao had also gone there at the advice of Baba to also offer two silver breasts to the goddess as his mother had forgotten to fulfill her vow of gifting the silver breasts to the goddess. When Madhavarao went to Vani village the priest met him and came to know that he had come from Shirdi to offer silver breast to the goddess. The priest was very pleased, and also for the first time felt peace of mind. He then took Madhavarao to the temple where the silver breasts were placed at the feet of the goddess in the sanctum as a fulfilment of his mother's vow. The priest then came to Shirdi with Madhavarao and had darshan of the Sai Baba and stayed there for 12 days and felt very peaceful. He then returned to Vani.

== Features ==
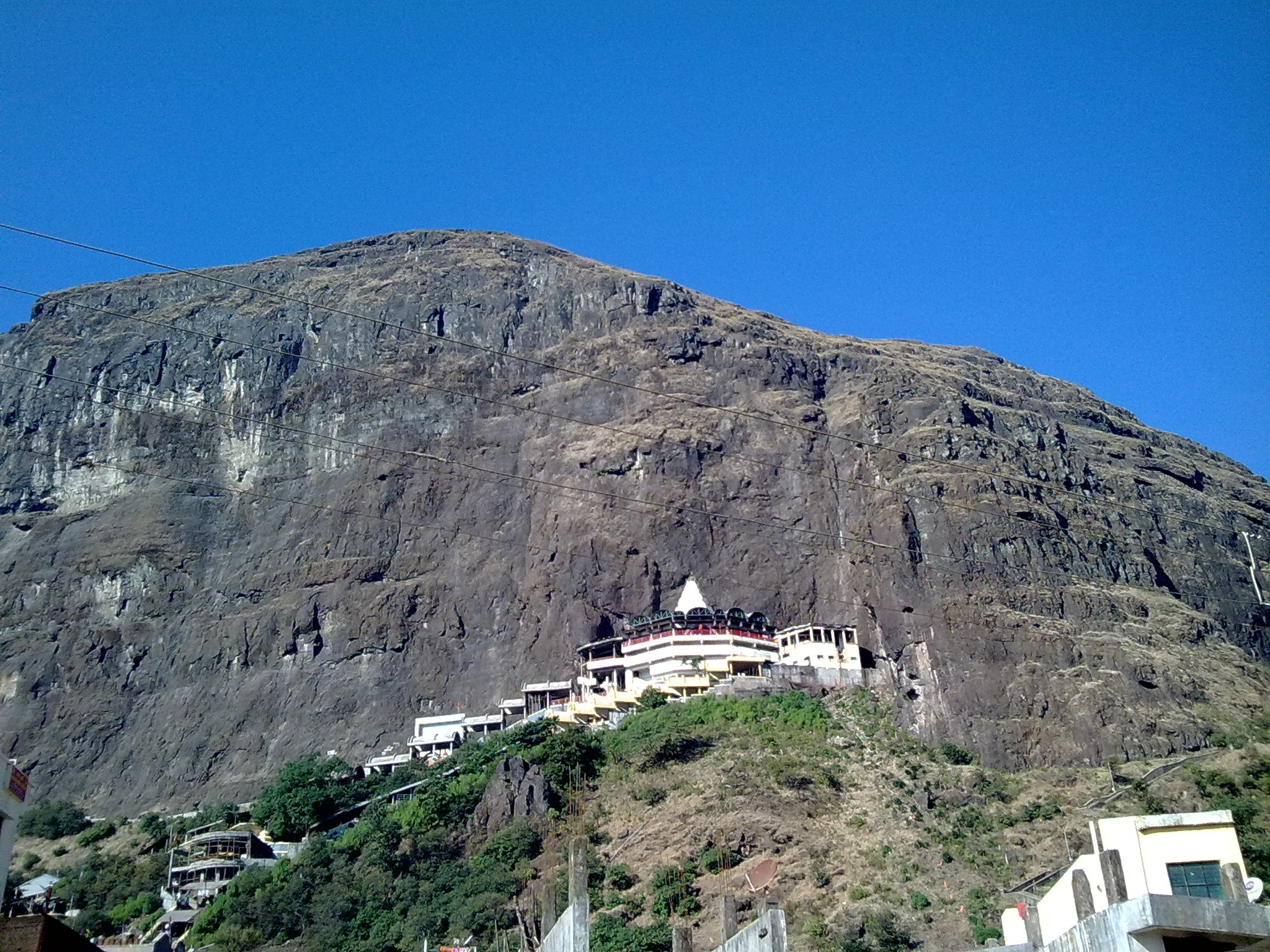
Saptashrungi Devi Temple on top of hill range

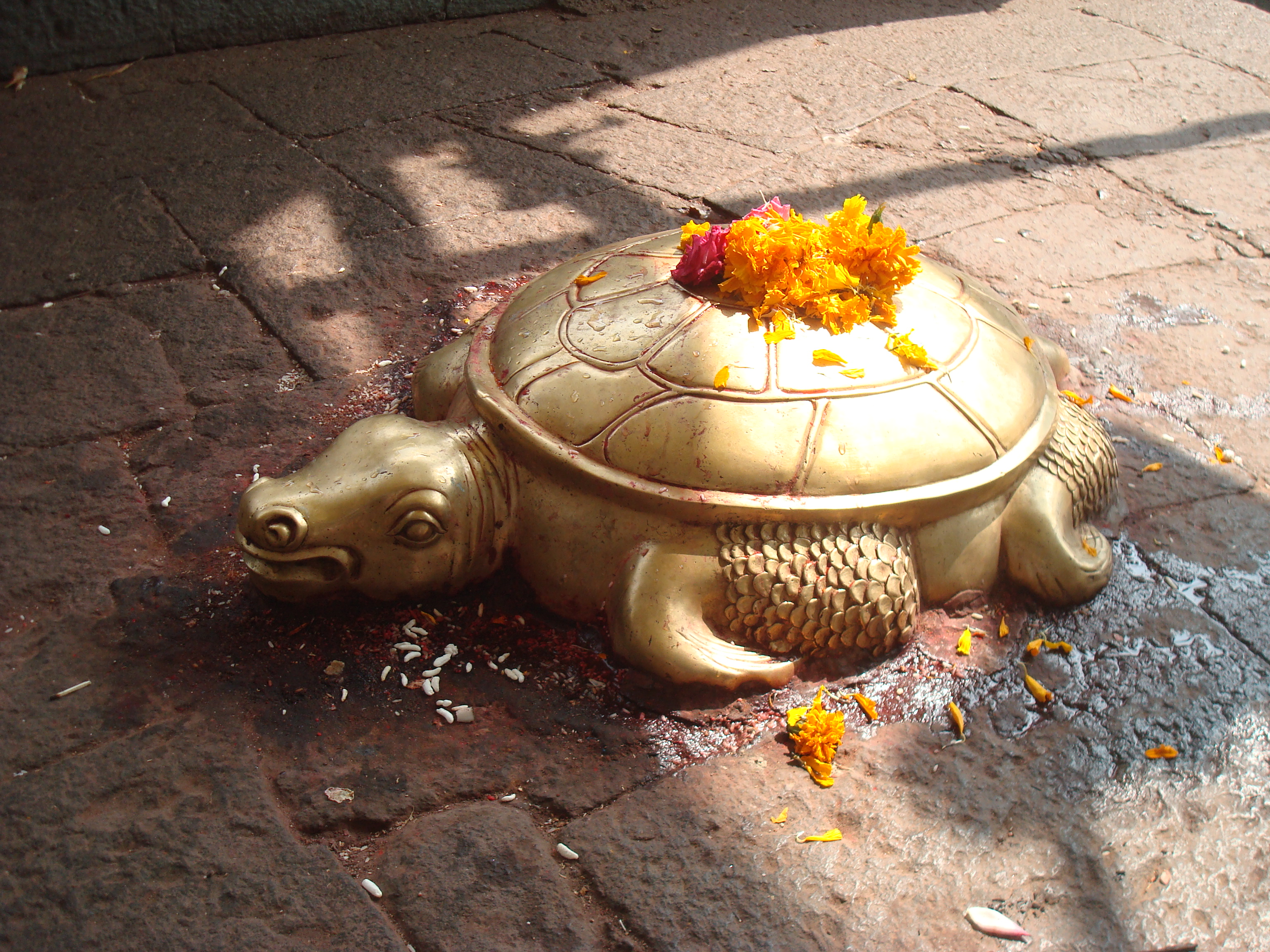
Kurma at Saptashrungi Devi Temple

Saptashrungi Temple is two storied shrine with the Devi enshrined in the top floor. The Devi image is carved in a cave at the base of a sheer scarp rock face.

The Devi is said to be swayambhu (self-manifested) on a rock on the sheer face of a mountain. She is surrounded by seven (sapta in Sanskrit) peaks (shrungain Sanskrit), hence the name: Sapta Shrungi Mata (mother of the seven peaks).

The iconography of the Saptashrungi goddess is that of the Mahalakshmi of the Devi Mahatmya. The goddess is eighteen-armed (ashta-dasha bhuja), inaccurately sometimes described as ashta-bhuja (eight-armed). The image is about 8 feet (2.4 m) tall and appears saffron in colour, as it is covered with sindoor. As described in the Devi-Mahatmya legend, the goddess was gifted various weapons to slay Mahishasura. She holds these in her arms: the trishula (trident) of Shiva, the sudarshana chakra of Vishnu, the shankha (conch) of Varuna, the flames of the fire-god Agni, the bow and arrow of Vayu, the vajra (thunderbolt) and ghanta (bell) of Indra, Danda (cudgel) of Yama, akshamala (string of beads) of Daksha, kamandalu (water-pot) of Brahma, the rays of the sun-god Surya, the sword and shield of Kali, the parashu (axe) of Vishvakarma, the wine-cup of Kubera, gada (mace), lotus, lance and pasha (noose).

The Devi is decorated with high crown (like a papal tiara), and a gold nose-ring and gold necklaces which are the ornaments used every day. Her attire is in the form of a robe with a blouse, which are changed with new dresses every day. Before she is dressed for worship she is religiously given a formal abhisheka or bath; warm water is reported to be used for two days in a week. The courtyard in front of the temple has a trident or Trishula decorated with bells and lamps. There are other precious ornaments of the goddess which are normally kept at Vani in safe custody but are used to decorate the deity on special festival days. The Devi's image is painted bright red with ochre called sindoor, which is considered auspicious in this region; however, the eyes are not touched by the colour but are made of white porcelain, which shine very brightly.

A portico like structure, an addition made to the main shrine of the goddess are attributed to the Satara Commander-in-Chief and the plain structure at the beginning of the last century. Subsequent additions were made by the Chief of Vinchur.

The temple has undergone renovations recently also with creations of many facilities. The facilities created at the shrine consist of over 500 steps) cut into the rock slopes of the hill, from above the road point, leading to the temple entrance, a community hall, a gallery for devotees to form queues and have orderly darshan of the goddess. The steps were built by Umabai Dabhade in 1710 AD. The steps are also seen with figures of Rama, Hanuman, Radha and Krishna, Dattatreya, and of tortoise at a few places on many temples dedicated to Durga or Mata. Before the proper road was built that allowed the buses and vehicles to climb hill and travel till the foot of temple, various routes were formed to climb the hill on foot. One such route was built by Mr. Gopal Kulkarni (honoured with name Gadkari after building these steps) from Kasbe Vani.

It is believed that the Devi Mahatmya, a sacred book which extols the greatness of Devi and her exploits, was composed at this place by the sage Markandeya. He performed rigorous penance on a hill opposite the one where the Devi resides; it is now named after him.

It is said that there is one flag which is said to be hoisted at the top of the mountain where Saptashrungi Devi's temple is situated. It is said that the headman of the village of Burigaon climbs up the hill on Full Moon day in the month of April. On that day, at sunrise in the morning he hoists a flag. The path which he used to climb up and down is kept a secret. It is also said that any person who tries to know this route will lose his eyesight.

During the descent from the temple complex there is a cave on the Mahonidri Mountain, which according to the local myth is from where the goddess Saptashhringi, after defeating the demons, disappeared.

The work of conserving the idol of Shri Saptashrungi Devi, which is half of the three and a half Shakta pithas, was going on since July 21, 2022 and was completed after around 45 days. In the process, approximately 2000 kilograms of sindoor was removed from the idol due to which the very ancient and self-styled form of the idol of Shri Saptashrungi Devi came to the fore. On September 8, 2022, the Prana Pratishtha ceremony of the idol of Shri Saptashrungi Devi was held. On this occasion, the ornaments of the goddess were worshiped in the trust office and a procession of ornaments was taken out. The temple was opened for the devotees from the first day of the Navaratri festival i.e. 26 September 2022.

== Worship ==
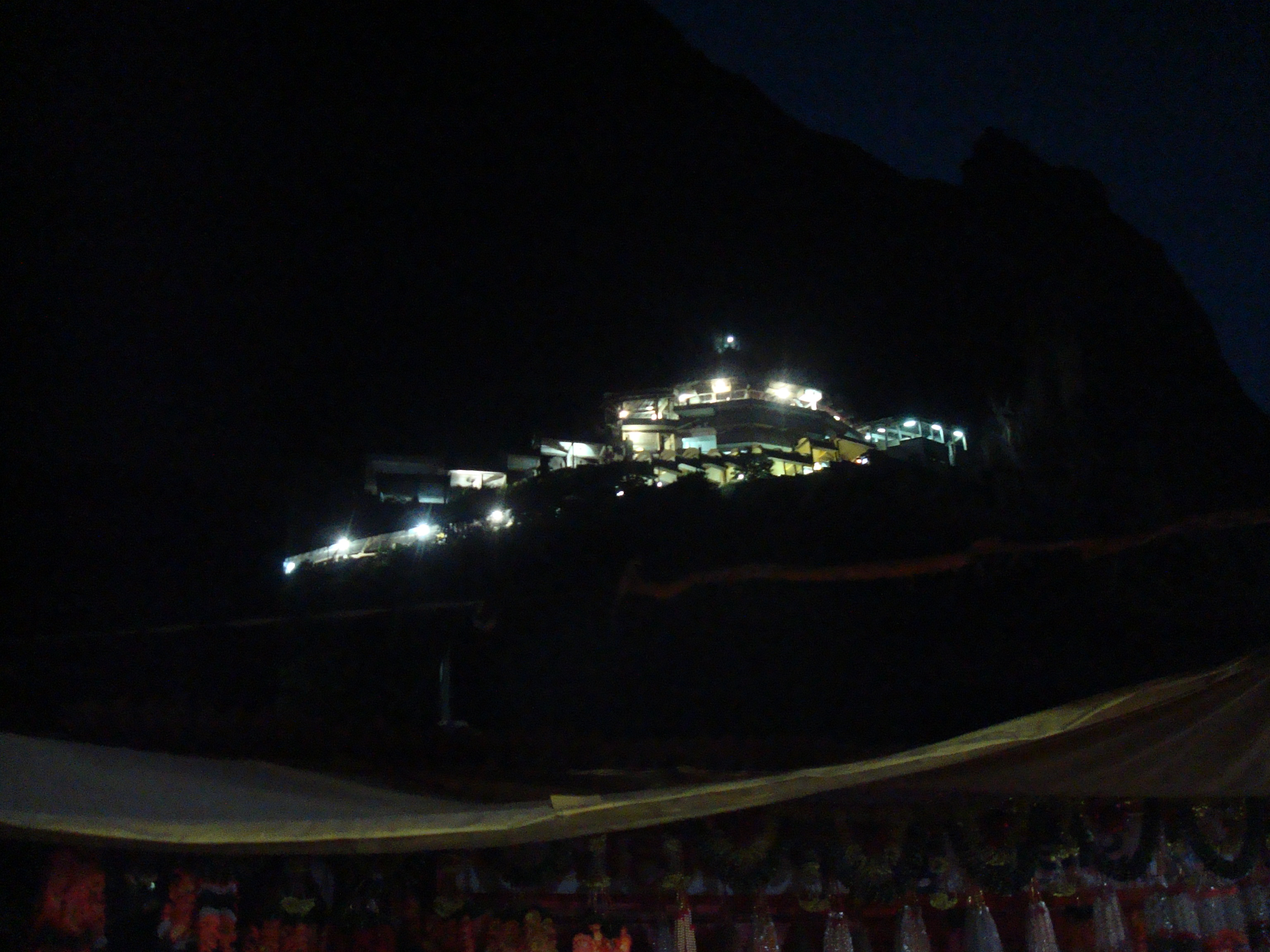
Illuminated view Saptashrungi temple at night

The most important festival of the Saptashrungi temple is Chaitrotsav, "the Chaitra festival". The festival starts on Rama Navami (the ninth lunar day in the bright fortnight of the Hindu month of Chaitra) and culminates on Chaitra Poornima (full moon day), the biggest day of the festival. The festival is also attended specifically by childless women making vows seeking blessings of goddess for children. About 250,000 attend the festival on the final day and as many as 1 million gather on the last three days of the nine-day festival. The devotees come from states of Maharashtra, Gujarat, Madhya Pradesh and Rajasthan. Many devotees also walk all the way from Nashik (60 kilometres (37 mi)), Dhule (150 kilometres (93 mi)) and other towns. Devotees often circumambulate (see pradakshina) the whole hill. Hindus generally circumbulate the deity or the sanctum, however since the goddess's icon is carved on the hill side, the whole hill has to be circumbulated. The goddess is bathed (see abhisheka) with panchamruta (panch meaning five and amruta meaning nectar of immortality), a mixture of usually honey, sugar, milk, yogurt, and ghee, every day during the festival. On the penultimate day (the fourteenth lunar day), the goddess' banner is worshiped and then paraded through the village in attendance of the village head-man (gavali-patil) of Daregaon village and finally hoisted on the hill peak at midnight. On the last day, devotees visit the hill top to take darshan (pay respects to) of the holy flag. This ceremony is reported to be held at least since the 15th century. Devotees who used a navas (vow) fulfill it during the festival.

On this occasion grain, flowers, coconuts, money or ornaments are the offerings made to the deity. After the daily service of abhishek (ritual bath) to the deity with water brought from the Surya kund, offerings of kheer made by boiling rice, milk and sugar is made to the goddess. Cakes made of flour and butter known as turis are also offered. All the offerings, except the ornaments, are then taken away by the Bhopas, who are the hereditary guardians of the temple.

In Ashwin (Hindu calendar month) Shukla Paksha Dashami a big utsav (festival) is held at this place. Dussera and Navaratri are major festivals in the temple when, for nine days, the temple is flocked by thousands of devotees. According to the Hindu Lunar Calendar followed by the temple, Tuesday and Friday and eighth, ninth and fourteenth days are particularly special days for offering pujas (worship) to the goddess. Other festivals celebrated are the Gudi Padwa, Gokulashtami, Navratrotsav, Kojagiri, Laxmipujan, HariHar Bhet and many more, which are attended by a large number of devotees.

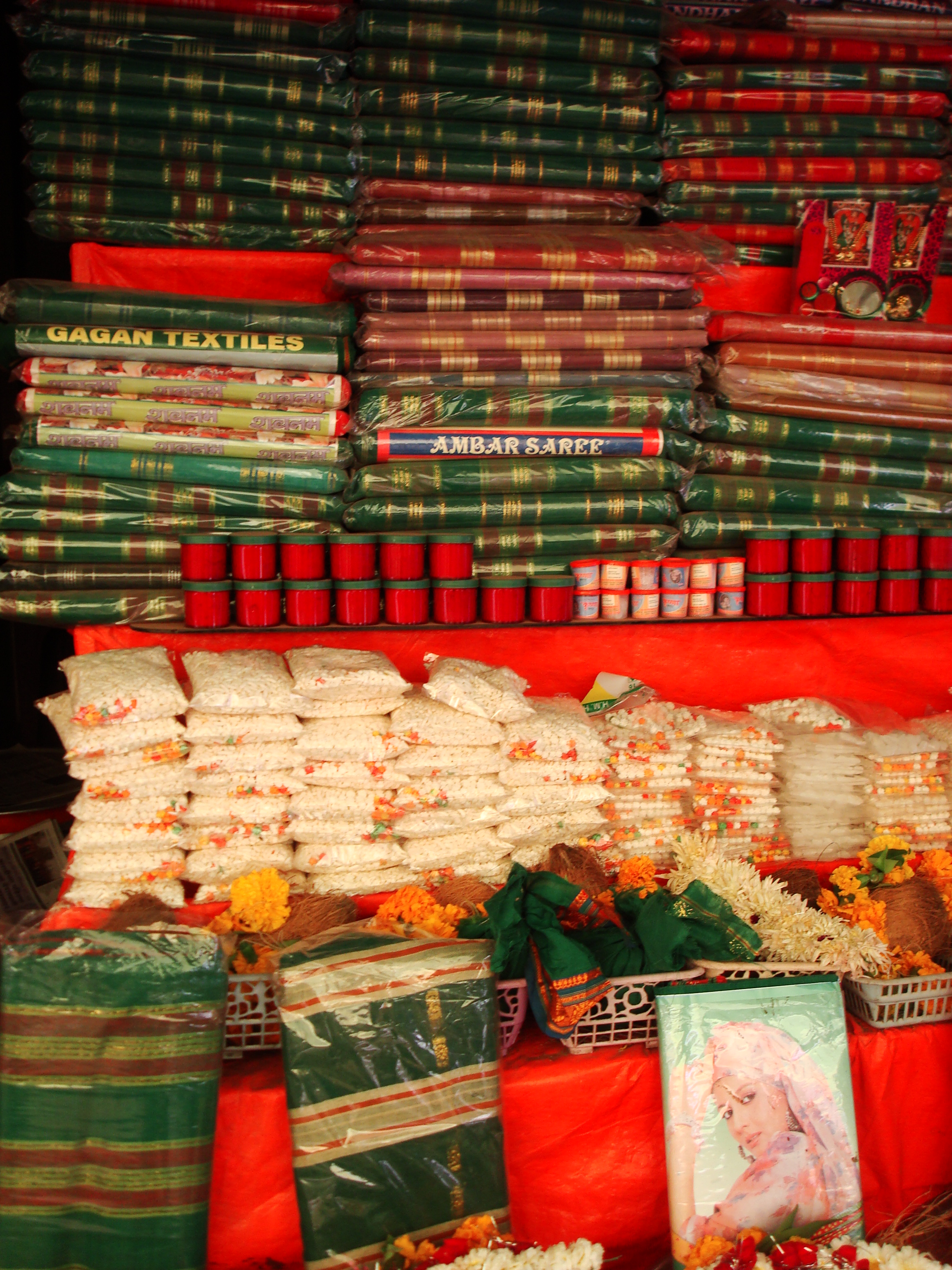
A typical shop selling saris, red Kumkum in bottles, flowers, coconuts and prasad in packets.

The rituals followed by the devotees are in the form of offering coconuts and silk cloth and also Sari and Choli (blouse) to the goddess. Other traditional offerings made to the deity are eyes made of silver, and making a circle of Kumkum in appropriate design around the inner ambulatory passage of the Goddess during Navratra. The Saptashati, which is the biography of goddess, with seven hundred verses, is also recited by many devotees.

The Kathar or Kutadi community of Maharashtra while observing the Pachvi ceremony, after delivery of a child in the family, offer worship to their family deity Saptashrungi and also offer a sacrifice of a goat following this they hold the naming ceremony of the child on the 12th day.

Gondhal, an ancient folk dance-drama is presented before the deity by devotees belonging to Gondali, Bhutye, Aaradhi and Naik communities. Gondhalis who perform the Gondhal dances are also invited to perform the Gondhal during weddings and many major family festivities. The Gondhali performance, usually held at night, is accompanied by singing with accompaniment of cymbals, small drum, Sambal and Tuntune or a single string instrument.

== Protection and facilities ==
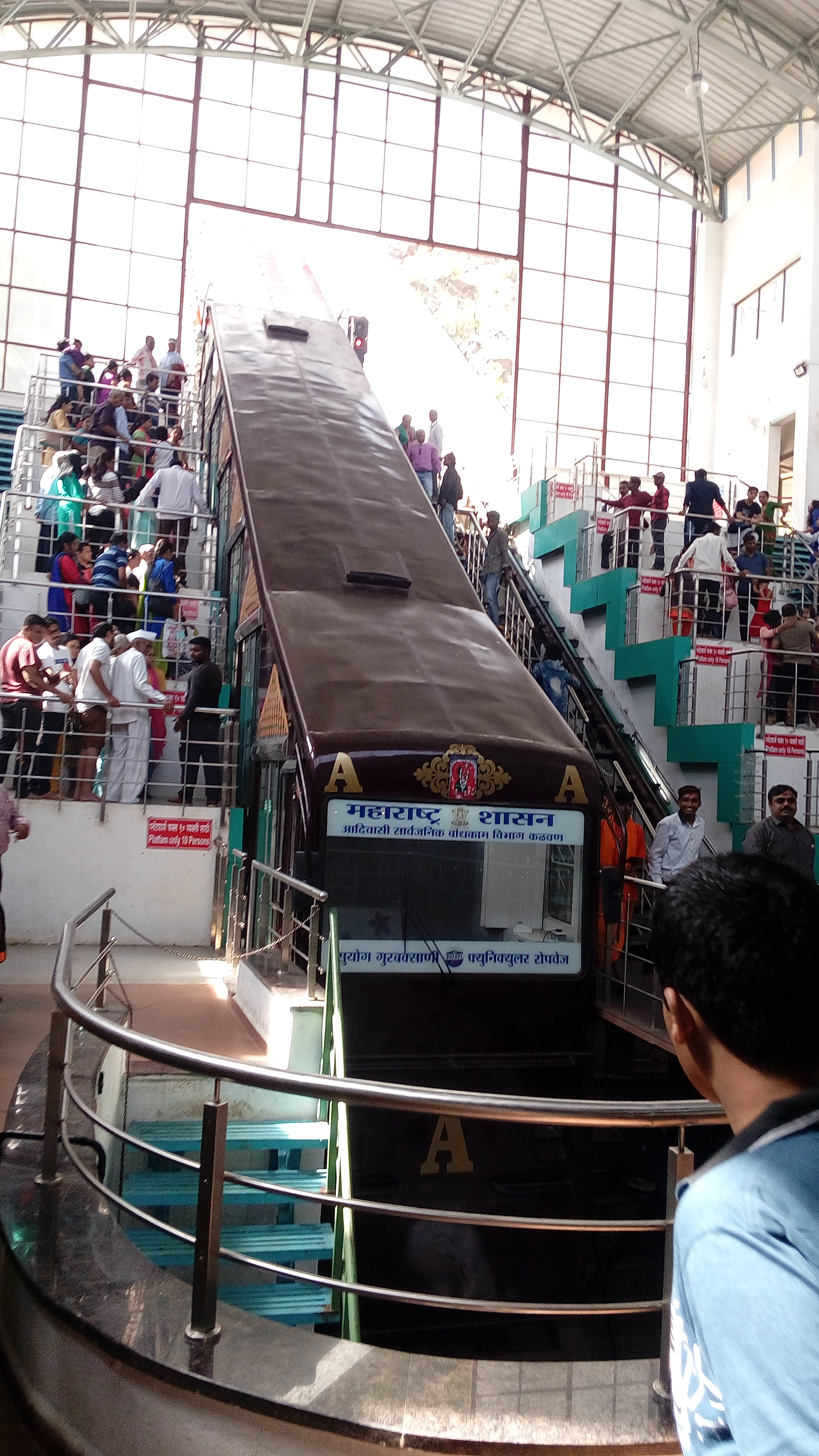
Funicular train at Saptashrungi

The seven hills are in the geological formation of the Deccan Trap comprising hard and amygdaloidal basalts, bole beds (red bole) and lateritic soils. The hill temple has been subjected to frequent damage from rockfalls in the last many years. Many pilgrims have also been injured during these rock falls; some injuries also turning fatal. The circumlocutory path around the hill has steep rock slopes and the instability of the rock formations is attributed to the fractured and columnar joints in basaltic rocks. Hence, this issue has been a subject of study by geologists to provide a solution to prevent damages to the temple and causing injuries to the pilgrims.

In 2018, a funicular train was inaugurated. This was done so that pilgrims can reach the temple within few minutes and comfortably rather than walking up the stairs. Also an elevator is made by which we can reach directly inside the temple.

The route climbing up the hill is also tricky and has seen a few accidents resulting in fatalities. In 2008, a private bus fell into the valley while navigating along a U-turn resulting in deaths of 43 people. Post this incident, a few measures have been taken to prevent such accidents, like erection of barricades and warning signs. Toll collection has also started at the foot of the hill to financially provide for these measures. The measures taken were still reported to be insufficient in a news report by Sakal in 2010. Being a site of mass gathering on various occasions, the temple is also listed on the hit-list of terrorists. Mock drills of emergency situations are conducted by State police.

Providing various facilities for the pilgrims and taking corrective measures of security has been handled by the Shree Saptashrung Niwasini Devi Trust. This Trust was formed in 1975 and since then has brought in various developments. Extra buses are provided by the Maharashtra State Road Transport Corporation during festivals, especially in Chaitrotsav. In 2010, MSRTC reported an income of ₹ 8.6 million from extra buses provided during the eight days of festival. The facilities for overnight stays are also provided at the Bhakta Niwas and meals are available for all visitors at reasonable rates. Various plans have been chalked out by the State Government and the trust for development that include creating the location into a recreational spot along with the current pilgrimage site. Lack of space has been put forth as the major reason for underdevelopment. Vast areas of land space around the site are under the purview of Forest department.
