= Religious significance of rice in India =

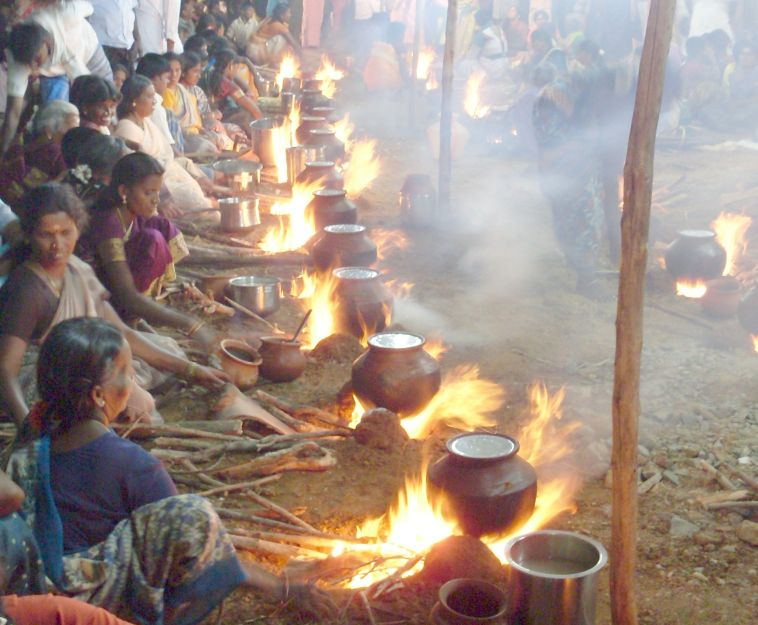
Women cooking rice with jaggery on the morning of the Pongal festival

Rice has religious significance and spiritual heritage in India, and is considered a sacred grain in Hindu scriptures such as the Vedas, Taittirīya Brāhmaṇa, Shatapatha Brahmana, the Mahabharata epic, and in archaeological finds in places such as the holy city of Kashi.

It is used in various religious life rites of passage in India such as: dry rice with 'akshata' smeared with red vermilion; nāmakaraṇa – naming ceremony of the new born child; annaprashana – a ritualistic first feeding of a child; as an offering of cooked rice to the sacrificial fire in the yajña kuṇḍa; and in the Mahabharata.

In Tamil Nadu, it is worshipped as Ponni Amman. In Manipur and northeastern India, rice cultivation rites form an important part in the life of the farmer. The largest harvest festivals in the country are inextricably linked to the time when rice is harvested; invariably held during mid-January. These festivals are Bihu in Assam, Pongal in Tamil Nadu, Makara Sankranti in Karnataka and in the northern and the western states of India.

== History ==
Rice is a sacred grain in India. The Atharvaveda defines rice as the "sons of heaven who never die". According to the Taittirīya Brāhmaṇa, the god of rice is called Annadevata, the ancestor of the sacrifice, and also admonishes people to not decry the role of rice. Shatapatha Brahmana says rice emerged from the body of Indra, and further elaborates: "[f]rom his marrow his drink, the soma juice flowed, and became rice: in this way his energies, or vital power, went from him". Archaeological findings indicate that rice was first cultivated in the region around Kashi.

== Religious uses ==
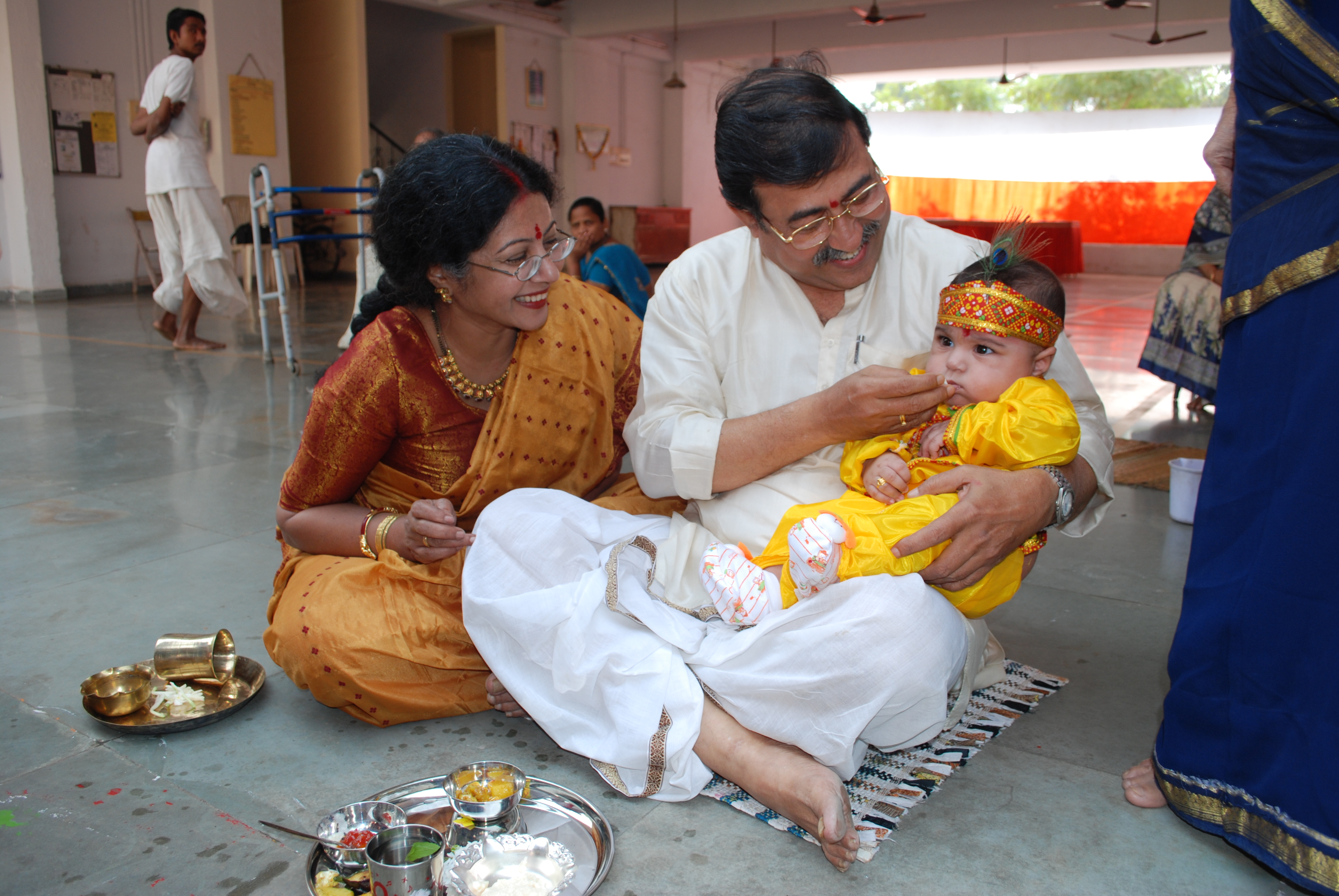
The rite of Annaprashana, a ritualistic first feeding of a child conducted in the child's sixth or seventh month of life

Rice grains are used in the form of blessings known as akshata. Dry rice is smeared with red vermilion and applied on the forehead of persons as it is said to bestow favourable characteristics. It is one of the navadanya, the nine sacred grains used in sacred ceremonies. During Hindu religious ceremonies, another use of rice is as a 'havis' offering of cooked rice to the sacrificial fire in the yajña kuṇḍa, propitiating gods. Rice smeared with turmeric powder is sprinkled over worshippers and the newly married couple as a blessing. Only rice can form the base called asanam (seat) for placing the sacred kalasha (pot) upon it during religious celebrations. In certain regions of India, the bride and bridegroom stand on a heap of rice during the marriage ceremony.

In funeral rites of diverse forms, dry rice or sodden rice is placed at or near the mouth of the corpse by all relatives of the dead person, which is a rite generally done before taking the body to the crematorium. Cooked rice in white colour is also used to denote a pure soul.

== Festivals ==
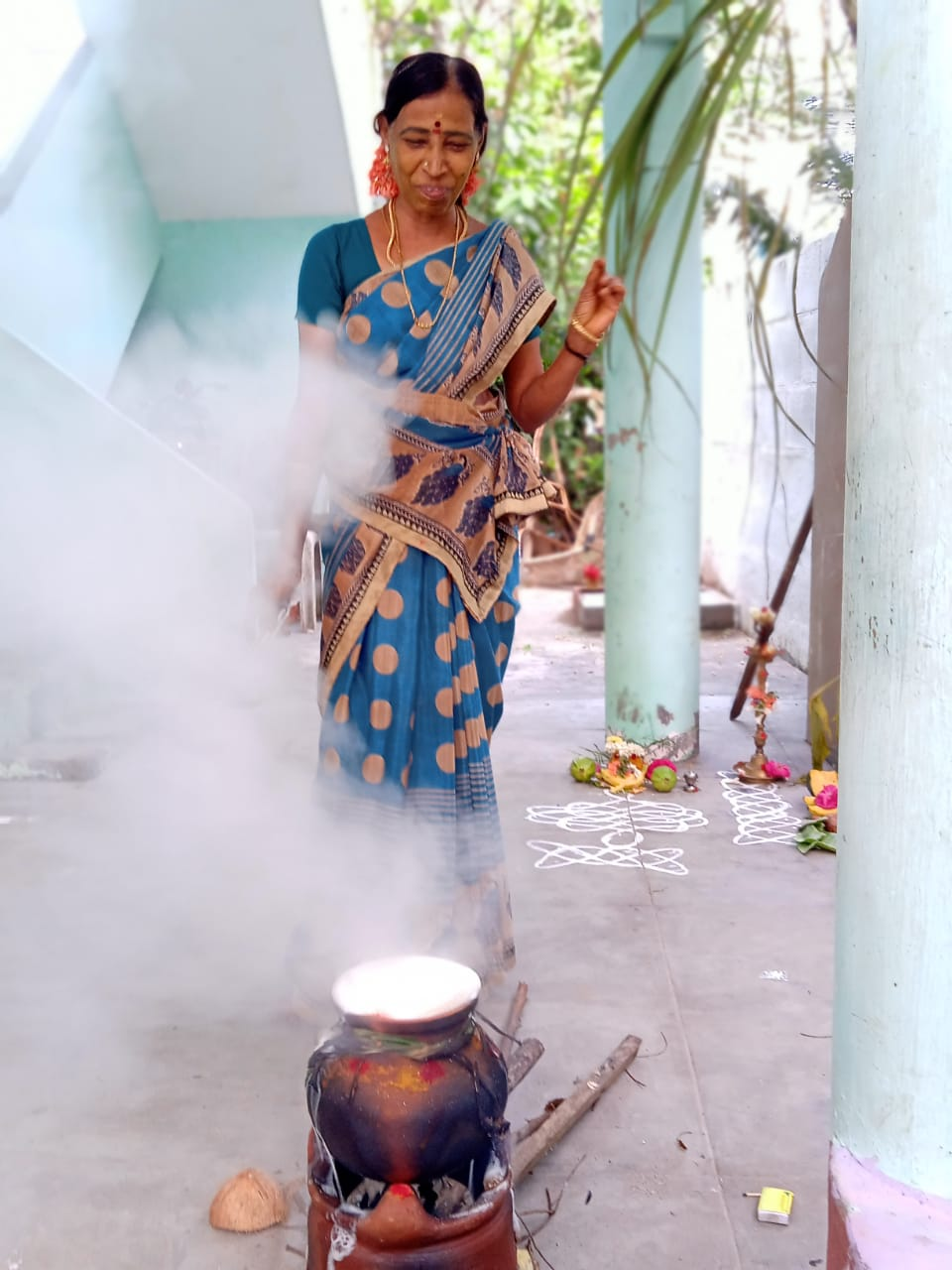
Pongal, a dish of rice and jaggery cooked for the Pongal festival

Festivals are linked to pre-sowing, sowing, pre-transplanting, transplanting, invoking the rain gods, protecting and pre-harvesting. Pongal was the biggest and still the most celebrated festival in India. On the day of Makara Sankranthi, cows and bullocks are washed and beautifully decorated, clothed, horns painted, decked with flowers and fed with Pongal recognising their total involvement in the agricultural process of giving milk and tilling the land.

In Coorg district in Karnataka, a festival called the Huttari festival with 'pudda ari' (transl. new rice) is celebrated during the rice harvest season, during January, with great fervour. There is no Brahmin interference at the time as the celebration which held for a number of days after tasting fresh rice includes consumption of brandy and pork, widely as part of the celebrations.

During the harvest season in Kerala, "niraputhari" rituals are held in temples, where new rice (puthari) is offered to the deity.
