= Harishchandra Range =

Spur of the Western Ghats in India

Coordinates: 19.5000196°N 73.4897002°E

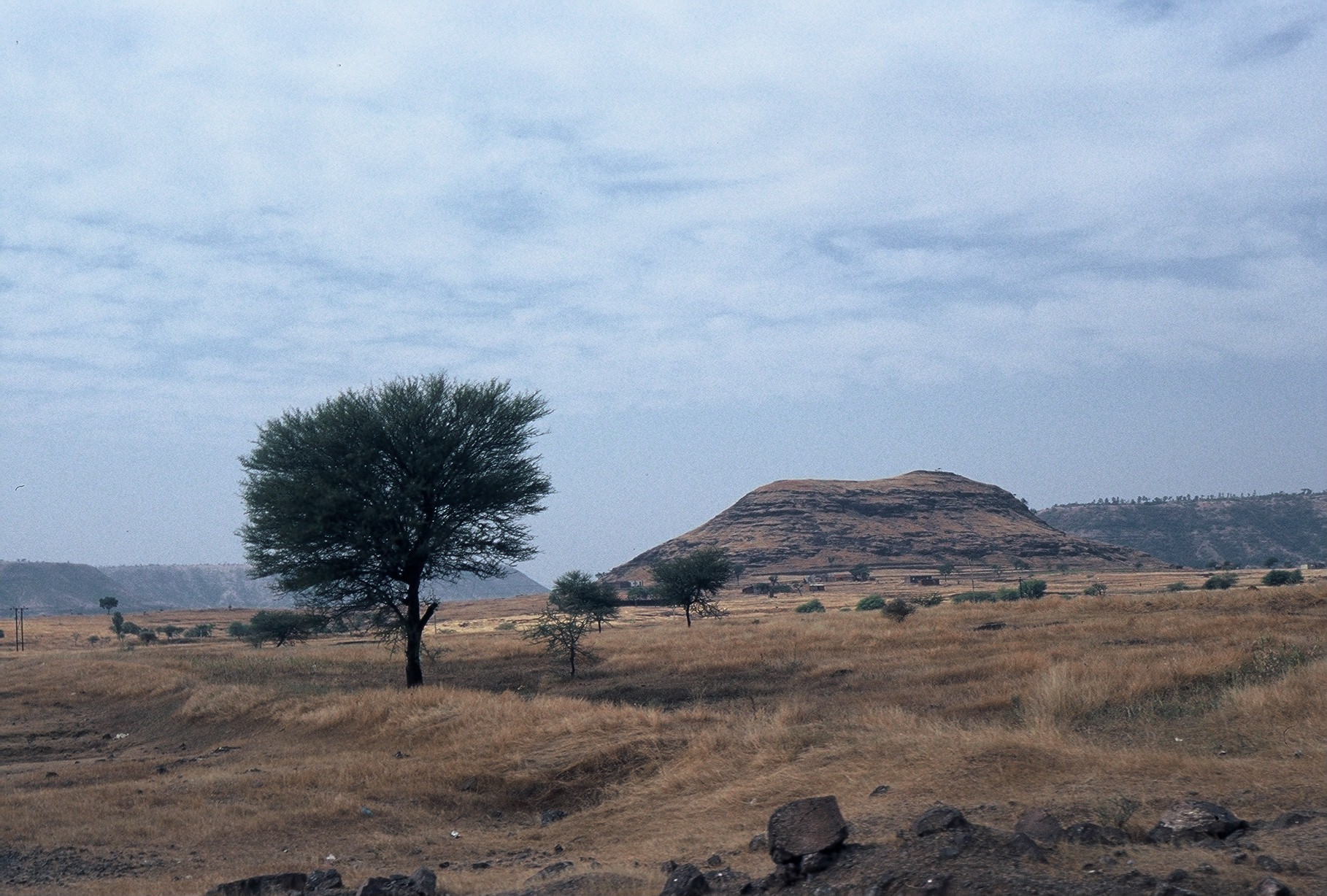
Harischandra Range as seen from the Pune – Nasik road

The Harischandra Range is a spur of the Western Ghats in Maharashtra, India. It runs in a northwest to southeast direction stretching from northeast of Pune district through Ahmednagar and Beed to Osmanabad district. It lies between the Godavari and the Bhima rivers and acts as a water divide between the Godavari and Krishna River basins. These are low-lying hills with an average elevation of only 600 metres (1,970 ft) and they gain in elevation towards the northwest. Geologically, these hills are similar to the Deccan Plateau and are composed of basaltic lava deposits. The range derives its name from the Harischandragarh peak, a popular trekking spot and the highest peak of the range. The hills are covered under deciduous forests especially teak but much of it has been degraded due to the rapid industrialisation and urbanisation in this region. The city of Ahmednagar is the largest in this region.
