= Balaghat Range =

Low elevation mountain range

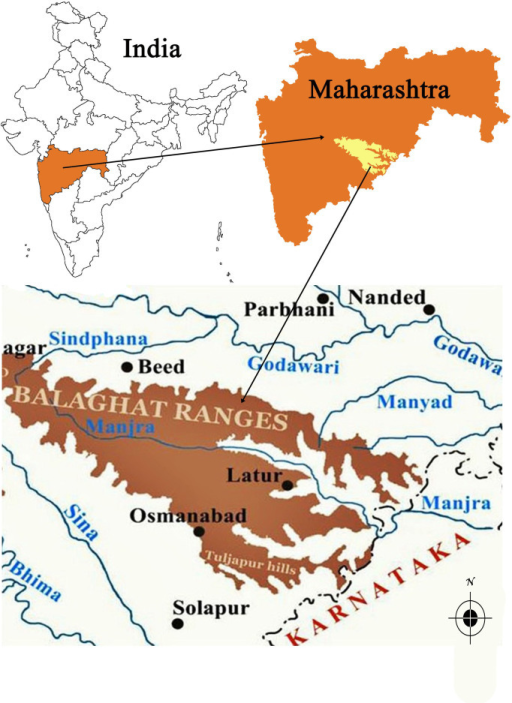
From: Gore, R; Gaikwad, S (2015). "Checklist of fabaceae lindley in balaghat ranges of maharashtra, India". Biodivers Data J. 3 (3) e4541. doi:10.3897/BDJ.3.e4541. PMC 4355649. PMID 25829859.

Balaghat range is a mountain range of low elevation in the Maharashtra state of India. Balaghat Range runs south-eastwards from Western Ghats at the Harishchandra Range to the border of Maharashtra and Karnataka states. It extends about 320 kilometers. The range traverses the districts of Ahmednagar, Beed, Latur, Osmanabad and Solapur in Maharashtra.

The mountain range has width between five and nine kilometers. Balaghat hills at their western edge have a higher elevation of 550–825 meters which are much higher than the eastern edge. These hills are with flat tops. The range separate Godavari River basin in the north from Bhima River basin in the south.
