= Dewas Tekri =

Hindu temple in India

Dewas Tekri, Dewas
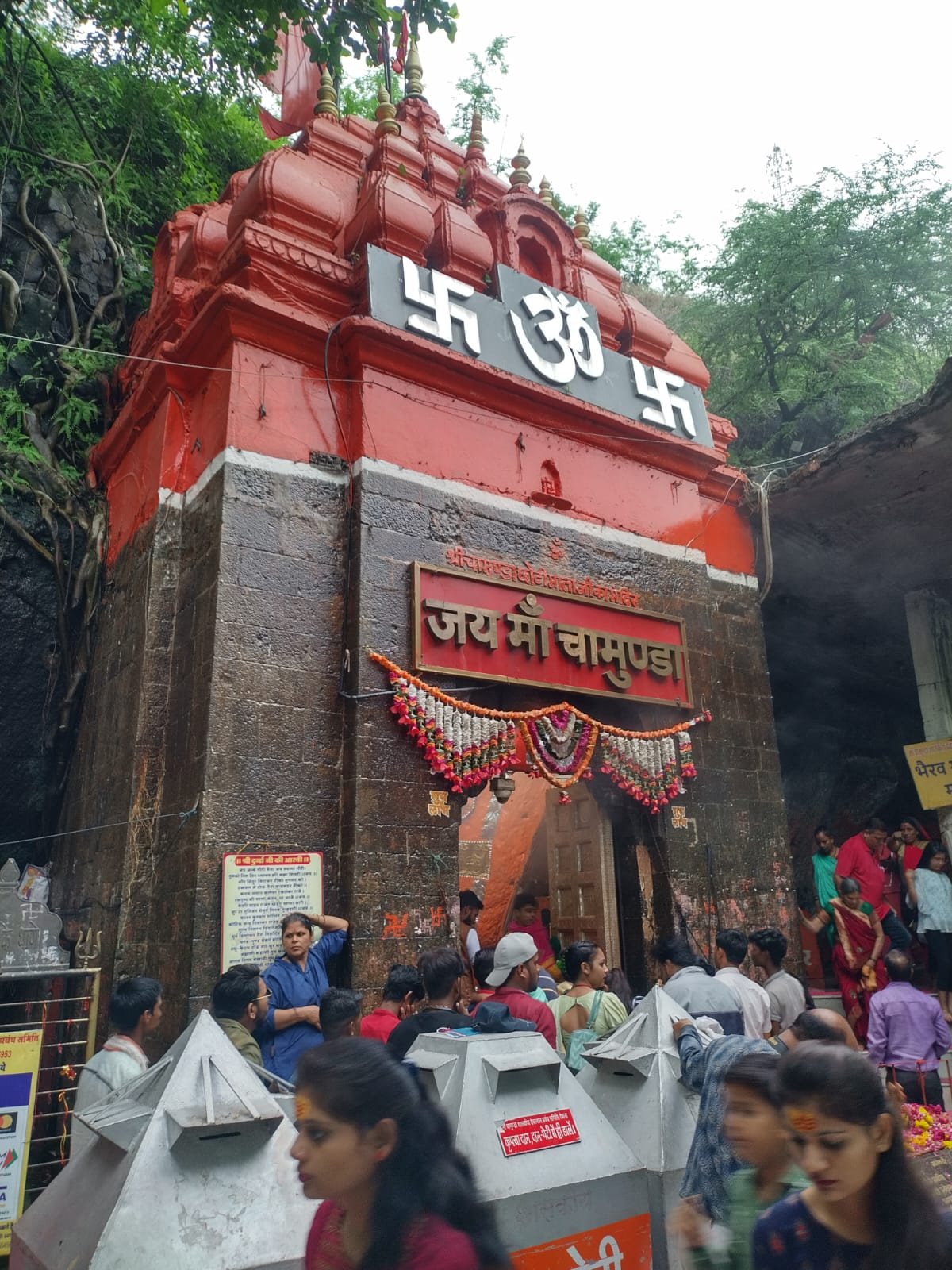
- Dewas Tekri, Dewas

- Location in Dewas, Madhya Pradesh Dewas Tekri (India)

Religion
- Affiliation: Hinduism
- Deity: Chamunda, Tulaja Bhavani, Kali
- Festival: Navaratri

Location
- Location: Dewas
- State: Madhya Pradesh
- Country: India
- Interactive map of Dewas Tekri, Dewas
- Coordinates: 22°58′15″N 76°3′28″E

Dewas Tekri (also known as Maa Chamunda Tekri, Dewas Mata Tekri, and Devi Vaishini Hill) is a sacred mountain located in the city of Dewas, Madhya Pradesh, India. Tekri is known for its religious significance as it houses two important shrines: the Devi Chamunda Mata Temple and the Devi Tulja Bhavani Mata Temple. There are several other temples, including the Kalika Mata Temple, Hanuman Temple, Bhairav Baba Temple, Kho Kho Mata Temple, and Annapurna Mata Temple. The word 'Tekri' means 'hill' in the local language. The main festival celebrated at Tekri is Navaratri, during which people from all over the country come to seek the blessings of Mata.

== Geography ==
Dewas Tekri is situated in the middle of the city. It's just a 5-minute walk from Dewas Bus Stand and Dewas Railway Station. The nearest airport Devi Ahilya Bai Holkar Airport is 53 kilometers away. The temples on the hilltop can be accessed via stairs, a sliding path, or a ropeway. The height of Tekri is above 300 feet.

== Origin ==
Legend has it that Dewas Tekri is a Rakt Peeth (Shakta pitha), where a few drops of Mata Sati's blood fell. At this place, amidst the hills, goddess Raktvahini Chamunda Mata and self-manifested Tulja Bhavani appeared.

== History ==
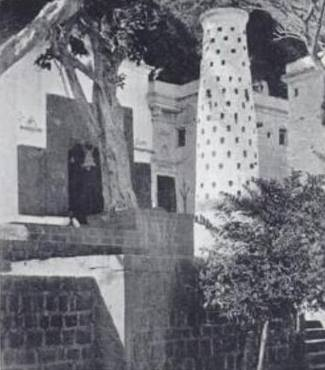
An old photograph of Goddess Chamunda Mata's Temple on Dewas Tekri

There is a disagreement about the age of Tekri. Some sources claim it dates back to the 9th century, while others suggest it to be 1100–1200 years old. Additionally, some believe that it originates from ancient times, known as "anaadi kaal."

E. M. Forster in his book The Hill of Devi, has also mentioned that Devi (or Devivasini, the Goddess’ Residence) probably gave Dewas its name. It rose about three hundred feet above the level. Stone steps led up to the dark cave of Chamunda on the top. She was a barbaric vermilion object, not often approached by us. Sometimes there were pilgrimages, and at certain festivals she played a part in the ritual. Who was Chamunda, and how long had she resided up there ? I never found out, but it was agreed that she had been around longer than anyone else.

=== Story of Two Sister ===
According to beliefs, both forms of the Mother Goddess are present in an awakened state on this hill. Tulja Bhavani and Maa Chamunda are believed to be sisters, with Tulja Bhavani being the elder sister and Chamunda Devi the younger. They used to reside together on this hill but had a disagreement, causing them to turn away from each other. Angered, they began to leave their place. Tulja Bhavani started disappearing into the Paatal Lok (underworld), while Chamunda Devi started descending the hill.

Lord Hanuman and Bhairav Baba intervened, requesting the goddesses to calm down and stay. However, by this time, part of Tulja Bhavani's body had already sunk into the underworld. She remained in the same position on the hill, while Chamunda Devi, who was descending, stopped at her current position. This is why Tulja Bhavani faces south and Chamunda faces north. Pilgrims visiting the Tekri perform Parikrama, starting with Tulja Bhavani and concluding with a darshan of Goddess Chamunda.

This is also the reason why Goddess Tulja Bhavani is referred to as Badi Mata (the elder mother) and Goddess Chamunda as Chhoti Mata (the younger mother).

=== Cave to Ujjain ===
It is said that there has been a tunnel built connecting Mata Tekri of Dewas to Ujjain. This tunnel is 45 kilometers long and was used as a secret passage by King Bharthari. It leads from Dewas to Bharthari Cave in Ujjain, through which the king would travel to seek blessings from Mata.

== Festivals ==
During both Chaitra/Vasantik and Ashvin/Shardiya Navaratri, lakhs of pilgrims visit Tekri to seek the blessings of Mata. People visit Dewas Tekri from far away to make wishes. Some people pray that if their wishes are granted, they visit Tekri by climbing to the Mata temple on their knees or by performing full bowing (dandwat pranam) all the way up to the temple.

== See also ==
- Shree Siddhi Vinayak Ganesh Temple, Nagda
