= Nanduri =

Those with the last name Nanduri are said to hail from the village of Nanduru which is near Bapatla and Ponnur, small towns in the Guntur district of Andhra Pradesh, India. There is a village called Nanduru in East Godavari District of Andhra Pradesh as well which leads to some ambiguity.

Those with this last name could be Niyogi Brahmins or Sri Vaishnava Brahmins or they could also be from a caste other than the Brahmin caste. One of the other known caste is Bhatraju. For the most part, those with this last name are predominantly Brahmins. Many have migrated from Nanduru and they have settled in various part of Andhra Pradesh. Some are known to have settled in a village known as Lingala, which in located in the Khammam District of Andhra Pradesh. Lingala is said to have been ruled by kings with the last name Nanduri hundreds of years ago.

People with the last name are also prevalent in the Indian state of Maharashtra. In Maharashtra, near the city Nashik through which the Godavari River flows, there exists a village called Nandur(i), pronounced Nāndūr. Inhabitants of this village are mostly of the Deshastha Brahmin sub-caste.

Notable people with the name Nanduri include:

- Nanduri Venkata Subba Rao, Telugu poet known for his Yenki Paatalu
- Nanduri Prasada Rao, freedom fighter
- Nanduri Ramamohanarao, author, journalist, former editor of Andhrajyothy

Naduri is also the name of a traditional Georgian folk song.

== See also ==
- Onomastics
- Toponymic surname
- Indian name
