= Lohara taluka =

Lohara Tahsil
- tehsil
- Location in Maharashtra, India
- Coordinates: 17°59′N 076°21′E
- Country: India
- State: Maharashtra
- District: Osmanabad

Population (2011)
  - Total: 116,913

Languages
  - Official: Marathi
- Time zone: UTC+5:30 (IST)
- PIN: 413608
- Lok Sabha constituency: Osmanabad
- Vidhan Sabha constituency: Umarga (SC)

Lohara Tehsil is a tehsil/taluka (subdistrict) in Osmanabad district, Maharashtra on the Deccan Plateau of India. Lohara Bk. is the administrative headquarters of the tehsil. There are forty-seven villages in Lohara Taluka.

== Demographics ==
In the 2001 Indian census, Lohara Tahsil recorded 110,163 inhabitants of which 56,629 (51.4%) were male and 53,534 (48.6%) were female, for a gender ratio of 945 females per thousand males.

In the 2011 census, Lohara Tahsil had 116,913 inhabitants and a gender ratio of 930 females per thousand males. The tahsil was 100% rural. The literacy rate in 2011 was 74.83% overall in Lohara Tahsil, with a rate of 83.84% for males and 65.22% for females. In 2011 in Lohara Tahsil, 11.26% of the population was 0 to 6 years of age.

== List of villages ==
1. Achaler
2. Arni
3. Ashta kasar
4. Belwadi
5. Bendkal
6. Bhatangali
7. Bhosga
8. Chincholi kate
9. Chincholi rebe
10. Dastapur
11. Dhanori
12. Ekondi lohara
13. Harali
14. Hipparga sayyad
15. Hippargarava
16. Holi
17. Jewali
18. Kamalpur
19. Kanegaon
20. Karanjgaon
21. Karwanji
22. Kasti Bk.
23. Kasti Kh.
24. Khed
25. Kolnur pandari
26. Kondjigad
27. Lohara Bk.
28. Lohara Kh.
29. Makani
30. Malegaon
31. Mardi
32. Mogha bk.
33. Mogha kh.
34. Murshadpur
35. Nagral
36. Nagur
37. Phanepur
38. Rajegaon
39. Salegaon
40. Sastur
41. Tawshigad
42. Toramba
43. Udatpur
44. Undargaon
45. Vilaspur pandhari
46. Wadgaon
47. Wadgaonwadi

== See also ==
- Achaler
