= Hippargarava =

Village in Maharashtra

Hippargarav Hipparge Rava
- Village
- Location within Maharashtra
- Coordinates: 17.964257°N 76.259729°E
- Country: India
- State: Maharashtra
- District: Osmanabad

Population (2011)
  - Total: 6,031

Languages
  - Official: Marathi
- Time zone: UTC+5:30 (IST)
- Lok Sabha constituency: Osmanabad
- Vidhan Sabha constituency: Umarga (SC)

Hippargarava is a village in Lohara Tahsil, Osmanabad district, within the Indian state of Maharashtra. It is located 8.4 km by road west-southwest of the village of Lohara Bk. and 31.6 km by road east of the town of Tuljapur. The nearest post office is in Lohara Bk.

== Demographics ==
In the 2011 census, had a population of 6,031.
