= Dnyanraj Chougule =

Indian politician

Member of Legislative Assembly, Maharashtra
- In office 2009–2024
- Preceded by: Ravindra Gaikwad
- Succeeded by: Pravin Swami
- Constituency: Umarga

Personal details
- Party: Shiv Sena

Dnyanraj Chougule is a Shiv Sena politician from Osmanabad district. He was a Member of the Legislative Assembly from Umarga Vidhan Sabha constituency of Osmanabad District, Maharashtra, India as a member of Shiv Sena. He has been elected consecutively for 3 terms in the Maharashtra Legislative Assembly for 2009, 2014 and 2019.

== Positions held ==
- 2009: Elected to Maharashtra Legislative Assembly
- 2014: Re-elected to Maharashtra Legislative Assembly
- 2019: Re-elected to Maharashtra Legislative Assembly

== See also ==
- Lohara
- Umarga
