= Osmanabad taluka =

- tehsil
- Dharashiv Taluka
- Location in Maharashtra, India
- Coordinates: 18°11′N 076°09′E
- Country: India
- State: Maharashtra
- District: Osmanabad

Population (2011)
  - Total: 406,647

Languages
  - Official: Marathi
- Time zone: UTC+5:30 (IST)
- Lok Sabha constituency: Osmanabad
- Vidhan Sabha constituencies: Osmanabad and Tuljapur

Osmanabad taluka officially known as Dharashiv taluka is a tahsil/taluka (subdistrict) in Osmanabad district of Maharashtra, India. The town of Osmanabad is the administrative headquarters of the tahsil. There are 110 panchayat villages in Osmanabad Tahsil.

Outside the city of Osmanabad, the tahsil is divided into five revenue circles: Bembli Dhoki Osmanabad (rural), Padoli and Ter.

== Demographics ==
In the 2001 Indian census, Osmanabad Tahsil had a population of 359,234, with 187,063 (52.1%) males and 172,171 (47.9%) females, for a gender ratio of 920 females per thousand males.

In the 2011 census, Osmanabad Tahsil had 406,647 inhabitants, or 24.5% of the total district population. It had a gender ratio of 920 females per thousand males. The tahsil was 72.4% rural. The literacy rate in 2011 was 79.65% overall in Osmanabad Tahsil, with a rate of 87.65% for males and 71.03% for females. In 2011 in Osmanabad Tahsil, 12.1% of the population was 0 to 6 years of age.
