= Tukaram Shrangare =

Indian politician

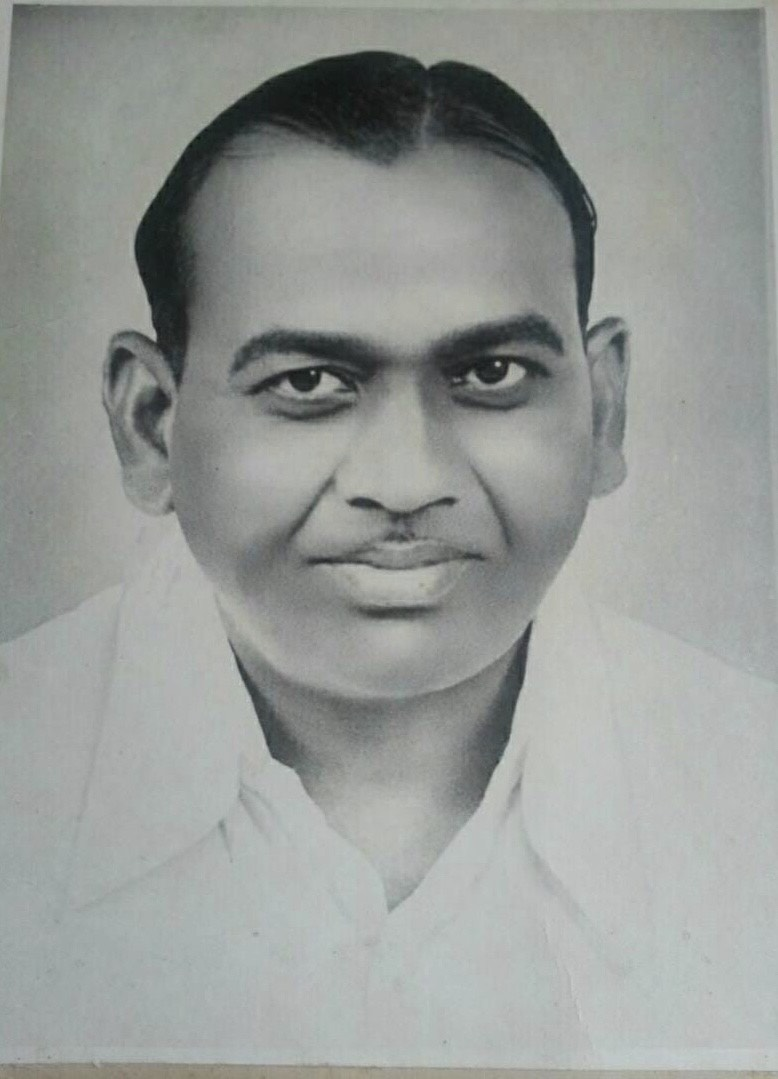

Union Minister of State for Communications
- In office 28 July 1979 – 14 January 1980
- President: Neelam Sanjiva Reddy
- Prime Minister: Charan Singh

Member of Parliament, Lok Sabha
- In office 23 March 1977 – 14 January 1980
- Preceded by: Tulshiram Abaji Patil
- Succeeded by: Trimbak Sawant
- Constituency: Osmanabad, Maharasthra

Personal details
- Born: Tukaram Sadashiv Shrangare; 20 May 1937 Latur, Hyderabad State, British India
- Died: 8 January 2011 (aged 73) Latur, Maharashtra, India
- Citizenship: India
- Party: Indian National Congress
- Other political affiliations: Samyukta Socialist Party
- Spouse: Kantabai Shrangare
- Children: Usha Ughade, Rajeshwar Shrangare, Vijayalaxmi Payal, Neeta Dhende
- Education: Bachelor of Arts, LLB
- Alma mater: Nizam College Hyderabad, Milind College Aurangabad, M.P.Law College Aurangabad.
- Occupation: Politician, Lawyer

Tukaram Sadashiv Shrangare (20 May 1937 – 8 January 2011) was an Indian politician, a lawyer and social worker from Latur, Maharashtra. He was a former member of 6th Lok Sabha, lower house of Parliament of India. He was elected to the Lok Sabha on an Indian National Congress Party ticket in the 1977 general elections representing the Osmanabad (Lok Sabha constituency). He was a member of the Indian National Congress and originally belonged to Latur district in the Marathwada region of Maharashtra.

Shrangare served as Union Minister of State in the Ministry of Communications in the Charan Singh Ministry from July 1979 to January 1980.

== Early life and family ==
Shrangare was born in 1937 in the village of Nalegaon in the Latur district (Marathwada region) of the then princely state of Hyderabad, now Maharashtra, India. He attended the Nizam College, Hyderabad, to complete the Intermediate Studies. He then attended the Milind College earning a degree in Bachelor of Arts and then he got Bachelor of Laws (LLB) in Manikchand Pahade Law College, Aurangabad. He started his career as an advocate.

Shrangare married Kantabai (née Madale) and has 1 son and 3 daughters named Rajeshwar, Usha, Vijayalaxmi and Neeta.

== Professional life ==
Shrangare began to practice law at Latur, Maharashtra in 1964. He joined as a junior advocate to Shivraj Patil Chakurkar's office. In 1972, Shrangare became a Public Prosecutor at Latur District & Sessions Court. In 1974, Shrangare got elected as the President of Lawyers Bar Association, Latur.

== Political career ==
=== Early career ===
Shrangare was very active in social work since his early days as a lawyer such as giving free legal aid to poor, backward class people. He was member of various educational institutions.

Early in his career as a lawyer, as he was a person of socialist ideology he came in contact with some leaders of Samyukta Socialist Party (SSP). He joined the Samyukta Socialist Party and became a member under the leadership of S.M.Joshi. In 1971 general elections, Shrangare was nominated as the candidate of the Latur (Lok Sabha constituency) by the Samyukta Socialist Party. He lost this election to Indian National Congress Party candidate Tulshiram Kamble.

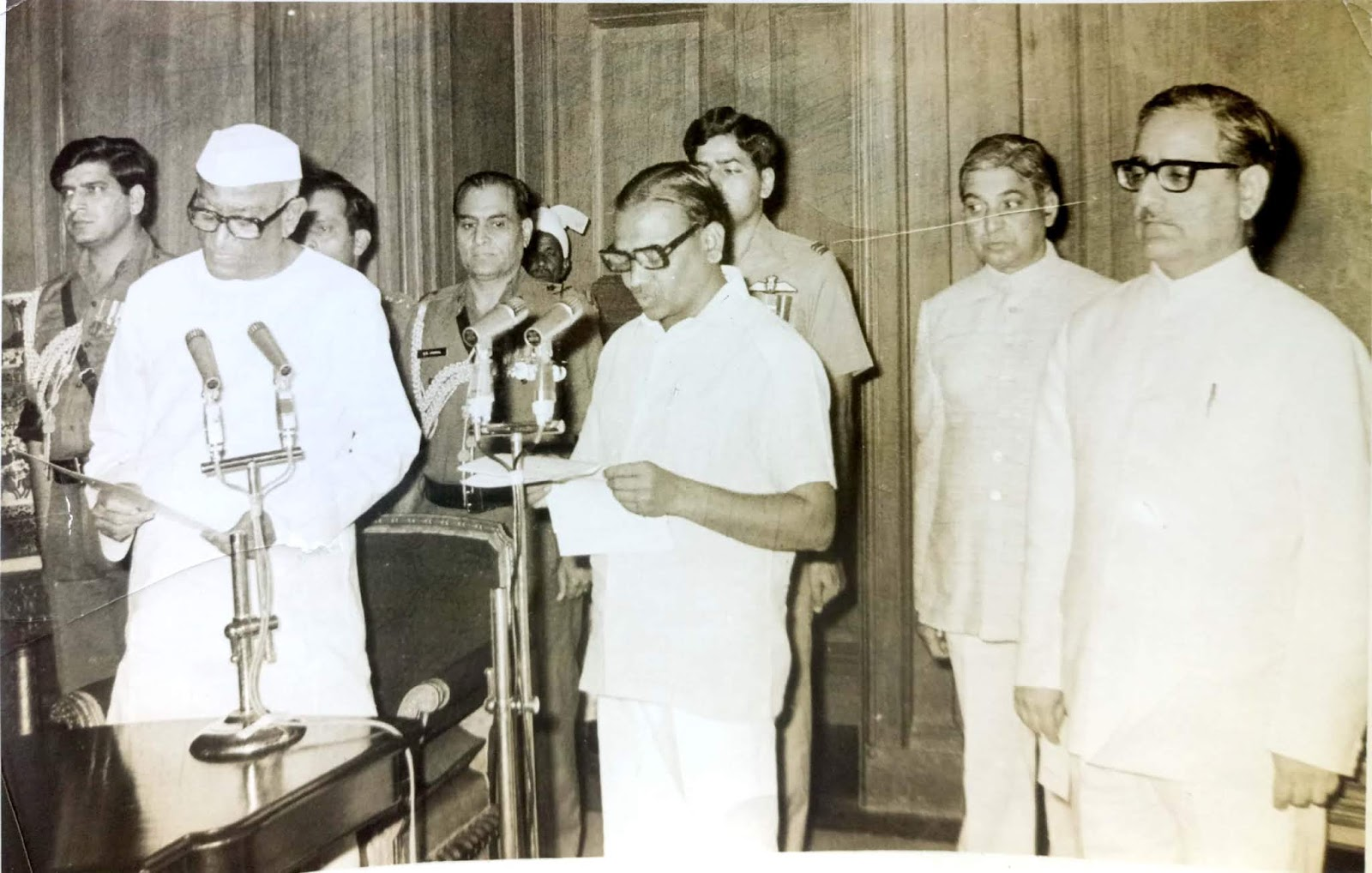
Shri Tukaram Shrangare swearing-in as the Union Minister of State in New Delhi in July, 1979

=== 1977-1980 ===
Again in 1977 general elections, Shrangare was offered a ticket for the Osmanabad (Lok Sabha constituency) by the Indian National Congress Party. He won this election by a margin of 61,544 votes. During his tenure as Member of Parliament, he came in close contact with senior congress leader Yashwantrao Chavan.

In July 1979, Charan Singh was sworn in as Prime Minister, with outside support by Indira Congress and Yashwantrao Chavan of Congress (Socialist) faction as his Deputy PM. In the Charan Singh Ministry, Shrangare was appointed to the council of ministers as a Minister of State in the Ministry of Communications. But as this was a short-lived cabinet, Shrangare's tenure as a Union Minister was also of a short period.

=== 1980-1990 ===
In 1980, Shrangare left the Congress (I) party and joined the Congress (U) party under the leadership of Sharad Pawar. He contested the 1980 general elections from the Osmanabad (Lok Sabha constituency) as a Congress (U) candidate but lost the elections to the Congress (I) candidate.

Shrangare was again nominated as a candidate for the 1984 general elections from the Osmanabad (Lok Sabha constituency) by the Congress (S) party. But again lost this election to Arvind Kamble of the Indian National Congress by a margin of 57,128 votes.

=== 1990-1996 ===
Later in 1994, Shrangare was elected as the Chairman of Marathwada Statutory Development Board (Marathwada Vikas Maha Mandal) and continued as the chairman for 5 consecutive years. During this term, Shrangare did numerous works for the development of Marathwada Region.

== Illness and death ==
In 2004, Shrangare suffered a paralysis stroke which made him immobile for the rest of his life. On 8 January 2011, he died due to prolonged illness.

Shrangare's cremation took place in Latur, Maharashtra with full state honours.

== Positions held ==
- Union Minister of State in the Ministry of Communications (India).
- National Advisor, AICC (All India Congress Committee).
- Vice President, MPCC (Maharashtra Pradesh Congress Committee).
- Chairman, Marathwada Statutory Development Board.
- President, Lawyers Bar Association, Latur.
