= Padamsinh Bajirao Patil =

Indian politician (born 1940)

Dr. Padmasinha Patil
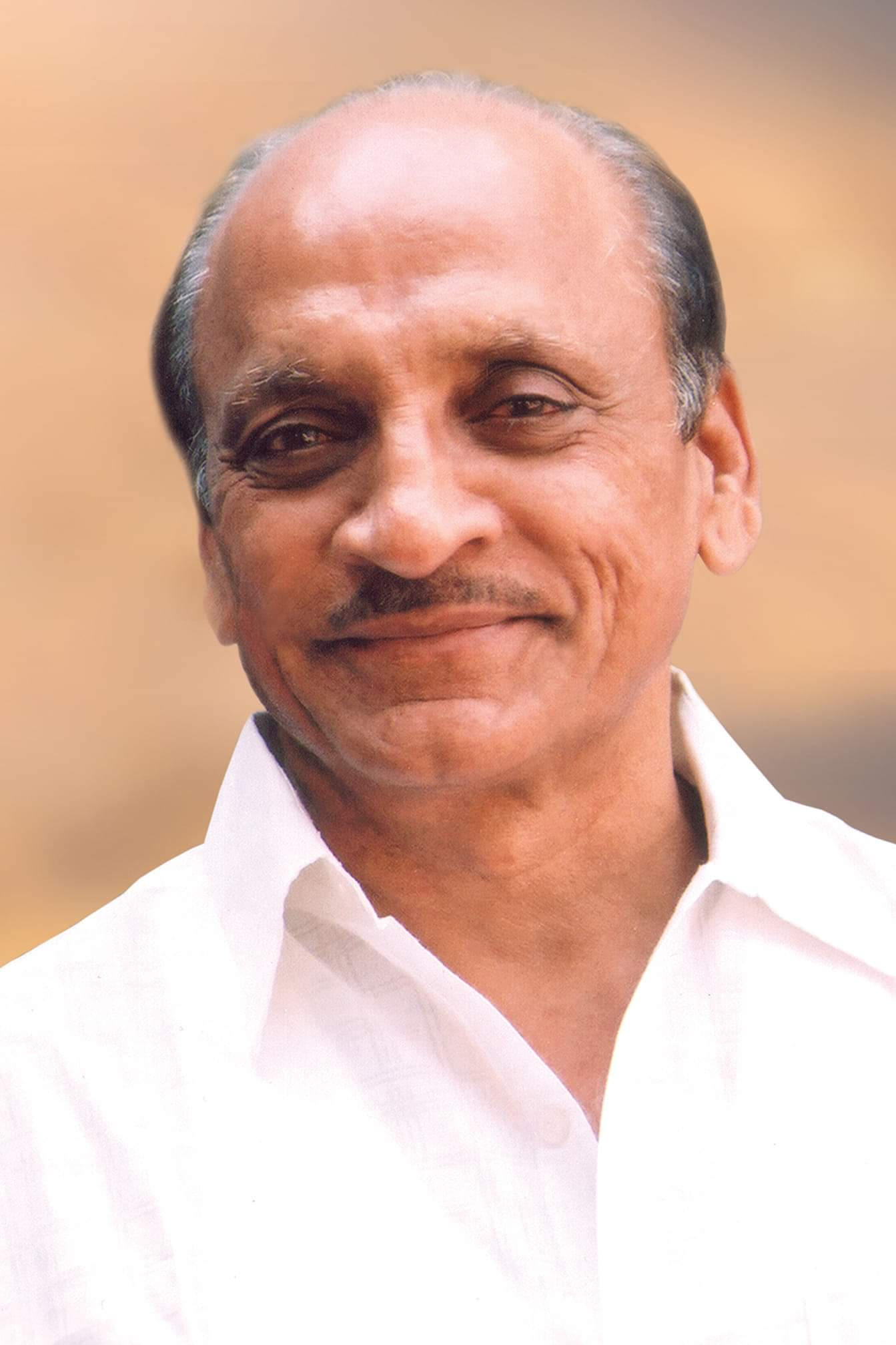

Home Minister of Maharashtra
- In office 1988–1994

Deputy Speaker of Maharashtra Legislative Assembly
- In office 1986–1988

Cabinet Minister for Water Resources
- In office 2002–2004

Cabinet Minister for Energy & Water Resources
- In office 1999–2002

Cabinet Minister for Energy and Excise
- In office 1978–1980

Member of Maharashtra Legislative Assembly
- In office 1978–2009
- Preceded by: Gautamrao Survase
- Succeeded by: Omprakash Raje Nimbalkar
- Constituency: Osmanabad

Member of Parliament, Lok Sabha
- In office 2009–2014
- Preceded by: Kalpana Ramesh Narhire
- Succeeded by: Ravindra Gaikwad
- Constituency: Osmanabad

Personal details
- Born: 1 June 1940 (age 86) Ter, Maharashtra, India
- Spouse: Chandrakala Patil
- Children: Ranajagjitsinha Patil; Prithviraj Patil
- Relatives: Sunetra Pawar (sister)
- Occupation: Politician

Dr. Padmasinha Bajirao Patil (born 1 June 1940) is a former Home Minister of Maharashtra and member of the 15th Lok Sabha.

His sister, Sunetra Pawar, is the deputy chief minister of Maharashtra, and the wife of Ajit Pawar, who had previously served the office.

Dr Patil was a minister in the Maharashtra State Government for more than 20 years.

He is a former deputy speaker of the Maharashtra Vidhan Sabha, Deputy Opposition Leader and also the State President of Sharad Pawar's Congress(S).

Dr Patil was elected to the Lok Sabha from Osmanabad Lok Sabha constituency on a Nationalist Congress Party ticket in the 2009 general elections.

He is a former member of the Maharashtra Legislative Assembly for 8 terms.

He was responsible for bringing Chhagan Bhujbal into the Nationalist Congress Party and creating other stalwart leaders in the party.

His son Ranajagjitsinha Patil is a former Minister of State for Industries, Revenue, Agriculture, Cultural Affairs, Protocol, Employment and Employment with guarantee scheme, Parliamentary Affairs and a Member of the Legislative Council for two terms; he has now been elected as a Member of the Legislative Assembly for Osmanabad Assembly constituency.

Dr Patil is the founding President and Chairman of the Terna Public Charitable Trust, headquartered in Dharashiv.

== Positions held ==
- 1975-1978 Chairman Building and Construction ("B&C") Committee Zilla Parishad ("Z.P.") Osmanabad
- 1975-1978 Member Zilla Parishad Osmanabad
- 1978-2009 Member of the Maharashtra Legislative Assembly ("MLA")
- 1978–1980 Cabinet Minister for Energy & Excise, Government of Maharashtra
- 1986–1988 Deputy Speaker, Maharashtra Legislative Assembly
- 1988–1994 Cabinet Minister for Irrigation, Home Affairs & Ex. Services Welfare, Government of Maharashtra
- 1995-1999 Deputy Leader of the Opposition, Government of Maharashtra
- 1999–2002 Cabinet Minister for Energy and Water Resources, Government of Maharashtra
- 2002–2004 Cabinet Minister for Water Resources (excluding Krishna Valley Irrigation), Government of Maharashtra
- 2009 Elected to the 15th Lok Sabha, Government of India
- 2009 - 2014 Member of Parliament, Government of India

== Criminal charge ==
In 2009, Patil was charged by the Central Bureau of Investigation (CBI) in connection with the 2006 murder of his cousin, Congress leader Pawanraje Nimbalkar, and his driver, Samad Kazi, who were shot dead near Kalamboli in Navi Mumbai on 3 June 2006.

On 20 June 2026, a Special CBI Court in Mumbai acquitted Patil and seven other accused, holding that the prosecution had failed to prove the charges beyond reasonable doubt.
