= Sastur =

Village in Maharashtra

- village
- Location in Maharashtra, India Sastur (India)
- Coordinates: 17°59′56″N 076°30′03″E
- Country: India
- State: Maharashtra
- District: Osmanabad
- Tahsil: Lohara

Government
  - Body: Village panchayat
  - Sarpanch: Y M Kasar

Population (2011)
  - Total: 7,259

Languages
  - Official: Marathi
- Time zone: UTC+5:30 (IST)
- Lok Sabha constituency: Osmanabad
- Vidhan Sabha constituency: Umarga

Sastur is a panchayat village in the state of Maharashtra, India. Administratively, Sastur is under Lohara Tehsil of Osmanabad District in Maharashtra. There is only the single village of Sastur in the Sastur gram panchayat. The village of Sastur is 20 km by road northwest of the village of Madaj and 22 km by road east of the village of Lohara Bk.

== Demographics ==
In the 2001 census, the village of Sastur had 6,612 inhabitants, with 3,386 males (51.2%) and 3,226 females (48.8%), for a gender ratio of 953 females per thousand males.

In the 2011 census, the village of Sastur had 7,259 inhabitants.
