= Lohara Bk. =

Village in Maharashtra

Lohara Bk. Lohara
- village
- Location in Maharashtra, India Lohara Bk. (India)
- Coordinates: 17°59′20″N 076°19′22″E
- Country: India
- State: Maharashtra
- District: Osmanabad
- Tahsil: Lohara

Government
  - Body: Nagar panchayat

Population (2011)
  - Total: 8,661

Languages
  - Official: Marathi
- Time zone: UTC+5:30 (IST)
- PIN: 413608
- Telephone code: 02475
- ISO 3166 code: IN-MH
- Lok Sabha constituency: Osmanabad
- Vidhan Sabha constituency: Umarga
- Website: maharashtra.gov.in

Lohara Bk. is a Nagar Panchayat town in the state of Maharashtra, India. Lohara Bk. is headquarters for and administratively under Lohara Tehsil of Osmanabad District in Maharashtra. There is only the single town of Lohara Bk. in the Lohara Bk. Nagar panchayat. The village of Lohara Bk. is 22 km by road west of the village of Sastur and 33 km by road east of the town of Tuljapur.

== Demographics ==
In the 2001 census, the village of Lohara Bk. had 7,479 inhabitants, with 3,822 males (51.1%) and 3,657 females (48.9%), for a gender ratio of 957 females per thousand males.

In the 2011 census, the village of Lohara Bk. had 7,023 inhabitants.
