= Tulsiram Patil =

Indian politician (1917–2007)

Member of Parliament, Lok Sabha
- In office 1962–1977
- Preceded by: Venkatrao Naldurgker
- Succeeded by: Tukaram Shrangare
- Constituency: Osmanabad

Personal details
- Born: September 1917
- Died: 19 November 2007 (aged 90) Latur, Maharashtra, India
- Party: Indian National Congress
- Spouse: Sitabai

Tulsiram Abaji Patil (September 1917 – 19 November 2007) was an Indian politician. He was elected to the Lok Sabha, the lower house of the Parliament of India as a member of the Indian National Congress.

Patil died in Latur, Maharashtra on 19 November 2007, at the age of 90.
