= Fakirpasha Mahebub Shahajinde =

Indian Marathi-language poet (born 1946)

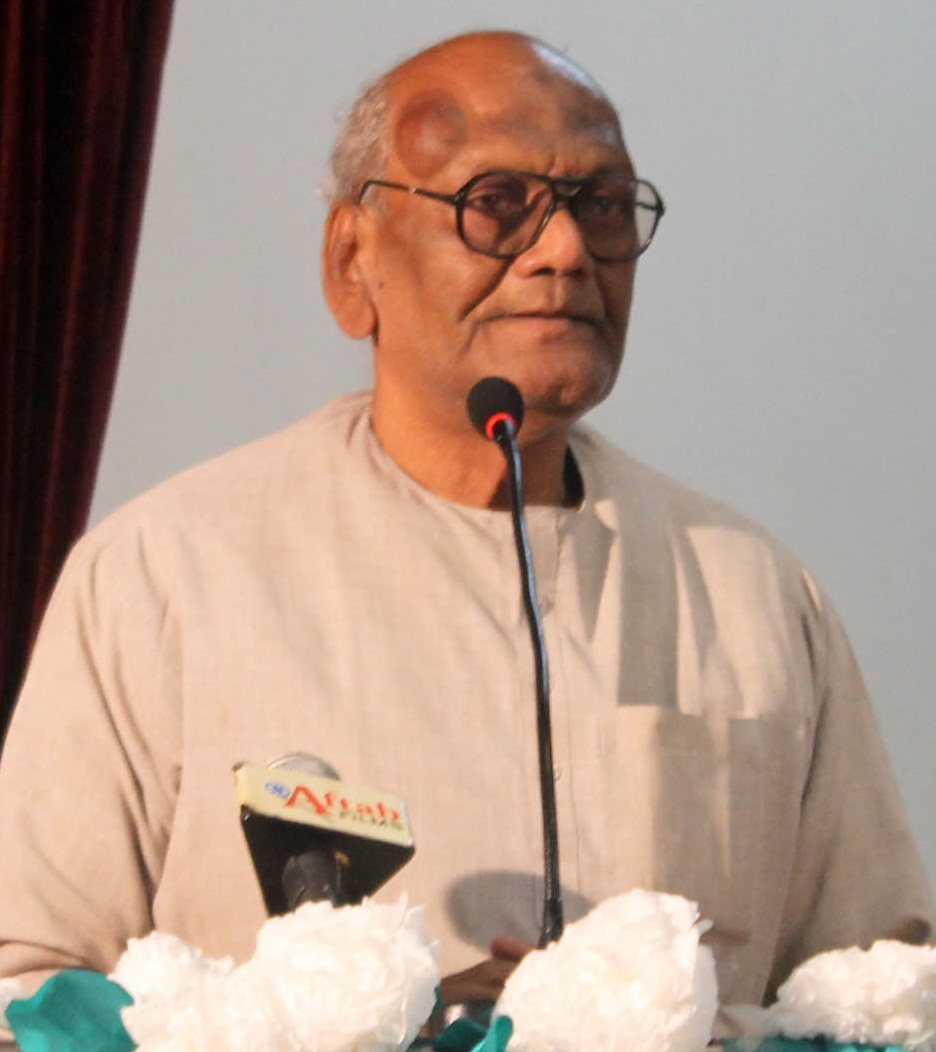
- Born: 3 July 1946 (age 78); Sastur village, Osmanabad district, Maharashtra, India
- Occupation: Writer, poet

Fakirpasha Mahebub Shahajinde (born 3 July 1946), known commonly as Fa Ma Shahajinde, is a poet from Maharashtra, India. The Marathwadi language remains an important core of his literature.

== Personal life ==
Shahajinde born on 3 July 1946 in Sastur village of Osmanabad district, Maharashtra to a Hindu father and a Muslim Kolhati mother. His father died in a communal riot that broke out during the Annexation of Hyderabad. After the Razakars staged an armed uprising, many rebels against the Nizam government were killed, which was followed by a communal Hindu riot in retaliation. A Hindu family protected his mother and other relatives.

He earned his B.A. from the Maulana Azad College of Arts and Science in Aurangabad and M.A. in Marathi from the Marathwada University in 1970.

== Career ==
Shahajinde began his career as the professor of Marathi language at Master Deenanath Mangeshkar College in Aurad Shahajani (near Nilanga). In 2006, he retired as the head of the department of Marathi.

As much as his poems are searching for a new place, they are also establishing a new place. The rebellion expressed in Shahajinde's poetry is not violent, but challenging this system with the self-sufficiency of existence and the meaningful confidence given by the soil here. Shahajinde's poems in Nidharmi (निधर्मी) and Adam (आदम) collections challenge the system that has made life difficult for the Muslims here and its history and present.

=== Bhumi Prakashan ===
Shahajinde was instrumental in publishing the literature of many local poets and writers in Marathwada through his publishing house, Bhumi Prakashan Sanstha. It was established in 2000 on a cooperative basis.

Marathi saint literature was a focus area and the press published more than 100 works of Yusufkhan Mohamadkhan Pathan, Fakhruddin Bennoor, Janardan Waghmare, Suryanarayan Ransubhe, Rajekhan Shanediwan, and Shripal Sabnis. Bhumi Prakashana has also published the selected literature of Javed Qureshi and Lalita Gadge.

=== Muslim Marathi Literature movement ===
He has played an important role in the Muslim Marathi Literature movement established in the 1990s. He was the President of the first All India Muslim Marathi Literary Conference held at Solapur in March 1990. Shahajinde has published a total of 17 books so far.
