= Omprakash Raje Nimbalkar =

Indian politician

Omraje Nimbalkar

Member of Parliament, Lok Sabha
- Incumbent
- Assumed office May 2019
- Preceded by: Ravindra Gaikwad
- Constituency: Osmanabad

Member of Maharashtra Legislative Assembly
- In office 2009–2014
- Preceded by: Padmasinh Patil
- Succeeded by: Ranajagjitsinha Patil
- Constituency: Osmanabad

Personal details
- Born: 17 July 1983 (age 43) Govardhanwadi, Osmanabad District, Maharashtra
- Party: Shiv Sena (June 2026-Present), (until 2022)
- Other political affiliations: Shiv Sena (2022-2026)
- Spouse: Sanyojani Deshmukh (m. 2011)
- Relations: Padmasinh Patil (paternal uncle)
- Occupation: Politician

Omprakash Raje Nimbalkar is an Indian politician representing Shiv Sena from Osmanabad district, Maharashtra. He was a member of the 17th Lok Sabha from Osmanabad constituency. He was previously a member of the Maharashtra Legislative Assembly from Osmanabad Assembly constituency. He is the cousin of Ranajagjitsinha Patil and his paternal uncle is Padamsinh Bajirao Patil.

== Positions held ==
- 2009: Elected to Maharashtra Legislative Assembly
- 2019: Elected to 17th Lok Sabha
- 2024: Elected to 18th Lok Sabha

== See also ==
- Osmanabad Taluka
