= Avakinnayo Karakandu =

- Aridusaha Modana Modusahau, Pinnasiya Ariyana Jivayena, Chakravartti
- Predecessor: Dantavakhra (King of Kalinga)
- Successor: Vasupala (Karakandu's Son)
- Spouse: Madanavali (Princess of Saurashtra), Kanakprabha, Anangalekha, Chandralekha, Kusumavah, etc.
- Father: Dadhivahana (King of Anga)
- Mother: Padmavati (Princess of Kosambi)
- Religion: Jainism

Avakinnayo Karakandu or Karakanda (Odia: ଅବକିଣ୍ଣୟୋ କରକଣ୍ଡ) was a powerful legendary Jain emperor of Kalinga (Odisha and North Andhra), who is said to have lived in around 9th century BCE.

He is a celebrated hero of many Jain and Buddhist religious scriptures. Ancient Buddhist text of Kumbhakara Jataka mentions him to be the Pratyekabuddha or the enlightened living being. Karakandu was a great devotee of the 23rd Jain Tirthankara Parshvanatha who preached Jainism in Kalinga around 850 B.C.

Karakandu is also referred to as the "Bull among Kings" by Mahavira, the 24th Jain tirthankar. Successive Jain chroniclers over the years have placed him in the group of four Chakravati kings of the Indian subcontinent during his time who also were considered as prateykabudhhas namely, Nagnajit of Gandhara, Nemi or Nimi of Videha, Durmukha or Dwimukha of Panchala and Karakandu of Kalinga. After achieving victory over many kings and ruling for a long term, Karakandu became a Jain Sramana and left the throne and kingdom in charge of his son. During his time Kalinga was a Jain stronghold often described as the Kalinga Jinasana which may be compared to the later era Buddhist Janapadas. It was Jain monk Kanakmara's work in Apabrhamasa or Prakrit language known as Karakandu Cariu which gives detailed events about his life.

== As described in successive Buddhist and Jain ancient literature ==
Both the followers of Buddhism and Jainism have written successive literature about Karakandu till the early 16th century AD. The languages like Prakrit, Pali and Sanskrit were used to create the literal works about him. The literature works about his life are,

- Karakanda Cariu by Jain monk Kanakmara (Digambara Jain sect)
- Majjimanikaya (Buddhist)
- Kumbhakara Jataka (Buddhist)
- Uttaradhyayana Sutra by Devendra (Swetambara Jain sect)
- Sisyahita commentary by Santisuri (Swetambara Jain sect)
- Kathakosa by Subhasilagani (Swetambara Jain sect)
- Apabhramsa or Prakrit Language story of Karakandu by Sricandra (Digambara Jain sect)
- Karakanda Caritra by Subhacandra and Sakalbhusana (Digambara Jain sect)
- Karakanda Caritra by Rayadhu in Prakit Language
- Punyasravana Kathakosa by Ramacandra in Sanskrit Language

== Life as narrated in literature ==
Jain Monk Kanakmara's creation "Karakanda Cariu" is the most complete work on the life of Karakandu. Karakandu is depicted as a brave and heroic king who has championed different subjects and skills. He is mentioned in the poems as "Pinnasiya-ariyana-jivayena" meaning destroyer of the lives of the foes and "Aridusaha-modana-modusahau" meaning vanquisher of the irresistible enemies by twisting their bodies in frontal battles. He made his sceptre, royal umbrella and elephant goad from the wild bamboo sticks that grew out of the eye sockets of dead man's skull lying in his crematorium on the advice of Jain sramanas Yasobhadra and Virabhadra, after sitting on the throne of Kalinga. Though there are mythical angles induced in this work of literature, the historicity of the character is substantiated by multiple follow up works by believers from both Buddhism and Jainism.

=== Early life ===
Karakandu was the son of King Dadhivahana and Queen Padmavati of Anga kingdom. As recorded in the literature, Padmavati wished to ride an elephant with her husband while being Pregnant with Karakandu. Due to some reasons the elephant became agitated and ran into the forests uncontrollably. The king saved himself while the queen became unconscious and later found herself in a deserted and dry cremation ground. The queen was first rescued by a Brhamin but his wife later expelled her from the house being jealous of her beauty. The queen took refuge in the crematorium and gave birth to Karakandu with a dry scab in his hand. Matanga Baladeva, a Vidyadhara or wisdom holder from a state by the Vijayardha close to Kalinga persuaded the queen that the child is destined to become the king of Kalinga one day and should be left with him to be trained for this purpose. Due to the scab wound in the baby's hand Baladeva named him Karakanda. He learned all the arts and sciences to gain knowledge under the guidance of the Matanga Baladeva. Brhamins used to call him Avakinnayo which meant low born outcast since his birth who dwelled at the crematorium. Queen Padmavati left the place and went on to become a nun under the sage Samadhigupta.

After some years the king of Kalinga by the name Dantavakra died without any heir to the throne. Undergoing some ritual tests, Karakandu was chosen as the king. He married the princess Madanavali, the daughter of the king of Girinagara known as Ajayvarma.

=== Seize on Champa ===
According to the narration in the literature, the king Dadhivahana of Champa city (capital of Anga) or the real father of Karakandu demanded him to pay homages being unaware that he was his son. Karakandu enraged with this act led a seize on Champa by crossing the river Ganga. Mythical angles used in the narration of the texts exaggerate the scene of the battle between both father and son. Karakandu was almost defeated in the battle but due to the use of knowledge provided to him by the Vindyadhara and his foster father Matanga Baladeva, he was able to turn the tide of the battle. According to the narrations it is said that the mother of Karakandu who had by now turned a nun intervened in some manner and introduced both father and son to each other. Realizing that Karakandu was his son, Dadhivahana crowned him as the king of Champa.

=== Military expedition on Southern India ===
After becoming the king, Karakandu sent out emissaries expecting homages and taxes to him from the Chola, Chera and Pandyan kings in the south. The southern kings denied to comply. Karakandu marched with a huge army to subjugate the southern kings as they didn't accept his suzerainty. He camped at Terapura or Dharashiv in the modern Osmanabad district of Maharastra. Here the king of the Asmaka region by the name Shiva welcomed him to his territory by paying him a visit and Karakandu learned about the spiritual importance of the place and the mountains as a Jain shrine. Following some folklore of the time he excavated the Dharashiv caves and also build some new caves there for meditation by Jain monks. Karakandu landed on Simhala island with his army and the king accepting his suzerainty invited him to his palace and married off his daughter, the princess Rativega to him.

Marriages of Karakandu

The narrations also say that while returning from his expedition in south with the princess of Lanka, he protected a Vidyadhara by killing his enemies and then married his daughter Kanakprabha. He is also said to have married other women from the Vidyadhara community like Anangalekha, Chandralekha, Kusumavah along with seven hundred women.

Karakandu invaded the territories of the Cholas, Cheras and Pandyas and defeated them. The rulers of these dynasties were taken prisoners and presented before him. Soon he realized that the kings were devotees of the Jain tirthankars as the kings had their carved idols or symbols in their crowns. He forgives them and lets them to independently rule as his vassals in the south.

== Becoming a Jain Sramana ==
Karakandu was counseled by the sage Silagupta at his second capital Champa about the truth of material life and the religious principles. Disgusted with the way life functions in the material premises, he abdicated his throne for his son Vasupala and left the kingdom to become a monk. The mother of Karakandu, Padmavati is also described to have attained heaven during this phase of counseling by Silagupta.

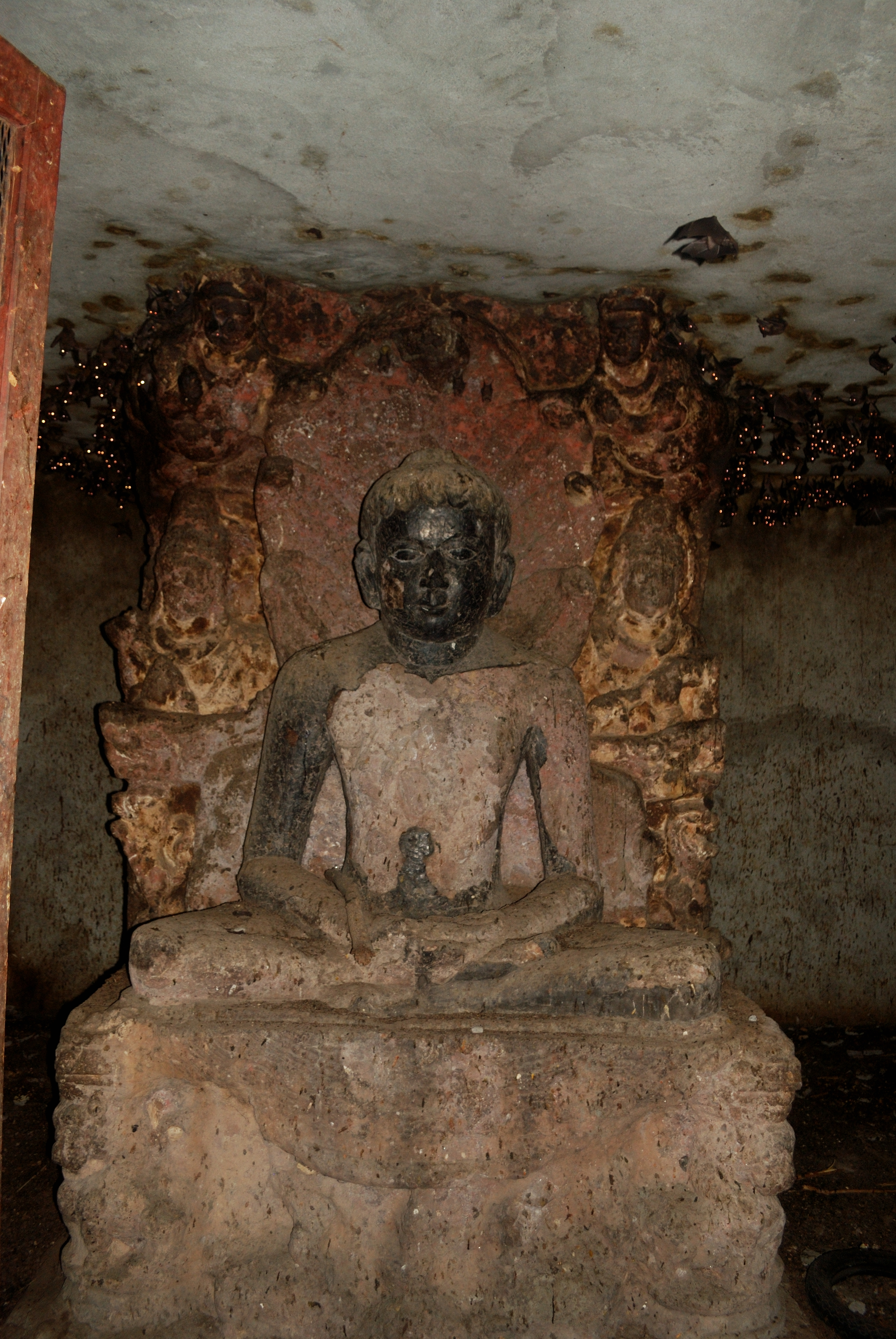
Parshvanath in Dharashiv caves

According to Kanakmara, Karakanda had very strong faith in the teachings by greatest Jain philosophers of his era. He strictly followed the Anuvratas and Gunavratas principles of Jainism, which are applicable for both monks and household people according to Jainism. Since most of the literary works about Karakandu are written with mythical and magical angles to the realistic events of his time, the historicity behind his existence is proven due to the repeated efforts to keep him alive through literature by both Buddhists and Jains along with the present existence of Dharashiv caves in Maharashtra which he had excavated and renovated once in his lifetime.
