= Tulsiram Kamble =

Indian politician (born 1922)

Member of Parliament, Lok Sabha
- In office 1962–1977
- Succeeded by: Udhavrao Patil
- Constituency: Latur

Personal details
- Born: 8 March 1922 Chakur, Osmanabad district, British India
- Party: Indian National Congress
- Spouse: Kalawati
- Children: Arvind Kamble

Tulsiram Dashrath Kamble (born 8 March 1922) is an Indian politician. He was elected to the Lok Sabha, the lower house of the Parliament of India as a member of the Indian National Congress.
