= Tuljapur Assembly constituency =

Coordinates: 18.01°N 76.07°E

Tuljapur
- Constituency No. 241 for the Maharashtra Legislative Assembly
- Ranajagjit Sinha, present MLA of Tuljapur

Constituency details
- Country: India
- Region: Western India
- State: Maharashtra
- District: Osmanabad
- Lok Sabha constituency: Osmanabad
- Established: 1957
- Total electors: 383,672
- Reservation: None

Member of Legislative Assembly
- 15th Maharashtra Legislative Assembly
- Incumbent Ranajagjitsinha Patil
- Party: BJP
- Elected year: 2024

Tuljapur Assembly constituency is one of the Maharashtra Vidhan Sabha (legislative assembly) constituencies, in Maharashtra state in western India.

== Overview ==
Tuljapur (constituency number 241) is one of the four Vidhan Sabha constituencies located in Osmanabad district. It covers the entire Tuljapur tehsil and part of the Osmanabad tehsil of this district. The number of electors in 2009 was 298,290 (male 159,017, female 139,273).

Tuljapur is part of Osmanabad Lok Sabha constituency along with five other Vidhan Sabha constituencies, namely Paranda, Umarga and Osmanabad in Osmanabad district, Barshi in the Solapur district and Ausa in Latur district.

== Members of the Legislative Assembly ==
Year	Member	Party
1957	Sahebrao Dada Hangargekar	Indian National Congress
1962	Sahebrao Dada Hangargekar	Indian National Congress
1967	Shivajirao Shahajirao Patil (Babhalgaonkar)	Indian National Congress
1972	Shivajirao Shahajirao Patil (Babhalgaonkar)	Indian National Congress
1978	Manikrao Khapale	Peasants and Workers Party
1980	Sidramappa Alure	Indian National Congress (I)
1985	Manikrao Khapale	Peasants and Workers Party
1990	Madhukarrao Chavan	Indian National Congress
1995	Manikrao Khapale	Peasants and Workers Party
1999	Madhukarrao Chavan	Indian National Congress
2004	Madhukarrao Chavan	Indian National Congress
2009	Madhukarrao Chavan	Indian National Congress
2014	Madhukarrao Chavan	Indian National Congress
2019	Ranajagjitsinha Patil	Bharatiya Janata Party
2024	Ranajagjitsinha Patil	Bharatiya Janata Party

== Election results ==
=== Assembly Election 2024 ===
2024 Maharashtra Legislative Assembly election : Tuljapur
Party	Candidate	Votes	%	±%
BJP	Ranajagjitsinha Padmasinha Patil	131,863	50.97%	▲7.47
INC	Kuldeep Dhiraj Appasaheb Kadam Patil	94,984	36.71%	▲3.39
SP	Rochkari Devanand Sahebrao	16,335	6.31%	New
VBA	Dr. Sneha Apparao Sonkate	7,908	3.06%	▼12.48
NOTA	None of the Above	769	0.30%	▼0.12
Margin of victory		36,879	14.25%	▲4.08
Turnout		259,489	67.63%	▲2.75
Total valid votes		258,720		
Registered electors		383,672		▲8.86
BJP hold		Swing	▲7.47	

=== Assembly Election 2019 ===
2019 Maharashtra Legislative Assembly election : Tuljapur
Party	Candidate	Votes	%	±%
BJP	Ranajagjitsinha Padmasinha Patil	99,034	43.50%	▲26.66
INC	Madhukarao Deorao Chavan	75,865	33.32%	▲0.60
VBA	Ashok Haridas Jagdale	35,383	15.54%	New
PHJSP	Mahendra (Kaka) Dhurgude	7,458	3.28%	New
Independent	Mahanandha Rajendra Dudhbhate	1,460	0.64%	New
MNS	Navgire Prashant Prakash	1,431	0.63%	▼15.98
NOTA	None of the Above	960	0.42%	▼0.19
Margin of victory		23,169	10.18%	▼3.53
Turnout		228,662	64.88%	▼0.35
Total valid votes		227,688		
Registered electors		352,449		▲6.38
BJP gain from INC		Swing	▲10.78	

=== Assembly Election 2014 ===
2014 Maharashtra Legislative Assembly election : Tuljapur
Party	Candidate	Votes	%	±%
INC	Madhukarao Deorao Chavan	70,701	32.72%	▼0.79
NCP	Gore Jeevanrao Vishwanathrao	41,091	19.02%	New
BJP	Nimbalkar Sanjay Prakash	36,380	16.84%	▼8.35
MNS	Devanand Sahebrao Rochkari	35,895	16.61%	New
SS	Patil Sudhir Keshavrao	24,991	11.56%	New
BSP	Dornalikar Premanand Balwantrao	2,405	1.11%	New
NOTA	None of the Above	1,314	0.61%	New
Margin of victory		29,610	13.70%	▲5.39
Turnout		217,414	65.62%	▼0.62
Total valid votes		216,094		
Registered electors		331,310		▲11.07
INC hold		Swing	▼0.79	

=== Assembly Election 2009 ===
2009 Maharashtra Legislative Assembly election : Tuljapur
Party	Candidate	Votes	%	±%
INC	Madhukarao Deorao Chavan	65,802	33.51%	▼1.59
BJP	Subhash Sureshchandra Deshmukh	49,469	25.19%	New
PWPI	Devanand Sahebrao Rochkari	45,942	23.39%	▲22.29
Independent	Arvind Janardhan Gore	15,665	7.98%	New
Independent	Arjun Sidram Salgar	4,999	2.55%	New
Independent	Pathan Mainoddin Mohmmad Khaja	2,530	1.29%	New
Independent	Prakash Changdev Hangarkar	2,095	1.07%	New
Margin of victory		16,333	8.32%	▲5.36
Turnout		196,565	65.90%	▼5.32
Total valid votes		196,393		
Registered electors		298,290		▲81.91
INC hold		Swing	▼1.59	

=== Assembly Election 2004 ===
2004 Maharashtra Legislative Assembly election : Tuljapur
Party	Candidate	Votes	%	±%
INC	Madhukarao Deorao Chavan	40,958	35.10%	▲3.38
SP	Devanand Sahebrao Rochkari	37,513	32.15%	New
SS	Borgaonkar Narendra Baburao	28,879	24.75%	▲13.41
JSS	Kharade Sidramappa Ganapatrao	3,574	3.06%	New
Independent	Rokade Milind Somnath	2,438	2.09%	New
BSP	Hangargekar Suhas Mohanrao	2,039	1.75%	New
PWPI	Shinde Kakasaheb Shankar	1,292	1.11%	▼7.34
Margin of victory		3,445	2.95%	▼1.03
Turnout		116,870	71.27%	▲6.68
Total valid votes		116,693		
Registered electors		163,981		▲11.24
INC hold		Swing	▲3.38	

=== Assembly Election 1999 ===
1999 Maharashtra Legislative Assembly election : Tuljapur
Party	Candidate	Votes	%	±%
INC	Madhukarao Deorao Chavan	30,151	31.72%	▼1.28
NCP	Borgaonkar Narendra Baburao	26,364	27.74%	New
Independent	Rochkari Devanand Sahebrao	16,079	16.92%	New
SS	Vadne Shamal Kedari	10,773	11.33%	▲4.25
PWPI	Khaple Manikrao Bhimrao	8,033	8.45%	▼48.91
Independent	Pailwan Rajesh Prataprao	1,856	1.95%	New
Independent	Mallkunaik Malku Limbaji	847	0.89%	New
Margin of victory		3,787	3.98%	▼20.37
Turnout		101,371	68.77%	▼9.11
Total valid votes		95,053		
Registered electors		147,406		▼0.33
INC gain from PWPI		Swing	▼25.64	

=== Assembly Election 1995 ===
1995 Maharashtra Legislative Assembly election : Tuljapur
Party	Candidate	Votes	%	±%
PWPI	Khaple Manikrao Bhimrao	62,437	57.36%	▲21.88
INC	Madhukarao Deorao Chavan	35,924	33.00%	▼19.45
SS	Kadam Sudhir Kisanrao	7,707	7.08%	▼0.59
BBM	Narote Mahadeo Gena	1,440	1.32%	New
Margin of victory		26,513	24.36%	▲7.38
Turnout		111,435	75.34%	▲6.29
Total valid votes		108,850		
Registered electors		147,901		▲10.00
PWPI gain from INC		Swing	▲4.90	

=== Assembly Election 1990 ===
1990 Maharashtra Legislative Assembly election : Tuljapur
Party	Candidate	Votes	%	±%
INC	Madhukarao Deorao Chavan	47,474	52.46%	▲10.74
PWPI	Khaple Manikrao Bhimrao	32,108	35.48%	▼21.19
SS	Kadam Anantrao Shahajirao	6,938	7.67%	New
Independent	Amrutrao Annasaheb Dagdoba	1,486	1.64%	New
Independent	Suryakant Goroba Dande	1,235	1.36%	New
Margin of victory		15,366	16.98%	▲2.02
Turnout		92,338	68.67%	▼3.27
Total valid votes		90,501		
Registered electors		134,458		▲26.39
INC gain from PWPI		Swing	▼4.21	

=== Assembly Election 1985 ===
1985 Maharashtra Legislative Assembly election : Tuljapur
Party	Candidate	Votes	%	±%
PWPI	Khaple Manikrao Bhimrao	42,553	56.67%	▲25.25
INC	Alure Sidramappa Nagappa	31,323	41.72%	New
Independent	Sonkamble Sadashiv Chokhaji	624	0.83%	New
Independent	Balchandra Biru Vaidya	588	0.78%	New
Margin of victory		11,230	14.96%	▼8.49
Turnout		76,789	72.18%	▲5.41
Total valid votes		75,088		
Registered electors		106,387		▲11.49
PWPI gain from INC(I)		Swing	▲1.80	

=== Assembly Election 1980 ===
1980 Maharashtra Legislative Assembly election : Tuljapur
Party	Candidate	Votes	%	±%
INC(I)	Alure Sidramappa Nagappa	34,121	54.87%	New
PWPI	Khaple Manikrao Bhimrao	19,542	31.42%	▼16.04
INC(U)	Hangargekar Sahebrao Dadarao	5,678	9.13%	New
Independent	Khatib Syed Tanvir Syed Ali	1,687	2.71%	New
BJP	Jagadale Sudhir Ambadadsrao	1,159	1.86%	New
Margin of victory		14,579	23.44%	▲6.14
Turnout		63,633	66.68%	▼3.57
Total valid votes		62,187		
Registered electors		95,425		▲9.48
INC(I) gain from PWPI		Swing	▲7.41	

=== Assembly Election 1978 ===
1978 Maharashtra Legislative Assembly election : Tuljapur
Party	Candidate	Votes	%	±%
PWPI	Khaple Manikrao Bhimrao	28,438	47.46%	▲21.06
INC	Patil Shivajirao Shahajirao ( Babhalgaonkar )	18,072	30.16%	▼39.70
Independent	Alure Sidramappa Nagappa	11,999	20.03%	New
Independent	Shrigiri Laxman Naganath	875	1.46%	New
Independent	Birajdar Sidram Shivappa	534	0.89%	New
Margin of victory		10,366	17.30%	▼26.16
Turnout		61,585	70.65%	▲19.87
Total valid votes		59,918		
Registered electors		87,164		▼10.03
PWPI gain from INC		Swing	▼22.40	

=== Assembly Election 1972 ===
1972 Maharashtra Legislative Assembly election : Tuljapur
Party	Candidate	Votes	%	±%
INC	Shivajirao Patil	33,077	69.86%	▲30.11
PWPI	M. A. K. Mohammed Isakhan	12,499	26.40%	▲11.32
Independent	Shinde Ramchandra Genuji	1,772	3.74%	New
Margin of victory		20,578	43.46%	▲39.23
Turnout		49,096	50.68%	▼9.36
Total valid votes		47,348		
Registered electors		96,878		▲12.10
INC hold		Swing	▲30.11	

=== Assembly Election 1967 ===
1967 Maharashtra Legislative Assembly election : Tuljapur
Party	Candidate	Votes	%	±%
INC	Shivajirao Patil	20,001	39.75%	▼14.1
Independent	P. S. Shinde	17,870	35.51%	New
PWPI	M. B. Khaple	7,587	15.08%	▼26.2
SWA	D. S. Deshmukh	4,865	9.67%	New
Margin of victory		2,131	4.23%	▼8.34
Turnout		54,798	63.41%	▲13.12
Total valid votes		50,323		
Registered electors		86,419		▲4.47
INC hold		Swing	▼14.10	

=== Assembly Election 1962 ===
1962 Maharashtra Legislative Assembly election : Tuljapur
Party	Candidate	Votes	%	±%
INC	Sahebrao Dada	20,095	53.85%	▼10.55
PWPI	Devidas Nagoba pailwan	15,404	41.28%	▲5.68
PSP	Krishnathrao Ambadasrao	1,819	4.87%	New
Margin of victory		4,691	12.57%	▼16.23
Turnout		40,485	48.94%	▼15.49
Total valid votes		37,318		
Registered electors		82,725		▲58.94
INC hold		Swing	▼10.55	

=== Assembly Election 1957 ===
1957 Bombay State Legislative Assembly election : Tuljapur
Party	Candidate	Votes	%	±%
INC	Sahebrao Dada	20,313	64.40%	New
PWPI	Narsingrao Balbhimrao	11,230	35.60%	New
Margin of victory		9,083	28.80%	
Turnout		31,543	60.60%	
Total valid votes		31,543		
Registered electors		52,048		
INC win (new seat)				

== See also ==
- List of constituencies of Maharashtra Vidhan Sabha
- Tuljapur
