= Yashwantrao Chavan Maharashtra Open University =

State open university in Maharashtra, India

Coordinates: 20°1′14.01″N 73°41′27.74″E

- Motto: ज्ञानगंगा घरोघरी
- Type: Public
- Established: 1989; 37 years ago
- Affiliations: UGC
- Chancellor: Governor of Maharashtra
- Vice-Chancellor: Dr. Sanjeev Sonawane
- Location: Nashik, Maharashtra, India
- Campus: Urban
- Website: ycmou.digitaluniversity.ac

Yashwantrao Chavan Maharashtra Open University (YCMOU) is a state, open university, located in Nashik, Maharashtra, India. It was established on July 1, 1989 under the Yashwantrao Chavan Maharashtra Open University Act, 1989.

== Academic schools ==
All academic programs and students registration official academic website

1. School of Agricultural Science
2. School of Architecture, Science and Technology
3. School of Commerce and Management
4. School of Computer Science
5. School of Continuing Education
6. School of Education
7. School of Health Science
8. School of Humanities and Social Sciences
9. School of Multidisciplinary Studies
10. School of Vocational Education & Skills Development
11. Certification in Foreign Languages

== Notable alumni ==
Following are the notable alumni of, who is graduated from YCMOU University

- Lalita Babar - Rio2016 Summer Olympic Qualified Athlete
- Basavraj Madhavrao Patil - Member of the 13th Maharashtra Legislative Assembly
- Eknath Shinde - 10th Deputy Chief Minister of Maharashtra
- Kavita Tungar - Bronze Medalist Athlete in 2010 Commonwealth Games

== Key-highlights and facts ==
Yashwantrao Chavan Maharashtra Open University (YCMOU) has implemented advanced blockchain technology. Blockchain technology was implemented in 2023 becoming India's first University.

Physics Wallah has partnered with Yashwantrao Chavan Maharashtra Open University (YCMOU) to offer online degree programs, like MBA, MCA, MA English, and BCA. The collaboration aims to expand access to higher education through a Four-Quadrant MOOC model combining self-paced learning, live classes, and assessments. The initiative focuses on creating flexible, digitally inclusive pathways aligned with NEP 2020.
