= Osmanabad Assembly constituency =

Constituency of the Maharashtra legislative assembly in India

Coordinates: 18.19°N 76.04°E

Osmanabad
- Constituency No. 242 for the Maharashtra Legislative Assembly

Constituency details
- Country: India
- Region: Western India
- State: Maharashtra
- District: Osmanabad
- Lok Sabha constituency: Osmanabad
- Established: 1951
- Total electors: 375,359
- Reservation: None

Member of Legislative Assembly
- 15th Maharashtra Legislative Assembly
- Incumbent Kailas Patil
- Party: SS(UBT)
- Alliance: MVA
- Elected year: 2024

Osmanabad Assembly constituency is one of the 288 legislative assembly constituencies of Maharashtra state in western India.

== Overview ==
Osmanabad (constituency number 242) is one of the four Legislative Assembly constituencies located in Osmanabad district. It covers the entire Kalamb tehsil and part of Osmanabad tehsil of this district. The number of electors in 2009 was 296,247 (male 157,571, female 138,676).

Osmanabad is part of Osmanabad Lok Sabha constituency along with five other Legislative Assembly constituencies, namely Paranda, Umarga and Tuljapur in Osmanabad district, Barshi in Solapur district and Ausa in Latur district.

== Members of the Legislative Assembly ==
Election	Member	Party
1952	Uddhavrao Sahebrao Patil	Peasants and Workers Party of India
1952	Kallyan Rao	Indian National Congress
1957	Uddhavrao Sahebrao Patil	Peasants and Workers Party of India
1962	Vishwasrao Ganpatrao	Indian National Congress
1967	Uddhavrao Sahebrao Patil	Peasants and Workers Party of India
1972	Survase Gautmarao Ramji	Indian National Congress
1978	Dr. Padamsinh Bajirao Patil	Indian National Congress
1980	Dr. Padamsinh Bajirao Patil	Indian National Congress
1985	Dr. Padamsinh Bajirao Patil	Indian Congress
1990	Dr. Padamsinh Bajirao Patil	Indian National Congress
1995	Dr. Padamsinh Bajirao Patil	Indian National Congress
1999	Dr. Padamsinh Bajirao Patil	Nationalist Congress Party
2004	Dr. Padamsinh Bajirao Patil	Nationalist Congress Party
2009	Omprakash Raje Nimbalkar	Shiv Sena
2014	Ranajagjitsinha Patil	Nationalist Congress Party
2019	Kailas Balasaheb Ghadge Patil	Shiv Sena
2024	Kailas Balasaheb Ghadge Patil	Shiv Sena (UBT)

== Election results ==
=== Assembly Election 2024 ===
2024 Maharashtra Legislative Assembly election : Osmanabad
Party	Candidate	Votes	%	±%
SS(UBT)	Kailas Balasaheb Ghadge Patil	130,573	54.09	New
SS	Ajit Bappasaheb Pingle	94,007	38.94	▼1.84
VBA	Pranit Shamrao Dikale	10,117	4.19	▼3.15
MNS	Deodatta Bhagwat More	2,042	0.85	New
NOTA	None of the above	1,581	0.65	▼0.24
Margin of victory		36,566	15.15	▲8.87
Turnout		242,995	64.74	▲3.50
Total valid votes		241,414		
Registered electors		375,359		▲6.14
SS(UBT) gain from SS		Swing	▲13.31	

=== Assembly Election 2019 ===
2019 Maharashtra Legislative Assembly election : Osmanabad
Party	Candidate	Votes	%	±%
SS	Kailas Balasaheb Ghadge Patil	87,488	40.78	▲4.80
NCP	Sanjay Prakash Nimbalkar	74,021	34.51	▼6.48
Independent	Ajit Bappasaheb Pingle	20,570	9.59	New
VBA	Dhananjay Gangadhar Shingade	15,755	7.34	New
Independent	Suresh Sahebrao Patil	10,014	4.67	New
Sambhaji Brigade Party	Dr. Sandip Manikrao Tambare	2,289	1.07	New
NOTA	None of the above	1,907	0.89	▲0.60
AAP	Adv. Ajit (Anna) Vishwanath Khot Patil	1,298	0.61	New
Margin of victory		13,467	6.28	▲1.27
Turnout		216,591	61.24	▼4.89
Total valid votes		214,511		
Registered electors		353,647		▲7.97
SS gain from NCP		Swing	▼0.21	

=== Assembly Election 2014 ===
2014 Maharashtra Legislative Assembly election : Osmanabad
Party	Candidate	Votes	%	±%
NCP	Ranajagjitsinha Patil	88,469	40.99	▼0.86
SS	Omprakash Raje Nimbalkar	77,663	35.98	▼14.35
BJP	Sanjay Trimbakrao Dudhgaonkar Patil	26,081	12.08	New
INC	Vishwas Jagdevrao Shinde	9,081	4.21	New
AIMIM	Akbarkhan Gulabkhan Pathan	4,555	2.11	New
BSP	Adv. Ghule Jayram Baliram	2,531	1.17	▼0.70
NOTA	None of the above	621	0.29	New
Margin of victory		10,806	5.01	▼3.47
Turnout		216,606	66.13	▼1.54
Total valid votes		215,841		
Registered electors		327,533		▲10.56
NCP gain from SS		Swing	▼9.34	

=== Assembly Election 2009 ===
2009 Maharashtra Legislative Assembly election : Osmanabad
Party	Candidate	Votes	%	±%
SS	Omprakash Raje Nimbalkar	100,709	50.33	New
NCP	Ranajagjitsinha Patil	83,735	41.85	▼3.92
BSP	Jairam Baliram Ghule	3,732	1.87	▼1.30
Shivrajya Party	Anant Jagannath Chonde	1,694	0.85	New
Independent	Shubhangi Shahu Aakhade	1,367	0.68	New
Margin of victory		16,974	8.48	▲8.16
Turnout		200,478	67.67	▼0.37
Total valid votes		200,103		
Registered electors		296,247		▲33.99
SS gain from NCP		Swing	▲4.56	

=== Assembly Election 2004 ===
2004 Maharashtra Legislative Assembly election : Osmanabad
Party	Candidate	Votes	%	±%
NCP	Dr. Padamsinh Bajirao Patil	68,834	45.77	▼0.29
Independent	Bhupalsinh alias Pawan Raje Nimbalkar	68,350	45.45	New
BSP	Khalil Saif Sayyad	4,765	3.17	New
Independent	Lomte Pandit Gurunath	2,762	1.84	New
NLP	Shaikh Rabbani Shaikh Jilani	1,620	1.08	New
Independent	Swami Bhimashankar Shivayya	1,504	1.00	New
Independent	Sudhakar Vishvanathrao Gund	913	0.61	New
Margin of victory		484	0.32	▼13.88
Turnout		150,448	68.04	▼0.76
Total valid votes		150,380		
Registered electors		221,101		▲19.82
NCP hold		Swing	▼0.29	

=== Assembly Election 1999 ===
1999 Maharashtra Legislative Assembly election : Osmanabad
Party	Candidate	Votes	%	±%
NCP	Dr. Padamsinh Bajirao Patil	55,848	46.06	New
INC	Vishwas Jagdevrao Shinde	38,634	31.86	▼16.03
SS	Borkar Shankar Ambrushi	26,281	21.67	▲8.76
Margin of victory		17,214	14.20	▼14.84
Turnout		126,952	68.80	▼6.35
Total valid votes		121,255		
Registered electors		184,533		▲3.13
NCP gain from INC		Swing	▼1.83	

=== Assembly Election 1995 ===
1995 Maharashtra Legislative Assembly election : Osmanabad
Party	Candidate	Votes	%	±%
INC	Dr. Padamsinh Bajirao Patil	62,555	47.89	▼13.46
Independent	Kale Vasantrao Shankarrao	24,616	18.84	New
JD	Gore Arvind Janardhan	22,022	16.86	▼14.76
SS	Ingle Bharat Laxmanrao	16,863	12.91	▲6.32
Independent	Garad Netaji Shivajirao	1,623	1.24	New
Margin of victory		37,939	29.04	▼0.69
Turnout		134,464	75.15	▲8.36
Total valid votes		130,626		
Registered electors		178,932		▲7.82
INC hold		Swing	▼13.46	

=== Assembly Election 1990 ===
1990 Maharashtra Legislative Assembly election : Osmanabad
Party	Candidate	Votes	%	±%
INC	Dr. Padamsinh Bajirao Patil	66,884	61.35	▲20.29
JD	Gore Arvind Janardhan	34,470	31.62	New
SS	Patil Sudhir Keshavrao	7,190	6.59	New
Margin of victory		32,414	29.73	▲13.98
Turnout		110,845	66.79	▼6.84
Total valid votes		109,024		
Registered electors		165,957		▲30.56
INC gain from IC(S)		Swing	▲4.54	

=== Assembly Election 1985 ===
1985 Maharashtra Legislative Assembly election : Osmanabad
Party	Candidate	Votes	%	±%
IC(S)	Dr. Padamsinh Bajirao Patil	52,197	56.81	New
INC	Chavan Madhukarrao Deorao	37,729	41.06	New
Independent	Jadhav Vasantrao Marutrao	1,141	1.24	New
Independent	Bansode Devidas Gunaji	818	0.89	New
Margin of victory		14,468	15.75	▼0.31
Turnout		93,600	73.63	▲7.87
Total valid votes		91,885		
Registered electors		127,116		▲9.60
IC(S) gain from INC(U)		Swing	▲2.86	

=== Assembly Election 1980 ===
1980 Maharashtra Legislative Assembly election : Osmanabad
Party	Candidate	Votes	%	±%
INC(U)	Dr. Padamsinh Bajirao Patil	40,320	53.95	New
INC(I)	Patil Nana Saheb Harishchandra	28,321	37.90	New
PWPI	Ghure Trimbakrao Sridharrao	6,093	8.15	▼20.86
Margin of victory		11,999	16.06	▲2.55
Turnout		76,268	65.76	▼2.88
Total valid votes		74,734		
Registered electors		115,980		▲9.45
INC(U) gain from INC		Swing	▲11.42	

=== Assembly Election 1978 ===
1978 Maharashtra Legislative Assembly election : Osmanabad
Party	Candidate	Votes	%	±%
INC	Dr. Padamsinh Bajirao Patil	29,949	42.53	▼20.64
PWPI	Balbhimrao Narsing Rao Deshmukh	20,433	29.01	▼5.02
Independent	Shaikh Maqbool Ahmed Mohemmed Hanif	10,673	15.15	New
JP	Vyankatrao Ambadasrao Hambire	8,916	12.66	New
Independent	Mohammed Mahboob Dadamiva	455	0.65	New
Margin of victory		9,516	13.51	▼15.63
Turnout		72,733	68.64	▲9.14
Total valid votes		70,426		
Registered electors		105,966		▲12.40
INC hold		Swing	▼20.64	

=== Assembly Election 1972 ===
1972 Maharashtra Legislative Assembly election : Osmanabad
Party	Candidate	Votes	%	±%
INC	Survase Gautmarao Ramji	34,220	63.17	▲18.14
PWPI	Ghogre Balwant Yadavrao	18,436	34.03	▼13.98
Independent	Vithal Rao Raje	1,517	2.80	New
Margin of victory		15,784	29.14	▲26.15
Turnout		56,091	59.50	▼9.75
Total valid votes		54,173		
Registered electors		94,275		▲17.11
INC gain from PWPI		Swing	▲15.16	

=== Assembly Election 1967 ===
1967 Maharashtra Legislative Assembly election : Osmanabad
Party	Candidate	Votes	%	±%
PWPI	Uddhavrao Sahebrao Patil	24,877	48.01	▲2.31
INC	K. D. Samudra	23,330	45.03	▼3.47
Independent	S. L. Bansode	2,650	5.11	New
ABJS	B. S. Deshmukh	958	1.85	New
Margin of victory		1,547	2.99	▲0.19
Turnout		55,746	69.25	▲12.01
Total valid votes		51,815		
Registered electors		80,498		▲19.10
PWPI gain from INC		Swing	▼0.49	

=== Assembly Election 1962 ===
1962 Maharashtra Legislative Assembly election : Osmanabad
Party	Candidate	Votes	%	±%
INC	Vishwasrao Ganpatrao	17,500	48.50	▲14.39
PWPI	Narsingrao Balbhimrao	16,490	45.70	▼4.64
PSP	Janardhanrao Eknathrao	2,095	5.81	New
Margin of victory		1,010	2.80	▼13.43
Turnout		38,689	57.24	▲1.99
Total valid votes		36,085		
Registered electors		67,591		▲16.56
INC gain from PWPI		Swing	▼1.84	

=== Assembly Election 1957 ===
1957 Bombay State Legislative Assembly election : Osmanabad
Party	Candidate	Votes	%	±%
PWPI	Uddhavrao Sahebrao Patil	16,127	50.34	▲26.27
INC	Phoolchand Ramchand	10,928	34.11	▼8.27
Independent	Rambhau Raghunath	4,984	15.56	New
Margin of victory		5,199	16.23	▲13.14
Turnout		32,039	55.25	▼45.21
Total valid votes		32,039		
Registered electors		57,989		▼44.06
PWPI hold		Swing	▲26.27	

=== Assembly Election 1952 ===
1952 Hyderabad State Legislative Assembly election : Osmanabad
Party	Candidate	Votes	%	±%
PWPI	Uddhavrao Sahebrao Patil	25,066	24.07	New
INC	Kallyan Rao	23,715	22.77	New
SCF	Prahlad Rao	21,844	20.98	New
INC	Venkatesh Bapu Rao	20,425	19.61	New
Independent	Dongre Krishnaji	6,148	5.90	New
Independent	Datoba	2,819	2.71	New
SP	Dattatry	2,177	2.09	New
ABHM	Bhaskar Rao	1,949	1.87	New
Margin of victory		3,222	3.09	
Turnout		104,143	50.23	
Total valid votes		104,143		
Registered electors		103,664		
PWPI win (new seat)				

== See also ==
- Osmanabad
