= Ravindra Gaikwad =

Indian politician

Member of the India Parliament for Osmanabad
- In office May 2014 – May 2019
- Preceded by: Padamsinh Bajirao Patil
- Succeeded by: Omprakash Rajenimbalkar

Member of the Maharashtra Legislative Assembly for Umarga
- In office 2004–2009
- Preceded by: Basavraj Madhavrao Patil
- Succeeded by: Dnyanraj Chougule
- In office 1995–1999
- Preceded by: Kazi Abdul Khalek A. Kadar
- Succeeded by: Basavraj Madhavrao Patil

Personal details
- Born: 27 April 1960 (age 66) Solapur, Bombay State, India
- Party: Shiv Sena
- Education: Dr. Babasaheb Ambedkar Marathwada University

Ravindra Vishwanath Gaikwad (born 27 April 1960) is an Indian politician associated with Shiv Sena, and was a member of the 16th Lok Sabha of India from 2014 to 2019 as a member of Shiv Sena. He did not contest Lok Sabha elections in 2019. In 2014, he had contested from Osmanabad constituency of Maharashtra, and defeated sitting MP Padamsinha Bajirao Patil who contested from the Nationalist Congress Party by 235,325 votes by obtaining 607,699 votes against Patil's 373,374. Before 2014, he was a two time MLA from Umarga constituency. He has also been the Chairman of Killari Sugar Factory. He is a director on the agriculture board committee in the Central Government of India. His son Kiran Ravindra Gaikwad lost the Zilla parishad Osmanabad election from kunhali constituency. The loss to Prakash Ashte was widely discussed in the media.

== Controversies ==
Ravindra Gaikwad himself has various criminal charges against him which include voluntarily causing hurt to deter public servants from duty, criminal intimidation and rioting among others.

On 23 March 2017, while travelling to Delhi from Pune, he was accused of hitting a 60-year old Air India staff member with his sandal 25 times and attempting to throw him out of the plane. This act led all of the Indian aviation companies to impose a No-Fly ban on him. Delhi police filed two criminal charges on him: one for hitting the government staff on duty and the other for taking the plane ransom without departing from the plane. He has been designated as the first person on the NoFly list in India. The incident happened when the Air India flight AI852 from Pune reached Delhi around 10.30 a.m. on March 23, 2017.

Earlier, in 2014 he was in a row over trying to force-feed a Muslim caterer during the fasting month of Ramzan.

In April 2017, Ravindra Gaikwad and his supporters were booked for unlawful assembly, misbehaviour and causing disorder at a public place following an incident in Latur, Maharashtra, where he allegedly behaved rudely with police officials, staged an agitation and shouted slogans. This was in response to his inability to get money from an ATM. He expressed concerns about lack of availability of cash despite significant passage of time after demonetization. He expressed a view that it was the Union Finance Minister as well as the Maharashtra Finance Minister's responsibility to rectify the situation.

== Positions held ==
- 1995 - 1999 : Member, State Legislative Assembly, Maharashtra
- 2004 - 2009 : Member, State Legislative Assembly, Maharashtra
- 2014 : Elected to 16th Lok Sabha
- 1 Sep. 2014 onwards : Member, Standing Committee on Agriculture

== See also ==
- List of members of the 16th Lok Sabha
- Umarga (Vidhan Sabha constituency)
