= Madhukarrao Chavan =

Indian politician from Maharashtra state

Member of Maharashtra Legislative Assembly
- In office (1990-1995), (1999-2004), (2004-2009), (2009-2014), (2014 – 2019)
- Preceded by: Manikrao Khapale
- Succeeded by: Ranajagjitsinha Patil
- Constituency: Tuljapur

Personal details
- Born: Andur, Tuljapur, Osmanabad District

Madhukarrao Chavan is an Indian politician from Maharashtra state. He is currently serving his 5th term in the Maharashtra Legislative Assembly. He was the cabinet Minister of Maharashtra Govt of Animal Husbandry, Dairying, Fisheries Department. Indian National Congress leader is the MLA of Tuljapur Vidhan Sabha constituency in Osmanabad district elected in 2014 state general elections.

Chavan is a resident of Andur in Tuljapur Taluka. He is a president and chairman of many co operative, education institutions. He is contesting Assembly elections from 1985. In 1985, he lost to Padmasingh Patil in Osmanabad constituency. But in 1990, he won in Tuljapur constituency. Again in 1995, he lost to Manikrao Khapale of SKP. From 1999, he is winning the Tuljapur constituency for consecutive four times{1999, 2004, 2009, 2014}.
