= Basavraj Madhavrao Patil =

Indian politician

Basavraj M. Patil

Member of Maharashtra Legislative Council
- Incumbent
- Assumed office 22 June 2026
- Preceded by: Suresh Dhas
- Constituency: Osamanabad -Latur-Beed Local Authority

Member of Maharashtra Legislative Assembly
- In office 2009–2019
- Preceded by: Dinkar Baburao Mane
- Succeeded by: Abhimanyu Dattatray Pawar
- Constituency: Ausa
- In office 05 Sep 1999 – 13 Oct 2004
- Preceded by: Ravindra Gaikwad
- Succeeded by: Ravindra Gaikwad
- Constituency: Umarga

Personal details
- Born: 23 April 1957 (age 69) Murum, Omerga, Osmanabad, Maharashtra, India
- Citizenship: India
- Party: Bharatiya Janata Party (From 2024)
- Other political affiliations: Indian National Congress (Till 2024)
- Spouse: Pramila Patil
- Children: Sharan Patil (son)
- Parent: Madhavrao Bapurao Patil (father)
- Education: Bachelor of Arts
- Alma mater: Yashwantrao Chavan University
- Occupation: Politician

Basavraj Madhavrao Patil is a member of the 13th Maharashtra Legislative Assembly. He represents the Ausa Assembly Constituency. He was belonging to the Indian National Congress coming from Lingayat community. He was one of standing ministers who lost the election in 2004 to Ravindra Vishvanath Gaikwad. He also lost the 2019 election to new entrant Abhimanyu Pawar. On 26 February 2024 he resigned as primary member of The Indian National Congress (INC).

== Political career ==
He was ex state minister of Maharashtra in 1999-2004. He was MLA from Omerga-lohara constituency. Also he was MLA from Ausa constituency in 12th and 13th assembly of Maharashtra. On 26 February 2024 he resigned as primary member of The Indian National Congress (INC).

== Positions held ==
Ex gramvikas minister of Maharashtra.

Three time MLA from Omerga and Ausa constituency. He is president of Vithal Sai sugar factory and working president of Maharashtra Pradesh congress committee.
