= Dharashiv Caves =

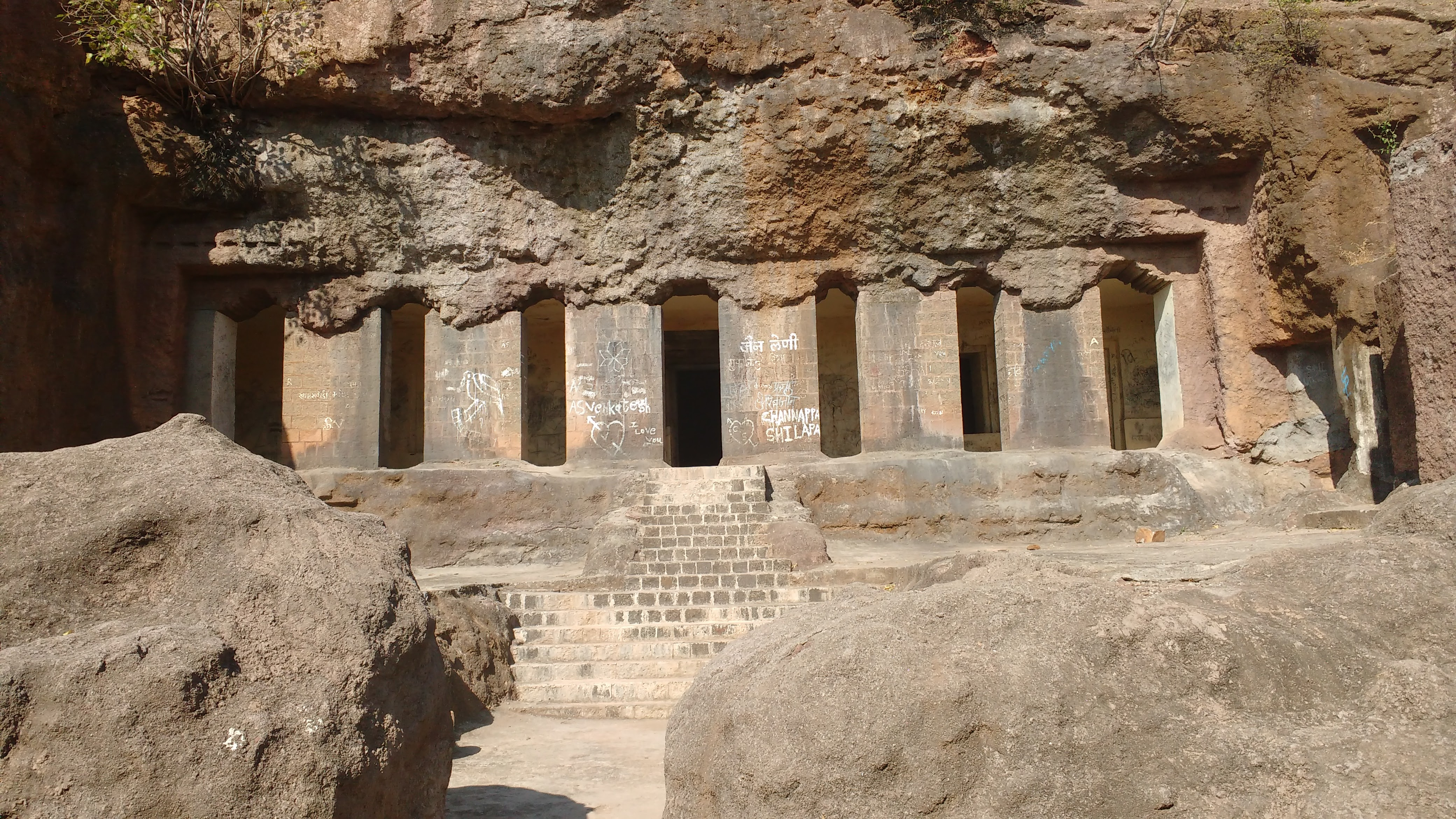
- Dharashiv cave main hall

- Location in Maharashtra
- Coordinates: 18°11′44″N 76°0′36″E
- Country: India
- State: Maharashtra
- District: Osmanabad district
- Dating: 5th century AD
- Discovery: 10th Century
- ISO 3166 code: IN-MH

Dharashiv caves are the nexus of seven Sramanic caves located 8 km away from Osmanabad, in Balaghat mountains in Maharashtra state of India. The caves were taken note by Archaeological Department of India and mentioned in the book Archaeological survey of India by James Burges. Dharashiv Caves have been declared as Protected area by Government of Maharashtra.

== History ==
Dharashiv caves are believed to be built around the 5th-7th centuries. The first cave was discovered in the 10th century during the age of Rashtrakutas. While there have been debates over caves whether they are Buddhist or Jain creations. It is believed that these caves were originally the Jain caves as there are many Digambar teerthankar idols in Khadagasan and Kayotsarg position.

== Caves ==
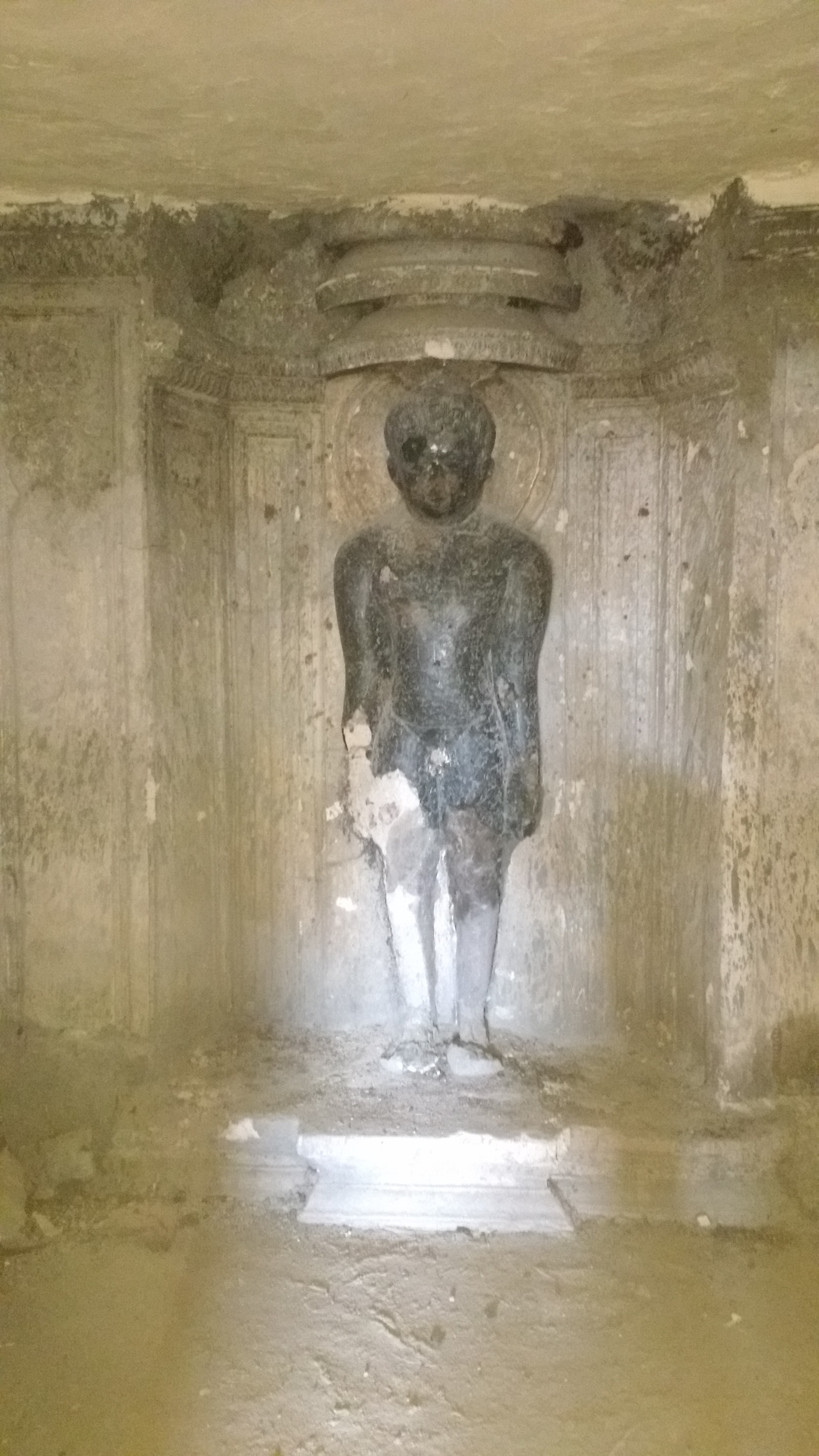
Mahavir Swami

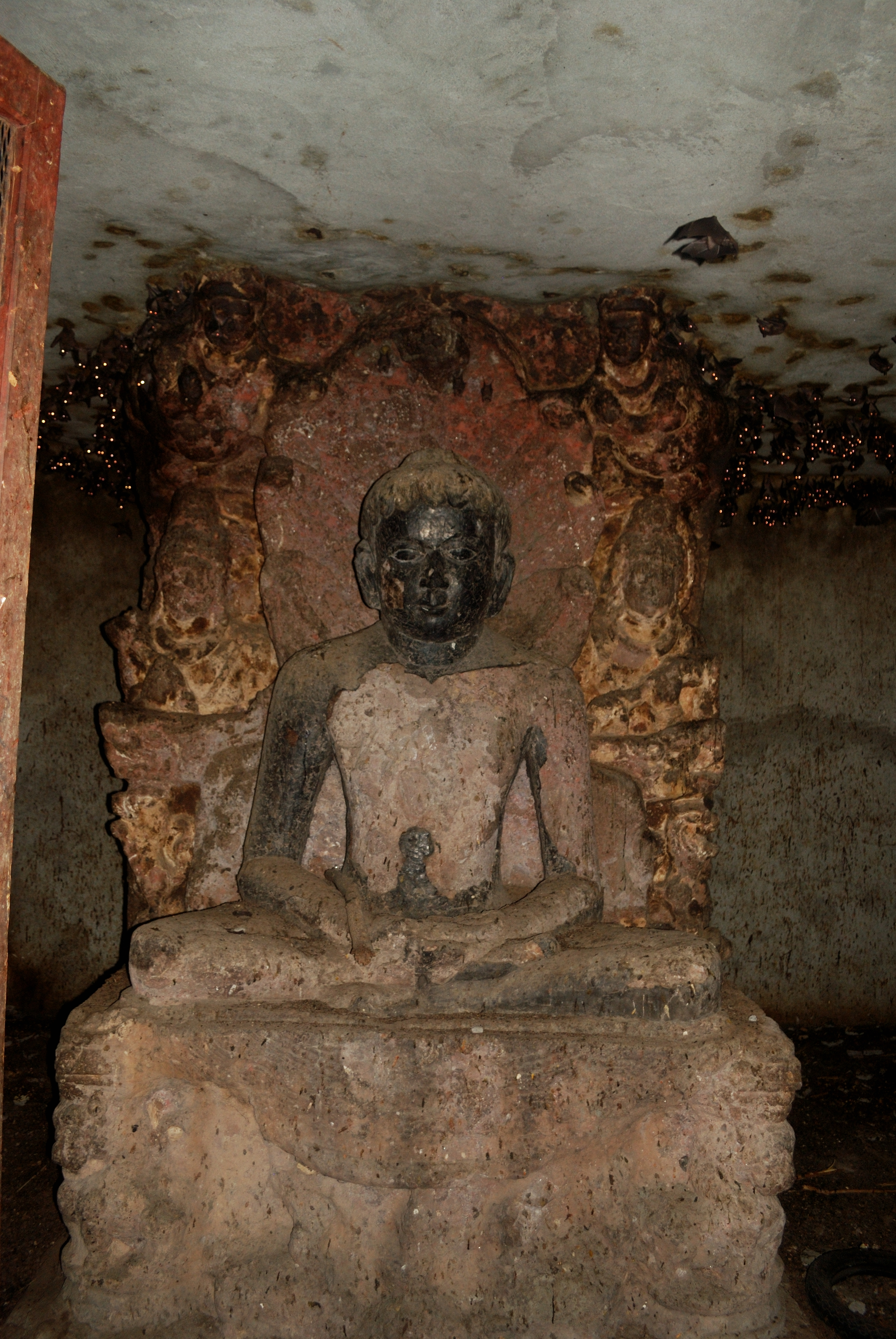
Parshvanatha

There are seven caves, 1st cave is harnessed by 20 pillars of scaffolding. Cave No. 2 is among major caves and modeled on the plan of the Vakataka caves at Ajantha. It has a central hall measuring 80 feet by 80 feet, with 14 cells for the residence of the Bhiksus and garbhagraha with a statue of the Gautam Buddha in Padmasana. 3rd cave resembles with 1st, while later caves are Jain caves.

== Current status ==
Dharashiv caves are claimed by both Buddhist and Jain traditions. However, research done by James Burges on 1200 caves in Maharashtra state showed that Dharashiv caves were originally Buddhist caves in the 5th century AD, while in the 10th century some caves were constructed for Jain monks by Rashtrakuta kings.

== See also ==
- Ajanta Caves
- Ellora Caves
- Tulja Bhavani Temple
