= Undargaon =

Village in Maharashtra

- village
- Location in Maharashtra, India Undargaon (India)
- Country: India
- State: Maharashtra
- District: Solapur district

Languages
  - Official: Marathi
- Time zone: UTC+5:30 (IST)

Undargaon is a village in the Karmala taluka of Solapur district in Maharashtra state, India.

== Demographics ==
Covering 734 hectares (1,810 acres) and comprising 164 households at the time of the 2011 census of India, Undargaon had a population of 700. There were 380 males and 320 females, with 90 people being aged six or younger.
