= Marathwada Statutory Development Board =

Marathwada Statutory Development Board (MSDB) is a constitutional body created by Presidential Order in 1994 to develop Marathwada region of Maharashtra and to decrease regional imbalance in development within the state.

MSDB releases annual report assessing problems within various districts of Marathwada, also monitors development work and expenditure.

== Constitutional Provision ==
Article 371(2) of Constitution of India is a special provision in respect of States of Maharashtra and Gujarat. According to this article, President of India can give special responsibility to Governors of Maharashtra and Gujarat to create separate development boards for Vidarbha, Marathwada, rest of Maharashtra regions of Maharashtra and Kutch, Saurashtra regions of Gujarat.

== Major Findings of Annual Report ==
| Region | Small, Medium Industries(%) | Large Industries(%) | Per Capita Income(Rs) | Special Economic Zones | Foreign Direct Investment(%) |
|---|---|---|---|---|---|
| Marathwada | 07 | 11 | 60,013 | 10 | 02 |
| Vidarbha | 13 | 14 | 65,502 | 10 | 08 |
| Rest of Maharashtra | 80 | 75 | 105,488 | 96 | 90 |

- Annual Report 2011-12 shows some of striking findings of regional imbalance in Maharashtra.
- Of total 'Micro, Small, Medium Enterprises' in Maharashtra, Marathwada has only 7% of enterprises while Vidarbha has 13%, rest of Maharashtra has 80% of total enterprises.
- Of total 'Large Industries', Marathwada has 11%, Vidarbha 14% while Rest of Maharashtra has 75%.
- Per capita income of Marathwada is Rs.60013, Vidarbha Rs.65502, Rest of Maharashtra Rs.105488.
- Of total 116 Special Economic Zones of Maharashtra, Marathwada has 10, Vidarbha 10 and Rest of Maharashtra 96.
- Of total Foreign Direct Investment in Maharashtra, only 2% is in Marathwada while Vidarbha has 8% and Rest of Maharashtra has 90%.

Above findings shows that development of Maharashtra is concentrated in Western region that is rest of Maharashtra while Marathwada region is least developed region in Maharashtra. Report also says that whatever development happened in Marathwada is concentrated around Aurangabad.
