= Ranajagjitsinha Patil =

Indian politician

Ranajagjitsinha P. Patil

Member of Maharashtra Legislative Assembly
- Incumbent
- Assumed office (2019-2024), (2024-Present)
- Preceded by: Madhukarrao Chavan
- Constituency: Tuljapur
- In office (2014–2019)
- Preceded by: Omraje Nimbalkar
- Succeeded by: Kailas Patil
- Constituency: Osmanabad

Member of Maharashtra Legislative Council
- In office (2002-2008), (2008 – 2014)
- Constituency: elected by Members of Legislative Assembly

Personal details
- Born: 30 October 1971 (age 54) Osmanabad, Maharashtra
- Party: Bhartiya Janata Party (2019 onwards)
- Other political affiliations: Nationalist Congress Party (Till 2019)
- Spouse: Archana Patil
- Parent: Padamsinh Bajirao Patil

Ranajagjitsinha Padmasinh Patil (born 30 October 1971) is a member of Maharashtra Legislative Assembly, from Tuljapur in Maharashtra state. In March 2025, he is appointed as the Vice Chairman of the Maharashtra Institution for Transformation (MITRA), a government think tank aimed at driving Maharashtra’s development into a trillion-dollar economy and He is the son of Former Home Minister of Maharashtra Padamsinha Bajirao Patil. .

== Political career ==
He joined the Bharatiya Janata Party in the presence of Bharatiya Janata Party President Amit Shah and he was elected to the 14th Vidhan Sabha on a Bharatiya Janata Party ticket in the October 2019 state elections in Tuljapur Vidhan Sabha constituency. He has won the Tuljapur Vidhan Sabha constituency for the second consecutive time in the 2024 elections. He was elected to the Vidhan Sabha from the Osmanabad Vidhan Sabha in the October 2014 state elections. He was a member of the Maharashtra Legislative Council for 2 terms 2004-2008 & 2008–2014. His first stint in politics was after his induction as Minister of State in the Government of Maharashtra and handled numerous portfolios which include, Revenue, Industries, Agriculture, GAD, Protocol & Cultural Affairs.
