= Dhanori =

- village
- Location in Gujarat, India
- Coordinates: 20.75°N 72.95°E
- Country: India
- State: Gujarat
- District: Navsari

Area
  - Total: 3 km^{2} (1.2 sq mi)
- Elevation: 4 m (13 ft)

Population (2001)
  - Total: 3,000
  - Density: 1,000/km^{2} (2,600/sq mi)

Languages
  - Official: Gujarati, Hindi
- Time zone: UTC+5:30 (IST)
- PIN: 396360
- Telephone code: 02634

Dhanori is a small village in Navsari district in the state of Gujarat, India. It is about 40 kilometres (25 mi) north of the city of Valsad and about 25 kilometres (16 mi) south of the district city of Navsari.

Dhanori is well connected to Surat, Bilimora, Navsari, Gandevi by road, and it is in these places that most of the village population work. Their primary occupation is that of farming i.e Rice, sugarcane, chickoo and Mango. Dhanori also has one primary school and one Ashram Sala. Dhanori is located 5 Km away from National highway no.8 which is connected between Mumbai and Ahmedabad.

Dhanori hosts annual Diwali function which is well known within Navsari district. The function includes competitions such as Rangoli, Aarti decoration, food dishes, Music and various sports.
