= Achaler =

Village in Maharashtra, India

Coordinates: 17.728°N 76.398°E

Achaler is a village in Maharashtra, India. It is located in Lohara Taluka in Osmanabad district. The village resides in the Marathwada region, and falls under the supervision of the Aurangabad division. Located 73 km towards south from the district headquarters Osmanabad, the village is also 34 km from Lohara and 468 km from the state capital Mumbai.

== Demographics ==
The main language spoken here is Marathi. According to the 2011 Census, the total population of Achaler village is 5935 and number of houses are 1272. The population of female citizens is 50% and the rate of female literacy is 29%.

== Nearby villages ==
- Sindgaon is 6 km away
- Bolegaon is 7 km away
- Ambarnagar is 8 km away
- Kesar Jawalga is 9 km away

Achaler is surrounded by Åland taluka towards east, Lohara taluka towards north, Akkalkot taluka towards south, Tuljapur taluka towards west.

== Nearby cities ==
The cities near to Achaler are Umarga, Tuljapur, Nilanga, Solapur.

== Postal details ==
The postal head office for Achaler is Naldurg. The pin code of Achaler is 413602.

== Politics ==
The National Congress Party (NCP), Shiv Sena, SHS and INC are the major political parties in Achaler.

=== Polling stations near Achaler ===
1. Z.P.P.S Fanepur south side
2. Z.P.P.S Sastur north side
3. Z.P.P.S Achaler east side
4. Z.P.P.S Girls Achaler North side
5. Z.P.P.S Girls Achaler new building east side

== Education ==
The colleges near Achaler are:

1. NSB college
2. National Backward Agriculture Education Information Technology Osmanabad

The schools in Achaler are:

1. V.V. High school and Higher secondary school.
