= Milind College =

College in Aurangabad, Maharashtra

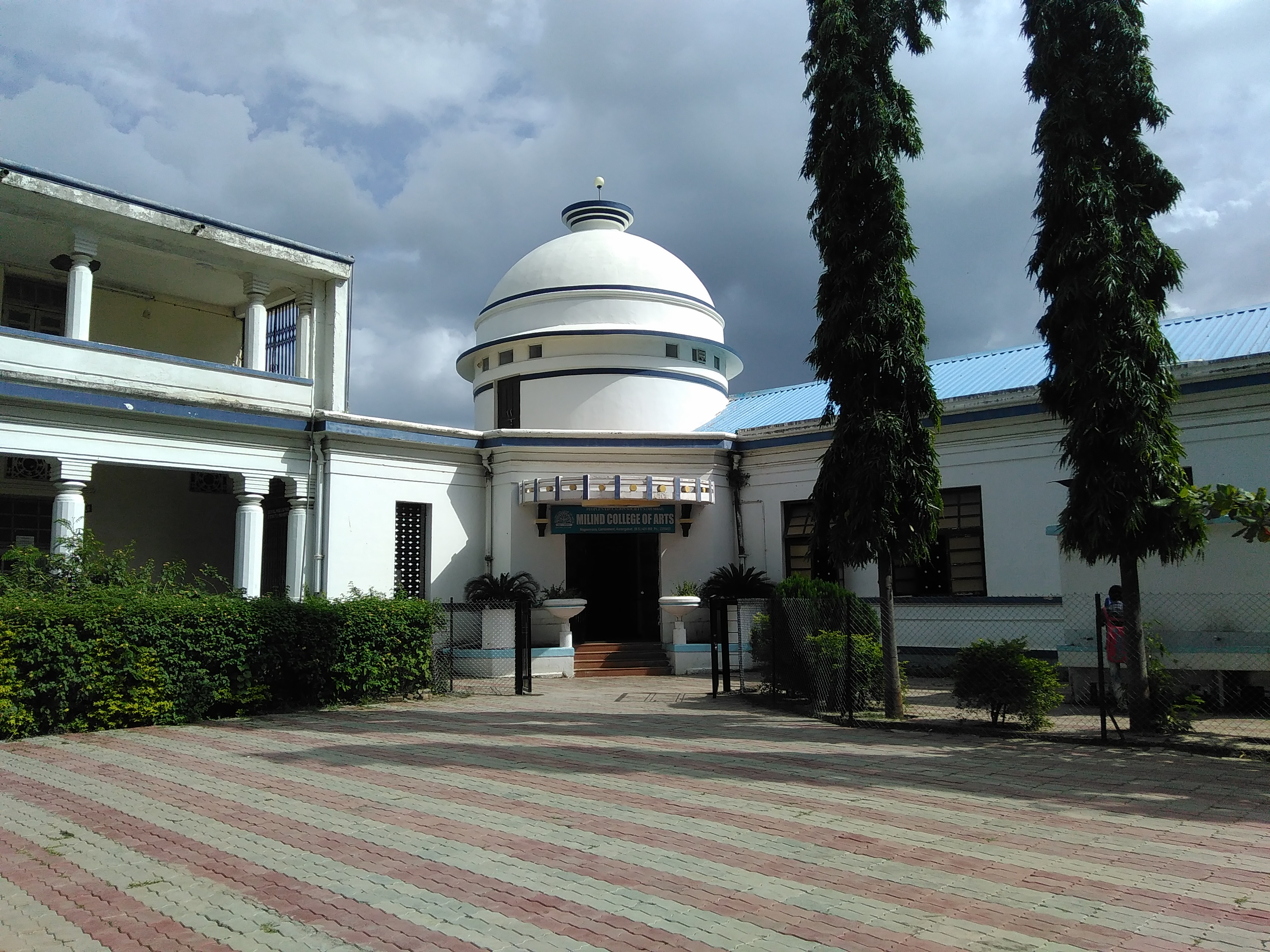
- Type: Public
- Established: 19 June 1950
- Affiliations: Dr. Babasaheb Ambedkar Marathwada University
- Location: Aurangabad, Maharashtra, India
- Website: http://www.milindscience.org, http://www.milindarts.com

Milind College is a group of three coeducational general degree colleges located in Aurangabad, Maharashtra, India, namely Milind College of Science, Milind College of Arts, and Dr. Babasaheb Ambedkar College of Commerce. They offer undergraduate courses in arts, commerce and sciences. All three colleges are affiliated with Dr. Babasaheb Ambedkar Marathwada University. The college is named after Milind, the Indo-Greek king.

== History ==
The 7th Nizam of Hyderabad, Mir Osman Ali Khan had allotted 54 acres of land to Dr. B. R. Ambedkar for the establishment of Milind Mahavidyalaya. The growth of Milind Mahavidyalaya prompted the leaders of the Society to divide the college into Dr. Babasaheb Ambedkar College of Commerce in 1960 and "Milind College of Arts" and Milind College of Science in 1963.

=== Courses ===
Milind College of Science:

Biotechnology, Physics, Mathematics, Chemistry, Electronics, Botany, Zoology, Computer Science, Fishery Science.

Milind College of Arts :

Marathi, English, Hindi, Sanskrit, History, Political Science, Economics, Sociology

Dr. Babasaheb Ambedkar College of Commerce:

Commerce, Business Administration

=== Accreditation ===
The college is recognized by the University Grants Commission (UGC).
