= Kalpana Ramesh Narhire =

Indian politician

- कल्पना नरहिरे
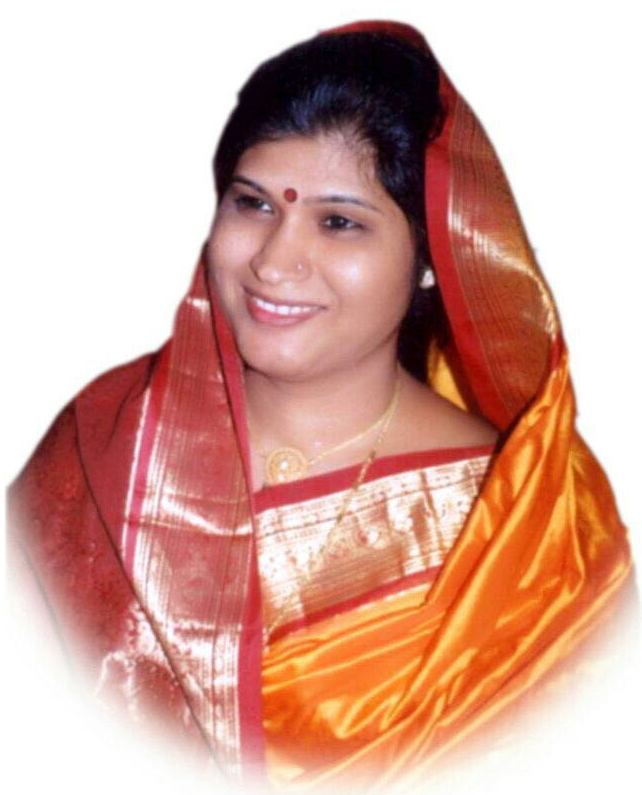

Member of Parliament
- Constituency: Osmanabad

Personal details
- Born: 25 October 1969 (age 56) Osmanabad, Maharashtra, India
- Party: Shiv Sena
- Spouse: Ramesh Bhagwanrao Narhire
- Children: Neeraj Narhire Neha Narhire

Narhire Kalpana Ramesh (Marathi: कल्पना नरहिरे) (born 25 October 1969) is a Shiv Sena politician from Osmanabad district. She was a member of the 14th Lok Sabha of India representing Osmanabad constituency of Maharashtra.

== Positions held ==
- 1995: Re-elected to Maharashtra Legislative Assembly (1st term)
- 1999: Re-elected to Maharashtra Legislative Assembly (2nd term)
- 2004: Elected to 14th Lok Sabha
