= Dhoki, Osmanabad =

Village in Maharashtra

Dhoki
- Village
- Location in Maharashtra Dhoki (India)
- Coordinates: 18.2786911°N 76.0536239°E
- Country: India
- State: Maharashtra
- District: Osmanabad

Government
  - Type: Gram panchayat
- Elevation: 679 m (2,228 ft)

Population (2011)
  - Total: 15,303
- Demonym: Dhokikar

Languages
  - Official: Marathi
- Time zone: UTC+5:30 (IST)
- PIN: 413508
- Telephone code: 02472

Dhoki is a major village in Osmanabad taluka of Osmanabad district in the Indian state of Maharashtra. It is located 24 kilometres (15 mi) from Osmanabad. In 2011, village had population of 15,303 with literacy rate of 82% and average sex ratio of 936. Village has Primary Health Centre.
