= Udhavrao Patil =

Indian politician

Uddhavrao Patil

Member of Parliament, Lok Sabha
- In office 1977 - 1980
- Preceded by: Tulsiram Kamble
- Succeeded by: Shivraj Patil
- Constituency: Latur

Leader of the Opposition in the Maharashtra Legislative Assembly
- In office 1958 -1959
- Preceded by: Shreedhar Mahadev Joshi
- Succeeded by: Vithalrao Devidasrao Deshpande

Member of Samyukta Maharashtra Samiti
- In office 1959 - 1984

Personal details
- Born: Uddhavrao Sahebrao Patil; January 30, 1920 Mankeshwar, Hyderabad state, British India
- Died: 12 July 1984 (aged 64)
- Party: Peasants and Workers Party of India
- Spouse: Shardabai

Uddhavrao Sahebrao Patil (1920-1984) was an Indian politician. He was the leader of the Peasants and Workers Party of India (PWPI). He was elected to the Lok Sabha, the lower house of the Parliament of India as a member of the Peasants and Workers Party of India.

He is an Agriculturist. He was Secretary of Maratha Education Society (MES), 1945. He is previously associated with Congress And took part in Independence Movement from 1945 to 1947. He was a representative of the Hyderabad Legislative Assembly from 1952—57. He was Secretary, Peasants and Workers Party, from 1953—55. He was a member of the Maharashtra Legislative Assembly from 1957—62 And again from 1967—71. He was the Leader of the Opposition in the Maharashtra Legislative Assembly in 1958. He offered Satyagraha in Belgaon for Sanyukta Maharashtra in 1959. He becomes a member of the Rajya Sabha from 1964—67.

He was Chairman of the Public Accounts Committee, Maharashtra, 1969-71. He was Director of Maharashtra State Co-operative Land Development Bank Ltd. 1973—77. He was imprisoned for two months in 1976 under Defence of India Rules. He was a Member of the Estimates Committee in 1977. He was a member of (i) Terna Sakhar Karkhana, Dhoki, Osmanabad (ii) BHOGAWATI SAHAKARI SAKHAR KARKHANA, Vairag, Barshi, Solapur.
