= Kailas Patil =

Indian politician (born 1982)

Kailas Balasaheb Ghadge Patil
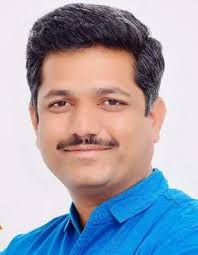

Member of the Maharashtra Legislative Assembly
- Incumbent
- Assumed office (2019-2024), (2024-Present)
- Preceded by: Ranajagjitsinha Patil
- Constituency: Osmanabad

Personal details
- Born: 25 February 1982 (age 43); Sarola bk, Osmanabad, Maharashtra, India
- Political party: Shiv Sena (Uddhav Balasaheb Thackeray)

Kailas Balasaheb Ghadge Patil is an Indian politician from Osmanabad, Maharashtra. He is a current member of the Maharashtra Legislative Assembly from the Osmanabad Vidhan Sabha constituency as a member of Shiv Sena (Uddhav Balasaheb Thackeray).

== Positions held ==
- 2017: Elected as member of Osmanabad Zilla Parishad
- 2017: Appointed Shiv Sena Osmanabad District President
- 2019: Elected to Maharashtra Legislative Assembly
- 2024: Elected to Maharashtra Legislative Assembly
