= Osmanabad Lok Sabha constituency =

Lok Sabha constituency in Maharashtra

Coordinates: 18.2°N 76.0°E

Osmanabad
- Lok Sabha constituency
- Osmanabad Lok Sabha Constituency map

Constituency details
- Country: India
- Region: Western India
- State: Maharashtra
- Assembly constituencies: Ausa; Umarga; Tuljapur; Osmanabad; Paranda; Barshi
- Established: 1952
- Reservation: None

Member of Parliament
- 18th Lok Sabha
- Incumbent Omprakash Raje Nimbalkar
- Party: SHS
- Alliance: NDA
- Elected year: 2024
- Preceded by: Ravindra Gaikwad

Osmanabad Lok Sabha constituency is one of the 48 Lok Sabha (parliamentary) constituencies in Maharashtra state in western India.

== Assembly segments ==
Presently, Osmanabad Lok Sabha constituency comprises six Vidhan Sabha (legislative assembly) segments. These segments are:

No	Name	District	Member	Party	Leading (in 2024)
239	Ausa	Latur	Abhimanyu Pawar	BJP	SS(UBT)
240	Umarga (SC)	Osmanabad	Pravin Swami	SS(UBT)	SS(UBT)
241	Tuljapur	Osmanabad	Ranajagjitsinha Patil	BJP	SS(UBT)
242	Osmanabad	Osmanabad	Kailas Patil	SS(UBT)	SS(UBT)
243	Paranda	Osmanabad	Tanaji Sawant	SHS	SS(UBT)
246	Barshi	Solapur	Dilip Sopal	SS(UBT)	SS(UBT)

== Members of Parliament ==
Year	Member	Party
1952	Raghvendrarao Divan	Indian National Congress
1957	Venkatrao Naldurgker	Indian National Congress
1962	Tulsiram Patil	Indian National Congress
1967	Tulsiram Patil	Indian National Congress
1971	Tulsiram Patil	Indian National Congress
1977	Tukaram Shrangare	Indian National Congress
1980	Trimbak Marotrao Sawant	Indian National Congress (I)
1984	Arvind Kamble	Indian National Congress
1989	Arvind Kamble	Indian National Congress
1991	Arvind Kamble	Indian National Congress
1996	Shivaji Kamble	Shiv Sena
1998	Arvind Kamble	Indian National Congress
1999	Shivaji Kamble	Shiv Sena
2004	Kalpana Narhire	Shiv Sena
2009	Padamsinha Bajirao Patil	Nationalist Congress Party
2014	Ravindra Gaikwad	Shiv Sena
2019	Omprakash Raje Nimbalkar	Shiv Sena
2024	Omprakash Raje Nimbalkar	Shiv Sena (UBT)

== Election results ==
Vote share of Winning candidates
2024	58.45%
2019	49.52%
2014	54.35%
2009	44.22%
2004	46.15%
1999	39.82%
1998	52.81%
1996	42.06%
1991	52.13%
1989	56.03%
1984	53.13%
1980	52.70%
1977	59.60%
1971	57.66%
1967	50.28%
1962	49.56%
1957	52.69%
1951	52.35%

=== 2024 ===
2024 Indian general election: Osmanabad
Party	Candidate	Votes	%	±%
SS(UBT)	Omprakash Nimbalkar	748,752	58.45	
NCP	Archana Ranajagjitsinha Patil	4,18,906	32.70	▼6.24
VBA	Bhausaheb Raosaheb Andhalkar	33,402	2.61	▼5.57
NOTA	None of the above	4,298	0.34	▼0.49
IND	18 Independent Candidates	51,050	3.99	
OTH	10 Other Party Candidates	24,644	1.92	
Majority		3,29,846	25.75	▲15.17
Turnout		12,82,443	64.24	▲0.49
SS(UBT) gain from SS		Swing		

=== 2019 ===
2019 Indian general election: Osmanabad
Party	Candidate	Votes	%	±%
SS	Omprakash Nimbalkar	596,640	49.52	▼4.83
NCP	Ranajagjitsinha Patil	4,69,074	38.94	▲5.55
VBA	Arjun Dada Salgar	98,579	8.18	
NOTA	None of the above	10,024	0.83	▲0.42
IND	7 Independent Candidates	19,815	1.64	
OTH	4 Other Party Candidates	10,598	0.88	
Majority		1,27,566	10.58	▼10.38
Turnout		12,04,730	63.75	▲0.19
SS hold		Swing		

=== 2014 ===
2014 Indian general election: Osmanabad
Party	Candidate	Votes	%	±%
SS	Ravindra Gaikwad	607,699	54.35	▲10.86
NCP	Padamsinh Patil	3,73,374	33.39	▼10.83
BSP	Dhale Padmasheel	28,322	2.53	▼0.50
NOTA	None of the above	4,613	0.41	
IND	16 Independent Candidates	83,965	7.51	
OTH	8 Other Party Candidates	20,178	1.80	
Majority		2,34,325	20.96	▲20.23
Turnout		11,18,151	63.56	▲6.09
SS gain from NCP		Swing		

=== 2009 ===
2009 Indian general election: Osmanabad
Party	Candidate	Votes	%	±%
NCP	Padamsinh Patil	408,840	44.22	▼1.68
SS	Ravindra Gaikwad	4,02,053	43.49	▼2.66
BSP	Divakar Y. Nakade	28,045	3.03	
IND	14 Independent Candidates	59,049	6.39	
OTH	8 Other Party Candidates	26,560	2.87	
Majority		6,787	0.73	▲0.48
Turnout		9,24,564	57.47	
NCP gain from SS		Swing		

=== 2004 ===
2004 Indian general election: Osmanabad
Party	Candidate	Votes	%	±%
SS	Kalpana Narhire	294,436	46.15	▲6.33
NCP	Laxman Kondiba Dhobale	2,92,787	45.90	▲15.41
IND	4 Independent Candidates	27,946	4.38	
OTH	2 Other Party Candidates	22,764	3.57	
Majority		1,649	0.25	▼9.08
Turnout		6,37,933		
SS hold		Swing		

=== 1999 ===
1999 Indian general election: Osmanabad
Party	Candidate	Votes	%	±%
SS	Shivaji Kamble	252,135	39.82	▼4.14
NCP	Deokule Kanifnath	1,93,062	30.49	
INC	Arvind Kamble	1,67,005	26.38	▼26.43
IND	Vithal Kundlik Raut	15,670	2.47	
BSP	Sanjaykumar Waghmare	5,315	0.84	
Majority		59,073	9.33	▲0.48
Turnout		6,67,062	71.24	▲12.32
SS gain from INC		Swing		

=== 1998 ===
1998 Indian general election: Osmanabad
Party	Candidate	Votes	%	±%
INC	Arvind Kamble	280,592	52.81	▲14.12
SS	Shivaji Kamble	2,33,574	43.96	▲1.90
JD	Vidyasagar Bhagwanrao	7,146	1.35	
IND	4 Independent Candidates	9,974	1.89	
Majority		47,018	8.85	▲5.48
Turnout		5,47,336	58.92	▲5.74
INC gain from SS		Swing		

=== 1996 ===
1996 Indian general election: Osmanabad
Party	Candidate	Votes	%	±%
SS	Shivaji Kamble	198,521	42.06	
INC	Arvind Kamble	1,82,602	38.69	▼13.44
PWPI	Eknath Ghodke	62,078	13.15	▲4.36
AIIC(T)	Vinayak Yadavrao	698	0.15	
IND	17 Independent Candidates	28,115	5.94	
Majority		15,919	3.37	▼14.93
Turnout		4,87,084	53.18	▲0.76
SS gain from INC		Swing		

=== 1991 ===
1991 Indian general election: Osmanabad
Party	Candidate	Votes	%	±%
INC	Arvind Kamble	236,627	52.13	▼3.90
BJP	Vimal Mundada	1,53,572	33.83	
PWPI	Vidyasagar Bhagwanrao	39,898	8.79	▼13.98
IND	11 Independent Candidates	18,050	3.96	
OTH	3 Other Party Candidates	5,752	1.27	
Majority		83,055	18.30	▼14.96
Turnout		4,63,561	52.42	▼1.26
INC hold		Swing		

=== 1989 ===
1989 Indian general election: Osmanabad
Party	Candidate	Votes	%	±%
INC	Arvind Kamble	252,841	56.03	▲2.90
PWPI	Eknath Ghodke	1,02,749	22.77	
SS	Yeshwant Maruti	78,414	17.38	
IND	7 Independent Candidates	15,157	3.36	
OTH	2 Other Party Candidates	2,114	0.47	
Majority		1,50,092	33.26	▲18.85
Turnout		4,64,667	53.68	▼6.49
INC hold		Swing		

=== 1984 ===
1984 Indian general election: Osmanabad
Party	Candidate	Votes	%	±%
INC	Arvind Kamble	210,727	53.13	▲0.43
IC(S)	Tukaram Shrangare	1,53,599	38.72	
IND	Mohan Kamble	19,200	4.84	
IND	3 Independent Candidates	13,123	3.31	
Majority		57,128	14.41	▼14.00
Turnout		4,09,473	60.17	▲6.60
INC hold		Swing		

=== 1980 ===
1980 Indian general election: Osmanabad
Party	Candidate	Votes	%	±%
INC(I)	Sawant Trimbak	172,493	52.70	▼6.90
INC(U)	Tukaram Shrangare	79,510	24.29	
JP	Bharaskar Mahadeo	48,605	14.85	▼22.24
IND	Anivarya Bhadrayya	20,760	6.34	
IND	Sadashiv Libaji	5,949	1.82	
Majority		92,983	28.41	▲5.90
Turnout		3,38,425	53.57	▲3.86
INC(I) gain from INC		Swing		

=== 1977 ===
1977 Indian general election: Osmanabad
Party	Candidate	Votes	%	±%
INC	Tukaram Shrangare	162,934	59.60	▲1.94
JP	Kamlakarrao Rukmaji	1,01,390	37.09	
IND	N. D. Pagare	9,058	3.31	
Majority		61,544	22.51	▲4.04
Turnout		2,81,661	49.71	▼9.68
INC hold		Swing		

=== 1971 ===
1971 Indian general election: Osmanabad
Party	Candidate	Votes	%	±%
INC	Tulsiram Patil	178,391	57.66	▲7.38
PWPI	B. N. Deshmukh	1,21,246	39.19	
IND	Dnyandeo Kamble	4,449	1.44	
ABJS	Kishanrao Tarkase	3,069	0.99	▼6.26
IND	Namdeo Kamble	2,235	0.72	
Majority		57,145	18.47	▲10.66
Turnout		3,22,000	59.39	▼7.57
INC hold		Swing		

=== 1967 ===
1967 Indian general election: Osmanabad
Party	Candidate	Votes	%	±%
INC	Tulsiram Patil	162,146	50.28	▲0.72
RPI	H. N. Sonule	1,36,955	42.47	
ABJS	S. T. Patil	23,367	7.25	
Majority		25,191	7.81	▲2.57
Turnout		3,42,503	66.96	▲9.38
INC hold		Swing		

=== 1962 ===
1962 Indian general election: Osmanabad
Party	Candidate	Votes	%	±%
INC	Tulsiram Patil	117,060	49.56	▼3.13
PWPI	Udharerao Saheb Rao	1,04,686	44.32	▼2.99
IND	Revappa Krishna Mane	14,463	6.12	
Majority		12,374	5.24	▼0.14
Turnout		2,48,876	57.58	▲7.09
INC hold		Swing		

=== 1957 ===
1957 Indian general election: Osmanabad
Party	Candidate	Votes	%	±%
INC	Venkat Shrinivas Rao	94,772	52.69	▲0.34
PWPI	Uddavrao Sahebrao	85,085	47.31	▼0.34
Majority		9,687	5.38	▲0.68
Turnout		1,79,857	50.49	▼1.40
INC hold		Swing		

=== 1951 ===
1951 Indian general election: Osmanabad
Party	Candidate	Votes	%	±%
INC	Raghvendrarao Divan	101,573	52.35	
PWPI	Narsing Rao Balbim	92,470	47.65	
Majority		9,103	4.70	
Turnout		1,94,043	51.89	
INC win (new seat)				

== See also ==
- Osmanabad district
- Latur district
- Solapur district
- List of constituencies of the Lok Sabha
