= Pravin Virbhadrayya Swami =

Indian politician

Pravin Virbhadrayya Swami (born 1976) is an Indian politician from Maharashtra. He is an MLA from Umarga Assembly constituency, which is reserved for Scheduled Caste community, in Dharashiv district. He won the 2024 Maharashtra Legislative Assembly election representing the Shiv Sena (UBT).

== Early life and education ==
Swami is from Umarga, Dharashiv district, Maharashtra. He is the son of Virbhadrayya Gurupadaya Swami. He completed his M.A. in 2024 at Nashik. Earlier in 2022, he did his B.Sc., also at Nashik. In 1992, he completed his secondary school certificate examination at Bharat Vidyalay, Umarga. Before entering politics, he was a primary school teacher.

== Career ==
Swami won from Umarga Assembly constituency representing Shiva Sena (UBT) in the 2024 Maharashtra Legislative Assembly election. He polled 96,206 votes and defeated his nearest rival, Chougule Dnyanraj Dhondiram of Shiva Sena, by a margin of 3,965 votes.
