= Omerga Assembly constituency =

Constituency of the Maharashtra legislative assembly in India

Coordinates: 17.84°N 76.62°E

Umarga
- Constituency No. 240 for the Maharashtra Legislative Assembly

Constituency details
- Country: India
- Region: Western India
- State: Maharashtra
- District: Osmanabad
- Lok Sabha constituency: Osmanabad
- Established: 1952
- Total electors: 316,046
- Reservation: SC

Member of Legislative Assembly
- 15th Maharashtra Legislative Assembly
- Incumbent Pravin Swami
- Party: SS(UBT)
- Alliance: MVA
- Elected year: 2024

Umarga Assembly constituency (formerly Omerga) is one of the 288 Vidhan Sabha (legislative assembly) constituencies of Maharashtra state in western India.

== Overview ==
Umarga (constituency number 240) is one of the four Vidhan Sabha constituencies located in Dharashiv district. It covers the entire Lohara and Umarga tehsils of this district. It is reserved for the candidates belonging to the Scheduled Castes. The number of electors in 2009 was 266,557 (male 140,491, female 126,066).

Umarga is part of Dharashiv Lok Sabha constituency along with five other Vidhan Sabha constituencies, namely Paranda, Tuljapur and Dharashiv in Osmanabad district, Barshi in the Solapur district and Ausa in Latur district.

== Members of the Legislative Assembly ==
Election	Member	Party
1952	Gandhi Phoolchand	Indian National Congress
1957	Vishwambhar Namdeo	Indian National Congress
1962	Vijaysing Shivram	Peasants and Workers Party of India
1967	Bhaskarrao Shivram Pant Chalukya	Indian National Congress
1972	Bhaskarrao Shivram Pant Chalukya	Indian National Congress
1978	Bhaskarrao Shivram Pant Chalukya	Indian National Congress
1980	Rajaram Premnath Patil	Indian National Congress
1985	Kazi Abdul Khalek A. Kadar	Indian National Congress
1990	Kazi Abdul Khalek A. Kadar	Indian National Congress
1995	Ravindra Gaikwad	Shiv Sena
1999	Basavraj Madhavrao Patil	Indian National Congress
2004	Ravindra Gaikwad	Shiv Sena
2009	Dnyanraj Chougule	Shiv Sena
2014	Dnyanraj Chougule	Shiv Sena
2019	Dnyanraj Chougule	Shiv Sena
2024	Pravin Virbhadrayya Swami	Shiv Sena (UBT)

== Election results ==
=== Assembly Election 2024 ===
2024 Maharashtra Legislative Assembly election : Umarga
Party	Candidate	Votes	%	±%
SS(UBT)	Pravin Virbhadrayya Swami	96,206	48.97%	New
SS	Dnyanraj Dhondiram Chougule	92,241	46.96%	▼4.74
VBA	Ram Saida Gaikwad	4,087	2.08%	▼2.37
NOTA	None of the above	1,330	0.68%	▼0.17
Margin of victory		3,965	2.02%	▼13.22
Turnout		197,773	62.58%	▲5.74
Total valid votes		196,443		
Registered electors		316,046		▲6.12
SS(UBT) gain from SS		Swing	▼2.73	

=== Assembly Election 2019 ===
2019 Maharashtra Legislative Assembly election : Umarga
Party	Candidate	Votes	%	±%
SS	Dnyanraj Dhondiram Chougule	86,773	51.70%	▲11.41
INC	Bhalerao Dattu Rohidas	61,187	36.46%	▲8.81
MNS	Jalindar Shravan Kokane	7,835	4.67%	▲3.77
VBA	Ramakant Laxman Gaikwad	7,476	4.45%	New
NOTA	None of the above	1,425	0.85%	▲0.10
BSP	Gaikwad Tanaji Vaijanath	1,199	0.71%	▼0.33
Margin of victory		25,586	15.24%	▲2.61
Turnout		169,274	56.84%	▼0.84
Total valid votes		167,837		
Registered electors		297,829		▲5.20
SS hold		Swing	▲11.41	

=== Assembly Election 2014 ===
2014 Maharashtra Legislative Assembly election : Umarga
Party	Candidate	Votes	%	±%
SS	Dnyanraj Dhondiram Chougule	65,178	40.29%	▼4.50
INC	Kisan Nagnath Kamble	44,736	27.65%	▼10.60
BJP	Shinde Kailas Chintamanrao	30,521	18.86%	New
NCP	Dr. Gaikwad Sanjay Atmaram	15,569	9.62%	New
BSP	Datta Laxman Gaikwad	1,675	1.04%	▼0.07
MNS	Prof. Vijay Maruti Kshirsagar	1,459	0.90%	▼7.93
NOTA	None of the above	1,211	0.75%	New
Margin of victory		20,442	12.63%	▲6.09
Turnout		163,304	57.68%	▼1.65
Total valid votes		161,789		
Registered electors		283,117		▲6.21
SS hold		Swing	▼4.50	

=== Assembly Election 2009 ===
2009 Maharashtra Legislative Assembly election : Umarga
Party	Candidate	Votes	%	±%
SS	Dnyanraj Dhondiram Chougule	70,806	44.79%	▲1.43
INC	Dr. Gaikwad Baburao Pandurang	60,474	38.25%	▼3.39
MNS	Mhanttyya Kalyya Swami	13,954	8.83%	New
BBM	Ram Saida Gaikwad	2,062	1.30%	New
Independent	Prof. Dattatrya Krishnaji Kamble	1,823	1.15%	New
BSP	Prof. Dr. Umesh Shambhaji Murumkar	1,759	1.11%	▼0.30
RPI(A)	Popatrao Khanderao Sonkamble	1,720	1.09%	New
Independent	Prof. Mohan Kamble Gugalgaonkar	1,536	0.97%	New
Margin of victory		10,332	6.54%	▲4.82
Turnout		158,151	59.33%	▼11.16
Total valid votes		158,097		
Registered electors		266,557		▲26.49
SS hold		Swing	▲1.43	

=== Assembly Election 2004 ===
2004 Maharashtra Legislative Assembly election : Umarga
Party	Candidate	Votes	%	±%
SS	Ravindra Gaikwad	64,401	43.36%	▲7.33
INC	Basavraj Madhavrao Patil	61,848	41.64%	▼5.23
Independent	Baba alias Keshav Rajarambapu Patil	13,279	8.94%	New
Independent	Ram Saida Gaikwad	3,160	2.13%	New
BSP	Kamble Chandrakant Rajaram	2,094	1.41%	New
Hindustan Janta Party	Babu Vithoba Chavan	1,488	1.00%	▲0.59
Independent	Gaikwad Umaji Pandurang	912	0.61%	New
Margin of victory		2,553	1.72%	▼9.12
Turnout		148,532	70.49%	▼2.75
Total valid votes		148,520		
Registered electors		210,728		▲21.26
SS gain from INC		Swing	▼3.51	

=== Assembly Election 1999 ===
1999 Maharashtra Legislative Assembly election : Umarga
Party	Candidate	Votes	%	±%
INC	Basavraj Madhavrao Patil	56,245	46.87%	▲4.32
SS	Ravindra Gaikwad	43,232	36.03%	▼15.52
NCP	Baba alias Keshav Rajarambapu Patil	17,989	14.99%	New
Independent	Shivshankar Krishnaji Gaikwad	903	0.75%	New
Margin of victory		13,013	10.84%	▲1.84
Turnout		127,279	73.24%	▼5.29
Total valid votes		119,996		
Registered electors		173,785		▲0.70
INC gain from SS		Swing	▼4.68	

=== Assembly Election 1995 ===
1995 Maharashtra Legislative Assembly election : Umarga
Party	Candidate	Votes	%	±%
SS	Ravindra Gaikwad	68,343	51.55%	New
INC	Basavraj Madhavrao Patil	56,410	42.55%	▲5.38
BBM	Buwa Navnath Vishvanath	4,739	3.57%	New
JD	Bhanudas Tukaram Dhotre	987	0.74%	▼1.50
Margin of victory		11,933	9.00%	▼0.19
Turnout		135,525	78.53%	▲16.68
Total valid votes		132,580		
Registered electors		172,577		▲7.22
SS gain from INC		Swing	▲14.38	

=== Assembly Election 1990 ===
1990 Maharashtra Legislative Assembly election : Umarga
Party	Candidate	Votes	%	±%
INC	Kazi Abdul Khalek A. Kadar	36,277	37.17%	▼12.99
Independent	Balbhim Bhaurao Patil	27,310	27.98%	New
BJP	Ravindra Gaikwad	23,102	23.67%	New
Independent	Manikrao Hanmantrao Rathod	2,947	3.02%	New
JD	Sheshrao Madhavrao Mohite	2,190	2.24%	New
Independent	Narayan Ganapati Hakke	1,942	1.99%	New
Independent	Ronge Sadashivnagorao	1,519	1.56%	New
Independent	Daware Harish Mahadu	733	0.75%	New
Margin of victory		8,967	9.19%	▲6.63
Turnout		99,552	61.85%	▼3.67
Total valid votes		97,605		
Registered electors		160,956		▲27.08
INC hold		Swing	▼12.99	

=== Assembly Election 1985 ===
1985 Maharashtra Legislative Assembly election : Umarga
Party	Candidate	Votes	%	±%
INC	Kazi Abdul Khalek A. Kadar	40,925	50.16%	▲6.70
IC(S)	Birajdar Bhalchandra Ramrao	38,834	47.59%	▼6.68
Independent	Mohan Kamble	1,033	1.27%	New
Independent	Kamble Dnyandeo Bhivaji	805	0.99%	New
Margin of victory		2,091	2.56%	
Turnout		82,983	65.52%	
Total valid votes		81,597		
Registered electors		126,655		
INC gain from IC(S)		Swing	▼4.11	

=== Assembly By-election 1982 ===
1982 Maharashtra Legislative Assembly by-election : Umarga
Party	Candidate	Votes	%	±%
IC(S)	B. B. Ramrao	34,301	54.27%	New
INC	H. K. Vishwambhar	27,471	43.46%	New
Independent	B. M. Nivarti	656	1.04%	New
Independent	S. B. Bhimrao	545	0.86%	New
Total valid votes		63,210		
IC(S) gain from INC(U)		Swing	▼0.58	

=== Assembly Election 1980 ===
1980 Maharashtra Legislative Assembly election : Umarga
Party	Candidate	Votes	%	±%
INC(U)	Patil Rajaram Premnath	38,968	54.85%	New
INC(I)	Jagtap (Patil) Dattatraya Narsingrao	28,771	40.49%	New
BJP	Byale Vishwanath Shranappa	2,644	3.72%	New
Independent	Pawar Govind Sugrav	666	0.94%	New
Margin of victory		10,197	14.35%	▲6.73
Turnout		72,409	64.26%	▼8.04
Total valid votes		71,049		
Registered electors		112,684		▲4.74
INC(U) gain from INC		Swing	▲8.16	

=== Assembly Election 1978 ===
1978 Maharashtra Legislative Assembly election : Umarga
Party	Candidate	Votes	%	±%
INC	Chalukya Bhaskarrao Shivram Pant	35,327	46.69%	▼17.95
JP	Kasture Vishwanath Baslingappa	29,560	39.07%	New
Independent	Surwase Annarao Premnath	4,431	5.86%	New
PWPI	Mane Vinayakrao Balwantrao	3,369	4.45%	▼24.40
CPI	Belurkar Hanmant Yashwantrao	2,975	3.93%	New
Margin of victory		5,767	7.62%	▼28.17
Turnout		77,783	72.30%	▲11.37
Total valid votes		75,662		
Registered electors		107,585		▲17.17
INC hold		Swing	▼17.95	

=== Assembly Election 1972 ===
1972 Maharashtra Legislative Assembly election : Umarga
Party	Candidate	Votes	%	±%
INC	Bhaskarrao Chalukya	34,867	64.64%	▲11.16
PWPI	Vinaykraao Mane	15,562	28.85%	New
ABJS	Shantappa Varakale	2,133	3.95%	New
RPI	Sirsat Digamber Subhana	1,377	2.55%	New
Margin of victory		19,305	35.79%	▲23.85
Turnout		55,951	60.93%	▼8.22
Total valid votes		53,939		
Registered electors		91,823		▲14.04
INC hold		Swing	▲11.16	

=== Assembly Election 1967 ===
1967 Maharashtra Legislative Assembly election : Umarga
Party	Candidate	Votes	%	±%
INC	Bhaskarrao Chalukya	27,581	53.48%	▲9.83
CPI	H. Y. Belurkar	21,423	41.54%	New
Independent	K. M. Sonkamble	2,568	4.98%	New
Margin of victory		6,158	11.94%	▲9.80
Turnout		55,681	69.15%	▲6.74
Total valid votes		51,572		
Registered electors		80,520		▲16.03
INC gain from PWPI		Swing	▲7.69	

=== Assembly Election 1962 ===
1962 Maharashtra Legislative Assembly election : Umarga
Party	Candidate	Votes	%	±%
PWPI	Vijaysing Shivram	18,722	45.79%	New
INC	Tatayarao Madhavrao	17,846	43.65%	▼6.18
Independent	Sayabanna Mallappa	2,925	7.15%	New
PSP	Baswanappa Ersangappa	1,391	3.40%	New
Margin of victory		876	2.14%	▼17.79
Turnout		43,312	62.41%	▲8.41
Total valid votes		40,884		
Registered electors		69,398		▲18.94
PWPI gain from INC		Swing	▼4.04	

=== Assembly Election 1957 ===
1957 Bombay State Legislative Assembly election : Umarga
Party	Candidate	Votes	%	±%
INC	Vishwambhar Namdeo	15,699	49.83%	▼4.67
CPI	Prabhakar Jiwadhan	9,419	29.90%	New
Independent	Annarao Sadashiv	6,388	20.28%	New
Margin of victory		6,280	19.93%	▼4.09
Turnout		31,506	54.00%	▼4.73
Total valid votes		31,506		
Registered electors		58,347		▲2.14
INC hold		Swing	▼4.67	

=== Assembly Election 1952 ===
1952 Hyderabad State Legislative Assembly election : Omerga
Party	Candidate	Votes	%	±%
INC	Gandhi Phoolchand	18,282	54.50%	New
PWPI	Sambhogir	10,223	30.47%	New
Independent	Nanasaheb	5,043	15.03%	New
Margin of victory		8,059	24.02%	
Turnout		33,548	58.73%	
Total valid votes		33,548		
Registered electors		57,124		
INC win (new seat)				

== See also ==
- List of constituencies of Maharashtra Vidhan Sabha
- Umarga
