= Arvind Kamble =

Indian politician

Arvind Tulsiram Kamble (28 February 1952 – 29 December 2009) was an Indian politician who was a member of 8th Lok Sabha from Osmanabad (Lok Sabha constituency) in Maharashtra, India. He was elected to 9th, 10th and 12th Lok Sabha from Osmanabad. Kamble died from swine flu on 29 December 2009, at the age of 57.
