= Lakha, Maharashtra =

Village in India

Lakha
- Village
- Location in Maharashtra, India Lakha (India)
- Coordinates: 18.601274°N 75.993349°E
- Country: India
- State: Maharashtra
- District: Beed
- Tehsil: Kaij

Government
  - Type: Grampanchayat
  - Body: Grampanchayat of Lakha

Area
  - Total: 710.51 ha (1,755.7 acres)

Population (2011)
  - Total: 1,241
  - Density: 174.7/km^{2} (452.4/sq mi)

Languages
  - Official: Marathi
  - Other spoken: Urdu
- Time zone: UTC+5:30 (IST)
- PIN: 431123
- Telephone code: 02445
- ISO 3166 code: IN-MH
- Vehicle registration: MH-23
- Nearest Cities: Kalamb, Kaij

Lakha is a village in the Kaij tehsil of Beed district in the state of Maharashtra, India. The village is administrated by a sarpanch who is an elected representative of village according to the Constitution of India and the Panchayati raj in India.

== Location ==
Lakha village is located on the border of Osmanabad and Beed districts, on the right (south) bank of the Manjara River, just west of the Manjara Dam Reservoir.
