= Murder of Santosh Deshmukh =

2024 torture and killing in India

The Santosh Deshmukh murder case concerns the abduction, torture, and murder of Santosh Deshmukh, the sarpanch of Massajog village in Beed district, Maharashtra, India, on 9 December 2024. The case, linked to an extortion attempt on the Mumbai-based wind power company Avaada and involving politically connected individuals, caused controversy in Maharashtra. The Maharashtra Criminal Investigation Department (CID) filed a 1,400-page chargesheet against eight suspects, including Walmik Karad, a close aide of Nationalist Congress Party (NCP) leader Dhananjay Munde. Munde subsequently resigned as a cabinet minister due to public pressure.

== Background ==
Santosh Deshmukh, aged 45, was the sarpanch of Massajog village in Kaij taluka, Beed district, and a member of the Maratha community. He had opposed alleged extortion attempts targeting Avaada, a Mumbai-based green energy company with a windmill project in Massajog. While the village has seen economic growth from wind energy projects, the development has also led to crimes such as extortion and kidnapping.

On 6 December 2024, a clash broke out at Avaada's project site when suspects, including Sudarshan Ghule, allegedly attacked a security guard and the project manager. Deshmukh intervened, leading to a confrontation with the attackers that was filmed and shared online. This incident reportedly heightened tensions, which culminated in Deshmukh’s murder three days later.

=== Motive ===
The alleged motive for the attack was revenge for the violent ambush of two gang members by 12–15 villagers led by Deshmukh. The attackers claimed that Deshmukh had brought them disrepute by ambushing one of their gang member 'Pratik Ghule' on his birthday and beating him with sticks. Then Santosh Deshmukh, who claimed to be the victim, further circulated videos of the incident, which went viral damaging the gang's image, also as a reason for the killing.

== Murder ==
On 9 December 2024, Santosh Deshmukh was abducted in broad daylight near the Dongaon toll plaza by six men in a black Scorpio SUV. He was reportedly tortured for nearly three hours before being killed; his body was later found by the roadside near Daithana Shivar. According to the autopsy report, Deshmukh sustained 56 injuries caused by both blunt and sharp objects, including a 41-inch gas cylinder pipe, iron rods, wooden sticks, and knuckle dusters. The cause of death was determined to be haemorrhage and shock resulting from multiple injuries.

The CID recovered 15 videos and eight photographs taken by the suspects during the torture, depicting Deshmukh being beaten, stripped, and humiliated. In one video, a suspect is allegedly seen urinating on Deshmukh while he is bleeding severely. The recordings, ranging from 5 seconds to 2 minutes in length, were captured between 3:46 pm and 5:53 pm on 9 December and are believed to have been intended as a warning to others who might resist extortion.

== Investigation ==
The Government of Maharashtra transferred the case to the CID, which established a Special Investigation Team (SIT) led by Deputy Inspector General Basavaraj Teli. Three First information report (FIRs) were filed at Kaij police station: one for murder, one for a ₹2 crore extortion attempt against Avaada, and one under the Maharashtra Control of Organised Crime Act, 1999 (MCOCA). On 27 February 2025, the CID filed a 1,400-page chargesheet naming eight suspects: Walmik Karad, Sudarshan Ghule, Vishnu Chate, Jairam Chate, Mahesh Kedar, Siddhartha Sonawane, Sudhir Sangale, and Pratik Ghule.

Walmik Karad, a local strongman and associate of NCP leader Dhananjay Munde, was named as the mastermind. Karad, who had 15 prior criminal cases, allegedly ordered the murder after Deshmukh resisted extortion. Sudarshan Ghule, with 10 prior cases, was a key figure in the attack. Karad surrendered on 31 December 2024, but another suspect, Krushna Andhale, remained on the run as of February 2025.

The investigation revealed that the suspects had a history of violent crimes, including attempted murder and extortion. The chargesheet linked the murder to the extortion plot, supported by call records and recovered weapons. Chief Minister of Maharashtra Devendra Fadnavis also ordered a judicial probe into the case.

== Political controversy ==
The case caused a political uproar in Maharashtra, with the opposition Maha Vikas Aghadi (MVA) accusing the Mahayuti government of failing to maintain law and order. Walmik Karad’s ties to Dhananjay Munde, a minister in the Fadnavis ministry, led to calls for Munde's resignation. The opposition claimed Munde's influence shielded Karad, an allegation Munde denied. Videos and photos of Deshmukh's torture, which circulated online in March 2025, fueled public anger, leading Munde to resign as Minister of Food, Civil Supplies, and Consumer Protection on 4 March 2025.

The case also stirred caste tensions in Beed, as Deshmukh was a Maratha and Karad, along with several suspects, was from the Vanjari community, an Other Backward Class (OBC) group. This exacerbated Maratha–OBC conflicts, which were already heightened by ongoing Maratha reservation protests in the region. Social activist Anjali Damania called for the trial to be moved to Mumbai and the suspects to be held in Arthur Road Jail, citing alleged police collusion in Beed.

== Public response ==
The murder sparked protests in Beed, with villagers and Deshmukh's family demanding justice. On 25 February 2025, Massajog residents held a hunger strike to express dissatisfaction with the investigation. They demanded the arrest of Krushna Andhale, a probe into police officers Prashant Mahajan and Rajesh Patil, and the appointment of senior advocate Ujjwal Nikam as special public prosecutor. The government appointed Nikam to the role on 26 February 2025. Deshmukh's brother, Dhananjay Deshmukh, opposed bail for the suspects, fearing evidence tampering.

Political leaders across parties condemned the murder. Shiv Sena (UBT) leader Aaditya Thackeray criticized the government’s delay in acting against Munde, while NCP (SP) leader Supriya Sule called for a thorough probe. Maratha quota activist Manoj Jarange and INC leaders also supported the call for justice.

== Legal proceedings ==
The trial is underway in a special MCOCA court in Beed, with Ujjwal Nikam serving as the special public prosecutor. The chargesheet includes evidence such as weapons, mobile phone videos, and witness statements. The suspects face charges under the Bharatiya Nyaya Sanhita for murder, kidnapping, and extortion, as well as MCOCA provisions for organized crime. As of June 2025, the trial continues, with seven of the eight suspects in custody.
