= Chaklamba =

Village in Maharashtra

Chaklamba is a village based in the Georai taluka of Beed district of the state of Maharashtra. It falls under the Marathawada region in the division of Aurangabad. The village was in the news when villagers had constantly undertaken relay hunger strikes to press for a sub-canal from Jayakwadi to their villages, where the average rainfall in the 2018 monsoon was just about 300 millimeter. Nearly two decades ago, the largest local water resource collapsed which caused severe depletion of groundwater. A few showers of water were sufficed for an average crop that season. But the area's water crisis looked set to deepen in the long run. As per the survey of GSDA, more than half the villages where it found depletion by over 3 meters from the five-year average are in Marathwada (1,467 villages). As per the villagers, bore-wells and wells were offering muddy water and they were still filling up with plastic drums for their daily needs.

== Demographic ==
The pincode of the village is 431130 with Sub Office Umapur and Head Office Beed. The latitude 18.96 and longitude 72.82 are the geocoordinate of the Chaklamba. The villagers here are mostly dependent on the irrigation of rabi crops and other farming. The native language of village is Marathi and most of the village people speak Marathi.

== Population ==
According to Census 2011, the village location code is 559282. The overall area of Chaklamba village is 3353.00 hectares with 1390 numbers of households. The village has total population of 6748 persons in which 3519 are males and 3229 females. The population in the age group of 0-6 is 981 in which 539 are males and 442 are females. The total literates here are 4067. The village has 14 Scheduled Tribes & 489 Scheduled Castes.

== Geography ==
It is estimated that nearly 10,000-strong population of Chaklamba, 7,000 migrated annually for the sugarcane harvest, working as labourers. There is no business for local shops or businesses; there is no work on local farms anyway. In fact, the residents have petitioned the Water Resources Department of the Maharashtra government multiple times. Some of the largest land-owners are now working as a temp with a government company.

== Surrounding ==
The nearby villages are Rasulabad, Mahandula, Dhumegaon, Shekta, Matori. It is surrounded by Shevgaon Taluka towards the west, Georai Taluka towards the east, Pathardi Taluka towards the west, Paithan Taluka towards the north. The nearby cities are Paithan, Pathardi, Aurangabad, Manjlegaon.
