= Khardewadi =

Village in Maharashtra

Khardewadi is a village place situated near Nandurphata in Beed district of Maharashtra state. There is a bus stop "Khardewadi" on the road which connect Beed city, the district place to Kaij, a tehsil place.
