= Beed Custard Apple =

Type of Custard apple variety from Maharashtra, India

Beed Custard Apple (बीड सीताफळ)
- Geographical indication
- Description: Beed Custard Apple is a custard apple variety cultivated in Maharashtra
- Type: Custard Apple
- Area: Beed district
- Country: India
- Registered: 31 May 2016
- Official website: ipindia.gov.in

Beed Custard Apple is a variety of custard apple mainly grown in the Indian State of Maharashtra. It is a common and widely cultivated crop in Ashti, Kaij, Dharur, Manjarsumba, Ambajogai and the Balaghat Range of Beed district in Marathwada region.

Under its Geographical Indication tag, it is referred to as "Beed Custard Apple".

== Name ==
Beed Custard Apple is a prized crop in Beed district and so named after it. Locally it is called Sitaphal - the origin of the name can be traced back to Sanskrit language, where "sheeth" means "cold" and "phal" means "fruit".

== Description ==
The Beed custard apple, known for its sweet taste, has been a gift from the Balaghat ranges to the Beed district for over four centuries. The high potassium content and micronutrients in the rocky terrain's shallow, gravelly, well-drained soil in Balaghat ranges, particularly around Dharur, Ambajogai, and Ashti, contribute to the distinct taste of Beed custard apples.

The sweetness of Beed custard apples is due to their high Total Sugar (20.12%) and reducing sugar content (17.97%), which is higher than other varieties like Mammoth (16.6%) and Washington (15.7%). The climate in Ambajogai and Dharur, with hot and dry temperatures and low rainfall, is favourable for custard apple production, with a yield of 10.89 kg/Plant.

The key features to identify Beed custard apples are their round shape, shiny green external fruit colour, pleasant texture and flavour, and creamy white or yellowish colour of the pulp's wide spaces, visible upon maturity.

== Geographical indication ==
It was awarded the Geographical Indication (GI) status tag from the Geographical Indications Registry, under the Union Government of India, on 31 May 2016 valid up to 25 August 2024.

Balaghat Sitaphal Sangh from Dharur, proposed the GI registration of Beed Custard Apple. After filing the application in August 2014, the Custard Apple was granted the GI tag in 2016 by the Geographical Indications Registry in Chennai, making the name "Beed Custard Apple" exclusive to the Custard Apple grown in the region. It thus became the first Custard Apple variety from India and the 19th type of goods from Maharashtra to earn the GI tag.

The prestigious GI tag, awarded by the GI registry, certifies that a product possesses distinct qualities, adheres to traditional production methods, and has earned a reputation rooted in its geographical origin.

== See also ==
- Dagdi Jowar of Jalna
- Borsuri Tur Dal
