= Kolpi Pimpari =

Village in Maharashtra

- village
- Location in Maharashtra, India Kolpi Pimpari (India)
- Coordinates: 18.96°N 72.82°E
- Country: India
- State: Maharashtra
- District: Beed

Languages
  - Official: Marathi
- Time zone: UTC+5:30 (IST)

Kolpi Pimpari is a village in Dharur block, Beed District in Maharashtra
