= Sonesangavi =

Village in Maharashtra

- Village
- Location in Maharashtra, India
- Coordinates: 18°59′53″N 76°06′56″E
- Country: India
- State: Maharashtra
- District: Beed

Government
  - Type: Gram Panchayat
  - Sarpanch: Mukund Kanse

Population (2011)
  - Total: 1,384

Languages
  - Official: Marathi
- Time zone: UTC+5:30 (IST)
- Postal code: 431123
- ISO 3166 code: IN-MH
- Vehicle registration: MH44(Ambajogai), MH23(Beed)
- Website: maharashtra.gov.in

Sonesangavi is a village in Beed district, Maharashtra, India. It is situated 17 km away from sub-district headquarter Kaij and 76 km away from district headquarter Beed. It belongs to Marathwada region and Aurangabad division. Its altitude is 674 meters above sea level. As of 2009, Sonesangavi is the gram panchayat of Sonesangavi village.

There is no railway station near Sonesangavi in less than 53 km (Dhoki) & 60 km (Parli). Other railway stations near to village are Kalamb Road, Thair, and Murud. Sonesangavi is surrounded by Dharur Taluka towards North, Kalamb Taluka towards South, Wadwani Taluka towards North, Ambajogai Taluka towards East. This Place is in the border of the Beed District and Osmanabad District.

The total population of the village is about 1,384 (2011) among which 738 are male. The number of households in the village is around 327.

== History ==
Sonesangavi was a single village situated in the region where now there is now Manjara Dam built. After the Manjara Dam was built, Sonesangavi was divided into two parts, Sonesangavi-1 in the west and Sonesangavi-2 in the east.

== See also ==
- Beed
- Maharashtra
- Kalamb, Osmanabad
- Kaij
- Marathwada
