= Yewta =

Village in Maharashtra

- village
- Interactive map of Yewta
- Coordinates: 18.803600°N 75.992556°E
- Country: India
- State: Maharashtra
- District: Beed

Languages
  - Official: Marathi
- Time zone: UTC+5:30 (IST)
- Vehicle registration: MH-
- Coastline: 0 kilometres (0 mi)

Yewta (also known as Yevta) is a small village within Kaij sub-district, Beed district in the Indian state of Maharashtra. Yewta derives from the temple of lord Yewteshwara situated in the village.

== Demographics ==
As of the 2011 census, the village had 715 households and 3545 inhabitants.

== Description ==
It is a planned residential village situated among hills. Its temples include Vithal Rukhmini, Yewteshwar (Shankar), Balaji, Maruti Par, Munjya, Khandoba, Janai Devi, Narsoba, and Jotiba.

== Infrastructure ==
A dam was constructed during 1970-1972 for rain water storage.

== Education ==
Zila Parishad high school (Govt School) teaches up to 10th standard. It is one of the oldest Zila Parishad high school in Beed.
