= Baburao Narsingrao Kokate (Adaskar) =

Indian politician

- In office 1980–1986

Member of the Maharashtra Legislative Assembly for Kaij
- In office 1972–1978
- Preceded by: Sundarrao Solanke
- Succeeded by: Satpute Bhaguji Nivartti

Member of the Maharashtra Legislative Assembly for Chausala
- In office 1978–1980
- Preceded by: Sonaji Kshirsagar
- Succeeded by: Chandmal Rajmal Lodha

Personal details
- Party: Indian National Congress
- Children: Rameshrao Baburao Kokate (Adaskar) Meghraj Baburao Kokate (Adaskar)

Baburao Narsingrao Kokate (Adaskar) (died 2016) was an Indian politician from Maharashtra and a member of the Indian National Congress. He was elected in 1972 as a member of the Legislative Assembly of Maharashtra from Kaij and also in 1978 from Chausala constituency in Beed district.
