= Devthana =

Village in Maharashtra

- Village
- Location within Maharashtra Location within India Location within Asia
- Coordinates: 18.944270°N 76.301851°E
- Country: India
- State: Maharashtra
- Region: Marathwada
- Division: Aurangabad
- District: Beed
- Taluka: Dharur

Government
  - Type: Grampanchayat
  - Body: Gram Panchayat devthana

Population (2011)
  - Total: 1,100
- Demonym: Devthanakar

Languages
  - Official: Marathi
- Time zone: UTC+5:30 (IST)
- PIN: 431131
- Vehicle registration: MH-23; MH-44
- Lok Sabha: Beed (Lok Sabha constituency)
- Vidhan Sabha: Majalgaon (Vidhan Sabha constituency)

Devthana is a village located in Dharur tehsil of Beed district. It belongs to Majalgaon constituency of Maharashtra legislative assembly.

== Administration ==
As per Constitution of India and Panchayat Raj Act, Devthana village is administered by Sarpanch and 9 members of Gram Panchayat under Dharur Panchayat Samiti and Beed Zilla Parishad.

== Demographics ==
Devthana Population figures as of 2011 Census of India

Particulars	Total	Male	Female
Total No. Of Houses	250	-	-
Population	1147	613	534
Child (0-6)	168	100	68
Schedule Cast	193	100	93
Schedule Tribe	0	0	0
Literacy	70.89%	77.97%	63.09%
Total Workers	609	345	264
Main Workers	450	0	0
Marginal Workers	159	10	149
Source: Census of India

== Education ==
1. Zilla Parishad School, Devthana

2. Maharashtra Vidyalaya, Moha (9 km)

3. Indira Gandhi Highschool, Dindrud (10 km)

4. Yogeshvari Nutan Vidyalaya, Amabajogai (30 km)

5. SRT Mahavidyalaya, Ambajogai (30 km)

== Transport ==
◆Nearest Railway Station - Parli Vaijnath (30 km away)

◆Nearest Airport - Aurangabad (195 km away)

== Important Government Offices ==
◆ Tehsil office, Dharur (40 km away)

◆ Deputy Collector SDM office, Majalgaon (40 km away)

◆ Collector DM Office, Beed (70 km away)

◆ Police Station, Sirsala (10 km away)

◆ Panchayat Samiti, Dharur

== Temples ==
●Dakshinmukhi Hanuman Mandir, Devthana

●Lonari Devi Mandir, Devthana

●Vitthal Mandir, Devthana

●Vaijnath Jyotirling Mandir, Parli Vaijnat (30 km)

●Mahadeo Mandir, Tapovan (10 km)

●Yogeshvari Devi Mandir, Ambajogai (30 km)

== Hospitals ==
• Swami Ramanand Tirth Government Medical Hospital, Ambajogai (30 km)

== Banks ==
◆ State Bank of India, Parli Vaijnat (30 km)

◆ Maharashtra Gramin Bank, Moha (10 km)

◆ HDFC Bank, Parli Vaijnath (30 km)

◆ Ambajogai People's Bank, Sirsala (10 km)

== Sugar Factory ==
• Sundarrao Solanke Sahakari Sakhar Karkhana, Sundarnagar, Telgaon (20 km away)

== Important Family ==
■ Solanke

== Important Place ==
• The Solanke Family Gadhi- old residence of Ranoji Rao Solanke

== See also ==
1. Sundarrao Solanke

2. Prakashdada Solanke
