= Kalamb, Osmanabad =

Kalamb
- town
- Location in Maharashtra, India
- Coordinates: 18°34′27″N 76°01′18″E
- Country: India
- State: Maharashtra
- District: Osmanabad
- Elevation: 628 m (2,060 ft)

Population (2011)
  - Total: 217,687
- Demonym: Kalambkar

Languages
  - Official: Marathi
- Time zone: UTC+5:30 (IST)
- PIN: 413507
- Telephone code: 02473
- ISO 3166 code: IN-MH
- Vehicle registration: MH25
- Website: maharashtra.gov.in

Kalamb is a town with a municipal council in Osmanabad district in the Indian state of Maharashtra. Administratively it is part of and headquarters for the Kalamb Tehsil.

== Geography ==
Kalamb is located on the right (south) bank of the Manjara River, just west of the Manjara Dam Reservoir. It has an elevation of 647 metres (2,123 ft).

== Demographics ==
In the 2011 India census, Kalamb had a population of 217,687. Males constituted 52.6% of the population and females 47.4%. Kalamb had an average literacy rate of 73.7%, higher than the national average of 64%: male literacy was 78%, and female literacy was 68%. In 2011 in Kalamb, 13.7% of the population was under 6 years of age.

== See also ==
- Beed
- Maharashtra
- Sonesangavi
- Osmanabad
- Latur
