= Kokate =

Kokate is a surname. People with the surname include:

- Manikrao Kokate
- Abhijit Kokate
- Baburao Narsingrao Kokate (Adaskar)
