= Dharur, Beed =

Dharur Kille Dharur
- city
- Location in Maharashtra, India
- Coordinates: 18.82°N 76.12°E
- Country: India
- State: Maharashtra
- District: Beed
- Elevation: 739 m (2,425 ft)

Population (2001)
  - Total: 18,350
- Demonym: Dharurkar

Languages
  - Official: Marathi
- Time zone: UTC+5:30 (IST)
- PIN: 431124

Dharur is a city and a municipal council in Beed district in the state of Maharashtra, India. Dharur, also known as Kille Dharur (किल्ले धारूर), derives its name and historical significance from the prominent fort located in the town. The fort has played a vital role in shaping the town's history and economy. The distance between Ambajogai (city of temples) and Dharur is approximately 42 kilometers (26 miles) by road. The travel time typically ranges from 1 to 1.5 hours, depending on the route and traffic conditions.

== Dharur Fort ==
Dharur Fort, also known as Mahadurga, is a historic fort located in Dharur, a town in Beed district, Maharashtra, India. The fort holds significant historical importance and reflects the architectural and cultural influences of various dynasties that ruled the region.

== History ==
The origins of Dharur Fort date back to the Rashtrakuta period (8th–10th centuries), during which it was originally constructed and known as "Mahadurga." Rashtrakuta king Govinda III (793–814 AD) mentioned Dharur in one of his grant deeds, highlighting its early prominence. The fortifications of this era were built using simple stone stacking techniques also known as Rock balancing.

Over time, the Chalukyas of Kalyani and the Yadavas of Devagiri controlled the fort and surrounding region. During the Bahmani Sultanate, Dharur evolved into a flourishing trading center, owing to its strategic location on the trade routes.

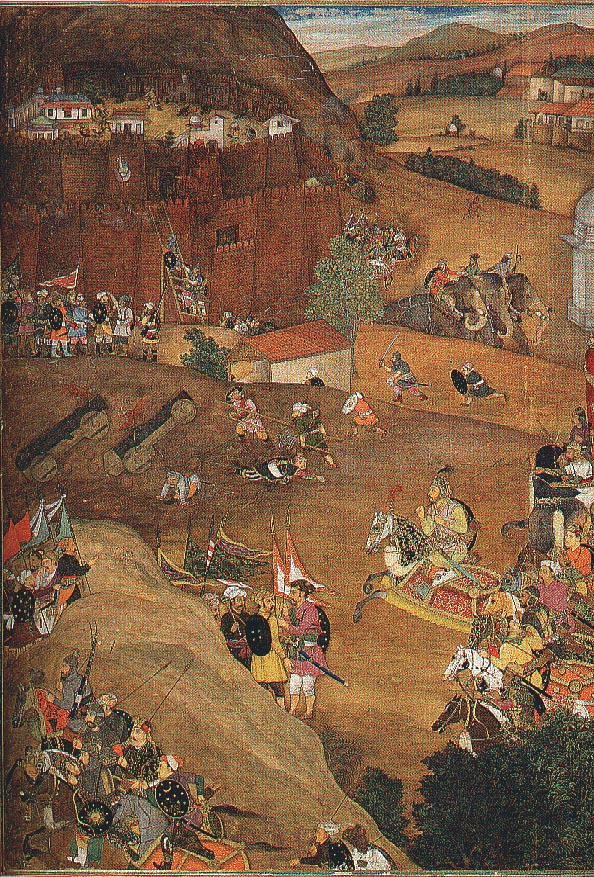
A'zam Khan captures Fort Dharur (January 1631)

In 1567 AD, Kishwar Khan Lari, a prominent commander of the Adil Shahi dynasty i.e. Sultanate of Bijapur, reconstructed the fort using the stones from the original Mahadurga. This fortified structure stands today as Dharur Fort. However, it became a contested site between the Adil Shahi and Nizam Shahi dynasties. In 1569 AD, Murtaza Nizam Shah of Ahmednagar captured the fort, renaming it Fatehbad. This is how Muslim kings changed Hindu names of city.

The fort later came under Mughal control during the reign of Emperor Shah Jahan in 1630–31 AD. It remained a vital stronghold, with a mint established at the fort to produce coins for about 100 years. During the 18th century, the fort also witnessed episodes involving Maratha leaders such as Netaji Palkar and was briefly under Maratha control following the Battle of Kharda in 1795.

Following India's independence, Dharur Fort was under the Nizam of Hyderabad until the merger of Hyderabad State with India. After the Hyderabad Liberation Movement in 1948, Dharur, along with the rest of the Hyderabad State, was integrated into India. Following the reorganization of states in 1960, it became part of Maharashtra.

== Nearby attractions ==
Dharur Fort is surrounded by several significant landmarks, which can be visited in a day:

- Ambajogai - Temple city
- Ancient Kedareshwar Temple
- Dharmapuri Fort - Dharmapuri is a Village in Parli Vaijnath Taluka in Beed District of Maharashtra State.
- Caves near Dharur

These sites collectively offer insight into the region's rich cultural and historical heritage.

== Geography ==
Kille Dharur (Dharur) is located at 18.82°N 76.12°E. It has an average elevation of 739 metres (2424 feet).

== Demographics ==
As of 2001 India census, Dharur had a population of 18,350. Males constitute 52% of the population and females 48%. Kille Dharur has an average literacy rate of 65%, higher than the national average of 59.5%: male literacy is 74% and, female literacy is 55%. In Dharur, 15% of the population is under 6 years of age.

== See also ==
- Beed
- Maharashtra
- Kalamb, Osmanabad
- Sonesangavi
- Ambajogai
- Kaij
