= Kankaleshwar Temple =

Coordinates: 18°59′16″N 75°46′05″E

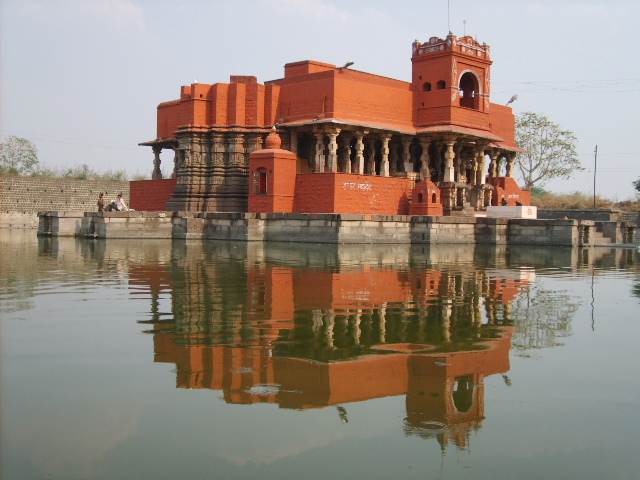

Religion
- Affiliation: Hinduism
- Deity: Shiva

Location
- Location: Beed
- Interactive map of Kankaleshwar Temple

Kankaleshwar Temple is a temple located in the town of Beed, in the Indian state of Maharashtra.

== History ==
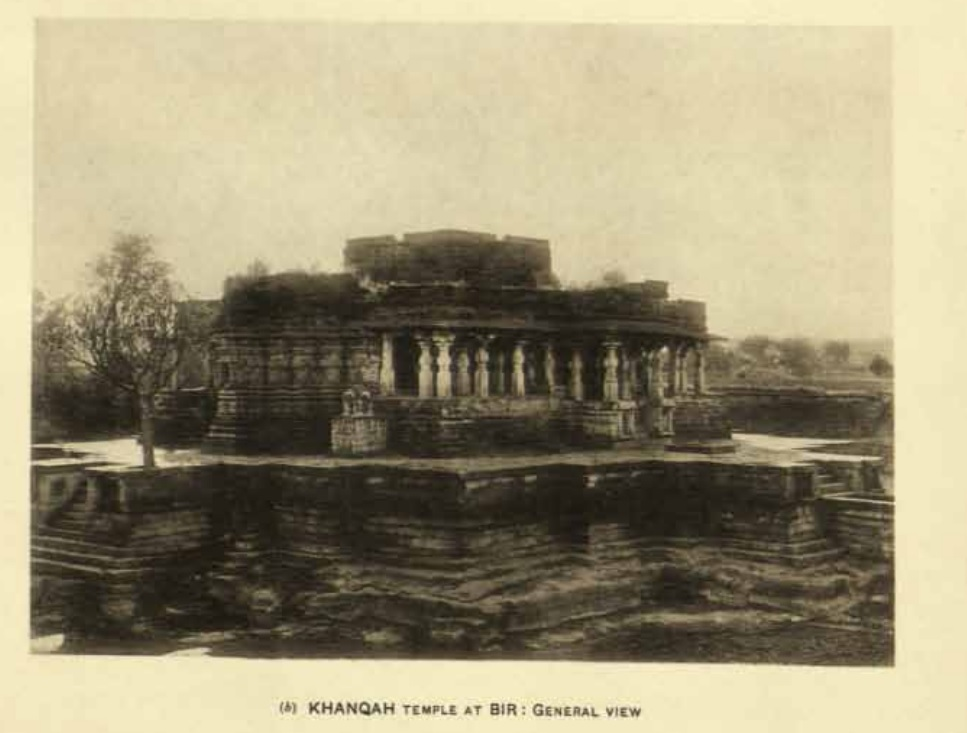
Kankaleshwar Temple, c. 1920s

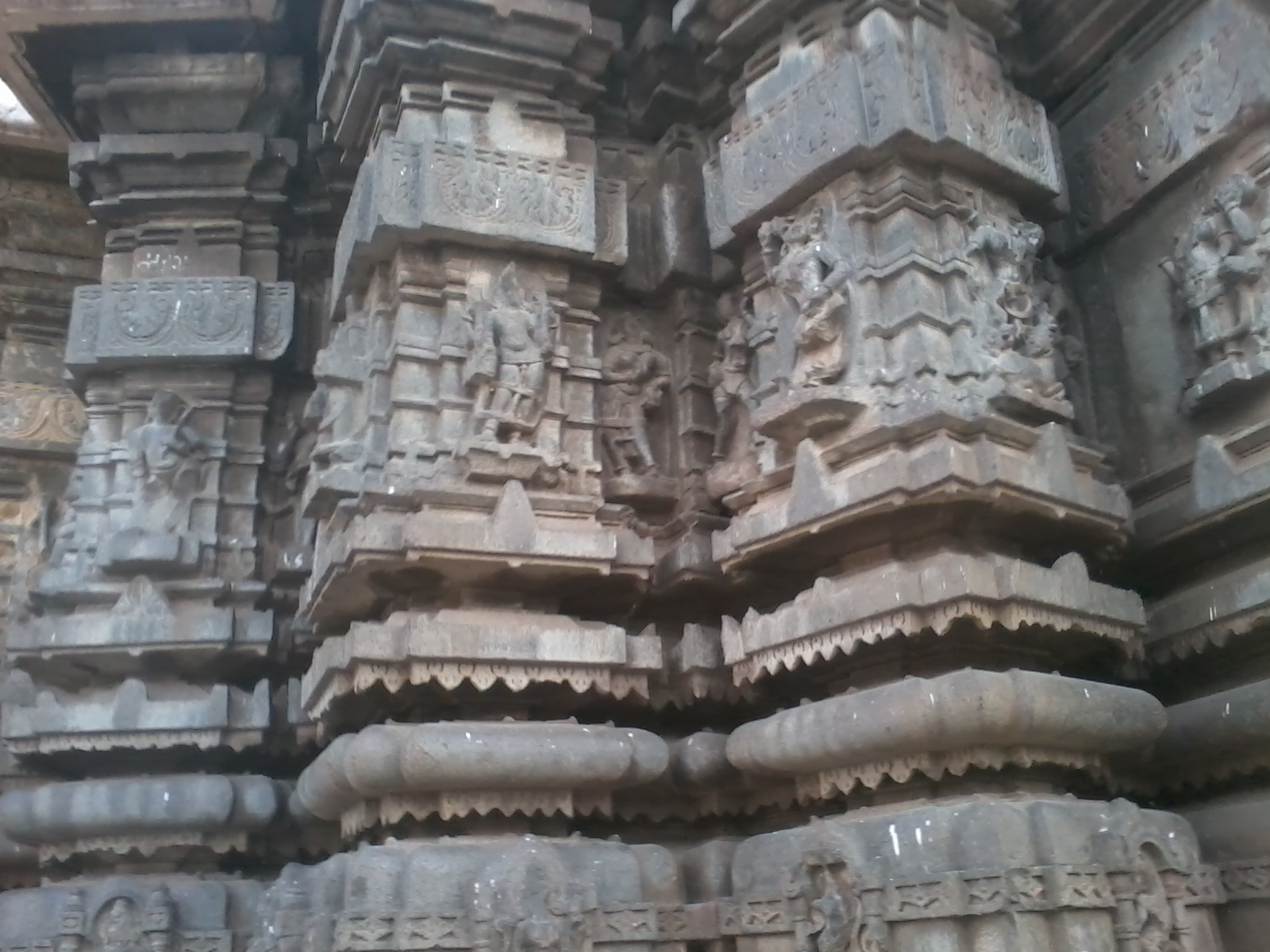
Carvings

The temple bears no inscription, and therefore the exact date of its erection is unknown. However, from the style of its construction, it was probably built between the 10th and 12th centuries.

Firishta mentions the locality of the temple as a site where a battle between a Hindu and Muslim kingdom took place. The temple fell into the hands of the Muslim kingdom, however, they made no changes to the structure except for the construction of a parapet wall on the roof. The Muslims would utilize the roof for their prayers, while the lower portion remained in possession of the Hindus. The temple was known as the Khanqah temple, or Khanqah Deval, during this period.

== Description ==
The temple is located in the middle of a tank. The tank, square in shape, has a pavement running along its sides. The temple is to be approached by a causeway which leads to a flight of steps, leading to the temple building.

The building is star-shaped, with elaborate carvings of Hindu gods and goddesses arranged in niches.

The roof is domical-shaped, and is supported by 24 pillars.
