= Rebalance Earth =

British infrastructure investment company

Rebalance Earth is a United Kingdom based infrastructure investment company that operates in the field of landscape investment. It develops financial structures related to ecosystem services, biodiversity, and land and water management, and works with institutional investors and landholders.

== History ==
Rebalance Earth was founded in the early 2020s in the United Kingdom. The company was established amid growing interest in incorporating environmental assets and ecosystem services into financial and investment frameworks. In its early years, the company focused on developing methods for measuring and monetising ecosystem services, including carbon storage, water regulation, and biodiversity conservation. Its activities included pilot projects and research related to environmental monitoring and valuation.

Rebalance Earth developed investment structures based on what it described as “nature-based infrastructure,” including wetlands, river catchments, and coastal ecosystems. These projects were designed to generate revenue through long-term contracts linked to environmental outcomes. During the mid-2020s, the company received minority investment from institutional sources, including the West Yorkshire Pension Fund. This investment supported the creation of dedicated natural capital portfolios.
