= Talwat Borgaon =

Village in India

Talwat Borgaon is a village in Georai, Tahasil i.e. Taluka in Beed district. It is situated near NH-211 Highway i.e. Solapur-Dhule from state Maharashtra.
