= WRAS =

WRAS may mean:

- WRAS (FM) 88.5, college radio station at Georgia State University in Atlanta, Georgia, United States
- Water Regulations Advisory Scheme conformance mark in the United Kingdom
