= Mahadula Municipal Council =

Municipal Council in Nagpur, Maharashtra

Rajesh Rangari

Type
- Type: Municipal Council of the Mahadula

Leadership
- Mayor: Rajesh Rangari, Bharatiya Janata Party
- Seats: 17

Elections
- Last election: 29-January-2019

Website
- www.rajeshrangari.com

Mahadula is the Municipal council in district of Nagpur, Maharashtra.

== History ==
Mahadula is a Municipal Council and town in district of Nagpur, Maharashtra. The Mahadula Census Town has population of 21,481 of which 11,145 are males while 10,336 are females as per report released by Census India 2011.

== Municipal Council election ==
=== Electoral performance 2019 ===
S.No.	Party name	Party flag or symbol	No. of Corporators
01	Shiv Sena (SS)		00
02	Bharatiya Janata Party (BJP)		11
03	Indian National Congress (INC)		04
04	Nationalist Congress Party (NCP)		00
05	Bahujan Samaj Party		01
08	Independent		01
