= Santosh Deshmukh =

Indian sarpanch (1980–2024)

- Born: 1980
- Died: December 9, 2024 (aged 43–44); Near Daithana Phata, Beed district, Maharashtra, India
- Occupation: Sarpanch
- Known for: Rural development initiatives, opposition to extortion
- Spouse: Ashwini Deshmukh
- Children: 2

Santosh Deshmukh (1980 – 9 December 2024) was the Sarpanch of Massajog village in Beed district, Maharashtra, India. He was known for contributions to rural development and actively opposing local extortion activities. His murder in December 2024 attracted widespread media coverage and led to extensive investigations.

== Achievements ==
As sarpanch, Santosh helped Massajog village win 19 awards. The village was recognized for its excellent water supply and sanitation systems in the region.

== Murder ==
On 9 December 2024, Deshmukh was abducted by six men from the Dongaon toll plaza and forcibly taken in an SUV to a remote location. Deshmukh was subjected to torture from approximately 3:30 p.m. to 6:00 p.m. The assailants used various weapons, including a 41-inch gas pipe with a handle, iron rods tied with clutch wires, wooden sticks, and sharp-edged weapons described as a "fighter" and a "dharkatti".

The assailants recorded fifteen videos and took eight photographs during the incident. These recordings depict Deshmukh being physically assaulted, humiliated, and forced to chant slogans praising one of the attackers. One of the videos also captures an assailant urinating on the victim.

Deshmukh was later discovered unconscious by police at Daithna Shivar near Nandur Ghat Road. He was transported to a hospital, where he was pronounced dead upon arrival. His body showed signs of extensive physical trauma consistent with severe assault.

=== Motive ===
The motive of the attackers was "revenge for the violent ambush that was made on their 2 gang members" by 12-15 villagers headed by Deshmukh. The murderers claimed that Deshmukh caused them disrepute by ambushing one of their gang member (Pratik Ghule) and beating him with sticks on his birthday; and subsequently sharing videos of the incident making it go viral causing the gang's image to be tarnished.

Initial police investigations indicated the murder might be linked to an extortion scheme for and amount of 2 Crores targeting renewable energy firm Avaada Energy, active in the area. Deshmukh had reportedly become an obstacle to the extortionists.

=== Investigation ===
The Criminal Investigation Department (CID) filed a chargesheet revealing the attackers recorded several videos during the murder, suggesting a deliberate act of intimidation. Investigations uncovered a wider conspiracy involving multiple suspects, including Valmik Karad, who reportedly had political connections.

A Special Investigation Team (SIT) was formed by the Maharashtra government to probe deeper. By March 2025, authorities had arrested seven suspects, while one remained at large.

=== Aftermath ===
Following the arrest of who was identified as a close associate, Maharashtra's Minister of Food and Civil Supplies faced intense political pressure. Munde resigned from his ministerial position on 4 March 2025.
