= Khandoba Temple, Beed =

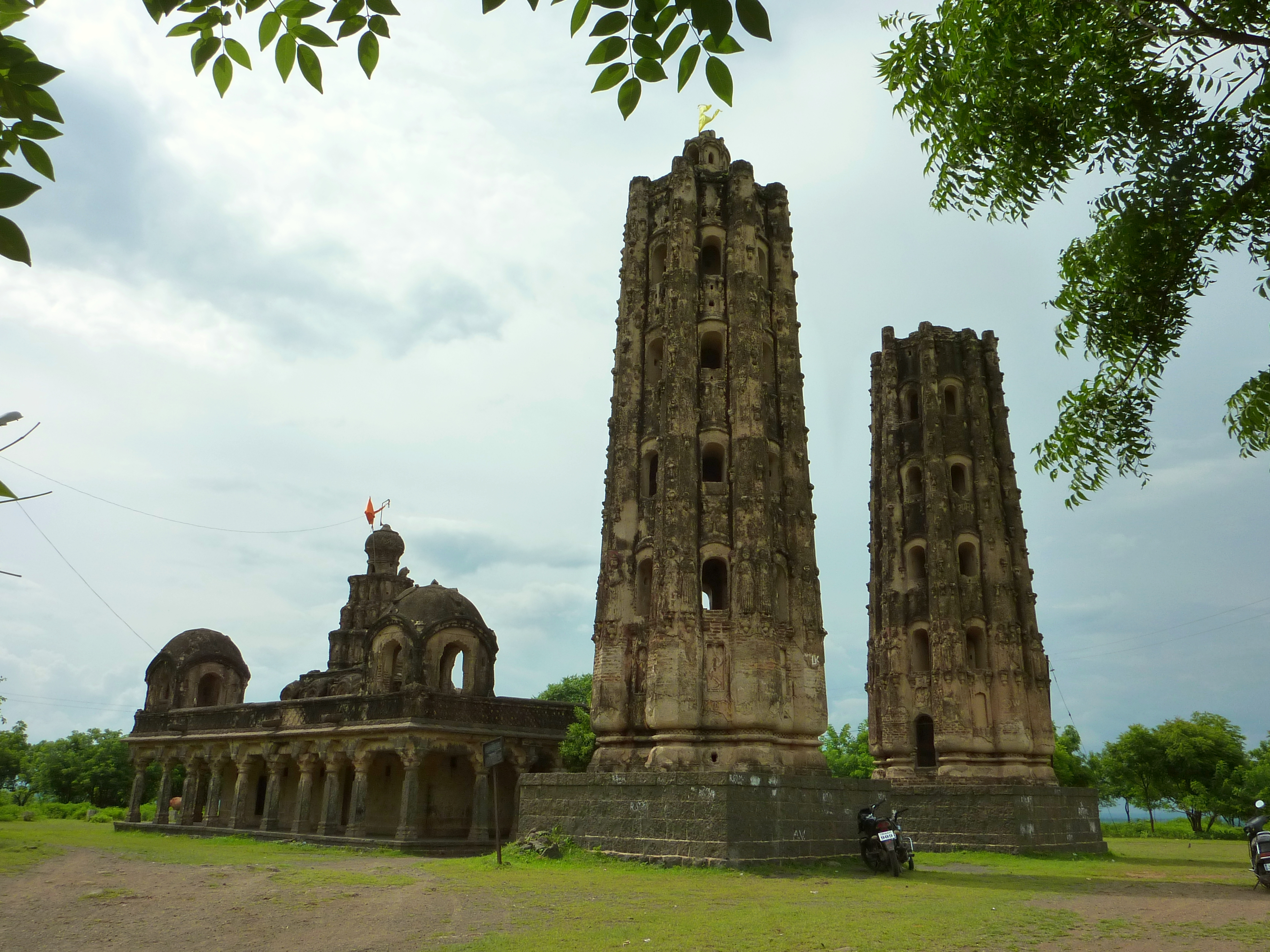

Religion
- Affiliation: Hinduism

Location
- Location: Beed, Maharashtra
- Geographic coordinates: 19.0043895°N 75.7736951°E

Khandoba Temple, Beed is a Hindu temple located in the town of Beed, in the Indian state of Maharashtra.

== History ==
The temple does not bear any inscription, but from the style of the temple, it appears to be a 17th-century construction.

== Description ==
=== Temple building ===
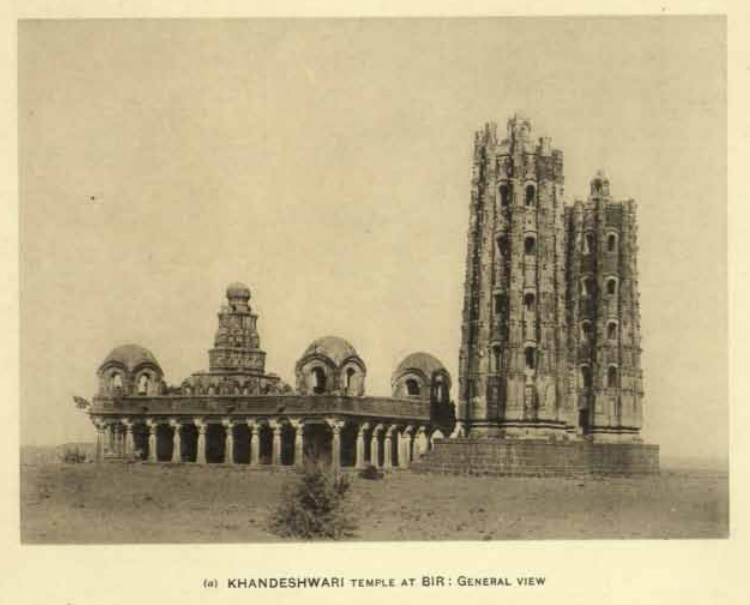
Khandeshwari Temple at Bir

The temple building consists of galleries on three sides, with the garbhagriha (sanctum) on the fourth. The door of the sanctum has an image of Ganesha on its lintel. The main deity of the temple, however, has been lost and only a detached sculpture, depicting a man and woman riding on a horse, survives in the sanctum.

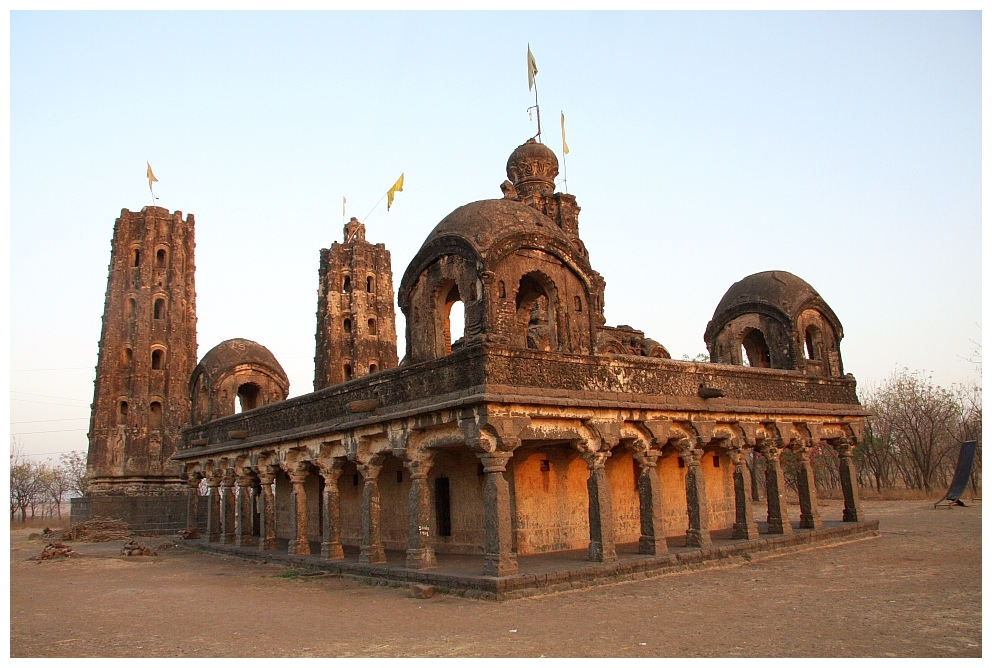
Khandoba Temple

The temple is surmounted by a spire built in the Hemadpanti style. On the corners of the roof are curvilinear pavilions.

=== Dipadans ===
Two dipadans (lamp-towers) are situated east of the temple. The towers have a height of 45 feet. They are octagonal in shape, while their bases are square. A narrow staircase is located within each tower. They are five-storied, with arched openings at each storey. The exterior of the towers are embellished with stucco work.
