= Patoda =

- City
- Interactive map of Patoda
- Country: India
- maharashtra: Maharashtra
- District: Dharashiv

Government
  - Body: Nagar Panchayat

Population (2019)
  - Total: 25,000

Languages
  - Official: Marathi
- Time zone: UTC+5:30 (IST)
- Postal code: 414204
- Literacy: 95%%
- Lok Sabha constituency: Beed
- Vidhan Sabha constituency: Ashti Patoda Shirur (K.)
- CIVIL AGENCY: NAGAR PANCHAYAT
- Climate: dry (Köppen)
- Website: gppatoda.com

Patoda is a tehsil in Beed subdivision of Beed district, Maharashtra state, India. Patoda has historical and cultural importance, and it lies amidst other places of interest to tourists.

== Features ==
Paramount Solar Park is a solar energy park in Patoda. It is the largest private-sector solar park approved by the Solar Energy Corporation of India (SECI) under the Jawaharlal Nehru National Solar Mission in India. The park is spread over 2,600 acres (11 km^{2}). The park is proposed to have a capacity of 500 MW. Maharashtra has received bids for tariffs of Rs 4.42 per kWh in 2016, and it is expected the rates will decrease by the time K. P. Power – Paramount Solar Park is completed. It has Asia's first peacock sanctuary established in Naygaon. Also there is a famous waterfall at Sautada in Patoda Taluka.

== See also ==
- Ultra Mega Solar Power Projects
- Solar Energy Corporation of India
- Ministry of New and Renewable Energy
- Jawaharlal Nehru National Solar Mission
