= Khajana Bawdi =

Well near Beed, Maharashtra, India

Khajana Bawdi or Khajana Vihir is a historical well located 6 km from Beed on the Beed–Solapur Highway. Constructed between 1572 – 1583 CE during the rule of Salabat Khan of the Ahmadnagar Sultanate, it was designed by the architect and geologist Raja Bhaskar for the purpose of irrigation. The well measures 12.60 meters in diameter and 7.40 meters in depth. Inside the structure, a circular veranda is built 17 feet above ground level, and beneath this verandah lies six-foot-deep well. Even after 435 years, it stands intact and continues to irrigate about 500 acres of land without the use of any power. An Urdu inscription is also carved on the inner wall of the well.

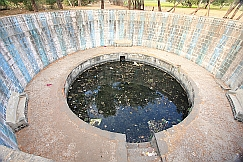
