= Mohammad Nubairshah Shaikh =

Indian chess player (born 1998)

Personal information
- Born: 1 January 1998 (age 28) Beed, Maharashtra, India

Chess career
- Country: India
- Title: International Master (2016)
- FIDE rating: 2387 (September 2026)
- Peak rating: 2461 (September 2022)

Mohammad Nubairshah Shaikh (born 1 January 1998) is an Indian chess player who holds the title of International Master (IM) awarded by FIDE in 2016. He won the inaugural 1st SAARC Chess Championship (Open) in 2019, held in Bangladesh and successfully defended the title in 2023.

In 2018, he received the Shiv Chhatrapati Sports State Award from the Government of Maharashtra, the highest state-level honor for sports personality in the state.

== Early life and education ==
Nubairshah Shaikh was born in Beed, Maharashtra, India and completed his graduation in civil engineering from Mumbai University in 2019.

Shaikh showed outstanding promise as a chess prodigy from a young age. In January 2011, he gained national attention at the 3rd Chennai International Open, where, at the age of 13, he earned his first International Master norm, becoming the youngest player from Maharashtra at the time to achieve an IM norm, remaining unbeaten against five Grandmasters and defeating GM S.P. Sethuraman during the event. This early achievement laid the foundation for his progress toward the International Master title, which he was officially awarded by FIDE in 2016.

== Chess career ==
He later completed his second IM norm at the Qatar Masters Open 2015, one of World's strongest open events, and secured his third and final IM norm at the Abu Dhabi Masters 2016, following which the title was officially approved by FIDE.

After becoming International Master, In 2017 Shaikh claimed the title of Commonwealth Junior Champion. In 2018 Shaikh won the gold medal in the Western Asia Junior Blitz Championship in Uzbekistan.

Before the COVID-19 pandemic, Shaikh achieved two grandmaster norms. Nubairshah earned his first norm at the Delhi GM Open 2018, where his performance rating was 2647, and a second norm the Capelle La Grande 2020 tournament in France.

The pandemic paused his tournament play in 2021.

In 2022, he won the Silver Lake Open in Serbia, narrowly missing his final Grandmaster norm. Shaikh achieved his final Grandmaster norm & Elect GM Title at the Bangladesh Premier League 2024, where he played for Titas Club, winning the Board Prize with a score of 8/10.

In 2023, Shaikh successfully defended his title at the South Asian Chess Championship (SACC) held in Lalitpur, Nepal, becoming the first player to win the SAARC Championship multiple times. Shaikh won the Jaffna International Chess Championship 2024 in Sri Lanka with a score of 9/10.

Shaikh won the 16th Vaujany International Festival 2025 with an unbeaten 7/9 score, defeating defending champion IM Thibault Dudognon in the final round. Shaikh also won the 29th Creon IM Round-Robin Closed 2025 in France with an unbeaten 6.5/9 score, finishing half a point ahead of IM Simon Lamaze and FM Ewen Pichon. Shaikh scored 9/10 to win the Silver Jubilee Queenstar Rating Open 2025.

=== Recent successes at speed chess ===
In late 2025, Shaikh recorded successes on the Indian rapid circuit, winning both The Grandeur 8.0 Rapid Rating Open and the Satish Anna Rapid Rating Open 2025. He scored 8/9 in each event, securing first place with 7 wins and 2 draws and reaffirming his status as one of the most consistent rapid performers in the country.

In January 2026, Shaikh continued his strong form by winning the 4th KTBS Rapid Rating Open with a score of 8.5/9, defeating three International Masters during the tournament.

=== Recognition and titles ===
Shaikh was awarded the title of International Master (IM) in 2016, and in 2018 received the Shiv Chhatrapati Sports State Award by the Government of Maharashtra for his significant contributions to chess in India. In 2025, he was awarded the FIDE Trainer (FT) title by the International Chess Federation for his contributions to chess coaching and training.

=== Notable tournament results ===
Year	Tournament	Result
2007	Asian School Championship 2007 (Boys U-9)	Gold Medal
2008	4th World Schools Chess Championships 2008 (Open U-11)	Silver Medal
2010	FIDE World Amateur Chess Championship 2010	Bronze Medal
2014	Asian Youth Chess Championship 2014 (Open U-16 Rapid)	Gold Medal
2017	Commonwealth Junior Championship 2017	Gold Medal
2018	Western Asia Junior Blitz Championship 2018	Gold Medal
2019	1st SAARC Open Chess Championship 2019	Gold Medal
2022	Silver Lake Open 2022	1st place
2023	South Asian Chess Championship 2023 (SACC)	Gold Medal
2024	2nd Jaffna International Chess Championship	1st place
2025	16th Vaujany International Festival	1st place
2025	29th Creon IM Round-Robin Closed	1st place
2025	Silver Jubilee Queenstar Rating Open	1st place

== Personal life ==
Outside of chess, Shaikh works as a civil engineer with the Maharashtra government's Public Works Department. He has balanced his professional engineering career with chess, a combination that has drawn attention in chess circles.

== Notable games ==
- Nubairshah Shaikh vs Gukesh D, Qatar Masters 2023. Shaikh drew against Gukesh D. the India No. 1, who would go on to become the 18th World Chess Champion in 2024.
- Nubairshah Shaikh vs Hikaru Nakamura – Titled Tuesday, January 2020. Shaikh defeated Hikaru Nakamura, the World No. 3
- Nubairshah Shaikh vs Arjun Erigaisi, ChessKid Cup 2023. Shaikh won against Erigaisi, another rising star in Indian chess.
