= Hatkarwadi, Maharashtra =

Village in Maharashtra

Hatkarwadi
- Interactive map of Hatkarwadi
- Coordinates: 18.0264251°N 75.6477552°E
- Country: India
- State: Maharashtra
- Region: Marathwada
- Division: Aurangabad
- District: Beed
- Taluka: Shirur

Government
  - Type: Grampanchayat

Area
  - Total: 164 ha (410 acres)

Population (2011)
  - Total: 2,000
- Demonym: Hatkarwadikar
- PIN code: 414205
- Official Language: Marathi

Hatkarwadi is a village located in the Shirur taluka of Beed district in the Indian state of Maharashtra. The village comes under Marathwada region of Aurangabad division. It is a sprawling sun-baked district which has been affected by lack of rain. Not long ago, more than 1,200 people lived in its 125 squat homes. The scorching summer has ruined the life out of Hatkarwadi. The earth is brown and cracked. Only two of the 35 wells have some water left.

== Geography ==
Hatkarwadi village stands deserted as most of the villagers have migrated in search of water and almost the entire village is empty. The village hand-pumps and wells having gone dry, the villagers have had no other option but to migrate. The prime source of living for the villagers is agriculture and the rearing of animals and crops. It includes millets; maize and cotton are grown here. Due to the crisis of water has everything has interrupted.

== Migration ==
Hatkarwadi had been deserted with only 10-15 families remaining out of a population of more than 2,000. As per the Census of 2011 by the Govt. of India, the village was covered in the area of 164 hectares. It had 76 households in which total 363 persons were living, 178 were males and 185 were females. That time, village had total 255 literates and 108 were illiterates.

== Education ==
Hatkarwadi has a primary school, with classes up to 4th, only has a handful of students.

== Demographic ==
The people of the village mostly speak Marathi and Hindi to communicate. The village falls under the assembly constituency of Beed. Hatkarwadi PIN code is 414205 and postal head office is Rajuri Navgan.

== Nearest areas ==
The nearby villages or towns are:

- Sangalwadi
- Karegaon
- Wadzari
- Pimpalgaon Dhas
- Raimoha with Shirur (Ka ) Taluka towards North
- Beed Taluka towards East
- Jamkhed Taluka towards South
- Ashti Taluka towards west
