= Shirur Kasar =

Shirur Kasar Shirur Kasar
- town
- Nickname: Shirur
- Country: India
- State: Maharashtra
- District: Beed

Languages marathi
  - Official: Marathi
- Time zone: UTC+5:30 (IST)
- Postal code: 413249
- Vehicle registration: MH-23 Population:- 9,723 (2021 census)
- Website: www.beed.nic.in

Shirur Kasar is a tehsil in the Beed subdivision of the Beed district, in the Indian state of Maharashtra. The town is situated on the southern bank of the river Sindafana, a tributary of the Godavari River. Shirur Kasar obtained Tehsil status in 1999. Before this, it was a part of the Patoda tehsil, which is also in the Beed district. The town has grown steadily since gaining administrative importance.

== Geography and Location ==
The tehsil is situated in a semi-arid region of Maharashtra, with the Sindafana River playing a crucial role in supporting the agricultural activities in the area. The river is a significant water source, contributing to the farming and daily life of the residents.

== Economy ==
Agriculture forms the backbone of Shirur Kasar’s economy. The region primarily produces crops such as cotton, sorghum, and millet, alongside various fruits and vegetables. Traditional methods are used alongside modern farming techniques. Weekly markets are held where local produce is traded, contributing to the town's economy.

== Media and Communication ==
One of the well-known local newspapers is Weekly Rashtra Nirman, Also Satet Newspaper Include Lokmat, Sakal, Maharashtra Times, The Hindu. which serves as a popular source of news and information for the community. It highlights issues relevant to the region, including agriculture, politics, and social events.

== Villages ==
Shirur Kasar tehsil is home to several villages, each contributing to the region's cultural and agricultural landscape. Some of the key villages include:

- Kolwadi
- Khalapuri
- Gomalwada
- Shindfana (Hingewadi)
- Rakshas Bhuwan
- Vighanwadi
- Kholewadi
- Loni
- Manur
- Warni
- Bavi
- Padali
- Jamb
- Dhokwad

These villages are vital to the local economy, with farming being the primary occupation for most residents. Additionally, the region is known for its local festivals and community events, which reflect the rich cultural traditions of rural Maharashtra.

== Administrative and Political Structure ==
Shirur Kasar functions under the administrative framework of the Beed district. Since gaining tehsil status in 1999, the area has seen improved governance, with local administrative offices managing the region’s developmental needs. The tehsil is governed by a Tehsildar, who oversees local administration, land records, and revenue collection.

Shirur Kasar Taluka mainly Came Under Ashti Vidhansabha Constituency but Some Villages Under Beed Constituency And 39 Beed Loksabha

- MLA - Suresh R Dhas (Ashti Constituency)
- MLA - Sandip R Kshirsagar (Beed Constituency)
- MP - Bajarang Sonavane (Beed Loksabha)

== Transport and Connectivity ==
Shirur Kasar is connected by road to the nearby towns and cities of Beed district. State-run buses and private vehicles form the main modes of transport. Railway:-

Well connected Through newly opened Beed-Ahilyanagar Rail Route nearest Station is 

- Vighanwadi
- Raimoha
- Jatnandur

  linking the tehsil to major markets and administrative centers. 

The proximity to the Sindafana River has also facilitated some irrigation projects in the area.other sources of Irrigation

- Uthala Dam
- Gomalwada dam
- Poundul Dam
- Phulsangavi Dam
