= Kalamb taluka =

Kalamb Tahsil
- tehsil
- Location in Maharashtra, India
- Coordinates: 18°31′N 076°00′E
- Country: India
- State: Maharashtra
- District: Osmanabad
- Tahsil: Kalamb

Area
  - Total: 957.05 km^{2} (369.52 sq mi)

Population
  - Total: 217,687
  - Density: 227.46/km^{2} (589.11/sq mi)

Languages
  - Official: Marathi
- Time zone: UTC+5:30 (IST)
- ISO 3166 code: IN-MH
- Lok Sabha constituency: Osmanabad
- Vidhan Sabha constituency: Osmanabad
- Website: maharashtra.gov.in

Kalamb (Kalamb Tehsil) is one of eight tehsils in the Osmanabad district in the state of Maharashtra, India. Headquarters for the tehsil is the town of Kalamb. There are ninety-one panchayat villages in the Kalamb Tehsil.

== Geography ==
Kalamb Tehsil borders Beed District to the north across the Manjira River; to the east is Latur District; to the south is Osmanabad Tehsil, to the southwest is Solapur District; and Washi Tehsil is to the west.

== Demographics ==
In the 2001 India census, Kalamb Tehsil had a population of 188,237 with 97,529 males (51.8%) and 90,708 females (48.2%), for a gender ratio of 930 females per thousand males.

In the 2011 Indian census, Kalamb Tehsil was recorded with 219,711 inhabitants.

== Towns and settlements ==
- Kasbe Tadawale
