= Maharashtra Water Resources Regulatory Authority =

State water resources department in Maharashtra, India

Maharashtra Water Resources Regulatory Authority महाराष्ट्र जलसंपत्ती नियामक प्राधिकरण
- Company type: Public Sector
- Industry: Independent Water Regulatory Agency
- Founded: August 2005
- Headquarters: World Trade Center Mumbai, Maharashtra, India
- Area served: Maharashtra
- Key people: (Chairman),
- Products: Water, Water resource management, Water Regulations Advisory, Bulk Water Tariff, Water Conflict Resolution, Criteria for Bulk Water Entitlement, Water Regulation Plus, Maharashtra Centre for Innovation, Progressive Regulation & Awareness in Water
- Parent: Government of Maharashtra
- Website: www.mwrra.org

Maharashtra Water Resources Regulatory Authority (MWRRA) is a Government of Maharashtra initiative. Administrative and legal reforms which constitute broadly what is known as the Water Sector Reforms. The institute is responsible for regulation, allocation, management and utilisation of limited water resources in state. The MWRRA is authorised to control and set water tariffs. All water regulation projects are abide to have clearance from MWRRA. This projects could be from Irrigation, Industrial users and Urban & Rural domestic consumers.

This state level ‘independent’ water regulatory authority was established by Maharashtra Water Resources Regulatory Authority Act, 2005. This is a significant change in the institutional framework for water regulation. While MWRRA does have some positive aspects, there are some downfalls in this as well.

- It allows the setting of tariffs on different bulk water users including industry and small-scale water users and farmers as well. This could lead to unfair pricing for water uses if they don't create an equal pricing breakdown.
- It has also introduced and implemented a tariff structure in which farmers in particular that have more than one child will have to pay higher prices for their water. It is a form of population control, which is unfair that the burden lies with the farmers while all of the urban dwellers are not forced to pay.
