= Wadwani =

Wadwani वडवणी
- Nagar Panchayat
- Location in Maharashtra, India
- Coordinates: 18°59′N 76°03′E
- Country: India
- State: Maharashtra
- District: Beed
- Tehsil: Wadwani
- Taluka status: December 1999

Government
  - Type: Nagar Panchayat
  - Body: Wadwani Nagar Panchayat
- Elevation: 462 m (1,516 ft)

Population (2011)
  - Total: 12,484

Languages
  - Official: Marathi
- Time zone: UTC+5:30 (IST)
- PIN: 431144
- Vehicle registration: MH-44, MH-23
- Website: beed.nic.in

Wadwani is a town and a tehsil (Taluka) in the Beed district of Maharashtra, India. It is part of the Majalgaon subdivision and is situated in the Marathwada region.

== History and Administration ==
Wadwani was officially designated as a Taluka in December 1999 by the then Deputy Chief Minister of Maharashtra, Gopinath Munde. The Taluka encompasses 40 villages and serves as a significant administrative hub in the district. It is represented by six Panchayat Samiti circles and three Zilla Parishad members.

Administratively, the town falls under the Majalgaon (Vidhan Sabha constituency) for state elections and the Beed (Lok Sabha constituency) for national parliamentary elections.

== Education ==
Wadwani is an emerging educational hub in the Beed district. The town is home to several primary, secondary, and higher education institutions, including:

- Sindhphana Madhyamik Vidyalaya
- Maharani Tarabai School
- Lokmanya Tilak College
- Vaishnavi College
- Government Industrial Training Institute (ITI)
- Sant Bhagwanbaba English School
- Bansidhar Munde English School

The town's connectivity was recently improved by its addition to the Central Railway zone network with the establishment of the Wadwani railway station.

== Places of Interest ==
The Wadwani Taluka contains several sites of historical and religious significance:

- Salimba: Located 5 km north of Wadwani, this village was impacted during the 1993 Latur earthquake. Structural remnants of affected houses remain visible in the village.
- Raja Harishchandra Pimpri: Notable for housing a temple dedicated to Harishchandra, which is considered rare in India.
- Chinchwan: Located 5 km from the town, it features a temple dedicated to Makardhwaja, the son of Hanuman.
- Mainda: Features a Lord Mahadev temple situated on a mountain shaped like the "OM" symbol.
- Chardari: Known for its ancient Hanuman temple.
- Religious Shrines: Other local landmarks include Kotharban (Satavai Devi Temple), Khadki (Khandoba Temple), and Rui Pimpla (Gorakshnath Mandir).
