= Chausala =

- city
- Location in Maharashtra, India
- Coordinates: 18.708692°N 75.691595°E
- Country: India
- State: Maharashtra
- District: Beed

Languages
  - Official: Marathi
- Time zone: UTC+5:30 (IST)
- PIN: 431126

Chausala is a small city in Beed district in Marathwada division in the Maharashtra state in India. It is located near the National HighWay 52. Its Coordinates are: 18.708692N 75.691595E .

Before the delimitation of constituency in 2008, Adyar was constituency number 2004 of Maharashtra Legislative Assembly between 1977–2004.
