= Mahadula =

- Census town
- Location in Maharashtra, India
- Coordinates: 21.4035°N 79.4246°E
- Country: India
- State: Maharashtra
- District: Nagpur

Population (2001)
  - Total: 18,246

Languages
  - Official: Marathi
- Time zone: UTC+5:30 (IST)

Mahadula is a census town in Nagpur district in the Indian state of Maharashtra.

== Demographics ==
As of 2001 India census, Mahadula had a population of 18,246. Males constitute 52% of the population and females 48%. Mahadula has an average literacy rate of 76%, higher than the national average of 59.5%: male literacy is 81%, and female literacy is 71%. In Mahadula, 12% of the population is under 6 years of age.

Year	Male	Female	Total Population	Change	Religion (%)							
Year	Male	Female	Total Population	Change	Hindu	Muslim	Christian	Sikhs	Buddhist	Jain	Other religions and persuasions	Religion not stated
2001	9432	8820	18252	-	67.379	4.274	0.855	0.099	27.115	0.268	0.011	0.000
2011	11145	10336	21481	17.691	65.998	4.399	0.396	0.233	28.555	0.247	0.047	0.126

== See also ==
- Mahadula Municipal Council
