= Custard apple =

List of plants with similar names

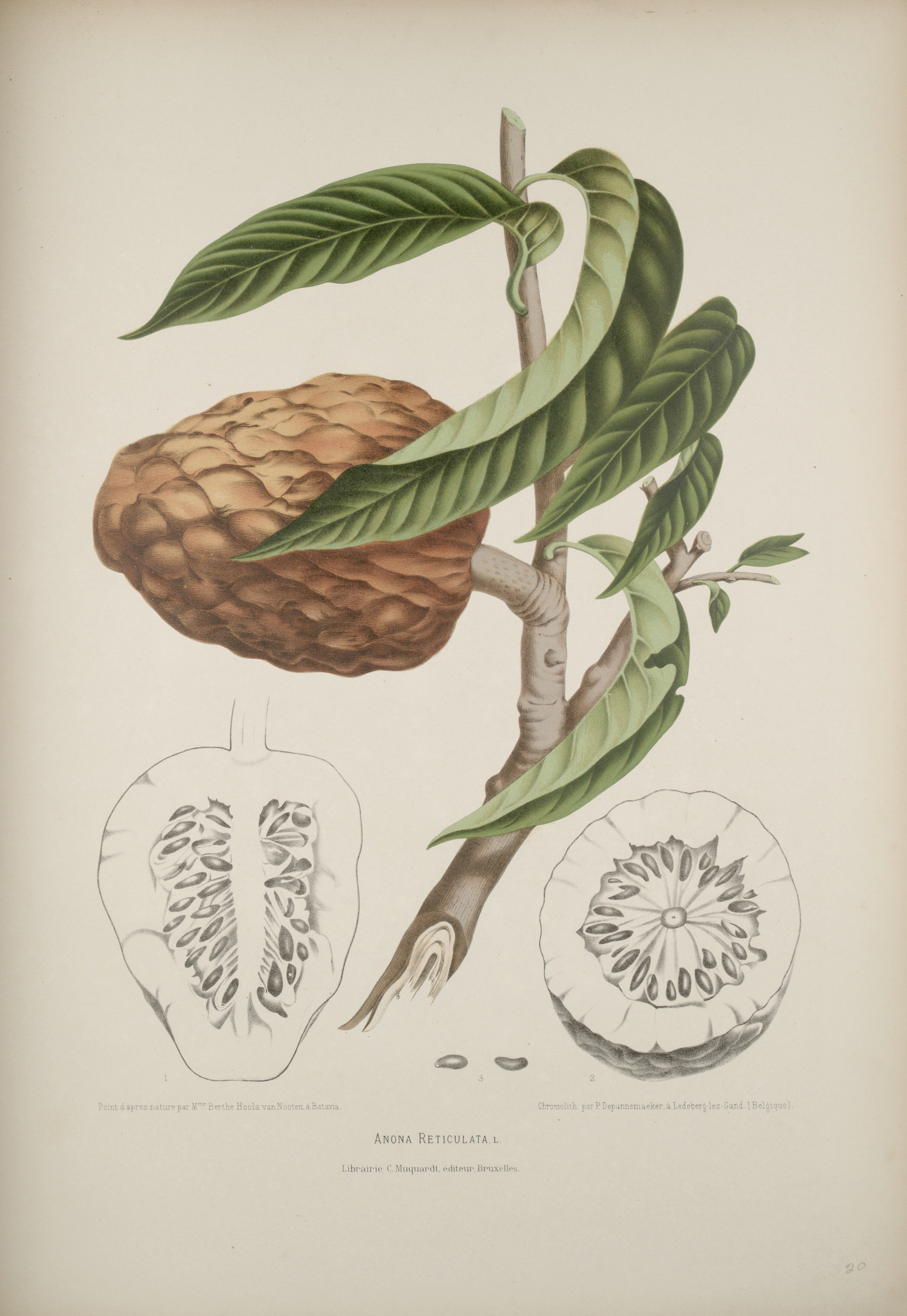
Custard apple: fruiting branch with sections of fruit and seeds.

Custard apple is a common name for several fruits and may refer to Annonaceae, the custard apple family, which includes the following species referred to as custard apples:

- Annona cherimola, a tree and fruit also called cherimoya
- Annona muricata, a tree and fruit also called guanábana or soursop
- Annona reticulata, a tree and fruit also called ox heart or bullock's heart
- Annona senegalensis, a tree and fruit called wild custard-apple
- Annona squamosa, a tree and fruit also called sugar apple or sweetsop
- Asimina triloba, the "pawpaw", a deciduous tree, with a range from southern Ontario to Texas and Florida, that bears the largest edible fruit native to the United States or Canada.

Custard apple may also refer to Casimiroa edulis, in the rue or citrus family, Rutaceae.
