= Gevrai =

- city
- Location in Maharashtra, India
- Coordinates: 19.16°N 75.45°E
- Country: India
- State: Maharashtra
- District: Beed

Area
  - Total: 20 km^{2} (7.7 sq mi)
- Elevation: 465 m (1,526 ft)

Population (2021)
  - Total: 47,000
  - Density: 2,400/km^{2} (6,100/sq mi)
- Demonym: Gevraikar

Languages
  - Official: Marathi
- Time zone: UTC+5:30 (IST)
- PIN: 431127
- Telephone code: 02447
- Vehicle registration: MH23

Gevrai or Georai is a tehsil in the Beed district of Maharashtra, India.

== Geography ==
Gevrai is located at the coordinates 19.16°N 75.45°E, and has an average elevation of 465 metres (1528 feet).

It lies on National Highway 211 which connects Solapur – Osmanabad – Beed – Sambhajinagar – Dhule in Maharashtra, as well as National Highway 222 connecting Vishakhapatnam – Kalyan.

Due to being located far from the sea, most of the surrounding area of georai taluka is dry and mountainous and the rest of the area is flat. Some of the hills 300 meters long are also located in the area. Having been located in the Deccan region, the Godavari river valley region is fertile. Some of the places are salty, at 5%.

The weather is usually warm as the summer is longer (extreme in May month) while winter is short. Monsoon starts between July and September however it rarely rains some of the year.

== Demographics ==
As of the 2011 Census of India, Gevrai had a population of 47000 with males constituting 52% of the population and females constituting 48%. Gevrai has an average literacy rate of 67%, which is higher than the national average of 59.5%. Total male literacy is 76%, while female literacy is at 58%. 14% of the population is under 6 years of age.

Religions in Gevrai
Religion	Percent
Hinduism	65.22%
Islam	29.83%
Buddhism	2.66%
Jainism	1.98%
Others†	0.30%
Distribution of religions †Includes Sikhism (0.1%) and Christianity (0,1/%).

== Education ==
- New Era Public School
- New Era International School
- New Era Junior College
- New Era Pre-Primary School
- Vimla Vidya Mandir
- Shiv Sharda Public School
- St Xaviers school
- Mhaske's IT Hub
- R. B. Attal College of Arts, Science and Commerce
- Sharda Vidya Mandir, Takadgaon Road
- New High School
- Z. P. High School
- Asharam School
- Anmol Balak Mandir
- Mahatma Phule Vidyalaya
- Rk public school

== Politics ==
In recent history, the political scene in Gevrai has been dominated by Shivajirao Pandit, his cousin Badamrao Pandit, and Shivajio's eldest son, Amarsingh Pandit. The current MLA for the Gevrai Vidhan Sabha constituency is BJP's Adv. Laxman Pawar who belongs to the Patil family (historically, the traditional heads of Gevrai). He won the 2014 Vidhan Sabha election by defeating NCP's Badamrao Pandit in a landslide of 60001 votes - the highest winning margin in the Marathwada region. Amarsingh Pandit currently represents Gevrai as an MLC. In the recent Municipal elections, the BJP won 18 of the 19 seats and also the President of Municipality's position, further consolidating the position of MLA Laxman Pawar in the town.

== See also ==
- Georai (Vidhan Sabha constituency)
- Beed (Lok Sabha constituency)
