= Water Regulations Advisory Scheme =

WRAS

WRAS approved product mark

The Water Regulations Advisory Scheme (WRAS) was a company that provided a range of services around UK drinking water safety. Since 2021, the company and its services were split into two entities; WaterRegsUK and Water Regulations Approval Scheme with the latter keeping the WRAS logo and an approvals process for water fittings.

After its creation in 1999, the WRAS term became a 'shorthand' within the UK as a conformance mark that demonstrates that an item complies with high standards set out by water regulations 1999 in the United Kingdom. In more recent years WRAS approval is now one of a few competing compliance schemes available.

Water Regulation 4 compliance is a way of proving that the item meets PART of the above legislation. So a plumbing fitting might be tested and approved - but if installed and/or operated incorrectly might breach the Water Regulations 1999.

Service provider, NSF and KIWA, offer third party testing for WRAS approval. Although not widely known other companies such as KIWA offer their own direct testing and approval services for a plumbing fitting (Water Regulation 4 compliance).

== Sources ==
- "The Water Supply (Water Fittings) Regulations 1999". Legislation.gov.uk.
- "What does CE marking mean? What do the initials CE stand for?". Department of Business Innovation and Skills. Archived from the original on 24 June 2010.
- "Like the CE logo, the Declaration of Conformity is one of the common threads throughout all the CE marking directives". Conformance.
- "KIWA watertec Water Fittings Approval".
