= Manjara Dam =

- Location within Maharashtra
- Official name: Manjara Dam D01111
- Location: Manjara River
- Coordinates: 18.6574059°N 75.6144494°E
- Opening date: 1982
- Owners: Government of Maharashtra, India

Dam and spillways
- Type of dam: Earthfill
- Impounds: Manjara River
- Height: 42 m (138 ft)
- Length: 4,203 m (13,789 ft)
- Dam volume: 2,213,000 m^{3} (78,200,000 cu ft)

Reservoir
- Creates: Manjara
- Total capacity: 0.25 km^{3} (0.060 cu mi)
- Surface area: 43 km^{2} (17 sq mi)

The Manjara Dam is an earthfill dam on the Manjara River, in the state of Maharashtra, India. Till September 2016, after four years of no rainfall the reservoir completely dried up. However at the end of September 2016 the reservoir became full.

The height of the dam above the lowest foundation is 25 m (82 ft) while the length is 4,203 m (13,789 ft). The live water storage capacity is 0.115 km^{3} (0.028 cu mi).

Although there is increased alkalinity during the summer season when dissolved oxygen is less, the water is suitable for irrigation.

== See also ==
- Dams in Maharashtra
- List of reservoirs and dams in India
