= Beed =

Beed Bīḍ
- City
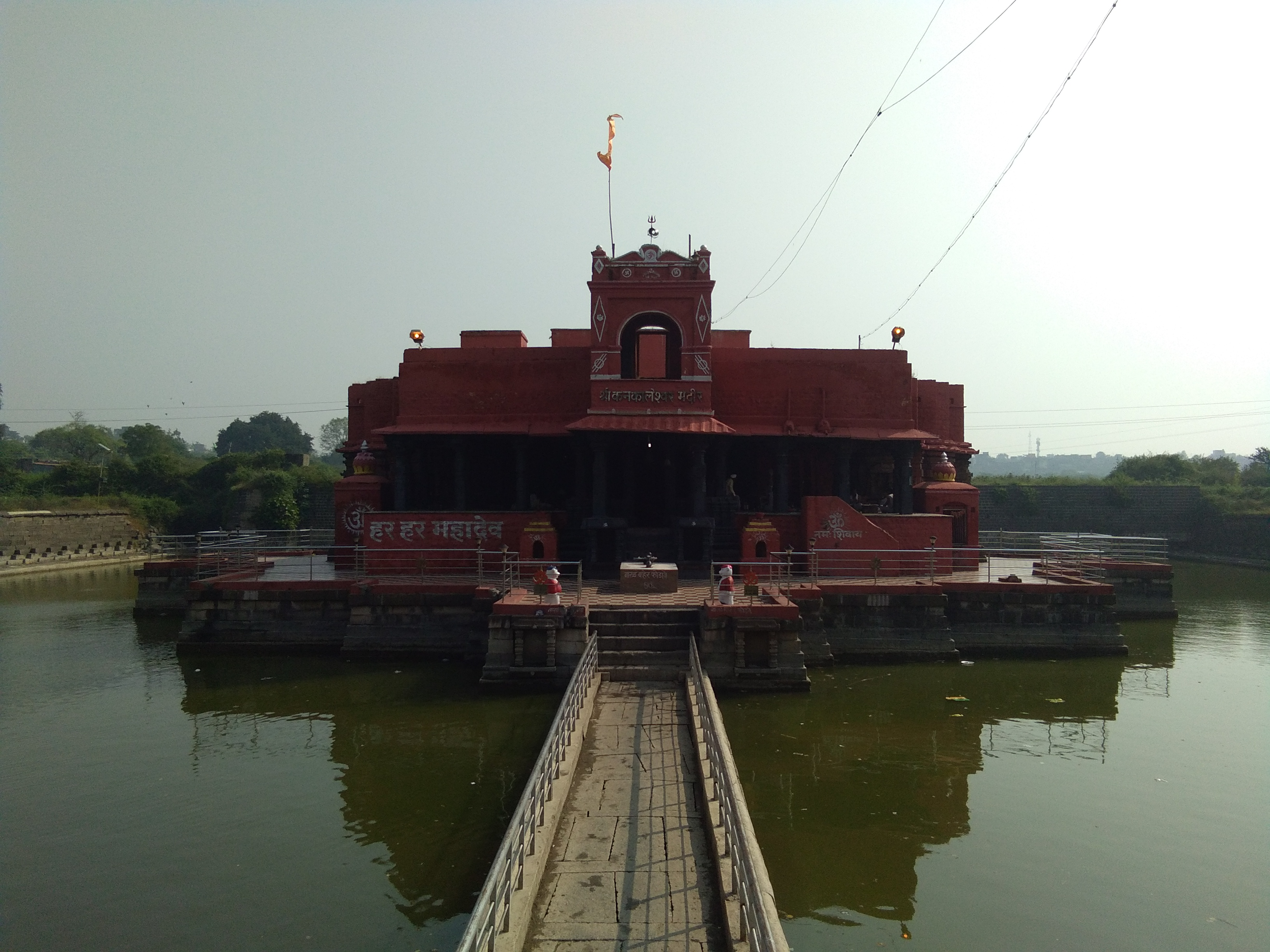
- Interactive map of Beed
- Location within India
- Coordinates: 18.99°N 75.76°E
- Country: India
- State: Maharashtra
- District: Beed District
- Division: Beed District
- Champavati Nagar: AD 758; 1268 years ago
- Founder: Rani Champavati

Government Beed
  - Type: Municipal Council
  - Body: Beed Municipal Council
  - President: Premlata Parwe (Nationalist Congress Party)
  - Vice-President: Vinod Rohidas Muluk
  - Chief Executive Officer: Utkarsh Gutte

Area
  - Total: 45 km^{2} (17 sq mi)
- Elevation: 515 m (1,690 ft)

Population (2011)
  - Total: 146,709
  - Density: 3,300/km^{2} (8,400/sq mi)
- Demonym: Beedkar
- Time zone: UTC+5:30 (IST)
- PIN: 431 122
- Telephone code: 02442
- Child sex ratio: 843 ♀/♂
- Literacy: 88.56%
- Male literacy: 94.01%
- Female literacy: 82.81%
- Official language: Marathi
- Precipitation: 666 millimetres (26.2 in)
- Avg. summer temperature: 40 °C (104 °F)
- Avg. winter temperature: 15 °C (59 °F)
- Website: beed.gov.in

Beed (Marathi pronunciation: [biːɖ]) is a city and headquarters of eponymous Beed district of Maharashtra state in India.

== History ==
Beed is a historical city of possibly medieval origin. Its early history is obscure. Historians speculate, based on archaeological remains, that the city might have been founded by the Yadava rulers (1173–1317) of Devagiri (Daulatabad). Beed was later governed by the Nizams during the period of British India. The Annexation of Hyderabad Operation Polo, the code name of the Hyderabad "Police Action", was a military operation in September 1948 in which the Indian Armed Forces invaded the State of Hyderabad and overthrew its Nizam, annexing the state into India. Beed remained in annexed Hyderabad state until 1956 when it was included in Bombay Presidency. On 1 May 1960 Maharashtra state was created on a linguistic basis, and Marathi Hindu & Muslim dominated Beed district became part of Maharashtra.

=== Foundation and name ===
The early history of Beed is unknown and there are contradictions in the historical accounts concerning its foundation and early history. According to legend, Beed was an inhabited place in the period of Pandavas and Kurus as Durgavati. Its name was subsequently changed to Balni. Champavati, who was sister of Vikramaditya, after captured and renamed it as Champavatinagar. After that the city fell to Chalukya, Rashtrkuta and Yadava dynasties before falling to Muslim rule. However, some scholars say that it was possibly founded by the Yadava rulers of Devagiri (Daulatabad).

Tārīkh-e-Bīr (history of Beed) mentions that Muhammad bin Tughluq named it Bir (Arabic بئر meaning 'well') after building a fort and several wells in and around the city. Ground water was abundant in the city and when wells were built, water was found just several feet down. Until recent times, wells were abundant in the city. They became less important due to a modern system of water supply, hence subsequently most of them were filled. It is unclear as to how the present name Beed came into use. There are at least two different traditions. The first tradition says that since the district is situated at the foot of Balaghat Range as if it is in a hole, it was named as Bil (बील Marathi for hole) which in course of time corrupted to Bid. According to the second tradition a Yavana (यवण) ruler of ancient India named it Bhir (Persian ٻھېڔ for water) after finding water at a very low depth and Bhir might have become Beed in course of time. The first tradition seems to be untrue, because with no angle, the entire district can be called a 'hole'. Only the north eastern part of the district is at lower heights and a vast area of 10,615 km^{2} can not be called a 'hole' just because of slight depression. Furthermore, Bil (बील hole) in Marathi is spoken for a deep and narrow hole and not for a slight depression.

The second tradition though have some distortion, appears to be true and in accord with Tārīkh-e-Bīr of Quazi Muhammad Qutubullah (1898). The word 'Yavana' in early Indian literature meant a Greek or any foreigner. At a much later date it was frequently applied to the Muslim invaders of India. It is quite possible that Muhammad bin Tughluq may have been referred to in this tradition as Yavana ruler. Muslims ruled the Deccan for centuries and almost all Muslim rulers had Persian as their court language. It seems that Arabic word 'Bir' was eventually pronounced 'Bhir' in the Indian accent and the people mistakenly took this Arabic word as Persian since the court language of the rulers was Persian. Until recent times after independence, the city was called 'Bir' and 'Bhir' in the official documents.

=== In mythology ===
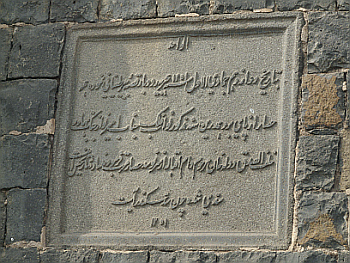
A plaque in Persian (فارسى) on Bab-uz-zafar (Kotwali gate) states the re-construction of eastern protection wall by Amir Nawaz Jang in 1835.

According to legend, when Ravana, demon king of Lanka (Sri Lanka), abducted Sita (wife of Hindu deity Rama) and was taking her to Lanka, Jatayu (eagle) tried to stop him. Ravana cut its wings and wounded Jatayu fell on the ground. When Rama reached there in search of his beloved wife, Jatayu told him the whole story and died. The place where he died is said to be in Beed city and Jatashankar temple is standing at the place, which is; according to scholars, possibly built by Yadavas of Devagiri. However, Jatashankar temples are abundant in other parts of India with same narrations. Another legend also narrates that Beed was called Durgavati in the period of Pandavas and Kurus who fought a legendary war of Mahabharata.

=== Early history ===
Early history of the Beed is obscure until it became part of Tughluq empire. If the city was founded in Yadava era then possibly it happened in king Singhana's (1210–47) period, when Yadava dynasty was at its height. Singhana may have built Kankaleshwar temple with a small surrounding city. Beed came under Muslim rule for the first time in 1317 when Qutb-ud-Din Mubarak Shah (1316–20), the last Khalji, captured Devagiri and Yadava dynasty was ended. Beed remained under Khaljis until 1320 when Ghiyas-ud-Din Tughluq (1320–25) took over. In 1327 Muhammad bin Tughluq (1325–51) made Daulatabad his capital. Firishta narrates that Tughluq and his army camped near Bīr city in 1341 (AH 742 Islamic calendar) while on the journey back to Daulatabad from Warangal. The emperor lost one of his teeth here, which he ordered to be buried with much ceremony and a tomb was constructed at the place. The tomb of Tughluq's tooth is in about to collapse condition on a hill near the village Karjani about 13 km south of the city. Junna Khan one of the governors of Tughluq empire is said to have resided in Beed for quite some time and introduced many reforms for the welfare of the ruled. He diverted the course of Bensura from west to east by constructing a protection wall around the city. Before his time there was no such protection for the city and it was situated on the eastern bank of the river. After that the population was largely shifted to the western part.

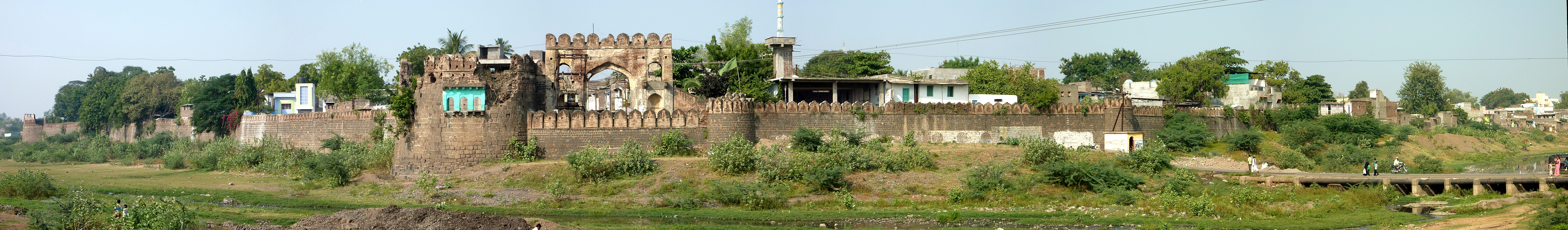
Panoramic view of eastern wall of the Fort. It works as a shield for old city from rare but violent floods of Bensura (Bendsura) river which is seen in the photo as a plain area with plenty of shrubs. The wall & burjs of the fort have lost the splendor and is about to crumble.

In 1347 Beed came under Bahmani rule when Hasan Gangu (1347–58), founder of Bahmani Sultanate, rebelled against Tughluq rule and ascended throne of Daulatabad as Ala-ud-Din Bahman Shah. Muhammad Tughluq acted vigorously and came to Deccan to subdue the rebels. He recaptured the province of Daulatabad, of which, Beed was a part. Hasan Gangu and other insurgents fled to Bidar and Gulbarga through Beed. Before the matter is fully settled a rebel broke in Gujarat and the sultan approached to Gujarat appointing Imad-ul-Mulk as governor in Deccan. Meanwhile, Hasan Gangu attacked Daulatabad and marched towards Beed and captured it. After that the city remained under Bahmanid rule and is said to be flourished under Firuz Shah Bahmani's (1397–1422) rule. During the reign of Humayun Shah Bahmani (1451–61), famous as Zālim (cruel), his brother Hasan Shah rebelled and came to Beed. A Jagirdar (feudatory) of Beed, Habibullah Shah was his supporter. Humayun Shah sent an army and after a fierce fighting in the grounds of Kankaleshwar temple, the rebellion armies defeated Humayun's army. Humayun became furious and sent another force to defeat the rebels. This time rebels were defeated, Habibullah Shah was killed and captured Hasan Shah was taken to the capital and was put before a hungry lion.

=== 1600 to 1858 ===
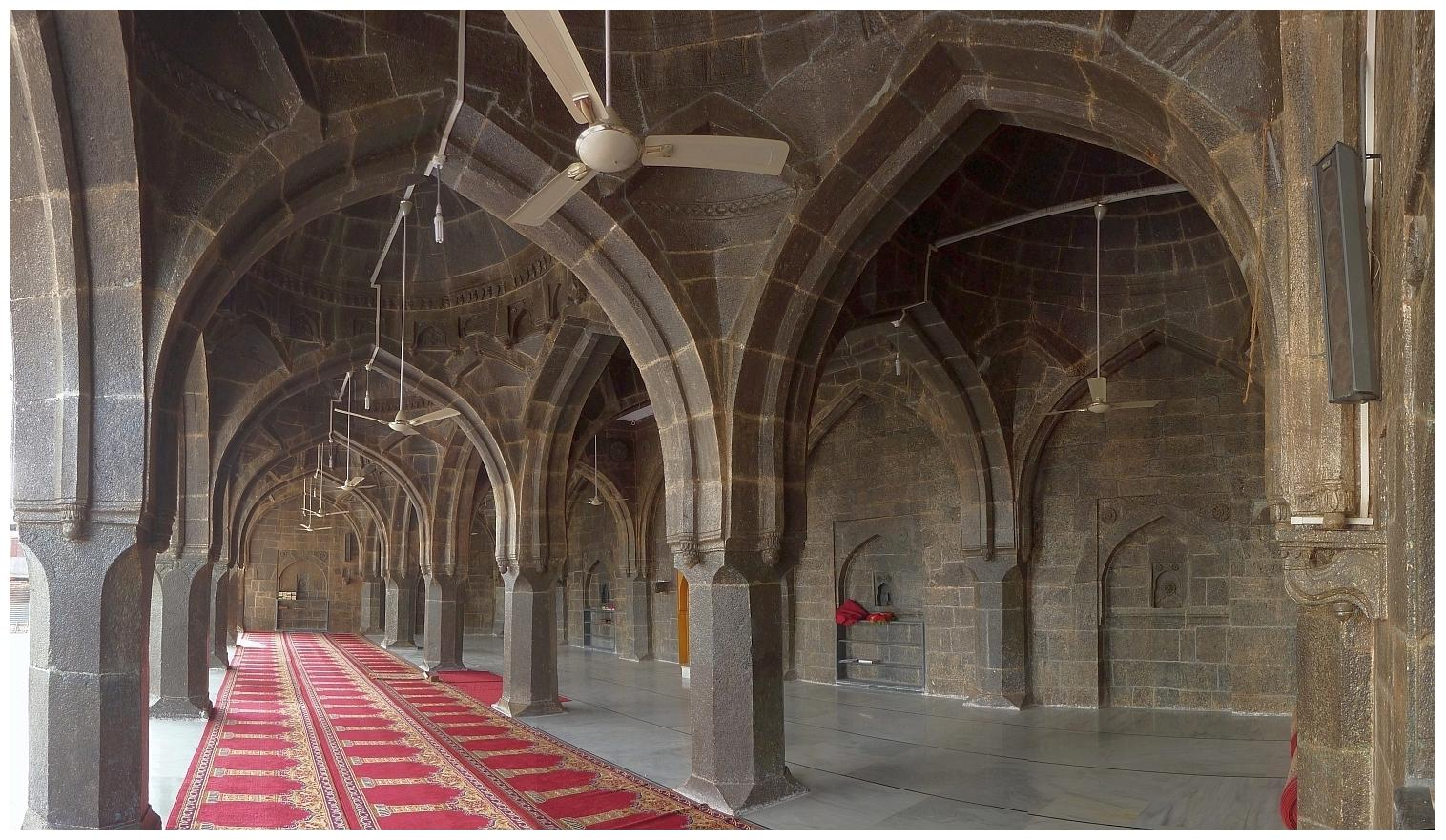
Inside of the Jama Masjid جامع مسجد (Grand Mosque) of Beed. One of the largest Masjids in Beed, this magnificent structure is built completely in stone and has ten domes. All the domes of Masjid are unique in design and does not match with each other.

After the decline of Bahmani Sultanate, the city fell to Nizam Shahi rulers of Ahmadnagar. Several wars were fought in Beed between Nizam Shahi and Adil Shahi rulers of Bijapur to take the control of Beed. In 1598 Mughals captured Beed from Chand Bibi of Ahmadnagar. A year later Nihang Khan retook it but soon it fell again to Mughals. Mughal army camped here for some time. During the reign of Jahangir (1569–1627), Jan Sipar Khan was administering Beed city. He constructed Jama Masjid of Beed in 1036 AH (1627).

Aurangzeb (1658–1707), appointed Haji Sadar Shah in Beed as Naib-e-Subadar (assistant of governor). Sadar Shah did some good changes and constructions in the city. He built Eid Gah (place of Eid prayer) in 1702 and a new habitation on the heights in the eastern part as Ghazi Pura (now Islam Pura) in 1703. The remains of it are still visible. He also constructed a citadel (1703) inside the old fort which was worn out after standing for several hundred years, from Tughluq period. A stone plate in Persian script at the main entry of Jama Masjid sets the year of construction of citadel by Haji Sadar Shah in the year 1115 AH (1703). In his period economy of the city also flourished. Chhagal (water container made from leather), Gupti (hidden sword in wooden stick) etc. made in Beed were popular in the region.

Beed was quite a beautiful city during Bahmanis and Mughals. Tārīkh-e-Bīr mentions many gardens and amenities of these periods. Until the 1960s there were two well maintained gardens in the city. In 1724 Nizam-ul-Mulk Asaf Jah founded Asaf Jahi kingdom, seizing Deccan against the rule of Mughal emperor Muhammad Shah (1719–48). In Nizams' era no major addition or construction was done to the citadel because the old building was serving the purpose and the citadels were losing importance with the advent of modern fighting techniques.

Maratha ruler of Gwalior, Mahadji Scindia (1761–94) was missing after a severe injury and defeat in the third war of Panipat in 1761. His wife, who is said to be from Beed, went to a Muslim Sufi of Beed Mansur Shah and told him to prey for the return of Mahadji. When Mahadji returned to Gwalior, he called the Sufi to Gwalior but he refused and sent his son Habib Shah instead. Mahadji remained thankful to Mansur Shah for all his life. His tomb is in eastern Beed which was built by Scindias.

Reign of sixth Nizam Mir Mahbub Ali Khan (1869–1911) proved eventful in the history of Beed. Rebels, great famine and floods happened in his reign. Jagirdars were replaced by collectors (Awwal Taluqdars) in his father's reign and Jivanji Ratanji came as the first collector of Beed in 1865. Districts were created and Beed district was formally settled in 1883. He constructed one habitation and market Mahbub Gunj (now Hiralal Chowk) on the eastern bank of Bensura, remains of that can still be seen. After a very scarce rainfall in three successive years 1897–99, great famine occurred in Beed in 1900. Thousands of cattle and Hundreds of humans died of starvation and thousands migrated to the neighbouring parts of the country. The census in 1901 reported remarkable decrease of 150,464 in the population of Beed district. Mir Osman Ali Khan (1911–48) came after death of Mahbub Ali Khan as seventh and the last Nizam of Hyderabad State. His period was full of reforms in the government system, education and healthcare. Kotwalis, Police Stations, Schools, Hospitals and Dispensaries were built during his period. He established big libraries with the high schools in the state.

Nizams were allies of the British Empire in India. During the countrywide movement for independence, in 19th and 20th centuries they tried to suppress the feelings of nationalism which were spreading due to nationwide efforts of the freedom fighters. Nationalists in the state of Hyderabad did not like Nizam's friendship with the British Empire. Beed was the place in Marathwada region where freedom struggle first started in 1818.

In 1818 during the rule of Nizam Sikandar Jah (1803–29) first rebel broke out in Beed under the leadership of Dharmaji 'Pratap Rao' Garje along with the Peshwa Bajirao II. Nizam sent the Risala of Navab Murtaza Yar Jang under the command of British Lieutenant John Sutherland. The rebel leader and his brother were captured and a long run rebellion movement in Beed came to an end.

=== 1858 to Present ===
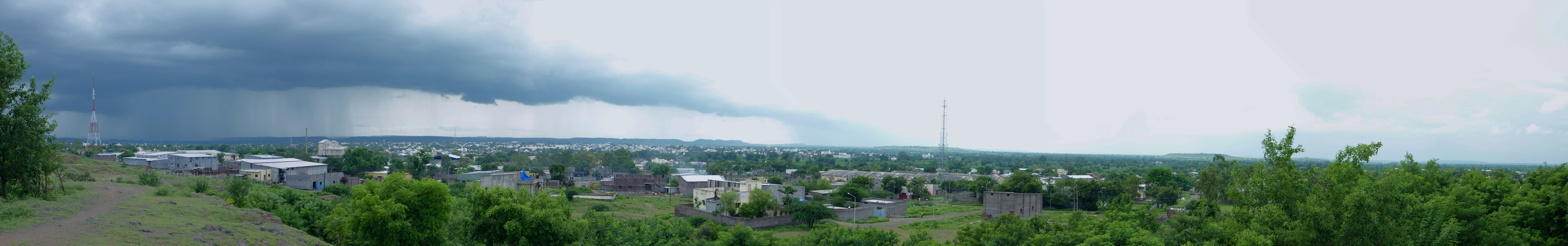
Panoramic view of a part of Beed city from the eastern hills on a rainy day. Eastern hills in the city and western hill range are visible in the view

Another rebellion broke in 1858 but all the rebels were captured. After this many small incidents of defiance happened against British rule but all were suppressed by force. A major rebel broke under the leadership of Baba Saheb alias Rao Sahab Deshpande in 1898. The important leaders of this movement were Brahmins of Beed and the Deshastha Brahmin officials in police and judiciary also supported the movement. . But after a short fight the rebels were captured and the movement came to an end. But the feelings of defiance could not be suppressed and different movements under the leadership of Swami Ramanand Teerth continued in Marathwada and the state. After independence, Mir Osman Ali Khan was reluctant to join India. Finally, on 12 September 1948 a military action Operation Polo was launched and the state was easily captured within six days as Nizam's army resisted little. Although Operation Polo caused relatively few casualties, the following communal carnage was all the more terrible. Beed was one of the eight worst hit districts in the state. After calm down, a team visited the town on behalf of Indian government and sent a report to the centre. According to official, Sundarlal Report, 27,000–40,000 Muslims were killed throughout the state. Horrible crimes of abduction and rape of Muslim women's & girls, loot, arson, desecration of masjids, forcible conversions and seizure of houses and lands were mentioned in the report. Some unofficial reports, however, puts the figure of killings up to 50,000 and some even to a few hundred thousand. A plebiscite was held shortly after the military action in which the population voted overwhelmingly in favour of joining India. Many Muslims during and after 1948 migrated to Pakistan. The city has witnessed communal strife several times in modern India. In 1949 Bendsura Project was launched to provide drinking and irrigation water supply to the city and nearby villages. The project was completed in 1956. In 1952, Beed Nagar Pālika (Municipal Council) was established under the undivided Hyderabad State. In 1962, a year after the creation of Maharashtra State, Beed District Council (krushna temple) came into being after dissolving all the local bodies.

== Beed district consists of 11 talukas (tehsils) ==
1. Ambajogai
2. Ashti
3. Beed
4. Dharur
5. Georai
6. Kaij
7. Majalgaon
8. Parli Vaijnath
9. Patoda
10. Wadwani
11. Shirur Kasar

These talukas (tehsils) are administrative subdivisions that help manage the region's governance and services like healthcare, education, and infrastructure

== Topography ==
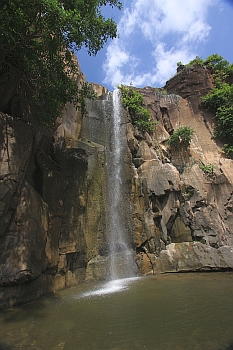
The Kapildhar fall in Balaghat range about 18 km south of Beed city.

=== Location ===
Beed is situated on the Deccan Plateau, on the banks of the Bensura river (also called Bendsura or Bindusara). Bensura is a sub-tributary of Godavari river originating in the hills of Balaghat range, about 30 km south-west of Beed near the village of Waghira. The river divides the city into smaller eastern and larger western parts. Balaghat Range stretches very close, up to 10 km south of the city resulting in undulating terrain in the eastern part of the city. Soil is coarse and rocky largely consisting of basalt. Thin layers of fertile black soil are also seen in the northern part of the city. Bensura is a rapid and seasonal river. Bendsura Project (capacity 7.106 mm^{3}) was constructed on the river in 1955 near the village Pāli, about 10 km south of the city. At some places in the city, the river is narrow and looks like a stream. The river has slop due to undulating terrain which contributes to violent floods when it rains heavy. Floods have repeatedly caused substantial loss of property and life in the history of the city, most recently on 23 July 1989 when a massive flooding of three habitations in the city caused a number of dead or missing and property losses of millions of rupees. Beed falls under Seismic Hazard Zone-III in India according to the new seismic hazard map updated in 2000 by the Bureau of Indian Standards. The city was under Zone-I prior to this update. Beed is 400 km from Mumbai.

=== Climate ===
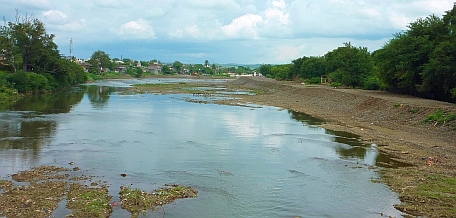
The Bensura River(Bendsura). It is cleaned of debris and garbage before a monsoon to facilitate the flow of flooding water. Photographed in the monsoon season.

The city has Semi-arid, hot and dry climate consisting mainly of three seasons. Summers are long, ranging almost five months from mid February to June. Temperatures in summer fall between 31 °C (87.8 °F) – 40 °C (104 °F) (1997 average). However, it may reach higher than 40 °C in searching summer. May is the hottest month of a year with an average day temperature of 42 °C (107.6 °F). Winters are short with temperatures ranging within 12 °C (53.6 °F) – 20 °C (68 °F). December is the coldest month in a year. Occasionally, temperature may fall as low as 3 °C (37.4 °F) or 4 °C (39.2 °F) due to northern cold waves. Relative humidity in winter is the lowest and December is the driest month in a year with the relative humidity as low as 30%. Rains are scarce and occur only during the Monsoon from mid June to September. Annual average rainfall is 66.6 cm (26.22 inches). The average rain fall has dropped 9.6 cm from the averages recorded during the 1900s. Average number of rainy days in a year is 41. September gets the maximum rainfall in a year while July has the maximum rainy days. Highest rainfall recorded in 24 hours (19.18 cm) occurred on 17 August 1887. Climate of Beed can be compared with that of Pune city's climate. Beed receives low rainfall because it is located in rain shadow area.

Climate data for Beed (1991–2020, extremes 1960–2020)
Month	Jan	Feb	Mar	Apr	May	Jun	Jul	Aug	Sep	Oct	Nov	Dec	Year
Record high °C (°F)	35.0 (95.0)	38.4 (101.1)	43.6 (110.5)	44.6 (112.3)	47.0 (116.6)	44.3 (111.7)	38.9 (102.0)	38.8 (101.8)	37.8 (100.0)	37.7 (99.9)	34.6 (94.3)	34.0 (93.2)	47.0 (116.6)
Mean daily maximum °C (°F)	29.8 (85.6)	32.2 (90.0)	36.7 (98.1)	39.0 (102.2)	40.7 (105.3)	36.2 (97.2)	31.2 (88.2)	30.6 (87.1)	31.1 (88.0)	31.8 (89.2)	30.1 (86.2)	29.0 (84.2)	33.2 (91.8)
Mean daily minimum °C (°F)	13.8 (56.8)	15.1 (59.2)	19.5 (67.1)	22.9 (73.2)	25.4 (77.7)	24.8 (76.6)	23.4 (74.1)	22.7 (72.9)	21.9 (71.4)	20.3 (68.5)	16.0 (60.8)	12.4 (54.3)	19.9 (67.8)
Record low °C (°F)	4.0 (39.2)	4.6 (40.3)	9.4 (48.9)	13.0 (55.4)	16.5 (61.7)	20.2 (68.4)	19.8 (67.6)	18.0 (64.4)	15.7 (60.3)	10.5 (50.9)	5.0 (41.0)	5.0 (41.0)	4.0 (39.2)
Average rainfall mm (inches)	1.1 (0.04)	2.3 (0.09)	6.2 (0.24)	10.2 (0.40)	9.2 (0.36)	115.9 (4.56)	145.7 (5.74)	128.5 (5.06)	190.7 (7.51)	79.9 (3.15)	8.7 (0.34)	6.7 (0.26)	705.0 (27.76)
Average rainy days	0.1	0.1	0.5	0.9	0.9	6.3	8.5	7.8	9.7	4.4	0.7	0.3	40.2
Average relative humidity (%) (at 17:30 IST)	38	29	24	29	25	48	65	68	64	54	50	46	45
Source: India Meteorological Department

== Demographics ==
At the time of the 2011 census, Beed Municipal Council has a population of 146,709. Males are 75,566 and females 71,143, for a sex ratio of 941 females per 1000 males. 13.60% of the population is under 6 years of age, and the child sex ratio is 854. Beed has a literacy rate of 89.34%. Scheduled Castes and Scheduled Tribes make up 9.51% and 0.90% of the population respectively.

Death rate is 3 which is lower than the national average of 8.2. Infant mortality rate is 71 per thousand live births which is much higher than the national average of 54.6 deaths for thousand live births. Maternal mortality rate however, is 1 which is extremely lower than the national average of 540. Beed district has got the lowest sex ratio in Maharashtra State. Beed has the lowest male-female sex ratio in the age group of 0–6 years (801 as against 1000 male children) as per the 2011 census. Maharashtra's sex ratio in the age group of 0–6 years is 883 girls as against 1000 boys.

Religions in Beed City (2011)
Religion	Percent
Hinduism	53.75%
Islam	40.63%
Buddhism	3.22%
Jainism	1.60%
Other or not stated	0.80%

Even this small town is an evidence of India's religious and cultural diversity. 69.15 km^{2} of land is home for Hindu, Muslim, Buddhist, Jain, Christian and Sikh communities. A calculated Hindu population in the town comprises around 54%. 12,307 Hindus were living in the town in 1901, which was 69.64% of the then population. Moreover, Jain population was also considered as Hindu at that time. 4,993 Muslims were living in the town in 1901 which was 28.25% of the then population. Today Muslims are nearly 41% of the population in the city. Buddhists and Jains are small minorities.

Language in Beed City (2011)
1. Marathi (52.4%)
2. Urdu (35.5%)
3. Hindi (7.80%)
4. Marwari (2.32%)
5. Other (2.06%)

At the time of the 2011 census, 52.35% of the population spoke Marathi, 35.47% Urdu, 7.80% Hindi and 2.32% Marwari as their first language.

== Culture ==
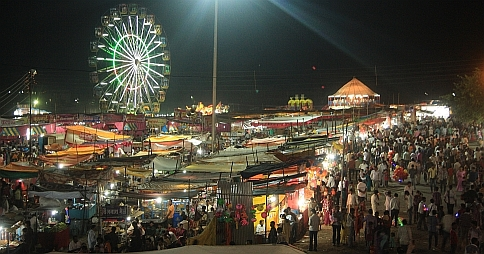
Jatra — night view of Khandeshwari jatra which is held during Dussehra each year.

There are no public places in the city except cinema halls and a small, little maintained garden. Till few years back there were seven cinema halls, but now in 2018 only two are remaining; namely 'Asha' and 'Santoshimata'. Two parks were maintained until 1969 by the municipal council.

== Economy ==
Beed has a growing economy with a rapid growth. In 1997, Sarma committee listed Beed as one of the 100 most rapid growing districts in India. After this listing the government of India and the government of Maharashtra specified Beed town as 'D' zone and declared tax holiday and concessions to lure the investors in the district. Without proper arrangement of water supply and transport facility, this declaration resulted nothing. Economic backwardness is attributed to the lack of natural resources, frequent droughts, lack of good transport facilities and corruption. Economy entirely depends on monsoon dependent agriculture, service sector and small businesses. Beed is one of the poorest districts of Maharashtra (in the bottom 10 in 2019-2022) with Per capita GDP of Rs 128,660 (about $1812) which was much lower than the Maharashtra State average GDP Rs 229,488 (about $3232) in 2019-2020.

== Health ==
Beed was in the international news in August 1994 for the outbreak of Bubonic Plague. To some researchers, though, the disease detected here resembled Plague but could not be substantiated as per WHO criteria.

== Media and communication ==
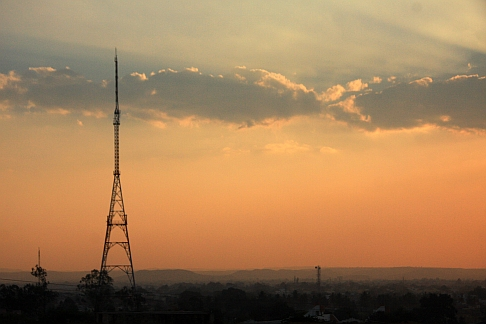
Radio transmission tower of Akashwani Beed from the eastern hills

More than a dozen Marathi and two Urdu dailys are published from the city. Beed Reporter (newspaper), Champavati Patra, Lok Prashna, Lokasha, Parshv Bhumi and Zunjar Neta are major Marathi dailies.alhilal times one and only Urdu news paper daily published Local and regional news, crime stories and articles on local issues and politics are common features of the dailies. Marathi, Urdu, Hindi and English dailies including national dailies publishing from different cities of India also have consumers in city. No magazines are published in the city, but all the major national magazines do have readers.

Bharat Sanchar Nigam Limited (BSNL), a state owned telephone service provider, has more than 15,000 customers. It has also introduced broadband internet lines.

Some enthusiasts have started a local cable channel ‘Beed News’. It provides local news coverage and plays movies rest of the time.

All India Radio Beed, at FM 102.9 MHz, broadcasts news, film and folk music, programmes of Vividh Bharti and programmes based on agriculture and health education.

== Issues and challenges in the 21st century ==
Beed district as a whole —

- Population below poverty line = 32.4%
- Sex ratio = 912 (rural) ♀/♂
- Estimated coverage of safe drinking water (habitations) = 66.1%
- Villages not connected by paved roads = 52.82%

Beed has a long history as a neglected and backward area. Industrial and economic backwardness, lack of good transport facility, electricity and literacy were the issues in the 1960s and they are the same even today. Many elections have been fought with the issue of railway line facility. In the recent times the list of issues has gone up with a shortage of drinking water supply and electricity, frequent droughts, failing crops and suicide of farmers, unemployment, corruption and increasing crimes. Beed also records highest power theft in Maharashtra. Nearly 60% power supplied to the district is stolen before it can reach to the consumers who pay for it. Further, unpaid electricity bills runs to almost Rupees 4540 million (about $113 M) .

The district ranks 143rd in literacy in India based on IndianNgos.com research and analysis of 586 districts throughout India. On Human Development Index (HDI), using UNDP method, Beed ranks 18th out of 30 districts in the State of Maharashtra, with 0.47 HDI. It is 7th poorest district in the state with Human Poverty Index (HPI) of 21.21. Deforestation, desertification, frequent droughts, shrinking water reservoirs and extreme shortages of drinking water, especially in rural areas are major issues which needs urgent attention. Beed district, according to the official statistics, has only 2.47% forest area, that too of lower quality. Attitude of people is the major concern. As the literacy is quite low, bringing change starts with change in the outlook and behaviour of people.

== Historical buildings ==
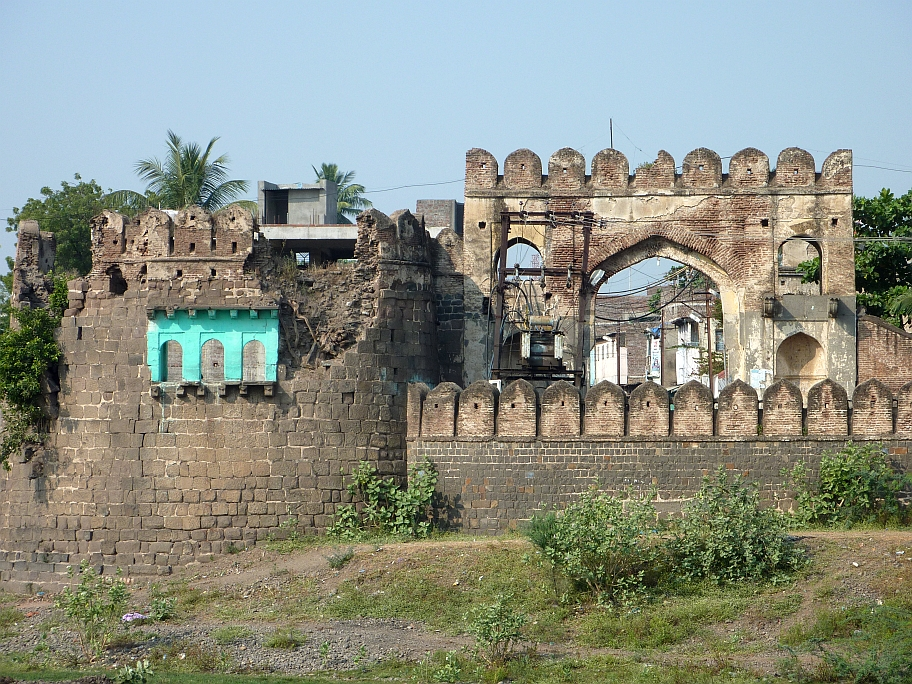
Bāb-uz-Zafar (Gate of success) — now known as Kotwali Ves (Kotwali gate) was re-built in 1835 on the western bank of Bendsura. The gate is now in poor condition and the adjacent Fatah Burj on left is almost gone.

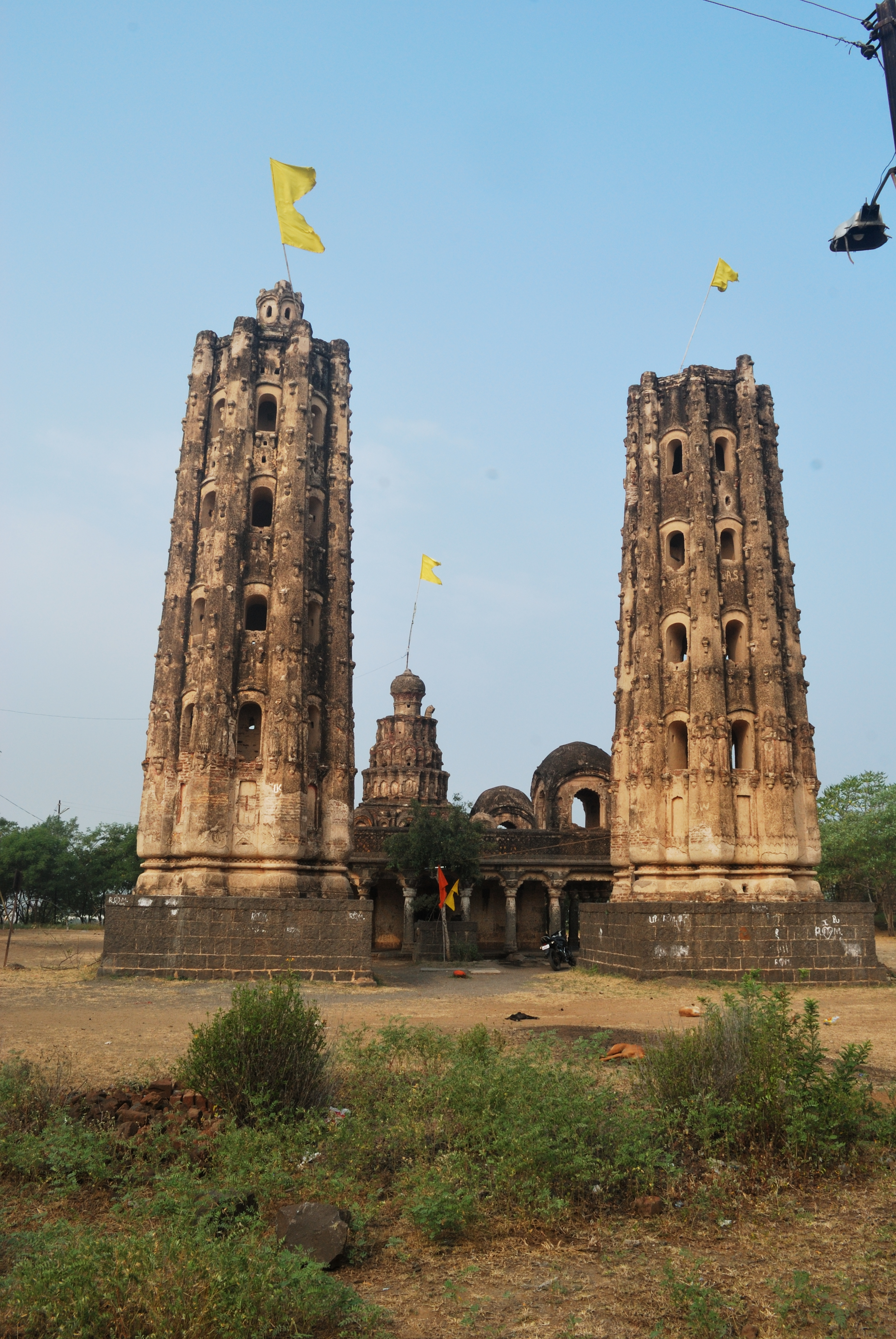
Khandoba Temple, Beed

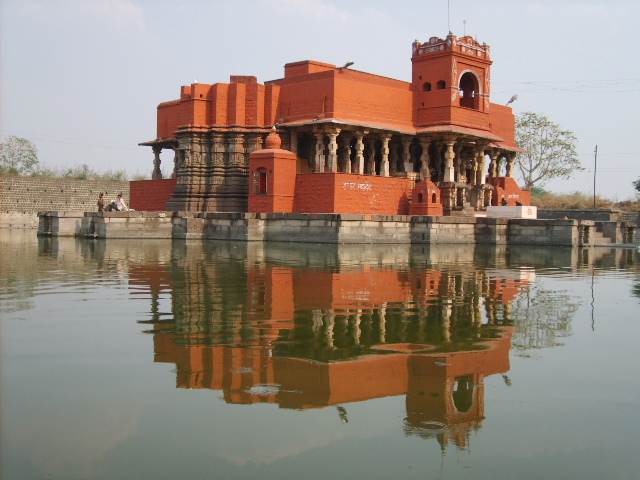
Kanakaleshwar Temple

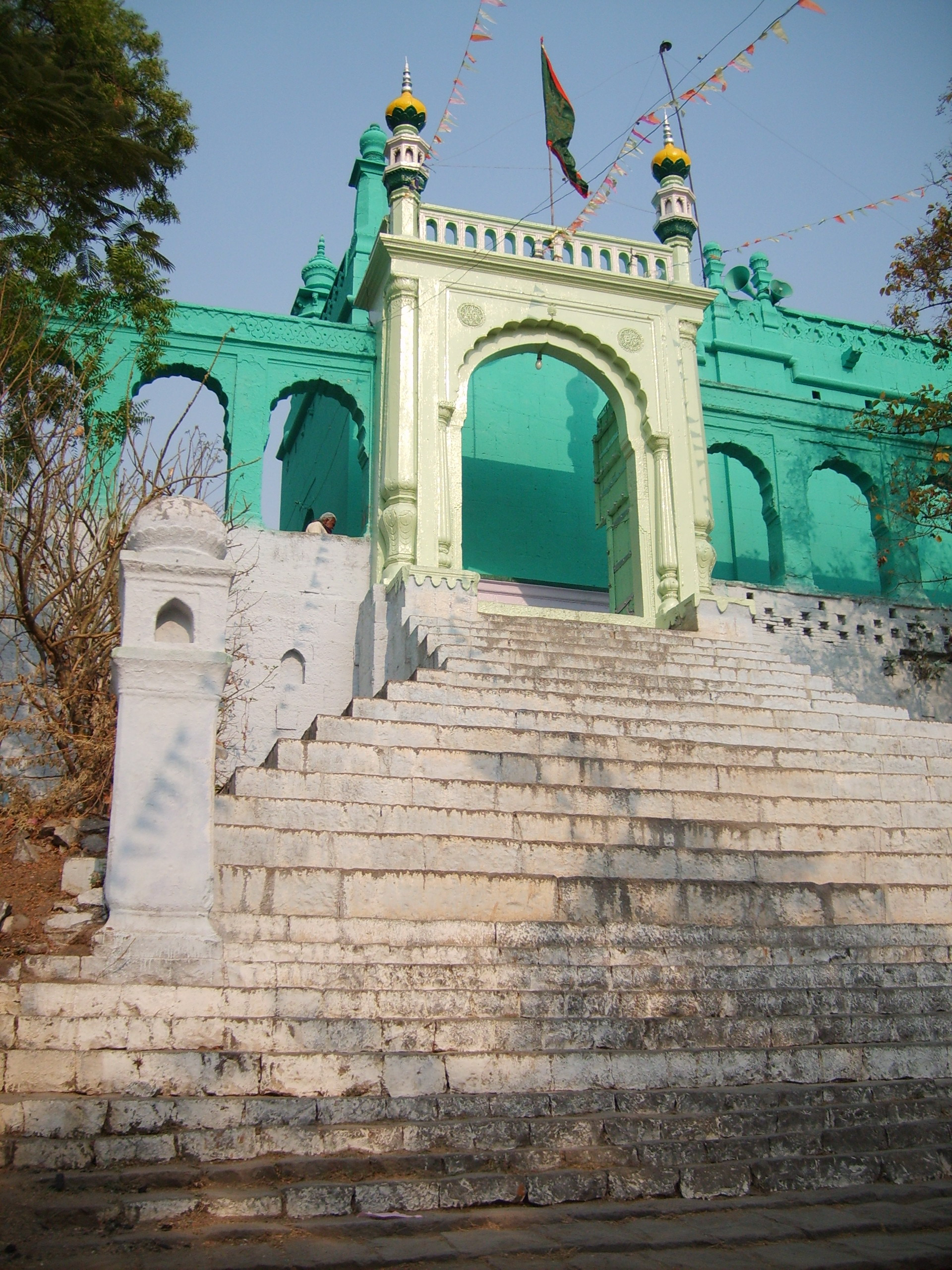
This main entrance of Kochak Shah alias Shahinshah Wali tomb was constructed by Amīr Nawāz Jang in 1830.

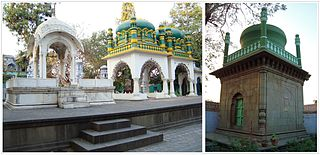
Mansur Shah tomb in the eastern part of Beed city.

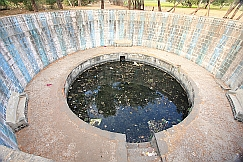
Khajana well about 6 km south of the city.

Beed is home to several historical buildings, some of the noteworthy are:

The Kanakaleshwar Temple which is one of old temples in beed. It is a temple of Lord Shiva. It is surrounded by water from all sides.

The Khandoba temple is situated on the eastern hills. Built in Hemadpanti style. Two symmetrical, octagonal dīpmal (tower of light) rising 21.33 meters (70 ft) are standing in front of the temple. Towers have carved figures of humans and animals, now most of them defaced. There are two stories about the construction of this temple. One says that it was built by Sultanji Nimbalkar a Jagirdar of Nizam era. The other says that it was built by Mahadji Scindia. Tārīkh-e-Bīr (History of Beed) mentions it with Nimbalkar.

The Jama Masjid (Grand Mosque) is a Masjid situated in the centre of the city at Quila (fort) and is one of the largest Masjids of Beed city. It was built during the period of Mughal emperor Jahāngīr (1605–27) by his official in Beed Jān Sipār Khan in 1627 (1036 Islamic Year). Constructed completely in stone, it has ten huge domes and four minarets. All the domes are having different designs from inside and does not match with each other.

The Shahinshah Wali tomb: Shahinshah Wali was a Sufi of the 14th century from Chishtiya clan. He came to Beed during the rule of Muhammad Tughluq. His tomb and surrounding areas were built in different periods from 1385 to 1840. The details can be seen in the history of Beed. It is situated on the eastern elevations. Each year an Urs (fair) is held here on 2nd day of Rabi’ Al-Awwal, third month of Islamic calendar.

The Mansur Shah tomb: Mansur Shah was 18th century Sufi of Suharwardy clan of Sufis. He is said to be a Dharma Guru (spiritual teacher) of Mahadji Scindia. His tomb is in the eastern part of Beed near Khandeshwari temple. The dome of the shrine is made of marble.

== Notable people ==
- Bhaskaracharya, famous mathematician
- Sundarrao Solanke, Indian politician who served as Deputy Chief Minister of Maharashtra state
- Gopinathrao Munde, senior leader of the Bharatiya Janata Party (BJP)
- Pankaja Munde, Indian politician belonging to the Bharatiya Janata Party
- Dhananjay Munde, member of Maharashtra Legislative Council, representing the Nationalist Congress Party
- Sanjay Bangar, Cricket player and Indian team coach
- Makarand Anaspure, Marathi actor and producer
- Sandeep Pathak, Marathi Actor
- Mohammad Nubairshah Shaikh, Chess - International Master & Recipient of the Shiv Chhatrapati Award
- Prakashdada Solanke MLA
- Suresh Dhas, member of the Maharashtra Legislative Council and former state minister Maharashtra
- Vimal Mundada, Indian politician belonging to the Nationalist Congress Party

== See also ==
- Marathwada
- Sonesangavi
- Kaij
