= Beed district =

- District
- BEED
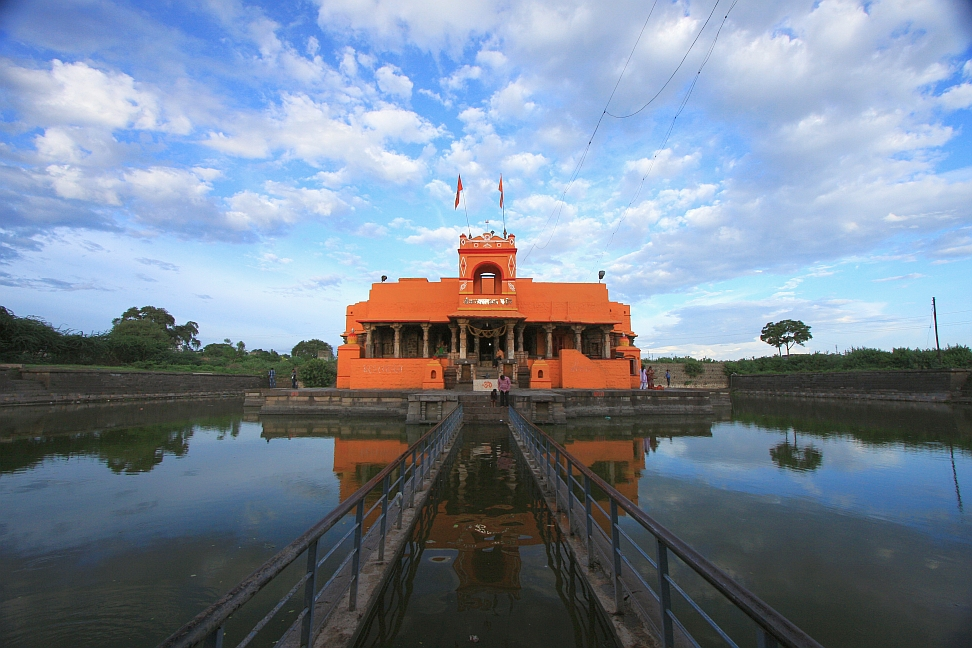
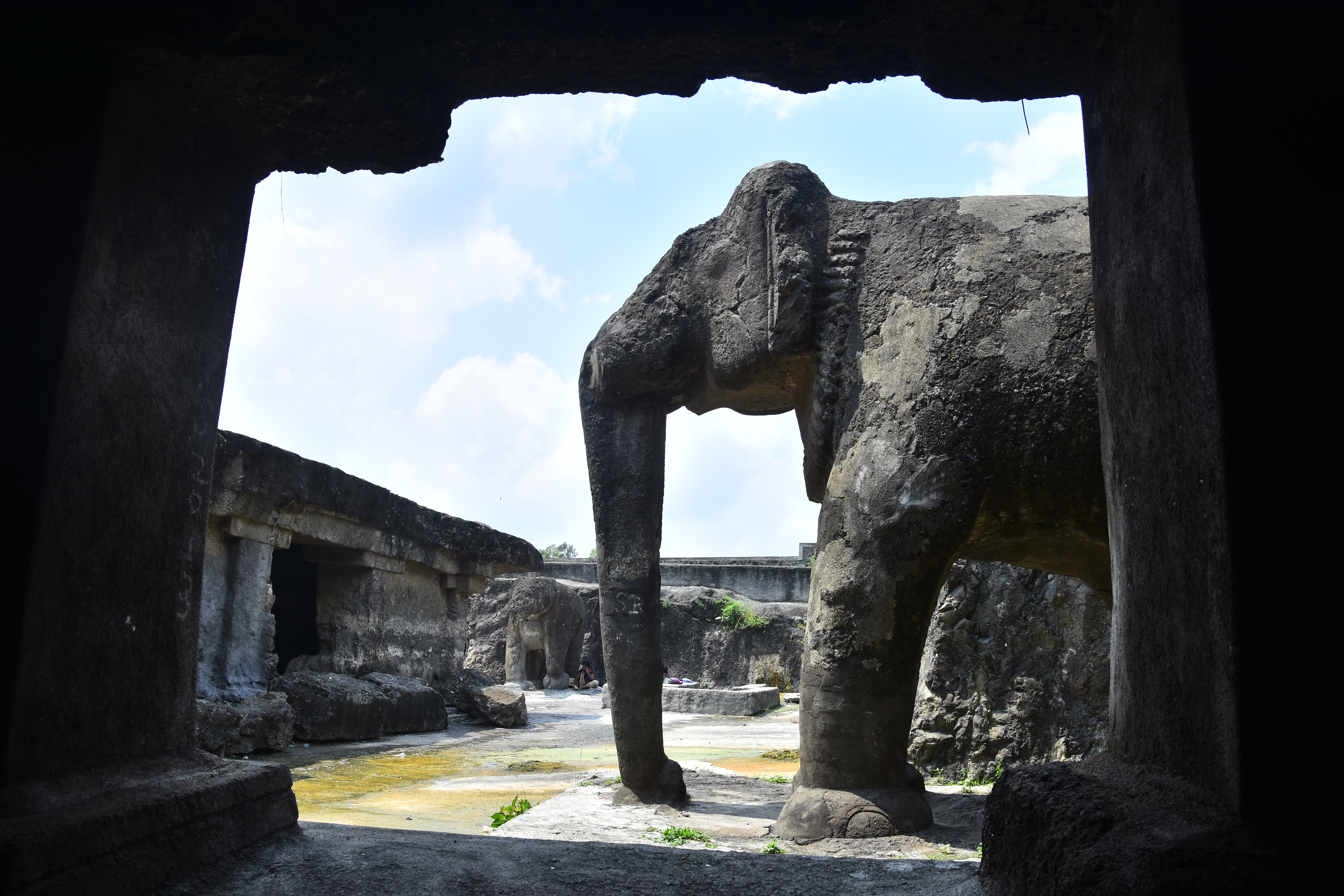
- Top: Kankal Eshwar temple in Beed; Bottom: Hatikhana in Ambajogai
- Interactive map of Beed district
- Country: India
- State: Maharashtra
- Division: Chatrapati Sambhaji Nagar Division
- Headquarters: Beed
- Tehsils: 1. Beed, 2. Ashti, 3. Patoda, 4. Shirur Kasar, 5. Georai, 6. Ambajogai, 7. Wadwani, 8. Kaij, 9. Dharur, 10. Parali, 11. Majalgaon

Government
  - Body: Beed Zilla Parishad
  - Guardian Minister: Sunetra Pawar (Deputy Chief Minister of Maharashtra)
  - President Zilla Parishad: President Mrs.; Vice President Mr.
  - District Collector: Shri. Vivek Johnson, I.A.S
  - CEO Zilla Parishad: Shri. Jithin Rahman , I.A.S
  - MPs: Bajrang Manohar Sonwane (Beed)

Area
  - Total: 10,693 km^{2} (4,129 sq mi)

Population (2011)
  - Total: 2,585,049
  - Density: 241.75/km^{2} (626.13/sq mi)
  - Urban: 17.91%
- Time zone: UTC+05:30 (IST)
- PIN Code(s): 431xxx
- Vehicle registration: MH 23, MH44
- Official Language: Marathi
- Per capita income(Beed district): INR 1,21,515(2020-21)
- Nominal gross domestic product(Beed district): INR 37,672crores (2020-21)
- Website: beed.nic.in

Beed district (Marathi pronunciation: [biːɖ]) is an administrative district in the state of Maharashtra in India. The district headquarters are located at Beed. The district occupies an area of 10,693 km^{2} and has a population of 2,161,250 of which 17.91% were urban (as of 2001).

== Guardian Minister ==
Guardian Minister Beed
- Emblem of India
- Incumbent; Sunetra Pawar since 31 January 2026
- Style: The Honourable
- Appointer: Chief Minister of Maharashtra
- Term length: 5 years / No time limit
- Website: beed.nic.in

== History ==
=== History of Maharashtra ===
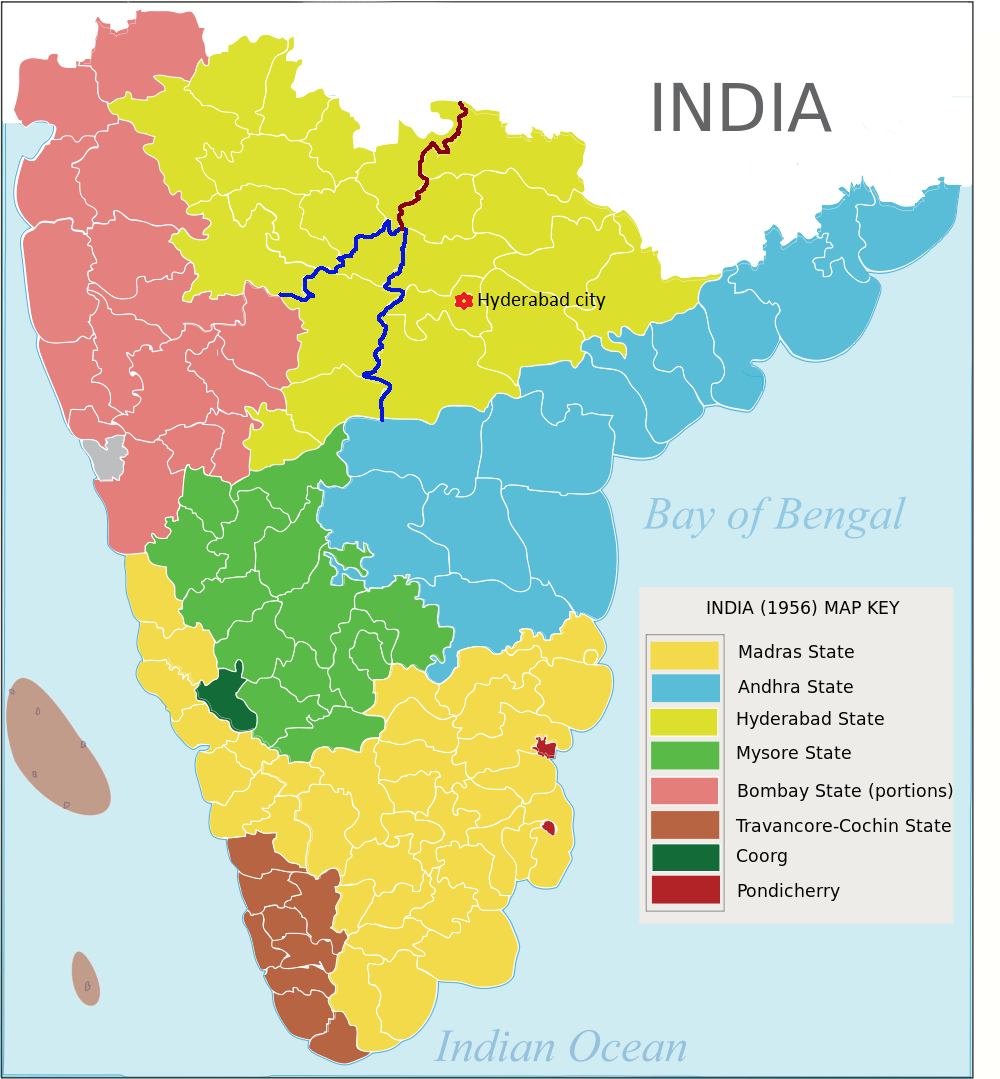
Hyderabad state in 1956 (in yellowish green). After reorganization in 1956, Regions of the state west of Red and Blue lines merged with Bombay and Mysore states respectively and rest of the state (Telangana) was merged with Andhra State to form the state of Andhra Pradesh.

Beed district has a long history of many rulers and kingdoms. In the ancient era, this city was called as Bhir. The city still proudly shows some old monuments, showing the signs of past glory in the form of many city entry doors (called Ves or Darwaza in local language) and city protection walls. Until the 1st of May 1960, this part of Marathwada was under Hyderabad State, but was later included into the Indian Republic after a fierce struggle between Indian Government and Nizam soldiers (Razakars). as The name of Bhir is given by Mohammad Tughlaq.

== Demographics ==
Historical population
Year	Pop.	±% p.a.
1901	481,140	—
1911	606,104	+2.34%
1921	453,844	−2.85%
1931	616,675	+3.11%
1941	691,946	+1.16%
1951	784,920	+1.27%
1961	949,673	+1.92%
1971	1,223,694	+2.57%
1981	1,412,990	+1.45%
1991	1,822,072	+2.58%
2001	2,161,250	+1.72%
2011	2,585,049	+1.81%

Religions in Beed district (2011)
Religion	Percent
Hinduism	84.12%
Islam	12.39%
Buddhism	2.65%
Other or not stated	0.84%

According to the 2011 census Beed district has a population of 2,585,049, roughly equal to the nation of Kuwait or the US state of Nevada. This gives it a ranking of 160th in India (out of a total of 640). The district has a population density of 242 inhabitants per square kilometre (630/sq mi) . Its population growth rate over the decade 2001-2011 was 19.65%. Beed has a sex ratio of 912 females for every 1000 males. 19.90% of the population live in urban areas. Scheduled Castes and Scheduled Tribes make up 13.59% and 1.27% of the population respectively.

Languages in Beed district (2011)
1. Marathi (83.4%)
2. Urdu (8.62%)
3. Hindi (3.93%)
4. Lambadi (2.53%)
5. Others (1.54%)

At the time of the 2011 Census of India, 83.38% of the population in the district spoke Marathi, 8.62% Urdu, 3.93% Hindi and 2.37% Lambadi as their first language.

== Economy ==
Agriculture is the main business in Beed, and it is largely dependent on monsoon rain. Beed also is a district which provides a large number sugarcane cutters. A large area of Beed is Rocky and hilly especially the Georai, Ashti, Ambajogai, Kaij and Patoda Taluka, these are the places where custard apple is cultivated.

== Geographical indication ==
Beed Custard Apple was awarded the Geographical Indication (GI) status tag from the Geographical Indications Registry, under the Union Government of India, on 31 May 2016 valid upto 25 August 2024.

Balaghat Sitaphal Sangh from Dharur, proposed the GI registration of Beed Custard Apple. After filing the application in August 2014, the Custard Apple was granted the GI tag in 2016 by the Geographical Indication Registry in Chennai, making the name "Beed Custard Apple" exclusive to the Custard Apple grown in the region. It thus became the first Custard Apple variety from India and the 19th type of goods from Maharashtra to earn the GI tag.

The prestigious GI tag, awarded by the GI registry, certifies that a product possesses distinct qualities, adheres to traditional production methods, and has earned a reputation rooted in its geographical origin.

== Divisions ==
This district is divided into eleven talukas (or tehsils). These are:

1. Beed
2. Ashti
3. Gevrai
4. Ambajogai
5. Kaij
6. Parali (Vaijnath)
7. Majalgaon
8. Patoda
9. Shirur Kasar
10. Wadwani
11. Dharur

== Officer ==
=== Members of Parliament ===
- Bajrang Manohar Sonwane (NCPSP)
  (Beed)

==== list of Guardian Minister ====
Name	Term of office
Pankaja Munde	31 October 2014 - 8 November 2019
Dhananjay Munde	9 January 2020 - 29 June 2022
Atul Save	27 September 2022 - July 2023
Dhananjay Munde	July 2023 - 26 November 2024
Ajit Pawar	18 January 2025 - Incumbent

=== District Magistrate/Collector ===
District Magistrate / Collector Beed
- Emblem of India
- Incumbent; Shri.Vivek Jhonson (IAS)' since 2025
- Residence: At Beed district
- Appointer: Government of Maharashtra
- Term length: No time limit
- Website: beed.gov.in/en/

==== list of District Magistrate / Collector ====
Name	Term of office
Shri. Vivek Jhonson (IAS)	2025 - Incumbent

== Villages ==
- Amalner Bhandyache
- Chaklamba
- Chanai
- Chousala
- Devthana
- Dhangar Jawalka
- Dharmapuri
- Dhondrai
- Dindrud
- Gadhi
- Ghatnandur
- Hatkarwadi
- Jamb
- Kada
- Khalapuri
- Kusalamb
- Lokhandi Sawargav
- Neknoor
- Patrud
- Raimoha
- Rajuri Navgan
- Sirsala
- Talwada
- Talwat Borgaon
- Telgav

== See also ==
- Tourism in Marathwada
