= Kaij =

- Taluka
- Location in Maharashtra, India
- Coordinates: 18°42′N 76°05′E
- Country: India
- State: Maharashtra
- District: Beed

Government
  - Type: Municipal Council (C grade)
  - Body: Kaij Shahar Nagar Panchayt

Languages
  - Official: Marathi
- Time zone: UTC+5:30 (IST)
- PIN: 431123
- Area code: 02445
- Vehicle registration: MH-44
- Website: www.beed.nic.in

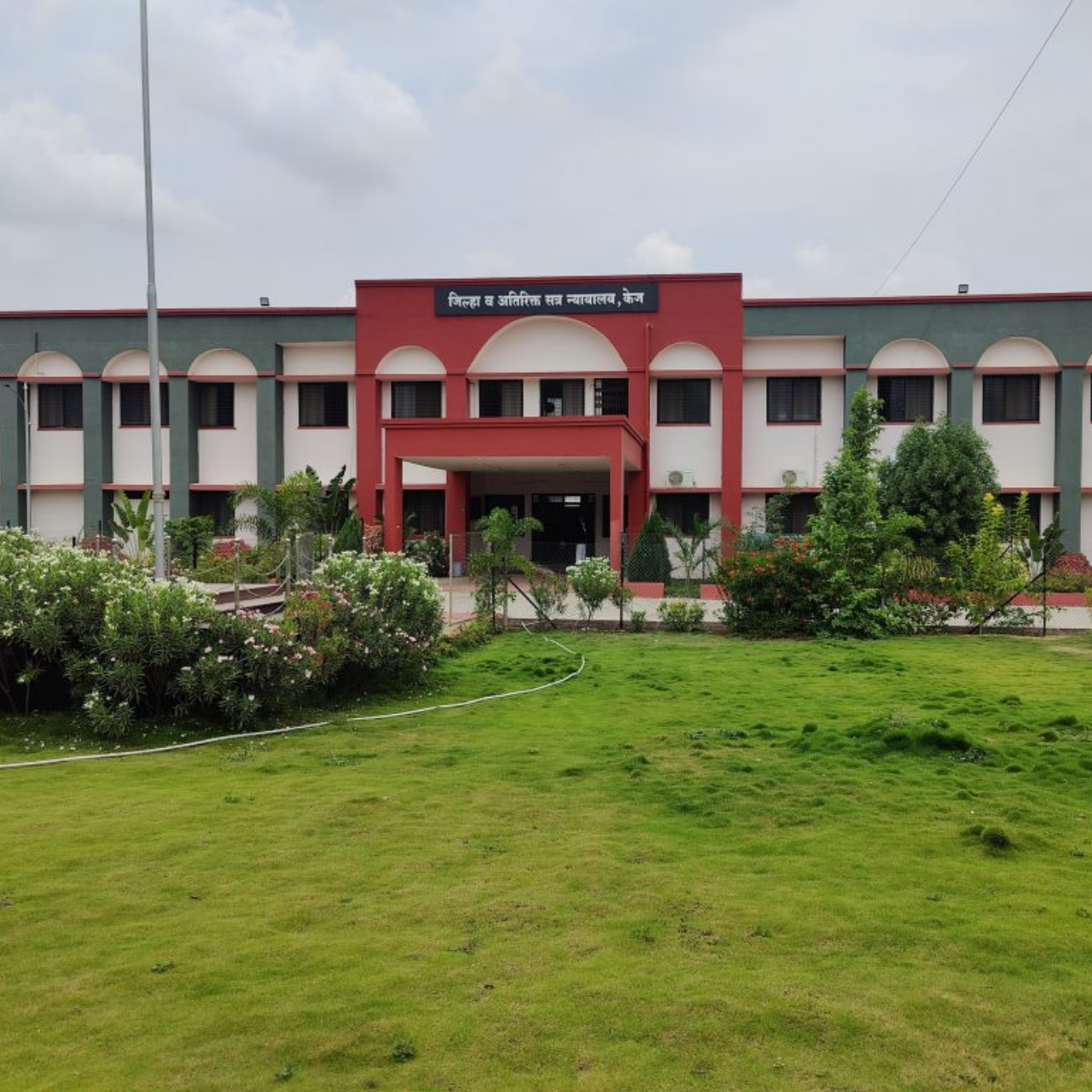
District and Sessions Court, Kaij

Kaij is a tehsil in the Beed district of Maharashtra, India. It is located approximately 32.19 km (20 miles) west of Ambejogai. It serves as the headquarters of the Kaij taluka and is known for its historical, religious, and administrative significance.

== History and geography ==
Kaij has a rich historical heritage and is known for its religious diversity. Geographically, it lies in the Marathwada region of Maharashtra, known for its semi-arid climate. The town's landscape is dotted with ancient temples and dargahs, showcasing a blend of Hindu and Islamic architectural styles.

== Demographics ==
According to the 1961 Census, Kaij had a population of 5,430. The town has grown significantly since then, becoming an important hub in the Beed district.

Aspect	Details
Population (2011)	30,704
Male Population	16,208
Female Population	14,496
Child Population (0-6)	4,097 (13.34% of total population)
Female Sex Ratio	894 (Below state average of 929)
Child Sex Ratio	801 (Below state average of 894)
Literacy Rate	85.21% (Higher than state average of 82.34%)
Households	6,148
Estimated Population (2024)	~42,000
Scheduled Castes (SC)	18.62%
Scheduled Tribes (ST)	1.21%
Total Working Population	10,179
Male Workers	7,384
Female Workers	2,795

== Administration and infrastructure ==
Kaij several government offices, including the tahsildar's office, the panchayat samiti office, and both criminal and civil courts. The town also has civil dispensaries and a poultry farming center. Educational facilities include primary schools, a high school, and a vasti grha (boarding facility).

== Places of religious and historical interest ==
- Uddhav Swami Samadhi

The samadhi of Uddhav Swami, a favorite disciple of Saint Ramdas Swami, is located at the center of Kaij. Constructed in 1797 by the Deshpande family of Kaij, the samadhi is housed in a 10' x 10' math and features a hall supported by four pillars. The site hosts an annual utsav (festival) during Caitra Suddha Pratipada, funded by the Deshpande family.

- Balaji Mandir

Located in the eastern part of Kaij, this temple is dedicated to Lord Balaji. Built by Balakrishna Maharaj, the temple features a 30' x 30' mandap supported by wooden pillars and a sanctum adorned with five arches. The temple also houses idols of Lakshmi, Vyankatesh, and Gopalkrishna.

- Khvaja Mazubuddin Dargah

Situated on the outskirts of Kaij, this dargah is an architectural marvel built by the grandson of Qutbuddin. It features a courtyard surrounded by a parapet wall and a protective double wall with arched entrances. The dargah houses the tombs of Khvaja Mazubuddin, his wife, and his son Saif-ud-din. An urus is held annually on the 6th of Rabi-ul-Awwal, drawing over 3,000 devotees.

== Notable ==
- Rajani Ashokrao Patil
