= T. P. Lahane =

Indian eye surgeon (born 1957)

Tatyarao P. Lahane
- Born: 12 February 1957 (age 69)
- Occupation: Ophthalmologist
- Employer(s): J.J. Hospital Mumbai, India
- Known for: World record of Cataract surgeries
- Term: 2017
- Honours: Padma Shri (2008)

Tatyarao Pundlikrao Lahane (born 12 February 1957) is an Indian eye surgeon and ophthalmologist, Medical College. He served as the Dean of Grant Medical College and J. J. Hospital, Mumbai, and set a world record with more than 162,000 cataract surgeries. He was awarded Padma Shri award in 2008, the 4th highest civilian award in India.

== Early life and education ==
Lahane was born in Makegaon village, Renapur taluka, Latur district of Maharashtra state in a farmer's family on 12 February 1957 to father Pundlikrao and mother Anjanabai. He is one of seven children of the couple. At a young age, both of his kidneys were not functioning and his mother donated one of her kidneys to him.

Lahane completed schooling in Latur and earned his medicine degree in 1981 from the Dr. Babasaheb Ambedkar Marathwada University, Aurangabad. In 1985, he earned his MD in Ophthalmology.

== Career ==
Lahane began his career on 17 May 1985 as a medical officer/ associate professor at the Swami Ramanand Teerth Rural Medical College in Ambajogai, Beed district. During 1993- 94, Lahane worked in Government hospital of Dhule. As an Ophthalmologist he widely lectured about this field and worked in temporary eye-treatment camps in remotest village and trible settlement in the state.

Before Lahane took over as Dean of JJ Hospital he was head of the department of ophthalmology at the hospital. As an ophthalmologist he has arranged many cataract camps nationwide and also in JJ Hospital. In 2007 he conducted his 100,000th cataract surgery in JJ Hospital, which was attended by then-Chief Minister of Maharashtra Vilasrao Deshmukh. He is credited for modernizing the ophthalmology department of JJ Hospital.

=== As a Dean ===
Lahane became the Dean of Grant Medical College and Sir Jamshedjee Jeejeebhoy Group of Hospitals in 2010. As a Dean he is credited for modernising the Out Patient Department of JJ Hospital along with computerising the system. He resigned from the post in 2017.

=== Academic career ===
He pioneered advanced phacoemulsification technology within the government sector of Maharashtra so that every patient could take the benefit of the latest techniques of surgery. He has also reached all remote places within Maharashtra through surgical camps to treat patients who are unable to travel to hospital for their ailment. He was promoted to the position of Joint Director in 2017.

=== Other positions ===
Around 2018, Lahane was the program leader of Cataract free Maharashtra project and deputy director of DMER.

At present he is Director, Medical Education & Research, State of Maharashtra, India.

On 1 July 2021, he retired from government service of Maharashtra state's Medical education department.

== Awards ==
Lahane has won several awards for his work, including Athwale Purskar, Karweer Jivan Gaurav Purskar, Utkarsh Krutdnyata Purskar, Latur Gaurav Purskar, Dr. Mulay Smruti Purskar, Dr. DaljeetSinngh Suvarnpadak, Lifetime achievement award, Giants International award and others.

In 2008, Lahane was awarded Padma Shri award in 2008, the 4th highest civilian award in India.

In 2022, he won the Shahu Award.

== Controversies ==
A probe by a committee constituted by the Dean of Grant Medical College found Lahane to be guilty of performing 698 surgeries without government authorisation. The probe was initiated following an indefinite strike by resident doctors at the Grant Medical College in Mumbai against Lahane, and then head of department, Dr. Ragini Parekh in May 2023. The resident doctors alleged that the duo had created an unpleasant working environment and denied the resident doctors opportunities to operate. A previous probe had also found Lahane's son, Sumeet Lahane, to have performed surgeries at the hospital, despite not having held an official position. Sumeet Lahane has also been tainted with allegations of abusive behaviour towards resident doctors; he allegedly attempted to threaten and manipulate resident doctors into withdrawing their complaint against their father..

== In popular culture ==
Dr Tatya Lahane - Angaar...Power is Within, an Indian biographical film on the doctor which released in 2018. Directed by Virag Wankhede and starring Makarand Anaspure in the titular role, it covers his life from early childhood until the organization of the cataract camps.
