= Provisions of the Panchayats (Extension to the Scheduled Areas) Act, 1996 =

244(A)

Parliament of India
- Long title: An Act to provide for the extension of the provisions of Part IX of the Constitution relating to the Panchayats to the Scheduled Areas.
- Citation: No. 40 of 1996
- Territorial extent: Scheduled Areas
- Enacted by: Parliament of India
- Enacted: 24 December 1996
- Status: In force

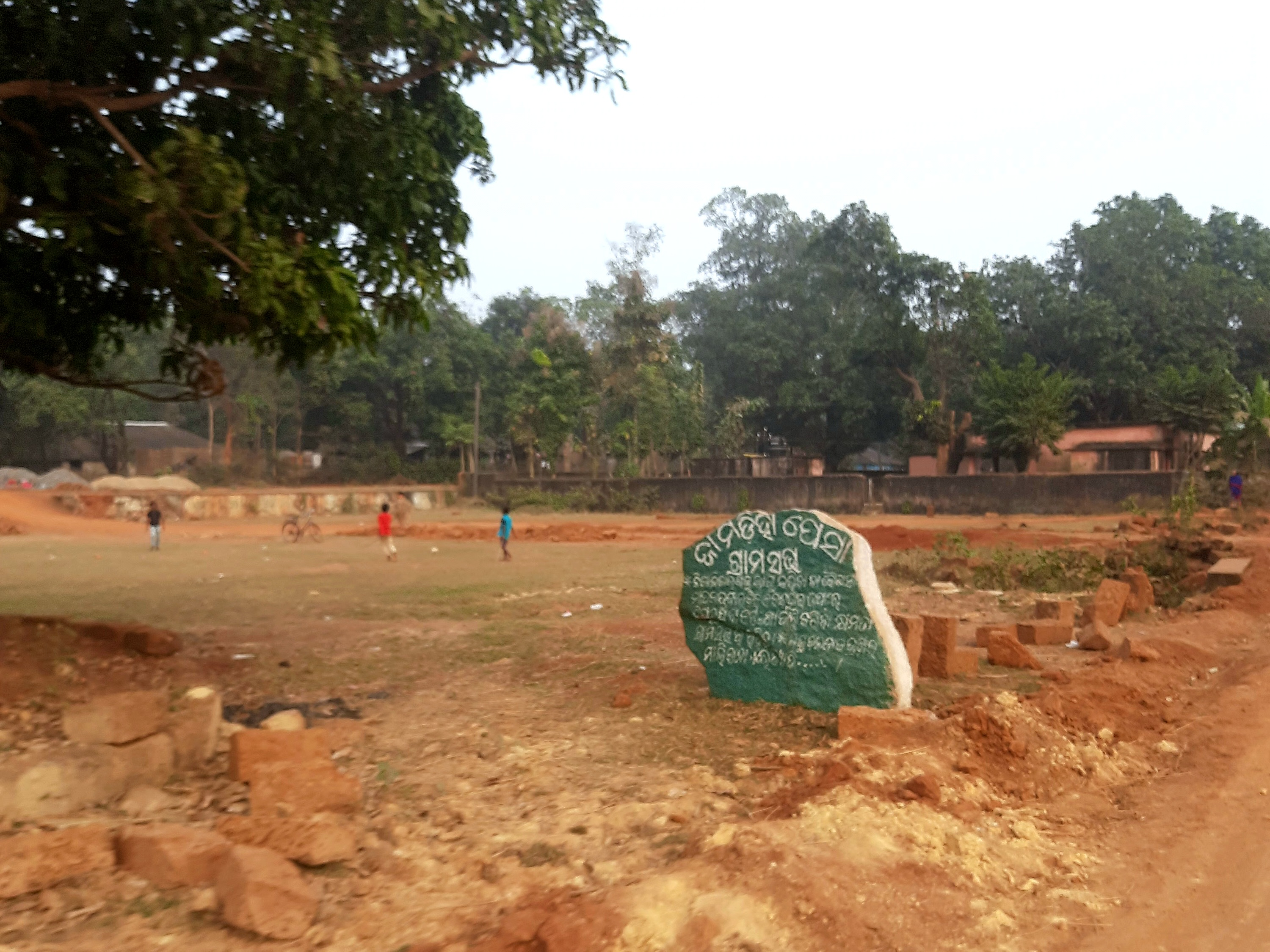
A stone plaque marking the jurisdiction of a village governed by the PESA Act.

The Provisions of the Panchayats (Extension to the Scheduled Areas) Act, 1996 abbreviated as PESA Act is a law enacted by the Government of India for ensuring self governance through traditional Gram Sabhas for people living in the Scheduled Areas of India. Scheduled Areas are areas identified by the Fifth Schedule of the Constitution of India. Scheduled Areas are found in ten states of India which have predominant population of tribal communities. The Scheduled Areas, were not covered by the 73rd Constitutional Amendment or Panchayati Raj Act of the Indian Constitution as provided in the Part IX of the Constitution. PESA was enacted on 24 December 1996 to extend the provisions of Part IX of the Constitution to Scheduled Areas, with certain exceptions and modifications.

PESA sought to enable the Panchayats at appropriate levels and Gram Sabhas to implement a system of self-governance with respect to a number of issues such as customary resources, minor forest produce, minor minerals, minor water bodies, selection of beneficiaries, sanction of projects, and control over local institutions. PESA is an Act to provide for the extension of the provisions of Part IX of the Constitution relating to the Panchayats and the Scheduled Areas. PESA was viewed as a positive development for tribal communities in Scheduled Areas who had earlier suffered tremendously from engagement with modern development processes and from the operation of both colonial laws and statutes made in independent India. The loss of access to forest land, and other community resources had increased their vulnerability. Rampant land acquisition and displacement due to development projects had led to largescale distress in tribal communities living in Scheduled Areas. PESA was seen as a panacea for many of these vulnerabilities and sought to introduce a new paradigm of development where the tribal communities in such Scheduled Areas were to decide by themselves the pace and priorities of their development.

== Definition ==
“Scheduled Areas” mean the Scheduled Areas as referred to in Clause (1) of Article 244 of the Constitution. The Fifth Schedule of the Constitution of India, which mentions Scheduled Areas, is termed as a "Constitution within a Constitution". The Act extended the provisions of Panchayats to the tribal areas of ten states that have Fifth Schedule Areas.

== Rules ==
In order to ensure that PESA would be implemented, functional guidelines in the form of PESA rules are absolutely necessary. However, the lack of interest of state governments in publishing PESA rules impacted PESA adversely. In the past few years four states have been able to publish PESA Rules. Andhra Pradesh was the first state to publish the rules in 2011, 15 years after the promulgation of PESA. Himachal Pradesh, Rajasthan, Telangana, Gujarat, Chhattisgarh, Madhya Pradesh and Maharashtra have also published their PESA Rules. The remaining two states, Jharkhand and Odisha, have not yet framed PESA rules, though Jharkhand has floated a draft for public consultation.

== Role of governors in Scheduled Areas and in implementation of PESA ==
PESA is implemented in Scheduled Areas. The Scheduled Areas are governed by the provisions of the Fifth schedule of the Constitution. The Fifth schedule gives to the governors of the ten scheduled area states very important functions. While, constitutionally, in most matters of governance the governors are aided and advised by the Council of Ministers, it may not be so in matters concerning the Scheduled Areas. As per para 3 of the Fifth Schedule "the Governor of each State having Scheduled Areas therein shall annually, or whenever so required by the President, make a report to the President regarding the administration of the Scheduled Areas in that State and the executive power of the Union shall extend to the giving of directions to the State as to the administration of the said areas."

The Attorney General had advised the Home Ministry that the role of the governor in sending this report is discretionary. An even more significant role of the Governor in scheduled areas arises out of the powers inherent in sub-para (1) of Para 5 of the Fifth Schedule. As per the sub-Para "5. Law applicable to Scheduled Areas.—(1) Notwithstanding anything in this Constitution, the Governor may by public notification direct that any particular Act of Parliament or of the Legislature of the State shall not apply to a Scheduled Area or any part thereof in the State or shall apply to a Scheduled Area or any part thereof in the State subject to such exceptions and modifications as he may specify in the notification and any direction given under this sub-paragraph may be given so as to have retrospective effect." It has been alleged that Governors of most states have not been able to send all reports on time and the content of the reports also does not do justice to this Constitutional responsibility.

The above provision gives to the Governor of a Schedule Areas a very significant power "notwithstanding anything in the Constitution". This power, unlike the power in sub-para (2) of Para 5 (regulation making powers) is bound neither by the advice of the Tribes Advisory Council or the assent of the President. The provision lays down the responsibility on the Governor to ensure that laws that are contrary to the interests of Scheduled Areas may be suitably modified. However, it has been alleged that Governors of Scheduled Areas (barring a few exception ) have hardly ever used these powers independently. There have been also demands that the Reports prepared by the Governors should be made public. However, recently Maharashtra Governor has issued a number of notifications to bring the state subject laws in line with PESA and to guarantee minor forest produce to Gram Sabha. Certain steps have also been taken to ensure peace and good governance in such areas.

A 'Group of Governors on the Areas under Schedule V of the Constitution and Related Issues'- was constituted by President Pranab Mukherjee, included Governors of Andhra Pradesh, Chhattisgarh, Gujarat, Himachal Pradesh, Jharkhand, Odisha, Rajasthan and Madhya Pradesh, with Governor of Maharashtra and Minister of Tribal Affairs, Government of India - as special invitees. The Group recommended a number of interventions such as constitution of a Tribes Advisory Council in Schedule V States on a uniform pattern, drafting of a uniform model for Tribal Sub Plan Budget Allocations, making TSP allocations non transferable and non lapsable, declaring all TSP districts as 'High Priority Districts' under National Rural Health Mission, protecting land rights of tribal communities, etc. The Prime Minister of India in the Conference of Governors held in 2013 advised the Governors of Fifth scheduled States to use their Fifth schedule powers and to implement PESA effectively.

== Implementation of PESA in Maharashtra and Role of Governor under the Fifth Schedule ==
A number of steps have been taken in the past few years by the Governor of Maharashtra to fulfil his mandate under the Fifth Schedule and to ensure implementation of PESA in Maharashtra.

A. Change in Village definition in Maharashtra Village Panchayats Act:

Since the hamlets and habitations in Scheduled Areas are dispersed and ar apart from each other, section 4 (b) of PEA recognised the right of such habitations to become a village and to have their own Gram Sabhas. Accordingly, Maharashtra Government, by Notification dated 25/06/2014, inserted in chapter III-A of the Maharashtra Village Panchayats Act, special provisions relating to Village and Gram Sabha, namely:

"54-1A. Notwithstanding anything contained in sections 4, 5 or any other provisions of this Act, in the Scheduled Areas, - (a) a habitation or a group of habitations or a hamlet or a group of hamlets comprising a community and managing its affairs in accordance with traditions and customs, and which is declared as a village in the prescribed manner shall be the village for the purposes of this chapter;

"(b) every village, so declared under clause (a), shall have a 'Gram Sabha' consisting of persons whose names are included in the electoral rolls for the Panchayat at the Village level and a Panchayat may comprise of one or more than one of such villages."

B. Promulgation of PESA Rules for Maharashtra:

In order to ensure that PESA was implemented in letter and spirit, there was also a need to put in place PESA rules in the state. This task had been long pending and was coming in the way of implementation of PESA. However, in March 2014 the State Government finally published PESA rules to ensure detailed directions about the various aspects of PESA.

C. Bringing State Acts in conformity with PESA

Changes were required in various State Acts of Maharashtra State to bring them in conformity with PESA. This was necessary as PESA requires its implementation through the Panahayati Raj Act of the State and the State subject laws. By a series of notifications the Governor of Maharashtra ensured that most of these state legislations were brought in line with PESA. Many of the above Acts have been modified and brought in line with PESA by Notifications issued by the present Governor of Maharashtra Shri Ch. Vidyasagar Rao and the earlier Governor Shri Sankarnarayanan.

D. Notifications issued by the Governor of Maharashtra under sub-para (1) of Para 5 :

Under sub-paragraph (1) of paragraph 5 of the Fifth Schedule of the Constitution of India, the Governor may by Public Notification direct that any particular Act of Parliament or of the Legislature of the State shall not apply to a Scheduled Area or any part thereof in the State or shall apply to a Scheduled Area or any part thereof in the state subject to the exceptions and modifications specified in the notification. In exercise of these powers, the Governor of Maharashtra has issued various notifications for welfare of tribal communities in Scheduled Areas.

1. Notification under sub-para (1) of Para 5 ensuring ownership of minor forest produce, including Bamboo and Tendu

The definition of Minor Forest Produce (MFP) under the Maharashtra Transfer of Ownership of Minor Forest Produce in the Scheduled Areas and the Maharashtra Minor Forest Produce (Recognition of Trade) (Amendment) Act, 1997 did not include many of the minor forest produce recognized under the subsequent the Scheduled Tribes and other Traditional Forest Dwellers (Recognition of Forest Rights) Act, 2006, (FRA). Hence, despite the powers vested in them under PESA, the Gram sabhas were not able to access many important MFPs such as Tendu and Bamboo. In fact, the list included in the state subject law pertained to only 33 low value MFPs. This anomaly had led to denial of livelihood opportunities to Village Communities in the Scheduled Areas, primarily the members of the Scheduled Tribes. By Notification dated 19/08/2014, the Governor of Maharashtra made modifications to the Maharashtra Transfer of Ownership of Minor Forest Produce in the Scheduled Areas and the Maharashtra Minor Forest Produce (Regulation of trade) (Amendment) Act, 1997 and modifications to the Indian Forest Act, 1927, in its application to the State of Maharashtra.

Because of these changes many Gram Sabhas in Scheduled Areas have been able to exercise their rights over minor forest produce, including high value products, such as bamboo and tendu. Using these rights in consonance with FRA, more than 100 Gram Sabhas in Gadchiroli have exercised for the first time their rights over bamboo and more than 500 have exercised their rights over tendu and earned income ranging from 10 lakh to 80 lakh per Gram Sabha, leading to a positive impact in the Left-Wing Extremist (LWE) affected district.

2. Notification regarding prevention of land alienation by Gram Sabhas through modification to the Maharashtra Land Revenue Code, 1966:

The Scheduled Areas are often plagued with land alienation from tribal persons to non-tribal persons. The tribal communities have been steadily losing land in scheduled Areas and their population vis-a-vis non-tribal persons is dwindling in such areas. Land alienation in such areas occurs because of various reasons such as threat, coercion, fraud, forgery, and the general indebtedness of tribal persons to money-lenders. In order to bring the state revenue laws in line with section 4(m)(iii) of PESA, 1996, in exercise of powers conferred by sub paragraph (1) of paragraph 5 of the Fifth Schedule to the Constitution, by Notification dated 14/06/2016, the Governor of Maharashtra directed that section 36 A of the Maharashtra Land Revenue Code, 1966, in its application to the Scheduled Areas of the State of Maharashtra shall apply with the modifications mentioned in the said Notification and that no land can be alienated in Scheduled Areas without the prior consent of the Gram Sabhas.

3. Notifications under sub-para (1) of Para 5 of Fifth Schedule bringing certain State Acts in consonance with PESA

The Provisions of the Panchayats (Extension to the Scheduled Areas) Act, 1996 (40 of 1996) had been enacted with intention of extending the provisions of Part IX of the Constitution relating to the Panchayats to the Scheduled Areas, and to ensure a large degree of self-governance to the appropriate Panchayats and the Gram Sabhas in the Scheduled Areas. Since the provisions of PESA also requires that all the State Acts shall ensure that the appropriate Panchayats and Gram Sabhas are endowed with a number of powers outlined in the said Act, it is expedient to bring certain State Acts in consonance with the PESA. Therefore, in exercise of the powers conferred by sub-paragraph (1) of paragraph 5 of the Fifth Schedule to the Constitution of India, by Notification dated 30/10/2014, Governor of Maharashtra Shri Ch. Vidyasagar Rao directed that the Markets and Fairs Act, 1862 (Bom. IV of 1862), Indian Forest Act, 1927 (16 of 1927), in its application to the State of Maharashtra, the Maharashtra Village Panchayats Act (III of 1959), the Maharashtra Land Revenue Code, 1966 and the Water (Prevention and Control of Pollution) Act, 1974 (6 of 1974) in its application to the State of Maharashtra, shall apply to the Scheduled Areas with the exceptions and modifications mentioned in the said Notification. By the notification, a special chapter was introduced in the Indian Forest Act, 1927 to ensure the rights of the minor forest produce of Gram Sabhas was carried out without any hindrance. All decisions about collection, sale and sharing of income proceeds are now taken by Gram Sabhas. The definition of social sector in the Maharashtra Village Panchayats Act was also amended so that all line departments dealing in social sector could also be reviewed by the Panchayati Raj sector.

E. Guidelines regarding Bamboo cutting and selling through Gram Sabha:

As per the Notification dated 19/08/2014, Bamboo has been added in the list of Minor Forest Produce in Scheduled Areas. In pursuance to this Notification, the Rural Development Department by Government Resolution dated 31/03/2015 and 23/11/2015 has issued guidelines regarding Bamboo cutting and selling through Gram Sabhas.

F. Seed capital from Manav Vikas Mission to ensure meaningful access to Minor Forest Produce: Planning Department by Government Resolution dated 21/08/2014 and 01/08/2016 has issued instructions to make available the one-time seed capital to the Gram Sabhas for this purpose through MVM.

G. Direct devolution of 5% of Tribal Sub Plan fund to Gram Panchayats

By Notification dated 30/10/2014, the Maharashtra Village Panchayats Act (III of 1959) has been modified. A new clause (o) in section 54 B is inserted that Gram Panchayats and Gram Sabhas shall " be competent to exercise control over local plans and resources for such plan including the Tribal Sub Plan, provided that not less than 5% of the total Tribal Sub Plan funds of the respective annual plan shall be devolved to the Gram Panchayats in Scheduled Areas in proportion to their population." In pursuance to this Notification, a Government Resolution has been issued on 21 April 2015 and then on 21 August 2015 by Tribal Development Department regarding direct devolution of 5% of Tribal Sub Plan funds to Gram Panchayats in Scheduled Areas of Maharashtra State. This step is significant as it ensures a greater degree of democratic decentralization in such areas.

== PESA in 6 state ==
A Planning Commission Report concluded that "in most cases, in the pre-PESA implementation phase, there was little if any difference between tribal and non-tribal areas with respect to the role of the Gram Sabha. The Sarpanch and other influential Gram Panchayat members dominate the often irregular and scantily attended Gram Sabha meetings. The common people possess little awareness about its functioning." The report recommended awareness generation among the tribal community on the provisions provided in PESA Act. The report also noted that there has been " absolutely no groundwork in recognising the Gram Sabha’s jurisdiction over forests and in the creation of adequate mechanisms and support structures for them to play any significant role. ...• The advent of PESA in 1996 was a welcome event that conferred relatively greater autonomy to Gram Sabhas. However, PESA’s sincere implementation has not been seriously attempted by the government, which is still dominated by centralized structures and laws that are in contradiction with the progressive provisions of PESA. For example, the provisions, as explained in the Act, related to people’s control over livelihood resources have yet to be executed in the scheduled areas. In a few places, since the appearance of PESA, an attempt has been made to restore control over the village resources to the people. Following these efforts, people have faced sometimes violent reactions from the ruling class. As such, conflicting areas were identified prior to advocating the implementation of various provisions of PESA." The Planning Commission report noted that "there are policy loopholes between self-governance laws and existing laws that give power to various departments to control resources, and many other functions that Panchayats are supposed to manage by themselves (as per the provisions of PESA). For example, the modern state and its legal apparatus do not recognise the customary ownership rights of land, which are by and large unwritten in the tribal community. Therefore, if tribal communities cannot exercise ownership rights in their traditional fashion, the spirit behind the provision in PESA of managing land resources by Gram Sabhas is defeated. So more focused and nuanced work should be done in this regards...... Similar conflict is prevalent with regard to ownership rights of water resources. Most village ponds are either on community land, revenue land or forestland. Under existing conditions, local people are either prohibited or have restricted use of these ponds. Hence there is some overlapping of ownership rights, and clarity on such issues is possible only after the Indian Forest Act and other related Acts are amended to accommodate the provisions of PESA."

The report lamented the fact that "the situation regarding forest resources is still worse, as forests have been under total control of the Department of Forests until now. Years of autocratic control over the profit-yielding forest resources have made the Department reluctant to yield control over forests. It is this very attitude, along with an absence of Amendments in the Indian Forest Act, which is in conflict with the provisions of PESA and this problem could be solved in a war footing manner."

== Scheduled Areas and Samatha judgement ==
The Samatha judgment of the Supreme Court in 1997 was a landmark judicial intervention in scheduled Areas and PESA. "Samata first filed a case in the local courts and later in the High Court in 1993 against the Government of A.P for leasing tribal lands to private mining companies in the scheduled areas. The High Court dismissed the case after which Samata filed a Special Leave Petition in the Supreme Court of India. A four- year battle led to a historic judgement in July 1997 by a three judge-bench. The Court in its final verdict, declared that ‘person’ would include both natural persons as well as juristic person and constitutional government and that all lands leased by the government or its agencies to private mining companies apart from its instrumentalities in the scheduled areas are null and void. In addition it also held that transfer of land to the government or its instrumentalities is entrustment of public property as the aim of public corporations is in public interest and hence such transfers stand upheld." It is alleged that the Central and State Governments were not sympathetic to the Samatha judgement and tried to scuttle it by challenging it.

However, the Supreme Court dismissed the petitions of State and Central Governments for modification of the Samata order. Simultaneously, the Andhra Pradesh government moved the Tribes Advisory Council for amendment to the Land Transfer Regulation Act of 1959. It is also alleged that the Ministry of Mines circulated a Secret Note to the committee of Secretaries proposing an amendment of the Fifth Schedule to overcome the Samata Judgement to facilitate the leasing of land to outsiders in tribal areas. The Indian Express carried an article in the edit page exposing secret note of Ministry of Mines. The President Shri K R Narayanan in his Republic Day speech issued a veiled warning against plotting to amend the V Schedule of the Constitution. It was also alleged that the Planning Commission had also moved draft notes wanting to do away with the Samatha judgement.

== Land acquisition in Scheduled Areas ==
While section 4 (i) of PESA provides the right to Gram Sabhas to be consulted before land acquisition, more stringent provisions exist in section 41 and 42 of the Right to Fair Compensation and Transparency in Land Acquisition, Rehabilitation and Resettlement Act, 2013 (LARR, in brief).

Unlike PESA, Section 41 of LARR 2013 provides for consent of Gram Sabhas before the process of land acquisition can begin. Section 41 and 42 also provide certain protections just in case the land acquisition is taken up as a last resort.

"41(1) As far as possible, no acquisition of land shall be made in the Scheduled Areas.

(2) Where such acquisition does take place it shall be done only as a demonstrable last resort.

(3) In case of acquisition or alienation of any land in the Scheduled Areas, the prior consent of the concerned Gram Sabha or the Panchayats or the autonomous District Councils, at the appropriate level in Scheduled Areas under the Fifth Schedule to the Constitution, as the case may be, shall be obtained, in all cases of land acquisition in such areas, including acquisition in case of urgency, before issue of a notification under this Act, or any other Central Act or a State Act for the time being in force:

Provided that the consent of the Panchayats or the Autonomous Districts Councils shall be obtained in cases where the Gram Sabha does not exist or has not been constituted.

(4) In case of a project involving land acquisition on behalf of a Requiring Body which involves involuntary displacement of the Scheduled Castes or the Scheduled Tribes families, a Development Plan shall be prepared, in such form as may be prescribed, laying down the details of procedure for settling land rights due, but not settled and restoring titles of the Scheduled Tribes as well as the Scheduled Castes on the alienated land by undertaking a special drive together with land acquisition.

(5) The Development Plan shall also contain a programme for development of alternate fuel, fodder and, non-timber forest produce resources on non-forest lands within a period of five years, sufficient to meet the requirements of tribal communities as well as the Scheduled Castes.

(6) In case of land being acquired from members of the Scheduled Castes or the Scheduled Tribes, at least one-third of the compensation amount due shall be paid to the affected families initially as first installment and the rest shall be paid after taking over of the possession of the land.

(7) The affected families of the Scheduled Tribes shall be resettled preferably in the same Scheduled Area in a compact block so that they can retain their ethnic, linguistic and cultural identity.

(8) The resettlement areas predominantly inhabited by the Scheduled Castes and the Scheduled Tribes shall get land, to such extent as may be decided by the appropriate Government free of cost for community and social gatherings.

(9) Any alienation of tribal lands or lands belonging to members of the Scheduled Castes in disregard of the laws and regulations for the time being in force shall be treated as null and void, and in the case of acquisition of such lands, the rehabilitation and resettlement benefits shall be made available to the original tribal land owners or land owners belonging to the Scheduled Castes.

(10) The affected Scheduled Tribes, other traditional forest dwellers and the Scheduled Castes having fishing rights in a river or pond or dam in the affected area shall be given fishing rights in the reservoir area of the irrigation or hydel projects.

(11) Where the affected families belonging to the Scheduled Castes and the Scheduled Tribes are relocated outside of the district, then, they shall be paid an additional twenty-five per cent, rehabilitation and resettlement benefits to which they are entitled in monetary terms along with a one-time entitlement of fifty thousand rupees.

42. (1) All benefits, including the reservation benefits available to the Scheduled Tribes and the Scheduled Castes in the affected areas shall continue in the resettlement area.

(2) Whenever the affected families belonging to the Scheduled Tribes who are residing in the Scheduled Areas referred to in the Fifth Scheduled or the tribal areas referred to in the Sixth Scheduled to the Constitution are relocated outside those areas, than, all the statutory safeguards, entitlements, and benefits being enjoyed by them under this Act shall be extended to the area to which they are resettled regardless of whether the resettlement area is a Scheduled Area referred to in the said Fifth Schedule or a tribal area referred to in the said Sixth Schedule, or not.

(3) Where the community rights have been settled under the provisions of the Scheduled Tribes and Other Traditional Forest Dwellers (Recognition of Forest Rights) Act, 2006, the same shall be quantified in monetary amount and be paid to the individual concerned who has been displaced due to the acquisition of land in proportion with his share in such community rights."

== PESA, Eleventh Schedule of Constitution and Transfer of 29 subjects to Panchayats at appropriate level and Gram Sabhas ==
The difference between PESA and the PRI structure established under the 73rd Constitutional amendment is that while the 73rd Amendment states that the States "may" transfer the 29 subjects enlisted in the Eleventh Schedule, PESA makes this transfer mandatory at least for those powers which are outlined in Section 4 of PESA, namely: Minor Forest produce, Social Forestry, Land Management, Fisheries, Village Markets, tribal development, Social Justice, Food and Civil Supplies, and subjects related to local institutions. In the absence of the transfer of the 3 Fs, i.e., funds, functions, and functionaries it shall be very difficult to put PESA in operation.

== Scheduled Tribes and Other Traditional Forest Dwellers (Recognition of Forest Rights) Act, 2006 (FRA) ==
Both PESA and FRA are rights-based legislations with certain common ground. While the scope of PESA is limited to Scheduled Areas, FRA extends to all forests. The common string uniting PESA and FRA is the reliance on Gram Sabhas as the unit for decision making. While in PESA it is the Gram sabha which owns MFP, in FRA the rights over MFP are with the STs and the OTFDs. However, these rights are to be exercised as per decisions made by Gram Sabha. In a letter dated 13 February 2015, the Minister of Tribal affairs clarified that there is no conflict between FRA and PESA as far as ownership of MFP is concerned and has called both as "kindred statute". However, one difference between FRA and PESA that can be inferred is that, unlike FRA, the rights over MFP are inherent in statute for all Gram Sabhas without the need to claim rights.

== Scheduled Areas, and the question of tribal land alienation ==
One of the keenest issues that have affected tribal autonomy and welfare is the question of land alienation. After the concept of private ownership of property had been extended to tribal lands by the British, a large number of tribal people lost their land to the wiles of the money-lenders and the influx of outsiders. In the wake of a number of tribal uprisings a number of protective acts were passed most notable of which were Act I of 1959 and 1970 in Andhra Pradesh. However, the loss of land continued unabated despite several land laws across states promulgated for the protection of tribals. PESA was notable in its scope, as by section 4 (m) (iii) it gave to Gram Sabhas the power to not only prevent alienation of land but also to restore illegally alienated land.

== PESA, Scheduled Areas and Part IX A of the Constitution ==
As per article 243 ZC of the Constitution Part IX A of the Constitution relating to urban local bodies shall not be applicable to Scheduled Areas unless Parliament by law makes "Parliament may, by law, extend the provisions of this Part to the Scheduled Areas and the tribal areas referred to in clause (1) subject to such exceptions and modifications as may be specified in such law, and no such law shall be deemed to be an amendment of this Constitution for the purposes of article 368". In pursuance to this requirement, the Municipal Extension to Scheduled Areas Act (MESA) was introduced in Parliament. However, it was never passed. technically, no areas in Scheduled Areas can be converted into a municipality till the Act is passed. it is expected that if and when such an Act is passed it shall through certain modifications in Part IX A of the Constitution provide adequate safeguards for the people of Scheduled Areas.

However, absence of MESA has not prevented many states from creating municipalities leading to much heartburn in scheduled areas and legal challenges. "C R Bijoy of Campaign for Survival and Dignity, a non-profit in Delhi, says state governments are upgrading the panchayati areas within the scheduled area into municipal areas and are taking the areas out of the purview of PESA provisions, which mandate village council’s approval for setting up any project. Worse, they are doing so without providing alternative protective provisions to the municipal areas. This is creating legal infirmity, Bijoy adds. As per the 1991 census, there were 167 urban local bodies in Schedule Five areas. Their number has increased since. Between 2007 and 2009, Chhattisgarh and Madhya Pradesh upgraded 26 and eight tribal rural areas into municipalities, and these are the areas with major industrial investment proposals. Alok Pandey of PRIA, a Delhi-based non-profit that works on local governance, cites another reason for such upgrade. Before the general election of 2009, the Chhattisgarh and Madhya Pradesh governments upgraded 79 and 100 panchayats, respectively. A major reason behind this is to get more Central allocations from the Ministry of Urban Development."

== Home Ministry and PESA in context of LWE states ==
The Home Ministry has stated repeatedly that the implementation of PESA in letter and spirit is very necessary for countering Naxal violence in Left Wing Extremism (LWE) affected States in Scheduled Areas. The Ministry suggests special stress on minor forest produce rights to Gram Sabhas for this purpose. In an answer in the Parliament to a related question on PESA the MoS Home Affairs suggested that good governance and proper functioning of PRI institutions and PESA was central to the strategy to combat LWE violence in the country.

== Celebrations ==
Every year, 24 December is observed as Gaon Ganrajya Divas, also referred to as Gram Sabha Divas or PESA Act Day, in the Indian states of Chhattisgarh and Jharkhand.

== See also ==
- Local self-government in India
- List of Indian federal legislation
- PESA Full Form
