= Shri Keshavraj Vidyalaya, Latur =

School in Latur, Maharashtra, India

Location
- Sham Nagar, Latur, Maharashtra 413531; India

Information
- Motto: केल्याने होत आहे रे । आधी केलेचि पाहिजे।। (It is happening by doing, It should be done first.)
- Established: 1969; 57 years ago
- Educational authority: Bhartiya Shikshan Prasarak Sanstha, Ambajogai
- Principal: Manjuldas Gavte (high school); Shivaji Hendage (primary school)
- Language: Marathi; English
- Affiliations: Maharashtra State Board of Secondary and Higher Secondary Education

Shri Keshavraj Vidyalaya, Latur is a primary and secondary school in the Latur district of South-Eastern Maharashtra, India. It was established in 1969 by Bhartiya Shikshan Prasarak Sanstha, Ambajogai. The School is a Maharashtra State Board of Secondary and Higher Secondary Education syllabus-based school. The Primary teaching-language of school is Marathi. School has also started its English school branch from 2017. School has completed its 50 years successfully in the year 2019. There are 23 schools and institutes under the same "Bhartiya Shikshan Prasarak Sanstha" in different districts of Maharashtra.

== Recognition ==
The Keshavraj Vidyalya is considered as top most school of district Latur. Every year, About 200–300 students score above 90% in the SSC final board exams. School is considered as one of the best schools in Maharashtra. Combining the total number of students and teachers of all branches, the school has over 25000+ students and 1000+ Teachers (As of 2020).

== Facilities ==
The school is most famous for its teaching methodologies, different experiments on students to teach them in a better way, sports and quality education. Each day of school begins with the prayer, national anthem and a bit of exercise. the School has libraries for books, Laboratories for science experiments, Computer Lab for Technology-education, Playground for playing. Various different activities are undertaken by school every year to make students better and to increase their ability to do analytical thinking and problem-solving skills. School also motives students to give National-level exams like BTS, Scholarship, Junior IAS, Math & Science Olympiad, Homi Bhabha, etc.

== Timing ==
The timings of the schools are as follows:

- 7 a.m. to Noon – 1st to 4th std students and 8th to 10th standard students.
- Noon to 5 p.m. – 5th to 7th standard students.

== See also ==
- List of schools in Maharashtra
