= Bardapur =

Village in Maharashtra

- Village
- Location in Maharashtra Bardapur (India)
- Coordinates: 18.639454°N 76.490893°E
- Country: India
- State: Maharashtra
- District: Beed
- Taluka: Ambajogai
- Demonym: Bardapurkar
- Official Language: Marathi

Bardapur is one of the oldest village in Ambajogai taluka of Beed district of Maharashtra. It has one of the oldest police station and is a religious centre. A very old Shiva (Mahadev) temple is in the center of Village. The weather in Bardapur ranges from 16-28-degree Celsius a year
