= Shah Buruj =

Historical tower in Ambajogai, Maharashtra

Coordinates: 18°44′14″N 76°23′26″E

Shah Buruj also known as Laman Buruj, is a historical tower situated in Ambajogai, Maharashtra, India. The tower had a radio installed by the government in 1942. Nizam's troops maintained a permanent base camp. The soldiers were intended to hear the war news, which is why this radio was erected. This news was made available for regular individuals to hear.

== History ==
During the Nizam era, Ambajogai was known by the Nizam name Mominabad. At Ambajogai, Nizam's troops maintained a permanent base. To let the soldiers to hear about the conflict, Ambajogai freedom warrior Srinivas Khot smashed the radio on the Shah Buruj, sparking an uprising against the British and the Nizam. Ambajogai saw a significant movement during that time to liberate Marathwada from the Nizam's authority. Following Mahatma Gandhi's 1942 announcement of Chale Jao (transl. Get out), many of Indians began taking part in the campaign, which spread to several Indian institutions. This is how Swami Ramanand Tirtha and his adherents initiated the Satyagraha movement in Hyderabad. Some instructors and students from the Yogeshwari New Vidyalaya, which Swamiji revived in Ambajogai, participated in this campaign after being inspired by this Satyagraha. Slogans against the Nizam and the British, Vande Mataram and Jai Hind slogans, slogan painting on walls, ransacking mail boxes in post offices, severing phone and light wires, and demolishing radio station centers were some of the ways that symbolic agitation was carried out.

The flag was hoisted on the tower for the first time in 2022. On this occasion, tributes were paid to the martyrs of Marathwada Liberation Day.
