= BSPS =

BSPS may refer to:

- British Society for the Philosophy of Science, philosophical society based in the United Kingdom
- Bhartiya Shikshan Prasarak Sanstha, Indian Educational institution
- British Show Pony Society, British organisation
- Bell System Practices (BSPs), compilation of technical publications which describes the best methods of engineering, constructing, installing, and maintaining the telephone plant of the Bell System under direction of AT&T and Bell Telephone Laboratories
