= Marathwada =

Region of Maharashtra, India

Coordinates: 19.8833°N 75.3333°E

- Geographical region
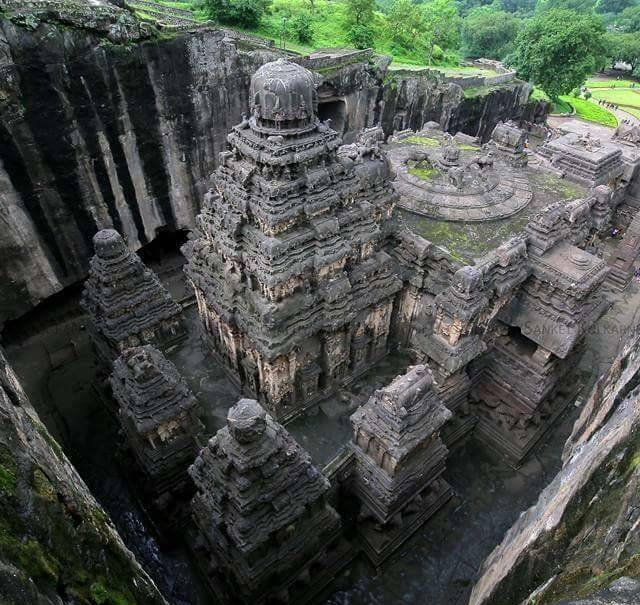
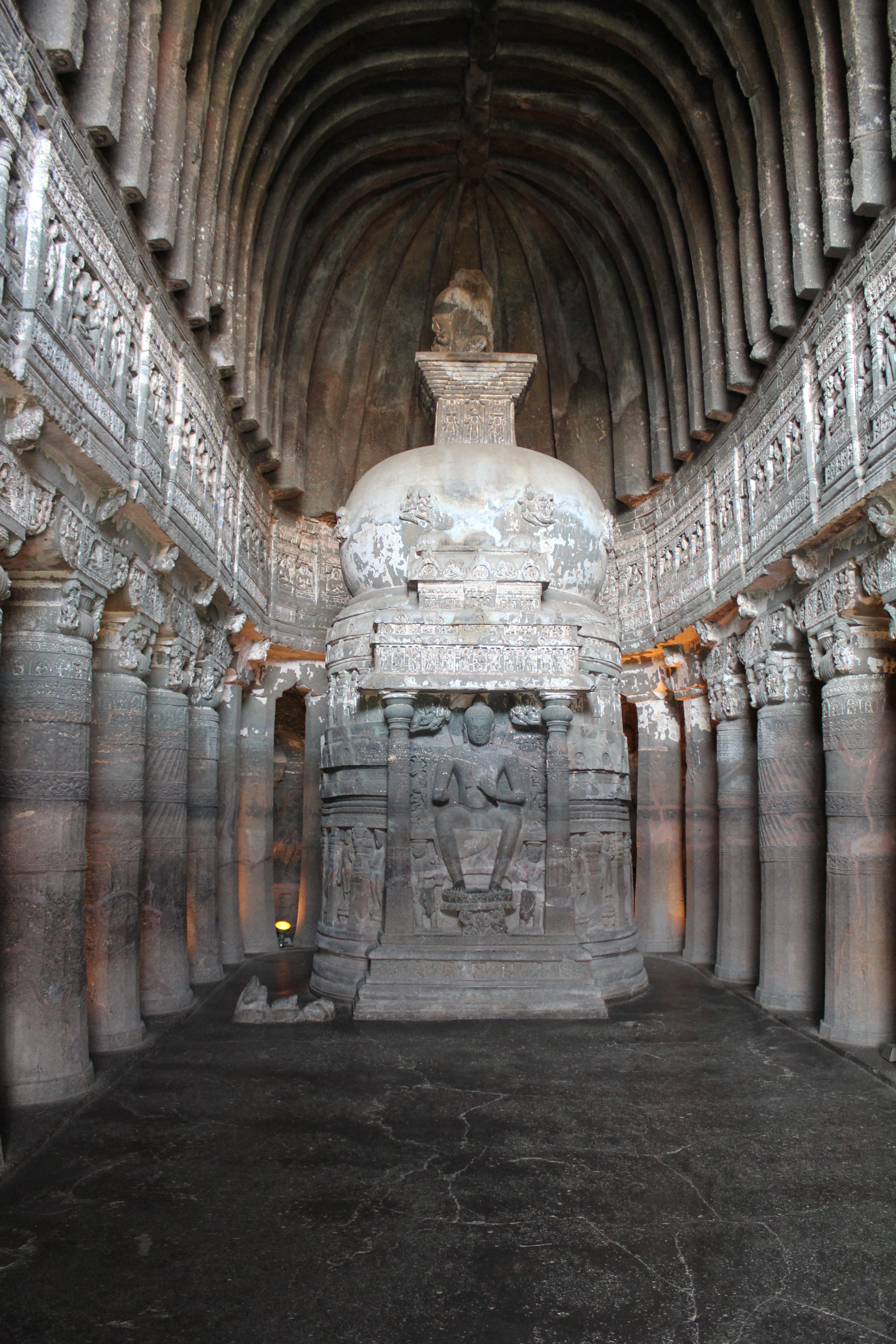
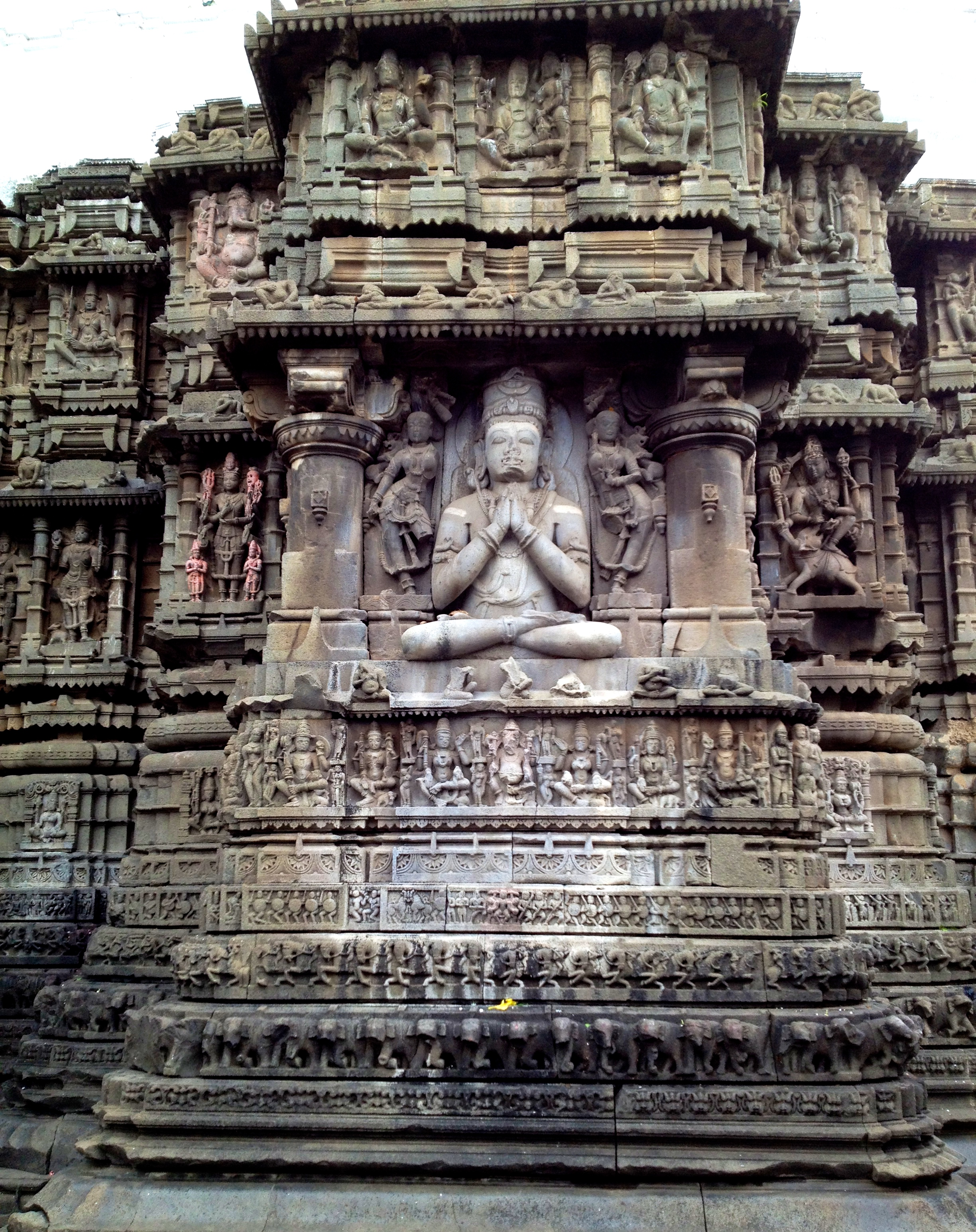
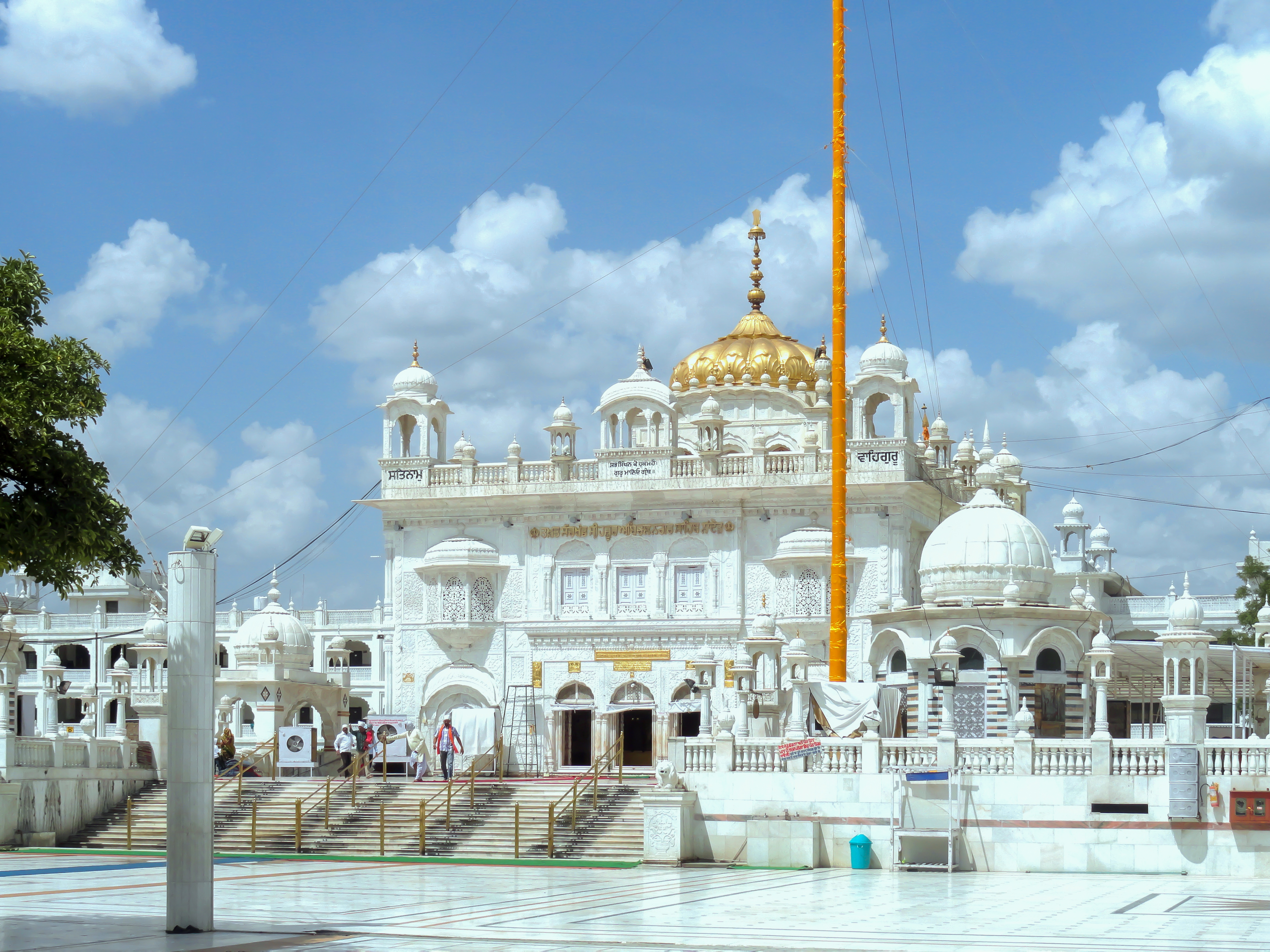
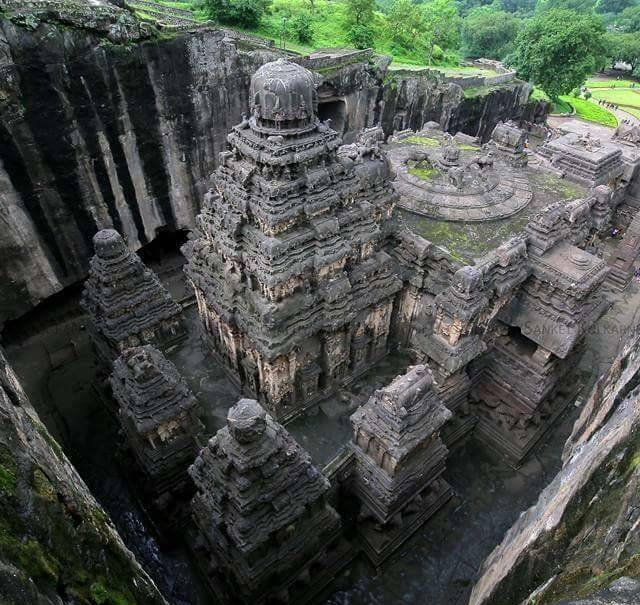
- Clockwise from top : Kailasa Temple, Aundha Nagnath Temple, Kailasa Temple, Shri Hazoor Sahib Gurudwara, Chaitya Griha or prayer hall at Ajanta Caves

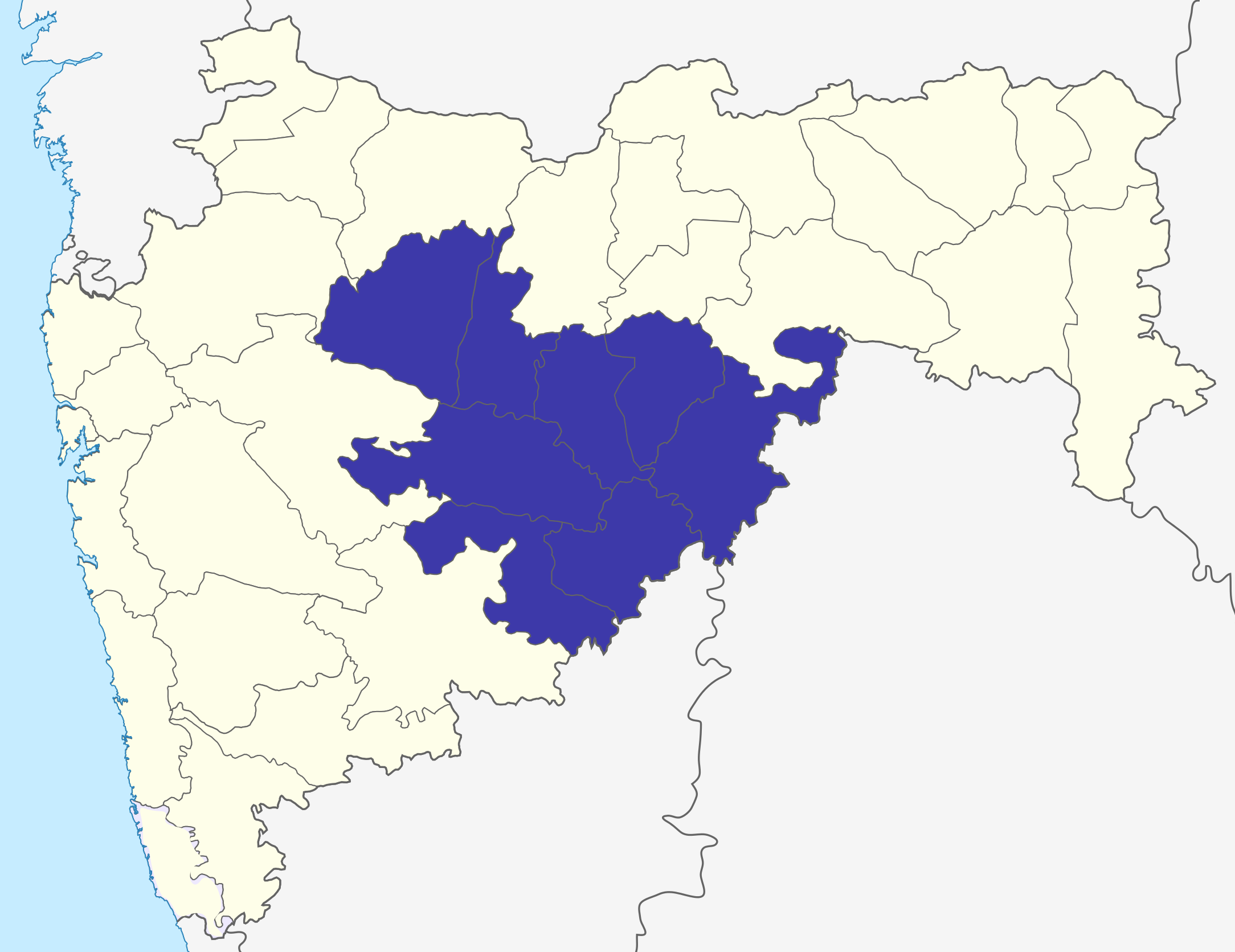
- Location of Marathwada in Maharashtra
- Country: India
- State: Maharashtra

Area
  - Total: 64,590 km^{2} (24,940 sq mi)

Population
  - Total: 18,731,872 (2,011)
  - Density: 354/km^{2} (920/sq mi)
- Districts: Aurangabad, Beed, Hingoli, Jalna, Latur, Nanded, Osmanabad, Parbhani
- Largest city: Aurangabad
- Division: Aurangabad division
- Literacy: 76.27%
- Sex ratio: 932

Marathwada (Marathi pronunciation: [məɾaːʈʰʋaːɖa]) is a geographical region of the Indian state of Maharashtra. It was formed during the Nizam's rule and was part of the then Hyderabad State. The region coincides with the Aurangabad division of Maharashtra. It borders the states of Karnataka and Telangana, and it lies to the west of the Vidarbha and east of Uttar Maharashtra regions of Maharashtra. The largest city of Marathwada is Aurangabad. Its people speak Marathi and Deccani Urdu (Hyderabadi Urdu).

Marathwada is known for its struggle for the integration into India, which is commemorated on 17 September as Marathwada Liberation Day.

== Etymology ==
The term Marathwada means the house of Marathi speaking people, that is land occupied by the Marathi-speaking population of the former Hyderabad state during the period of Nizam's rule. The term can be traced to 18th century state records of the Nizam of Hyderabad.

== Demographics ==
Marathwada has total area of 64590 km^{2} and had a population of 18,731,872 at the 2011 census of India. (Note: Marathwada is not separate political or administrative entity so there is no reference of population by name of "Marathwada", population has been calculated by adding population of 8 districts of Marathwada.)

=== Languages ===
Languages of Marathwada (2011)
1. Marathi (78.0%)
2. Urdu (9.56%)
3. Hindi (6.49%)
4. Lambadi (3.20%)
5. Others (2.77%)

At the time of the 2011 Census of India, the territory making up Marathwada had a variety of languages. 77.98% of the population spoke Marathi, 9.56% Urdu, 6.49% Hindi and 3.20% Lambadi as their first language.

=== Religion ===
Hinduism is the majority religion in Marathwada, with Islam and Buddhism being significant minorities. Sikhism has a significant presence in Nanded, meanwhile Jains are present in urban areas of Marathwada such as Aurangabad, Jalna and Osmanabad.

At the time of the 2011 Census of India, 76.67% of the population of Marathwada followed Hinduism, 15.12% Islam, 7.17% Buddhism, 0.22% Christianity and the remaining 0.82% of the population followed other religions or stated no religion. (Note: Marathwada is not separate political or administrative entity so there is no reference of population by name of "Marathwada", population for each religion has been calculated by adding population of 8 districts of Marathwada.)

Religion in Marathwada (2011)
1. Hinduism (76.7%)
2. Islam (15.1%)
3. Buddhism (7.17%)
4. Christianity (0.22%)
5. Other or not stated (0.82%)

== Under Nizam's rule ==
The region of Hingoli and Aurangabad were a major hub for the military stations and depot during the time of Nizam as well as during the British rule. Also Hyderabad State took special work to build Dams, modify and renovate the existing underwater system, particularly in Aurangabad. Major works were undertaken to build railways (Nizam's Guaranteed State Railway) connecting the city of Hyderabad to Bombay (now Mumbai) via Aurangabad. Handlooms and paper factories were established in Kaghzipura near Aurangabad. Religious sites were developed in Khuldabad.

Temporary guest houses were built for Sikh devotees in Nanded which lies in ruins due to neglect by the government authorities. Also roads connecting to Ahmedabad were initiated.

== Cities and districts ==
=== Major cities of Marathwada region ===
All the cities below have population of more than 100,000 with Aurangabad having 1.1 million inhabitants per the 2011 census.

- Aurangabad
- Nanded
- Latur
- Parbhani
- Udgir
- Jalna
- Beed
- Osmanabad

=== Districts ===
- Aurangabad, now Chhatrapati Sambhaji Nagar
- Beed
- Hingoli
- Jalna
- Latur
- Nanded
- Osmanabad, now Dharashiv
- Parbhani

In 2023, the Maharashtra government officially renamed Aurangabad district to Chhatrapati Sambhaji Nagar and Osmanabad district to Dharashiv.

There are Municipal Corporations at Nanded-Waghala Municipal Corporation, Latur Municipal Corporation, Parbhani Municipal Corporation and Jalna Municipal Corporation.

== Tourism ==
The state government recognises Aurangabad as the "Tourism Capital of Maharashtra". There are various tourist attractions in Aurangabad. Other places visited by tourists are:

- Ajanta Caves
- Ellora Caves
- Bibi Ka Maqbara
- Hazur Sahib Nanded
- Udgir Fort
- Ausa
- Dharashiv Caves
- Aundha Nagnath
- Mahur
- Kandhar
- Paithan
- Grishneshwar Temple
- Parli
- Tuljapur
- Yogeshwari, Mukundraj, Ambajogai
- Dharur, Beed
- Jamb Samarth, Jalna district
- Nanded Fort
- Sahasrakund Waterfall
Popular tourist spots in Marathwada

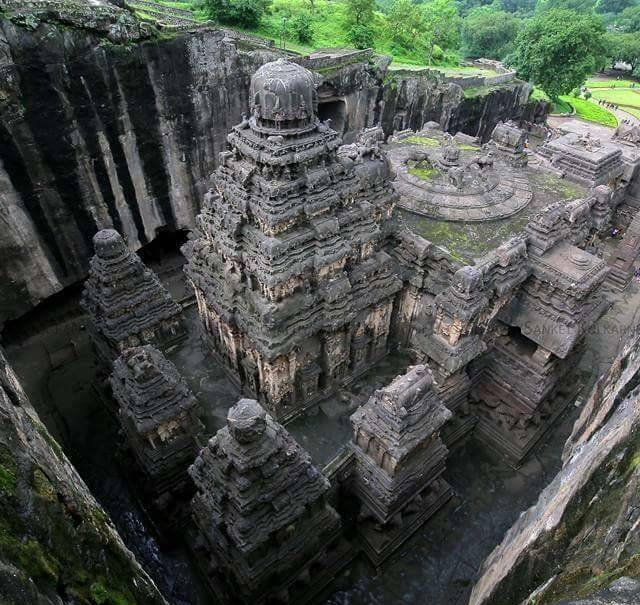
Kailasa Temple in Ellora Caves

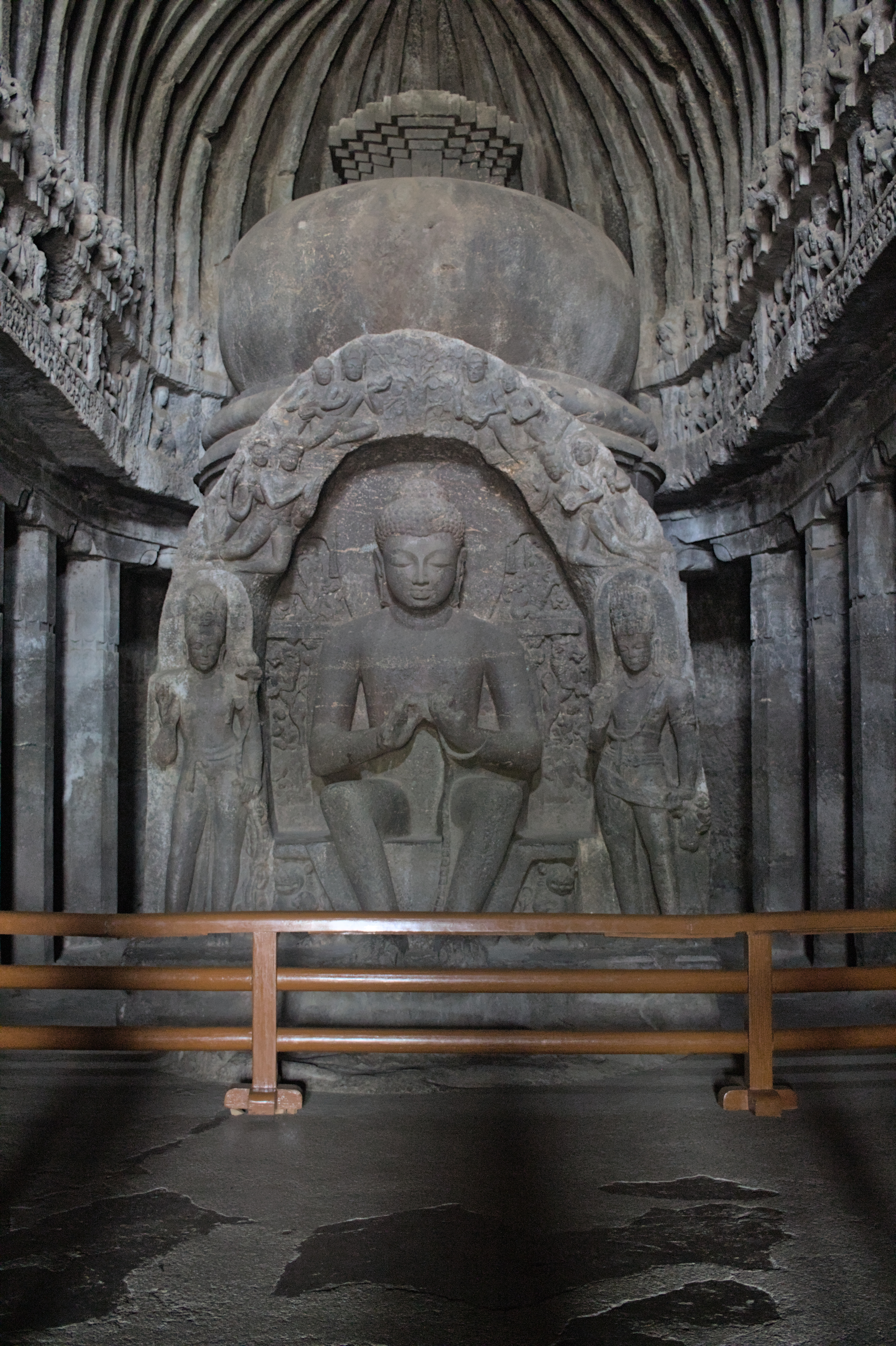
Chaitya Griha or prayer hall at Ajanta Caves in cave number 26

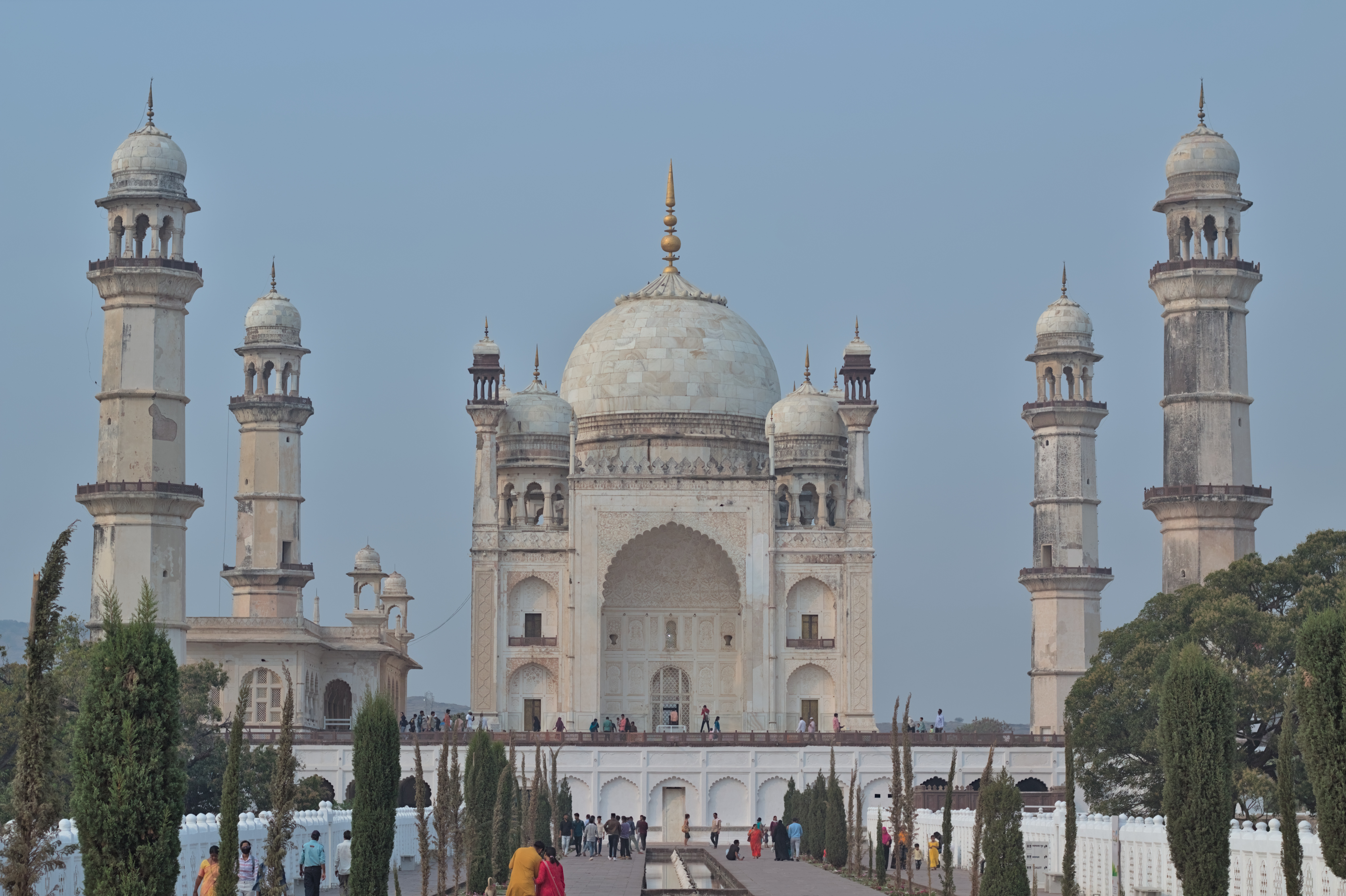
Bibi Ka Maqbara, also known as mini Taj Mahal

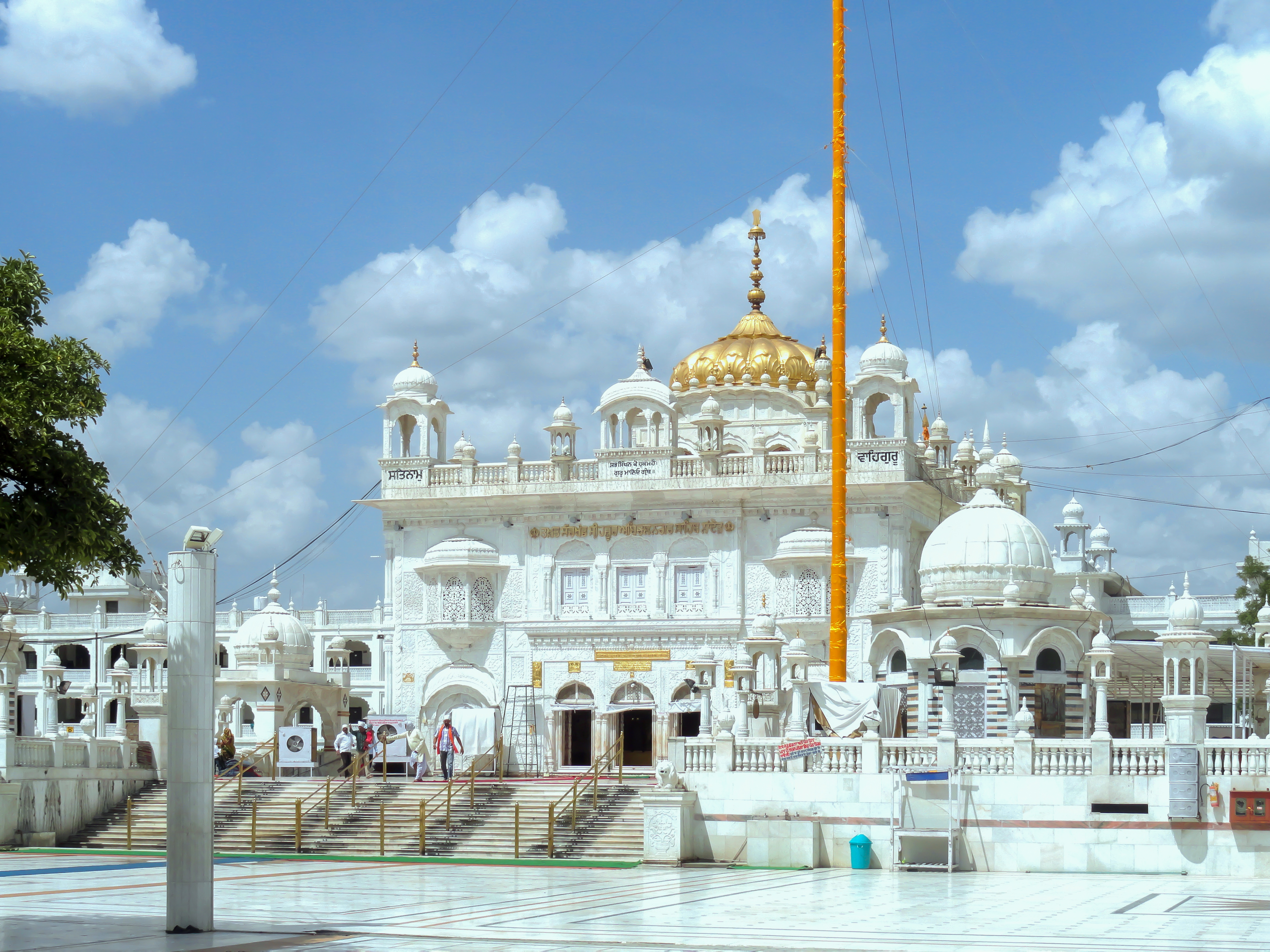
Hazur Sahib Nanded

== Education ==
Dr. Babasaheb Ambedkar Marathwada University, Aurangabad

Marathwada has Eight government medical colleges, situated at Chhatrapati Sambhajinagar, Latur, Nanded, Ambajogai, Parbhani, Dharashiv, Hingoli and Jalna. The region also has good government engineering colleges such as Government College of Engineering, Chhatrapati Sambhajinagar and Shri Guru Gobind Singhji Institute of Engineering and Technology, Nanded. Institute of Chemical Technology Mumbai Marathwada Campus Jalna (Nickname as ICT MARJhttps://marj.ictmumbai.edu.in/ ).ICT Marathwada Campus Jalna is premier institute for the Chemical Engineering and Technology and allied Sciences.It also has three major universities, being Dr. Babasaheb Ambedkar Marathwada University at Chhatrapati Sambhajinagar, Vasantrao Naik Marathwada Agricultural University at Parbhani, and Swami Ramanand Teerth Marathwada University at Nanded.

The foundation of agricultural research in Marathwada region of Hyderabad state was laid by the 7th Nizam of Hyderabad Mir Osman Ali Khan with the commencement of the Main Experimental Farm in 1918 in Parbhani. During the Nizam's rule agricultural education was available only at Hyderabad; crop research centers for sorghum, cotton and fruits existed in Parbhani. After independence, this facility was developed further by the Indian government which was renamed as Marathwada Agriculture University on 18 May 1972. The Institute of Chemical Technology, Mumbai (formerly known as UDCT) has a satellite campus located in Jalna which was established in 2018.

== Droughts and suicide of farmers ==
Marathwada is affected by frequent anomalies in rainfall during Monsoon season, which accounts for almost 80 per cent of the annual rainfall. The average annual rainfall over the division is 882 mm. Almost three-fourths of the Marathwada division is covered by farmlands. Hence, drought continues to have a considerable impact on the life of farmers.

In some Marathwada districts recurring droughts have forced people to drink fluoride-contaminated groundwater from borewells which has inflicted debilitating fluorosis on many.

The region also sees high instances of farmer suicides. According to government records, 422 farmers in Marathwada committed suicide in 2014. This was because of their inability to bear crop losses and a financial quandary made acute by water scarcity and an agrarian crisis. 2014 was the third consecutive year of low rainfall, and when rainfall did occur it was sometimes untimely and damaged crops. Of the 422 suicides, 252 cases were due to an inability to repay agricultural loans. There have been more than 117 farmer suicides in the first two months of 2017. According to a study by IIT Bombay, the severe or extreme droughts have frequently occurred in major portions of Marathwada, in the last few decades.

== See also ==
- List of people from Marathwada
- Hyderabad State
- Nizam's Guaranteed State Railway
- Make in Maharashtra
- Manav Vikas Mission
- Dalit Kitchens of Marathwada
