= Bhartiya Shikshan Prasarak Sanstha, Ambajogai =

Indian educational organisation

- भारतीय शिक्षण प्रसारक संस्था, अंबाजोगाई
- Motto: केल्याने होत आहे रे । आधी केलेची पाहिजे ।। (transl. It is happening by doing, it should be done first)
- Abbreviation: BSPS
- Formation: June 28, 1952; 74 years ago
- Type: Non-governmental educational organization
- Headquarters: Ambajogai, Beed district, Maharashtra, India
- Region served: Marathwada
- Official language: Marathi; English
- Key people: Surendra Alurkar (president); Nitin Manikchandji Kotecha (vice president); Vinayak Bhujangrao Kulkarni (treasurer)

The Bhartiya Shikshan Prasarak Sanstha (abbr. BSPS) translated as "Indian Education Disseminator Organisation" is an Indian educational organization based in Ambajogai, Maharashtra. There are 58 schools and colleges under the "Bharatiya Shikshan Prasarak Sanstha" in different districts of Maharashtra.

== History ==
During the 1940s and 1950s, Ambajogai was heavily influenced by communist ideology. There was a school of socialist thought started by Swami Ramanand Tirtha. At that time, a program was decided by Yadavrao Joshi to increase teamwork. On June 28, 1951, the organization workers got together and started a class in a two-room space. At that time, a teacher from Yogeshwari Vidyalaya had come to Joshi's program. Dattopant Vaidya was a teacher at Yogeshwari Vidyalaya at the time; he used to run this school. He was told to stop joining the team. Vaidya Guruji immediately resigned from his job and joined the efforts of Kholeshwar School. Rajabhau Chousalkar, Kisanrao Kodarkar, Tulshiram Dhaygude, and Dattopant Vaidya were the founding members of the organization in the early period. The classes were started in a room in the palace of Karhade. At that time, there were only 10 students. As the number of students gradually increased, secondary schools were started in 1956. The organization at that time had no recognition, grants, and budget.

Sureshrao Ketkar and Moropant Pingle, the campaigners of the organization in Solapur, are looking into the work of the organization. In 1966, along with Kholeshwar Vidyalaya of Ambajogai, two more schools were started at Majalgaon, Udgir. The government then did not allow new schools. So the institution decided to open the colleges. The first college was started in 1972, and in 1975, there was an emergency; in 2006–07, professors of the college were imprisoned. Apart from that, an administrator was appointed to the college. Today, the Bhartiya Shikshan Prasarak Sanstha has 58 schools and colleges. These schools are called "Sanskar Kendra," and the principals are called "Sanskar Kendra Pramukh" instead of schools and principles. The faith is that "these are not just schools but institutions for inculcating national thought, patriotism, and culture." Many innovative activities started by the organization have been implemented by the state government later, such as the subjects of leadership development and paripath (transl. Routine), which were taught in the institute long ago in the years 1972–73.

1978–79 was actually the silver jubilee year of the institute. But it was not celebrated that year, as many senior activists were in jail. After the emergency, the Silver Jubilee was celebrated, attended by former prime minister of India Atal Bihari Vajpayee. At the conclusion of the silver festival, guidance was given by Sarsangchalak Madhukar Dattatraya Deoras. Semi-English, CBSC schools were opened in developing areas. The Vidya Bharati curriculum is also implemented for children in adolescence. Training camps were also held here with the help of Mama Kshirsagar, Damu Anna, and Kukde Kaka. Sports are also given special attention, as physical fitness is important along with the intellectual knowledge of the students. Kho-Kho, Kabaddi, volleyball, Mallakhamb, Dand, Talwarbaji, and Jorbaithka teams participated at the state level every year. Computer courses, library, science exhibition, ghosh, recitation competition, as well as special evening classes for 10th graders, are conducted. On the golden anniversary of the organization, Sarsanghchalak K. S. Sudarshan and Narendra Modi were present.

== Institutions ==
Source: Shikshan Vivek

| Name | Location | |
| Name | City/Town | District |
|---|---|---|
| Arya Chanakya Madhyamika Vidyalaya | Paithan | Sambhajinagar |
| Arya Chanakya Prathamik Vidyalaya | Paithan | Sambhajinagar |
| Shree Chinteswar Primary School | Gevrai | Beed |
| Kai. Dattaji Bhale Vidyalaya | Ambad | Jalna |
| Shree Kholeshwar Prathamik Vidyalaya | Ambajogai | Beed |
| Shree Kholeshwar Madhyamik Vidyalaya | Ambajogai | Beed |
| Shree Kholeshwar Kanishta Va Kiman Kaushalya Mahavidyalaya | Ambajogai | Beed |
| Kai. Nana Palkar Prathamik Vidyalaya | Nanded | Nanded |
| Shree Param Pujya Golwalkar Guruji Prathamik Vidyalaya | Deglur | Nanded |
| Shree Param Pujya Golwalkar Guruji Madhyamik Vidyalaya | Deglur | Nanded |
| Sanchareshwar Prathamik Vidyalaya | Jintur | Parbhani |
| Shri. Keshavraj Vidyalaya | Latur | Latur |
| Shree Siddheshwar Prathamik Vidyalaya | Majalgaon | Beed |
| Shree Siddheshwar Madhyamik Vidyalaya | Majalgaon | Beed |
| Shree Siddheshwar Kanishta Mahavidyalaya | Majalgaon | Beed |
| Shree Siddheshwar Varishta Mahavidyalaya | Majalgaon | Beed |
| Shree Lalbahadur Shastri Prathamik Vidyalaya | Udgir | Latur |
| Shree Lalbahadur Shastri Madhyamik Vidyalaya | Udgir | Latur |
| Shree Lalbahadur Shastri College | Udgir | Latur |
| Shree Keshav Primary School | Dharmabad | Nanded |
| Shri. Vivekananda Primary School | Selu | Parbhani |
| Swa. Savarkar Vidyalaya | Beed | Beed |
| Vikramaditya Primary School | Sambhajinagar | Sambhajinagar |
