= Ambajogai =

- City
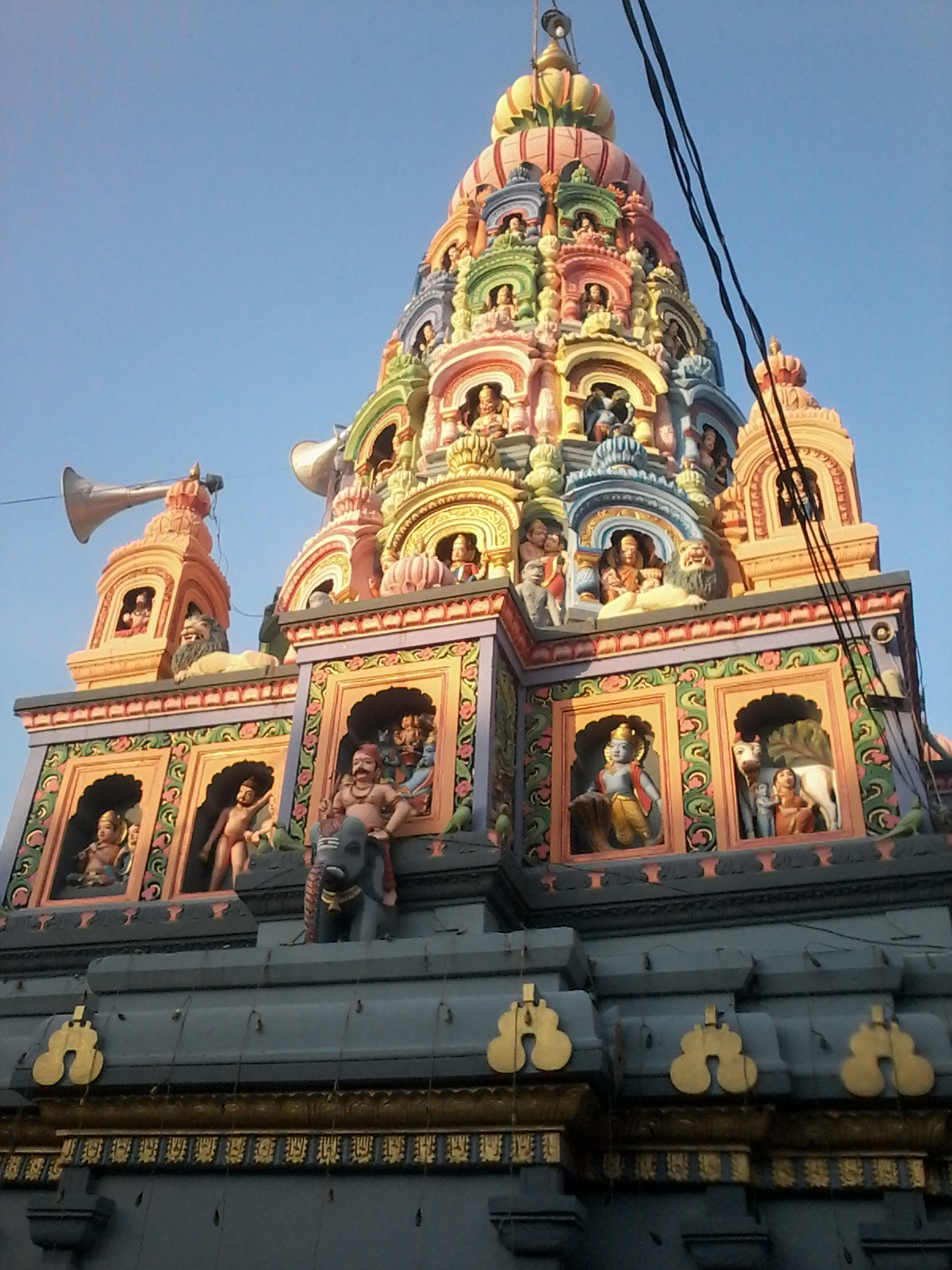
- Yogeshwari (Amba) Temple Top at Ambajogai
- Nickname: Ambanagari
- Interactive map of Ambajogai
- Coordinates: 18.73°N 76.38°E
- Country: India
- State: Maharashtra
- District: Beed
- Named for: Ambabai

Government
  - Type: Municipal Council

Population (2011)
  - Total: 74,844
- Demonym: Ambajogaikar
- Time zone: UTC+5:30 (IST)
- PIN Code: 431517
- Telephone code: 02446
- Vehicle registration: MH-44
- Lok Sabha constituency: Beed
- Vidhan Sabha constituency: Kaij
- Official language: Marathi

Ambajogai is a city and tehsil in Beed district of Maharashtra State in India. Regarded as the cultural capital of Marathwada, the town features attractions like the Shivleni Caves and monuments honoring Marathi poet Mukundraj, the author of "Viveksindu," the first Marathi literary work, as well as Dasopant.

Ambajogai, often referred as the "City Of The Temple" holds a significant place in history, second only to Kashi in terms of its cultural and spiritual heritage. The city boasts over a hundred temples, many of which have withstood the challenges like dismantlement by the Nizams of Hyderabad and damage from the Killari earthquake. Despite these setbacks, Ambajogai remains a testament to its historical legacy. Visitors can marvel at ancient "baravs" (step wells) and serene lakes, while the revered temple of Shri Yogeshwari Mata features an exceptional Vinayaki idol in its shikhara, showcasing the city's enduring artistry and devotion.

The town was renamed Nizami name Mominabad to Ambajogai after goddess Yogeshwari (also known as Jogai) whose heritage temple is located here and are visited by people all over from Maharashtra, largely from the Konkan region. The town has many heritage places and this township is known as the cultural capital of the Marathwada region. The town has other heritage Hindu temples such as Sakleshwar, 12 Khambhi Mandir (lit. '12 pillar temple'), Kholeshwar Mandir, Mukundraj Smadhi and Dasopant Swami Samadhi, Kashivishwanath, Amruteshwar. There is an ancient cave called Shivleni Caves (Hattikhana) also known as Jogai Mandap declared as the Protected Monuments in Maharashtra (Archaeological sites in Maharashtra), where Lord Shankar, Nandi and Elephants are carved in stone, Bramha and Vishnu are also carved.

According to popular belief, Ambajogai is celebrated as the birthplace of the Marathi language but no empirical evidence supports this claim. This belief is prominent because the first literary work in Marathi, Vivekasindhu by Mukundraj, was written here. The revered Yogeshvari Devi temple, a site of deep spiritual significance, is the ancestral deity of many families across Maharashtra, drawing numerous pilgrims to the city.

A lesser known landmark here is the Shah Buruj, a historical watchtower standing in front of Kholeshwar Temple. Built in the 13th century by Raja Singhan of Devgiri, this circular tower, approximately 35 feet tall, was used for surveillance. A staircase inside leads up, though time has worn down the base, making it unsafe to climb today.

The Shah Buruj seen its share of historical intrigue. During the Nizam's rule, it housed a radio transmitter. When the Marathas discovered it was broadcasting news for the Nizam, they attempted to seize it. Although they weren't successful, the transmitter was permanently shut down, marking yet another chapter in the Buruj's storied past.

== History ==
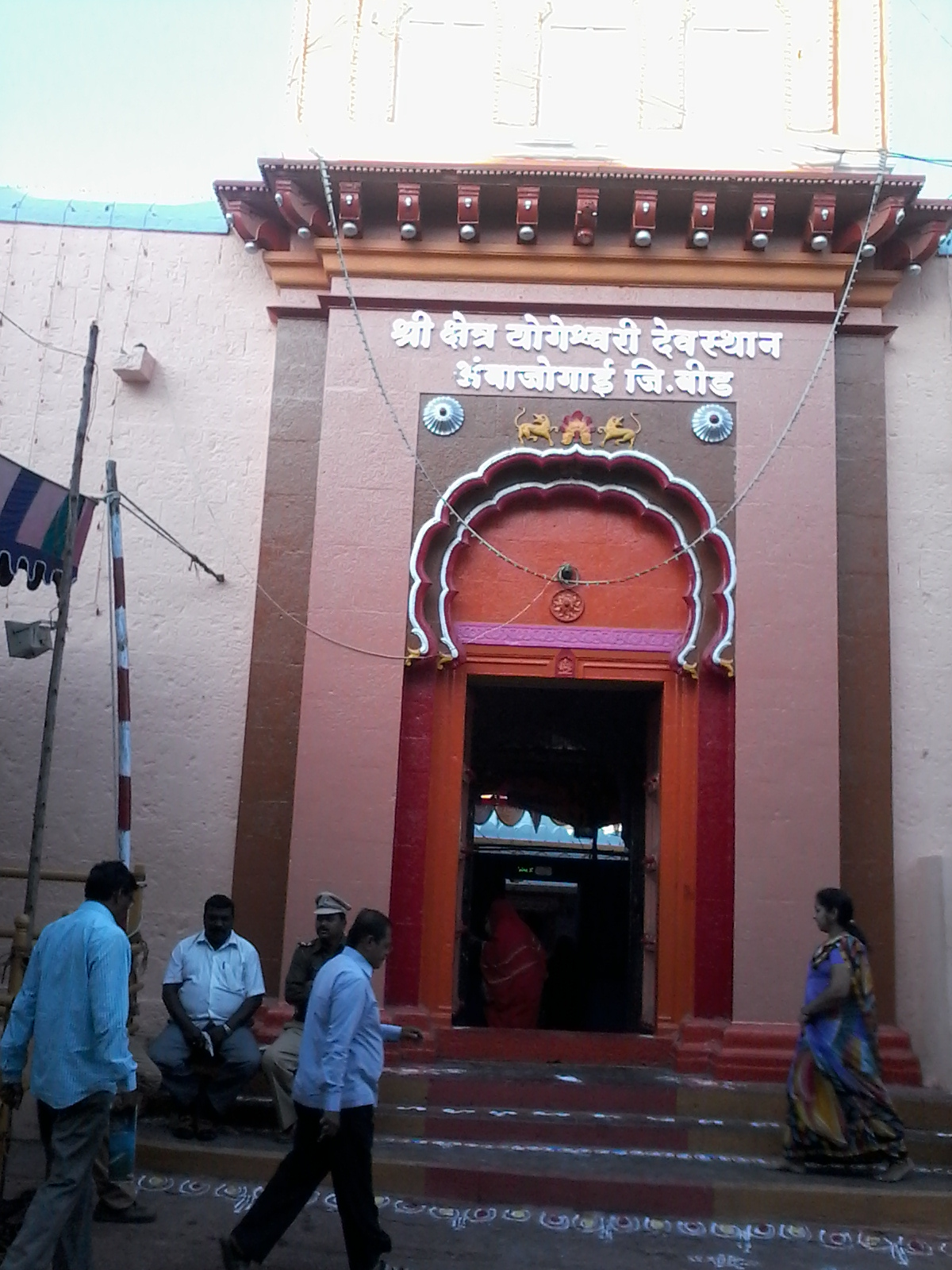
Entrance of Yogeshwari(Amba) Temple at Ambajogai

The town has been a cultural center in the region from the ancient times. The Yogeshwari temple, Kholeshwar temple and Barakhambi temple hints the cultural prosperity of the town dating back to 10th century CE. It was formerly known as Amrapur, Jayantipur, Jogaiambe.

Ambajogai named by The Amba – (Goddess Parvati / Durga) by his birthplace (jogai), who appeared at this place to finish Dantasura (a devil). It was also known as Jaywantinagar by name of King (Raja) Jaywant and river's name Jayawanti, turned to Mominabad under the regime of Nizam of Hyderabad before the annexation of Hyderabad state to the dominion of India. Many heritage sites and temples were harmed during this period. It was a military base of the Hyderabad state army. The stable of the horses of the cavalry of the Hyderabad army was later turned into a hospital and medical college which later was named as Swami Ramanand Teerth Rural Medical College.

== Temples and sacred sites of Ambajogai ==
1. Shri Yogeshwari Devi Temple
2. Adyakavi Mukundaraj Swami Temple
3. Shri Bada Hanuman Temple
4. Sarvagna Dasopant Temple
5. Shri Renukai Devi Temple (Lahan Jogai)
6. Shri Khoparnath Temple
7. Thorale and Dhakate Devghar (Temple)
8. Shri. Ram Temple
9. Butteenath (The God of Herbal Remedies)
10. Shri Kshirsagareshwar Temple
11. Shri Balaji Temple
12. Shri Kedareshwar Temple (Lord Mahadev Temple)
13. Shri Bhucharnath Temple (Shivleni Caves Hattikhana Caves, Elephanta Caves, Bhu-char-nath,)
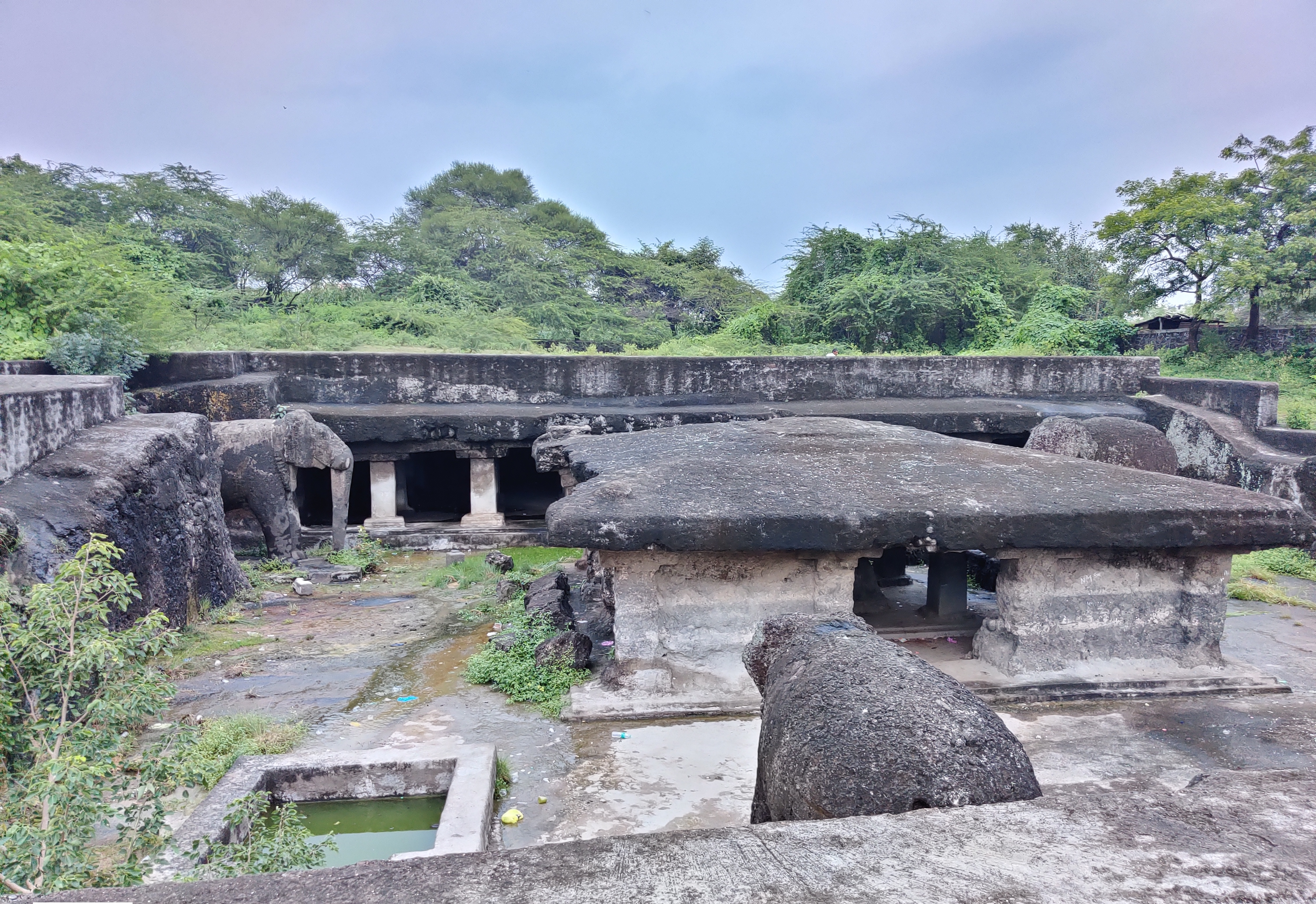
  Bhucharnath Cave
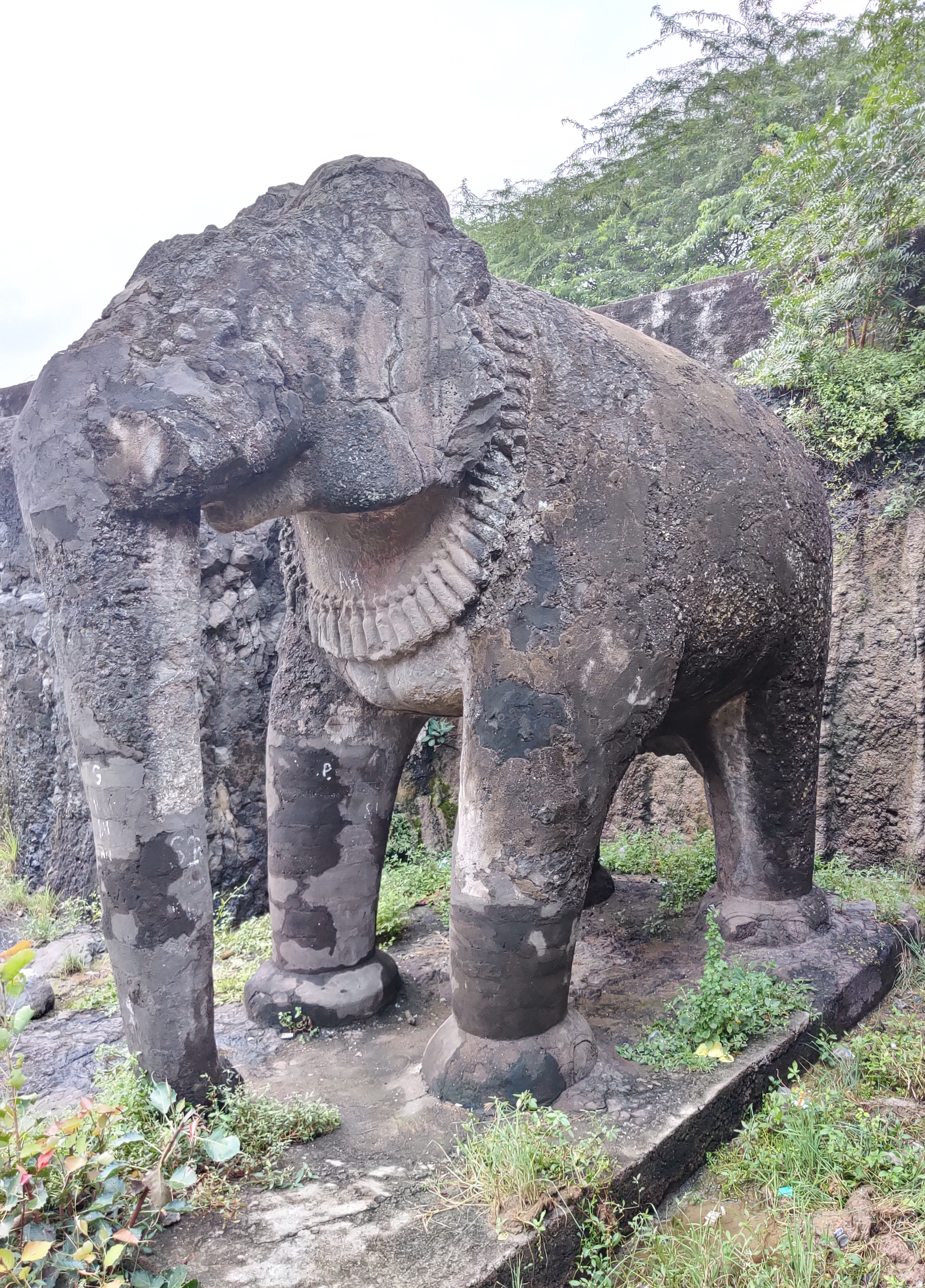
  Bhucharinath Cave
  Historical and Archaeological Significance Ambajogai, a city of ancient origins, Among the noteworthy archaeological remains are two elephant caves, located approximately 1 to 1.5 kilometers northwest of the Yogeshwari Temple along the banks of the Jayawanti River. These caves are carved into the riverbanks on both sides: a larger cave on the right bank and a smaller one on the left. The larger cave is associated with a local legend connecting it to the marriage of Goddess Yogeshwari and Lord Vaidyanath. It is currently under the care and maintenance of the Archaeological Department and remains in relatively good condition. The smaller cave contains Jain rock-cut sculptures, including depictions of Nagas, Mahavir Parshvanath, Rishabhanatha, their Yakshis, attendants, and a panel featuring the 24 Tirthankaras. Additionally, remnants of Shaivism sculptures in a dilapidated state have been found in the vicinity. The cave also includes narrow chambers and small monk cells, indicative of its use by Jain ascetics. now one small area is a major sewage drain from various parts of the city now empties near the entrance of the larger elephant cave. The smaller elephant cave, once a significant site of historical and cultural value, is on the verge of extinction due to years of neglect and encroachment.
14. Shri Shambhuling Shivacharya Math
15. Shri Kholewar Temple
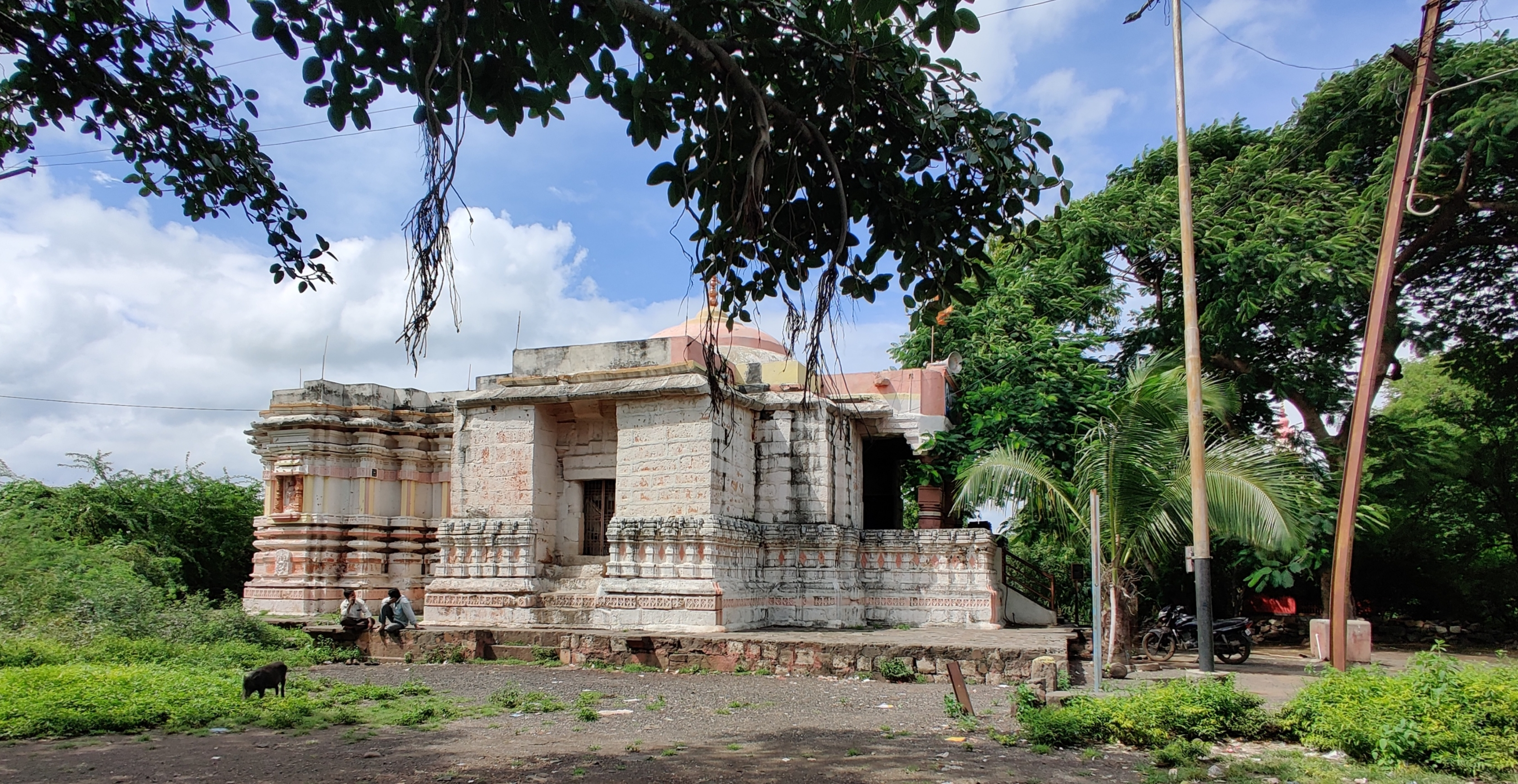
  Kholeshwar Temple
  Kholeshwar Temple, one of the prominent historical and religious landmarks in Ambajogai, is a 13th-century Hemadpanthi Hindu temple. According to an inscription within the temple, it was constructed in 1162 Shaka (1240 CE) by Lakshmi, the daughter of Kholeshwar, in memory of her younger brother Ram, who was killed in a battle. Situated south of Ambajogai near the fort of King Jaitrapala AKA Jaitugi, the temple is east-facing and stands as a fine example of Yadava-era architecture. The temple features a grand stone platform and an intricately carved stone mandapa supported by four stone pillars. An inscription on the left side of the entrance provides historical details, affirming the temple's origins. The name "Kholeshwar" is believed to have originated from local lore about the influence of the deity Kholeshwar on the region, which eventually overshadowed its original identity as a Shiva temple. During the Nizam era, the temple's hall was repurposed as a courtroom, later relocated. Built on a solid stone foundation, the temple also features a large bastion to its right, known as Jaitrapal's Fort, later renamed Shah Buruj during the Nizam period. This bastion holds historical significance, with several events from the Hyderabad Liberation Struggle associated with it. The Kholeshwar Temple and its surroundings remain a testament to the region's rich history and architectural heritage.
16. Shri Siddheshwar Mahadev Temple and Papnashi Tirth
17. Shri Sakleshwar Mahadev Temple (Barakhambi Temple)
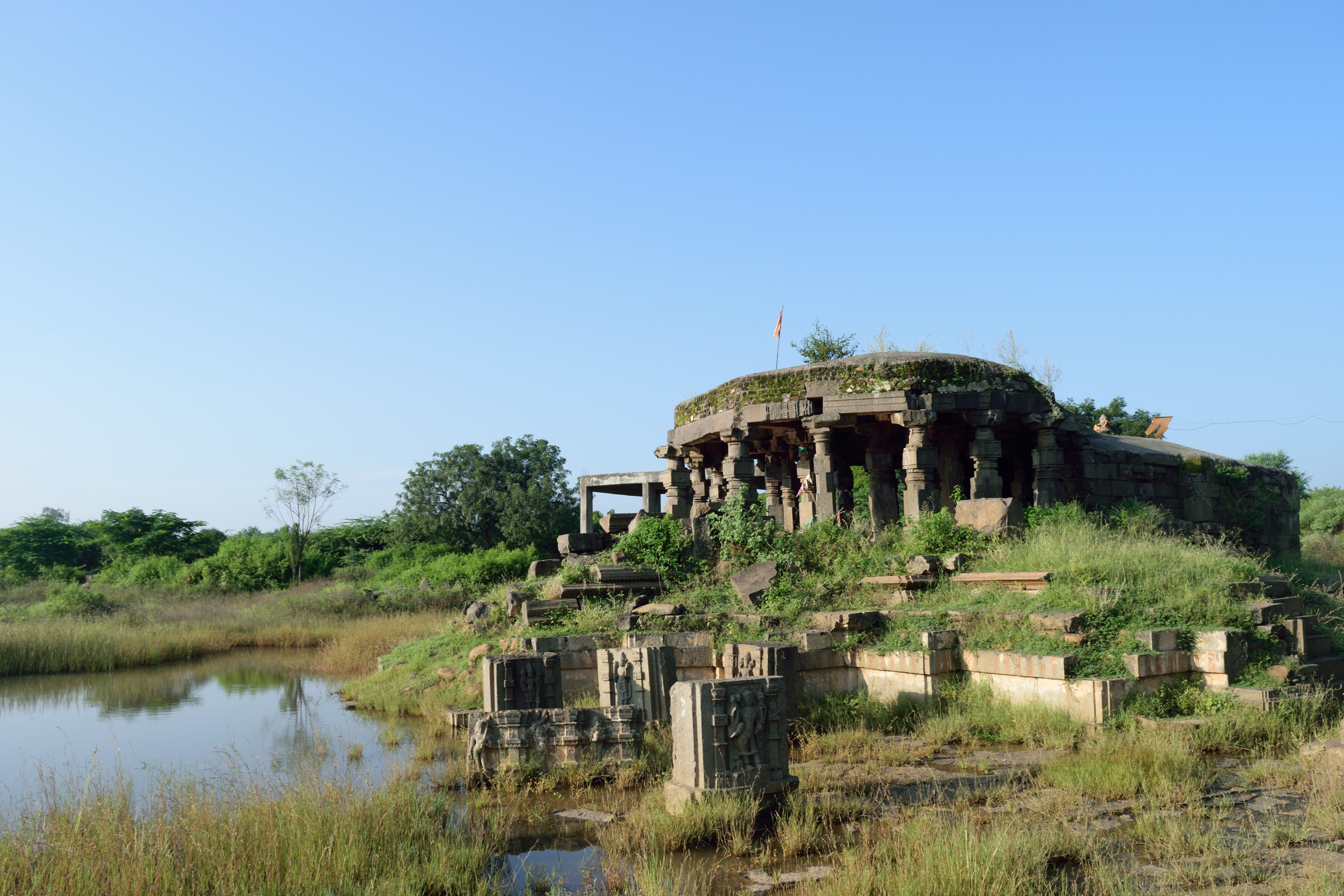
  Barakhambi Temple
  Chalukya-Era Sankleshwar Temple The Sankleshwar Temple is near Ambajogai, a fine example of 11th-century Chalukyan architecture, recently garnered attention during a cleanliness drive in the area. While clearing the vicinity, a group of local volunteers uncovered approximately 60 to 70 idols buried underground, including partially damaged and intact sculptures, alongside remnants of temple structures and a stepwell. These discoveries, reported with visuals in newspapers and television, prompted a visit from an Archaeological Department team led by Assistant Director Ajit Khandare on Republic Day. The team expressed strong disapproval of the excavation activities conducted without proper permissions, as they caused significant damage to the artifacts and the temple. According to the department, excavations of such sites require authorization under the Indian Treasure Trove Act, 1878 and the Bombay Treasure Trove Rules of 1958. During their inspection, the Archaeological Department observed extensive unauthorized digging up to 12 feet deep, carried out using heavy machinery like JCBs. This resulted in the exposure of the temple's foundational elements, particularly on the left side of the sanctum, making the structure unstable and hazardous. The team speculated that the site could originally have been part of an area of three interconnected temples. Plans were announced to conduct systematic archaeological excavations and conservation efforts to restore the temple to its original form. Citizens were urged to protect this invaluable heritage and refrain from any further unauthorized activities in the area to prevent additional damage.
18. Shri Amaleshwar Mahadev Temple
19. Nagzhari Kund and Mahadev Temple
20. Shri Kashivishwanath Temple
21. Shri Digambar Jain Temple
22. Shri Chaubhara Ganapati Temple
23. Dharoba Temple

Ambajogai's people believed to have once been home to 24 Shiva temples and nearly 50 other temples, though many of these are now lost to history, remembered only through stories from the town's elders. This list highlights the remaining temples and sacred sites in Ambajogai, showcasing its rich spiritual heritage and cultural significance.

== Jaywanti River ==
The city is the cultural capital of Marathwada. Known in ancient times as Ambanagari and later as Jayavantinagar during King Jayavanta's rule, it was renamed Mominabad under the Nizam’s reign. This city, nestled along the banks of the Jayanti River in Beed district, is wellconnected to many other districts in Maharashtra, making it easily accessible.

- Latitude: 18.75147° or 18° 45' 5" north
- Longitude: 76.36763° or 76° 22' 4" east
- Elevation: 541 metres (1,775 feet)
- Open Location Code: 7JCRQ929+H3
- GeoNames ID: 10436029

== Villages in Ambajogai Taluka ==
Villages in Ambajogai Taluka
Letter	Villages
A	Akola; Ambajogai; Ambaltek; Ambalwadi; Anjanpur; Apegaon
B	Babhalgaon; Bagzari; Bardapur; Bharaj; Bhatanwadi; Bhawthana
C	Chanai; Chandanwadi; Chichkhandi; Chopanwadi; Chothewadi
D	Dagadwadi; Daithana Radi; Daradwadi; Dattapur; Devla; Dhanora; Dighol Amba; Dongar Pimpla
G	Ghatnandur; Gholapwadi; Girwli; Gitta
H	Hanumanwadi; Hatola; Hiwara
J	Jawalgaon; Jodwadi; Jogaiwadi
K	Katkarwadi; Kendrewadi; Khapartone; Kodari; Kolkanadi; Kopra; Krushnanagar; Kumbephal; Kuranwadi; Kusalwadi
L	Laman Tanda; Limbgaon; Lokhandi Sawargaon
M	Magarwadi; Makegaon; Malewadi; Mamdapur; Mandva; Morewadi; Mudegaon; Multan Tanda; Murambi; Murkutwadi; Murti
N	Nandadi; Nandgaon; Nawabwadi; Nirpana
P	Patoda; Pattiwadgaon; Pimpala Dhaiguda; Pimpri; Pokhari; Pus
R	Radi; Radi Tanda; Rajewadi; Rakshaswadi
S	Sakud; Salunkwadi; Sangaon; Satephal; Saundana; Saygaon; Selu Amba; Shepwadi; Shripatraiwadi; Somanwadi; Somnath Borgaon; Sonwala; Sugaon
T	Tadola; Talegaon Ghat; Talni; Tatborgaon; Telghana
U	Ujani; Umrai
W	Waghala; Waghalwadi; Wakdi; Walewadi; Warapgaon; Warwati
Y	Yelda

== Literature ==
Ambajogai is regarded as one of the significant centres of early Marathi literature, owing largely to its association with medieval saint-poets such as Mukundraj and Dasopant. These figures shaped the philosophical and literary landscape of the Deccan, and their works are considered foundational texts in Marathi spiritual literature.

Mukundraj, often described as the earliest known Marathi poet, is traditionally believed to have composed the Viveksindhu and Paramamrit, two seminal works rooted in Advaita Vedanta philosophy. Local traditions associate him with the caves near Ambajogai, from where he is said to have written and taught, contributing to the development of early Marathi prose and didactic verse.

Dasopant (or Dasopant of Narayanpur), another influential saint-poet linked to the region, is known for his extensive literary output, which includes commentaries, bhakti compositions, and philosophical treatises. His writings reflect a synthesis of Varkari devotion, Nath influences, and scholastic interpretation, making him one of the most prolific writers of his time. Several manuscripts and oral traditions in Ambajogai and neighbouring villages preserve memories of his work and travels.

Beyond its saint-poet heritage, Ambajogai nurtured a vibrant literary culture through institutions such as the Saraswati Dhanwantri Granthalaya (est. 1854), one of Maharashtra’s oldest public libraries. It became an important hub for reading, manuscript preservation, and literary discussion, influencing generations of writers, scholars, and socially engaged thinkers in Marathwada.

The region’s strong connection with Varkari, Bhakti, and folk traditions, including kirtan, powada, and bhajan, continues to inform local literary activity. Regular kavi sammelans, cultural festivals, and scholarly gatherings sustain Ambajogai’s position as a historical and contemporary centre of Marathi literary expression.

== Ambajogai Sahitya Sammelan ==
Ambajogai hosts the literary meeting Ambajogai Sahitya Sammelan, which was initiated by figures like Sudarshan Rapatwar and Amar Habib.

== Demographics ==
As of 2011 India census, Ambajogai had a population of 74,844. Males constitute 52% of the population and females 48%. Ambajogai has an average literacy rate of 85.89%, higher than the national average of 74.04%; with 91.58% of the males and 79.88% of females literate. 12% of the population is under 6 years of age. Saraswati public school is residential school since last 22 years.

== Education ==
Ambajogai has been referred as the "Shikshanache Maherghar" (meaning: Motherland of Education). Since pre independence era, the council has been home to educational institutions motivated by particular objectives. The educational organisations such as Shree Yogeshwari Shikshan Sanstha and Bhartiya Shikshan Prasarak Sanstha was established before the formation Maharashtra. Ambajogai's Yogeshwari Mahavidyalaya was founded in 1935. There are 14 higher secondary colleges in Ambajogai town and division, including medical college Swami Ramanand Teerth Rural Medical College.

== See also ==
- Shah Buruj
- Swami Ramanand Teerth Rural Medical College and Hospital

== Notable people ==
- Swami Ramanand Tirtha
- Shankar Bapu Apegaonkar
- Pramod Mahajan
- Dwarkadas Lohiya
- Shaila Lohiya
- Rangnath Tiwari
- Vimal Mundada
- Namita Mundada
- Amar Habib
