= Dasopant =

Dasopant (1551–1615) belonged to the Datta sect. He was born in a Deshastha Brahmin family in the village of Narayan Peth. He was the son of Digambarpant, an official of Bidar's Barid Shahi kingdom, responsible for collecting land revenue and handing it over to the rulers.

Dasopant wrote mainly in Marathi, was a Sanskrit scholar in which are some of his commentaries. He also composed songs in Kannada, Telugu and Hindi. He is said to have written over 500,000 (5 lakh) couplets, only some of which have been published. He wrote two commentaries on the Gita called Gitarnava and Gitarthabodhachandrika (Gitartha Chandrika), which is a smaller commentary as compared to his previous book in which he follows the Advaita Siddhanta school of thought. Another book authored by him was the Grantharaja, which is considered a precursor of Dasbodh. However, since most of his works lack significant literary qualities, only a small part of them have been published.

== Dasopant and Dasodigambar ==
Dasopant was born on a Monday in the year 1473 of the Shaka era (ancient Hindu calendar), on the eighth day of the Bhadrapada month, in the Narayanpeth village of Bidar region. His father, Digambar Pant Deshpande, and mother, Parvati Bai, were blessed with immense wealth and prosperity, and their home was considered a dwelling place of the goddess of wealth, Lakshmi.

By the age of sixteen, Dasopant had already renounced household life and began a period of penance that spanned twelve to thirteen years. At some time between the ages of 35 and 40, he arrived in Ambajogai. There, he committed himself to social welfare and the spread of Hinduism through his writings.

Dasopant's legacy endures through his many writings. His well-known works include Geetarnava, Geetarthachandrika, Prabodhoday, Padarnav, Grantharaj, Upanishad Bhashya (in Sanskrit), and Pasodi Panchikaran. Except for Upanishad Bhashya, all other compositions are in the Marathi language, comprising nearly 150,000 verses. His poetry and prose contributed greatly to the spread of Hindu teachings and values.

During the 16th century, when forced religious conversions to Islam were rampant, Dasopant, along with saints Janardan and Eknath, resisted these efforts and worked extensively to protect Hindu culture. At one point, when Dasopant's monastery in Ambajogai faced threats from the Muslim regime, Chhatrapati Sambhaji Raje sent his army to protect Dasopant and his establishment. Historical records mention rare occasions when Dasopant met Chhatrapati Shivaji Maharaj, who even gifted Dasopant a letter written in his own hand.

To this day, the shrine of Dasopant in Ambajogai remains a revered site, where devotees gather daily for worship. His direct disciples preserved his teachings, and one such disciple, Dr. Bapu Saheb Deshpande, played a crucial role in keeping the tradition alive. Today, Dr. Deshpande's family continues to honor Dasopant's legacy by caring for his shrine, hosting an annual celebration in his memory, and upholding the practices he established.

== Dasopant and the One-Faced Dattatreya ==
A captivating tale related to Dasopant and a unique Dattatreya idol is passed down through tradition. Towards the end of his life, sensing his time was near, Dasopant gathered his devotees and shared the news with them. The devotees, disheartened by the thought of losing him, pleaded for a keepsake that would remind them of his presence. Dasopant, honoring their request, instructed them to bring clay from the riverbank and personally crafted a beautiful idol of Lord Dattatreya. He carefully buried the idol in a vessel of grain, telling his followers, "In one month, this idol will turn to brass, in two months to panchadhatu (an alloy of five metals), in three months to silver, in four months to gold, and in five months to a gem-studded masterpiece. Trust this process, and only retrieve the idol after five months."

Shortly after this, Dasopant passed away. Some weeks later, a restless devotee, unable to resist his curiosity, secretly unearthed the idol after only two months and found it had indeed transformed to panchadhatu. Astonished, he reburied the idol without telling anyone. Five months later, when all the devotees gathered to ceremonially unveil the idol, they found it still made of panchadhatu. The truth of the impatient devotee's actions eventually surfaced, but the idol remains revered for its extraordinary beauty and craftsmanship, with Dasopant's blessings said to linger upon it.

Dasopant's legacy in Maharashtra remains strong, with Ambajogai holding a sacred place in the hearts of the devotees. Here, he taught the wisdom of Vedic knowledge in a language that everyone could understand, making complex teachings accessible to the masses.
