= Shivleni Caves =

Rock-cut cave monuments in India

- Jogai Mandap
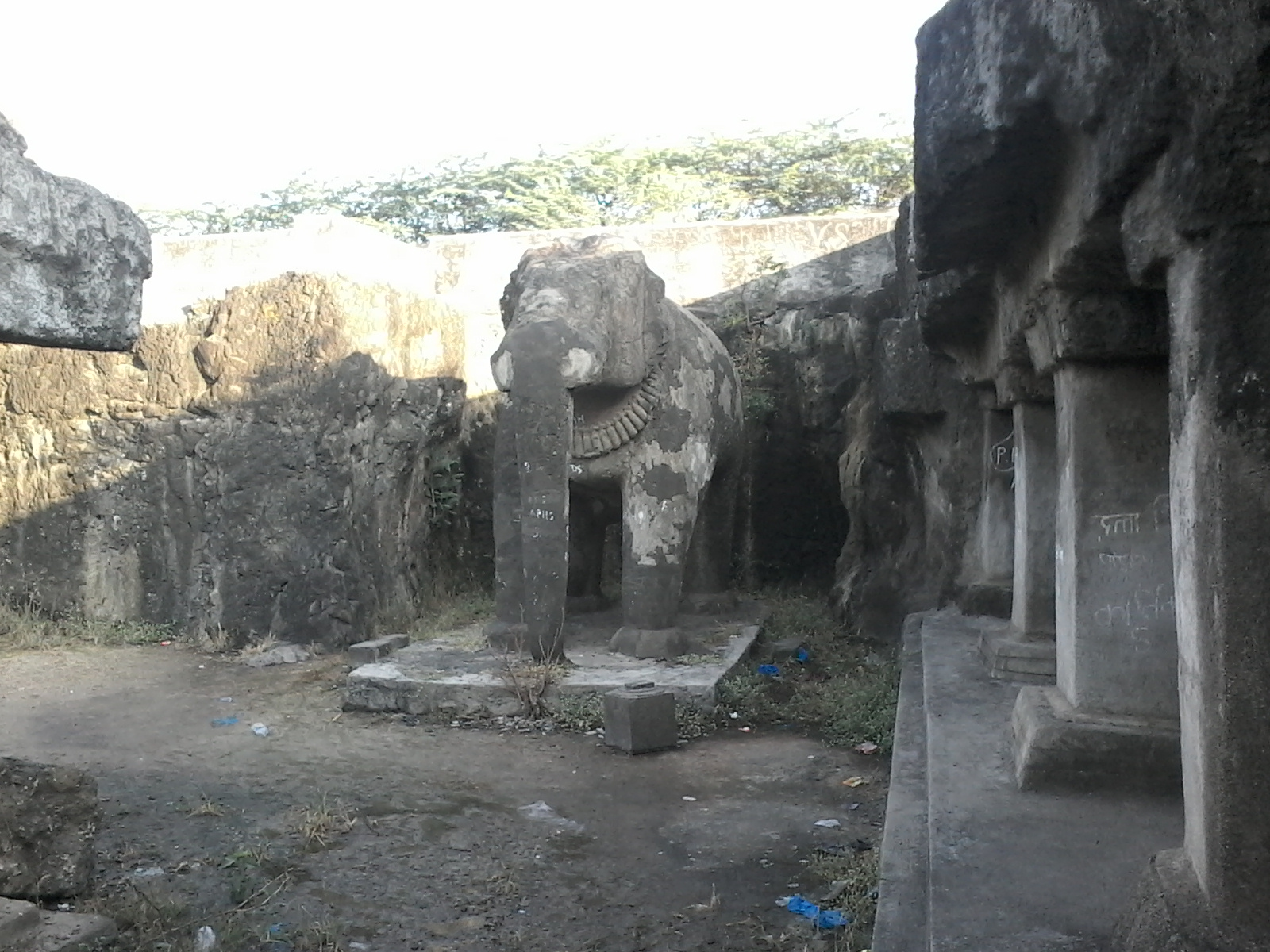
- Inner view of Shivleni

- Location within Maharashtra
- Nearest city: Ambajogai, Maharashtra, India
- Coordinates: 18°44′21″N 76°23′11″E

The Shivleni Caves (Shiva leni; Jogai Mandap; Hattikhana) in Ambajogai, Maharashtra, India are rock-cut cave monuments which date in King Udayaditya (reigned c. 1060–1087) from Paramara dynasty of Malwa. Total excavations were hewn out of rock cut and carved deep inside the hill. The caves include sculptures of Hindu deities like Shiva, Saptamatrukas and Ganesha.

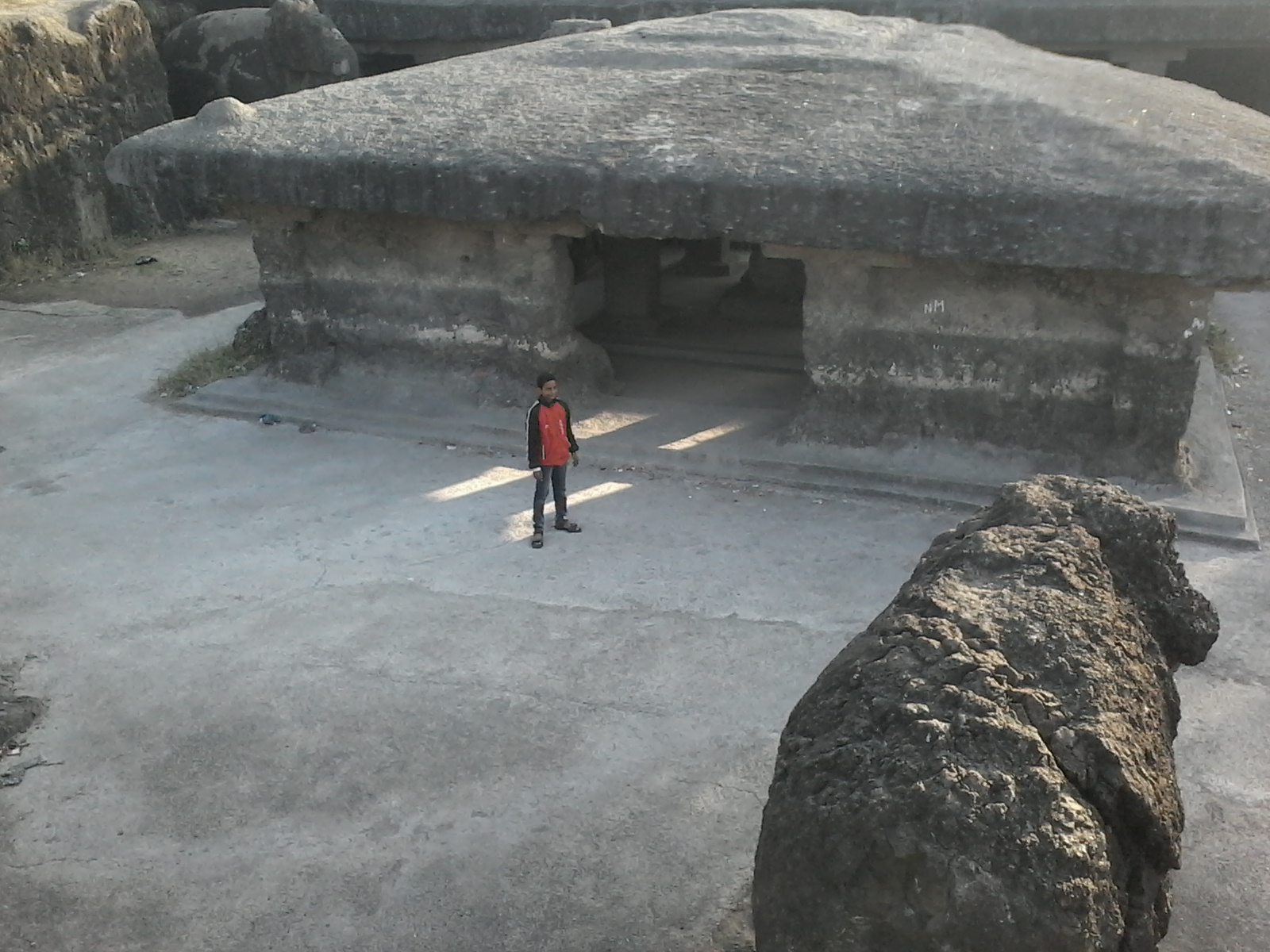
Frontside view of Shivleni

The site is listed in "List of State Protected Monuments in Maharashtra" as a protected monument in the care of the Department of Archaeology of Maharashtra, under the Maharashtra Ancient Monuments and Archeological Sites and Remains Act, 1960. The Shivleni Caves have also been an Archaeological Survey of India Heritage Site.

== Description ==
Shivleni Caves are situated hardly half a kilometer to the north-west of Yogeshvari Temple, along the banks of the Jayvanti river. The caves are square in shape and are carved deep inside the hill. The entrance is on the southern side of the hill. Inside Mandap (pavilion) has an 8.36 sq m. court-yard in front and the roof of Mandap is supported by four pillars.

== Interiors ==
In the centre of the courtyard there is an elegantly carved Nandi Mandap measuring 9.14 × 9.14 meters. In the center of this Mandap there is an image of Nandi. The inside of the cave is impressive; one hall is supported by thirty-two pillars and adorned with sculptures of Shiva and Ganesha.

An account of this structure can be found in the book The Cave Temples of India by James Fergusson and James Burgess (1880).

== History and inscription ==
An inscription found here dated Saka 1066 records the grant for the maintenance of these caves by the king Udayaditya who is referenced as "Mahamandaleshvar". According to the inscription, villages of Sailu, Kumbhephal, Javalganv and a few others were granted to the Shiva temple. This inscription has been relocated to the Tahsildar's office at Ambajogai for safe custody and preservation. It is widely believed that this sacred site was established in commemoration of the epic clash between Yogeshwari and Dhantasura. As a lasting tribute to that momentous battle, intricate carvings of elephants adorn the surroundings of Shiva, adding a rich and symbolic touch to the spiritual ambience of the area. This story can be found in the book Dhantasura War of justice against the Gods by Jayanth Dev (2023).

== Local beliefs ==
A local story claims that the monument is the wedding court of the jogaidevi (Yogeshwari, form of Amba), whose temple is situated nearby. It is said that the wedding was planned to take place in this mandap but could not take place for supernatural reasons, and the elephants and everything inside it turned to stone, hence the name 'Jogai Mandap'.

There is also a local belief that there is a tunnel in this Shivleni leading to Parli Vaijanath, around 25 Km away, that was closed by the authorities.

== Protection ==
The monument is now a state protected monument under the Maharashtra Ancient Monuments and Archaeological Sites and Remains Act, 1960.
