= Scheduled Areas =

Geographical designation in India

Scheduled Areas in India are those with a preponderance of tribal population, which are subject to a special governance mechanism wherein the central government plays a direct role in safeguarding cultural and economic interests of scheduled tribes in the area. These governance mechanisms are laid out in the Fifth and Sixth Schedules to the Constitution of India.

== Fifth Schedule area ==
The Fifth Schedule protects tribal interests in all the states except Assam, Meghalaya, Tripura and Mizoram (which are covered by the Sixth Schedule). However, all the scheduled areas where the Fifth Schedule applies are notified by the President of India. As of 2025, the President has notified scheduled areas in 10 states: Andhra Pradesh, Chhattisgarh, Gujarat, Himachal Pradesh, Jharkhand, Madhya Pradesh, Maharashtra, Odisha, Rajasthan, and Telangana. According to Adivasi organisations, these notified areas cover only about 41 percent of India's Scheduled Tribes, and the remaining 59 percent of tribals are left out.

In the Fifth Schedule areas, the governor of the state has special responsibilities with respect to tribal populations in the areas including issuing directives to the state government and limiting the effect of acts of the central or state legislature on the areas. There are also special laws applicable to the Scheduled Areas, such as the Right to Fair Compensation and Transparency in Land Acquisition, Rehabilitation and Resettlement Act 2013 and the Biological Diversity Act 2002.

== Sixth Schedule area ==
The Sixth Schedule protects tribal interests in Assam, Meghalaya, Tripura and Mizoram. The Sixth Schedule areas are called Tribal Areas rather than Scheduled Areas. The emphasis in these areas is on self-rule; tribal communities are granted considerable autonomy, including powers to make laws and receive central government funds for social and infrastructure development. To enable local control, the role of the Governor and the State are subject to significant limitations in the areas.

== See also ==
- Panchayats (Extension to Scheduled Areas) Act 1996
- Scheduled Castes and Scheduled Tribes
