= Swami Ramanand Teerth Rural Medical College =

Government Medical college in Maharashtra, India

Swami Ramanand Teerth Rural Government Medical College
- Type: Government Medical college and hospital
- Established: 1975; 51 years ago
- Affiliations: Maharashtra University of Health Sciences
- Dean: Dr. Shankar S. Dhapte
- Location: Ambajogai, Beed, Maharashtra, India; 18.7322°N 76.3708°E
- Website: www.srtrmca.org

Swami Ramanand Teerth Rural Government Medical College (SRTR GMC) is a government medical college located in Ambajogai, in the Beed district of Maharashtra, India. It is notable for being the first rural medical college in Asia. The college is named after Swami Ramanand Teerth.

== History ==
Ambajogai was a Cavalry Headquarters during the rule of the Nizam of Hyderabad. After India's independence and the subsequent integration of Hyderabad State, the cavalry grounds were vacated. The Government of Hyderabad first established a small T.B. Sanatorium in the old cavalry buildings.

== Academics ==
The first batch of 50 students was admitted in July 1975 and graduated in 1979. The Medical Council of India (MCI), impressed by the performance of the students, granted the college recognition even before the first batch had graduated

The college was formerly affiliated with Dr. Babasaheb Ambedkar Marathwada University. The college is now affiliated with the Maharashtra University of Health Sciences (MUHS), Nashik.

== Campus and infrastructure development ==
The college campus is built on the grounds of the former Cavalry headquarters. Notable infrastructure development includes:

- Hospital: The hospital's bed strength was increased to 500 in 1998. A new hospital building (Medicine Unit) was completed in 2007, housing the Departments of Paediatrics, Medicine, and the ICU.
- College Building: A new college building was completed in 2008 which housed the Dean's office and all the pre-clinical and para-clinical departments.
- Hostel: A new Resident Doctors' hostel with 124 rooms was completed in 2009 and became operational in January 2010.

== Departments ==
The college has the following departments:

- Department of Anatomy
- Department of Physiology
- Department of Biochemistry
- Department of Pharmacology
- Department of Pathology
- Department of Microbiology
- Department of Preventive and Social Medicine
- Department of Forensic Medicine and Toxicology
- Department of Medicine
- Department of Otorhinolaryngology
- Department of Surgery
- Department of Obstetrics and Gynaecology.
- Department of Pediatrics
- Department of Anesthesia
- Department of Orthopedics
- Department of Ophthalmology
- Department of Radiology
- Department of Dental
- Department of Dermatology, Venereology, and Leprosy
- Department of Chest & TB
- Department of Psychiatric

== Notable alumni ==
- Dr. Madhavrao Kinhalkar, Ex-Minister
- Ajit Gopchade, Member of Parliament
- T. P. Lahane, Padma Shri Awardee
