= Indian Treasure Trove Act, 1878 =

Act of Imperial Legislative Council of India

Imperial Legislative Council
- Enacted by: Imperial Legislative Council
- Status: In force

The Indian Treasure Trove Act, 1878 (Act No. VI of 1878.1) (12 February 1878) is an act to amend the law relating to treasures found in India. It defines treasure specifically as "anything of any value hidden in the soil" and worth as little as 10 rupees (usually around $0.15 or £0.10). This law was brought to preserve and protect artifacts of historical value found in Indian soil, such as ancient copper hoards.

== What the law details ==
The finder of any such treasure, according to this law, needs to inform the most senior local officer of the "nature and amount or approximate value of such treasure and the place where it was found". Also, if the finder fails to hand over the bounty to the government, the "share of such treasure ... shall vest in Her Majesty", the Queen of the United Kingdom.

== Law not user friendly for treasure hunters ==
Criticism as to the complexity and the subsequent irrelevance of the law in its current form has been voiced, particularly by the hobby metal detector enthusiasts and professional treasure hunters. Moreover, such criticism has been voiced as lacking incentive for treasure hunters as practically all finds belong to the local Government. However, reforms in the law are being sought.

All major metal detecting, excavations and treasure hunts per se are carried out by India's nodal agency setup for the purpose, the Archaeological Survey of India.
