= Mukundraj =

Indian writer

Mukundraj (IAST: Mukundarāja) was one of the earliest Marathi literary figures poet. Some earlier scholars dated him to the 12th century.

Scholars do not have unanimity among them about the place where Mukundraj mostly lived. He was probably born at Pauni in Bhandara district. There is a samadhi (monument) of Mukundraj at Ambajogai in the Beed district of Maharashtra Marathwada.

Mukundraj belonged to the Nath sect, and was a follower of the Adi Shankaracharya's Advaita philosophy. He wrote the religious compositions Vivek Sindhu (IAST: Vivekasindhu) and Paramamrut (IAST: Paramamṛta). Some earlier scholars dated Vivekasindhu to 1188, and believed it to be the first work of literature in Marathi language. And he was recognized as the pioneer of the Marathi language and people throughout the sections in Vidarbha region are proud followers of the Mukundraj.
