= Fifth Schedule to the Constitution of India =

The Fifth Schedule to the Constitution of India grants special powers to the State Governors to provide autonomy to the Scheduled Tribes, thereby limiting the effect of Acts of the Central and State Legislatures on the Scheduled Areas.
