= Makegaon =

Village in Maharashtra

- Village
- Location in Maharashtra, India Makegaon (India)
- Country: India
- State: Maharashtra
- District: Latur

Government
  - Type: Gram panchayat

Population (2011)
  - Total: 1,592
- Demonym: Makegaonkar

Languages
  - Official: Marathi
- Time zone: UTC+5:30 (IST)
- PIN: 413523
- Telephone code: 02382

Makegaon is a village in Renapur taluka of Latur district in Indian state of Maharashtra. It is 37 km (23 mi) from Latur city and 22 km (14 mi) from Renapur.

Pangaon to Makegaon Distance 10km,

Kingaon to Makegaon Distance 11 km

== Demography ==
Per the 2011 census, Makegaon is a village with a total 809 families residing. The village has population of 1,592, of which 825 are males while 767 are females.

The average sex ratio of the village is 930, which is higher than Maharashtra state average of 929.

The literacy rate of Makegaon village is 82%, compared to 82.34% for Maharashtra. Male literacy stands at 88% while female literacy rate is 76%.

Schedule Caste (SC) constitutes 19% in Makegaon village.
