= Yogeshvari =

Epithet of Durga

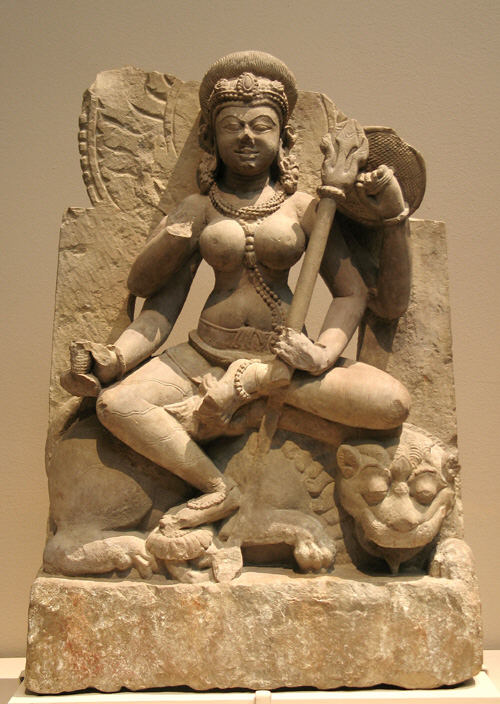
Sculpture of Durga, the primary bearer of this epithet

Yogeshvari (Sanskrit: योगेश्वरी), also rendered Jogeshvari, is an epithet of the Hindu goddess Durga, a contraction of Yoga-īśvarī, meaning "goddess of yoga". Her most prominent temple is situated in the town of Ambejogai in Beed district of Maharashtra. Other prominent temples are Jogeshwari Mandir in Pune, where she is revered as the Gramadevi or the protector deity of the city.

== Veneration ==
Many Brahmins of Western India, such as Maharashtra, Goa, Chhattisgarh, Gujarat and Rajasthan, revere Yogeshvari as their kuladevi.

Yogeshvari is the kuladevi of many Chitpavan Brahmin families and 96 kuli Maratha families in Maharashtra. Yogeshvari Aai is the feminine shakti of the deity Shiva.
