= Shankar Bapu Apegaonkar =

Indian classical musician

- Born: 1911 (age 114–115); Apegaon maharashtraIndia
- Other name: Shankar Shinde
- Occupation: Classical musician
- Known for: Pakhawaj
- Children: Udhav Shinde
- Awards: Padma Shri

Shankar Bapu Apegaonkar, born Shankar Shinde, was an Indian classical musician and an exponent of the Indian percussion instrument by name pakhawaj. Born in 1911 in a Marathi family, he followed the Varkari tradition of music. The Government of India awarded him the fourth highest Indian civilian honour of Padma Shri in 1986. Apegaonkar's son, Udhav Shinde, is also a known percussionist.

== See also ==
- Pakhawaj
