= Manav Vikas Mission =

Manav Vikas Mission (Marathi : मानव विकास मिशन) (translation: Human Development Mission) is an initiative of the Government of Maharashtra to increase Human Development Index of backward districts of Maharashtra, India. The programme was launched in 2006. Currently 125 tehsils/blocks from 23 districts come under this mission. The initiative focuses mainly on the health, income generation and education of populations in rural areas. Village students do not usually have appropriate facilities to study in the villages; the initiative provides free study rooms for village students. After observing that village girls abandon their educations midway because of the lengthy distance between high schools and villages, the state government also started providing free bus services to transport village girls from their native villages to high schools.

== Organisation and selection ==
The mission was established in 2006 in 25 talukas ("blocks") of 12 districts. In the 2010 budget it was decided to implement this mission at block level rather than at district level. In 2011, the number of blocks was further increased to 125 from 22 districts, based upon the 2001 census. Blocks were selected on the basis of two parameters; the percentage of female literacy in the block and the percentage of families living below the poverty line in the block on the basis of a 2002 survey. 125 blocks were selected from a tentative list of 175 blocks.

== Aspects ==
=== Health ===
The health aspect mainly focuses on mother and child health (MCH). It also has provisions for maintenance work on government hospital buildings in villages. Pregnant women are motivated to deliver their babies in hospitals rather than in their homes. Rural women usually work on farms until the ninth month of their pregnancies; in this scheme government provides ₹4,000 (US$47) to women who deliver in hospital as "lost wages"—the income that a woman loses because of her stay in hospital during pregnancy.

=== Education ===
The educational aspect includes the creation of study centres for village students, free bus services for girls, installing solar-powered lighting in village schools and providing books. The scheme also provides for the creation of Balbhavan at the block level. Study rooms are made available mainly for students from 8th standard to 12th standard. Students whose educational standards are low are especially invited to the centres and more focus is given to them by teachers.

=== Income generation ===
Under the scheme, modern agriculture instruments are made available to farmers.

== Effects ==
According to analysts, free bus services for village girls have been effective in reducing dropout rates of female students. Provision of the "lost wages" has increased the rate of hospital deliveries, which have reduced the local maternal mortality rate and infant mortality rate. However, many study centres exists only "on paper" because of bureaucracy. Officials of the education department also seem to ignore the inspection of such study centres. The state government has reduced the scheme's budget in 2015. The Human Development Index (HDI) has not improved much from 2001 to 2011. There is also only a slight improvement in per capita incomes.
