= Beed Lok Sabha constituency =

Lok Sabha constituency in Maharashtra

Coordinates: 18°59′10.79″N 75°46′1.86″E

Beed
- Lok Sabha constituency
- Beed Lok Sabha Constituency map

Constituency details
- Country: India
- Region: Western India
- State: Maharashtra
- Assembly constituencies: Georai; Majalgaon; Beed; Ashti; Kaij; Parli
- Established: 1952–present
- Reservation: None

Member of Parliament
- 18th Lok Sabha
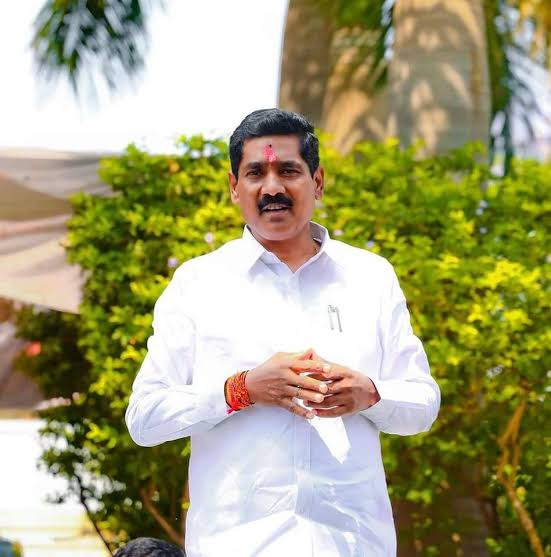
- Incumbent Bajrang Manohar Sonwane
- Party: NCP-SP
- Alliance: INDIA
- Elected year: 2024
- Preceded by: Pritam Munde

Beed Lok Sabha constituency formerly, Bhir Lok Sabha constituency is one of the 48 Lok Sabha (parliamentary) constituencies in Maharashtra state in western India. This constituency was formed in 1951, as one of the 25 constituencies of erstwhile Hyderabad State. This constituency consists of 2056860 (20 Lakh 56 thousand and 860) voters in which 1086818 (10 Lakh 86 Thousand 818) Males, 970037 (9 Lakh 70 Thousand 37) Females and 5 others until 4 October 2019.

The candidate, Bajrang Manohar Sonwane won the seat in the 2024 elections by defeating Pankaja Munde with a nominal margin of 6553 votes.

== Assembly segments ==
At present, Beed Lok Sabha constituency comprises six Vidhan Sabha (legislative assembly) segments as follows:

No	Name	District	Member	Party	Leading (in 2024)
228	Georai	Beed	Vijaysinh Pandit	NCP	NCP-SP
229	Majalgaon	Beed	Prakashdada Solanke	NCP	BJP
230	Beed	Beed	Sandeep Kshirsagar	NCP-SP	NCP-SP
231	Ashti	Beed	Suresh Dhas	BJP	BJP
232	Kaij (SC)	Beed	Namita Mundada	BJP	NCP-SP
233	Parli	Beed	Dhananjay Munde	NCP	BJP

== Members of Parliament ==
Year	Name	Party
1952	Ramchander Paranjape	People's Democratic Front
1957	Rakhamji Dhondiba Patil	Indian National Congress
1962	Dwarkadasji Mantri	Indian National Congress
1967	Nana Patil	Communist Party of India
1971	Sayajirao Trimbakrao Pandit	Indian National Congress (R)
1977	Gangadhar Appa Burande	Communist Party of India (Marxist)
1980	Kesarbai Kshirsagar	Indian National Congress
1984	Kesarbai Kshirsagar	Indian National Congress
1989	Babanrao Dhakne	Janata Dal
1991	Kesarbai Kshirsagar	Indian National Congress
1996	Rajani Ashokrao Patil	Bharatiya Janata Party
1998	Jaisingrao Gaikwad Patil	Bharatiya Janata Party
1999	Jaisingrao Gaikwad Patil	Bharatiya Janata Party
2004	Jaisingrao Gaikwad Patil	Nationalist Congress Party
2009	Gopinath Munde	Bharatiya Janata Party
2014	Gopinath Munde	Bharatiya Janata Party
2014^	Pritam Munde	Bharatiya Janata Party
2019	Pritam Munde	Bharatiya Janata Party
2024	Bajrang Manohar Sonwane	Nationalist Congress Party - Sharadchandra Pawar

== Election results ==
=== 2024 ===
2024 Indian general elections: Beed
Party	Candidate	Votes	%	±%
NCP-SP	Bajrang Manohar Sonwane	683,950	44.93	New
BJP	Pankaja Munde	6,77,397	44.50	▼5.65
Bahujan Maha Party	Ashok Bhagoji Thorat	54,850	3.60	N/A
VBA	Ashok Sukhdev Hinge	50,867	3.34	▼3.47
NOTA	None of the Above	2,087	0.14	▼0.04
Majority		6,553	0.43	▼12.02
Turnout		15,24,570	71.01	
NCP-SP gain from BJP		Swing		

=== 2019 ===
2019 Indian general elections: Beed
Party	Candidate	Votes	%	±%
BJP	Pritam Gopinathrao Munde	678,175	50.15	▼20.10
NCP	Bajrang Manohar Sonwane	5,09,807	37.70	▲37.70
VBA	Prof. Vishnu Jadhav	92,139	6.81	New
Independent	Sampat Ramsing Chavan	16,792	1.24	
Independent	Mujib Naimuddin Inamdar	6,152	0.45	
NOTA	None of the Above	2,500	0.18	
Majority		1,68,368	12.45	
Turnout		13,53,442	66.17	
BJP hold		Swing		

=== 2014 by-election ===
Bye-Election, 2014: Beed
Party	Candidate	Votes	%	±%
BJP	Pritam Gopinathrao Munde	922,416	70.25	+18.64
INC	Ashokrao Shankarrao Patil	2,26,095	17.22	N/A
Independent	Tejas Ankush Ghumare	59,986	4.56	+4.13
BSP	Dwarka Piraji Kamble	21,099	1.63	+0.48
Independent	Tukaram Vithoba Ugale	18,007	1.37	N/A
NOTA	None of the Above	14,789	1.12	+0.93
Majority		6,96,321	53.03	+41.96
Turnout		13,13,092	71.44	+2.74
BJP hold		Swing		

=== 2014 election ===
2014 Indian general elections: Beed
Party	Candidate	Votes	%	±%
BJP	Gopinathrao Pandurang Munde	635,995	51.61	+0.03
NCP	Suresh Ramchandra Dhas	4,99,541	40.54	+2.09
BSP	Digambar Ramrao Rathod	14,166	1.15	−1.20
Independent	Prakash Bhagwanrao Solanke	8,634	0.70	N/A
Independent	Ashok Dhondiba Sonwane	5,383	0.44	N/A
NOTA	None of the Above	2,323	0.19	N/A
Majority		1,36,454	11.07	−2.92
Turnout		12,32,200	68.74	+3.15
BJP hold		Swing		

=== 2009 election ===
2009 Indian general elections: Beed
Party	Candidate	Votes	%	±%
BJP	Gopinathrao Pandurang Munde	553,994	51.58	+8.87
NCP	Rameshrao Baburao Kokate	4,13,042	38.46	−9.61
BSP	Machindra Baburao Maske	25,284	2.35	+0.38
BBM	Kacharu Santaramji Khalge	11,006	1.02	
Independent	Akram Salimuddin Bagwan	9,883	0.92	
Majority		1,40,952	13.12	+7.76
Turnout		10,73,983	65.59	−1.44
BJP gain from NCP		Swing		

=== 2004 election ===
2004 Indian general elections: Beed
Party	Candidate	Votes	%	±%
NCP	Jaisingrao Gaikwad Patil	425,051	48.07%	
BJP	Prakash Sundarrao Solanke	3,77,639	42.71%	
Majority		47,412		
Turnout		8,84,234	60.00%	
NCP gain from BJP		Swing		

=== 1999 election ===
1999 Indian general elections: Beed
Party	Candidate	Votes	%	±%
BJP	Jaisingrao Gaikwad Patil	332,946	41.20%	
NCP	Radhakrishna Sahebrao Patil	2,81,756	34.87%	
INC	Ashok Patil	1,62,478	20.11%	
Majority		51,190		
Turnout		8,08,082	72.42%	
BJP hold		Swing		

=== 1998 election ===
1998 Indian general election: Beed
Party	Candidate	Votes	%	±%
BJP	Jaisingrao Gaikwad Patil	300,307	46.45%	
INC	Ashok Patil	2,94,204	45.50%	
PWPI	B. N. Deshmukh	21,256	3.29%	
Majority		6,103		
Turnout		8,00,917	61.40%	
BJP hold		Swing		

=== 1996 election ===
1996 Indian general election: Beed
Party	Candidate	Votes	%	±%
BJP	Rajni Patil	279,995	43.41%	
INC	Kesharbai Kshirsagar	2,22,535	34.50%	
PWPI	Sushila Ganapatrao Morale	73,900	3.29%	
Majority		57,460		
Turnout		6,44,962	57.51%	
BJP gain from INC		Swing		

=== 1991 election ===
1991 Indian general election: Beed
Party	Candidate	Votes	%	±%
INC	Kesharbai Kshirsagar	260,035	43.55%	
BJP	Sadashiv Sitaram Munde	1,72,409	28.87%	
JD	Nayamurti Kosle Patil	1,36,573	22.87%	
Majority		87,626		
Turnout		5,97,155	53.69%	
INC gain from BJP		Swing		

=== 1989 election ===
1989 Indian general election: Beed
Party	Candidate	Votes	%	±%
JD	Babanrao Dhakne	229,496	37.79%	
INC	Kesharbai Kshirsagar	2,27,511	37.46%	
BJP	Sadashiv Sitaram Munde	1,33,760	22.03%	
Majority		1,985		
Turnout		6,07,293	56.28%	
JD gain from INC		Swing		

=== 1984 election ===
1984 Indian general election: Beed
Party	Candidate	Votes	%	±%
INC	Kesharbai Kshirsagar	221,421	48.54%	
Independent	Shridharrao Gangaramji Gite	1,11,059	24.35%	
BJP	Adinath Limbajirao Navel	1,02,260	22.87%	
Majority		1,10,362		
Turnout		4,56,168	54.64%	
INC gain from INC(I)		Swing		

=== 1980 election ===
1980 Indian general election: Beed
Party	Candidate	Votes	%	±%
INC(I)	Kesharbai Kshirsagar	203,870	55.26%	
INC(U)	Raghunathrao Vyankatrao Munde	1,36,367	36.96%	
Majority		67,503		
Turnout		3,68,929	47.38%	
INC(I) gain from CPI(M)		Swing		

=== 1977 election ===
1977 Indian general election: Beed
Party	Candidate	Votes	%	±%
CPI(M)	Gangadhar Appa Burande	197,497	57.56%	
INC	Laxman Shankarao Deshmukh	1,45,600	42.44%	
Majority		51,897		
Turnout		3,43,097	50.76%	
CPI(M) gain from INC		Swing		

=== 1971 election ===
1971 Indian general election: Beed
Party	Candidate	Votes	%	±%
INC	Sayajirao Trimbakrao Pandit	187,132	69.50%	
CPI(M)	Gangadhar Appa Burande	32,551	12.09%	
CPI	Kashinath Tatyaba Jadhav	22,787	8.46%	
Majority		1,10,362		
Turnout		2,69,273	48.01%	
INC gain from CPI		Swing		

=== 1967 election ===
1967 Indian general election: Beed
Party	Candidate	Votes	%	±%
CPI	Nana Patil	125,216	47.91%	
INC	Dawarkadasji M. Mantri	1,11,119	42.51%	
ABJS	N. K. Mandhane	25,033	9.58%	
Majority		14,097		
Turnout		2,61,368	52.34%	
CPI gain from INC		Swing		

=== 1962 election ===
1962 Indian general election: Beed
Party	Candidate	Votes	%	±%
INC	Dwarkadasji Motilalji Mantri	95,700	56.01%	
CPI	A. H. A. Babar	75,171	43.99%	
Majority		20,529		
Turnout		1,70,871	41.46%	
INC gain from CPI		Swing		

=== 1957 election ===
1957 Indian general election: Beed
Party	Candidate	Votes	%	±%
INC	Rakhamaji Dhondiba Patil	66,013	53.19%	
CPI	Kashinath Tatyaba Jadhav	58,090	46.81%	
Majority		7,923		
Turnout		1,24,103	32.84%	
INC gain from PDF		Swing		

=== 1951 election ===
1951 Indian general election: Beed
Party	Candidate	Votes	%	±%
PDF	Ramchander Govind Paranjppe	67,752	53.66%	
INC	Shridhar Vaman Naik	58,501	46.34%	
Majority		9,251		
Turnout		1,26,253	36.64%	
PDF win (new seat)				

== See also ==
- Beed district
- List of constituencies of the Lok Sabha
