= Mundada =

Mundada is a surname. Notable people with the surname include:

- Jaiprakash Shankarlal Mundada, Indian politician
- Namita Mundada (born 1989), Indian politician
- Vimal Mundada (c. 1963–2012), Indian politician
