= Sangeeta Thombre =

Indian politician

Sangeeta Thombre (born 1978) is an Indian politician from Maharashtra. She is a former member of the Maharashtra Legislative Assembly from Kaij Assembly constituency, which is reserved for Scheduled Caste community in Beed district, representing the Bharatiya Janata Party.

== Early life ==
Thombre is from Kaij, Beed district, Maharashtra. She married Thombare Vijayprakash. She completed her BA at Shivaji Vidyapith, Kolhapur in 1998 and did MA in english, also at Shivaji Vidyapith in 2000. She later obtained a BEd degree from S.R.T.M, Nanded in 2009. She is a housewife and her husband is in government service. She declared assets worth Rs.1 crore in her affidavit to the Election Commission of India.

== Career ==
Thombre won the Kaij Assembly constituency in the 2014 Maharashtra Legislative Assembly election representing the Bharatiya Janata Party. She polled 1,06,834 votes and defeated her nearest rival, Namita Mundada of the Nationalist Congress Party (NCP), by a margin of 42,721 votes. Earlier, she lost the 2012 bypoll to Prithviraj Sathe of the Natiionalist Congress Party by a margin of 8500 votes.
