= R. T. Deshmukh =

Indian politician (died 2025)

R. T. (Jija) Deshmukh

Member of the Maharashtra Legislative Assembly for Majalgaon
- In office 2014–2019
- Preceded by: Prakashdada Solanke
- Succeeded by: Prakashdada Solanke

Personal details
- Died: 26 May 2025
- Party: Bharatiya Janata Party

R. T. (Jija) Deshmukh (died 26 May 2025) was an Indian politician who was a member of the 13th Maharashtra Legislative Assembly. He represented the Majalgaon Assembly constituency. R.T. Jija Deshmukh was a prominent political figure in the Beed district and he was known as a staunch supporter and close associate of the former Chief Minister of Maharashtra late Gopinath Munde Saheb as well as his brother & father of Dhananjay Munde late Pandit Anna Munde.

Deshmukh died in a road traffic collision on the Tuljapur-Latur road near Belkund, Maharashtra, on 26 May 2025.
