= 2012 Maharashtra panchayat elections =

Zilla Parishad elections in India

2012 Maharashtra Zilla Parishad Elections
- 21 March 2012

Total 1639 Seats spread over 27 Zilla Parishads
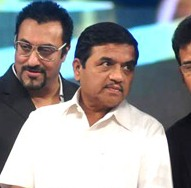

	Majority party	Minority party
Leader	R.R. Patil	Prithviraj Chavan
Party	NCP	INC
Alliance	UPA	UPA
Seats won	526	459
	Third party	Fourth party
Leader	Uddhav Thackeray	Gopinath Munde
Party	SS	BJP
Alliance	NDA	NDA
Seats won	256	198

Elections for over 27 Zilla Parishads in Maharashtra, India, were held on 21 March 2012.

The main contenders were the ruling United Progressive Alliance consisting of Indian National Congress and Nationalist Congress Party on one side and the opposition National Democratic Alliance consisting of Shiv Sena and Bharatiya Janata Party on the other side.

The Incumbent United Progressive Alliance won in plurality by winning 985 seats out of 1639 spread over 27 Zilla Parishads in Maharashtra, the Opposition whereas won about 454 Seats.

Party	Alliance	Seats	Alliance Seats
Nationalist Congress Party	United Progressive Alliance	526 / 1,639 (32%)	985 / 1,639 (60%)
Indian National Congress	United Progressive Alliance	459 / 1,639 (28%)	985 / 1,639 (60%)
Shiv Sena	National Democratic Alliance	256 / 1,639 (16%)	454 / 1,639 (28%)
Bharatiya Janata Party	National Democratic Alliance	198 / 1,639 (12%)	454 / 1,639 (28%)

== Zilla Parishad Results ==
Sr.no	ZP	Seats	NCP	INC	SHS	BJP
1	THANE	66	26	01	15	11
2	RAIGAD	62	20	07	14	01
3	RATNAGIRI	57	19	03	25	07
4	SINDHUDURG	50	10	33	04	03
5	NASHIK	73	27	14	17	04
6	JALGAON	69	16	31	06	01
7	AHMEDNAGAR	68	20	10	15	23
8	PUNE	75	32	28	06	06
9	SANGLI	75	42	11	12	03
10	SATARA	62	33	23	00	00
11	SOLAPUR	67	39	21	00	00
12	KOLHAPUR	68	33	18	00	00
13	AURANGABAD	60	10	16	17	06
14	JALNA	55	16	03	15	15
15	PARBHANI	52	25	08	11	02
16	HINGOLI	50	10	09	27	00
17	BEED	59	29	01	02	20
18	NANDED	63	18	25	09	04
19	OSMANABAD	54	20	20	12	02
20	LATUR	58	09	35	05	08
21	AMRAVATI	59	07	25	07	09
22	BULDHANA	59	13	22	11	04
23	YAVATMAL	62	21	23	12	04
24	NAGPUR	59	07	19	08	22
25	WARDHA	51	08	17	01	17
26	CHANDRAPUR	57	07	21	02	18
27	GADCHIROLI	49	09	15	02	08
		1639	526	459	256	198
