= Majalgaon Assembly constituency =

Constituency of the Maharashtra legislative assembly in India

Coordinates: 19.164°N 76.205°E

Majalgaon
- Constituency No. 229 for the Maharashtra Legislative Assembly

Constituency details
- Country: India
- Region: Western India
- State: Maharashtra
- District: Beed
- Lok Sabha constituency: Beed
- Established: 1952
- Total electors: 352,698
- Reservation: None

Member of Legislative Assembly
- 15th Maharashtra Legislative Assembly
- Incumbent Prakashdada Solanke
- Party: NCP
- Alliance: NDA
- Elected year: 2024

Majalgaon Assembly constituency (formerly Manjlegaon) is one of the 288 Vidhan Sabha (legislative assembly) constituencies of Maharashtra state in western India.

Majalgaon (constituency number 229) is one of the six Vidhan Sabha constituencies located in the Beed district. It covers the entire Dharur and Wadwani tehsils and part of Majalgaon tehsil of this district.

Majalgaon is part of the Beed Lok Sabha constituency along with all other Vidhan Sabha segments in this district, namely Georai, Parli, Beed, Ashti and Kaij.

== Members of the Legislative Assembly ==
Election	Member	Party
1952	Limbaji Muktaji	People's Democratic Front
1957	Sabderali S/o Sujatali	Indian National Congress
1962	Sripad Rao Kadam	Indian National Congress
1967	Sankeran Nathu Tribhuwan	Indian National Congress
1972	Sankeran Nathu Tribhuwan	Indian National Congress
1978	Sundarrao Abasaheb Solanke	Indian National Congress
1980	Govindrao Sitaram Dak	Indian National Congress (U)
1985	Mohanrao Digambarrao Solunke	Indian Congress (Socialist)
1990	Radhakrishna Patil	Indian National Congress
1995	Bajirao Sonaji Jagtap	Independent politician
1999	Prakashdada Solanke	Bharatiya Janata Party
2004	Prakashdada Solanke	Bharatiya Janata Party
2009	Prakashdada Solanke	Nationalist Congress Party
2014	R. T. Deshmukh	Bharatiya Janata Party
2019	Prakashdada Solanke	Nationalist Congress Party
2024	Prakashdada Solanke	Nationalist Congress Party

== Election results ==
=== Assembly Election 2024 ===
2024 Maharashtra Legislative Assembly election : Majalgaon
Party	Candidate	Votes	%	±%
NCP	Prakashdada Solanke	66,009	27.68%	New
NCP-SP	Mohan Bajirao Jagtap	60,110	25.21%	New
Independent	Ramesh Baburao Kokate (Adaskar)	38,981	16.35%	New
Independent	Madhav Ambadas Nirmal	34,767	14.58%	New
Bahujan Maha Party	Babari (Fulchand)rajabhau Munde	18,059	7.57%	New
VBA	Manjur Shaikh Chand Sahab Shaikh	5,327	2.23%	New
Independent	Prakash Dada Bhagawanrao Solanke	1,530	0.64%	New
RRP	Shrisagar Prashant Babruvan	1,512	0.63%	New
NOTA	None of the above	530	0.22%	▼0.12
Margin of victory		5,899	2.47%	▼3.19
Turnout		238,987	67.76%	▼1.39
Total valid votes		238,457		
Registered electors		352,698		▲6.37
Nationalist Congress Party (post–2023) gain from NCP		Swing	▼21.35	

=== Assembly Election 2019 ===
2019 Maharashtra Legislative Assembly election : Majalgaon
Party	Candidate	Votes	%	±%
NCP	Prakashdada Solanke	111,566	49.03%	▲13.72
BJP	Ramesh Baburao Kokate (Adaskar)	98,676	43.36%	▼9.42
Independent	Dhammanand Shankarrao Salve	5,005	2.20%	New
AIMIM	Shaikh Amar Jainoddin	2,792	1.23%	New
Independent	Ejaj Shaikh Umar Shaikh	2,095	0.92%	New
NOTA	None of the above	780	0.34%	▲0.01
Margin of victory		12,890	5.66%	▼11.81
Turnout		229,297	69.15%	▼3.98
Total valid votes		227,556		
Registered electors		331,571		▲13.21
NCP gain from BJP		Swing	▼3.75	

=== Assembly Election 2014 ===
2014 Maharashtra Legislative Assembly election : Majalgaon
Party	Candidate	Votes	%	±%
BJP	R. T. Deshmukh	112,497	52.78%	▲10.77
NCP	Prakashdada Solanke	75,252	35.31%	▼10.91
INC	Hoke Patil Narayan Laxmanrao	4,858	2.28%	New
SS	Solanke Satish Narayanrao	3,949	1.85%	New
Independent	Solanke Prakash (Dada) Bhagwanrao	3,121	1.46%	New
Independent	Ranganath Nikam	2,107	0.99%	New
BSP	Shaikh Karim Sallabuddin	1,861	0.87%	▼0.17
BBM	Salve Dhammanand Shankararao	1,358	0.64%	New
NOTA	None of the above	693	0.33%	New
Margin of victory		37,245	17.47%	▲13.27
Turnout		214,175	73.13%	▲1.93
Total valid votes		213,135		
Registered electors		292,888		▲10.83
BJP gain from NCP		Swing	▲6.56	

=== Assembly Election 2009 ===
2009 Maharashtra Legislative Assembly election : Majalgaon
Party	Candidate	Votes	%	±%
NCP	Prakashdada Solanke	86,943	46.22%	▲24.71
BJP	R. T. Deshmukh	79,034	42.01%	▲0.09
PWPI	Thawre Gangabhishan Kashinath Rao	10,077	5.36%	▼13.69
Independent	Jadhavar Chandrakantrao Vitthalrao	2,133	1.13%	New
BSP	Tonde Mahadev Sampatti	1,948	1.04%	▼2.43
Independent	Solanke Prakash	1,780	0.95%	New
Prabuddha Republican Party	Dr. Gorakh Gaikwad Wagholikar	1,535	0.82%	New
Independent	Shaikh Ejajbabar Ismail	1,207	0.64%	New
Margin of victory		7,909	4.20%	▼16.21
Turnout		188,173	71.20%	▼0.83
Total valid votes		188,111		
Registered electors		264,278		▲10.94
NCP gain from BJP		Swing	▲4.30	

=== Assembly Election 2004 ===
2004 Maharashtra Legislative Assembly election : Majalgaon
Party	Candidate	Votes	%	±%
BJP	Prakashdada Solanke	71,937	41.92%	▼6.08
NCP	Jagtap Bajirao Sonaji	36,907	21.51%	▼6.61
PWPI	Thawre Gangabhishan Kashinath Rao	32,694	19.05%	▲18.22
CPI(M)	Dake Datta Jijaba	6,067	3.54%	New
BSP	Dr. Urne Vasantrao Vishwanathrao	5,961	3.47%	New
Independent	Vitthaldada Lagad	5,886	3.43%	New
Independent	Shaikh Jalal	2,219	1.29%	New
RLD	Shaikh Ejajbabar Ismail	1,545	0.90%	New
Margin of victory		35,030	20.41%	▲0.54
Turnout		171,596	72.03%	▼4.03
Total valid votes		171,593		
Registered electors		238,225		▲20.68
BJP hold		Swing	▼6.08	

=== Assembly Election 1999 ===
1999 Maharashtra Legislative Assembly election : Majalgaon
Party	Candidate	Votes	%	±%
BJP	Prakashdada Solanke	67,303	48.00%	▲42.14
NCP	Bajirao Sonaji Jagtap	39,436	28.12%	New
INC	Arun Rambhau Ingle	20,097	14.33%	▼7.61
Independent	Sk. Jalal Sk. Khairuddin	3,952	2.82%	New
ABHM	Dr. Bhagwanrao Khanderao Sarwade	3,525	2.51%	New
Independent	Pawar Barikrao Motiram	3,384	2.41%	New
PWPI	Thawre Gangabhishan Kashinath Rao	1,166	0.83%	New
Margin of victory		27,867	19.87%	▲19.58
Turnout		150,147	76.06%	▲5.73
Total valid votes		140,222		
Registered electors		197,395		▲1.87
BJP gain from Independent		Swing	▲25.76	

=== Assembly Election 1995 ===
1995 Maharashtra Legislative Assembly election : Majalgaon
Party	Candidate	Votes	%	±%
Independent	Bajirao Sonaji Jagtap	29,461	22.24%	New
INC	Radhakrishna Sahebrao Patil	29,073	21.94%	▼30.27
Independent	Prakashdada Solanke	27,897	21.05%	New
BBM	Bhagwanrao Khanderao Sarwade	9,527	7.19%	New
BJP	Panjabrao Maske Patil	7,761	5.86%	New
Independent	Mohanrao Digambarrao Solunke	6,552	4.95%	New
JD	Sudhakar Kishanrao Deshmukh	4,481	3.38%	New
PWPI	Gangabhishan Kashinath Rao Thawre	3,026	2.28%	New
Margin of victory		388	0.29%	▼32.95
Turnout		136,282	70.33%	▲12.05
Total valid votes		132,497		
Registered electors		193,777		▼0.85
Independent gain from INC		Swing	▼29.97	

=== Assembly Election 1990 ===
1990 Maharashtra Legislative Assembly election : Majalgaon
Party	Candidate	Votes	%	±%
INC	Radhakrishna Sahebrao Patil	58,209	52.21%	▲8.68
Independent	Narayan Govindrao Dak	21,149	18.97%	New
SS	Bajirao Sonaji Jagtap	19,646	17.62%	New
CPI(M)	Gangadhar Appa Burande	8,926	8.01%	▲2.21
Independent	Jadhauar Mahadeo Sahebrao	805	0.72%	New
Margin of victory		37,060	33.24%	▲30.94
Turnout		113,902	58.28%	▲4.45
Total valid votes		111,487		
Registered electors		195,435		▲26.61
INC gain from IC(S)		Swing	▲6.38	

=== Assembly Election 1985 ===
1985 Maharashtra Legislative Assembly election : Majalgaon
Party	Candidate	Votes	%	±%
IC(S)	Mohanrao Digambarrao Solunke	37,200	45.83%	New
INC	Radhakrishna Sahebrao Patil	35,331	43.53%	New
CPI(M)	Sarjerao Ranjwan	4,712	5.80%	▼6.60
RPI	Vithalrao Maribarao Takankhar	2,142	2.64%	New
Independent	Mirza Faizulla Baig Ahmad Baig	1,161	1.43%	New
Independent	Dayanand Sridhar Rao Swami	628	0.77%	New
Margin of victory		1,869	2.30%	▼0.82
Turnout		83,093	53.83%	▼8.94
Total valid votes		81,174		
Registered electors		154,364		▲12.29
IC(S) gain from INC(U)		Swing	▲2.44	

=== Assembly Election 1980 ===
1980 Maharashtra Legislative Assembly election : Majalgaon
Party	Candidate	Votes	%	±%
INC(U)	Govindrao Sitaram Dak	36,296	43.39%	New
INC(I)	Sundarrao Solanke	33,688	40.27%	New
CPI(M)	Gangadharappa Burande	10,370	12.40%	▼30.80
Independent	Murlidhar Balaji Wadmare	1,069	1.28%	New
Independent	Mirza Faizulla Baig Ahmad Baig	956	1.14%	New
Independent	Chopde Motiram Limbaji	571	0.68%	New
Margin of victory		2,608	3.12%	▼6.57
Turnout		86,284	62.77%	▼7.15
Total valid votes		83,652		
Registered electors		137,469		▲11.15
INC(U) gain from INC		Swing	▼9.50	

=== Assembly Election 1978 ===
1978 Maharashtra Legislative Assembly election : Majalgaon
Party	Candidate	Votes	%	±%
INC	Sundarrao Solanke	43,762	52.89%	▼0.47
CPI(M)	Bapusaheb Eknathrao	35,743	43.20%	▲23.66
Independent	Gangane Wamanrao Marutirao	2,273	2.75%	New
Independent	Sonavane Shriram Madhav	968	1.17%	New
Margin of victory		8,019	9.69%	▼24.13
Turnout		86,474	69.92%	▲34.10
Total valid votes		82,746		
Registered electors		123,680		▲26.38
INC hold		Swing	▼0.47	

=== Assembly Election 1972 ===
1972 Maharashtra Legislative Assembly election : Majalgaon
Party	Candidate	Votes	%	±%
INC	Sankeran Nathu Tribhuwan	17,759	53.36%	▲6.07
CPI(M)	Chakre Babu Sadashiv	6,502	19.54%	New
Independent	Sudan Waman Rao Rajbhoi	5,021	15.09%	New
RPI	Vithal Rao Mariba Rao	3,424	10.29%	▼13.82
Independent	Ram Chandrarao More	577	1.73%	New
Margin of victory		11,257	33.82%	▲11.30
Turnout		35,053	35.82%	▼6.67
Total valid votes		33,283		
Registered electors		97,866		▲16.76
INC hold		Swing	▲6.07	

=== Assembly Election 1967 ===
1967 Maharashtra Legislative Assembly election : Majalgaon
Party	Candidate	Votes	%	±%
INC	Sankeran Nathu Tribhuwan	15,426	47.29%	▼7.15
ABJS	R. L. Ghadale	8,080	24.77%	New
RPI	B. A. Maske	7,864	24.11%	New
Independent	A. Dwarku	1,248	3.83%	New
Margin of victory		7,346	22.52%	▲13.65
Turnout		35,613	42.49%	▲2.96
Total valid votes		32,618		
Registered electors		83,821		▲20.68
INC hold		Swing	▼7.15	

=== Assembly Election 1962 ===
1962 Maharashtra Legislative Assembly election : Majalgaon
Party	Candidate	Votes	%	±%
INC	Sripad Rao Kadam	13,881	54.44%	▲7.06
CPI	Gangadharappa Burande	11,618	45.56%	▲23.43
Margin of victory		2,263	8.87%	▼8.02
Turnout		27,458	39.53%	▲16.05
Total valid votes		25,499		
Registered electors		69,460		▲20.14
INC hold		Swing	▲7.06	

=== Assembly Election 1957 ===
1957 Bombay State Legislative Assembly election : Manjlegaon
Party	Candidate	Votes	%	±%
INC	Sabderali S/o Sujatali	6,432	47.38%	▲19.20
Independent	Bansidherrao S/o Kesheorao	4,139	30.49%	New
CPI	Athar Babar S/o Ahmed Husain	3,004	22.13%	New
Margin of victory		2,293	16.89%	▼13.21
Turnout		13,575	23.48%	▼10.22
Total valid votes		13,575		
Registered electors		57,814		▲6.76
INC gain from PDF		Swing	▼10.90	

=== Assembly Election 1952 ===
1952 Hyderabad State Legislative Assembly election : Manjlegaon
Party	Candidate	Votes	%	±%
PDF	Limbaji Muktaji	10,635	58.28%	New
INC	Nasik Vasudevrao	5,142	28.18%	New
PWPI	Jadhav Dyanobarao	1,081	5.92%	New
Independent	Bahega Whankar Samrao	1,015	5.56%	New
Independent	Sirsalkar	374	2.05%	New
Margin of victory		5,493	30.10%	
Turnout		18,247	33.70%	
Total valid votes		18,247		
Registered electors		54,151		
PDF win (new seat)				

== See also ==
- Manjlegaon
- List of constituencies of Maharashtra Vidhan Sabha
