= Beed Assembly constituency =

Constituency of the Maharashtra legislative assembly in India

Coordinates: 18°59′10.79″N 75°46′1.86″E

Beed
- Constituency No. 230 for the Maharashtra Legislative Assembly

Constituency details
- Country: India
- Region: Western India
- State: Maharashtra
- District: Beed
- Lok Sabha constituency: Beed
- Established: 1962
- Total electors: 384,885
- Reservation: None

Member of Legislative Assembly
- 15th Maharashtra Legislative Assembly
- Incumbent Sandeep Kshirsagar
- Party: NCP-SP
- Alliance: MVA
- Elected year: 2024

Beed Assembly constituency is one of the 288 Vidhan Sabha (legislative assembly) constituencies of Maharashtra state in western India.

== Overview ==
Beed (constituency number 230) is one of the six Vidhan Sabha constituencies located in Beed district. It comprises parts of the Shirur and Beed tehsils of this district.

Beed is part of the Beed Lok Sabha constituency along with all other Vidhan Sabha segments in this district, namely Parli, Majalgaon, Georai, Ashti and Kaij.

This Vidhan Sabha constituency consist 335150 (3 Lack 35 Thousand 150) Voters In Which 178768 Male's, 156379 Female's And 3 Others Till 4 October 2019.

== Members of Legislative Assembly ==
Year	Member	Party
1962	Kashinath Jadhav	Communist Party of India
1967	Shivajirao Patil	Indian National Congress
1978	Aadinath Nawle	Janata Party
1980	Rajendra Jagtap	Indian National Congress (U)
1985	Sirajoddin Safdar Ali Deshmukh	Indian National Congress
1990	Suresh Navale	Shiv Sena
1995	Suresh Navale	Shiv Sena
1999	Syed Salim Ali Syed Ali	Nationalist Congress Party
2004	Sunil Dhande	Shiv Sena
2009	Jaydattaji Kshirsagar	Nationalist Congress Party
2014	Jaydattaji Kshirsagar	Nationalist Congress Party
2019	Sandeep Kshirsagar	Nationalist Congress Party
2024	Sandeep Kshirsagar	Nationalist Congress Party (SP)

== Election results ==
=== Assembly Election 2024 ===
2024 Maharashtra Legislative Assembly election : Beed
Party	Candidate	Votes	%	±%
NCP-SP	Sandeep Kshirsagar	101,874	42.08%	New
NCP	Yogesh Bharatbhushan Kshirsagar	96,550	39.88%	New
Independent	Anil Manikrao Jagtap	15,613	6.45%	New
Independent	Dr. Jyoti Vinayakrao Mete	9,768	4.03%	New
Maharashtra Swarajya Party	Haribhau Khande Kundlik	3,359	1.39%	New
VBA	Purushottam Narayanrao Veer	3,247	1.34%	▼1.19
Independent	Majahar Habib Khan	2,006	0.83%	New
NOTA	None of the Above	641	0.26%	▼0.13
Margin of victory		5,324	2.20%	▲1.30
Turnout		2,42,725	63.06%	▼2.71
Total valid votes		2,42,084		
Registered electors		3,84,885		▲14.56
NCP-SP gain from NCP		Swing	▼3.26	

=== Assembly Election 2019 ===
2019 Maharashtra Legislative Assembly election : Beed
Party	Candidate	Votes	%	±%
NCP	Sandeep Kshirsagar	99,934	45.34%	▲7.14
SS	Jaydattaji Kshirsagar	97,950	44.44%	▲29.24
AIMIM	Adv.Shaikh Shafik (Bhau)	7,957	3.61%	New
VBA	Ashok Sukhdev Hinge	5,585	2.53%	New
NOTA	None of the Above	874	0.40%	▲0.07
Margin of victory		1,984	0.90%	▼2.14
Turnout		2,21,309	65.87%	▼3.66
Total valid votes		2,20,420		
Registered electors		3,35,965		▲15.25
NCP hold		Swing	▲7.14	

=== Assembly Election 2014 ===
2014 Maharashtra Legislative Assembly election : Beed
Party	Candidate	Votes	%	±%
NCP	Jaydattaji Kshirsagar	77,134	38.20%	▼19.45
BJP	Vinayak Tukaram Mete	71,002	35.16%	New
SS	Anil Manikrao Jagtap	30,691	15.20%	▼2.36
INC	Sirajoddin Safdar Ali Deshmukh	8,790	4.35%	New
MNS	Sunil Suryabhan Dhande	2,184	1.08%	▼0.44
CPI	Namdev Fakira Chavan	1,775	0.88%	New
BSP	Chandanshiv Ashok Murlidhar	1,510	0.75%	▼0.07
NOTA	None of the Above	650	0.32%	New
Margin of victory		6,132	3.04%	▼37.06
Turnout		2,03,021	69.64%	▲2.66
Total valid votes		2,01,924		
Registered electors		2,91,514		▲2.54
NCP hold		Swing	▼19.45	

=== Assembly Election 2009 ===
2009 Maharashtra Legislative Assembly election : Beed
Party	Candidate	Votes	%	±%
NCP	Jaydattaji Kshirsagar	109,163	57.65%	▲16.86
SS	Sunil Suryabhan Dhande	33,246	17.56%	▼31.96
RPI(A)	Syed Salim Ali Syed Ali	32,999	17.43%	New
MNS	Ashok Shivaji Taware	2,886	1.52%	New
BSP	Balbhim Bapurao Borwade	1,551	0.82%	▼0.97
Independent	Shirale Navnath Motiram (Anna)	1,342	0.71%	New
Independent	Syed Saleem Syed Liyaqutali	1,176	0.62%	New
Margin of victory		75,917	40.09%	▲31.36
Turnout		1,89,358	66.60%	▼4.74
Total valid votes		1,89,356		
Registered electors		2,84,304		▲16.01
NCP gain from SS		Swing	▲8.13	

=== Assembly Election 2004 ===
2004 Maharashtra Legislative Assembly election : Beed
Party	Candidate	Votes	%	±%
SS	Sunil Suryabhan Dhande	86,581	49.52%	▲18.00
NCP	Syed Salim Ali Syed Ali	71,308	40.79%	▲6.87
Independent	Sudhakar Sahebrao Waghmare	3,814	2.18%	New
BSP	Syed Shahed Rahematulla	3,129	1.79%	New
BBM	Upre Kaka Hanumnat Rao Baburao	3,002	1.72%	New
SP	Morale Pakhare Sushila Tai	2,036	1.16%	New
CPI	Sanap Uttamrao Wamanrao	1,477	0.84%	New
Margin of victory		15,273	8.74%	▲6.34
Turnout		1,74,845	71.35%	▲9.11
Total valid votes		1,74,837		
Registered electors		2,45,060		▲15.00
SS gain from NCP		Swing	▲15.60	

=== Assembly Election 1999 ===
1999 Maharashtra Legislative Assembly election : Beed
Party	Candidate	Votes	%	±%
NCP	Syed Salim Ali Syed Ali	44,978	33.92%	New
SS	Sunil Suryabhan Dhande	41,802	31.52%	▼17.42
Independent	Prof. Suresh Niwrutirao Nawle	17,851	13.46%	New
INC	Abdul Khalek Painter	10,150	7.65%	▼22.00
Independent	Wanwe Dashrath Tulsiram	5,869	4.43%	New
PWPI	Tupe Janardhan Tatayaba	4,863	3.67%	New
Independent	Tandle Sarjerao Bhagwan	4,307	3.25%	New
Margin of victory		3,176	2.39%	▼16.89
Turnout		1,41,694	66.49%	▼4.76
Total valid votes		1,32,613		
Registered electors		2,13,093		▲3.15
NCP gain from SS		Swing	▼15.02	

=== Assembly Election 1995 ===
1995 Maharashtra Legislative Assembly election : Beed
Party	Candidate	Votes	%	±%
SS	Prof. Suresh Niwrutirao Nawle	67,732	48.94%	▲8.03
INC	Jaydattaji Kshirsagar	41,041	29.65%	▲17.13
BBM	Abdul Khalek Painter	21,065	15.22%	New
CPI	Athar Babar Ahmed Husain	3,037	2.19%	New
Independent	Syed Misbahaullah Syed Ahmed	1,006	0.73%	New
Independent	Gurav Kalyan Bhanudas	950	0.69%	New
Margin of victory		26,691	19.28%	▲6.15
Turnout		1,41,896	68.68%	▲11.16
Total valid votes		1,38,404		
Registered electors		2,06,590		▲8.11
SS hold		Swing	▲8.03	

=== Assembly Election 1990 ===
1990 Maharashtra Legislative Assembly election : Beed
Party	Candidate	Votes	%	±%
SS	Prof. Suresh Niwrutirao Nawle	43,643	40.90%	New
Independent	Rajendra Sahebrao Jagtap	29,626	27.77%	New
JD	Sushila Ganpatrao Morale	15,789	14.80%	New
INC	Md. Latif Abdul Razak	13,362	12.52%	▼22.52
Independent	Rameshwar Tulsiram Burande	1,814	1.70%	New
Independent	Jawakar Dayasagar Baburao	896	0.84%	New
Margin of victory		14,017	13.14%	▲8.52
Turnout		1,08,651	56.86%	▲8.44
Total valid votes		1,06,699		
Registered electors		1,91,093		▲29.13
SS gain from INC		Swing	▲5.86	

=== Assembly Election 1985 ===
1985 Maharashtra Legislative Assembly election : Beed
Party	Candidate	Votes	%	±%
INC	Sirajoddin Safdar Ali Deshmukh	24,581	35.05%	New
Independent	Rajendra Sahebrao Jagtap	21,342	30.43%	New
IC(S)	Machindra Baburao Maske	9,201	13.12%	New
CPI	Sushila Morale (Pakhare)	4,589	6.54%	▼1.14
Independent	Mahadeoappa Rudrappa Dhepe	3,469	4.95%	New
Independent	Mohommad Rashed Saleem Hakim Mohammad Yosuf	3,029	4.32%	New
Independent	Sopanrao Kondiberrao Tangde	2,193	3.13%	New
Margin of victory		3,239	4.62%	▲3.13
Turnout		71,641	48.41%	▲0.44
Total valid votes		70,139		
Registered electors		1,47,984		▲13.37
INC gain from INC(U)		Swing	▼5.13	

=== Assembly Election 1980 ===
1980 Maharashtra Legislative Assembly election : Beed
Party	Candidate	Votes	%	±%
INC(U)	Rajendra Sahebrao Jagtap	24,626	40.18%	New
INC(I)	Shraopatrao Limbajirao Kadam	23,715	38.69%	▲21.59
BJP	Aadinath Limbaji Nawle	5,874	9.58%	New
CPI	Shamrao Narayanrao Nagargoje	4,708	7.68%	▲3.55
Independent	Shafiyoddin Yusufoddin	751	1.23%	New
Independent	Kamble Bhanudas Pandharinath	670	1.09%	New
Independent	Singare Jagannath Waman	513	0.84%	New
Margin of victory		911	1.49%	▼18.57
Turnout		63,431	48.59%	▼6.03
Total valid votes		61,295		
Registered electors		1,30,536		▲10.39
INC(U) gain from JP		Swing	▼3.02	

=== Assembly Election 1978 ===
1978 Maharashtra Legislative Assembly election : Beed
Party	Candidate	Votes	%	±%
JP	Aadinath Limbaji Nawle	27,069	43.20%	New
INC	Kesharbai Sonajirao Kshirsagar	14,499	23.14%	New
INC(I)	S. Anisuddin Jam Mohammed	10,713	17.10%	New
Independent	Wadmare Bansidhar Balajirao	4,118	6.57%	New
PWPI	Dhepe Mahadeoappa Rudrappa	3,671	5.86%	New
CPI	Athar Babar Ahmed Husain	2,590	4.13%	New
Margin of victory		12,570	20.06%	
Turnout		64,788	54.79%	
Total valid votes		62,660		
Registered electors		1,18,254		
JP win (new seat)				

== See also ==
- Beed
- List of constituencies of Maharashtra Vidhan Sabha
