= Kaij Assembly constituency =

Constituency of the Maharashtra legislative assembly in India

Coordinates: 18.71°N 76.06°E

Kaij
- Constituency No. 232 for the Maharashtra Legislative Assembly

Constituency details
- Country: India
- Region: Western India
- State: Maharashtra
- District: Beed
- Lok Sabha constituency: Beed
- Established: 1952
- Total electors: 387,944
- Reservation: SC

Member of Legislative Assembly
- 15th Maharashtra Legislative Assembly
- Incumbent Namita Mundada
- Party: Bharatiya Janata Party
- Alliance: Maha Yuti
- Elected year: 2024

Kaij Assembly constituency is one of the 288 Vidhan Sabha (legislative assembly) constituencies of Maharashtra state in western India.

== Overview ==
Kaij (constituency number 232) is one of the six Vidhan Sabha constituencies located in the Beed district. It covers the entire Kaij tehsil and parts of the Ambajogai and Beed tehsils of this district. This constituency is reserved for the candidates belonging to the Scheduled castes

Kaij is part of the Beed Lok Sabha constituency along with all other Vidhan Sabha segments in this district, namely Parli, Majalgaon, Georai, Beed and Ashti.

== Members of the Legislative Assembly ==
Election	Member	Party
1952	Ramlingswami Mahalingswami	Indian National Congress
1957		Indian National Congress
1957	Govindrao Keroji Gaikwad	Indian National Congress
1962	Govindrao Keroji Gaikwad	Indian National Congress
1967	Sundarrao Solanke	Indian National Congress
1972	Baburao Kokate (Adaskar)	Indian National Congress
1978	Bhagoji Nivruttirao Satpute	Independent politician
1980	Gangadhar Nilkanthrao Swami	Indian National Congress (U)
1985	Bhagoji Nivruttirao Satpute	Indian Congress (Socialist)
1990	Dr. Vimal Mundada	Bharatiya Janata Party
1995	Dr. Vimal Mundada	Bharatiya Janata Party
1999	Dr. Vimal Mundada	Nationalist Congress Party
2004	Dr. Vimal Mundada	Nationalist Congress Party
2009	Dr. Vimal Mundada	Nationalist Congress Party
2012 By-election	Pruthviraj Shivaji Sathe	Nationalist Congress Party
2014	Sangeeta Thombre	Bharatiya Janata Party
2019	Namita Akshay Mundada	Bharatiya Janata Party
2024	Namita Akshay Mundada	Bharatiya Janata Party

== Election results ==
=== Assembly Election 2024 ===
2024 Maharashtra Legislative Assembly election : Kaij
Party	Candidate	Votes	%	±%
BJP	Namita Akshay Mundada	117,081	47.21%	▼6.91
NCP-SP	Pruthviraj Shivaji Sathe	114,394	46.12%	New
Bahujan Maha Party	Ashok Bhagoji Thorat	3,559	1.43%	New
Independent	Vaibhav Vivek Swami	2,007	0.81%	New
MNS	Ramesh Raghunath Galphade	1,537	0.62%	New
NOTA	None of the above	662	0.27%	▼0.43
Margin of victory		2,687	1.08%	▼13.35
Turnout		248,677	64.10%	▲0.72
Total valid votes		248,015		
Registered electors		387,944		▲7.04
BJP hold		Swing	▼6.91	

=== Assembly Election 2019 ===
2019 Maharashtra Legislative Assembly election : Kaij
Party	Candidate	Votes	%	±%
BJP	Namita Akshay Mundada	123,433	54.12%	▲4.14
NCP	Pruthviraj Shivaji Sathe	90,524	39.69%	▲9.69
VBA	Vaibhav Vivek Swami	9,156	4.01%	New
NOTA	None of the above	1,598	0.70%	▲0.10
Margin of victory		32,909	14.43%	▼5.56
Turnout		229,692	63.38%	▼3.10
Total valid votes		228,075		
Registered electors		362,430		▲11.97
BJP hold		Swing	▲4.14	

=== Assembly Election 2014 ===
2014 Maharashtra Legislative Assembly election : Kaij
Party	Candidate	Votes	%	±%
BJP	Sangeeta Thombre	106,834	49.98%	▲6.94
NCP	Namita Akshay Mundada	64,113	30.00%	▼17.65
INC	Anjali Ram Ghadge	23,011	10.77%	New
SS	Kalpana Ramesh Narhire	8,466	3.96%	New
BSP	Manik Bansi Admane	2,223	1.04%	New
PWPI	Dr. Ingole Rajesh Madhukarrao	1,617	0.76%	New
Independent	Hajare Radhesh Goroba	1,550	0.73%	New
NOTA	None of the above	1,290	0.60%	New
Margin of victory		42,721	19.99%	▲15.37
Turnout		215,165	66.48%	▲7.86
Total valid votes		213,738		
Registered electors		323,675		▲5.44
BJP gain from NCP		Swing	▲2.33	

=== Assembly By-election 2012 ===
2012 Maharashtra Legislative Assembly by-election : Kaij
Party	Candidate	Votes	%	±%
NCP	Pruthviraj Shivaji Sathe	85,750	47.65%	▼10.06
BJP	Sangeeta Thombre	77,444	43.04%	▲8.46
SP	S. D. Kamble	2,281	1.27%	New
Independent	S. R. Baliram	1,880	1.04%	New
Independent	S. A. Sopan	1,742	0.97%	New
Independent	S. G. Baliram	1,738	0.97%	New
Independent	S. U. Tulshiram	1,721	0.96%	New
Independent	A. B. Thorat	1,164	0.65%	New
Margin of victory		8,306	4.62%	▼18.51
Turnout		179,952	58.62%	▼5.88
Total valid votes		179,952		
Registered electors		306,962		▲3.44
NCP hold		Swing	▼10.06	

=== Assembly Election 2009 ===
2009 Maharashtra Legislative Assembly election : Kaij
Party	Candidate	Votes	%	±%
NCP	Dr. Vimal Mundada	110,452	57.71%	▲2.98
BJP	Netke Venkatrao Ramrao	66,188	34.58%	▼2.90
BSP	Wede Vijaykumar Rajaram	3,917	2.05%	▼0.64
Independent	Jagatkar Anant Shankarrao	3,099	1.62%	New
Independent	Hajare Radhesh Goroba	1,607	0.84%	New
Independent	Tangade Balasaheb Sitaram	1,161	0.61%	New
Margin of victory		44,264	23.13%	▲5.87
Turnout		191,405	64.50%	▼6.47
Total valid votes		191,392		
Registered electors		296,749		▲32.92
NCP hold		Swing	▲2.98	

=== Assembly Election 2004 ===
2004 Maharashtra Legislative Assembly election : Kaij
Party	Candidate	Votes	%	±%
NCP	Dr. Vimal Mundada	86,720	54.73%	▼10.09
BJP	Wadmare Chandrashekhar Vishnupant	59,380	37.48%	▲9.18
BSP	Kamble Dnyaneshwar (Dnyanoba) Laxmanrao	4,256	2.69%	New
SP	Ghadge Ram Ganpatrao	2,785	1.76%	New
RSPS	Sawalkar Sambhaji Jyotiba	2,682	1.69%	New
Independent	Hajare Radhesh Goroba	1,628	1.03%	New
Prabuddha Republican Party	Srilatari Mahendra Nikalje	989	0.62%	New
Margin of victory		27,340	17.26%	▼19.26
Turnout		158,441	70.97%	▲0.95
Total valid votes		158,440		
Registered electors		223,252		▲16.95
NCP hold		Swing	▼10.09	

=== Assembly Election 1999 ===
1999 Maharashtra Legislative Assembly election : Kaij
Party	Candidate	Votes	%	±%
NCP	Dr. Vimal Mundada	81,354	64.82%	New
BJP	Shetty Devendra Purshottam	35,519	28.30%	▼27.63
BBM	Wede Lankesh Govindrao	5,710	4.55%	New
ABS	Ganachari Sambhuling Shivling	1,598	1.27%	New
Independent	Bansode Ashok Ganpati	898	0.72%	New
Margin of victory		45,835	36.52%	▲5.32
Turnout		133,662	70.02%	▲0.80
Total valid votes		125,505		
Registered electors		190,893		▼0.64
NCP gain from BJP		Swing	▲8.89	

=== Assembly Election 1995 ===
1995 Maharashtra Legislative Assembly election : Kaij
Party	Candidate	Votes	%	±%
BJP	Dr. Vimal Mundada	72,308	55.93%	▲20.21
INC	Satpute Bhagoji Nivruttirao	31,978	24.74%	▼1.82
BBM	Jogdand Shripatrao Kisan	6,553	5.07%	New
Independent	Wadmare Chandrashekhar Vishnupant	5,977	4.62%	New
JD	Ghadge Shivaji Shankar	2,252	1.74%	▼2.09
Independent	Chavan Ashok Suryabhan	1,960	1.52%	New
CPI(M)	Sarwade Babasaheb Bhaguji	1,551	1.20%	New
BSP	Jogdand Bansi Nagu	1,042	0.81%	New
Margin of victory		40,330	31.20%	▲22.04
Turnout		132,982	69.22%	▲15.91
Total valid votes		129,281		
Registered electors		192,114		▼0.54
BJP hold		Swing	▲20.21	

=== Assembly Election 1990 ===
1990 Maharashtra Legislative Assembly election : Kaij
Party	Candidate	Votes	%	±%
BJP	Dr. Vimal Mundada	35,957	35.72%	New
INC	Bhaguji Niwarti Satpute	26,736	26.56%	▼10.19
Independent	Mangesh Pralhadrao Ranjankar	15,260	15.16%	New
BRP	Jogdand Shripati Kishanrao	12,365	12.28%	New
JD	Jogdand Bansi Nagu	3,857	3.83%	New
Akhil Bhartiya Maratha Mahasangh	Kamble Dyanoba Laxman	1,418	1.41%	New
INS(SCS)	Ere Maruti Nivrati	1,293	1.28%	New
Independent	Ghadge Ram Ganpatrao	847	0.84%	New
Margin of victory		9,221	9.16%	▼4.37
Turnout		102,962	53.31%	▲7.67
Total valid votes		100,668		
Registered electors		193,153		▲31.47
BJP gain from IC(S)		Swing	▼14.57	

=== Assembly Election 1985 ===
1985 Maharashtra Legislative Assembly election : Kaij
Party	Candidate	Votes	%	±%
IC(S)	Satpute Bhagoji Nivruttirao	32,967	50.29%	New
INC	Jagatkar Anant Shankarrao	24,096	36.75%	New
Independent	Ghadge Ram Ganpatrao	2,576	3.93%	New
RPI	Hajare (Guruji) Rambhau Vitihalrao	1,867	2.85%	New
Independent	Parve (Pardhi) Vithal Piraji	1,262	1.92%	New
Independent	Swami Yogiraj Swami Manmath	944	1.44%	New
Independent	Ingle Dnyanoba Vyankoba	658	1.00%	New
Independent	Jogdand Sambajirao Satwajjirao	550	0.84%	New
Margin of victory		8,871	13.53%	▼28.33
Turnout		67,051	45.64%	▲3.60
Total valid votes		65,559		
Registered electors		146,920		▲5.54
IC(S) gain from INC(U)		Swing	▼4.12	

=== Assembly Election 1980 ===
1980 Maharashtra Legislative Assembly election : Kaij
Party	Candidate	Votes	%	±%
INC(U)	Gangadhar Nilkanth Swami	30,937	54.41%	New
INC(I)	Veena Bansilal Khare	7,137	12.55%	New
Independent	Bhagojirao Nivrtirao Satpute	5,344	9.40%	New
[[Janata Party (Secular) Charan Singh|Janata Party (Secular) Charan Singh]]	Jogdand Shripatrao Kisan	4,646	8.17%	New
Independent	Jogdand Sambajirao Satwajjirao	3,229	5.68%	New
JP	Swami Yogiraj Manmath	1,446	2.54%	New
RPI(K)	Hazare Rambhu Vithalrao	1,278	2.25%	▼11.07
Independent	Maske Laxmibai Baburao	1,261	2.22%	New
Margin of victory		23,800	41.86%	▲29.60
Turnout		58,525	42.04%	▲1.67
Total valid votes		56,860		
Registered electors		139,206		▲13.95
INC(U) gain from Independent		Swing	▲14.63	

=== Assembly Election 1978 ===
1978 Maharashtra Legislative Assembly election : Kaij
Party	Candidate	Votes	%	±%
Independent	Satpute Bhagoji Nivruttirao	19,010	39.78%	New
Independent	Thorat Shanrao Laxmanrao	13,154	27.53%	New
RPI(K)	Hazare Rambhu Vithalrao	6,363	13.32%	New
RPI	S. T. Pradhan	4,819	10.08%	New
Independent	Jogdand Sambajirao Satwajjirao	1,975	4.13%	New
Independent	Sasane Bhagwan Gundaji	1,164	2.44%	New
Independent	Tangde Sopan Kondibarao	657	1.37%	New
Independent	Sarvade Namdeo Waman	394	0.82%	New
Margin of victory		5,856	12.26%	▼22.93
Turnout		49,321	40.37%	▼22.99
Total valid votes		47,784		
Registered electors		122,166		▲31.02
Independent gain from INC		Swing	▼27.81	

=== Assembly Election 1972 ===
1972 Maharashtra Legislative Assembly election : Kaij
Party	Candidate	Votes	%	±%
INC	Babu Rao Adaskar	38,416	67.59%	▲18.82
SSP	Bapu Kaldate	18,417	32.41%	New
Margin of victory		19,999	35.19%	▲28.15
Turnout		59,078	63.36%	▲8.41
Total valid votes		56,833		
Registered electors		93,240		▲17.09
INC hold		Swing	▲18.82	

=== Assembly Election 1967 ===
1967 Maharashtra Legislative Assembly election : Kaij
Party	Candidate	Votes	%	±%
INC	Sundarrao Solanke	19,521	48.77%	▼11.43
CPI(M)	G. M. Burrande	16,703	41.73%	New
ABJS	M. V. Kakde	2,554	6.38%	New
Independent	K. M. Jamaluddin	1,247	3.12%	New
Margin of victory		2,818	7.04%	▼31.96
Turnout		43,755	54.95%	▲23.54
Total valid votes		40,025		
Registered electors		79,629		▲18.58
INC hold		Swing	▼11.43	

=== Assembly Election 1962 ===
1962 Maharashtra Legislative Assembly election : Kaij
Party	Candidate	Votes	%	±%
INC	Govind Rao Gaikwad	11,843	60.20%	▲11.32
RPI	Babu Rao Abarao	4,171	21.20%	New
Independent	Rambhau Vithal	2,556	12.99%	New
Independent	Shelar Sukhdeo	1,104	5.61%	New
Margin of victory		7,672	39.00%	▲36.70
Turnout		21,090	31.41%	▼38.98
Total valid votes		19,674		
Registered electors		67,150		▼44.86
INC hold		Swing	▲35.36	

=== Assembly Election 1957 ===
1957 Bombay State Legislative Assembly election : Kaij
Party	Candidate	Votes	%	±%
INC	Ramlingswami Mahalingswami	21,294	24.84%	▼12.99
INC	Gaikwad Govindrao Keroji	20,603	24.03%	▼13.80
PSP	Wamanrao S/o Ramrao Deshmukh	19,326	22.54%	New
SCF	Maske Babu S/o Abarao	17,392	20.29%	New
Independent	Zahir Ahmed S/o Bashir Ahmed	7,107	8.29%	New
Margin of victory		1,968	2.30%	▼2.07
Turnout		85,722	70.39%	▲27.93
Total valid votes		85,722		
Registered electors		121,785		▲124.90
INC hold		Swing	▼12.99	

=== Assembly Election 1952 ===
1952 Hyderabad State Legislative Assembly election : Kaij
Party	Candidate	Votes	%	±%
INC	Ramlingswami Mahalingswami	8,698	37.83%	New
PDF	Kashinath Sitaram	7,694	33.46%	New
PWPI	Tulsiramji	6,602	28.71%	New
Margin of victory		1,004	4.37%	
Turnout		22,994	42.46%	
Total valid votes		22,994		
Registered electors		54,151		
INC win (new seat)				
