= Jaydattaji Kshirsagar =

Indian politician (born 1950)

Jaydatt Sonajirao Kshirsagar

Member of Legislative Assembly of Maharashtra
- In office 2009–2019
- Preceded by: Sunil Suryabhan Dhande
- Succeeded by: Sandeep Kshirsagar
- Constituency: Beed

Member of Legislative Assembly of Maharashtra
- In office 1999–2004
- Preceded by: Bhai Tupe Janardhan Tatyaba
- Succeeded by: Andhale Keshavrao Yadavrao
- Constituency: Chausala
- In office 1990–1995
- Preceded by: Ashokrao Shankarrao Patil
- Succeeded by: Bhai Tupe Janardhan Tatyaba
- Constituency: Chausala

Minister of Public Works Department Government of Maharashtra
- In office October 2009 – August 2014

Minister of Employment Guarantee & Horticulture Government of Maharashtra
- In office 9 June 2019 – 8 November 2019
- Preceded by: Girish Bapat
- Succeeded by: Subhash Desai

Personal details
- Born: 7 December 1950 (age 75) At.Rajuri (Navgan), Tq.Dist.Beed District
- Other political affiliations: Indian National Congress Nationalist Congress Party
- Relations: Kesharbai Kshirsagar (Mother) Sandeep Kshirsagar (Nephew) Bharatbhushan Kshirsagar (Brother)

Jaydattaji Sonajirao Kshirsagar is a leader of Shiv Sena from Beed district, Marathwada. He is a past Member of the Legislative Assembly of Maharashtra for Beed, and a former minister of Maharashtra.

== Positions held ==
- 1990: Elected to Maharashtra Legislative Assembly
- 1999: Elected to Maharashtra Legislative Assembly
- 2009: Elected to Maharashtra Legislative Assembly
- 2009: Appointed Minister of Public Works Department in Maharashtra Government
- 2014: Re-Elected to Maharashtra Legislative Assembly
- 2019: Minister of Employment Guarantee and Horticulture in Maharashtra State Government

== See also ==
- Devendra Fadnavis ministry
