= Pritam Munde =

Indian politician (born 1983)

Pritam Gopinath Munde

Member of Parliament, Lok Sabha
- In office 16 September 2014 – 4 June 2024
- Preceded by: Gopinath Munde
- Succeeded by: Bajrang Manohar Sonwane
- Constituency: Beed, Maharashtra

Personal details
- Born: 17 February 1983 (age 43) Beed, Maharashtra, India
- Party: Bharatiya Janata Party
- Spouse: Gaurav Khade (m. 2009)
- Relations: Pankaja Munde (sister)
- Children: 1
- Parent: Gopinath Munde (father)
- Education: D. Y. Patil Medical College
- Profession: Medical (Dermatologist) Practitioner; politician

Pritam Gopinathrao Munde aka "Pritam Tai" (born 17 February 1983) is an Indian politician and doctor who was previously a member of parliament in Lok Sabha from Beed. She is the second daughter of late BJP leader Gopinath Munde. In the 2019 Lok Sabha elections, she emerged as a victorious candidate by defeating Bajrang Manohar Sonwane of Nationalist Congress Party by a margin of 1.68 lakh votes. However, her sister Pankaja Munde stood for that seat in the 2024 Lok Sabha elections and lost to Sonwane.

== Early life ==
Pritam was born on 17 February 1983 to Central Cabinet Minister & former dy.CM of Maharashtra Gopinath Munde and Pradnya Munde. She has one elder sister Pankaja Munde and a younger sister Yashashari. She is a niece of Pramod Mahajan, and a cousin to Rahul Mahajan and Poonam Mahajan. NCP leader Dhananjay Munde is also her cousin.

She married Gaurav Khade in 2009 and they have a son named Agastya Khade. She is a political figure belonging to the dominant Vanjari community and has held significant roles in Bharatiya Janata Party.
