= Renapur Assembly constituency =

Constituency of the Maharashtra legislative assembly in India

Coordinates: 18.53°N 76.60°E

Renapur
- Former constituency for the Maharashtra Legislative Assembly

Constituency details
- Country: India
- Region: Western India
- State: Maharashtra
- Established: 1957
- Abolished: 2008

Renapur was one of the 288 seats in the Maharashtra assembly in India until it was disestablished in 2008, when the redrawing of the political map by the delimitation made the seat defunct. It was a high-profile seat because Gopinath Munde used to contest from here.

== Members of the Legislative Assembly ==
Year	Member	Party
1957	Chandhari Gungadherappa S/O Chanbusappa	Indian National Congress
1962	Ganpathi Anna Gite	Communist Party of India
1967	Ganpathi Anna Gite	Indian National Congress
1972	Raghunathrao Munde	Indian National Congress
1978	Raghunathrao Munde	Indian National Congress
1980	Gopinath Pandurang Munde	Bharatiya Janata Party
1985	Panditrao Narayanrao Dound	Indian National Congress
1990	Gopinath Pandurang Munde	Bharatiya Janata Party
1995	Gopinath Pandurang Munde	Bharatiya Janata Party
1999	Gopinath Pandurang Munde	Bharatiya Janata Party
2004	Gopinath Pandurang Munde	Bharatiya Janata Party

== Election results ==
=== Assembly Election 2004 ===
2004 Maharashtra Legislative Assembly election : Renapur
Party	Candidate	Votes	%	±%
BJP	Gopinath Pandurang Munde	92,745	56.56%	▲6.26
NCP	Fulchand Yedba Karad	54,312	33.12%	▲4.99
SP	Munde Trimbak Patloba	8,760	5.34%	New
Independent	Gangadhar Baliram Rode	2,521	1.54%	New
BSP	Sayyed Murtuza Sayyed Osman	2,032	1.24%	New
RSPS	Somawanshi Nandkishor Laxmanrao	1,691	1.03%	New
Margin of victory		38,433	23.44%	▲1.27
Turnout		1,63,992	73.72%	▲1.21
Total valid votes		1,63,977		
Registered electors		2,22,441		▲11.99
BJP hold		Swing	▲6.26	

=== Assembly Election 1999 ===
1999 Maharashtra Legislative Assembly election : Renapur
Party	Candidate	Votes	%	±%
BJP	Gopinath Pandurang Munde	70,187	50.30%	▼4.28
NCP	Munde Trimbak Patloba	39,254	28.13%	New
INC	Daund Panditrao Narayan	28,901	20.71%	▼14.03
Margin of victory		30,933	22.17%	▲2.32
Turnout		1,44,035	72.52%	▼2.42
Total valid votes		1,39,534		
Registered electors		1,98,619		▲4.15
BJP hold		Swing	▼4.28	

=== Assembly Election 1995 ===
1995 Maharashtra Legislative Assembly election : Renapur
Party	Candidate	Votes	%	±%
BJP	Gopinath Pandurang Munde	78,006	54.58%	▲5.59
INC	Kokate Baburao Narsingrao	49,647	34.74%	▼9.38
BBM	Done Manchak Baliram	4,530	3.17%	New
JD	Akangire Vimalbaikrishnath	3,186	2.23%	▼0.42
Independent	Waghmare Sandipan Shrirang	938	0.66%	New
Margin of victory		28,359	19.84%	▲14.98
Turnout		1,45,708	76.41%	▲10.83
Total valid votes		1,42,910		
Registered electors		1,90,698		▼0.63
BJP hold		Swing	▲5.59	

=== Assembly Election 1990 ===
1990 Maharashtra Legislative Assembly election : Renapur
Party	Candidate	Votes	%	±%
BJP	Gopinath Pandurang Munde	60,275	48.99%	▲11.06
INC	Daund Panditrao Narayan	54,285	44.12%	▲3.15
JD	More Shrirangrao Niwartirao	3,258	2.65%	New
Akhil Bhartiya Maratha Mahasangh	Kale Raosaheb Tatyaba	2,237	1.82%	New
Margin of victory		5,990	4.87%	▲1.83
Turnout		1,24,897	65.08%	▲3.48
Total valid votes		1,23,026		
Registered electors		1,91,902		▲33.47
BJP gain from INC		Swing	▲8.02	

=== Assembly Election 1985 ===
1985 Maharashtra Legislative Assembly election : Renapur
Party	Candidate	Votes	%	±%
INC	Dound Panditrao Narayanrao	35,718	40.97%	New
BJP	Gopinath Pandurang Munde	33,067	37.93%	▼7.20
Independent	Akangire Sham Pralhadrao	10,573	12.13%	New
Independent	Anna Ganpathi Gite	3,342	3.83%	New
CPI(M)	Burande Gangadharappa	3,285	3.77%	New
Independent	Wahire Rajendra Sadashivrao	599	0.69%	New
Margin of victory		2,651	3.04%	▼3.04
Turnout		89,121	61.98%	▼4.34
Total valid votes		87,174		
Registered electors		1,43,784		▲9.68
INC gain from BJP		Swing	▼4.16	

=== Assembly Election 1980 ===
1980 Maharashtra Legislative Assembly election : Renapur
Party	Candidate	Votes	%	±%
BJP	Gopinath Pandurang Munde	38,443	45.14%	New
INC(I)	Kokate Baburao Narsinghrao Adaskar	33,267	39.06%	New
Independent	D. N. Patil	7,795	9.15%	New
PWPI	Chewale Santram Sambhaji	3,066	3.60%	New
Independent	Sonwane Sriram Madhavrao	668	0.78%	New
Independent	Jogdand Irrada Piraji	664	0.78%	New
Independent	Darade Kalidas Aba	582	0.68%	New
Margin of victory		5,176	6.08%	▲0.79
Turnout		87,123	66.46%	▲0.57
Total valid votes		85,173		
Registered electors		1,31,093		▲12.08
BJP gain from INC		Swing	▼3.28	

=== Assembly Election 1978 ===
1978 Maharashtra Legislative Assembly election : Renapur
Party	Candidate	Votes	%	±%
INC	Raghunathrao Munde	36,468	48.41%	▼7.34
JP	Gopinath Pandurang Munde	32,485	43.12%	New
Independent	Bhosle Vaijnath Govind	2,749	3.65%	New
Independent	Pathan Shah Mohmad Dost Mohmad	1,411	1.87%	New
Independent	Ogale Vasant Vishwanath	1,248	1.66%	New
Independent	Wavhale Santram Ganpat	968	1.29%	New
Margin of victory		3,983	5.29%	▼19.04
Turnout		77,853	66.56%	▲10.32
Total valid votes		75,329		
Registered electors		1,16,967		▲18.64
INC hold		Swing	▼7.34	

=== Assembly Election 1972 ===
1972 Maharashtra Legislative Assembly election : Renapur
Party	Candidate	Votes	%	±%
INC	Raghunathrao Munde	29,727	55.75%	▲5.04
PWPI	Chewle Santram Sambhaji	16,752	31.42%	▼1.24
RPI	Jogdand Sambhaji Sajvaji	3,367	6.31%	New
Independent	Naranne	2,039	3.82%	New
ABJS	Munde Ganpati Shripati	1,439	2.70%	▲0.90
Margin of victory		12,975	24.33%	▲6.28
Turnout		55,351	56.14%	▲5.71
Total valid votes		53,324		
Registered electors		98,593		▲20.63
INC hold		Swing	▲5.04	

=== Assembly Election 1967 ===
1967 Maharashtra Legislative Assembly election : Renapur
Party	Candidate	Votes	%	±%
INC	Anna Ganpathi Gite	20,051	50.71%	▲9.31
PWPI	A. N. Chavan	12,911	32.65%	New
Independent	B. Kushaba	3,182	8.05%	New
Independent	R. S. Gitte	2,684	6.79%	New
ABJS	S. G. Vavhale	713	1.80%	New
Margin of victory		7,140	18.06%	▲0.86
Turnout		42,942	52.54%	▲2.51
Total valid votes		39,541		
Registered electors		81,732		▲16.99
INC gain from CPI		Swing	▼7.89	

=== Assembly Election 1962 ===
1962 Maharashtra Legislative Assembly election : Renapur
Party	Candidate	Votes	%	±%
CPI	Ganpathi Anna	18,779	58.60%	▲10.32
INC	Wamanrao Deshmukh	13,269	41.40%	▼10.32
Margin of victory		5,510	17.19%	▲13.75
Turnout		34,451	49.31%	▲5.28
Total valid votes		32,048		
Registered electors		69,862		▲19.82
CPI gain from INC		Swing	▲6.87	

=== Assembly Election 1957 ===
1957 Bombay State Legislative Assembly election : Renapur
Party	Candidate	Votes	%	±%
INC	Chandhari Gungadherappa S/O Chanbusappa	12,242	51.72%	New
CPI	Anna Ganpathi Gite	11,427	48.28%	New
Margin of victory		815	3.44%	
Turnout		23,669	40.60%	
Total valid votes		23,669		
Registered electors		58,305		
INC win (new seat)				
