= Jaisingrao Gaikwad Patil =

Indian politician

Jaysingrao Gaikwad Patil

Member of Parliament
- In office 1998-2009
- Preceded by: Rajani Ashokrao Patil
- Succeeded by: Gopinath Munde
- Constituency: Beed

Personal details
- Born: 1 November 1949 (age 76) kille Dharur, Maharashtra
- Party: Nationalist Congress Party(2004-Present) Bhartiya Janata Party (1998-2004)
- Spouse: Jayshree Jaysingrao Gaikwad Patil
- Children: 2 sons and 2 daughters

Jaysingrao Gaikwad Patil (born 1 November 1949 in Kille Dharur in Beed district of Maharashtra) represented the Beed constituency of Maharashtra two times as member of Bharatiya Janata Party and later as member of the Nationalist Congress Party (NCP). He didn't contest the 15th Lok Sabha election. He again joined Nationalist Congress Party on 24 Nov 2020
