= Balasaheb Ajabe =

Indian politician

Member of Maharashtra Legislative Assembly
- In office 2019–2024
- Preceded by: Bhimrao Dhonde
- Succeeded by: Suresh Dhas
- Constituency: Ashti

Personal details
- Party: Nationalist Congress Party
- Occupation: Politician

Balasaheb Ajabe is an Indian politician, a member of Nationalist Congress Party and a member of the Maharashtra Legislative Assembly elected from Ashti Assembly constituency in Beed city. He was Elected member of the Maharashtra Legislative Assembly in 2019.

Balasaheb Ajabe lost in 2024 Maharashtra Assembly Elections.
