= Ashti Assembly constituency =

Constituency of the Maharashtra legislative assembly in India

Coordinates: 18°48′21.8″N 75°10′36.36″E

Ashti
- Constituency No. 231 for the Maharashtra Legislative Assembly

Constituency details
- Country: India
- Region: Western India
- State: Maharashtra
- District: Beed
- Lok Sabha constituency: Beed
- Established: 1952
- Total electors: 388,216
- Reservation: None

Member of Legislative Assembly
- 15th Maharashtra Legislative Assembly
- Incumbent Suresh Dhas
- Party: Bharatiya Janata Party
- Elected year: 2024

Ashti Assembly constituency is one of the 288 Vidhan Sabha (legislative assembly) constituencies of Maharashtra state in western India.

== Overview ==
Ashti (constituency number 231) is one of the six Vidhan Sabha constituencies located in Beed district. It covers the entire Ashti and Patoda tehsils and part of the Shirur tehsil of this district.

Ashti is part of the Beed Lok Sabha constituency along with all other Vidhan Sabha segments in this district, namely Parli, Majalgaon, Georai, Beed and Kaij.

== Members of Vidhan Sabha ==
Year	Member	Party
1952	Rakhamaji Dhondiba Patil	Indian National Congress
1957	Vishwanath Dagduji Ajabe	Indian National Congress
1962	Bhausaheb Kashinath Ajabe	Indian National Congress
1962	Ramdas Gangaramji Sonone	Indian National Congress
1967	Nivruti V. Ugale	Communist Party of India
1972	Sripatrao Kadam	Indian National Congress
1978	Laxmanrao Vithoba Jadhav	Indian National Congress
1980	Bhimrao Anandrao Dhonde	Independent
1985	Bhimrao Anandrao Dhonde	Indian National Congress
1990	Bhimrao Anandrao Dhonde	Indian National Congress
1995	Sahebrao Darekar	Independent
1999	Suresh Dhas	Bharatiya Janata Party
2004	Suresh Dhas	Bharatiya Janata Party
2009	Suresh Dhas	Nationalist Congress Party
2014	Bhimrao Anandrao Dhonde	Bharatiya Janata Party
2019	Balasaheb Ajabe	Nationalist Congress Party
2024	Suresh Dhas	Bharatiya Janata Party

== Election results ==
=== Assembly Election 2024 ===
2024 Maharashtra Legislative Assembly election : Ashti
Party	Candidate	Votes	%	±%
BJP	Suresh Dhas	140,507	49.09	▲6.72
Independent	Bhimrao Anandrao Dhonde	62,532	21.85	New
NCP-SP	Mahebub Ibrahim Shekh	52,738	18.42	New
NCP	Balasaheb Ajabe	21,598	7.55	New
RMP	Akshay Sadashiv Adhav	3,760	1.31	New
NOTA	None of the above	547	0.19	▼0.91
Margin of victory		77,975	27.24	▲16.40
Turnout		286,784	73.87	▲9.18
Total valid votes		286,237		
Registered electors		388,216		▲4.27
BJP gain from NCP		Swing	▼4.12	

=== Assembly Election 2019 ===
2019 Maharashtra Legislative Assembly election : Ashti
Party	Candidate	Votes	%	±%
NCP	Balasaheb Ajabe	126,756	53.21	▲7.12
BJP	Bhimrao Anandrao Dhonde	100,931	42.37	▼6.12
VBA	Namdev Sugriv Sanap	4,729	1.99	New
NOTA	None of the above	2,631	1.10	▲0.65
Margin of victory		25,825	10.84	▲8.44
Turnout		240,854	64.69	▼8.68
Total valid votes		238,207		
Registered electors		372,321		▲8.96
NCP gain from BJP		Swing	▲4.72	

=== Assembly Election 2014 ===
2014 Maharashtra Legislative Assembly election : Ashti
Party	Candidate	Votes	%	±%
BJP	Bhimrao Anandrao Dhonde	120,915	48.49	▲9.41
NCP	Suresh Dhas	114,933	46.09	▼9.10
INC	Minakshi Vinayak Pandule Pa.	3,356	1.35	New
SS	Ashok Ramkisan Dahiphale	2,798	1.12	New
NOTA	None of the above	1,124	0.45	New
Margin of victory		5,982	2.40	▼13.71
Turnout		250,713	73.37	▲4.09
Total valid votes		249,378		
Registered electors		341,703		▲9.91
BJP gain from NCP		Swing	▼6.70	

=== Assembly Election 2009 ===
2009 Maharashtra Legislative Assembly election : Ashti
Party	Candidate	Votes	%	±%
NCP	Suresh Dhas	118,847	55.19	New
BJP	Balasaheb Ajabe	84,157	39.08	▼12.99
RSPS	Doke Haridas (Bapusaheb) Shantaram	3,289	1.53	New
BSP	Vishnu Jijaba Gadekar	2,369	1.10	▲0.14
JSS	Kedar Balasaheb Bhagwanrao	2,313	1.07	New
Independent	Tukaram Nana Kale	2,295	1.07	New
MNS	Wanve Govind Sahebrao	2,054	0.95	New
Margin of victory		34,690	16.11	▼12.89
Turnout		215,383	69.28	▼8.07
Total valid votes		215,324		
Registered electors		310,902		▲35.05
NCP gain from BJP		Swing	▲3.12	

=== Assembly Election 2004 ===
2004 Maharashtra Legislative Assembly election : Ashti
Party	Candidate	Votes	%	±%
BJP	Suresh Dhas	92,706	52.07	▲6.23
Independent	Bhimrao Anandrao Dhonde	41,085	23.08	New
INC	Bangar Ramkrishna Marotirao	18,940	10.64	▼17.50
Independent	Darekar Raju Sahebrao	14,580	8.19	New
Independent	Modve Dattajirao Babasaheb	4,045	2.27	New
BSP	Pote Vishnu Ashruba	1,701	0.96	New
Independent	Pathan Muibinkhan Daud Khan	1,611	0.90	New
BBM	Nikalje Valmik Sajan	1,178	0.66	New
Margin of victory		51,621	29.00	▲11.30
Turnout		178,084	77.35	▲2.18
Total valid votes		178,026		
Registered electors		230,221		▲16.84
BJP hold		Swing	▲6.23	

=== Assembly Election 1999 ===
1999 Maharashtra Legislative Assembly election : Ashti
Party	Candidate	Votes	%	±%
BJP	Suresh Dhas	64,558	45.84	New
INC	Bhimrao Anandrao Dhonde	39,626	28.14	▲3.00
NCP	Darekar Sahebrao Nathuji	33,136	23.53	New
CPI(M)	Pokle Nanasaheb Sawleram	1,264	0.90	New
Independent	Jadhav Laxmanrao Sahebrao	1,161	0.82	New
Independent	Dhonde Sominath Janardan	846	0.60	New
Margin of victory		24,932	17.70	▼12.70
Turnout		148,114	75.17	▲3.33
Total valid votes		140,835		
Registered electors		197,045		▲1.46
BJP gain from Independent		Swing	▼9.70	

=== Assembly Election 1995 ===
1995 Maharashtra Legislative Assembly election : Ashti
Party	Candidate	Votes	%	±%
Independent	Darekar Sahebrao Nathuji	75,788	55.54	New
INC	Bhimrao Anandrao Dhonde	34,309	25.14	▼14.83
SP	Bangar Ramkrishna Marotirao	12,827	9.40	New
SS	Khade Remesh Bhivrao	6,460	4.73	▼6.90
Independent	Darekar Sampat Laxman	1,454	1.07	New
JD	Jadhav Ranjitrao Govindrao	1,039	0.76	▼37.30
Margin of victory		41,479	30.40	▲28.48
Turnout		139,530	71.84	▲10.69
Total valid votes		136,466		
Registered electors		194,210		▲5.65
Independent gain from INC		Swing	▲15.57	

=== Assembly Election 1990 ===
1990 Maharashtra Legislative Assembly election : Ashti
Party	Candidate	Votes	%	±%
INC	Bhimrao Anandrao Dhonde	44,072	39.97	▼16.79
JD	Darekar Sahebrao Nathuji	41,958	38.06	New
SS	Hambarde Chandrakant Rangnath	12,821	11.63	New
Independent	Modve Dattajirao Babasaheb	2,865	2.60	New
Independent	Kale Bhimrao Dashrathrao	1,674	1.52	New
Independent	Kakasaheb Nikantharao Ghumare	1,605	1.46	New
Independent	Babanganpatrao Jawale	1,530	1.39	New
Independent	Vaidya Sudhir Dattatrey	1,360	1.23	New
Margin of victory		2,114	1.92	▼19.54
Turnout		112,413	61.15	▲13.08
Total valid votes		110,256		
Registered electors		183,822		▲20.00
INC hold		Swing	▼16.79	

=== Assembly Election 1985 ===
1985 Maharashtra Legislative Assembly election : Ashti
Party	Candidate	Votes	%	±%
INC	Bhimrao Anandrao Dhonde	40,814	56.76	New
IC(S)	Kranti Sudhakarrao Choudhari	25,380	35.30	New
CPI	Pawar Tukaram Khandu	3,356	4.67	New
Independent	Lalman Dhariya	1,222	1.70	New
Independent	Satpute Ratan Haribhau	612	0.85	New
Independent	Pokkale Dhanji Sadu	522	0.73	New
Margin of victory		15,434	21.46	▼1.12
Turnout		73,634	48.07	▼4.66
Total valid votes		71,906		
Registered electors		153,182		▲9.82
INC gain from Independent		Swing	▲6.25	

=== Assembly Election 1980 ===
1980 Maharashtra Legislative Assembly election : Ashti
Party	Candidate	Votes	%	±%
Independent	Bhimrao Anandrao Dhonde	36,070	50.51	New
INC(I)	Ajabe Chandrakant Bhausaheb	19,946	27.93	New
INC(U)	Ugla Novrti Vithalrao	13,715	19.20	New
Independent	Kazi Hamidoddin Kazi Muniroddin	1,685	2.36	New
Margin of victory		16,124	22.58	▲19.22
Turnout		73,548	52.73	▼6.43
Total valid votes		71,416		
Registered electors		139,480		▲9.55
Independent gain from INC		Swing	▲22.96	

=== Assembly Election 1978 ===
1978 Maharashtra Legislative Assembly election : Ashti
Party	Candidate	Votes	%	±%
INC	Jadhav Laxmanrao Vithoba	20,135	27.55	▼28.97
JP	Jagtap Asrajirao Raoji	17,677	24.19	New
Independent	Bhimrao Anandrao Dhonde	16,980	23.23	New
Independent	Shekade Harishchandra Mahsuji	13,018	17.81	New
Independent	Rajguru Dadabhau Sadhu	5,276	7.22	New
Margin of victory		2,458	3.36	▼21.84
Turnout		75,318	59.16	▲6.55
Total valid votes		73,086		
Registered electors		127,323		▲24.86
INC hold		Swing	▼28.97	

=== Assembly Election 1972 ===
1972 Maharashtra Legislative Assembly election : Ashti
Party	Candidate	Votes	%	±%
INC	Sripatrao Kadam	29,044	56.52	▲16.03
Independent	Ajbe Vishwanath Dagduji	16,096	31.32	New
CPI	Haral Baburao Govindrao	3,431	6.68	▼52.83
RPI	Sonawane Dharamraj Hariba	2,817	5.48	New
Margin of victory		12,948	25.20	▲6.18
Turnout		53,642	52.61	▼6.42
Total valid votes		51,388		
Registered electors		101,971		▲10.05
INC gain from CPI		Swing	▼2.99	

=== Assembly Election 1967 ===
1967 Maharashtra Legislative Assembly election : Ashti
Party	Candidate	Votes	%	±%
CPI	N. V. Ugale	31,158	59.51	▲28.52
INC	B. K. Ajbe	21,201	40.49	▼92.52
Margin of victory		9,957	19.02	▲14.60
Turnout		54,700	59.03	▲12.38
Total valid votes		52,359		
Registered electors		92,659		▲15.16
CPI gain from INC		Swing	▼9.48	

=== Assembly Election 1962 ===
1962 Maharashtra Legislative Assembly election : Ashti
Party	Candidate	Votes	%	±%
INC	Ramdas Gangaramji Sonone	24,396	46.92	▼8.79
RPI	Krishnarao Bhanuji Shrungare	22,833	43.91	New
INC	Bhausaheb Kashinath	22,638	43.54	▼12.17
CPI	Eknath Baburao	10,960	21.08	▼23.21
PSP	Laxuman Baburao	1,763	3.39	New
Independent	Motiramji Khushalrao Kalaskar	1,388	2.67	New
Independent	Yashwantrao Bapuji Khandare	1,376	2.65	New
Independent	Bandu Akaram Gawa	1,049	2.02	New
Independent	Goma Sonaji Dhemare	953	1.83	New
Margin of victory		1,563	3.01	▼8.40
Turnout		55,670	72.85	▲37.88
Total valid votes		51,995		
Registered electors		76,418		▲6.14
INC hold		Swing	▼8.79	

=== Assembly Election 1957 ===
1957 Bombay State Legislative Assembly election : Ashti
Party	Candidate	Votes	%	±%
INC	Vishwanath Dagdu Ji	14,024	55.71	▲1.47
CPI	Nivirti Ugale	11,151	44.29	New
Margin of victory		2,873	11.41	▼19.04
Turnout		25,175	34.97	▼0.83
Total valid votes		25,175		
Registered electors		71,995		▲67.50
INC hold		Swing	▲1.47	

=== Assembly Election 1952 ===
1952 Hyderabad State Legislative Assembly election : Ashti
Party	Candidate	Votes	%	±%
INC	Rakhamaji Dhondiba Patil	8,346	54.24	New
PDF	Vithal	3,661	23.79	New
Socialist	Jagannath	2,798	18.18	New
Independent	Dattatrya	583	3.79	New
Margin of victory		4,685	30.45	
Turnout		15,388	35.80	
Total valid votes		15,388		
Registered electors		42,981		
INC win (new seat)				

== See also ==
- List of constituencies of Maharashtra Vidhan Sabha
