= Chausala Assembly constituency =

Constituency of the Maharashtra legislative assembly in India

Chausala
- Former constituency for the Maharashtra Legislative Assembly

Constituency details
- Country: India
- Region: Western India
- State: Maharashtra
- Established: 1962
- Abolished: 2008
- Total electors: 2,12,219

Chausala Assembly constituency was an assembly constituency in the India state of Maharashtra.

== Members of the Legislative Assembly ==
Election	Member	Party
1962	Bhaurao Bhagujirao	Indian National Congress
1967	V. A. Darade	Communist Party of India
1972	Sonajirao Kashirsagar	Indian National Congress
1978	Baburao Narsingrao Kokate	Indian National Congress
1980	Chandmal Rajmal Lodha	Indian National Congress
1985	Ashokrao Shankarrao Patil	Indian National Congress
1990	Jaydattaji Kshirsagar	Indian National Congress
1995	Bhai Janardhan Tatyaba Tupe	Peasants and Workers Party of India
1999	Jaydattaji Kshirsagar	Nationalist Congress Party
2004	Keshavrao Yadavrao Andhale	Bharatiya Janata Party

== Election results ==
=== Assembly Election 2004 ===
2004 Maharashtra Legislative Assembly election : Chausala
Party	Candidate	Votes	%	±%
BJP	Andhale Keshavrao Yadavrao	78,439	47.81%	▲16.21
NCP	Jaydattaji Kshirsagar	75,062	45.75%	▲12.57
Independent	Sikandarkhan Husainkhan (Tailor)	2,884	1.76%	New
BSP	More Murlidhar Vithalrao	2,642	1.61%	New
Independent	Shivaji Asraji (Ex-Service Man)	1,526	0.93%	New
Margin of victory		3,377	2.06%	▲0.47
Turnout		1,64,066	77.29%	▲1.86
Registered electors		2,12,219		▲18.67
BJP gain from NCP		Swing	▲14.62	

=== Assembly Election 1999 ===
1999 Maharashtra Legislative Assembly election : Chausala
Party	Candidate	Votes	%	±%
NCP	Kshirsagar Jaidattaji Sonajirao	44,776	33.18%	New
BJP	Andhale Keshavrao Yadavrao	42,632	31.60%	▲2.16
INC	Kokate Maghraj Bahurao	31,086	23.04%	▲7.66
PWPI	Ghumre Balasaheb Chandrakantrao	1,659	1.23%	▼44.17
Independent	Shaikh Siddikh Khaja Mainoddin	1,051	0.78%	New
Independent	Joshi Raju Vasantrao	856	0.63%	New
Independent	Deshmukh Pradeep Dhondiram	829	0.61%	New
Margin of victory		2,144	1.59%	▼14.37
Turnout		1,34,929	69.79%	▲9.09
Registered electors		1,78,826		▲1.53
NCP gain from PWPI		Swing	▼12.21	

=== Assembly Election 1995 ===
1995 Maharashtra Legislative Assembly election : Chausala
Party	Candidate	Votes	%	±%
PWPI	Bhai Tupe Janardhan Tatyaba	53,056	45.39%	▲21.26
BJP	Andhale Keshavrao Yadavrao	34,400	29.43%	▲25.66
INC	Morale Madhavrao Wamanrao	17,974	15.38%	▼32.11
BBM	Hanumant Baburao Upare	4,408	3.77%	New
JD	Aute Jagannath Rangnath	1,390	1.19%	New
Margin of victory		18,656	15.96%	▼7.40
Turnout		1,16,877	64.93%	▲6.40
Registered electors		1,76,127		▼2.02
PWPI gain from INC		Swing	▼2.10	

=== Assembly Election 1990 ===
1990 Maharashtra Legislative Assembly election : Chausala
Party	Candidate	Votes	%	±%
INC	Kshirsagar Jaydatta Sonajirao	51,189	47.49%	▲16.93
PWPI	Tupe Janardhan Tatyaba	26,013	24.13%	▼0.50
Independent	Deshmukh Rajesaheb Balasaheb	13,920	12.91%	New
Independent	Sudhakar Sahebrao Andhale	4,185	3.88%	New
BJP	Munde Trimbak Patloba	4,068	3.77%	New
INS(SCS)	Darade Usha Motiram	1,437	1.33%	New
Independent	Jadhav Vithal Limbajirao	987	0.92%	New
Margin of victory		25,176	23.36%	▲19.57
Turnout		1,07,782	58.69%	▲11.53
Registered electors		1,79,762		▲21.12
INC hold		Swing	▲16.93	

=== Assembly Election 1985 ===
1985 Maharashtra Legislative Assembly election : Chausala
Party	Candidate	Votes	%	±%
INC	Patil Ashokrao Shankarrao	21,967	30.56%	New
Independent	Deshmukh Dnyanoba Sonerao	19,243	26.77%	New
PWPI	Tupe Janardhan Tatyaba	17,709	24.64%	▲11.46
Independent	Lodha Chandmalji Rajmal	5,623	7.82%	New
CPI	Kadam Dnyanobarao Baburao	2,315	3.22%	New
Independent	Landge Dadarao Bhivaji	1,178	1.64%	New
Independent	Kalyan Bhanudas Jagtap	893	1.24%	New
Margin of victory		2,724	3.79%	▼9.49
Turnout		71,873	47.24%	▼4.10
Registered electors		1,48,416		▲9.51
INC gain from INC(U)		Swing	▼5.91	

=== Assembly Election 1980 ===
1980 Maharashtra Legislative Assembly election : Chausala
Party	Candidate	Votes	%	±%
INC(U)	Chandmal Rajmal Lodha	25,963	36.47%	New
INC(I)	Kshirsagar Jaidatta Sonajirao	16,512	23.19%	New
PWPI	Kadam Dnyanobarao Baburao	9,383	13.18%	▼28.06
Independent	Kendre Vyenkat Madhav	6,414	9.01%	New
JP	Rajpal Sahebsing Hazari	3,978	5.59%	New
BJP	Gaikwad Jaising Narayanrao	2,058	2.89%	New
Independent	Dharmaraj Haribhau Sonwane	1,147	1.61%	New
Margin of victory		9,451	13.28%	▲6.94
Turnout		71,192	50.53%	▼3.82
Registered electors		1,35,527		▲11.16
INC(U) gain from INC		Swing	▼11.10	

=== Assembly Election 1978 ===
1978 Maharashtra Legislative Assembly election : Chausala
Party	Candidate	Votes	%	±%
INC	Kokate Baburao Narsingrao	32,681	47.57%	▼5.70
PWPI	Kadam Dnyanobarao Baburao	28,329	41.24%	New
Independent	Ghate Shivaji Pandharinath	2,828	4.12%	New
Independent	Waghmare Machindra Mugaji	1,246	1.81%	New
Independent	Sonawane Dharamaraj Haribhau	941	1.37%	New
Margin of victory		4,352	6.33%	▼27.69
Turnout		68,700	54.15%	▲7.83
Registered electors		1,21,925		▲5.48
INC hold		Swing	▼5.70	

=== Assembly Election 1972 ===
1972 Maharashtra Legislative Assembly election : Chausala
Party	Candidate	Votes	%	±%
INC	Kashirsagar Sonaji	29,877	53.27%	▲20.17
CPI	Darade Vishwanathrao Anna	10,795	19.25%	▼36.17
Independent	Bhosle Bhimrao Kondiba	8,394	14.97%	New
Independent	Deogude Shahaji Kondiba	2,281	4.07%	New
RPI	Arkade Laxman Dhondiba	2,092	3.73%	New
Margin of victory		19,082	34.02%	▲11.70
Turnout		56,083	46.23%	▼3.65
Registered electors		1,15,592		▲14.56
INC gain from CPI		Swing	▼2.15	

=== Assembly Election 1967 ===
1967 Maharashtra Legislative Assembly election : Chausala
Party	Candidate	Votes	%	±%
CPI	V. A. Darade	29,175	55.42%	New
INC	S. L. Kadam	17,424	33.10%	▼18.37
ABJS	B. R. Jagtap	2,408	4.57%	New
Independent	C. Janardhanrao	498	0.89%	New
Margin of victory		11,751	22.32%	▲0.64
Turnout		52,641	49.06%	▲12.99
Registered electors		1,00,900		▲44.18
CPI gain from INC		Swing	▲3.95	

=== Assembly Election 1962 ===
1962 Maharashtra Legislative Assembly election : Chausala
Party	Candidate	Votes	%	±%
INC	Bhaurao Bhagujirao	14,113	51.47%	New
PWPI	Baburao Narsing Rao	8,167	29.79%	New
Independent	Abdul Ghani Lalmiyan	1,767	6.44%	New
Independent	Sonaji Bhimji	845	3.08%	New
Margin of victory		5,946	21.69%	
Turnout		27,418	35.57%	
Registered electors		69,984		
INC win (new seat)				
