= Sandeep Kshirsagar =

Indian politician

Sandeep Ravindra Kshirsagar

Member of the Maharashtra Legislative Assembly
- Incumbent
- Assumed office 2019
- Preceded by: Jaydattaji Kshirsagar
- Constituency: Beed

Personal details
- Born: 27 August 1981 (age 45) At.Beed, Maharashtra
- Party: Nationalist Congress Party (Sharadchandra Pawar)
- Spouse: Neha Kshirsagar
- Relations: Kesharbai Kshirsagar (Grandmother)
- Education: B.Com
- Occupation: Politician, social worker

Sandeep Ravindra Kshirsagar (born 1981) is an Indian politician and a member of the 14th Maharashtra Legislative Assembly representing the Beed Assembly constituency of Maharashtra, India. He belongs to the Nationalist Congress Party (SP).

== Early life and education ==
Kshirsagar is from Beed, Maharashtra. He is the son of Ravindra Sonajirao Kshirsagar. He completed his bachelor in commerce in 2002 at C.K.S. Urf Kaku College, Beed.

== Career ==
Sandeep Bhaiya Kshirsagar won from Beed Assembly constituency representing Nationalist Congress Party (SP) in the 2024 Maharashtra Legislative Assembly election. He polled 101,874 votes and defeated his nearest rival, former MLA and his cousin Yogesh Kshirsagar a member of Nationalist Congress Party. He won by a margin of 5,324 votes. He became an MLA for the first time winning the 2019 Maharashtra Legislative Assembly election representing the Nationalist Congress Party defeating Jaydutt Kshirsagar of Shiva Sena by a margin of 1,984 votes.
