= Bajrang Manohar Sonwane =

Indian politician

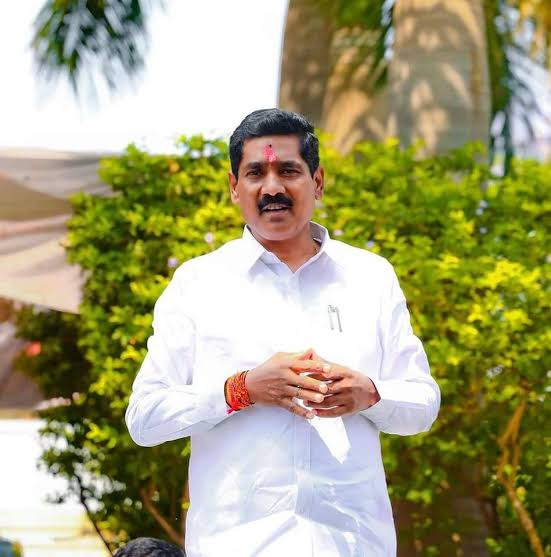

Member of Parliament, Lok Sabha
- Incumbent
- Assumed office 4 June 2024
- Preceded by: Pritam Munde
- Constituency: Beed

Personal details
- Born: 6 July 1970 (age 55)
- Party: NCP (SP) (2024–present)
- Spouse: Sarika Sonwane
- Children: 3

Bajrang Manohar Sonwane is an Indian politician. He is a member of NCP–SP.

== Political career ==
Sonwane was elected as a Parliament member from Beed Lok Sabha Constituency in 2024 Indian general elections.
