= Gangadhar Appa Burande =

Indian politician

Gangadhar Appa Burande (Marathi: गंगाधर अप्पा बुरांडे, 29 December 1919 in Moha – 1 October 2008) was an Indian politician.

He was born in Moha village in the Marathwada region, and went to school in Ambajogai, Nanded and Hyderabad. During his student days in Hyderabad, he became involved in the leftist movement and joined the All India Students Federation. In 1942 he became a member of the Communist Party of India. He was one of the pioneers of establishing and building the Communist Party in Marathwada, and an activist in the anti-Nizam struggle. For a period he was jailed.

Following Independence, he organized the All India Kisan Sabha (Peasants' Union) in Beed District. He served as sarpanch of Moha between 1956 and 1974. In 1960 he founded the organization Maharashtra Shikshan Sanstha, which offers schooling and housing for students from poor backgrounds. He was again jailed between 1962 and 1966. For a brief period, he was a representative in the Beed Zilla Parishad.

When the Communist Party was divided in 1964, Burande sided with the Communist Party of India (Marxist). He became the Secretary of the Beed District Committee of CPI(M), and a member of the Maharashtra State Committee of the party. In 1969, he was elected vice-president of the Maharashtra State Committee of the CPI(M)-led Kisan Sabha.

During the Emergency, Burande was jailed again. He was imprisoned in 1975, and released in 1977. In the 1977 general election he was elected to the Lok Sabha (Lower House of Parliament) from Beed. Burande got 197,497 votes (57.56%), defeating the Congress (I) candidate Laxman Shankarao Deshmukh.

In 1982 he became a member of the Maharashtra State Secretariat of CPI(M). In 1986 he was elected president of the Kisan Sabha in Maharashtra, and was one of the representatives of Maharashtra in the Central Kisan Committee (the national leadership of AIKS). In the 1990s, he stepped down from the CPI(M) State Secretariat, and instead took over as the first chairman of the State Control Commission of the party. At the 2004 state conference of the Kisan Sabha, he was elected vice-president of the State Committee.
