= Prakashdada Solanke =

Indian politician

Member of the Maharashtra Legislative Assembly for Majalgaon
- Incumbent
- Assumed office 2019
- Preceded by: R.T. Deshmukh
- In office 1999–2014
- Preceded by: Bajirao Sonaji Jagtap
- Succeeded by: R.T. Deshmukh

Personal details
- Born: 14 January 1955 (age 71) Dharur Tehsil, Beed district
- Party: Nationalist Congress Party
- Other political affiliations: Bharatiya Janata Party (1999–2009)
- Spouse: Mangala Prakashdada Solanke
- Children: 1
- Parent: Sundarrao Solanke

Prakashdada Sundarrao Solanke (born 1955) is an Indian politician who served as minister of state for revenue, rehabilitation in Maharashtra government. He is a four-time MLA from Majalgaon assembly constituency. His father, Sundarrao Solanke, was a Deputy Chief Minister of Maharashtra and veteran Congress leader.

== Education ==
He studied higher secondary in Modern College, Pune. Then graduated from Fergusson college, Pune. He completed his master's in economics from Mumbai university.

== Positions held ==
- Deputy Chairman, Panchayat Samiti, Majalgaon
- Member of Legislative Assembly Majalgaon – Four times
- Chairman, Loknete sundarrao solanke Sahakari Sakhar Karkhana, Telgaon
- President, Marathwada Shikshan Prasarak Mandal, Aurangabad
- Vice-President, Nationalist Congress Party, Maharashtra region
