= Sundarrao Solanke =

Indian politician (1927–2014)

Sundarrao Abasaheb Solanke

2nd Deputy Chief Minister of Maharashtra
- In office 18 July 1978 – 17 February 1980
- Governor: Sadiq Ali
- Chief Minister: Sharad Pawar
- Preceded by: Nasikrao Tirpude
- Succeeded by: President's Rule
- Constituency: Majalgaon

President, Marathwada Shikshan Prasarak Mandal

President, Beed Zilla Parishad

Personal details
- Born: 17 September 1927 Mohkhed, Marathwada, Hyderabad Princely State
- Died: 5 November 2014 (aged 87) Majalgaon, Maharashtra
- Children: Prakashdada Solanke; Dhairyashil Solanke; Chandrakant Solanke

Sundarrao Abasaheb Solanke (1927–2014) was an Indian politician who served as Deputy Chief Minister of Maharashtra state.

== Developmental work ==
The construction of Beed-Parali road, Parali Thermal Power plant, Majalgaon dam, Majalgaon hydroelectric project, Kundalika project were started and completed during his time by his efforts.

== See also ==
- Prakashdada Solanke
- Baburao Narsingrao Kokate (Adaskar)
- Vilasrao Deshmukh
