= Vimal Mundada =

Indian politician

Dr. Vimal Mundada
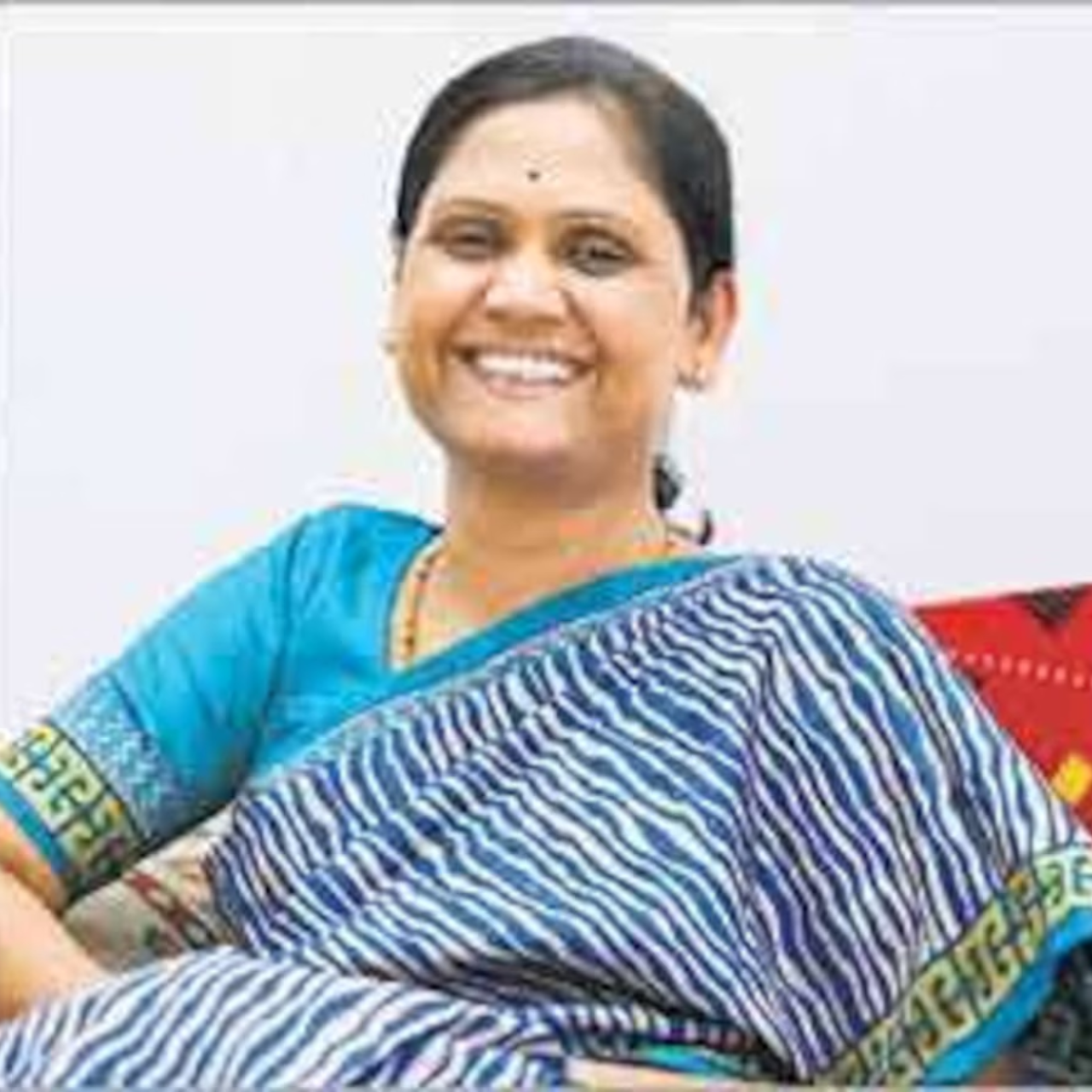

Member of the Maharashtra Legislative Assembly
- In office (1990–1995), (1995–1999), (1999–2004), (2004–2009), (2009 – 2012*)
- Preceded by: Bhagoji Nivruttirao Satpute
- Succeeded by: Pruthviraj Shivaji Sathe
- Constituency: Kaij

Personal details
- Born: 15 August 1963
- Died: 22 March 2012 (aged 48) Mumbai, Maharashtra
- Party: Nationalist Congress Party (1999–2012)
- Other political affiliations: Bharatiya Janata Party (1990–1999)
- Spouse: Nandkishor Mundada
- Children: Akshay Mundada
- Relatives: Namita Mundada (Daughter-in-Law)
- Occupation: Politician
- Profession: Architect

Dr. Vimaltai Nandkishor Mundada (c. 15 August 1963 – 22 March 2012) was an Indian politician from Maharashtra belonging to the Nationalist Congress Party (NCP). During 2004–09, she was minister of Minister of Public Works and Minister for Health in the Government of Maharashtra.

== Political career ==
Dr. Vimaltai Nandkishor Mundada began her political career in 1990 the Bharatiya Janata Party (BJP). She was elected as member of Maharashtra Legislative Assembly from Kaij, a seat reserved for scheduled caste candidates in Beed district. She won the same seat three times after joining the Nationalist Congress Party NCP.

== See also ==
- Namita Mundada
- Pankaja Munde
- Pruthviraj Sathe

== Death ==
Former Maharashtra minister Vimal Mundada died on 22 March 2012.

| Preceded by Vimal Mundada | Minister of Health; 1 November 2004 – 6 December 2008 | Succeeded by Dr. Rajendra Shingne |
| Preceded by Anil Deshmukh | Minister of Public Works; 8 December 2008 – 7 November 2009 | Succeeded by Jaydatta Kshirsagar |
