= Suresh Dhas =

Indian politician

Member of Maharashtra Legislative Assembly
- Incumbent
- Assumed office 2024
- Preceded by: Balasaheb Ajabe
- Constituency: Ashti
- In office 1999–2014
- Preceded by: Sahebrao Darekar
- Succeeded by: Bhimrao Dhonde
- Constituency: Ashti

Member of Maharashtra Legislative Council
- In office 22 June 2018 – 21 June 2024
- Preceded by: Diliprao Deshmukh
- Constituency: Osamanabad -Latur-Beed Local Authority

Minister of State Government of Maharashtra
- In office 11 June 2013 – 28 September 2014
- Chief Minister: Prithviraj Chavan
- Minister: Balasaheb Thorat
- Department: Revenue

Personal details
- Born: 2 February 1969 (age 57)
- Party: Bharatiya Janata Party
- Other political affiliations: Nationalist Congress Party

Suresh Ramchandra Dhas (born 1969) is an Indian politician from Maharashtra. He is a four-time member of the Maharashtra Legislative Assembly. He is one time member of Maharashtra Legislative Council From 2018 to 2024. He won as an MLA for the fourth time winning the 2024 Maharashtra Legislative Assembly election representing the Bharatiya Janata Party from the Ashti Assembly constituency in Beed District.

He served as minister of state for revenue, and rehabilitation in Maharashtra government.

== Early life and education ==
Suresh Dhas is from Jamgaon, Ashti. He has two sons, Jaydatta Dhas and Sagar Dhas. He completed his bachelor's degree in arts at Commerce and Science College, Tal Ashti, Beed and later did his M.S. at Dr. Babasaheb Ambedkar Marathwada University, Aurangabad in 1993.

== Career ==
Suresh won from the Ashti Assembly constituency representing the Bharatiya Janata Party in the 2024 Maharashtra Legislative Assembly election. He polled 140,507 votes and defeated his nearest rival, Bhimrao Anandrao Dhonde, an independent politician, by a huge margin of 77,975 votes.

He first became an MLA winning the 1999 Maharashtra Legislative Assembly election representing the BJP and retained it in the 2004 Maharashtra Legislative Assembly election. He won for third time in the 2009 Assembly election representing the Nationalist Congress Party and defeated the BJP candidate Balasaheb Ajabe by a margin of 34,690 votes. He lost the next election in 2014 and contested MLC in 2018 for Usamanabad-Latur-Beed Local Authorities & got elected for Maharashtra legislative council. Once again in 2024 he got elected for a fourth time to the Maharashtra legislative assembly.

He served as minister of state for revenue, and rehabilitation in Maharashtra government. He won his seat in the Maharashtra council on 11 June 2018 with 526 votes while Ashok Jagdale, the candidate backed by the Nationalist Congress Party, earned 452 votes.
