= Gopinath Munde =

Indian politician and statesman (1949–2013)

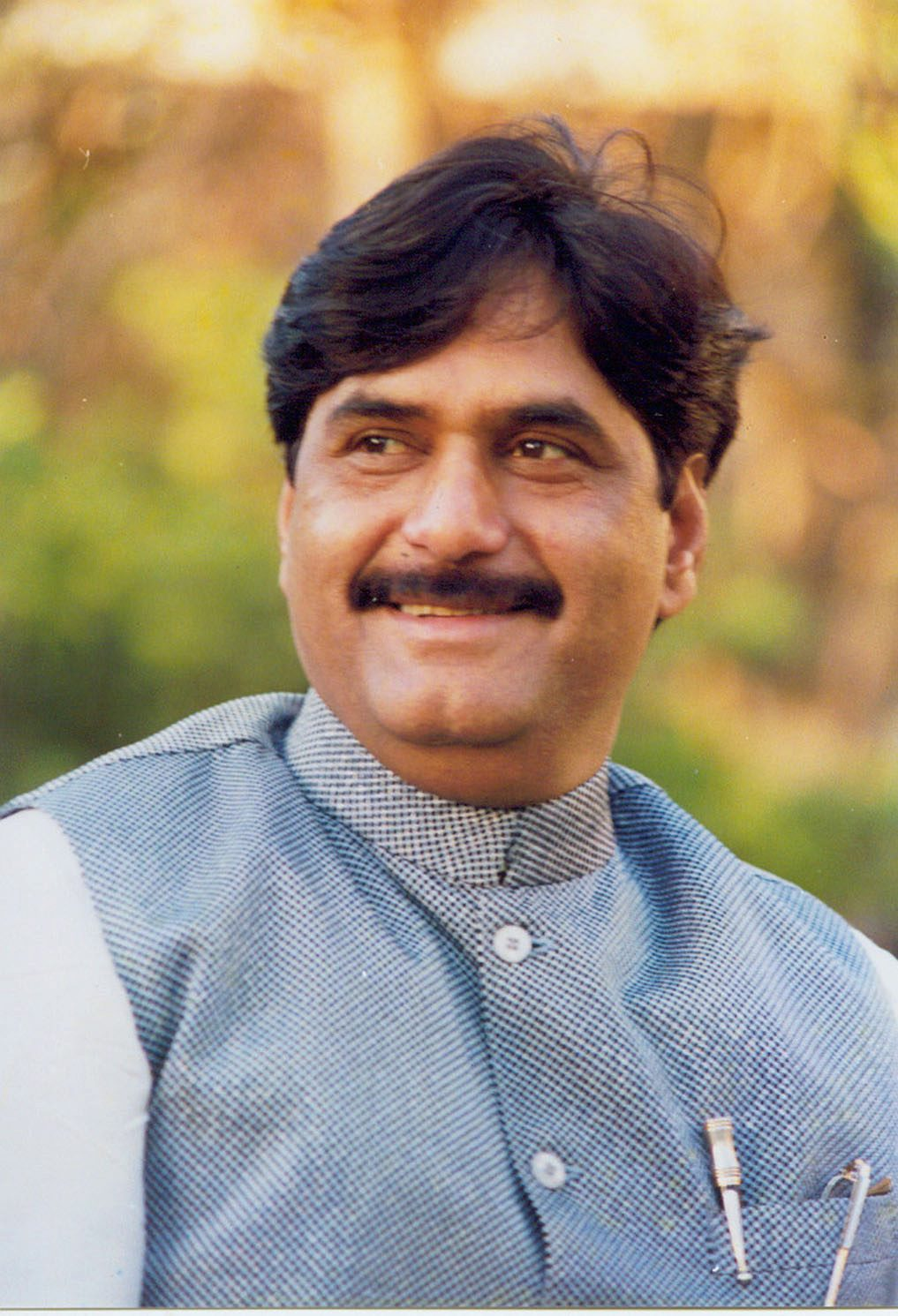
- Munde in 2008

Union Minister of Rural Development
- In office 26 May 2014 – 3 June 2014
- President: Pranab Mukherjee
- Prime Minister: Narendra Modi
- Preceded by: Jairam Ramesh
- Succeeded by: Nitin Jairam Gadkari

Union Minister of Panchayati Raj
- In office 26 May 2014 – 3 June 2014
- President: Pranab Mukherjee
- Prime Minister: Narendra Modi
- Preceded by: Kishore Chandra Deo
- Succeeded by: Nitin Gadkari

Union Minister of Drinking Water and Sanitation
- In office 26 May 2014 – 3 June 2014
- President: Pranab Mukherjee
- Prime Minister: Narendra Modi
- Preceded by: Bharatsinh Madhavsinh Solanki
- Succeeded by: Nitin Gadkari

Deputy Leader of the House, Lok Sabha
- In office 26 May 2014 – 3 June 2014
- President: Pranab Mukherjee
- Prime Minister: Narendra Modi
- Speaker: Kamal Nath (pro-tem)
- Leader of the House: Narendra Modi
- Preceded by: Mallikarjun Kharge
- Succeeded by: Sushma Swaraj

Deputy Leader of the Opposition in Lok Sabha
- In office 22 December 2009 – 20 May 2014
- President: Pratibha Patil; Pranab Mukherjee
- Prime Minister: Manmohan Singh
- Speaker: Meira Kumar
- Leader of the Opposition: Sushma Swaraj
- Preceded by: Sushma Swaraj
- Succeeded by: Gaurav Gogoi (2024)

Member of Parliament, Lok Sabha
- In office 16 May 2009 – 3 June 2014
- Preceded by: Jaisingrao Gaikwad Patil
- Succeeded by: Pritam Munde
- Constituency: Beed, Maharashtra

4th Deputy Chief Minister of Maharashtra
- In office 1 February 1999 – 18 October 1999
- Governor: P. C. Alexander
- Chief Minister: Narayan Rane
- Department & Ministry: Home Affairs; State Border Defence (First); Command Area Development (1 February 1999 - 11 May 1999); Disaster Management (1 February 1999 - 11 May 1999); Forests (1 February 1999 - 11 May 1999); Protocol (11 May 1999 - 17 October 1999); Ex-Servicemen Welfare (11 May 1999 - 17 October 1999); Rural Development (11 May 1999 - 17 October 1999); Panchayat Raj (11 May 1999 - 17 October 1999); Special Backward Classes Welfare (11 May 1999 - 17 October 1999); Other Backward Classes (11 May 1999 - 17 October 1999); Khar Land Development (11 May 1999 - 17 October 1999)
- Preceded by: Himself
- Succeeded by: Chhagan Bhujbal
- In office 14 March 1995 – 31 January 1999
- Governor: P. C. Alexander
- Chief Minister: Manohar Joshi
- Department & Ministry: Home Affairs; Other Backward Classes; Special Backward Classes Welfare
- Preceded by: Ramrao Adik (1983 - 1985)
- Succeeded by: Himself

Leader of the House of the Maharashtra Legislative Council
- In office 14 March 1995 – 1 February 1999
- Governor: P. C. Alexander
- Chief Minister: Manohar Joshi
- Chairman of the House: Jayant Shridhar Tilak; Bhaurao Tulshiram Deshmukh (Acting Chairman); N. S. Pharande
- Deputy Leader: Sudhir Joshi
- Preceded by: Shivajirao Deshmukh
- Succeeded by: Sudhir Joshi

14th Leader of the Opposition in Maharashtra Legislative Assembly
- In office 12 December 1991 – 14 March 1995
- Chief Minister: Sudhakarrao Naik; Sharad Pawar
- Preceded by: Manohar Joshi
- Succeeded by: Madhukar Pichad

Member of Maharashtra Legislative Assembly
- In office 1990–2009
- Preceded by: Panditrao Daund
- Succeeded by: constituency dissolved
- Constituency: Renapur
- In office 1980–1985
- Preceded by: Raghunath Munde
- Succeeded by: Panditrao Daund
- Constituency: Renapur

Personal details
- Born: Gopinathrao Pandurang Munde; 12 December 1949 Parli, Hyderabad State, India (present-day Maharashtra)
- Died: 3 June 2014 (aged 64) New Delhi, Delhi, India
- Cause of death: Car crash
- Party: Bhartiya Janata Party
- Spouse: Pradnya Mahajan (m. 1978)
- Relations: Pramod Mahajan (brother-in-law); Dhananjay Munde (nephew)
- Children: 3, including Pankaja Munde; Pritam Munde
- Website: www.gopinathraomunde.com

Gopinathrao Pandurang Munde, also known as Loknete Munde Saheb (12 December 1949 – 3 June 2014) was an Indian politician and statesman from the state of Maharashtra. He was the strongest mass-leader of the Bharatiya Janata Party (BJP) known for his charismatic personality and the ability to deliver heartfelt speeches to connect with the audience.

He held multiple important roles simultaneously as the Union Minister for Rural Development, Drinking Water & Sanitation and Panchayati Raj in Narendra Modi's cabinet until his death.

Munde and his brother-in-law Pramod Mahajan have are widely credited with building BJP into a significant political force within the state, where INC & NCP were in power. Gopinath Munde's untimely death created a power vacuum in Maharashtra for the BJP government; for he was the senior most BJP leader who was next in line to become the Chief Minister of Maharashtra; perhaps the only CM candidate at that time. He was the key mediator in creating the BJP - Shiv Sena alliance; while also being the one who united the OBC's of Maharashtra to vote for the alliance.

Munde was well-known for his efforts in curbing the underworld in Mumbai during his tenure as Deputy Chief Minister of Maharashtra, overseeing the Ministry of Home Affairs from 1995 to 1999. He was a key figure in introducing the Maharashtra Control of Organised Crime Act (MCOCA), later ratified by the Supreme Court of India.

== Early life and education ==
Gopinath Pandurang Munde was born on 12 December 1949 in Parali, Maharashtra, in a middle-class farmer's family. His parents were Pandurang Rao and Limba Bai Munde.

Munde's primary education took place in his village 'Nathra' in Beed District, where classes were held under the shade of a tree due to the absence of a school building. He continued his secondary education at the Zilla Parishad School in the tehsil town of Parali. He frequently visited the Arya Samaj Mandir to read newspapers, books and listen to discourses by wise men.

Munde pursued a Bachelor of Commerce degree at a college in Ambejogai. Despite his lack of a political background, he emerged as a key figure in the student movement during his college years. His influence was instrumental in the success of his peers in elections. He became a 'Kingmaker' of sorts, ensuring victory of members of his group though he did not win an election even once during his college years.

He also studied law for 2 years in ILS Law College in Pune; he graduated with a 'Bachelor of General Law' degree in the year 1976. His longtime close friend and colleague Vilasrao Deshmukh (former CM of Maharashtra) also studied in the same college.

Munde was a Swayamsevak of Rashtriya Swayamsevak Sangh and was actively involved in RSS affairs of the Maharashtra state. He was also the leader of Akhil Bharatiya Vidyarthi Parishad.

== Political career ==
=== Work against underworld ===
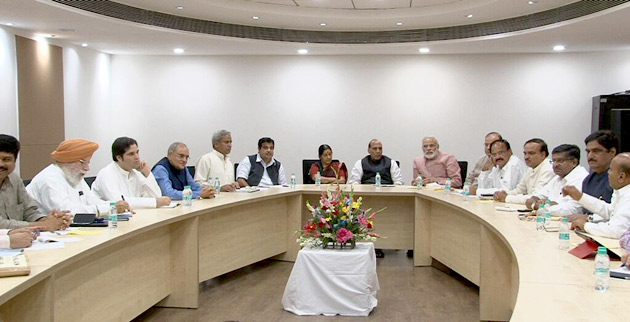
BJP Election Campaign meet on 1 August 2013

During his tenure as Deputy Chief Minister of Maharashtra, Gopinath Munde played a pivotal role in combating gang wars and the underworld. After the 1993 Mumbai attacks, Munde assumed responsibility for the Home Ministry in Maharashtra and launched an aggressive campaign against underworld dons and their networks. His efforts were instrumental in curbing the influence of organised crime in Mumbai during that period, earning him widespread recognition and respect for his decisive actions against criminal elements.

=== Energy Minister ===
Gopinath Munde also held the Energy Ministry during his tenure as Deputy Chief Minister of Maharashtra. In that role, he fronted the state’s showdown with Enron’s Dabhol Power Project—halting the costly contract within months of taking office and driving the company to renegotiate its tariff at lower rates later the same year. He also intervened in domestic pricing, stopping a proposed Tata Electric tariff hike for Mumbai consumers in September 1996.

=== Vidhan Sabha ===
Munde first contested the Vidhan Sabha elections in 1978 from the Parali constituency but was unsuccessful. However, in 1980, he was elected to the Vidhan Sabha from Renapur as a BJP candidate, marking the beginning of his legislative career. He retained his seat in subsequent elections in 1995, 1999, and 2004. From 12 December 1991 to 14 March 1995, Munde served as the Leader of the Opposition in the Maharashtra Vidhan Sabha, where he was known for his strong and articulate advocacy for the opposition's stance on various issues. His leadership qualities were further recognised when he was sworn in as the Deputy Chief Minister of Maharashtra on 14 March 1995 under the Manohar Joshi led government.

=== Lok Sabha ===
Munde transitioned to national politics and was elected as a member of the 15th Lok Sabha (2009–2014), representing the Beed constituency. To secure his position, he defeated the NCP candidate, Rameshrao Baburao Kokate (Adaskar). In the 2014 general elections, Munde once again won the Beed constituency, this time by a significant margin of 140,000 votes. Following this victory, on 26 May 2014, he was appointed Minister of Rural Development in the cabinet of Prime Minister Narendra Modi. Days after assuming office, Munde died in a car accident.

== Personal life ==
Gopinath Munde's parents, Pandurang Rao and Limbabai, faced numerous challenges but were determined to provide him with a good education. After his father's death in 1969, his brothers took on the responsibility of supporting his education. Munde was the third child in his family. He is a political figure belonging to the dominant Vanjari community and has held significant roles in Bharatiya Janata Party.

During his college days at Ambajogai, Munde met Pradnya, who would later become his wife. Pradnya, a graduate, chose to be a homemaker. His brother in-law, Pramod Mahajan, was a well-known politician and served as Union Cabinet Minister in the Atal Bihari Vajpayee government. They lived in the same apartment building next to each other in Worli until the tragic murder of Pramod Mahajan (at the hands of his own brother Pravin Mahajan).

Munde and Pradnya had three daughters: Pankaja, Pritam, and Yashashree. Pankaja Munde, the eldest, served as a cabinet minister in the Maharashtra Government from 2014 to 2019. Pritam Munde, their second daughter, became a member of the Lok Sabha in 2014, winning the seat left vacant by her father's sudden and tragic death.

== Death ==
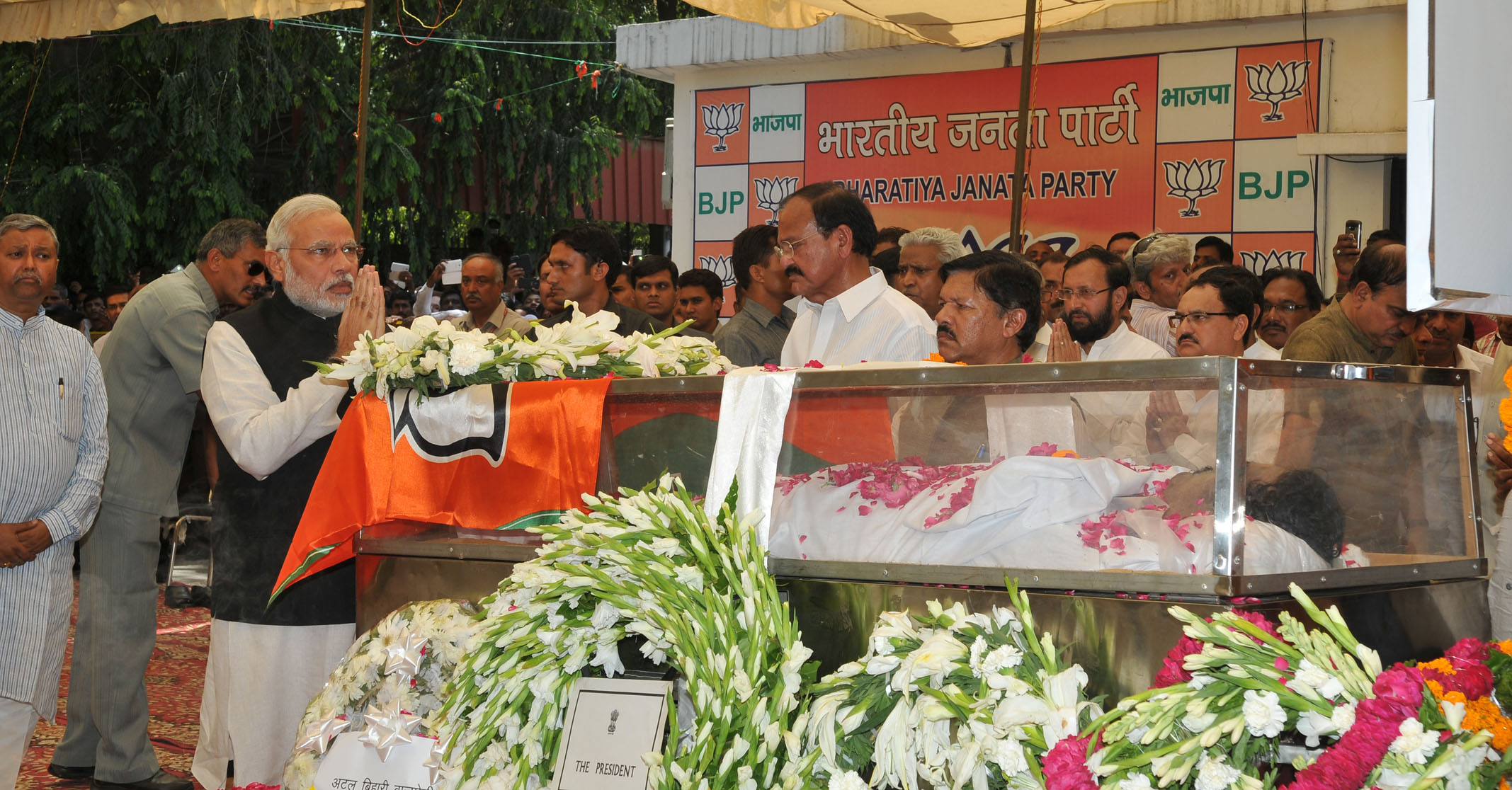
Prime Minister Narendra Modi pays homage to his late colleague Munde in 2014

Munde was in a road accident in the early morning of 3 June 2014, while on his way to Delhi Airport. He was going for his first official meeting after assuming official posts. The accident took place between Safdarjung Road and Prithviraj Road, New Delhi where his car was hit by a speeding cab. He was rushed to AIIMS Delhi but later went into cardiac arrest. He was administered CPR but could not be resuscitated and was declared dead at 7:20 a.m.

Munde suffered cervical fractures due to which supply of oxygen to his brain was cut off. Further, his liver was ruptured due to impact of accident, leading to cardiac arrest.

His funeral was held at 2pm on 4 June 2014 at his native place Parali Vaijnath near Beed. Pankaja, Munde's eldest daughter performed the last rites of her father.

It is believed that more than 700.000 people had gathered to attend his funeral, travelling from distant places to pay homage; a moment which everyone compared to Balasaheb Thackeray's funeral. There were riots near the funeral place where his supporters set government vehicles on fire demanding a probe into his death. Stones were pelted at the arrival of Nitin Gadkari as he was publicly known to be the in-party opposer of Munde and Pramod Mahajan.

== Conspiracy related to cause of death ==
On 21 January 2019, a self-styled cyber expert seeking political asylum in the United States claimed at a London event, without providing evidence, that Munde was murdered because of his alleged knowledge of election rigging in the 2014 Indian general election. The Bharatiya Janata Party rejected the claim, alleging Indian National Congress involvement and citing the presence of its leader Kapil Sibal at the event. The Election Commission of India released a statement, calling the event a "motivated slugfest".

Lok Sabha
| Preceded by Jaisingrao Gaikwad Patil | Member of Parliament for Beed; 16 May 2009 – 3 June 2014 | Succeeded by Pritam Munde |
Political offices
| Preceded by Ramrao Adik | Deputy Chief Minister of Maharashtra; 19 March 1995 – 17 October 1999 | Succeeded by Chhagan Bhujbal |
| Preceded by Jairam Ramesh | Minister of Rural Development; 26 May 2014 – 3 June 2014 | Succeeded by Nitin Gadkari |
| Preceded by Kishore Chandra Deo | Minister of Panchayati Raj; 26 May 2014 – 3 June 2014 | Succeeded by Nitin Gadkari |
| Preceded by Bharatsinh Madhavsinh Solanki; Minister of State (Independent Charge) | Minister of Drinking Water and Sanitation; 26 May 2014 – 3 June 2014 | Succeeded by Nitin Gadkari |
