= Kesharbai Kshirsagar =

Indian politician (1930–2006)

Kesharbai Kshirsagar (1930–2006) was an Indian politician and three-time member of the Lok Sabha.

== Early life ==
Kesharbai was born in Nimgaon Mhalungi village of Pune district on 29 March 1927.

== Career ==
Known for her social work, Kshirsagar was elected the sarpanch of Rajuri village (Beed) in 1962 and the chairman of panchayat samiti in 1967. She entered the Maharashtra Legislative Assembly in 1972 as an Indian National Congress (INC) politician representing Chausala and served on its Committee on Public Undertakings.

INC (I) made Kshirsagar its official candidate from Beed constituency during the 1980 Indian general election. She won the seat, defeating her nearest rival by a difference of 67,503 votes and became a member of the 7th Lok Sabha (1980–84). She was re-elected in 1984 and 1991. As an MP, she served on various parliamentary committees, including the one for official languages. Later Kshirsagar joined the Nationalist Congress Party (NCP).

== Personal life ==
At the age of 15, Kesharbai was married to Sonajirao Kshirsagar. They had 8 children and one of their sons, Jaydattaji Kshirsagar, was elected to the Maharashtra Legislative Assembly in 1990. She was fondly called Kesharkaku and died on 4 October 2006 at a hospital in Mumbai.
