= Namita Mundada =

Indian politician

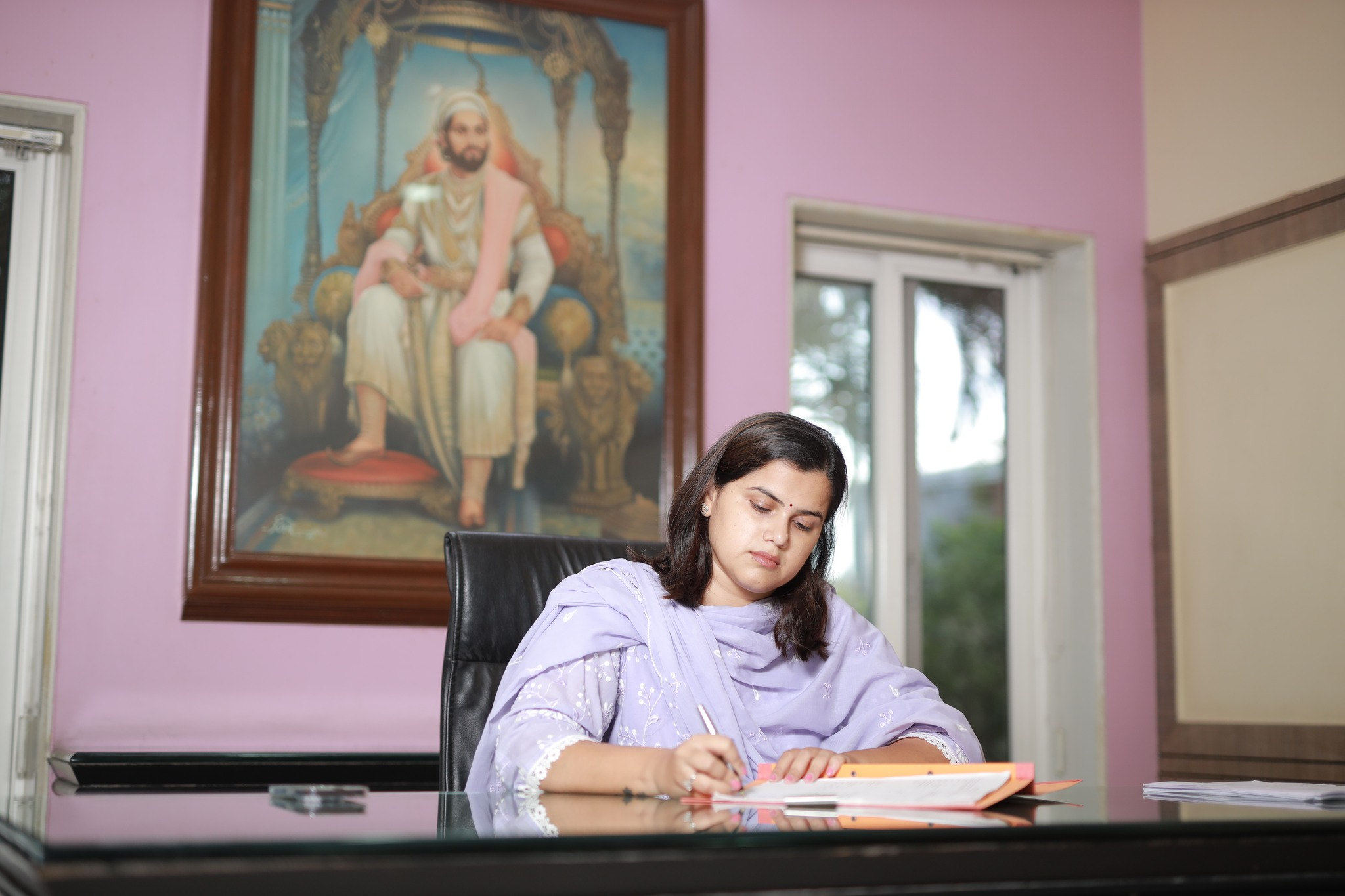

Member of the Maharashtra Legislative Assembly
- In office 2019–Incumbent
- Preceded by: Sangeeta Vijayprakash Thombre
- Constituency: Kaij

Personal details
- Born: 4 March 1989 (age 37)
- Party: Bharatiya Janata Party (2019 - Present)
- Other political affiliations: Nationalist Congress Party (2014-2019)
- Spouse: Akshay Mundada
- Relatives: Vimal Mundada (Mother-in-Law)
- Occupation: Politician
- Profession: Architect

Namita Akshay Mundada is an Indian politician from Maharashtra. She is a second term member of the Maharashtra Legislative Assembly representing the Bharatiya Janata Party from Kaij Assembly constituency in Beed city.

== Early life and background ==
Namita Mundada is from Beed, Maharashtra. She was married Akshay Mundada.

== Career ==
Mundada won the 2024 Maharashtra Legislative Assembly election from Kaij Assembly constituency representing the Bharatiya Janata Party entering the Maharashtra Legislative Assembly for the first time. She is one of the 19 women in the assembly.

She first became an MLA winning the 2019 Maharashtra Legislative Assembly election defeating Pruthviraj Shivaji Sathe of the Nationalist Congress Party by a margin of 1,598 votes.

She was active in the assembly, and raised several critical issues during the COVID-19 period. She also raised other problems related to sugarcane processing and infrastructure gaps.

== See also ==
- Vimal Mundada
