= Baijnath =

Baijnath or Vaijnath is a hypocoristic form of Vaidyanatha, referring to the Vaidyanath Jyotirlinga - an abode of the Hindu god Shiva, and may specifically mean:

- Baijnath, Himachal Pradesh, a village in Himachal Pradesh, India
  - Baijnath Temple, a Hindu temple in the village, believed to be the Vaidyanath Jyotirlinga
  - Baijnath (Vidhan Sabha constituency)
- Baijnath, Uttarakhand, a town in Uttarakhand, India
  - Baijnath Temple Complex, a cluster of 18 Hindu temples in the village
- Baijnath, Kaimur, a village in Bihar, India
- Parli Vaijnath, a city in Maharashtra, India
  - Shri Vaijnath Temple, a Hindu Shiva temple in Parli Vaijnath, Maharashtra, India
- Baijnath Kureel, Indian politician
- Baijnath Maharaj, Indian spiritual leader and educator
- Vaijnath Mohiniraj Pundlik, Indian architect
- Vaijnath Patil (1938–2019), Indian politician
- Vaijnath Shinde, Indian politician

== See also ==
- Vaidyanatha (disambiguation)
