= Vaidyanathan =

Vaidyanathan வைத்தியநாதன்
- Pronunciation: Vaittiyanātaṉ
- Gender: Male
- Language: Tamil

Origin
- Region of origin: Southern India; North-eastern Sri Lanka

Other names
- Alternative spelling: Vaithianathan

Vaidyanathan or Vaithianathan (Tamil: வைத்தியநாதன்) is a Tamil male given name. Due to the Tamil tradition of using patronymic surnames it may also be a surname for males and females.

== Notable people ==
=== Given name ===
- Kanthiah Vaithianathan (1896–1965), Ceylonese civil servant
- Kunnakudi Vaidyanathan (1935–2008), Indian classical music violinist
- L. Vaidyanathan (1942–2007), Indian musicologist
- L. V. Vaidyanathan (1928–2000), Indian soil scientist
- M. Vaithianathan, Indian politician
- P. P. Vaidyanathan (born 1954), Indian academic
- S. R. D. Vaidyanathan (1929–2013), Indian musician
- Sunil Vaidyanathan (born 1976), Indian author
- Tiruvarur Vaidyanathan (born 1963), Indian mridangam artist
- V. Vaidyanathan (born 1968), Indian businessman

=== Surname ===
- Ameya Vaidyanathan (born 1996), Indian racing driver
- Ananth Vaidyanathan (born 1957), Indian singing trainer
- Anu Vaidyanathan (born 1983/4), Indian triathlete
- Arun Vaidyanathan, Indian-American film director
- Ganesh Vaidyanathan (born 1956), American academic
- Nirupama Vaidyanathan (born 1976), Indian tennis player
- Rama Vaidyanathan, Indian bharatnatyam artist
- Rhema Vaithianathan, New Zealand academic
- Saroja Vaidyanathan (1937–2023), Indian choreographer
- Suresh Vaidyanathan (born 1966), Indian performing artist
- Vaithianathan Navaratnam (1909–2006), Ceylonese politician
- Vaidyanathan Thirunavukkarasu (1926–2008), Singaporean journalist
- Vaithianathan Venkatasubramanian, American academic
- Vasantha Vaidyanathan (1937–2018), Sri Lankan broadcaster
- Vinodhini Vaidyanathan (born 1981), Indian actress

== See also ==
- Vaidyanathapura
