= Vaidyanatha =

Vaidyanatha or Vaidyanath is usually a form of jyotirlinga, see Vaidyanath Jyotirlinga.

Vaidyanatha is also given name of some Shaivite Hindus in India:

- A. Vaidyanatha Iyer (1890–1955), an Indian activist, politician and freedom-fighter
- Chembai or Chembai Vaidyanatha Bhagavatar (1896–1974), an Indian musicologist
- Vaidyanatha Dikshita, a 15th-century Indian writer, author of the astrological text Jataka Parijata
- Vaidyanath Mishra (1911–1998), better known by his pen name Nagarjun, was an Indian Hindi and Maithili poet

== See also ==
- Baijnath (disambiguation), alternative form of Vaidyanatha
- Vaidyanathan, alternative form of the given name
- Baidyanath Temple, a Hindu temple in Deoghar, Jharkhand, India, believed to be the Vaidyanath Jyotirlinga (an abode of the god Shiva)
- Baidyanath Group, an Indian pharmaceutical company
- Baidyanath Village, a village in Bihar, India
- Baidyanathpur, Paschim Bardhaman, a town in West Bengal, India
