= Sunil =

- Gender: Male
- Language: Hindi; Bangla; Kannada; Marathi; Sanskrit; Tamil; Telugu; Malayalam; Urdu

Origin
- Region of origin: India

Sunil (सुनील) is a first name for males, often found in the South Asian community. The Sanskrit word sunīla means "dark", "very blue", and is also an epithet of Krishna.

== Notable people ==
- Sunil (actor), Indian Telugu film actor
- Sunil (Kannada actor) (1964-1994)
- Sunil (director), Indian Malayalam film director
- Sunil Kumar Ahuja (born 1961), American scientist
- Sunil Ambwani (born 1952), Indian judge
- Sunil Ariyaratne (born 1949), Sri Lankan director, lyricist, poet and writer
- Sunil Barve (born 1966), Indian actor and producer
- Sunil Batta (born 1961), Indian cameraman, director, producer and scriptwriter
- Sunil Bohra, Indian film producer
- Sunil Chhetri (born 1984), Indian footballer
- Sunil Kumar Choudhary (1980–2008), Indian military officer
- Sunil Deshmukh (born 1958), Indian doctor and member of Legislative Assembly
- Sunil Dhaniram (born 1968), Canadian cricketer
- Sunil Dutt (1929–2005), Indian actor, director, politician and producer
- Sunil Edirisinghe (born 1949), Sri Lankan musician
- Sunil Gaikwad (born 1970), Indian politician
- Sunil Gangopadhyay (1934–2012), Indian novelist and poet
- Sunil Ganguly (musician) (1936–1999), Indian steel guitarist
- Sunil Gavaskar (born 1949), Indian cricketer
- Sunil Grover (born 1977), Indian comedian and actor
- Sunil Gulati (born 1959), American-Indian president of the United States Soccer Federation
- Sunil Handunnetti (born 1970), Sri Lankan politician and a member of the Parliament of Sri Lanka
- Sunil Hettiarachchi (born 1937), Sri Lankan actor
- Sunil Jadhav (born 1992), Indian cricketer
- Sunil Janah (1918–2012), Indian photojournalist and photographer
- Sunil Jayasinghe (1955–1995), Sri Lankan cricketer
- Sunil Jogi (born 1971), Indian poet and writer
- Sunil Joshi (born 1970), Indian cricketer
- Sunil Kanoria (born 1965), Indian entrepreneur
- Sunil Khan (born 1947), Indian politician
- Sunil Mahato (1966–2007), member of the 14th Lok Sabha of India
- Sunil Maitra (1927–1996), Indian politician and member of the 7th Lok Sabha of India
- Sunil Mittal (born 1957), Indian entrepreneur, philanthropist and founder and chairman of Group CEO of Bharti Enterprises
- Sunil Mukhi (born 1956), Indian physicist and theorist
- Sunil Narine (born 1988), Trinidadian cricketer
- Sunil Oasis (born 1973), Indian cricketer
- Sunil Padwal (born 1968), Indian painter
- Sunil Pandey (born 1966), Indian politician
- Sunil Babu Pant (born 1972), Nepalese politician
- Sunil Paul (born 1964), Indian entrepreneur
- Sunil Perera (1952-2021), Sri Lankan composer, guitarist, songwriter and vocalist
- Sunil Pradhan (born 1957), Indian doctor, neurologist, researcher and writer
- Sunil Prajapati (born 1994), Nepali politician
- Sunil Raoh (born 1980), Indian actor, lyricist and singer
- Sunil Santha (1915–1981), Sri Lankan composer, lyricist and singer
- Sunil Sawney (born 1962), English cricketer
- Sunil Shanbag (born 1956), Indian actor and screenwriter
- Sunil Shetty (born 1961), Indian film actor, businessman, entrepreneur and producer
- Sunil Tagare (born 1962), Indian entrepreneur
- Sunil Thakur (born 1984), Indian footballer
- Sunil Thapa (born 1957), Nepalese actor
- Sunil Vaidyanathan (born 1976), Indian photojournalist and photographer
- Sunil Valson (born 1958), Indian cricketer
- Sunil Kumar Verma (born 1974), Indian biologist, scientist and zoologist
- Sunil Wettimuny (born 1949), Sri Lankan cricketer

== Fictional characters ==
- Sunil Bakshi (portrayed by Simon Kassianides), a high-ranking member of Hydra in Season 2 of Agents of S.H.I.E.L.D.
- DI Sunil 'Sunny' Khan, portrayed by Sanjeev Bhaskar in the ITV1 drama Unforgotten
- Sunil Markesh (known as "Mobley"), from the television series Mr. Robot, played by Azhar Khan
- Sunil Nevla, from the cartoon Littlest Pet Shop
