= Vaidyanath Jyotirlinga =

Hindu temple

Vaidyanath Jyotirlinga, also known as Baidyanath, Vaijnath and Baijnath is one of the twelve Jyotirlingas, the most sacred abodes of Shiva. However, the location of the Jyotirlinga is contested as the Government of India hasn't notified one of these temples as the Jyotirlinga. The claimed temples with their locations are:

- Shri Vaijnath Temple, Parli, Maharashtra
- Baidyanath Temple, Deoghar, Jharkhand
- Baijnath Temple, Kangra, Himachal Pradesh
- Mahabaleshwar Temple, Gokarna

== Background ==
In Dvādaśa Jyotirliṅga Smaranam, the 12 jyotirlingas are described as follows:

Sanskrit	IAST
सौराष्ट्रे सोमनाथं च श्रीशैले मल्लिकार्जुनम् । उज्जयिन्यां महाकाळम् ओङ्कारममलेश्वरम् ॥ परल्यां वैद्यनाथं च डाकिन्यां भीमशङ्करम् । सेतुबन्धे तु रामेशं नागेशं दारुकावने ॥ वाराणस्यां तु विश्वेशं त्र्यंबकं गौतमीतटे । हिमालये तु केदारं घुश्मेशं च शिवालये ॥ एतानि ज्योतिर्लिङ्गानि सायं प्रातः पठेन्नरः । सप्तजन्मकृतं पापं स्मरणेन विनश्यति ॥	saurāṣṭre somanāthaṁ ca śrīśaile mallikārjunam । ujjayinyāṁ mahākālam oṅkāramamaleśvaram ॥ paralyāṁ vaidyanāthaṁ ca ḍākinyāṁ bhīmaśaṅkaram । setubandhe tu rāmeśaṁ nāgeśaṁ dārukāvane ॥ vārāṇasyāṁ tu viśveśaṁ tryaṁbakaṁ gautamītaṭe । himālaye tu kedāraṁ ghuśmeśaṁ ca śivālaye ॥ etāni jyotirliṅgāni sāyaṁ prātaḥ paṭhennaraḥ । saptajanmakr̥taṁ pāpaṁ smaraṇena vinaśyati ॥

While in Dvādaśa Jyotirliṅga Stotram, the 12 jyotirlingas are described as follows:

Sanskrit	IAST
सौराष्ट्रदेशे विशदेऽतिरम्ये ज्योतिर्मयं चन्द्रकलावतंसम् । भक्तिप्रदानाय कृपावतीर्णं तं सोमनाथं शरणं प्रपद्ये ॥ श्रीशैलशृङ्गे विबुधातिसङ्गे तुलाद्रितुङ्गेऽपि मुदा वसन्तम् । तमर्जुनं मल्लिकपूर्वमेकं नमामि संसारसमुद्रसेतुम् ॥ अवन्तिकायां विहितावतारं मुक्तिप्रदानाय च सज्जनानाम् । अकालमृत्योः परिरक्षणार्थं वन्दे महाकालमहासुरेशम् ॥ कावेरिकानर्मदयोः पवित्रे समागमे सज्जनतारणाय । सदैवमान्धातृपुरे वसन्तमोङ्कारमीशं शिवमेकमीडे ॥ पूर्वोत्तरे प्रज्वलिकानिधाने सदा वसन्तं गिरिजासमेतम् । सुरासुराराधितपादपद्मं श्रीवैद्यनाथं तमहं नमामि ॥ याम्ये सदङ्गे नगरेऽतिरम्ये विभूषिताङ्गं विविधैश्च भोगैः । सद्भक्तिमुक्तिप्रदमीशमेकं श्रीनागनाथं शरणं प्रपद्ये ॥ महाद्रिपार्श्वे च तटे रमन्तं सम्पूज्यमानं सततं मुनीन्द्रैः । सुरासुरैर्यक्ष महोरगाढ्यैः केदारमीशं शिवमेकमीडे ॥ सह्याद्रिशीर्षे विमले वसन्तं गोदावरितीरपवित्रदेशे । यद्धर्शनात्पातकमाशु नाशं प्रयाति तं त्र्यम्बकमीशमीडे ॥ सुताम्रपर्णीजलराशियोगे निबध्य सेतुं विशिखैरसंख्यैः । श्रीरामचन्द्रेण समर्पितं तं रामेश्वराख्यं नियतं नमामि ॥ यं डाकिनिशाकिनिकासमाजे निषेव्यमाणं पिशिताशनैश्च । सदैव भीमादिपदप्रसिद्दं तं शङ्करं भक्तहितं नमामि ॥ सानन्दमानन्दवने वसन्तमानन्दकन्दं हतपापवृन्दम् । वाराणसीनाथमनाथनाथं श्रीविश्वनाथं शरणं प्रपद्ये ॥ इलापुरे रम्यविशालकेऽस्मिन् समुल्लसन्तं च जगद्वरेण्यम् । वन्दे महोदारतरस्वभावं घृष्णेश्वराख्यं शरणम् प्रपद्ये ॥ ज्योतिर्मयद्वादशलिङ्गकानां शिवात्मनां प्रोक्तमिदं क्रमेण । स्तोत्रं पठित्वा मनुजोऽतिभक्त्या फलं तदालोक्य निजं भजेच्च ॥	saurāṣṭradeśe viśade'tiramye jyotirmayaṁ candrakalāvataṁsam । bhaktipradānāya kr̥pāvatīrṇaṁ taṁ somanāthaṁ śaraṇaṁ prapadye ॥ śrīśailaśr̥ṅge vibudhātisaṅge tulādrituṅge'pi mudā vasantam । tamarjunaṁ mallikapūrvamekaṁ namāmi saṁsārasamudrasetum ॥ avantikāyāṁ vihitāvatāraṁ muktipradānāya ca sajjanānām । akālamr̥tyoḥ parirakṣaṇārthaṁ vande mahākālamahāsureśam ॥ kāverikānarmadayoḥ pavitre samāgame sajjanatāraṇāya । sadaivamāndhātr̥pure vasantamoṅkāramīśaṁ śivamekamīḍe ॥ pūrvottare prajvalikānidhāne sadā vasantaṁ girijāsametam । surāsurārādhitapādapadmaṁ śrīvaidyanāthaṁ tamahaṁ namāmi ॥ yāmye sadaṅge nagare'tiramye vibhūṣitāṅgaṁ vividhaiśca bhogaiḥ । sadbhaktimuktipradamīśamekaṁ śrīnāganāthaṁ śaraṇaṁ prapadye ॥ mahādripārśve ca taṭe ramantaṁ sampūjyamānaṁ satataṁ munīndraiḥ । surāsurairyakṣa mahoragāḍhyaiḥ kedāramīśaṁ śivamekamīḍe ॥ sahyādriśīrṣe vimale vasantaṁ godāvaritīrapavitradeśe । yaddharśanātpātakamāśu nāśaṁ prayāti taṁ tryambakamīśamīḍe ॥ sutāmraparṇījalarāśiyoge nibadhya setuṁ viśikhairasaṁkhyaiḥ । śrīrāmacandreṇa samarpitaṁ taṁ rāmeśvarākhyaṁ niyataṁ namāmi ॥ yaṁ ḍākiniśākinikāsamāje niṣevyamāṇaṁ piśitāśanaiśca । sadaiva bhīmādipadaprasiddaṁ taṁ śaṅkaraṁ bhaktahitaṁ namāmi ॥ sānandamānandavane vasantamānandakandaṁ hatapāpavr̥ndam । vārāṇasīnāthamanāthanāthaṁ śrīviśvanāthaṁ śaraṇaṁ prapadye ॥ ilāpure ramyaviśālake'smin samullasantaṁ ca jagadvareṇyam । vande mahodāratarasvabhāvaṁ ghr̥ṣṇeśvarākhyaṁ śaraṇam prapadye ॥ jyotirmayadvādaśaliṅgakānāṁ śivātmanāṁ proktamidaṁ krameṇa । stotraṁ paṭhitvā manujo'tibhaktyā phalaṁ tadālokya nijaṁ bhajecca ॥

All three temples are reluctant to relinquish their claim despite the ancient Stotram mentioned Shri Vaijnath Temple of parali Maharashtra Additionally, In January 2018, Government of Madhya Pradesh and the management committee of Mahakaleshwar Jyotirlinga organized a congregation of priests from all the 12 Jyotirlingas where the priests from Shri Vaijnath Temple was invited. The priest community of Deoghar took strong exception to this move and registered their protest with the Government of Madhya Pradesh and the management committee of Mahakaleshwar Jyotirlinga.
