= Bekal Gokulam Goushala =

Cattle shelter in Kasaragod

- Founded: 2010
- Founder: Vishnuprasad Hebbar, Nagaratna Hebbar
- Type: Goushala (cattle shelter)
- Location: Periya, near Bekal, Kasaragod district, Kerala, India
- Coordinates: 12.3952543°N 75.0841210°E

Bekal Gokulam Goushala is a cattle shelter known for housing native Indian cattle breeds, located at Periya, near Bekal in Kasaragod district, Kerala, India, close to the Central University of Kerala campus. Founded in 2010, it houses several hundred cattle of native Indian breeds and hosts two recurring annual classical arts festivals through its affiliated institution, Parampara Vidyapeetham.

== History ==
The goushala was founded in 2010 by Vishnuprasad Hebbar and Nagaratna Hebbar, beginning with a single Vechur cow and a bull. According to a 2025 feature, Vishnuprasad first began keeping a single Vechur cow in 2010, with the goushala formally established in 2015 starting with one shed. By 2023, a press report described 195 cattle housed across five cowsheds. By 2024, this had grown to 226 cows across nine Indian breeds, including Vechur, Kasaragod Dwarf, Bargur, Malanad Gidda, Ongole, Kankrej, Gir, and Kangayam. By early 2025, the goushala housed around 230 cattle across four cowsheds, sourced from six Indian states. By late 2025, press reports described the shelter as housing more than 250 cattle.

According to the founders, the goushala follows a practice of keeping bulls of the same breed as its cows in order to avoid cross-breeding and preserve original indigenous breeds. Nagaratna Hebbar has said her interest in cattle welfare developed in part through her family's association with the Ramachandrapura Mutt.

In 2021, the goushala established Parampara Vidyapeetham, an affiliated institution for instruction in Carnatic music, Hindustani music, and Indian classical dance. The goushala's cattle-rearing practices have also been featured on Doordarshan Malayalam's agricultural programme Krishidarshan and on Doordarshan Kasaragod.

Music was introduced at the goushala after some breeds, such as Kangayam cattle, proved difficult to calm; organisers began playing music for the animals, drawing on the traditional association between cattle and Krishna's flute. The goushala drew wider public attention after a video of calves joining vocalist Deepika Bhat on stage during a performance on 3 November 2021 went viral.

By September 2026, press reports described the shelter as housing 270 cattle.[11][12]

== Activities ==
=== Deepavali Sangeethotsavam ===
The goushala hosts an annual multi-day classical music festival around Diwali, organised under Parampara Vidyapeetham. The 2023 edition ran for ten days across five cowsheds. The 2024 edition featured more than 130 concerts over ten days across Carnatic, Hindustani, and fusion styles, with performers including ghatam artist Suresh Vaidyanathan. The 2025 edition, the fifth annual festival, ran for thirteen days, with approximately 400 artists performing, including Bharatanatyam exponent Padma Subrahmanyam, percussionist Sivamani, Carnatic vocalists T. V. Gopalakrishnan and Abhishek Raghuram, and playback singer Anoop Shankar.

=== Vaishakha Natanam ===
The goushala also hosts an annual classical dance festival, Vaishakha Natanam, held each year from 1 to 14 May. The 2026 edition was inaugurated with a dance performance by Padma Subrahmanyam, with performers including playback singer Vijay Prakash, Kathak duo Nirupama and Rajendra, and Bharatanatyam dancers Priyadarsini Govind, Meenakshi Chitharanjan, and Sindhu Shyam. The event was attended by Kasaragod Member of Parliament Rajmohan Unnithan.

In addition to the two annual festivals, the goushala hosts performances by emerging artists on several days each month. Performers are not paid, but the goushala provides food for visitors to its festivals.

== Founders ==
Vishnuprasad Hebbar is an astrologer associated with the goushala since its founding. Nagaratna Hebbar holds a PhD from the University of Cambridge, where her doctoral research examined a molecular mechanism relevant to breast cancer; the resulting paper was published in the journal Nature Chemistry in 2011.

== See also ==
- Goshala
- Indigenous cattle breeds of India
