= Pundlik (name) =

Pundlik can be a masculine given name or a surname. Notable people with the name include:

- Pundlik Hari Danve, Indian politician
- Vaijnath Mohiniraj Pundlik, Indian architect
