= Maa Simsa Temple =

Hindu temple in Himachal Pradesh, India

Coordinates: 31.902°N 76.698°E

Maa Simsa Mandir or Simsa Mata Mandir is a Hindu temple located in Ladbharol region of the Joginder Nagar subdivision of Mandi district of Himachal Pradesh, India. The temple is dedicated to Sharada Devi. While the main temple is located in the Simsa village, 30 km from the Baijnath town, 38 km from Joginder Nagar, and other one Simsa Mata temple in Daroh village, 17 km (10.56 miles) from Palampur.

== Navratri Special ==
During Navratri, many women with no children come here to seek the blessings of goddess Sharada Devi. It is believed that goddess gives those ladies babies in gift. According to the tradition, all these women sleep on the floor in the temple premises. It is believed that these ladies have a dream which tells them that their prayers have been accepted.
