= Simbal, Himachal Pradesh =

Simbal
- village
- Location in Himachal Pradesh, India Simbal (India)
- Coordinates: 32.05°N 76.65°E
- Country: India
- State: Himachal Pradesh
- District: Kangra
- Tehsil: Baijnath
- Elevation: 1,301 m (4,268 ft)

Languages
  - Official: Hindi
- Time zone: UTC+5:30 (IST)
- PIN: 176071
- Vehicle registration: HP-

Simbal is a village in Baijnath tehsil, Kangra District of Himachal Pradesh, India. It comes under Simbal panchayath. It is located 33 km to the east of the district headquarters Dharamshala and 141 km from the State capital Shimla.

== Geography ==
The village is located on the right bank of the river Binwa, a corrupt form of ancient Binduka, a tributary of the Beas River. The average elevation of the area is 1301 meters.
