= Ramgarh, Kaimur =

Ramgarh
- Census town
- Location in Bihar, India Ramgarh (India)
- Coordinates: 25.28893°N 83.65355°E
- Country: India
- State: Bihar
- District: Kaimur

Area
  - Total: 4.06 km^{2} (1.57 sq mi)
- Elevation: 75 m (246 ft)

Population (2011)
  - Total: 8,960
  - Density: 2,210/km^{2} (5,720/sq mi)

Languages
  - Official: Bhojpuri, Hindi
- Time zone: UTC+5:30 (IST)

Ramgarh is a census town and corresponding community development block in Kaimur district of Bihar, India. As of 2011, its population was 8,690, in 1,345 households. It was first upgraded to census town status for the 2011 census. The total population of the rural areas of Ramgarh block was 123,973, in 18,375 households. The overall population of the subdistrict was 132,663.

== Geography ==
Ramgarh block covers an area of 16,448 hectares, of which forests covered 3.2 in 2011. The area currently under cultivation that year was 13,249.7 hectares, while orchards covered another 284.8 hectares and pastures covered an additional 96.4. Another 1,726.1 hectares were under non-agricultural use.

== Climate ==
Ramgarh town gets about 1600 mm of rainfall per year on average. Temperatures typically vary from 6 to 45 degrees.

== Demographics ==
According to the 2011 census, the sex ratio of Ramgarh town was 927 females for every 1000 males, which was the highest among Kaimur district's three urban areas. Of the town's 8,690 people, 1,415 were between the ages of 0 and 6, and the sex ratio of this group was 1007 (i.e. there were more slightly girls than boys: 710 and 705, respectively). Members of scheduled castes made up 23.77% of Ramgarh residents, and there were no members of scheduled tribes living in the town. The literacy rate of Ramgarh town was 79.74%, which was lowest among urban areas in Kaimur district. Literacy was higher in men than in women: 87.96% of men and 70.73% of women in Kaimur town could read and write in 2011, with the corresponding 17.23% literacy gender gap being the highest in Kaimur.

Most of Ramgarh town's workforce was not employed in agriculture in 2011, with only 12.35% of workers being cultivators who owned or leased their own land, and 16.05% being agricultural labourers who worked someone else's land for money. Additionally, 8.51% were classified as household industry workers. Most workers (63.09%) were classified as other workers. The workforce was mostly male, with 1,827 male and 148 female workers in Ramgarh.

For rural areas of Ramgarh block, the sex ratio was 929; among 0-6 year olds, it was 926. Members of scheduled castes made up 22.62% of rural residents, and members of scheduled tribes made up 0.62%. The rural literacy rate was 72.29% (82.24% among men and 61.58% among women).

Most of Ramgarh block's rural workforce was employed in agriculture in 2011, with 30.26% being cultivators and another 49.75% being agricultural labourers. 5.52% were household industry workers, and the remaining 14.48% were other workers. The rural workforce was mostly male, consisting of 28,978 men and 11,926 women.

== Amenities ==
As of 2011, firefighting services in Ramgarh was covered by the Bhabua fire department. For electricity, Ramgarh had 495 households connected to the power grid that year, 0 commercial or industrial connections, and no electric street lights. Both open and closed were used Ramgarh, and there were 0 latrines.

== Villages ==
Besides the town of Ramgarh, there are 125 rural villages in Ramgarh block, as listed below:

Village name	Total land area (hectares)	Population (in 2011)
Bhatauni	149	2,172
Sangapur	128	964
Baijnath	231	2,482
Gogarhi	108	918
Bishunpura	62	386
Chhatarpura	36	1,423
Debahalia	191	3,967
Karari	24	0
Gadeya	38	0
Dharahara	52	0
Matiari	100	1,464
Bharheria	236	1,770
Kohraula	143	956
Labedaha	118	942
Chandarmanpur	26	6
Masarhi	149	3,207
Rewra	100	0
Mera	100	612
Labedahi	74	380
Narhan	247	2,849
Sumerpur Barka	41	0
Sumerpur Chotka	34	0
Sehuka	357	4,716
Bisrampur	44	0
Jamurna	127	2,108
Dahrak	299	3,805
Chakkupur	107	171
Mahuwar	424	3,701
Jangalchhera	342	0
Pachgain	74	962
Anantpura	86	274
Rupanandpur	53	365
Balha	170	0
Jangalchhera Sahodarpur	91	41
Jangalchhera Saray	88	0
Sarai	248	1,783
Toroiya	99	1,095
Jangalchhera Taraiya	80	0
Jangalchhera Imlia	134	0
Imlia	176	1,366
Jandaha Magrabi	65	491
Jangalchhera Magrabi	55	0
Jangalchhera Mashraki	59	0
Jandaha Mashraki	98	758
Nagaitha	67	0
Madanwan	44	0
Nonar	301	4,039
Jangalchhera Nonar	76	0
Ashaideh	113	486
Jangalchhera Bhargawan	62	0
Bhargawan	87	720
Bamhangawan	58	68
Piparia	108	530
Tilsara	35	155
Chhewari	161	2,041
Lasra	55	787
Khorahra	168	974
Abhaideh	111	930
Bishunpura	111	474
Gorsara	201	5,014
Bandipur	187	4,448
Akorhi	299	2,632
Isri	207	1,859
Jorar	227	1,665
Khanethi	104	560
Barbigha	21	0
Goria	59	30
Bharaula	78	130
Mohanpur Bharula	37	179
Balpur	16	303
Natwa	81	200
Baraura	276	4,571
Hamzapur	88	0
Kathidih	93	0
Narhan	206	435
Prainpur	66	0
Antdih	66	1,630
Lahang Patti	76	0
Sisaunra	323	3,587
Taiyan	110	621
Uprauli	140	943
Paikauli	309	2,094
Ahiwans	354	2,117
Bedaman Chak	164	1,313
Hajra	57	0
Upadhya Sagar	123	408
Sijhua	552	2,739
Kalani	197	3,172
Gaura	71	286
Thakura	431	3,093
Maheshpur	60	0
Senisaray	89	437
Kamsaray	69	18
Bairpur	86	0
Jalalpur	19	0
Bahpura	114	700
Kishunpura	148	881
Oriadih	92	688
Alipur	110	528
Tenua	84	930
Gorsara	49	2,646
Darwansurat	476	210
Judunandan Patti	40	43
Murlidarwan	86	1,218
Dhanautia	125	539
Asaura	324	1,514
Chitahan	75	391
Kanpura	34	259
Asapur	81	33
Chitahan	36	0
Patkhaulia	100	839
Tulshipur	35	0
Bagarhi	164	957
Kalyanpur	150	0
Banwari Chak	135	0
Nathua	27	164
Mahuari	156	1,902
Gogasaray	45	0
Upari	206	2,152
Baluwa	97	291
Lachhanpura	42	40
Sultanpur	121	771
Siktha	135	0
Sadullahpur	305	4,455
Ansi	24	0

== See also ==
- Ramgarh, Kaimur (Vidhan Sabha constituency)
