= Kalyanasundara =

Iconographical depiction of the wedding of the Hindu deities Shiva and Parvati

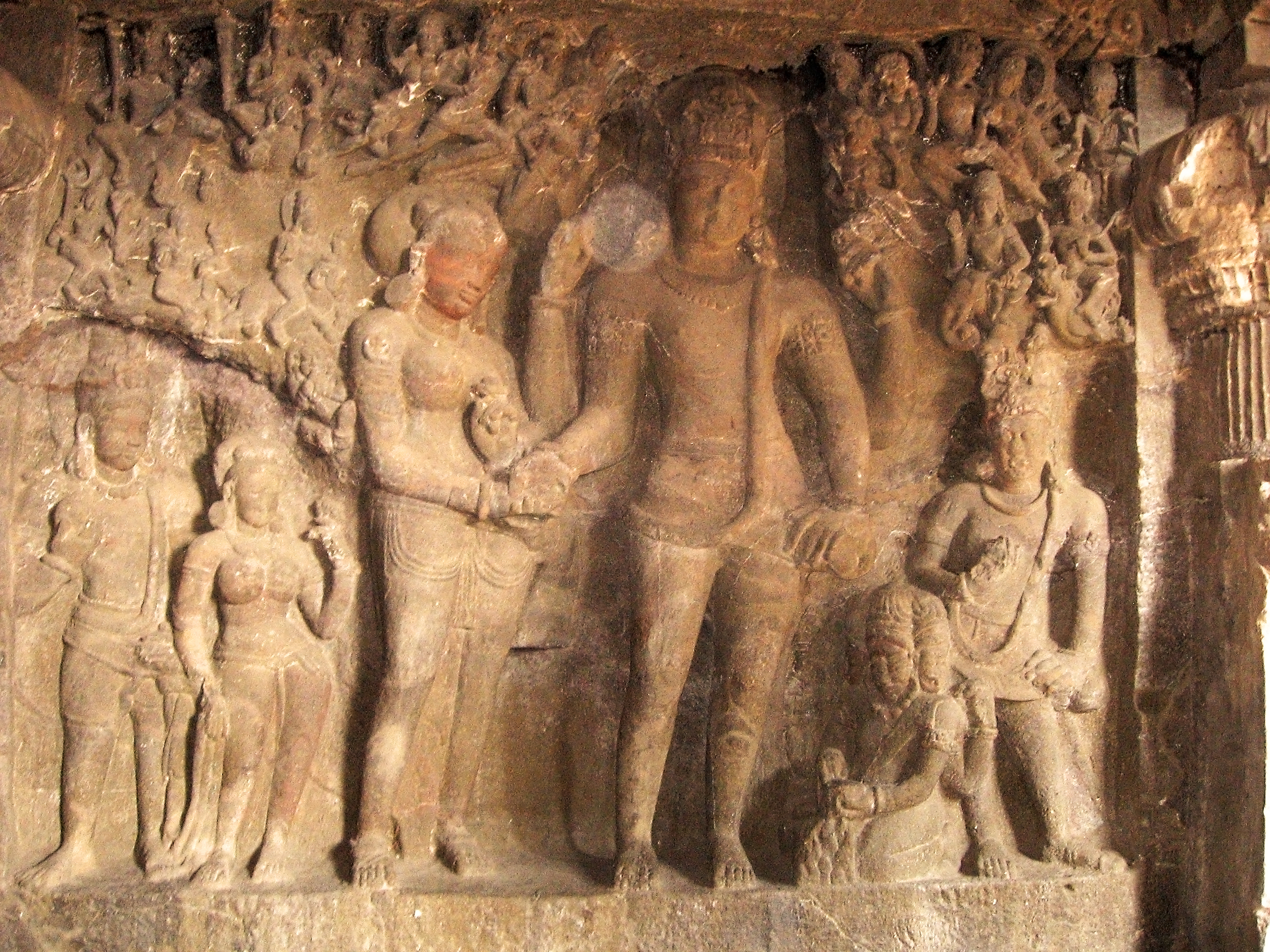
Depiction of Kalyanasundara, Ellora caves.

Kalyanasundara (कल्याणसुन्दर, literally "beautiful wedding"), also spelt as Kalyansundar and Kalyana Sundara, and known as Kalyanasundara-murti ("icon of the beautiful wedding"), Vaivahika-murti (वैवाहिक-मूर्ति, "nuptial icon") and Panigrahana-murti ( पाणिंग्रहण-मूर्ति) ("icon related to panigrahana ritual"), is the iconographical depiction of the wedding of the Hindu deities Shiva and Parvati. The couple are often depicted performing the panigrahana ("accepting the hand") ritual of a Hindu wedding, where the groom accepts the bride by taking her right hand in his.

The couple, depicted in the centre, are accompanied by a host of divinities and other celestial beings. The god Vishnu and his wife Lakshmi are often pictured as giving away Parvati to Shiva. The god Brahma is shown as the officiating priest.

The Kalyanasundara icon is not the object of popular worship and is usually used only in the celebrations of the divine wedding in annual temple festivals. However, Kalyanasundara scenes are found across India in caves, sculptures and on temple walls.

== Legend ==
Various Hindu scriptures narrate the story of the union of Shiva and Parvati, with some variation. After the death of his first wife Sati, Shiva withdrew from society and engrossed himself in deep meditation. Taking advantage of the situation, the asura (demon) king Tarakasura secured from the god Brahma the boon that he could be killed only by the son of Shiva. Believing himself effectively immortal, Tarakasura terrorized the beings of the universe and defeated the gods. Meanwhile, Parvati, the reincarnation of Sati, was born to Himavan, the god of the Himalayas and his wife the apsara Mena. She underwent severe austerities to compel Shiva to marry her. The gods, desperate to hasten the birth of Shiva's son, sent Kamadeva, the god of love, to disturb Shiva's meditation. Though Shiva was awakened, Kamadeva was burnt up by Shiva's fury. Implored by the other gods to marry, Shiva agreed, but decided to test Parvati's devotion first. The Saptarishi (the seven sages) approached Parvati and mocked Shiva to dissuade her; however Parvati remained resolute. Then Shiva himself, disguised as an old ascetic, visited Parvati and vilified himself in her presence. As an angry Parvati was about to leave, Shiva revealed his true form to her and promised to marry her, pleased with her love and devotion. The couple married and produced a son, Kartikeya, who subsequently slew Tarakasura.

== Iconography ==
=== Textual descriptions ===
The Agamic texts like the Amsumadbhedagama, the Uttara-kamaikagama and the Purva-Karanagama prescribe the iconography of the Kalyanasunadara icon.

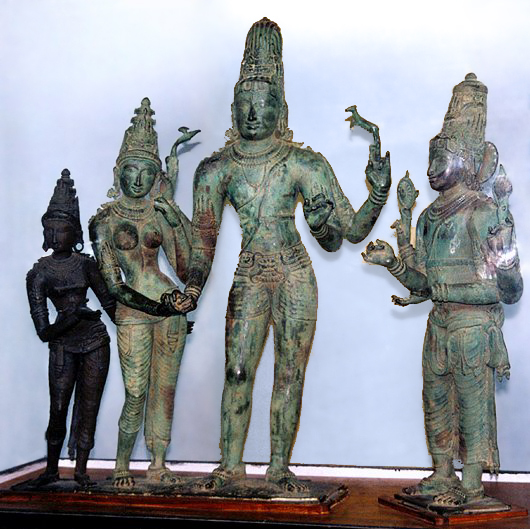
A Chola Kalyanasundara bronze: (from left) Lakshmi, Parvati, Shiva and Vishnu.

A young four-armed Shiva and a beautiful two-armed Parvati should be the central figures, performing the panigrahana ("accepting the hand") ritual of a Hindu wedding, where the groom accepts the bride by taking her right hand in his. Shiva stands in tribhanga posture, with one of his legs straight and firmly on the ground and the other one slightly bent. Shiva wears a jata-mukuta (a headdress formed of piled, matted hair) on his head, adorned with a crescent moon. He wears serpents as earrings, as a waist band and as a necklace. Various gold ornaments adorn his body. His back hands carry a parashu (axe) and a mriga (deer). His front left hand makes the varada mudra ("blessing-giving gesture") and his front right hand is stretched ahead to receive the hand of the bride. A dark-complexioned Parvati, adorned in silk and gold finery, stands to the left of Shiva, blushing with her head bent slightly as she extends her right arm to hold Shiva's right hand. She holds a nilotpala (blue lotus) in her left arm.

The god Vishnu and his consorts Lakshmi and Bhudevi should be represented as taking the place of Parvati's parents in the ceremony. The four-armed Vishnu should be shown in the background in between Shiva and Parvati; in one of his front hands is a golden pot from which he pours water over the hands of the couple, symbolising giving away the bride to the groom. He holds his usual attributes, the Sudarshana Chakra (discus) and the Panchajanya (conch), in his back arms. Vishnu's wives, dressed in royal finery, stand behind Parvati and hold her waist, symbolising the handing over.

The four-headed god Brahma should be shown seated on the ground in the foreground officiating as the wedding priest and making offerings to the homa (sacred fire) in the kunda (fire-altar). The four-armed god holds a sruka and sruva (sacrificial ladle and spoon) in his front arms and a kamandalu (water-pot) and akshamala (rosary) in his back arms. The presence of the fire also indicates another important ritual of the Hindu wedding, saptapadi ("seven steps") where the bride and groom go around the fire seven times.

The figure of Shiva should be tallest, followed by that of Vishnu, Parvati and Vishnu's wives. Various deities like the eight guardians of the directions, the eight Vasus, the seven Matrika goddesses, celestial beings such as yakshas and gandharvas, sages and siddhas may be depicted standing with folded arms in the background.

=== Depictions ===
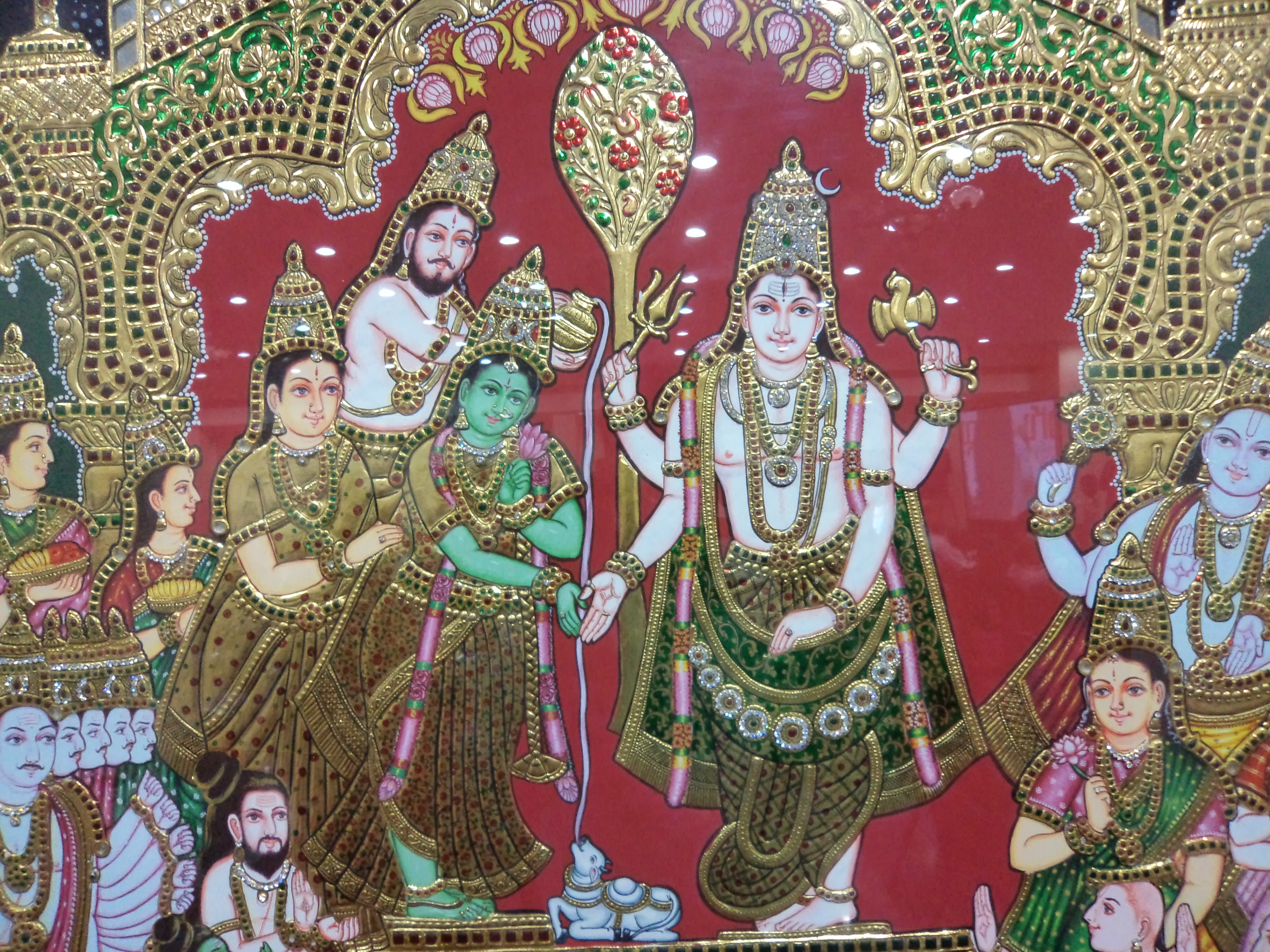
A complete Kalyanasundara scene where Parvati's parents are giving her away as Vishnu and Lakshmi (extreme right) look on.

The complete scene of the wedding is not always depicted. Sometimes, only the principal participants are shown. Chola bronzes featuring only Shiva and Parvati as described in the wedding scene are found. South Indian sculptures, like those from Madurai, feature only the couple and Vishnu. In this configuration, Parvati is depicted in the centre, with her brother Vishnu on the left, giving away her hand to Shiva on the right. Sometimes as in the Elephanta Caves, Parvati's biological father Himavan, instead of Vishnu, is depicted giving away his daughter to Shiva.

Other deviations from the texts may appear in the attributes held by the divine couple. Parvati may hold a mirror, instead of the lotus. Shiva may be shown holding the trishula (trident) and damaru (drum) in his back hands. Regional variations in iconography may also occur. In Bengal, Shiva holds a karttari (knife), the ceremonial weapon that a Hindu groom from Bengal is expected to carry in a wedding.

Various wedding guests are depicted in the scene. Shiva's attendant ganas enjoy the festivities; playing drums or dancing. The vahanas (mounts) of the couple, Shiva's bull Nandi and Parvati's lion, are sometimes pictured in the scene. In vertical panel depictions, the celestial guests are often shown flying over Shiva and Parvati. While the gods are pictured flying on their respective vahanas (e.g. Indra on his elephant, Agni on a ram) and with their consorts; semi-divine beings like Vidyadharas fly without vehicles. An anachronism found in a few Kalyanasundara scenes is the presence of the yet-unborn children of Shiva and Parvati, Ganesha and Kartikeya. Examples of this anachronism are found at the Rameshvara Cave of Ellora, and in a 9th-century sculpture from Uttar Pradesh now housed in Los Angeles County Museum of Art.

== Worship ==
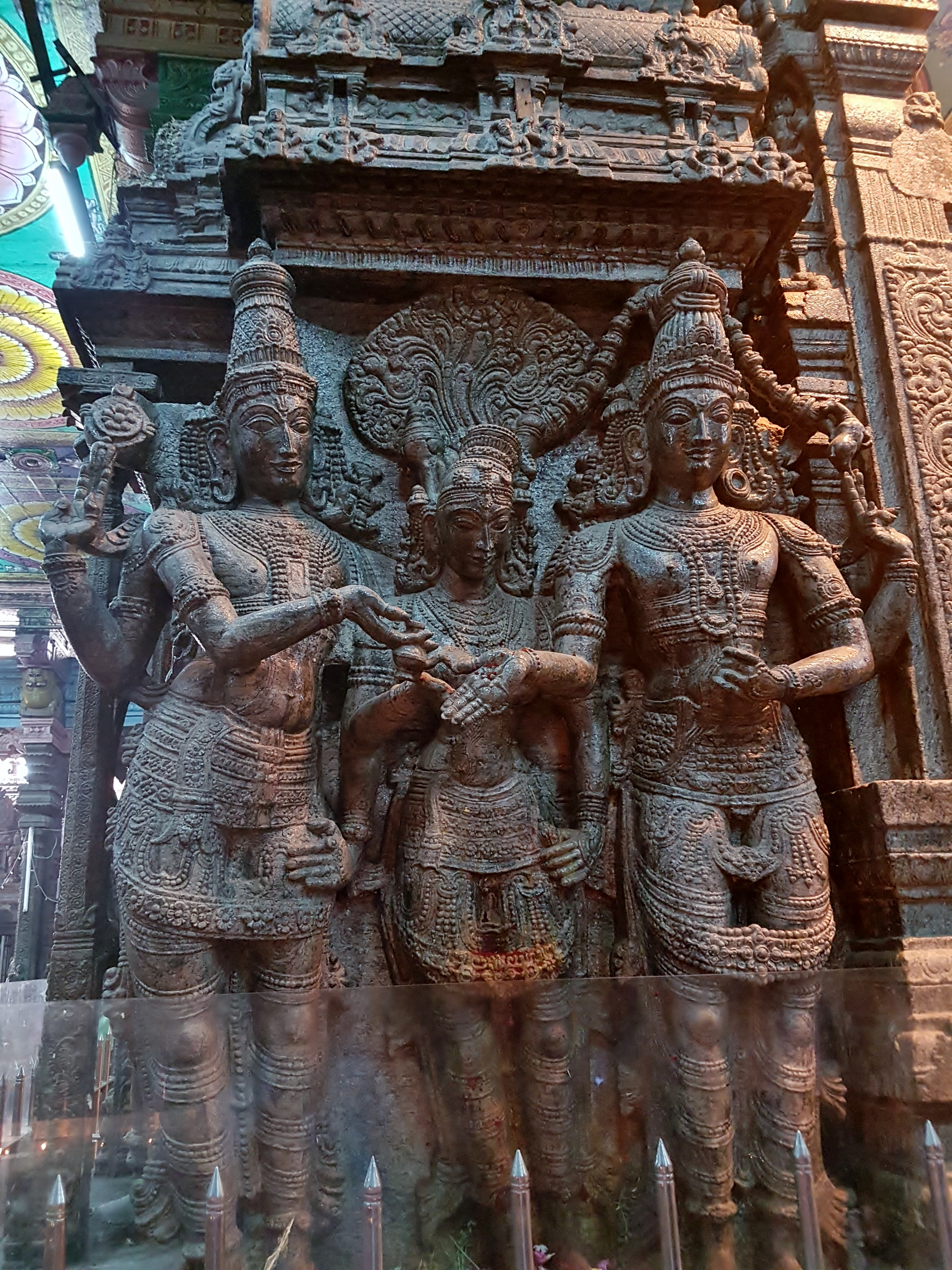
The Kalyanasundara scena at the Meenakshi temple with Vishnu, Parvati as Meenakshi and Shiva (left to right).

Though Kalyanasundara icons are found across India in caves, sculptures and temple walls, no sect is centred on their worship. The icon is a popular feature on temple gopurams (temple towers).

In South Indian Shiva temples like those in Tiruvenkadu and Chidambaram, the bronze Kalyanasundara images of Shiva and Parvati are used in annual temple festivals to commemorate the divine union. Special halls are reserved for the annual ceremonial wedding of the deities. The Kalyanasundara bronzes are used only in this festival and kept unused the rest of the year.

At the Meenakshi Amman Temple, women worship the Kalyanasundara sculpture to find husbands.

Idol depicting Kalyanasundara is present in Baijnath Temple, in Kangra, Himachal Pradesh.

== See also ==
- Somaskanda
