= Parli Thermal Power Station =

Power plant in Beed district of Maharashtra, India

Parali Thermal Power Station
- Country: India
- Location: Parali, Beed, Maharashtra
- Coordinates: 18.868768°N 76.526127°E
- Status: Operational
- Commission date: 1971
- Operator: Maharashtra State Power Generation Company (Mahagenco)

Thermal power station
- Primary fuel: Coal

Power generation
- Units operational: 6
- Nameplate capacity: 1380.00 MW

External links
- Website: mahagenco.in

Parali Thermal Power Plant is located at Parali Vaijnath in Beed district of Maharashtra. It is one of the coal based power plants of Maharashtra State Power Generation Company (Mahagenco).

== Installed capacity ==
Stage	Unit number	Installed capacity (MW)	Date of commissioning	Status
Stage I	1	30	1970 August	Abandoned
Stage I	2	30	1971 March	Abandoned
Stage II	3	210	1979 April	Abandoned
Stage II	4	210	1980 July	Abandoned
Stage II	5	210	1981 January	Abandoned
Stage III	6	250	2007	Running
Stage III	7	250	2010	Running
Stage IV	8	250	2016	Running
