= Ganesh Vaidyanathan =

Ganesh Vaidyanathan (born 23 April 1956) is the Professor of Decision Sciences in the Heller College of Business at the Roosevelt University. He was the Associate Dean and the Director of Graduate Programs at the Heller College of Business. He was the Professor of Decision Systems in the Judd Leighton School of Business and Economics, Indiana University South Bend. He served as the Chair of the Decision Sciences and the Director of the Master of Science in MIS (MS-MIT) program. He also directed the Center of Experiential Education. He earned his MBA (1998) from the University of Chicago and his doctoral degree (1989) in Artificial Intelligence from Tulane University.

== Research career ==
Ganesh Vaidyanathan has made significant research contributions to Operations Management and e-Commerce, seeking to advance their interfaces in corporations. He holds patents in Artificial Intelligence and has authored more than 60 publications and book chapters in operations management, information systems, and project management areas in journals such as Journal of Operations Management, Communications of the ACM, and Decision Sciences. His book, “Project Management: Process, Technology and Practice”, published by Kendall Hunt Publishers, has been adopted as textbook in many universities. His second book, “Operations and Supply Chain Management” is to be published in 2023.

== Authored Books ==
- Operations & Supply Chain Management, Kendall Hunt Publishers, Dubuque, Iowa, 2023.
- Project Management: Process, Technology and Practice, Kendall Hunt Publishers, Dubuque, Iowa, 2022.
- Project Management: Process, Technology, and Practice, Pearson, Upper Saddle River, N.J., 2012.

== Selected publications ==
- Capability Hierarchy in Electronic Procurement and Procurement Process Performance: An empirical Analysis. Journal of Operations Management, 31(6), 2013, 376-390.
- Effect of Purchase Volume Flexibility and Purchase Mix Flexibility on E-procurement Performance: An Analysis of Two Perspectives. Journal of Operations Management, 30(7-8), 2012, 509-520.
- Does Security Impact E-Procurement Performance? Testing a Model of Direct and Moderated Effects. Decision Sciences, 43(3), 2012, 437-458.
- Security in Web Content Management Systems Applications: A Framework Based Evaluation. Communications of the ACM, 52(12), 2009,1-6.
- The Role of Quality in e-Procurement Information, Fulfillment and Performance: An empirical Analysis. Journal of Operations Management, 26(3), 2008, 407-425.
- A framework for evaluating third-party logistics. Communications of the ACM, 48(1), 2005, 89-94.
- A five factor framework for analyzing online risks in e-business. Communications of the ACM, 46(12), 2003, 354-361.
