= L. V. Vaidyanathan =

Indian soil scientist (1928)

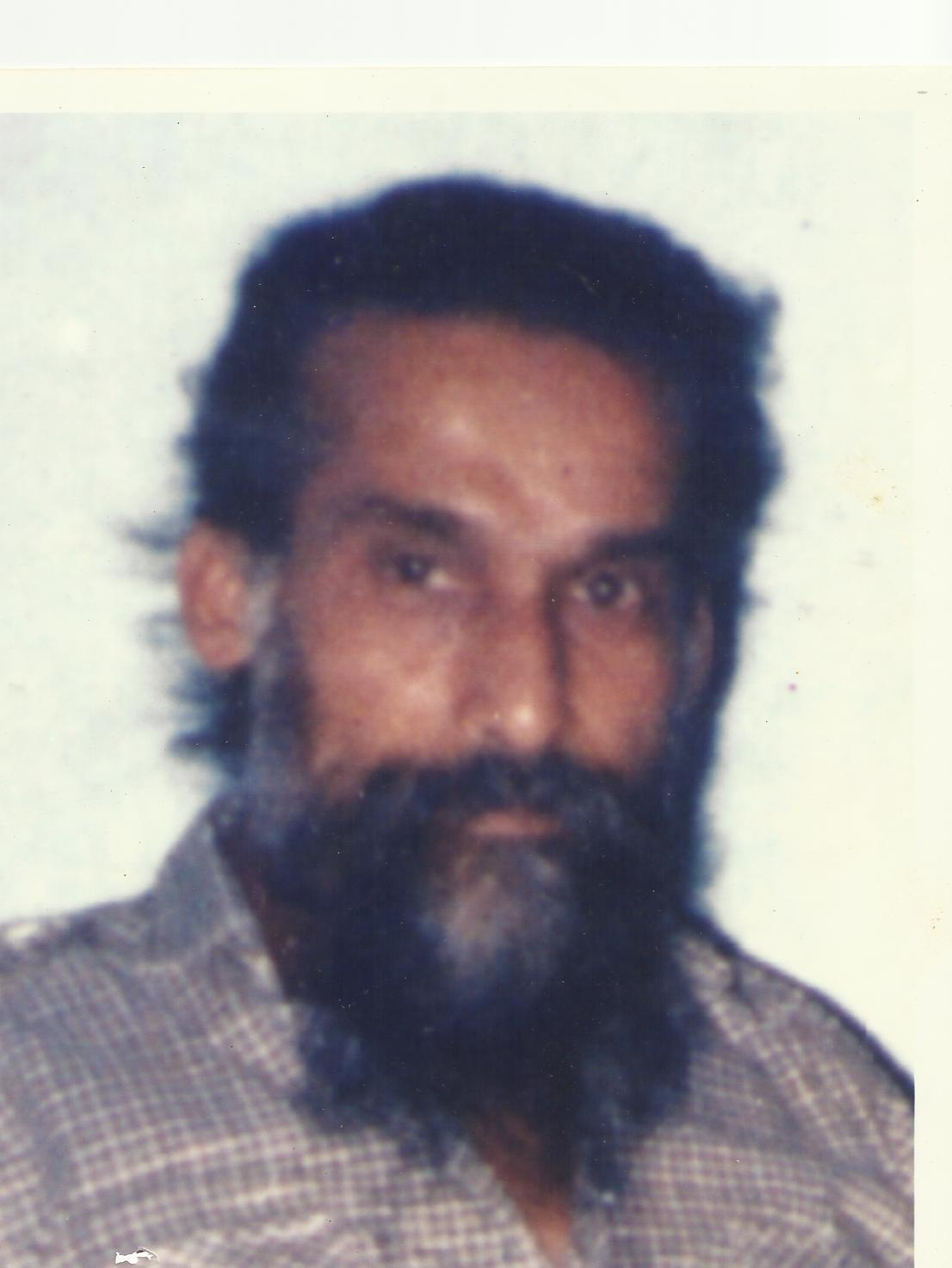
- Born: 31 May 1928; Palakkad, Kerala, India
- Education: Government Victoria College, Palakkad
- Known for: Contributions to soil science
- Scientific career
- Fields: Soil science
- Workplaces: Agricultural Development and Advisory Service, Coffee Board of India, St. Mary's College, Thrissur
- Doctoral advisor: O. Talibudeen

L. V. Vaidyanathan ("Vaidy", 31 May 1928 - 13 November 2000) was a soil scientist.

He obtained a first class degree from Government Victoria College, Palakkad, and then spent three years lecturing in chemistry at St. Mary's College, Thrissur, before joining the India Coffee Board at their Central Coffee Research Institute as an advisor. He had also training association with Central Food Technology Research Institute (CFTRI), Council of Scientific & Industrial Research (CSIR) and Indian Council of Agricultural Research (ICAR). He went to England in 1959 to take up a postgraduate studentship at Rothamsted Experimental Station and obtained a PhD on soil phosphorus under the supervision of O. Talibudeen. He also had a brief stint at the Isotope School, UKAERE, Wantage. He then joined P. Nye at Oxford to work on ion diffusion in soils. He did research and teaching at Soil Science Section of the School of Agriculture, University of Oxford. He was also a guest worker at the EURATOM-ITAL, Wageningen, Netherlands. He also worked for a year as a consultant at the Seibersdorf Laboratory of the FAO-IAEA Joint Division for Agriculture, Vienna, Austria with responsibility for training of scientists from member countries in isotopic trace use. This included teaching assignments at the University of Tehran. He returned to the United Kingdom in 1970 to join the Agricultural Development and Advisory Service (ADAS). He was the Secretary of ADAS social science pollution and waste products committee and was the National Specialist in Soil Crop Water relationship. He was a visiting professor in the Department of Biological and Chemical Sciences, University of Essex and in the Chemistry of Soil Colloids Group, School of Chemistry, University of Birmingham.

After retirement from the ADAS, he served as an honorary research professor at the University of Birmingham where he died on 13 November 2000.

== Publications ==
- The supply of nutrient ions by diffusion to plant roots in soil
- Modelling and measurement of the effects of fertilizer‐N and crop residue incorporation on N‐dynamics in vegetable cropping
