= Sunil Tagare =

Sunil "Neil" Tagare (born c. 1962) is an entrepreneur. He developed the concept of the Fiber-Optic Link Around the Globe (FLAG) project in 1989 when he was 27 years old. FLAG was the first privately financed submarine fiber optic cable to link several continents around the world. The cost of construction of the first phase was $1.5 billion. As the executive vice president of Marketing and Business Development at NYNEX (now Verizon), Tagare was responsible for breaking through regulatory barriers in some of the most difficult countries in the world such as Spain, Italy, Egypt, India, Saudi Arabia, China, Hong Kong, Korea and Japan. FLAG was featured in the Guinness Book of World Records as the longest telephone cable in the world and has been instrumental in lowering the cost of international calls to countries like India by an order of magnitude that facilitated the creation of new industries like offshore call centers.

Tagare went on to found a second submarine fiber optics company called Project Oxygen Ltd. In 1997 where he was the chairman and CEO. Its launch was attended by 300 telecom service providers from 200 countries. It was selected as one of the 12 "Cool Companies" by "Fortune Magazine" and is widely believed to be one of the key contributors towards significant decrease in the cost of global bandwidth.

Tagare was selected by Wired magazine as one of the "Wired 25" in 1999 (25 people trying to achieve the impossible and change the world) and was a finalist as the Entrepreneur of the Year at the World Communications Awards event in Geneva.
