= Vaijnath Mohiniraj Pundlik =

Vaijnath Pundlik
- Born: 23 December 1913; Parli Vaijnath, State of Hyderabad, British India
- Died: 9 March 2009; Pune, Maharashtra, India
- Occupation: Architect
- Practice: Central Public Work Department, Delhi
- Buildings: Indian Parliament
- Projects: Income tax offices at Bihar, Punjab, Kashmir, Madhya Pradesh, Bangal, Uttar Pradesh

Vaijnath Mohiniraj Pundlik (23 December 1913 – 9 March 2009) was an Indian architect, considered an important figure of South Asian architecture and noted for his contributions to the evolution of architectural discourse in India. He is known for his contributions to the architecture of Indian Parliament at Delhi.

== Early life ==
Vaijnath Mohiniraj Pundlik was born in Parli Vaijnath, India. His father was working in postal and telegram department. His father had a transferable job and had service at many places in Maharashtra. Vaijnath Mohiniraj Pundlik studied his schooling at Pandharpur and Parbhani. At that time, Parbhani was in Nizam territory. Learning of Urdu language was mandatory in the schools at Parbhani. He studied at Kalabhavan College and the J. J. School of Architecture, Mumbai. He completed {Intermediate Architect at Kalabhavan College and Advance Diploma at J. J. School of Architecture.

== Career ==
He started his career at Suvarnapathaki and Sons as Draftsman in 1934. He migrated to Delhi and joined at "Delhi Improvements". Later he joined "Central Public Work Department" as senior draftsman in 1938. He has done number of architectures in Delhi during his service.

== Works ==
- Architecture of Indian Parliament for the capacity for 500 from 148 on request of Ganesh Vasudev Mavlankar, the first Speaker of the Lok Sabha. This arrangement is still being used after 60 years.
- Ashok Statue near Rashtrapati Bhavan
- Central Excise department building
- Income tax office in Delhi
- Income tax offices at Bihar, Punjab, Kashmir, Madhya Pradesh, Bangal, Uttar Pradesh

== Exercise and Parvati Hill Climbing ==
He had built his body during schooling and was climbing Parvati hill for more than 25 years everyday till the age of 93 from year 1973 after retirement from government service.

== Awards and recognition ==
He was rewarded in Pune in 2003

== Death ==
He died on 9 March 2009 at Pune
