= Sunil Vaidyanathan =

Indian writer (born 1976)

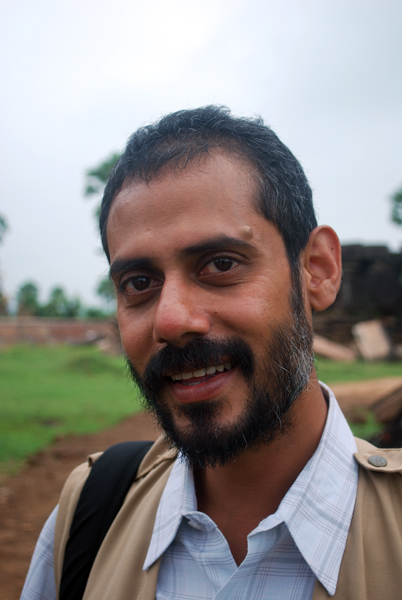
- Sunil Vaidyanathan
- Born: 1976 (age 49–50)
- Occupations: photographer, photojournalist

Sunil Vaidyanathan is an author, photojournalist and environmentalist who has nine books on photography, architecture and travel to his credit. His latest book ‘Rivers of India’, explores the symbiosis between the major rivers of India and the people who live along them.

== Some of his published books include ==
- Heritage Buildings of Bombay (1998, English Edition Publishers)
- Temples of South India (2000, English Edition Publishers)
- Ganesha - The God of India (2003, English Edition Publishers)
- Colourful India (2005, English Edition Publishers)
- Pilgrimage Places in India (2006, Magna Books)
- Portrait of Kerala [Principal Photographer] (2007, New Holland, London)
- Portrait of Rajasthan [Contributing Photographer] (2007, New Holland, London)
- A guide to the National Capital Region NCR (2008, Eicher Good Earth Ltd)
- Rivers of India (2011, Niyogi Books)
