= Shri Vaijnath Temple =

Hindu Shiva temple in Parli Vaijnath, Maharashtra, India

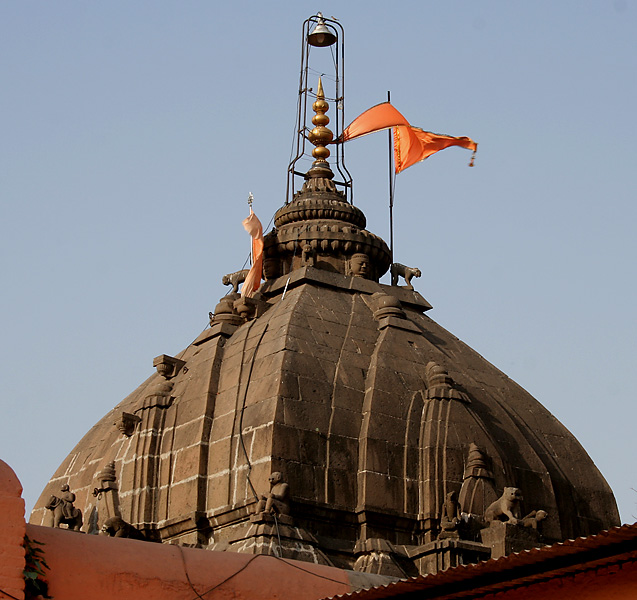

- Location in Maharashtra

Religion
- Affiliation: Hinduism
- District: Beed
- Deity: Shiva
- Festival: Mahashivratri
- Governing body: Vaijnath Devasthan Trust

Location
- Location: Parli Vaijnath
- State: Maharashtra
- Country: India
- Coordinates: 18°50′33.98″N 76°32′7.42″E

Architecture
- Type: Hemadpanthi
- Creator: Unknown; 18th Century - by Maharani Ahilyabai Holkar

Website
- https://www.vaijnathjyotirling.com/

Shri Vaidyanatha Temple (Marathi श्री वैजनाथ मंदिर ) is a temple to Shiva in Parli Vaijnath in the Beed district of Maharashtra, India.

While performing the rite of Abhishekam male devotees are not allowed to wear clothes above the waist. It's the 5th Jyotirlinga among 12 jyotirlinga of lord Shiva.

== Architecture ==
The temple is approximately 75–80 feet high. The main entrance is a brass-plated door at the east. The temple was renovated in 1706.

== Connectivity ==
- Nearest city: Parli Vaijnath, a major religious and commercial centre in the region.
- Nearest railway station: Parli Vaijnath railway station, with regular services to Mumbai, Hyderabad, Nagpur, and other cities.
- Nearest airport: Nanded Airport, approximately 130 km away, offering regional air services.
- Highways: The town lies on National Highway 161, providing road connectivity to Hingoli, Parbhani, and Nanded.

== Other Jyotirlinga In Maharashtra ==
- Jyotirlinga
- Grishneshwar Temple
- Trimbakeshwar Shiva Temple
- Bhimashankar Temple
- Aundha Nagnath
