= Suresh Vaidyanathan =

Suresh Vaidyanathan (born 1966) is a performing artist on the ghatam, an Indian classical claypot instrument. Ghatam Suresh, as he is known by the Indian diaspora, has provided accompaniment to legendary Carnatic and Hindustani artists. He is one of the more notable performers in Indian percussion.

== Awards ==
Suresh Vaidyanathan has received several awards and titles, including:

- "Asthana vidwan of Sri Kanchi Kamakoti Peetham"
- "Asthana vidwan of Sri Ahobhila mutt"
- "Asthana vidwan of Sri Datta Avadootha Peetham, Mysore"
- "Layavadya Sironmani"
- "Laya Sevabhimani"
- "Laya vadya Chatura"
- "Nada oli"
- "Gandharva Gana Ratna"
