= Baijnath Temple =

Hindu temple in Himachal Pradesh, India

- बैजनाथ मंदिर
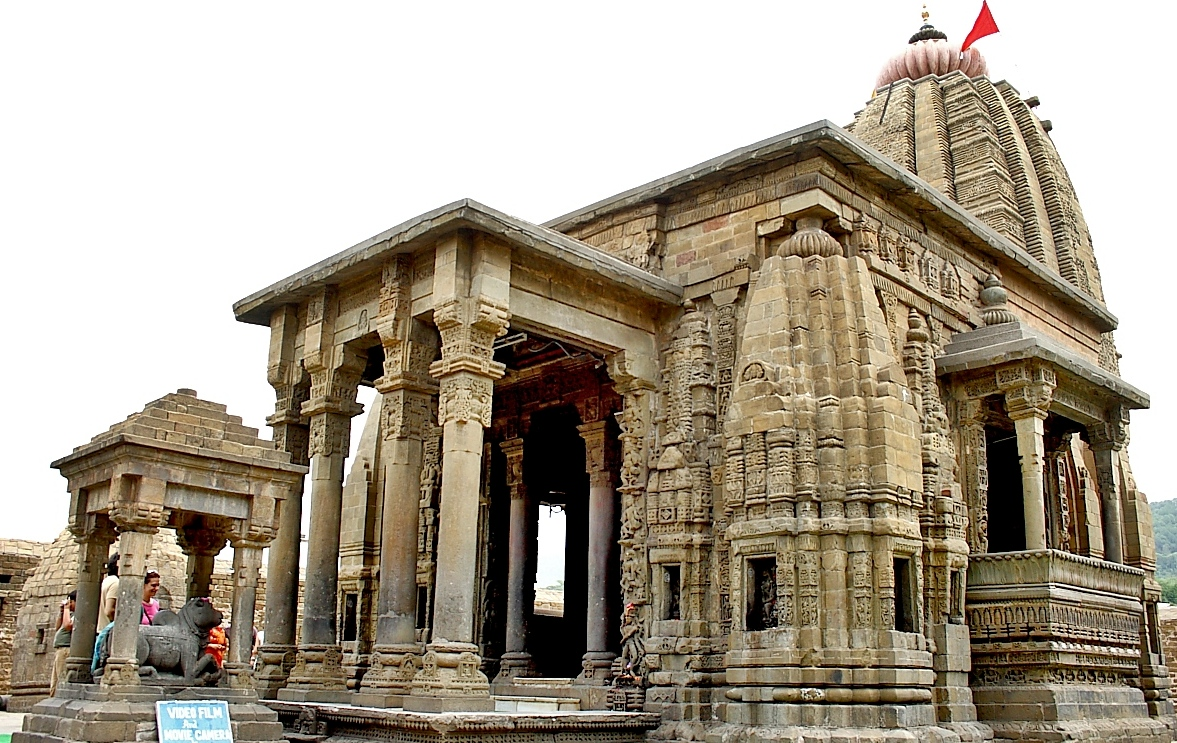

- Location in Himachal Pradesh

Religion
- Affiliation: Hinduism
- District: Kangra
- Deity: Lord Shiva as Vaidyanath
- Festivals: Maha Shivaratri, Makar Sankranti, Vaisakha Sankranti

Location
- State: Himachal Pradesh
- Country: India
- Coordinates: 32°05′01″N 76°57′59″E

Architecture
- Type: Nagara Style
- Creator: Ahuka and Manyuka

Website
- https://bababaijnath.in/

Baijnath Temple (Devanagari: बैजनाथ मंदिर) is a Nagara style Hindu temple situated in a small town of Baijnath located in Kangra District, Himachal Pradesh, India, and was built in 1204 AD by two local merchants named Ahuka and Manyuka. It is dedicated to Shiva as Vaidyanath (Devanagari: वैद्यनाथ), meaning ‘the lord of physicians’. The temple is protected and conserved by the Archaeological Survey of India (ASI).

== History ==
According to the inscriptions on the present day Baijnath temple structure, a temple of Shiva had existed before construction of present-day structure. The inner sanctum houses a Shiva lingam. Further images are carved in the walls and in niches on the exterior.

In 1786, ruler Sansar Chand took control of the Kangra Fort and he undertook the renovation and restoration of the temple. An inscription in the temple mentions that the family priest of Sansar Chand named Ganga Ram led the repair works of the temple, which involved reconstructing the spire of the shrine and the outer roof.

The 1905 earthquake created massive destruction in the Kangra valley. The temple survived the earthquake with minor damages; the smaller temples of Jamadagni, Bhairava, Narmadeshwar, and Murlimanohar situated within the temple yard and the roof of the main temple sustained some damages.

=== Dussehra ===
The festival of Dussehra is not celebrated at the Baijnath temple. Legends in the Puranas say that once king Ravana was worshipping lord Shiva in Kailash, and sacrificed his ten heads to be bestowed with invincible powers. With his wishes granted, Ravana requested lord Shiva to come along with him to Lanka. He transformed into a shivling and asked Ravana to carry the shivling without placing it in the ground. When Ravana reached Baijnath, then known as Kiragrama, he placed the shivling on the ground to quench his thirst, and the shivling settled there in the form of Ardhanarishwar. To respect Ravana's devotion to lord Shiva, Dussehra has never been celebrated in Baijnath temple.

== Archaeology ==
Two long inscriptions are engraved on stone slabs in the main hall. These inscriptions are in Sanskrit written using Sharada script and local Pahari language in Takri script. These inscriptions provide details about the construction of the temple by the merchants Manyuka and Ahuka in Indian national calendar (Saka) in 8th century. These inscriptions besides praising Shiva, name the current ruler king Jaya Chandra, list of the names of the architects and the names of donor merchants at time of construction. Another inscription names Kangra district's old name, that is, Nagarakot, the district in which the temple is built.

== Sculptures ==
Numerous idols are carved on the walls of the temple. Some of them dating prior to the present temple was built. Idols include: Ganesha, Harihara (half Vishnu and half Shiva), Kalyanasundara (wedding of the Shiva and Parvati) and the defeat of asura Andhaka by Shiva.

== Travel ==
Baijnath temple is reachable by bus, train, and flight. It lies between Kangra and Mandi, on the Pathankot - Manali National Highway No. 154. The nearest airport is the Gaggal airport in Dharamshala. The nearest railway station is at Paprola, which is connected with Pathankot through a narrow gauge line, and the Amb Andaura station, which is connected through a broad gauge line. Nearest towns are Dharamshala, Palampur, Bir, and Pathankot from where taxis and buses ply daily on the Baijnath route.

== Gallery ==
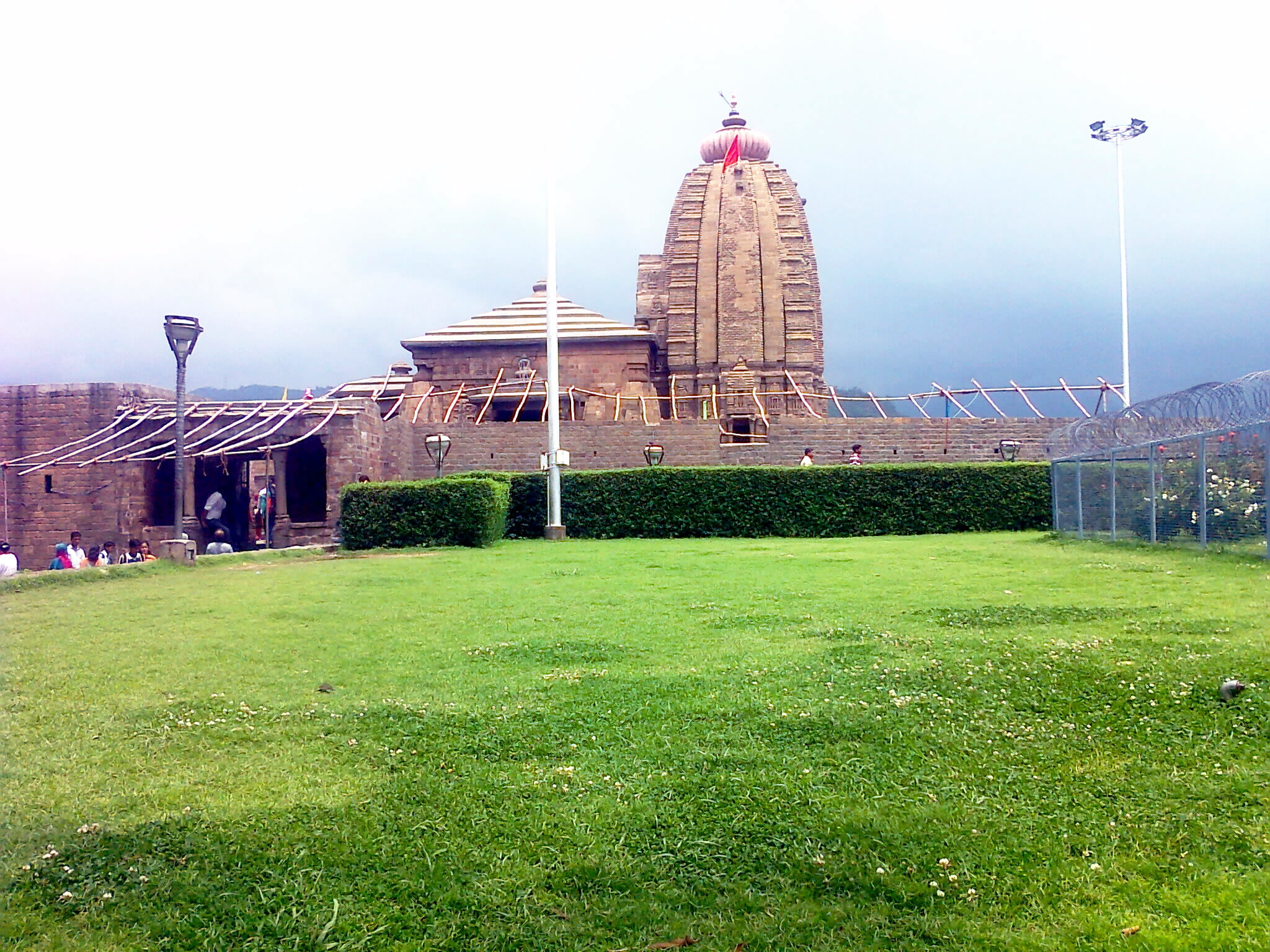
Garden and Entrance

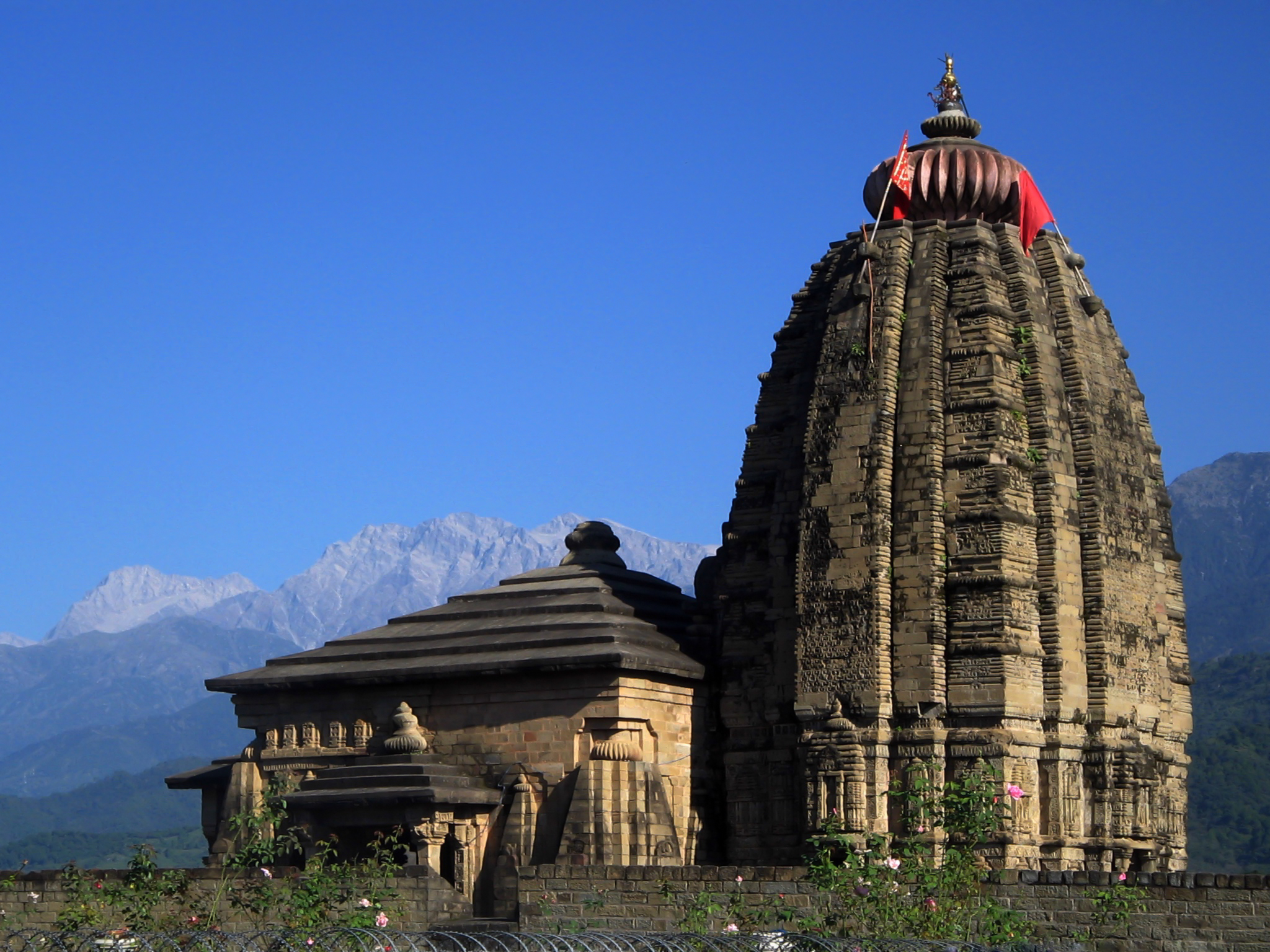
Closer look of the dome of temple

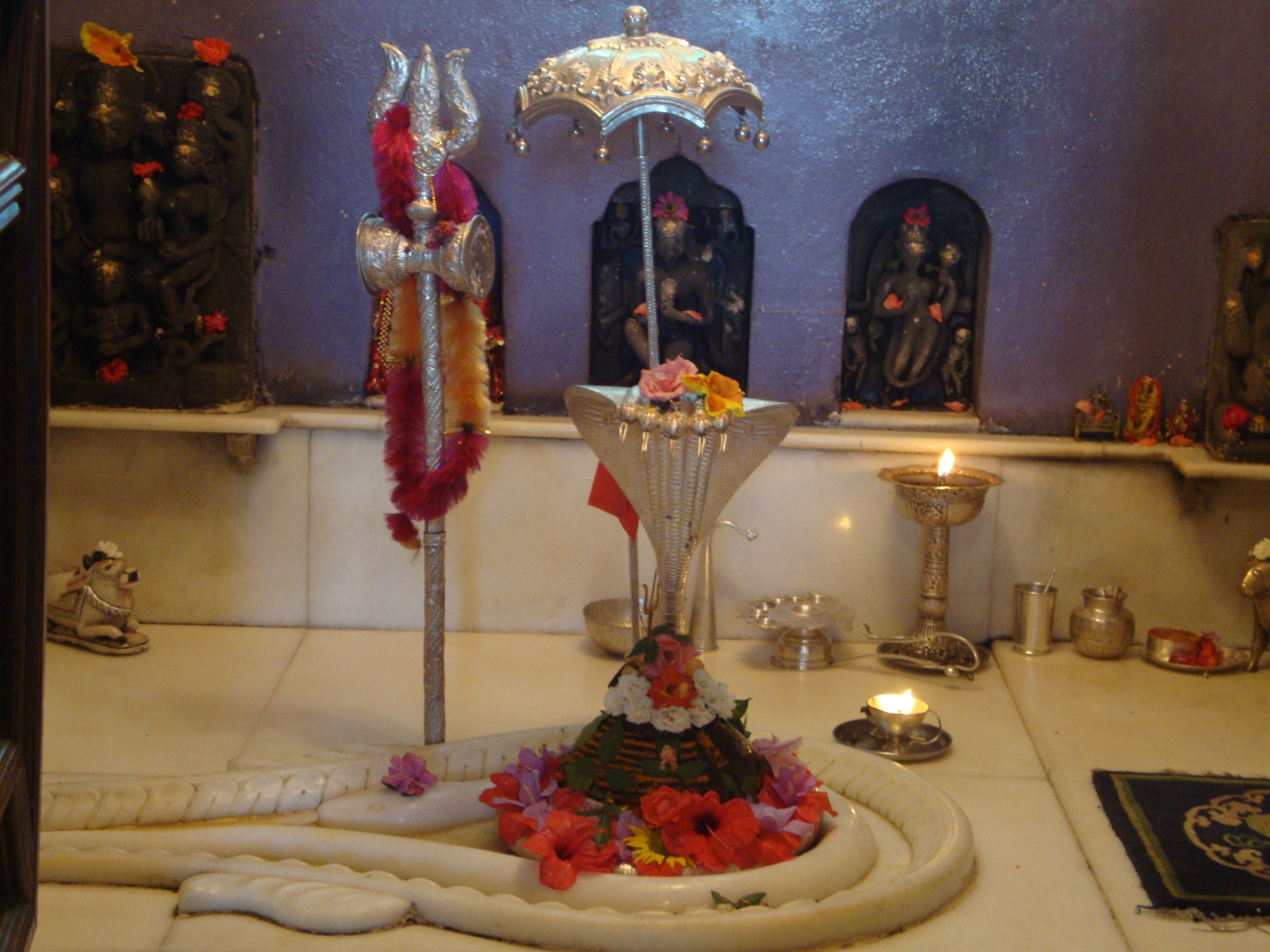
ShivaLingam

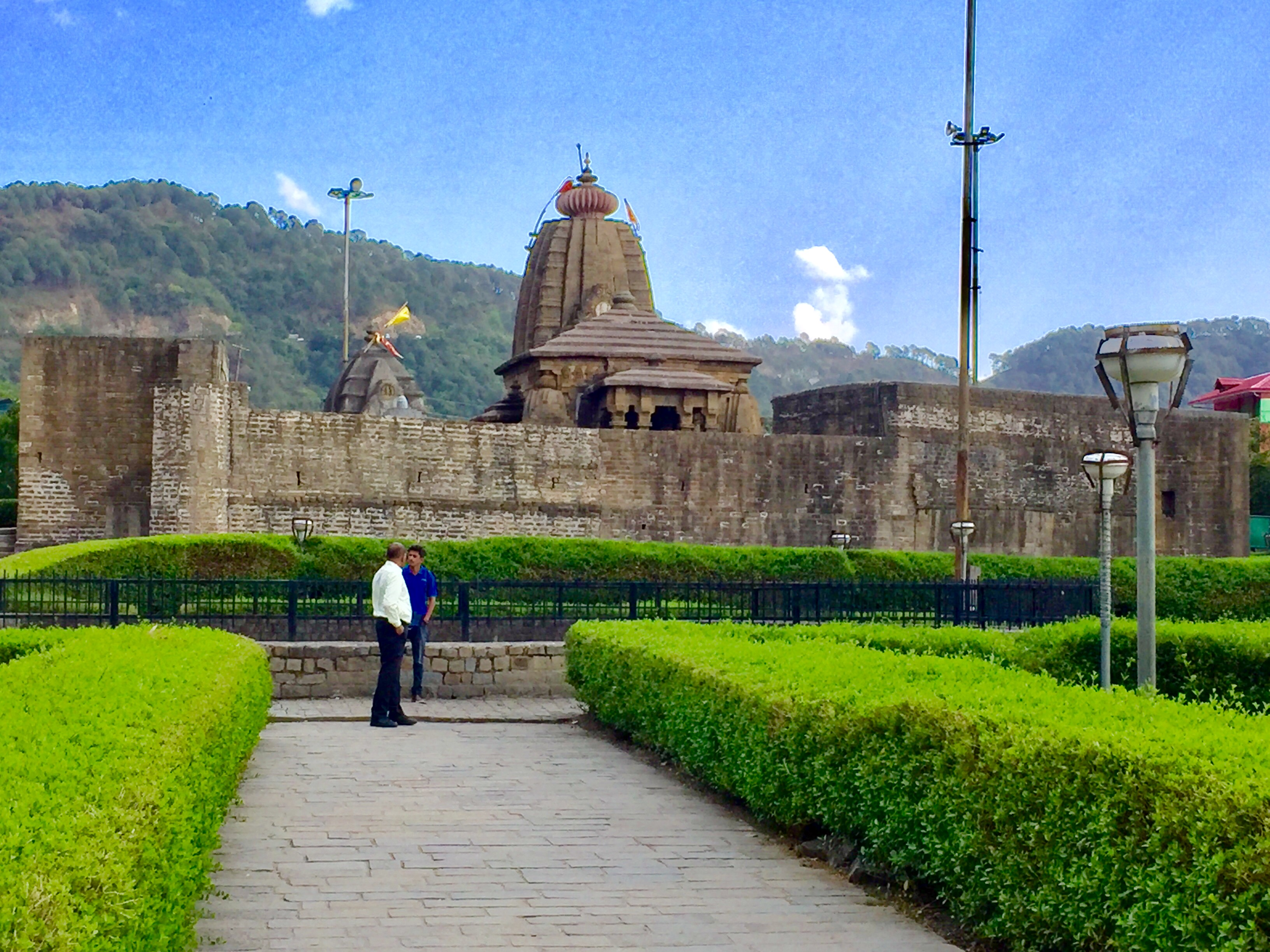
Another picture of entrance

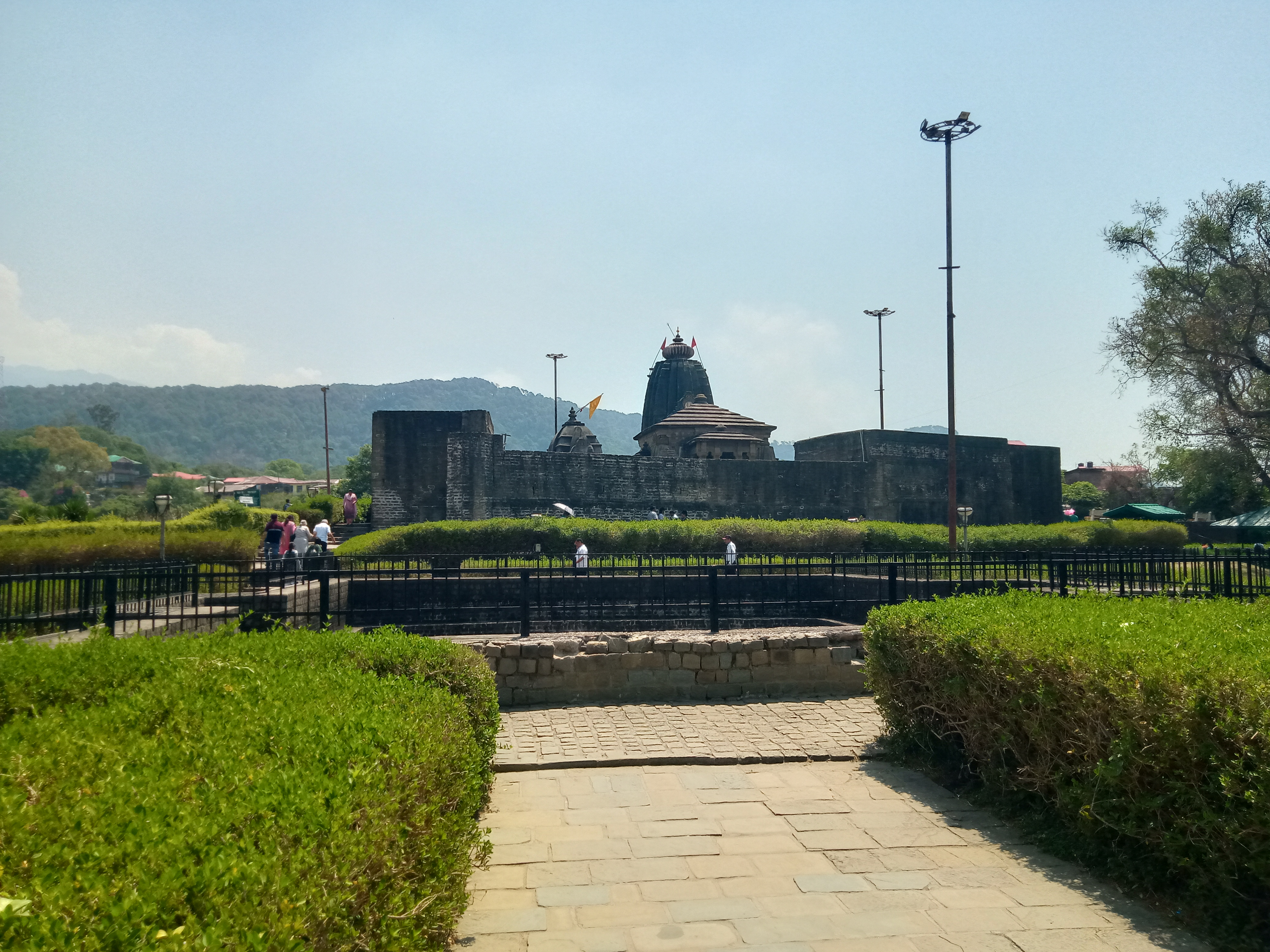
Baijnath Mandir
