= Parli Vaijnath =

- City
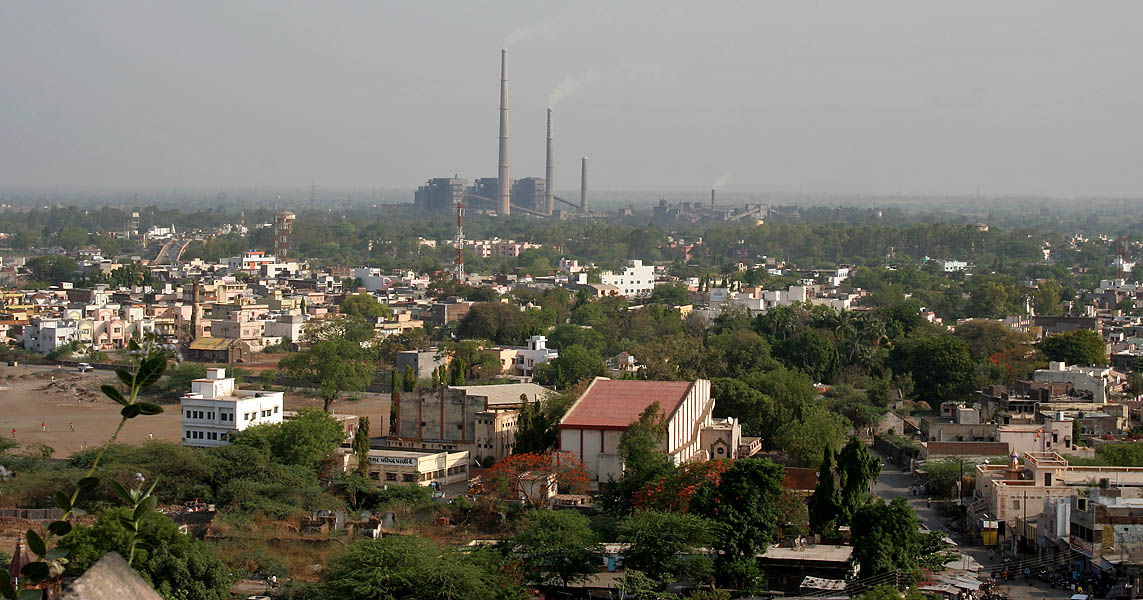

- Location in Maharashtra, India
- Coordinates: 18.85°N 76.53°E
- Country: India
- State: Maharashtra
- District: Beed

Government
  - Type: Municipal Council
  - Body: Parli Vaijnath Municipal Council
  - MLA: Dhananjay Munde, NCP
- Elevation: 461 m (1,512 ft)

Population (2011)
  - Total: 90,975
- Demonym: Parlikar

Languages
  - Official: Marathi
- Time zone: UTC+5:30 (IST)
- Postal code: 431 515
- ISO 3166 code: IN-MH
- Vehicle registration: MH-44

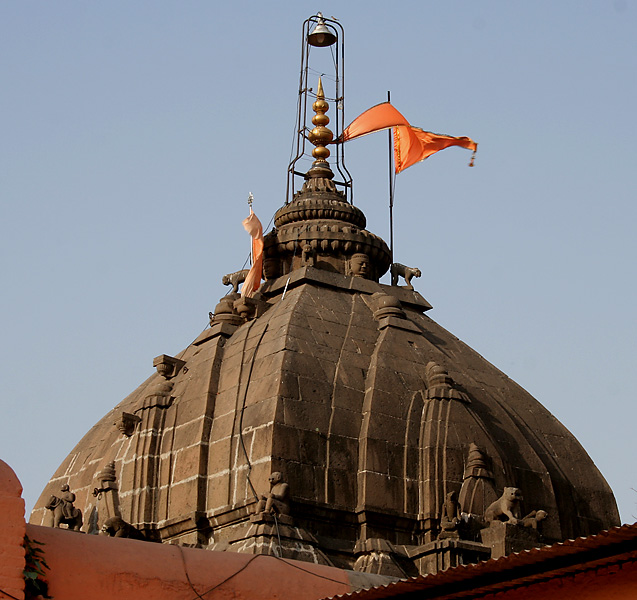
A view of Parli Vaijnath Temple

Parli Vaijnath is a city and a municipal council in Beed district in the Indian state of Maharashtra. Parli is Second largest city in terms of size and population in Bid district. It is the headquarters of the Parli taluka of Beed district.

== About ==
Parli is in Beed district identified by Shri Vaijnath Temple.

Vaijnath temple and Maharashtra State Power Generation Company Limited Parli Thermal Power Station. Other major industries include Vaijnath Sugar Factory, The India Cements Ltd and Ghawalkar Engine, Transmission and Motor Repair and Overhaul Facility. The Head office of Vaidyanath Co-Operative Bank is located in Parli. One of the biggest fair in Maharashtra takes place here on Mahashivratri. Parli is the largest taluka place in Marathwada region of Maharashtra.

== According to Ancient Scriptures ==
It is said that Savitri and Satyavan lived here, and the famous incident of Savitri taking back her beloved husband's life from Yamraj took place here, around the Narayan Mountain. By this claim it can be inferred that Parali was once part of the Madra Kingdom, whose king was Ashvapati, the father of Savitri.

The young Sage Markandeya is also believed to have got the boon to live here in Parli Vaijnath. By this claim, since Markandeya had lived contemporarily to Mahabharata events, even have interacted with King Yudhishtira, it can be understood that the Shivlinga of Vaijnath is at least of that time period and much possibly even before.

== Religious and tourist attractions ==
Shri.Vaidyanath Mandir Parali. The History of Parli Vaijnath Temple says that Rani Ahilyadevi Holkar renovated the Parli Vaijnath Temple in the 1706 AD.

At about 25 kilometres from Parali Vaijnath is Ambejogai.

Aadishakti Mata Yogeshwari Devi Mandir, Ambajogai. She is the Kulswamini/Kuldevi of most Chitpavan Brahmins.

First Poet Shri Mukundraj, Ambajogai. Mukundraj maharaj was one of the earliest Marathi literary poet. There is a Samadhi (Monument) of Mukundraj Maharaj at Ambajogai, 5 KM away from Yogeshwari Temple.

== Demographics ==
As of 2011, has population of 90,975. Male constitute 52% females at 48%. Parli has an average literacy rate of 67.68% higher than the national average of 59.5%: male literacy is 76%, and female literacy is 60%. In Parli, 14% of the population is under 6 years of age.

== Transport ==
Parli Vaijnath railway station is a small railway station in Beed district, Maharashtra. Its code is PRLI. It serves Parli city. The station consists of 3 platforms.

Parli Vaijnath is well connected to Nagpur, Hyderabad, Nizamabad, Latur, Barshi, Manmad, Sangli, Kakinada, Vijayawada, Rajahmundry, Khammam, Warangal, Aurangabad, Jalna, Parbhani, Purna, Nanded, Vikarabad, Zaheerabad, Bidar, Raichur, Guntakal, Mumbai, Nashik, Bengaluru, and Visakhapatnam.

The most common mode of transport within the city is auto-rickshaws. Cab services like Ola, Uber, etc. are not available.

== Political leaders ==
- Gopinath Pandurang Munde was an Indian politician from Maharashtra. A popular Leader in Maharashtra called a Lokneta. He was a senior leader of the Bharatiya Janata Party and Union Minister for Rural and Panchayati Raj in Narendra Modi's Cabinet.
- Pankaja Munde, also known by her married name Pankaja Munde-Palwe, is an Indian politician from the state of Maharashtra and National Secretary of Bharatiya Janata Party.
- Dr. Pritam Gopinath Munde is a doctor and Indian politician who is the current Member of Parliament in the Lok Sabha from Beed from Bharatiya Janata Party. In 2014, she won with a margin of 6,96,321 votes - the highest ever in India's electoral history.
- Dhananjay Panditrao Munde is an Indian politician, from Nationalist Congress Party who is currently a member of the Nationalist Congress Party, and was appointed cabinet minister in Uddhav Thackeray's Maharashtra State.

== Notable people ==
- Vaijnath Mohiniraj Pundlik (1913–2009), architect
