= Baijnath, Kaimur =

Baijnath Baijnāth
- Village
- Location in Bihar, India Baijnath (India)
- Coordinates: 25.28297°N 83.56893°E
- Country: India
- State: Bihar
- District: Kaimur

Area
  - Total: 2.31 km^{2} (0.89 sq mi)
- Elevation: 75 m (246 ft)

Population (2011)
  - Total: 2,482
  - Density: 1,070/km^{2} (2,780/sq mi)

Languages
  - Official: Bhojpuri, Hindi
- Time zone: UTC+5:30 (IST)

Baijnath, also spelled Baidyanath, is a village in Ramgarh block of Kaimur district, Bihar, India. Located in the northeastern part of the district (formerly the Bhabua sub-division), 9 km (5.6 mi) south of Ramgarh, it is the site of an old Shiva temple built during the time of the Pratihara dynasty. Artefacts links to the Pala dynasty have also been found. As of 2011, its population was 2,482, in 380 households.

== History & Archaeology ==
Baidyanath is believed to have been a center of the ancient kingdom of the Savars. The site is surrounded by old relics and ruins from the early kingdom.

=== The Temple on the Mound ===
The central feature of the village is a modern Shaivite temple built atop a large mound. In 1882, an excavation of the mound revealed that it contained the remains of a much older, ancient temple. The current structure is noted for its highly unusual construction. Described as a "medley of sculptures," the small temple was built entirely from the materials of the old shrine. Ancient carved stones and sculptural fragments were used haphazardly in place of conventional bricks, creating a unique architectural collage. The mound itself is also reported to be composed of these ancient sculptural remains.

=== Pala Dynasty Inscription and Other Relics ===
A key historical artifact discovered on the mound is an inscription of King Madanapala (transcribed as Rājā Madan Pāl Deva), a ruler of the Pala dynasty, which dates a period of the site's importance to the Pala era.n addition to the temple, the immediate vicinity contains several other sculpted obelisks and pillars, further highlighting the area's archaeological heritage.
