= Baijnath, Himachal Pradesh =

Baijnath
- Village
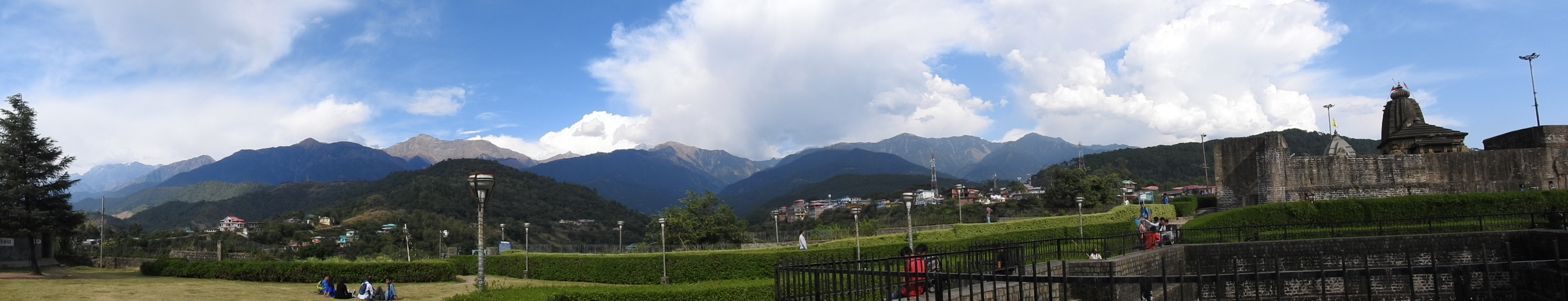
- Panoramic view of Shiva Temple of Baijnath

- Location in Himachal Pradesh, India Baijnath (India)
- Coordinates: 32.05°N 76.65°E
- Country: India
- State: Himachal Pradesh
- District: Kangra
- Elevation: 998 m (3,274 ft)

Languages
  - Official: Hindi
  - Native: Pahari (Palampuri Kangri)
- Time zone: UTC+5:30 (IST)
- PIN: 176125
- Website: www.bababaijnath.in

Baijnath is a town in the Kangra district of Himachal Pradesh, India. It is about 50 kilometers from district headquarters, Dharamshala. A Hindu temple of Lord Shiva (Baijnath) is situated there giving the town its name.

== Geography ==
Baijnath is a small township in the Dhauladhar range of the western Himalayas, 16 km from Palampur in Kangra District. It is also near Ravana. Other neighbouring towns are Paprola, Kangra (51 km) and Joginder Nagar. Rajiv Gandhi Government Post Graduate Ayurvedic College, Paprola is a government Ayurvedic medical college located in Paprola, Kangra district, Himachal Pradesh. The college is situated on National Highway 20, approximately 2 kilometers from the historic Baijnath Temple.

== Baijnath Temple ==
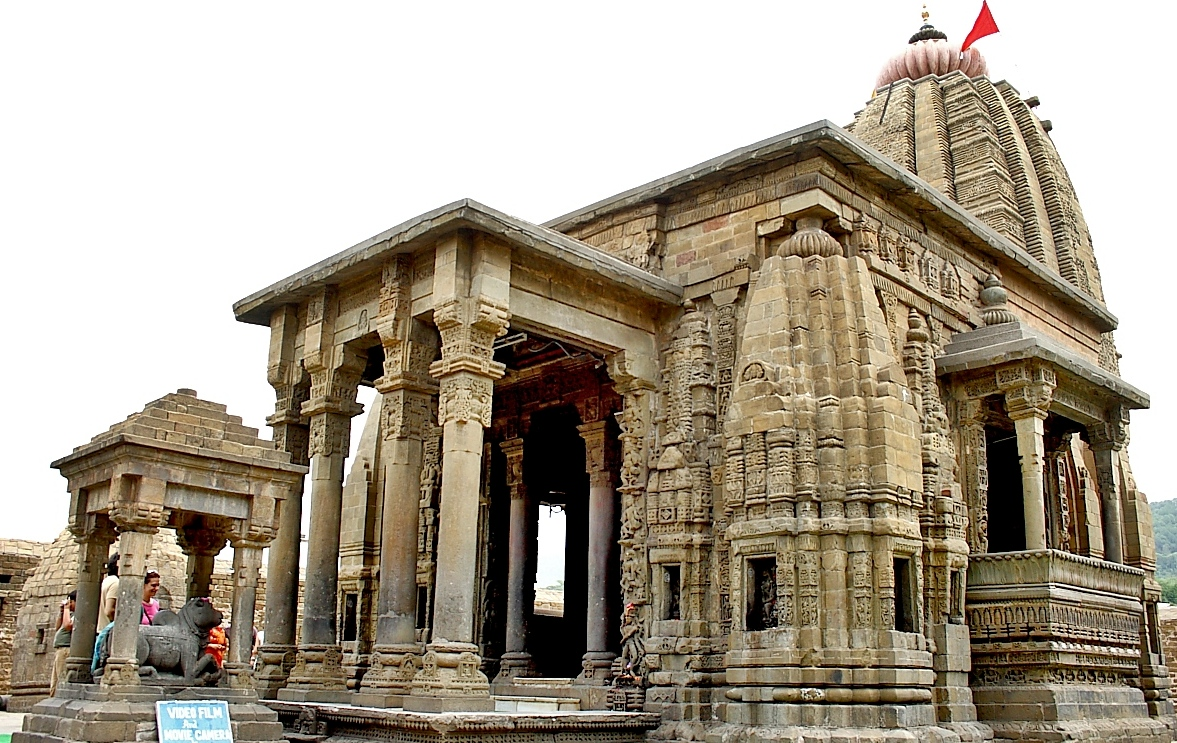
Shiva Temple of Baijnath

The main attraction of Baijnath is Baijnath Temple, a temple of Lord Shiva.Baijnath Temple (Devanagari: बैजनाथ मंदिर) is a Nagara style Hindu temple), and was built in 1204 AD[1] by two local merchants named Ahuka and Manyuka. It is dedicated to Shiva as Vaidyanath

== Other temples ==
Other shrines included Mukut Nath temple at Sansal (6 km), Awahi Nag temple (1.5 km), and Mahankal Temple (5 km) at Mahankal.

Tibetan monasteries are located at Sherabling (Bhattu) (5 km), Chauntra and Chowgan.

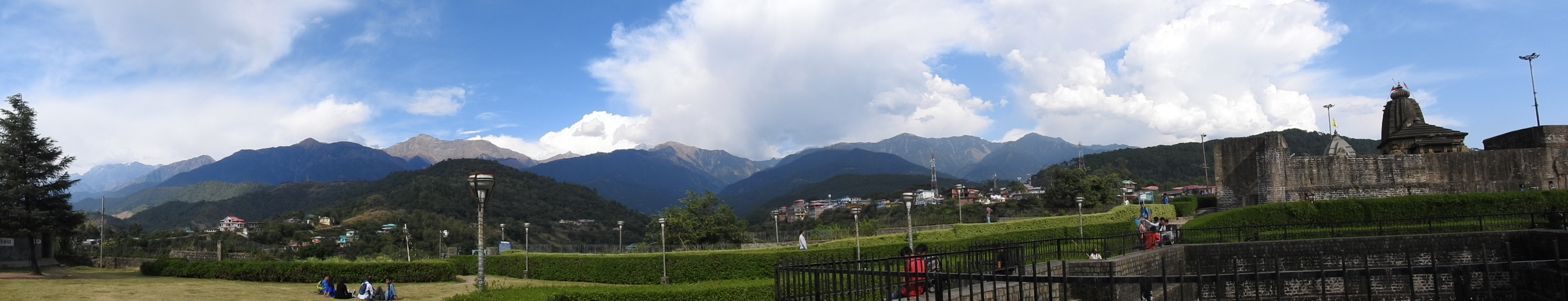
Panoramic view of Shiva Temple of Baijnath

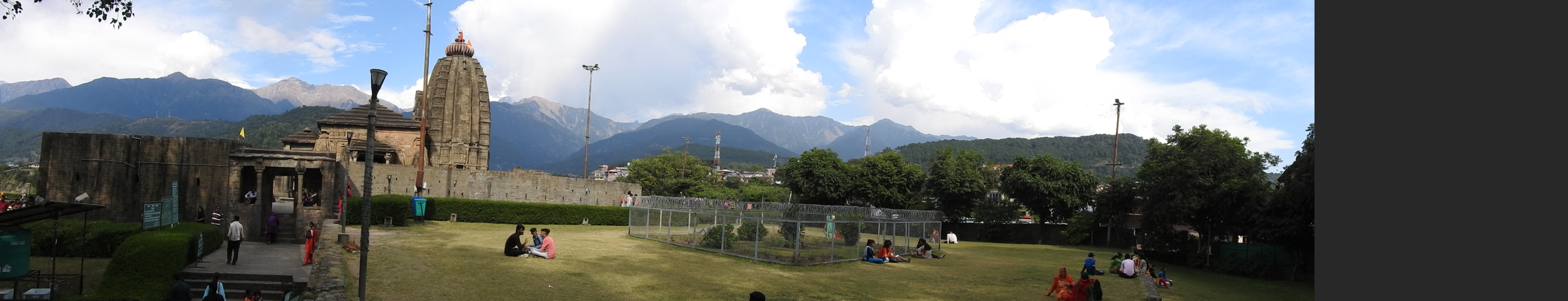
Panoramic view of Shiva Temple of Baijnath

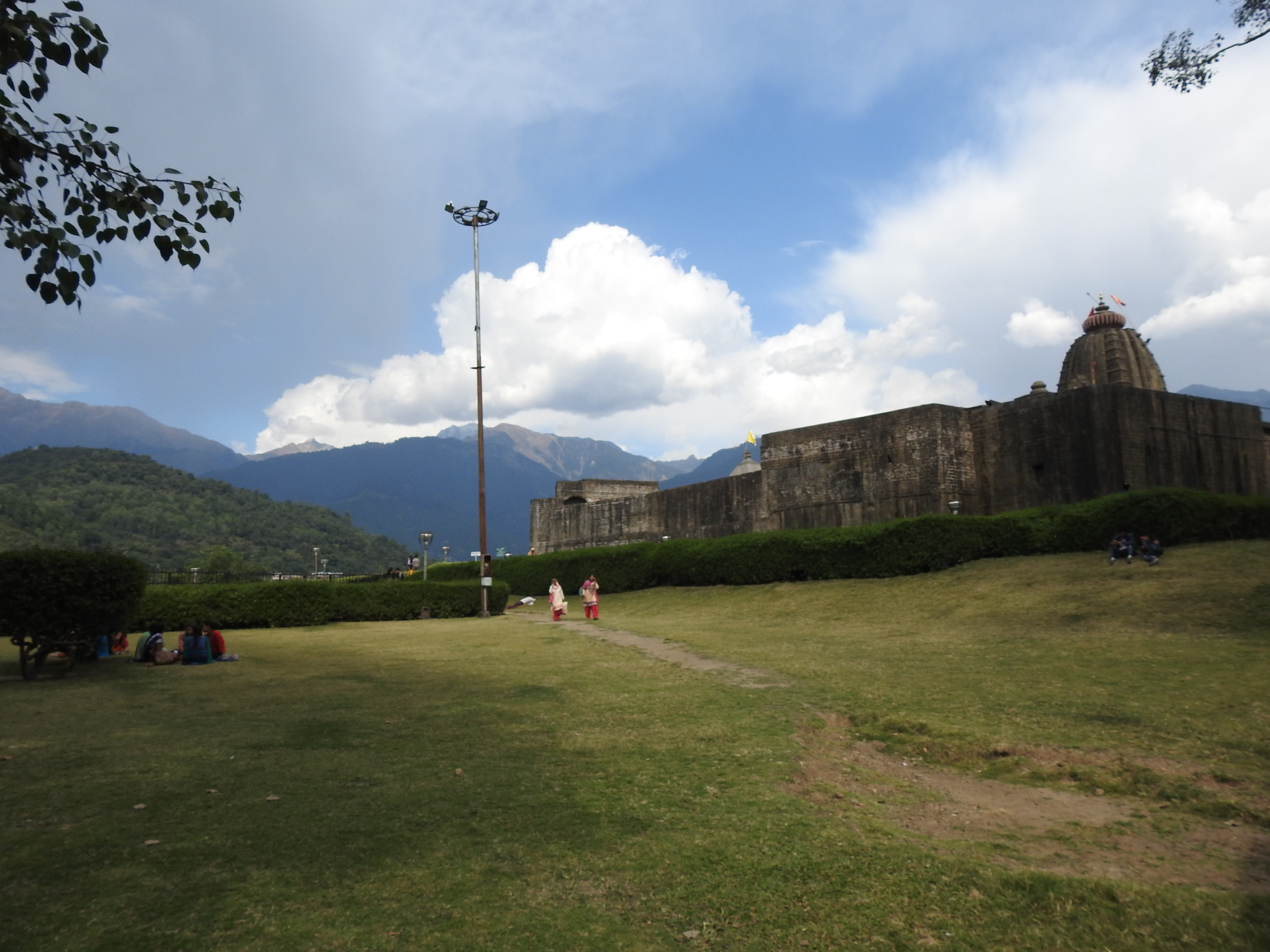

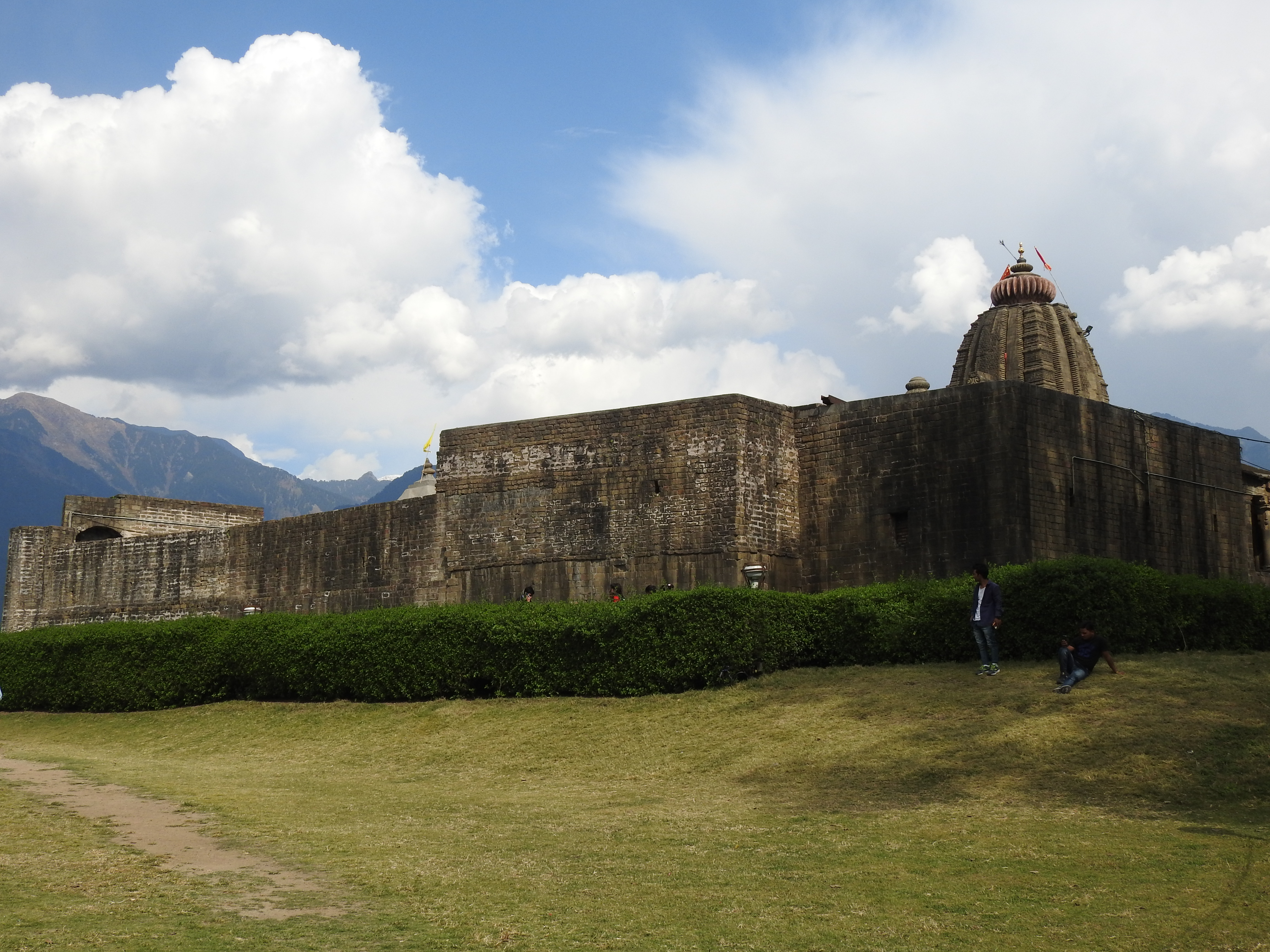

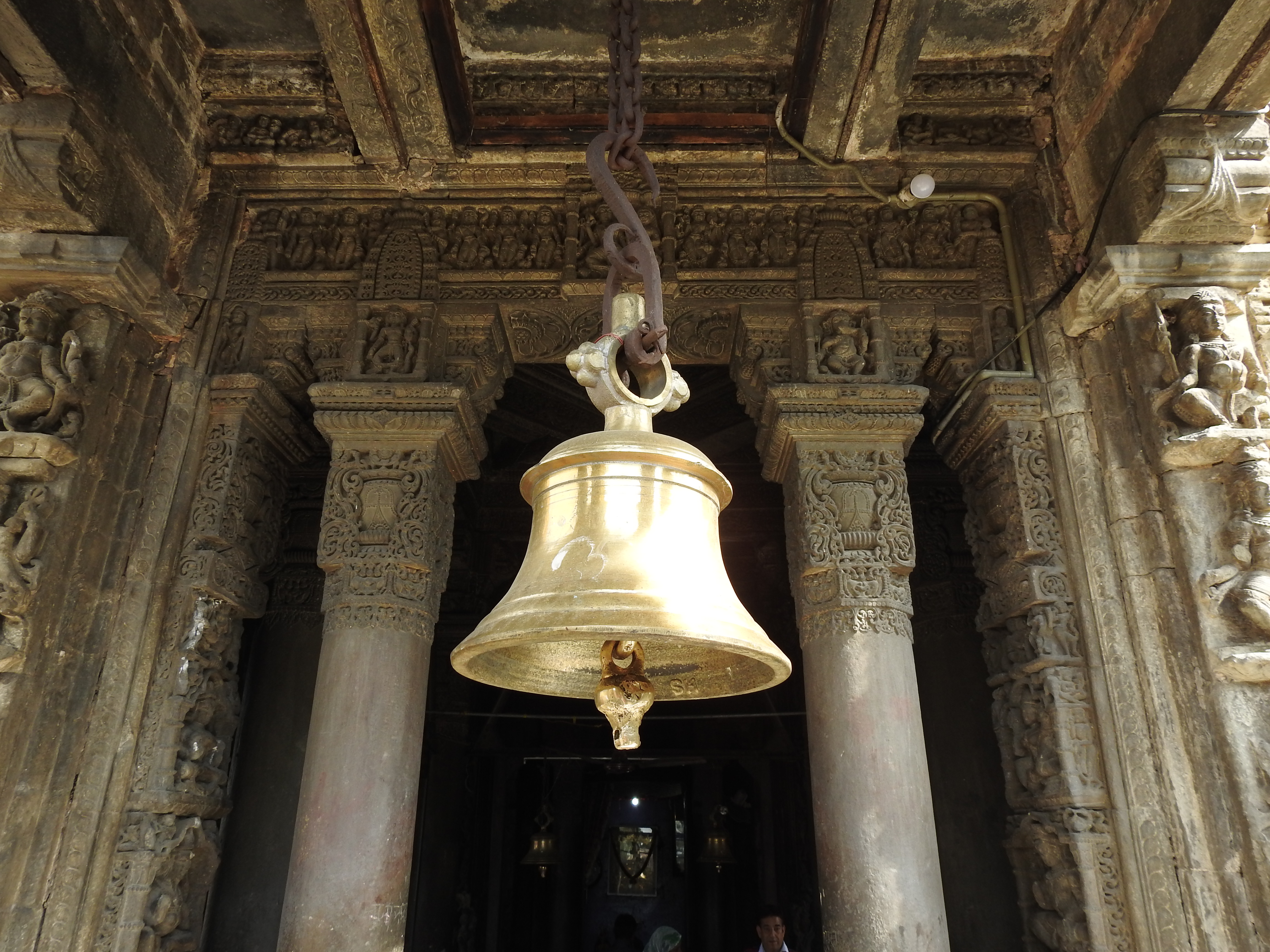
Sacrad bell (Tall)

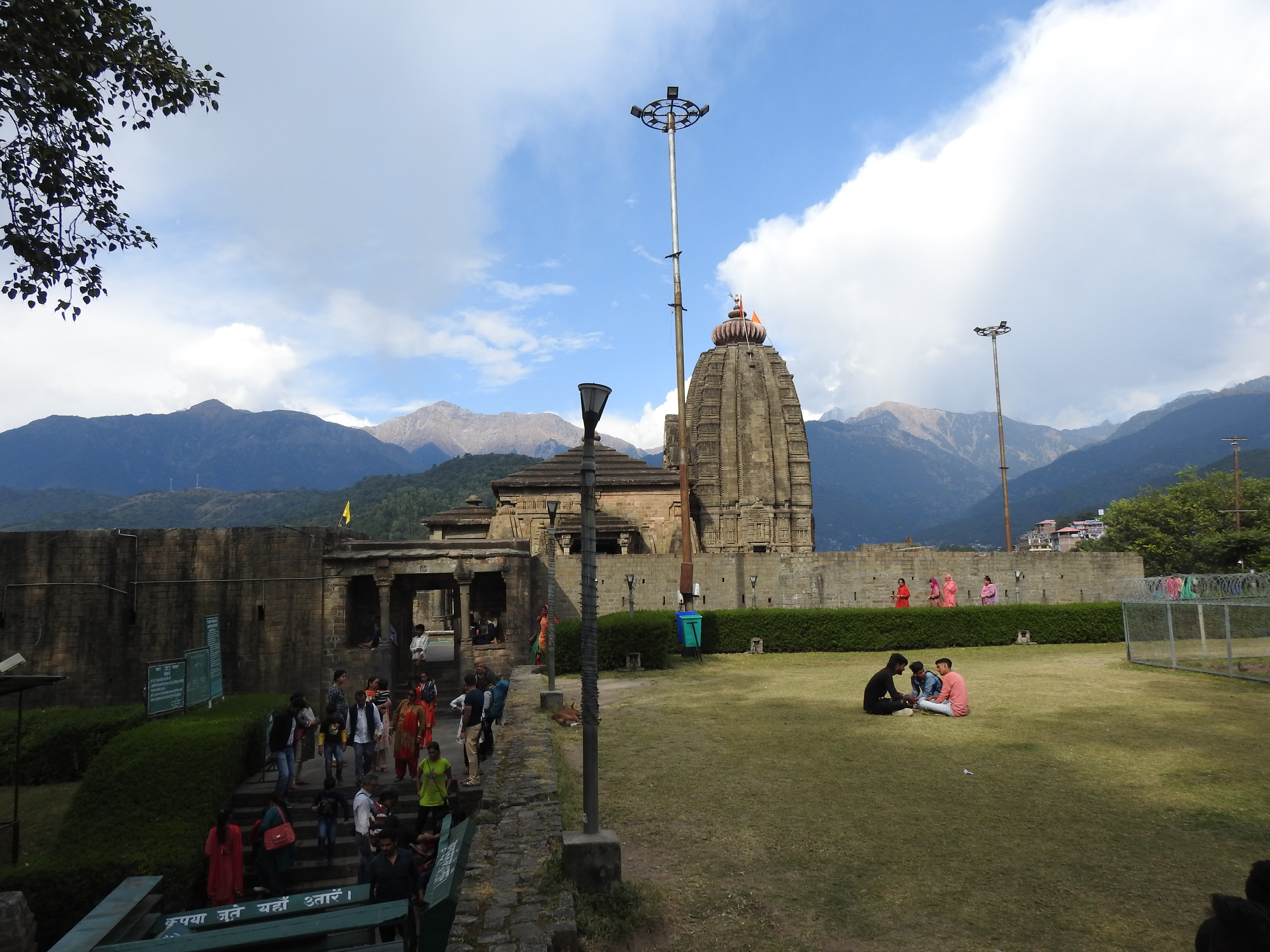

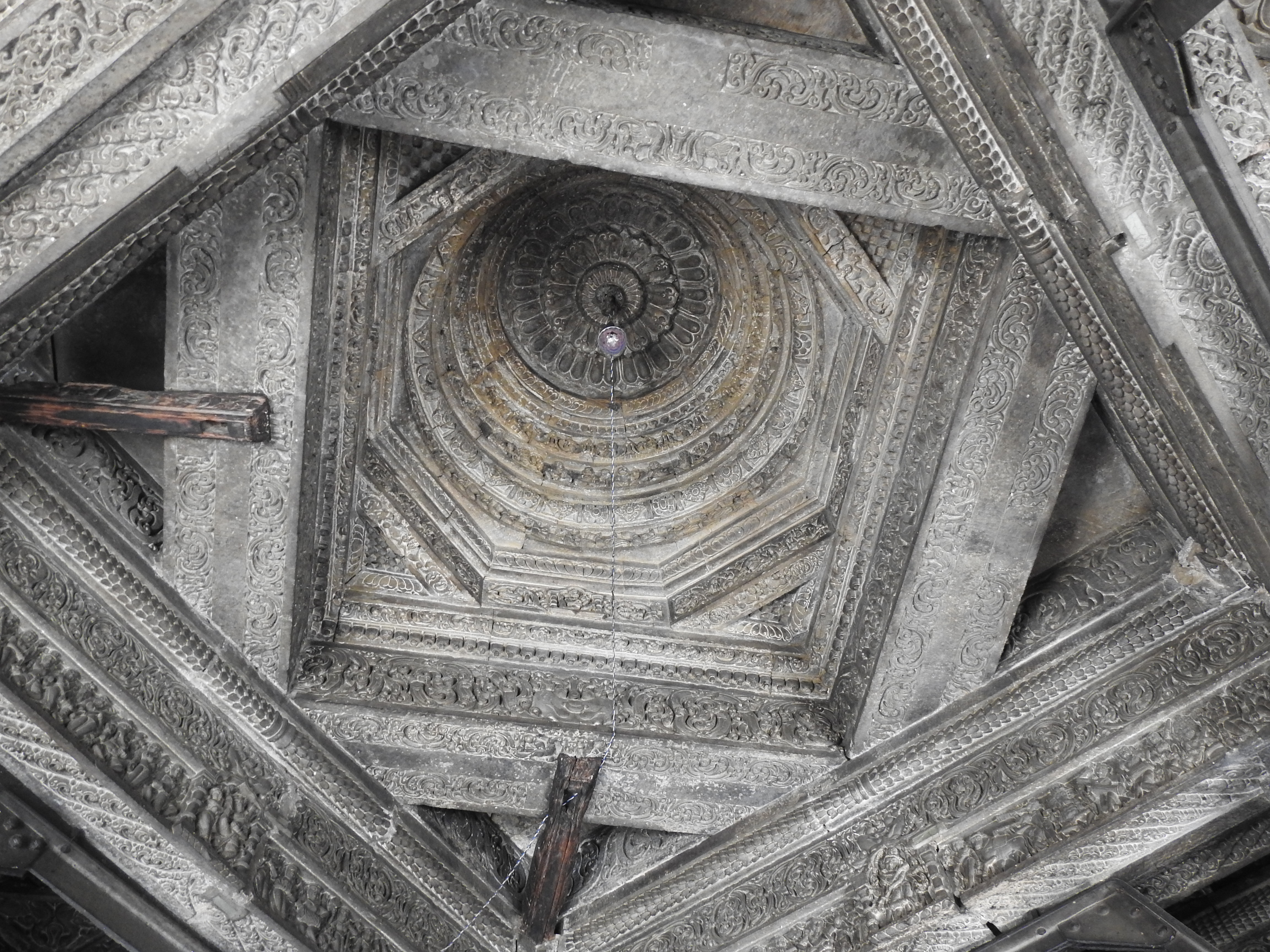
Inner view

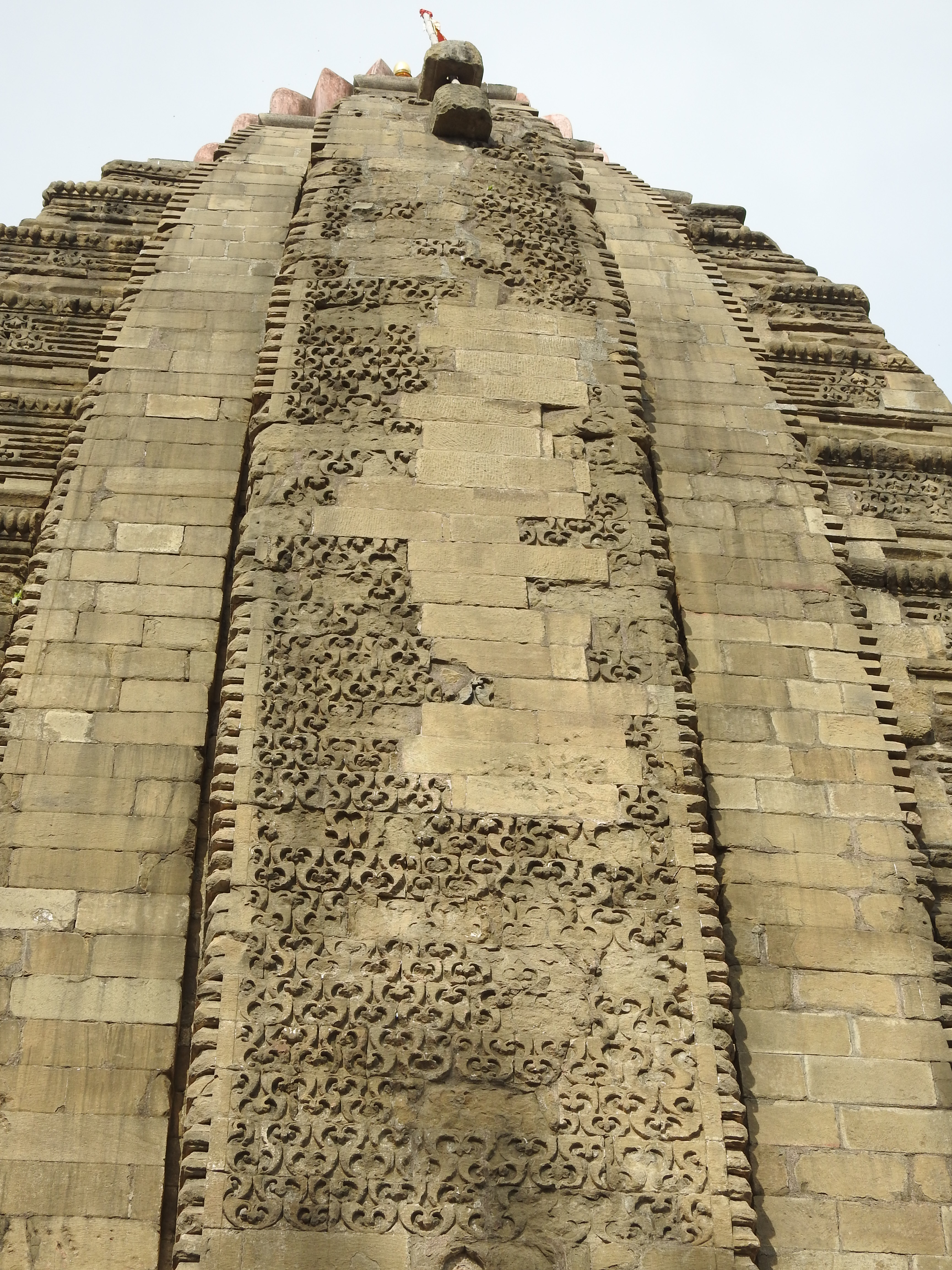
Outer view of Architect of Shiva temple
