= Vishnupuri, Nanded =

Village in Maharashtra

Vishnupuri
- Village
- Location in Maharashtra, India Vishnupuri (India)
- Coordinates: 19°06′43″N 77°17′20″E
- Country: India
- State: Maharashtra
- District: Nanded

Government
  - Type: Gram panchayat

Population (2011)
  - Total: 6,910
- Demonym: Hambarde Vishnupurikar

Languages
  - Official: Marathi
- Time zone: UTC+5:30 (IST)
- PIN: 431606
- Telephone code: 02466
- Vehicle registration: MH-26

Vishnupuri is a village in Nanded taluka of Nanded district in the Indian state of Maharashtra. It is 10 kilometres (6.2 mi) from Nanded city on the Nanded-Latur highway. Though it is a village, it is now a suburb of the city due its close proximity and rapid urbanisation. Swami Ramanand Teerth Marathwada University, Shri Guru Gobind Singhji Institute of Engineering and Technology, Dr. Shankarrao Chavan Government Medical College, sahayog educational campus are located there

== Demography ==
- As per 2011 census, Vishnupuri has total 1,256 families residing. Village has population of 6,910 of which 3,570 were males while 3,340 were females.
- Average Sex Ratio of village is 936 which is higher than Maharashtra state average of 929.
- Literacy rate of village was 80% compared to 82.95% of Maharashtra. Male literacy rate was 87% while female literacy rate was 72%.
- Schedule Caste (SC) constitutes 23.5% of total population while Schedule Tribe population was 1.2%.

== Geography and transport ==
Following table shows distance of Vishnupuri from various cities.

City	Distance(km)
Nanded	10
Loha	24
Sonkhed	13
Parbhani	58
Latur	126
Hingoli	78
Aurangabad	237
Mumbai	540

== Politics ==
Vishnupuri is a part of Nanded South constituency for the Maharashtra Legislative Assembly. As of 2019, the Member of the Legislative Assembly representing Vishnupuri was Mohanrao Hambarde of the Congress party. Since, Hemant Patil has been elected as an MP from neighbouring Hingoli LS constituency, this assembly seat is vacant and election for the same was set to be held in October 2019 along with the state general election.

For elections to the Parliament of India, the village is a part of Nanded constituency and has Prataprao Patil Chikhalikar, a former MLA as its representative in the Lok Sabha. Conventionally Shiv Sena has a strong hold in this region.

== Notable people ==
- Mohanrao Marotrao Hambarde, MLA (2019-2024)
