= Sonkhed =

Village in Maharashtra

- Village
- Location in Maharashtra, India Sonkhed (India)
- Coordinates: 18.99112°N 77.10955°E
- Country: India
- State: Maharashtra
- District: Nanded

Government
  - Type: Gram panchayat

Population (2011)
  - Total: 5,995
- Demonym: Sonkhedkar

Languages
  - Official: Marathi
- Time zone: UTC+5:30 (IST)
- PIN: 431708
- Telephone code: 02466
- Vehicle registration: MH-26

Sonkhed is a village in Loha taluka of Nanded district in Maharashtra state of India.

== Demography ==
Sonkhed is a village with total 1100 families residing. The Sonkhed village has population of 5995 of which 3110 are males while 2885 are females as per Population Census 2011. Average Sex Ratio of Sonkhed village is 928 which is lower than Maharashtra state average of 929.

Schedule Caste (SC) constitutes 15.60% while Schedule Tribe (ST) were 0.53% of total population in Sonkhed village.

Sonkhed village has lower literacy rate compared to Maharashtra. In 2011, literacy rate of Sonkhed village was 78.08% compared to 82.34% of Maharashtra. In Sonkhed Male literacy stands at 86.13% while female literacy rate was 69.49%.

== Transport ==
It is located 22 km towards South from District headquarters Nanded. 16 km from Loha. 536 km from State capital Mumbai.

There is no railway station in Sonkhed, nearest railway stations are Wanegaon(17 km), Limbgaon(18 km), Nanded(19 km). Nearest airport Shri Guru Gobind Singh Ji Airport, Nanded is 22 km away.

== Politics ==
Sonkhed comes under Nanded South for assembly elections of Maharashtra. Current member of Maharashtra Legislative Assembly representing Sonkhed is Hemant Sriram Patil of Shiv Sena since 2014. While it comes under Nanded (Lok Sabha constituency) for Indian general elections. Current member of parliament representing Sonkhed is Ashok Chavan of Indian National Congress who is also former Chief Minister of Maharashtra.

== Culture ==
Wednesday is the day of weekly market in Sonkhed, hundreds of people from surrounding villages comes to Sonkhed on weekly market day. Well known Maroti Temple lie in centre of market place while other temples includes temple of Sant Tukaram, Goddess Satvaai or Sataamai, Goddess Marimaai. Besides market place there is grand Mosque for Muslims while Sonkhed also have a Buddhist Vihara which is known as Samaaj Mandir. Most of marriages of local Buddhist people takes place at this Samaaj Mandir.

== Institutions ==
Sonkhed is one of major village in Nanded district. It has Primary health centre and Police station, both of which covers 40-60 surrounding small villages. Sonkhed have facility of education till graduation level and students from surrounding small villages come to Sonkhed for studies.
