= List of educational institutions in Nanded (India) =

Nanded is a city and a municipal corporation in the state of Maharashtra, India. The literacy rate of the city is 87.40%. Nanded district has a geographical area of 10,422 km2.

There are a total of 504 High Schools (Secondary/Sr Secondary schools) in Nanded district. The district has a Government Polytechnic, Government Aided Engineering College and Government Medical College. Swami Ramanand Teerth Marathwada University (SRTMU) has 129 college affiliations.

This is a list of reputed educational institutions in Nanded.

== University ==
- Swami Ramanand Teerth Marathwada University

== Medical ==
- Dr. Shankarrao Chavan Government Medical College (DSCGMC), Vishnupuri
- Government Ayurvedic (BAMS) College, Nanded
- Nanded Rural Dental College & Research Center, Pangri Dist-Nanded
- Padmashri Dr. Shyamrao Kadam Homeopathy (BHMS) College, Nanded
- Unani (BUMS) Rasshala

== Engineering ==
- Shri Guru Gobind Singhji Institute of Engineering and Technology (SGGS) - Autonomous
- Mahatma Gandhi Mission's (MGM) College of Engineering, Nanded
- Matoshri Prathistan's Engineering College
- Gramin College of Engineering, Vishnupuri

== Pharmacy ==
- Nanded Pharmacy College, Patnoorkar Nagar
- Indira Institute of Pharmacy, Vishnupuri

== Law ==
- Narayan Rao Chavan Law College, Visava Nagar, Nanded
- SP Law College

== Management ==
- Indira Institute of Management, Vishnupuri, Nanded
- Matoshri Pratishthan's School of Management, Jijau Nagar, Khupsarwadi, Nanded
- Nandigram Institute of Management Studies, Pangri Vishnupuri, Nanded

== Arts, Science and Commerce ==
- Peoples College Nanded
- Science College Nanded
- Government polytechnic, Nanded
- Yeshwant Mahavidhyalaya
- Madeena-Tul-Uloom College
- Netaji SubhashChandraa Bose College (NSB)
- MGM's College of Computer Science & IT, Nanded
- Rajiv Gandhi College [RGC]
- N.E.S. Science College, Nanded
- Vasantrao Naik College, Vasarni, Nanded
- S.S.B.'S Institute of Technology & Management (ITM), V.I.P Road, Nanded
- Indira Gandhi Senior College, CIDCO, Nanded
- Assuffa International School & College of Science, Arts & Comm., Nanded
- Rajiv Gandhi College of Computer Sci.& Management, Vidhyut Nagar, Nanded
- Marathwada Institute of Computer Science, Manik Nagar, Taroda, Nanded
- B.S.S.S's Mayur College of Information Technology & Management, Anand Nagar, Nanded
- Late Laxmanraoji Information Technology College, Manik Nagar, Nanded
- Vasant Kale College of Computational & Management, Vishnupuri, Nanded
- College of Computer Science & I.T., Nanded
- Mahatma Gandhi College of Architecture, Pokharni, Nanded
- Vishvbharti Mahavidyalaya, CIDCO, Nanded
- Information Technology College, Godavari Complex, Nanded
- K.R.M. Mahila Arts & Comm Mahavidyalaya, Vazirabad, Nanded
- Sharda Bhavan Education Society's College of Education, V.I.P. Road, Nanded.
- Smt. Indira Gandhi Adhyapak Mahavidyalaya, Vasarni, Nanded
- Vivek Vardhini Mahila Adhyapak Mahavidyalaya, Visava Nagar, Nanded
- Yeshwant College of Physical Education, CIDCO, Nanded
- Sahyog Seva Bhavi Sanstha's College of Education Vishnupuri, Nanded
- Pradnya Pratishtan's Adhyaapak Mahavidyalaya, Purna Road, Nanded
- G.S.P.M.'s Gramin Science Vocational College, Vishnupuri, Nanded
- Sidharth College & Shikshan Parbodhani College, Tadoda, Nanded
- Sharda Bhavan Education Society's Academe of Architecture, Nanded
- Potdar College, Dhangarwadi, Latur Road, Nanded
- Raje Mahendra (Night) College, Rajashri Shahoo Nagar, Nanded
- Gurukul Public School & Junior College, Pawdewadi, Nanded

== Schools, Junior Colleges ==
- Oxford the global school
- Gyan Mata Vidya Vihar Senior Secondary School
- Holy City Public School
- Podar International School
- Pinnacle International School
- Narayana e-Techno School
- Faizul Uloom Primary School, High School & Junior College
- Yusufiya Primary School, High School and Junior College
- Madeena-Tul-Uloom High School and Junior College
- Universal English Medium School

Kamtha Chowk, Maltekri Road, Kamtha (kh.) Nanded - 431605 www.universalschool.in/8600006060

- Cambridge Vidyalaya
- Mahatma Phule Vidyalaya
- Nagarjuna Public School
- Sandeepani Public School
- Kids Kingdom Public School
- Sana Urdu Primary School, High School & Junior College
- Al-Rizwan Jr. College & Group Of Schools
- Gujarati High School
- Shaheen International School & Junior College, Nanded
- Pratibha Niketan High School
- Iqra Urdu Primary School, High School & Junior College
- Kendriya Vidyalaya SCR Nanded
- Sana International School
- Dar-Al-Arqam Public School
- Olive Tree English School
