= Government College of Engineering, Karad =

Engineering college in Maharashtra, India

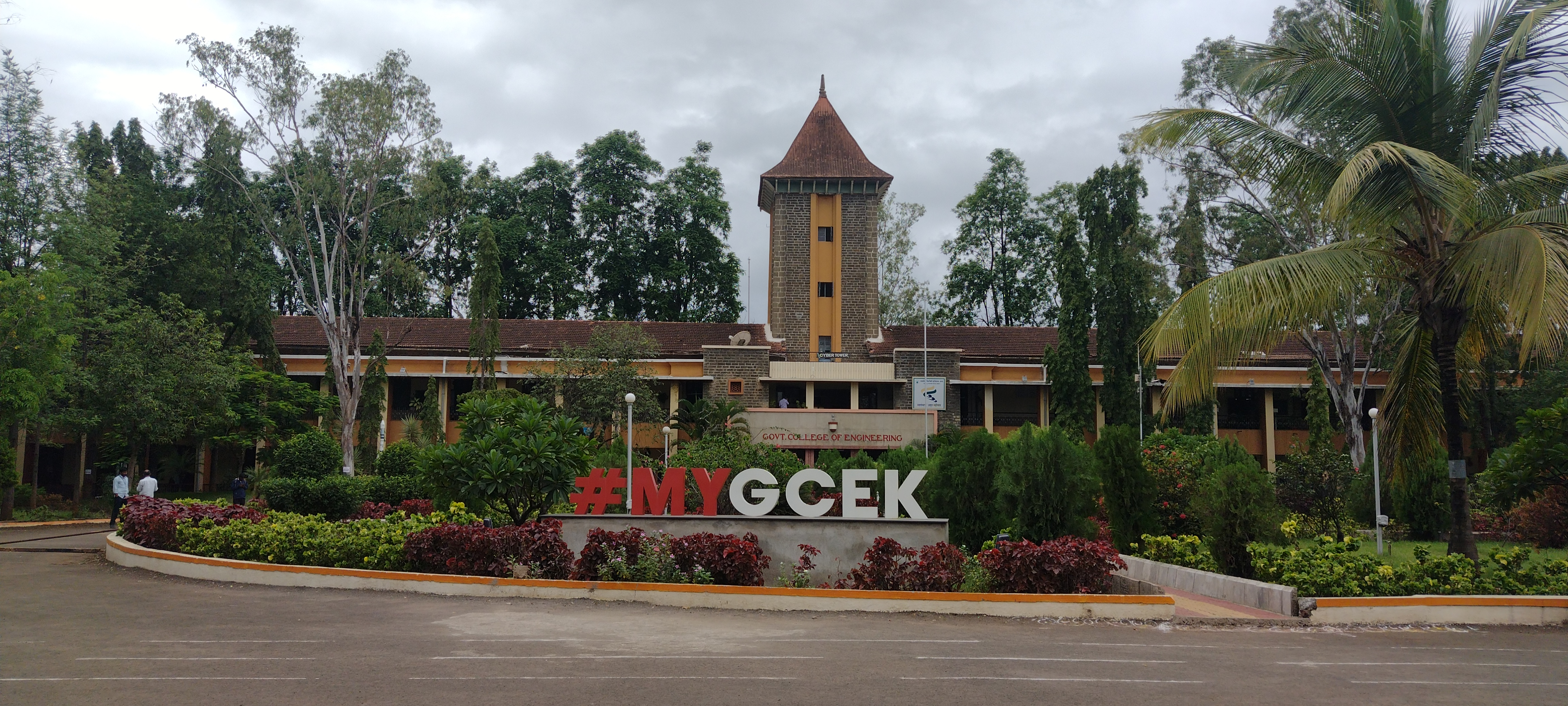
- Motto: Truth, Endurance, Perfection
- Type: Government Autonomous Institute
- Established: 1960
- Affiliations: AICTE, Shivaji University
- Principal: Dr. V.N. Kulkarni
- Faculty: 80
- Students: 1,700
- Undergraduates: 1,400
- Postgraduates: 300
- Location: Vidyanagar, Karad, Maharashtra, India; 17°18′31.52″N 74°11′5.61″E
- Campus: 70 acres (28 ha)
- Website: www.gcekarad.ac.in

Government College of Engineering, Karad (GCEK) is an autonomous technical institute in the Indian state of Maharashtra. It was established in 1960 and is affiliated to the Shivaji University with an autonomous status under the UGC. The autonomy was granted in 2015 by the UGC. Karad is a culturally vibrant town and is a sought after center of education in Western Maharashtra.

The students and alumni of Government College of Engineering, Karad are colloquially referred to as GCOEKians.

Over the years the college has produced about 10140 engineers and more than 700 computer professionals through a Master of Computer Application course in the Engineering faculty.

Government College of Engineering, Karad is located in Vidyanagar, Karad besides Saidapur.

== Departments ==
- Electrical Engineering Department
- Civil Engineering Department
- Mechanical Engineering Department
- Information Technology Department
- Electronics and Telecommunication Engineering Department
- Basic Sciences and Humanities
- Master of Computer Applications

== Academics ==
=== Admissions ===
==== Undergraduate ====
The admissions to the college are governed by the State CET Cell and Directorate of Technical Education (DTE). The State CET Cell hold the all Maharashtra State level MHT-CET (Maharashtra Common Entrance Test), which was a compulsory examination to admission in engineering. The score of MHT-CET is necessary to get admission into the Government Colleges in Maharashtra, while the score of JEE Mains is only applicable for private Engineering Institutes.

The ratio of girls students to boys students is 34:66. Being a government institute, all seats are strictly filled as per government norms.

==== Post-graduate ====
In 2013, Admissions are given on the basis of both GATE 2013 and DTE-held PGET-CET 2013 basis. From 2014 onwards, all the admissions will be given on the basis of GATE score.

=== Academic programmes ===
Government College of Engineering Karad offers 5 undergraduate and 6 post graduate programmes. Details are:

- Master of Technology (M.Tech)
  - Construction Management – Started in 2005
  - Structural Engineering – Started in 1967
  - Electrical Power System – Started in 2005
  - Heat Power Engineering – Started in 2005
  - Production Engineering – Started in 1967
  - Design Engineering – Started in 2019
  - Computer Science and Engineering – Started in 2019
- Master in Computer Application (M.C.A.) – Started in 1992
- Bachelor of Technology (B.Tech)
  - Civil Engineering – Started in 1960
  - Information Technology – Started in 2001
  - Electrical Engineering – Started in 1960
  - Electronics and Telecommunication Engineering – Started in 2007
  - Mechanical Engineering – Started in 1960

== Campus ==
The campus is situated in Vidyanagar, Karad. GCEK has a green campus of about 40 acres(161874 m2). All departments & laboratories are housed on the campus. Residential accommodation for teaching & non-teaching staff of the college are available on the campus. Consciously developed, the campus has retained & increased its green cover, rich in natural flora & fauna, & provides an attraction for bird watchers.

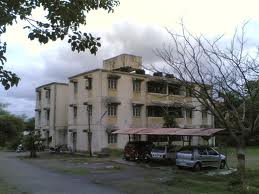
Staff hostel

The college provides residential facilities for both undergraduate boys and girls. Due to limited vacancies, admissions are merit-based. There are three residential buildings in the hostel campus. Boys' blocks are named B, C, D. The total capacity of boys hostels is 480. For girls, there is one block, namely, Jijau. This was constructed keeping in mind, the huge number of the college's girl-students staying outside. Its capacity is 240. Jijau is four storied, and the remaining buildings are three storied. For PG there's a hostel for boys with capacity of 45.

Further it comprises the principal's residence, hostel office, security room, rectors' quarters, a co-operative store, students' dining rooms. The institute also has a well-equipped gym for students. The Gymkhana consists of Gymkhana Secretary along with secretaries of various sports and cultural committees. The institute has a large ground for sports activities including cricket, football, volleyball, kabbadi, kho-kho.

=== Library ===
The Central library is equipped with the library software with barcode system (OPAC). It has around 28279 titles of text/reference books with a volume of 65583 in the relevant disciplines of engineering. It also has around 80 top national and international scientific journal. Students can also avail the book bank facility. Every department has its own departmental library, maintained by students through their respective associations.

== Student life ==
=== Events ===
The flagship event "Aavishkar" is a national level techno-managerial event, which showcases the technical and managerial skills of the students held every year. This event is entirely managed by students for the students.

== See also ==
Other Government Engineering Colleges (GEC's) in Maharashtra

- College of Engineering, Pune
1. Government College of Engineering, Amravati
2. Government College of Engineering, Chhatrapati Sambhajinagar
3. Government College of Engineering, Chandrapur
4. Government College of Engineering, Jalgaon
5. Government College Of Engineering And Research, Avasari Khurd
6. Government College Of Engineering, Yavatmal
7. Government College Of Engineering, Ratnagiri
8. Government College Of Engineering, Kolhapur
9. Government College of Engineering, Nagpur
- Walchand College of Engineering, Sangli
- Shri Guru Gobind Singhji Institute of Engineering and Technology, Nanded
- Veermata Jijabai Technological Institute, Mumbai
