= List of educational institutions in Nizamabad (India) =

Educational institutions in Nizamabad include primary, secondary and university level systems. Nizamabad is a major urban center and the third largest city in Telangana.

The area hosts 727 high schools. It has nine private engineering colleges and a state university as well as a government medical A total of 143 junior colleges, of which 31 are administered by the Telangana Government are present. The district has undergraduate degree-granting (3-year Bachelors) and post-graduate colleges. Telangana University has 149 college affiliations, 86 of which are in Nizamabad and 63 in Adilabad.

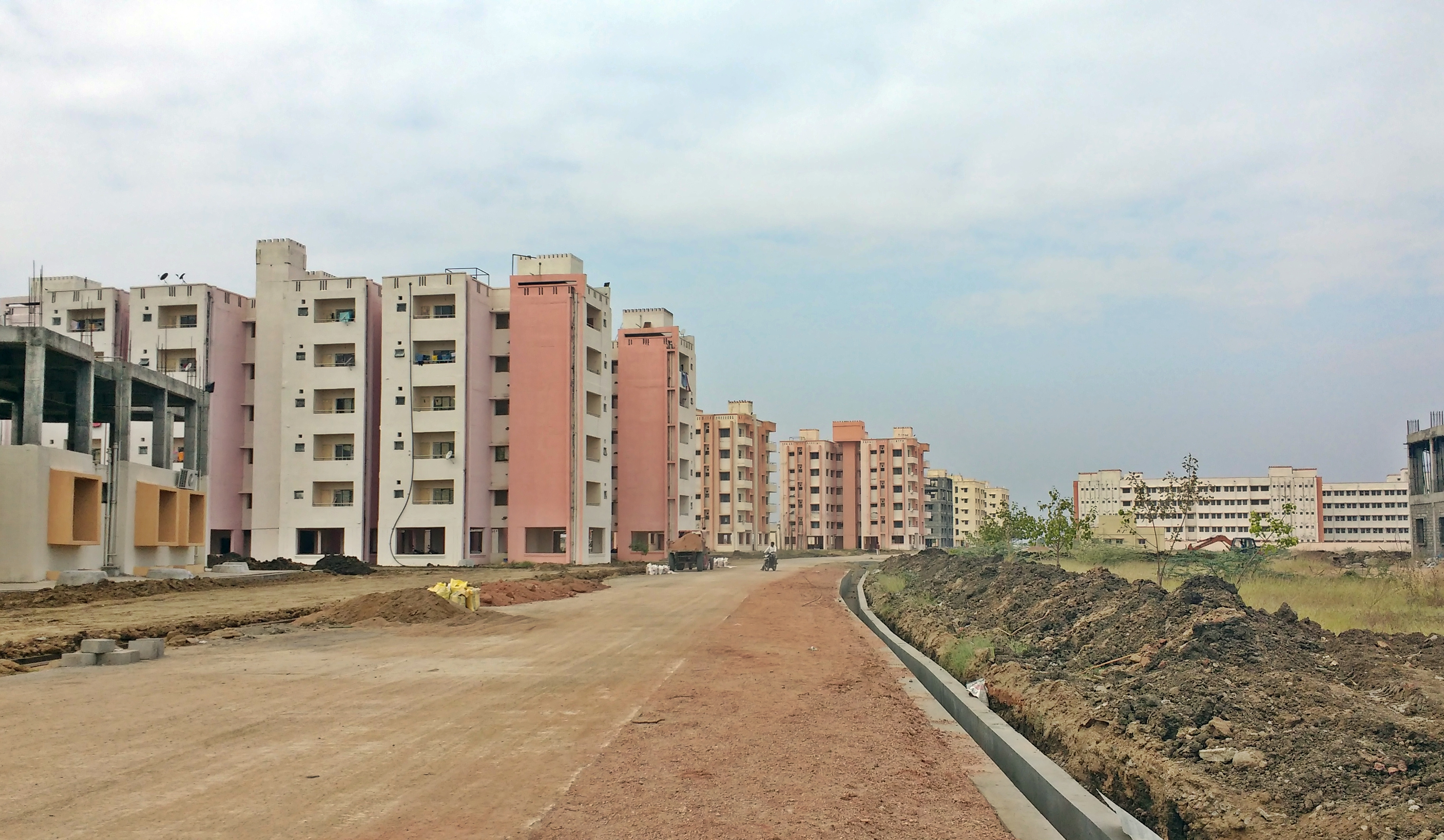
Residential Campuses at RGUKT, Basar

== Universities ==
- Telangana University
- Rajiv Gandhi University of Knowledge Technologies (referred as IIIT Basar)

== Private engineering colleges ==
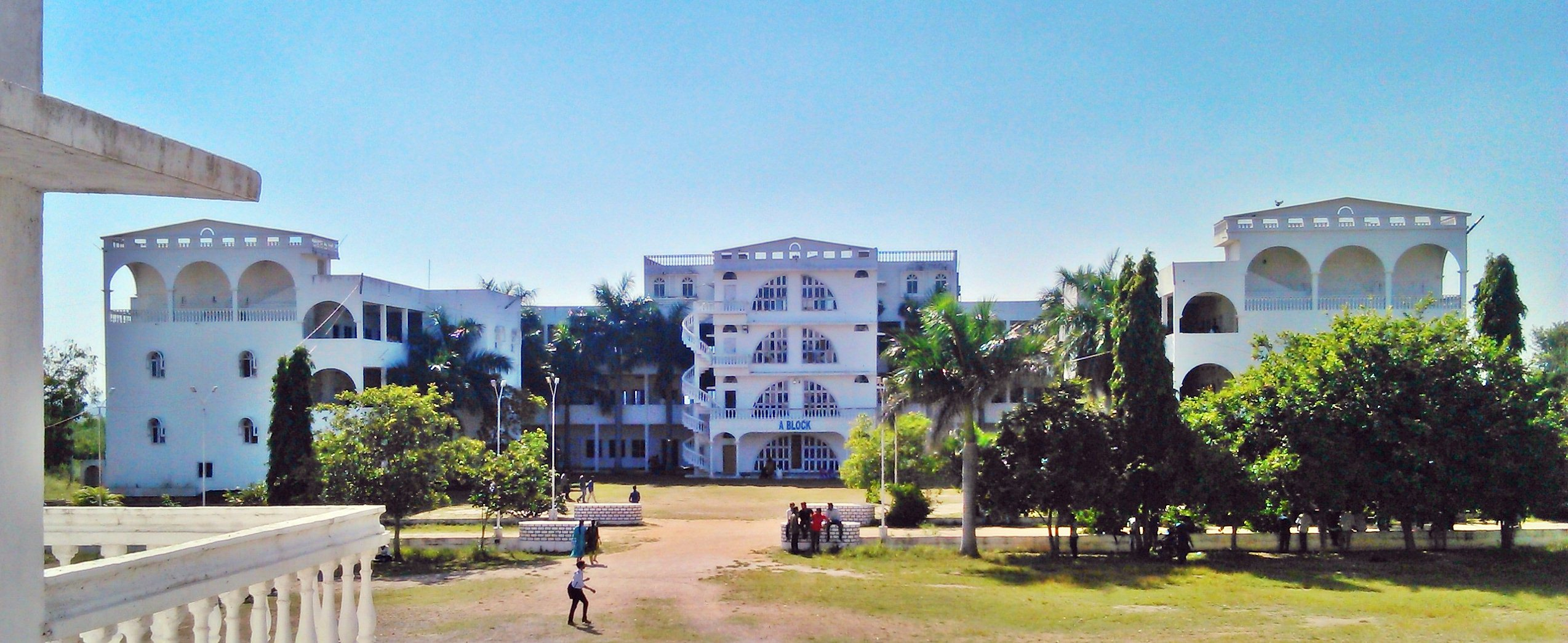
VREC, A Block, Nizamabad

College	Location
Kshatriya College of Engineering, Armoor (KCEA)	Chepur Road, Armoor
Vijay Rural Engineering College (VREC)	Rochis Valley, Nizamabad
Arkay College of Engineering and Technology	Bodhan
Tirumala Integrated Campus	Dharmaram, Nizamabad
Kakatiya Institute of Technology & Science for Women	Manikbhandar, Nizamabad
Vijay Institute of Technology & Sciences	Kamareddy
Kamareddy Engineering College	Devanpally, Kamareddy
Sudheer Reddy College of Engineering & Technology for Women	Keshpur Village, Nizamabad, Telangana
Srinivas Reddy Institute of Technology	Jakranpally, Armoor Telangana

== Medical colleges ==
- Government Medical College
- Christian Medical College
- Meghna Institute of Dental Sciences (MIDS)
- Tirumala College of Nursing
- Vishal Paramedical Institute
- Government ITI College

== Private pharmacy colleges ==
- Ganga Pharmacy college
- Tirumala Pharmacy college
- Vijay Pharmacy college

== Education colleges ==
- Kakatiya B.Ed. College
- Indur College of Education
- Vijay College of Education
- Katipally Ravinder Reddy College of Education
- St Thomas College of Education
- Priyadarshini College of Education
- Sri Chaitanya College of Education
- S.S.B.S B.Ed. College
- Pragathi College of Education
- Azaan College of Education
- University College of Education

== UG & PG Degree colleges ==
Colleges affiliated with Telangana University:

=== Undergraduate ===
- Gautami Degree College (Telangana University)
- Girraj Government College (Autonomous)
- Government Degree Colleges
- Nalanda Degree College for Women
- MSR Degree College
- Nishitha Degree & PG College
- Women's College
- Care Degree College
- CSI Degree College
- Government Arts and Science College
- SSR Degree College
- Pragathi Degree College
- Adarsha Hindi Maha Vidyalaya
- Gnyana Saraswathi Degree College
- Vijay Institute of Management
- Kshatriya Degree College
- Vaagdevi Degree College
- Nishitha Commerce And Science College

=== Post-Graduate ===
- Girraj Govt. College (Autonomous)
- Nishitha PG College (Osmania University)
- Nishitha College of Arts & Management
- Telangana University College of Law
- Government PG Colleges
- S.S.R. Degree College
- Women's Degree College
- University College, Main Campus
- University College, South Campus
- Gauthami PG College
- Indur College of Management
- St. Thomas College of Management
- Gnyana Saraswathi College of Management
- Vijetha Degree & PG College
- Vijay Degree & PG College
- Vashista Degree & PG College
- SRNK Govt. Degree College
- Siddhartha Degree College

== Intermediate colleges ==
- Kakatiya Junior College

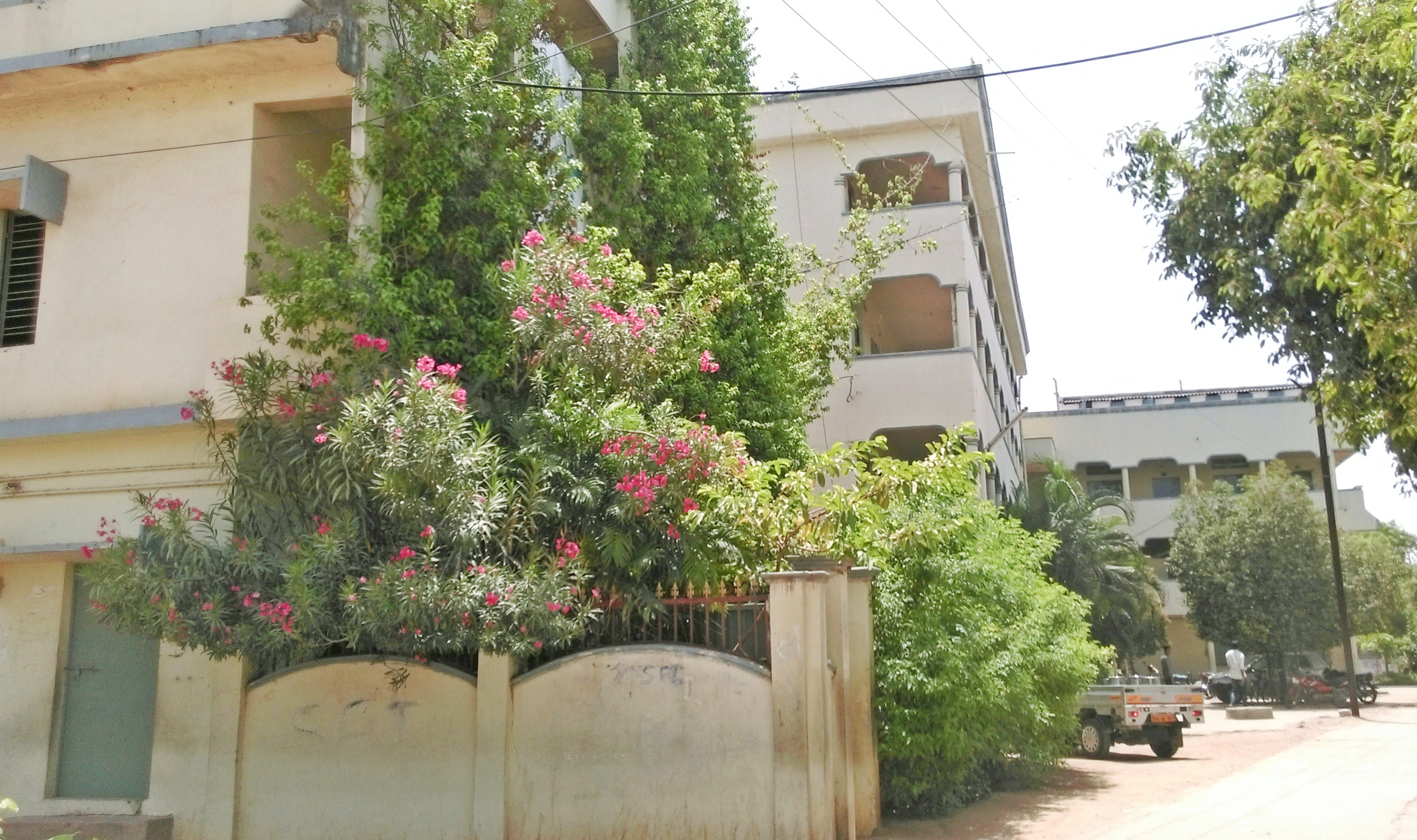
Kakatiya Junior College

- Shaankary Junior College
- Nirmala Hrudaya College for Girls
- Government Jr College for Boys
- Vagdevi Jr College
- Government Jr College for Girls
- CSI Junior College
- Goutami Jr College
- Vishwashanti Junior College
- Golden Jubilee Jr College
- Crescent Jr College for Girls
- Narayana Jr College
- Kakatiya Mahila College
- Anwar-Ul-Uloom College
- Vijay Jr College
- Women's Junior College
- MSR Jr College
- Saraswati Jr College
- Vani Vocational Junior College
- A.P.R.Jr.College (Urdu) for Boys

== High schools ==
- Raghava high school
- Sacred Heart Academy
- Kakatiya High School
- Crescent High School u/m & e/m
- Nirmala Hrudaya School for Girls
- Vishwa Vikas High School (VVHS)
- Vasudha High School. Dubba
- Vijay High School
- Navya Bharati Global School (NGS)(CBSE)
- St Francis De Sales’ High School (SFS)
- Goutam Model High School (GMS)
- Golden Jubilee High School (u/m & e/m)
- Knowledge Park International School (CBSE(ICSE)
- National High School (u/m)
- Noble High School
- Nilofar High School
- MSR High School
- St Theresa School
- RBVRR High School
- SSR Discovery Academy (CBSE)
- Victory High School
- Wood Bridge
- Modern High School
- Sunflower High School
- Blooming Buds High School (CBSE)
- Martinet High School
- St Xavier's High School
- Presidency High School
- Public High School (u/m)
- Vasavi Spaes School (CBSE)
- Vignan High School
- Orchid High School

== See also ==
- List of educational institutions in Telangana
- List of educational institutions in Nanded (India)
