= Kakatiya Institutions =

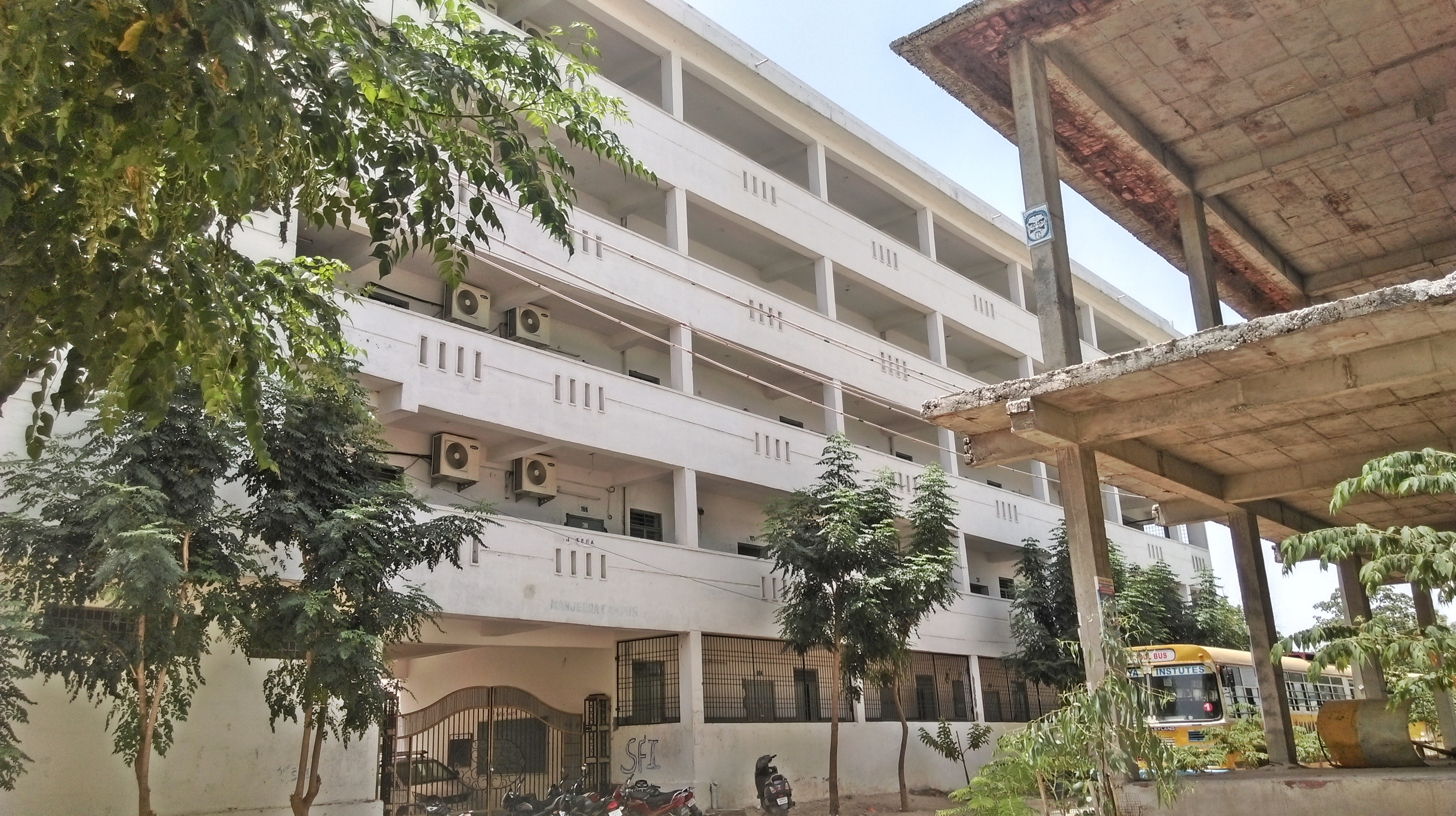
- Kakatiya High School and IIT academy

Location
- Pragathi Nagar Beside Joyalukkas; Pragati Nagar; Nizamabad, Telangana, 503003; India

Information
- Motto: Discipline & Dedication
- Chairman: Cherukuri Vijayalakshmi
- Campus: Urban

Kakatiya Institutions is the group of private educational institutions comprising High schools, IIT foundation academy, Intermediate College and a Women's Engineering College based in Nizamabad, Telangana, India. They have been consistently getting high rankings in the state.

== History ==
Kakatiya High School was established in 1993 with both English and Telugu as medium of instruction. The original high school campus, established in 1993 in Pragathi Nagar was affiliated to state board SSC. Later, keeping in view the needs of the students aspiring to opt for Engineering and Medical stream of syllabus, a project to establish an Intermediate college wing was initiated. Kakatiya Institute of Technology for Women was established in 2009.

== Campus ==
Most of the campuses are located in Pragathi nagar and one in Subash Nagar area of Nizamabad. Both the Intermediate College and residential campus are in Pragathi nagar. The engineering college Kakatiya Institute of Technology for Women (KITW) is located at Manikbhandar in Nizamabad.

- Kakatiya Public School
- Kakatiya High School for Boys and Girls (Manjeera Campus)
- Kakatitya IIT Foundation
- Kakatiya Junior College (Ganga Campus)
- Kakatiya Mahila Junior College (Godavari Campus)
- Kakatiya IIT Academy
- Kakatiya Boys Residential Block (Krishna Campus)
- Kakatiya Girls Residential Block (Yamuna Campus)
- Kakatiya Saraswati Campus
- Kakatiya Institute of Technology for Women

== Gallery ==
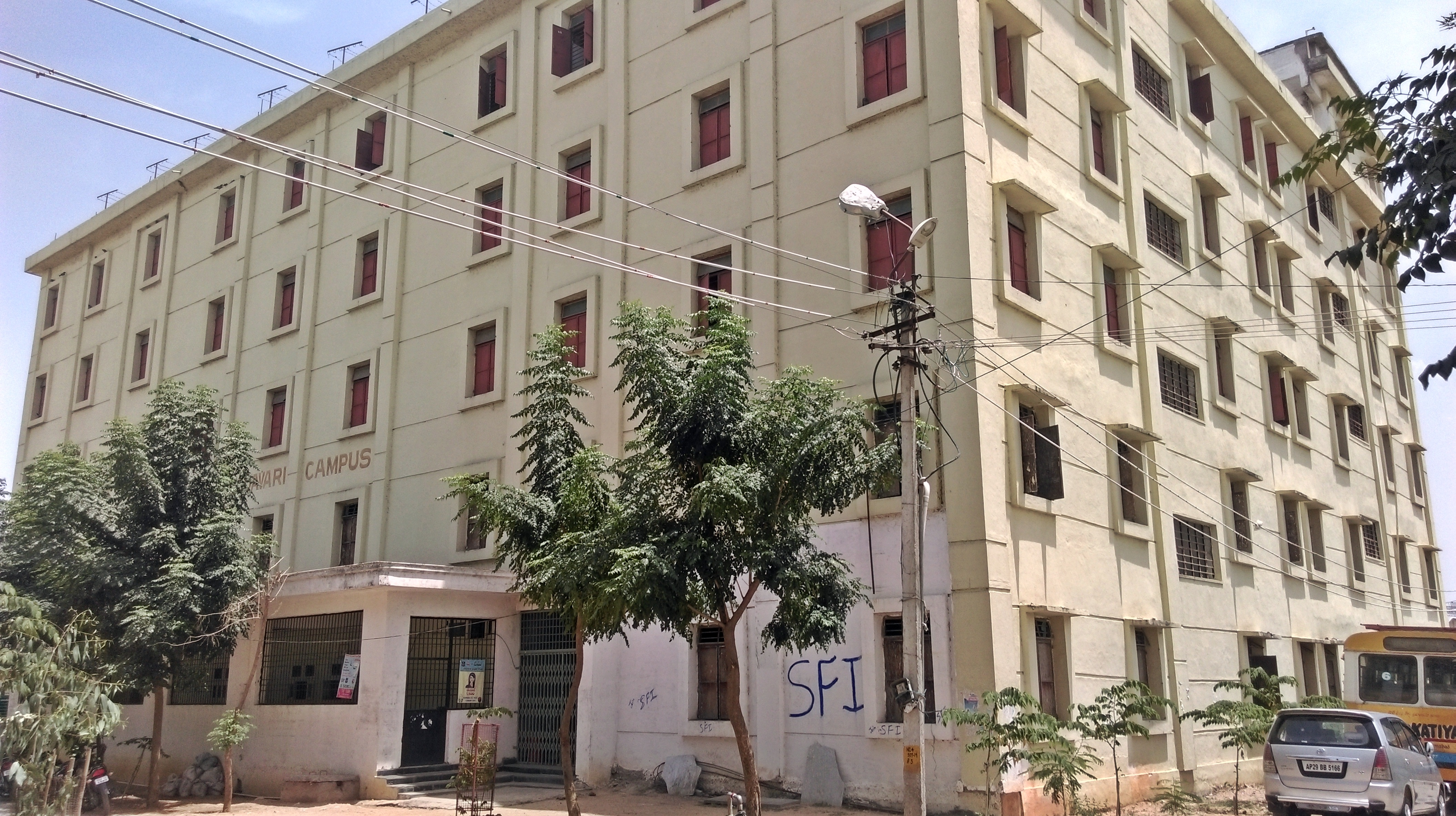
Kakatiya Mahila Junior College

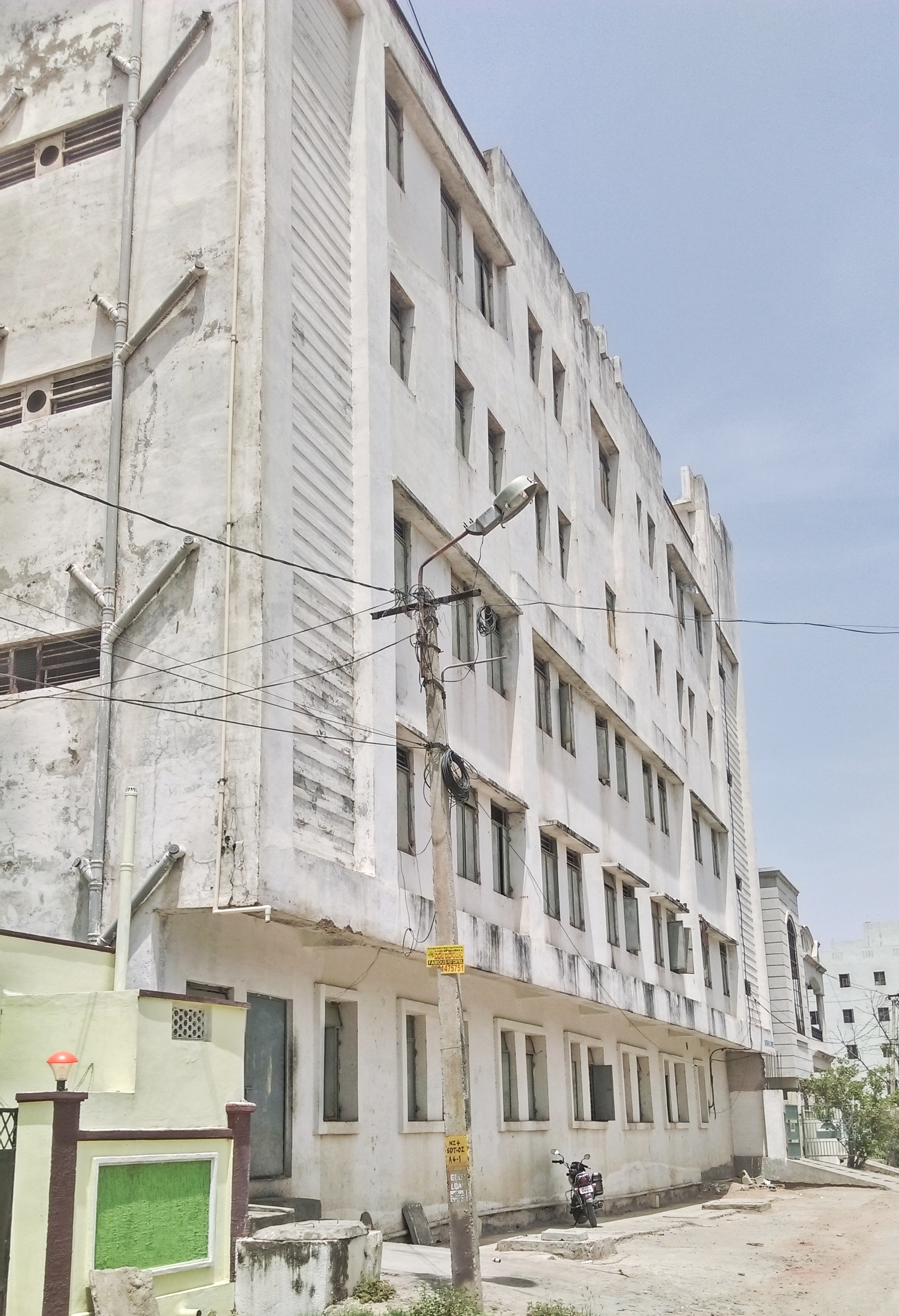

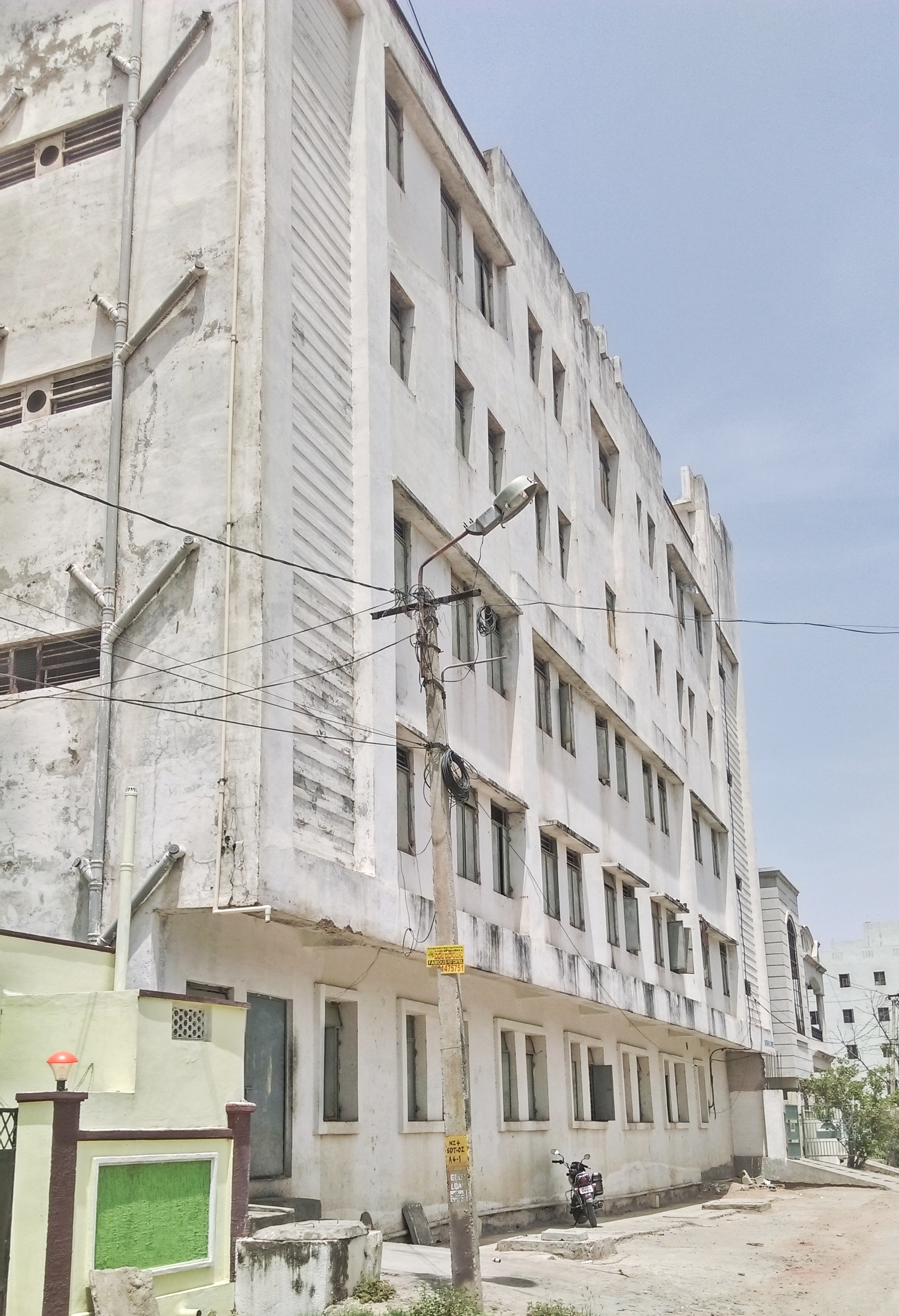

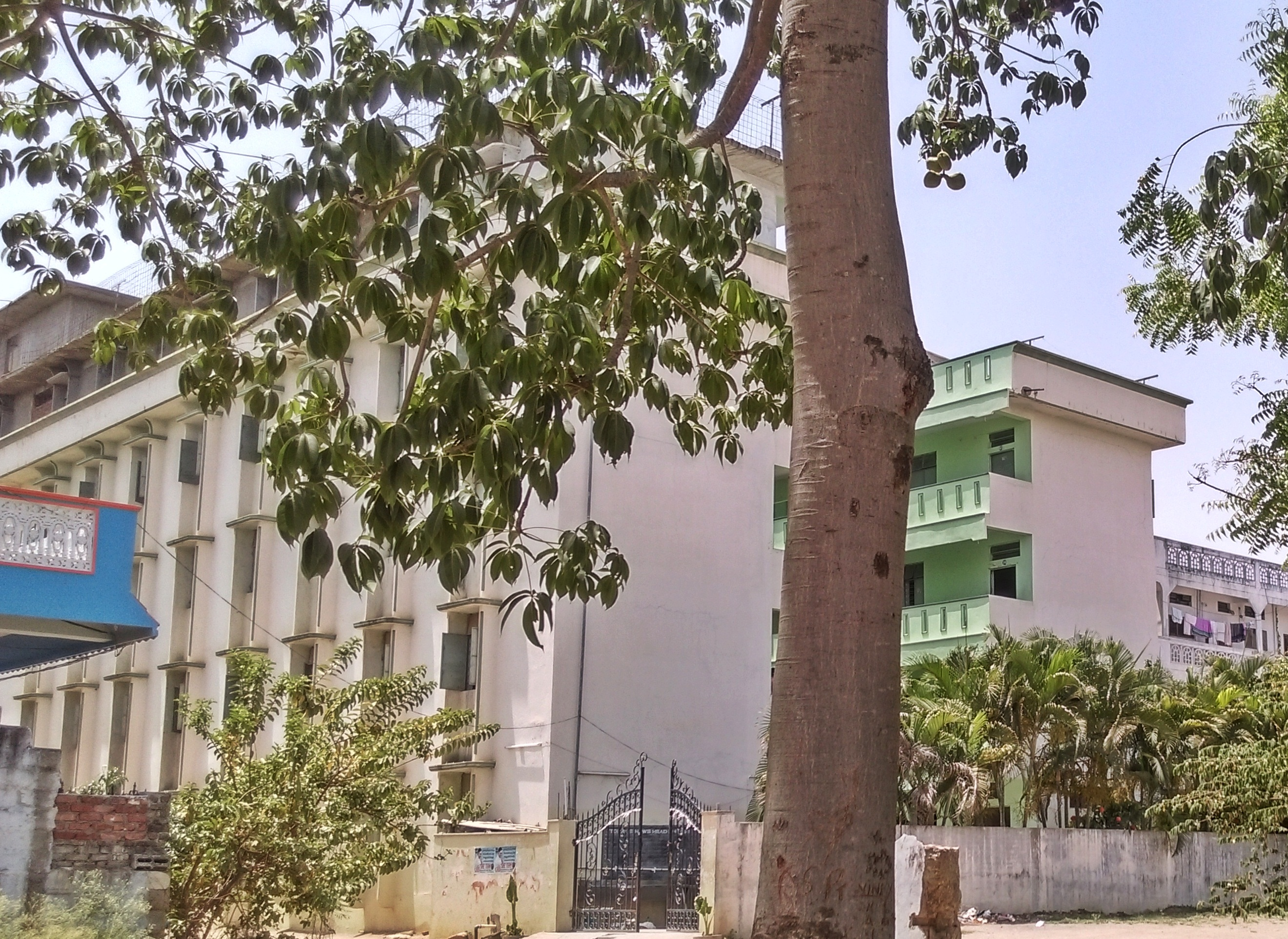
Kakatiya Girls Residential Block

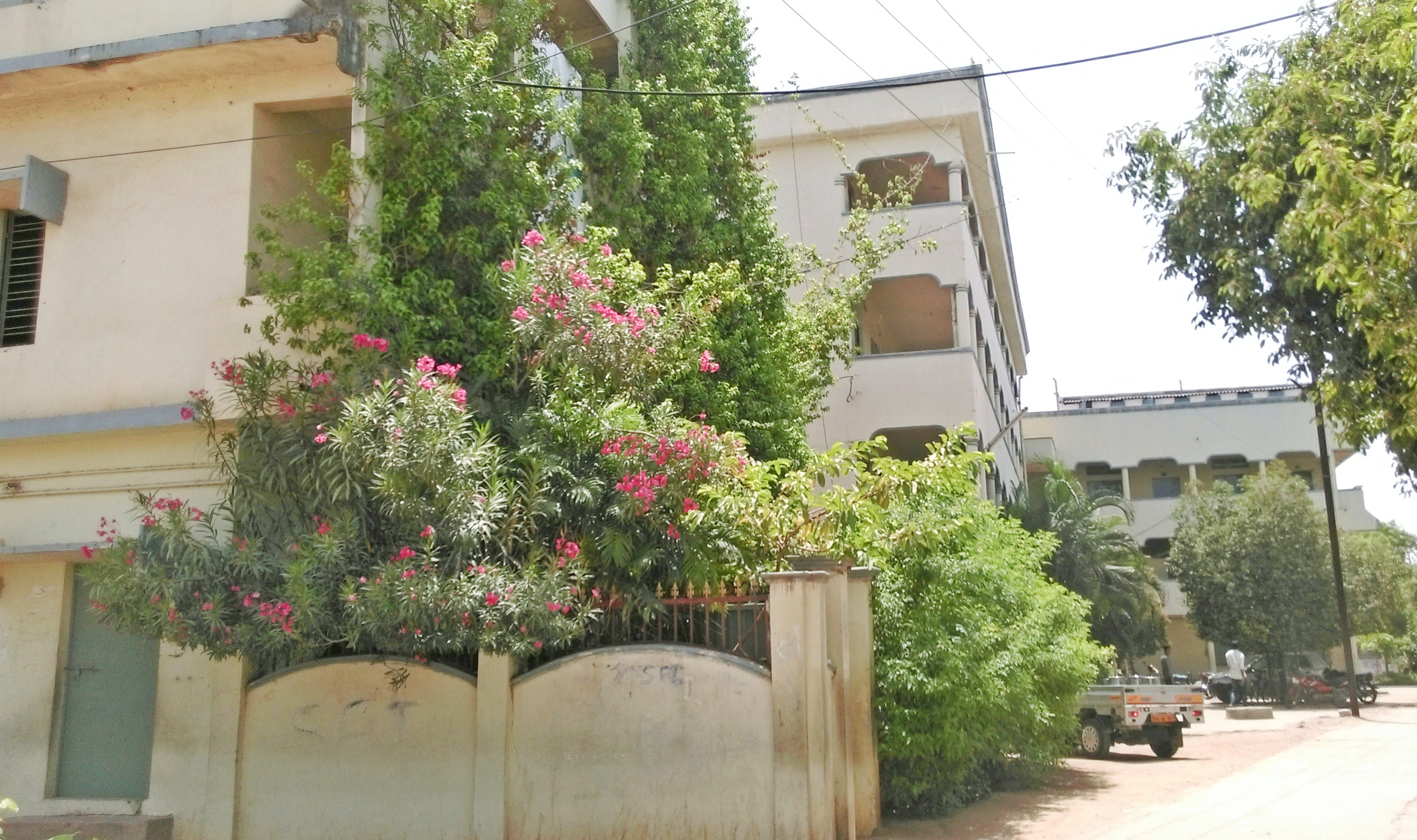
Kakatiya Junior College

== See also ==
- Vijay Rural Engineering College (VREC)
- List of educational institutions in Nizamabad
