= SGGS =

SGGS may refer to:

- Sri Guru Granth Sahib or Guru Granth Sahib
- Shri Guru Gobind Singhji or Guru Gobind Singh
  - Shri Guru Gobind Singhji Institute of Engineering and Technology, Nanded, Maharashtra, India
- St. George's Girls' School
- Stratford Girls' Grammar School
