= Government College of Engineering, Chhatrapati Sambhajinagar =

- Other name: G.E.C.A
- Former names: Government College of Engineering, Aurangabad
- Motto: In Pursuit of Technical Excellence
- Type: Technical education and Research institution
- Established: 1960
- Affiliations: UGC, NAAC, AICTE
- Principal: Dr. Sanjay Dambhare
- Location: Aurangabad, Maharashtra, India; 19°52′0.38″N 75°19′24.1″E
- Website: geca.ac.in
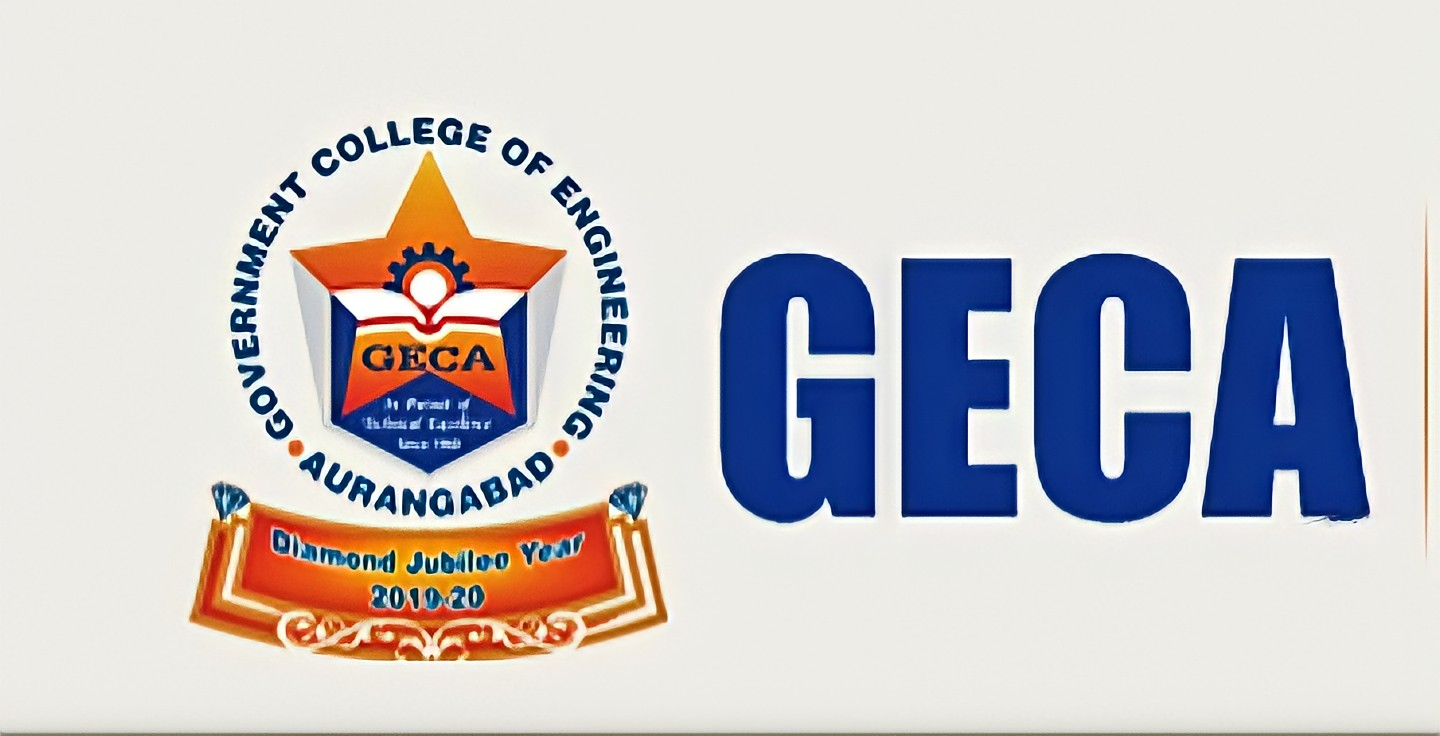

Government College of Engineering, Chhatrapati Sambhajinagar (GECA) formerly known as Government College of Engineering, Aurangabad is an autonomous engineering Institute in Maharashtra state of India. It is affiliated with the Dr. Babasaheb Ambedkar Marathwada University and was established in 1960. The construction of the college was started in 1957 and was completed in 1960. Later on, it included the extension building that presently houses the Electronics and Telecommunication Department, Computer Science Engineering Department and Master of Computer Application Department. The recently constructed classroom complex houses the classes of first year students of all branches along with the Information Technology Department.

== Departments ==
=== Civil engineering ===
Civil engineering is a traditional branch of engineering and is amongst the founding courses when the institution was started. The department is located in the 'Annexe' building of the college. The Department of Civil Engineering conducts both full time and part time undergraduate courses in Civil engineering. It also conducts a postgraduate programme in Water Resources Engineering, Structural Engineering, and a part time Post-Graduate programme in Soil Engineering.

=== Electronics and telecommunication engineering ===
The Department of E&TC started U.G. Course B.E.(E&TC) in 1986 with sanctioned intake of 40, enhanced to 60 in 1996. Department also runs full time Post Graduate Course M.E. (EC) and Recognized Research centre leading to Ph.D. (Electronics Engineering). Part time BE (E&TC) and part time ME (EC) are also run to give opportunity to working graduates and diploma holders.

=== Computer science and engineering ===
The Department of CSE started U.G. Course B.E.(CSE) in 1986 with a sanctioned intake of 40, later enhanced to 60 in 1996. The department also runs the full-time postgraduate course M.E. (CSE) and Recognized Research centre leading to Ph.D. (computer science and engineering). Part time BE (CSE) and part time ME (CSE) are also run to give the opportunity to working graduates and diploma holders.

== Student life ==
=== Team Cybrotics (Robotics Club Of GECA) ===
Team Cybrotics of Government College of Engineering, Aurangabad is a group of robotics enthusiasts who have been fabricating robots since 2010. They have been participating in ABU Robocon, an International Robotic Contest for last 9 years. The National level competition (Robocon India) of ABU Robocon is being organised by Doordarshan and the winner of this national level competition gets the chance to represent India at the international level.

=== Team Techrovers ===
The Team Techrovers of Government College of Engineering, Aurangabad is a team of students working in the field of robotics and automation since 2019. This team has worked on many UAVs, open source robots, EVs, and combat robotics, earning awards including state and national level prizes.

== See also ==
Other Government Engineering Colleges (GECs) in Maharashtra:

- College of Engineering, Pune
- Government College of Engineering, Amravati
- Government College of Engineering, Chandrapur
- Government College of Engineering, Karad
- Shri Guru Gobind Singhji Institute of Engineering and Technology, Nanded
- Veermata Jijabai Technological Institute, Mumbai
