= Akula Lalitha =

Indian politician (born 1965)

Akula Lalitha (born 8 December 1965) was an Indian politician from Telangana. She was a member of the Andhra Pradesh Legislative Assembly from Dichpalli Assembly constituency in Nizamabad district representing the Indian National Congress, winning the 2008 bypoll.

== Early life and education ==
Lalitha is from Manikbhandar village, Makloor mandal, Nizamabad district, Telangana State. She was the daughter of Hanumanthu and Suguna. She married Akula Raghavender. She completed her graduation in arts at a college affiliated with Osmania University.

== Career ==
Lalitha entered politics in 2001 when she got elected as MPTC member of Makloor mandal. In 2003, she served as a member of the Mandal Praja Parishad. She was the president of the Nizamabad District Congress Committee for eight years from 2005 to 2013 and was also as served as the general secretary of the All India Mahila Congress, the women wing of the Congress Party. In 2015, she was elected as a Member of the Legislative Council as an Indian National Congress nominee but soon shifted to Telangana Rashtra Samithi. In 2009, she declared assets worth Rs.1 crore before contesting the Assembly polls. In 2018 Telangana Legislative Assembly election from Armur Assembly constituency she lost to A Jeevan Reddy of Bharath Rashtra Samithi. But later, unexpectedly joined BRS. In October 2023, she rejoined Congress following the Ghar Wapsi call given by Congress leader Rahul Gandhi.
