= Government College of Engineering, Amravati =

College in Amravati

Coordinates: 20°57′30.85″N 77°45′28.94″E

- Motto: Towards Global Technological Excellence
- Type: Public
- Established: 1964; 62 years ago
- Accreditation: NAAC B+
- Chairman: Dr. Sachin Mandvgane
- Principal: Prof. Dr. A. M. Mahalle
- Academic staff: 73
- Students: 1895
- Location: VMV Road, Kathora Naka, Amravati, Maharashtra, 444604, India
- Campus: Urban
- Website: www.gcoea.ac.in

Government College of Engineering, Amravati (GCOEA) is an autonomous engineering college affiliated to Sant Gadge Baba Amravati University in Amravati, Maharashtra, India. Established in 1964, it is one of the oldest engineering institutes in state of Maharashtra. Beside engineering education, it is a recognized research center for Ph.D Programs in Civil, Mechanical, Electrical, Electronics and Computer Engineering for Amravati University. The student strength is around 1,800.

== History ==
The college was established in 1964 by the Government of Maharashtra, along with other three Government colleges at Pune, Aurangabad, and Karad. It was initially affiliated to Nagpur University and later on shifted to Amravati University in 1982. The Institute started with three basic disciplines Civil, Mechanical and Electrical Engineering initially. Subsequently, degree programs in Electronic & Telecommunication, Computer Science & Engineering, Instrumentation Engineering and Information Technology were added as per the demand and requirements of the country. The institute started part-time post graduate course in Electrical Power System in 1986 and later added four P.G. Courses in Thermal Power Engineering, Environmental, Geotechnical, and Electronics Systems and Communication. The institute also offers seven full-time PG programs in Electrical Power Systems, Structures, Thermal Power Engineering., Environmental Engineering., Advanced Electronics, Computer Engineering and Geotechnical Engineering.

== Academic autonomy ==
The institute was granted Autonomy by UGC in 2005–06. All eligible programs have been accredited by NBA . Autonomy has been extended by UGC till 2019-20 .

== Campus ==
College campus is spread over 114 acres of land on Amravati Walgaon road. Public Work Department is responsible for construction and maintenance of buildings. Every department has its own building. The institute has plans for five more department buildings of 9000 sq. m. area.

=== Hostel ===
The college provides separate boys' and girls' hostels. There are two girls hostels-

- New Girls Hostel (established in 2014)
- Jijau Girls Hostel (established in 1994, intake capacity of 248)

and two boys hostels-

- Sahyadri boys hostel (established in 1981, intake capacity of 180)
- Satpuda boys hostel (established in 1980, intake capacity of 180)
- New Boys hostel (established in 2018, intake capacity of 160)

Hostel admission is merit based. The institute has also planned two more hostels for girls and boys each.

== Departments ==
GCOEA provides undergraduate as well as postgraduate education. There are total seven branches, listed by order of establishment:

- Civil Engineering (1964)
- Electrical and Power Engineering (1964)
- Mechanical Engineering (1964)
- Electronics and Telecommunication Engineering (1986)
- Computer Science and Engineering (1986)
- Instrumentation Engineering (1996)
- Information Technology (2001)

== Festivals ==
The students arrange two annual festivals, a technical festival call Prajwalan and a cultural festival called Zenith.

== See also ==
Other Government Engineering Colleges (GEC's) in Maharashtra

- College of Engineering, Pune
- Government College of Engineering, Aurangabad
- Government College of Engineering, Chandrapur
- Government College of Engineering, Karad
- Government College of Engineering, Jalgaon
- Shri Guru Gobind Singhji Institute of Engineering and Technology, Nanded
- Veermata Jijabai Technological Institute, Mumbai,
- Walchand College of Engineering, Sangli
- Government College Of Engineering College, Yavatmal
