= Anand Patil =

Anand Balwant Patil
- Born: 3 July 1945 (age 81); Maharashtra, India
- Education: Shivaji University
- Occupations: Writer, literary critic, translator, academic
- Writing career
- Language: Marathi, English
- Genres: Rural fiction, literary criticism, comparative literature
- Subjects: Postcolonial literature, cultural studies, comparative literature
- Notable works: Icchamaran; Kagud ani Shavali; Patalachi Londonwari
- Notable awards: Government of Maharashtra literary awards (multiple)

Anand Balwant Patil (born 3 July 1945) is a Marathi and English creative writer, postcolonial, comparatist, culturalist translator–scholar from Maharashtra, India. Starting with his debut rural novellas and research on the ‘Western Influences on Marathi Drama 1818-1947’ Patil set new trends in rural fiction. His Icchamarn is the compendious epic novel on a village. It is regarded as a masterpiece of gramin (rural) fiction. He is the recipient of four Government of Maharashtra Awards for extraordinary literary works and also thirteen other literary awards. He is the founder of Aranyanand Shikshan, Sahitya va Sanskriti Pratisthan and Anand Granthsagar Prkashan.

== Education ==
Patil was born on 3 July 1945 in a remote village in the range of Sahyadri Mountain in Maharashtra. He joined the ‘Earn and Learn’ scheme of Karmveer Bhaurao Patil and received Merit scholarship for M.A. in Entire English from shivaji university Kolhapur, Maharashtra. The UGC Teachership and British council visitorship enabled him to submit the meritorious Ph.D. dissertation which was published both in English and Marathi.

== Career ==
Dr. Patil has contributed immensely in field of education and literature. His contributions are shortly elaborated here.

=== Teaching ===
Patil taught English language and Literature in various colleges of Rayat Shikshan Sanstha for 24 years and later comparative Literature and creative writing in Department of English, Goa University and school of Languages and Literature in Swami Ramanand Teerth Marathwada University, Nanded. After retirement he was the visiting Professor of Delhi University, Patan and Nagpur University.

=== Literary career ===
Patil’s first short story ‘Khep' published in the prestigious periodical ‘Satyakatha’ (1971) and novella Kagud in 'Mouji' (1984) earned him the nickname ‘Kagudwala’ Patil given by stalwart fictionist Shankar Patil. He was described as "a rising sun of Marathi rural writing" due to his autobiographical element and mastery of rural language.

After Patil joined Goa University as a Reader in English he published several works including publishing articles in Ariel, comparative and culture studies, Oxford and Cambridge Companions in the Western countries. Patil ventured where no Marathi Marathi writer had ever trod . He was turned down by those so called scholars who had never published a single book in Maharashtra. This cultural tuen made him the leading comparatist and culturalist in India who went abroad for seven times on the academic tours. His book on 'Comparative Literature :Theory and practice' translated in to Hindi is a text book all over India. Whatever genre he tried he made his work. For example, his ‘Patalachi Londanvari’ translated in to Kannada and Hindi is considered the first true travel writing of the marginal Indian, and ‘In search of my Kolhapur’ the first travel of a District, ‘Granthani Rachlela Mahapurush’ a first literary biography and so on. As a creative writer he is Ngugi wa Thiong'o of Marathi and as a culturalist –comparatist he is Raymond Williams of India.

== Bibliography ==
=== Novels ===
1. Kagud ani Shavali. Murusai :Mouji,1986
2. Icchamaran. Aurangabad:Saket, 2008

=== Short story collection ===
1. Phugaaya. Aurangabad:Sket 1994
2. Dawan. Aurangabad: Sahityaseva. 1998
3. Suparna vrakshyakhali Bhav dupari. Aurangabad: Rajat 2006
4. Phera. Pune: Pshpa 2006
5. KhandaniPune: Snehwardhan 2011
6. Shodh Eka chalwalya Mitracha. Kolhapur. Ajab210

=== Travel Writing ===
1. Patalachi Londonwari, Mumbai: Lok wangmay (1993) trams in Kannada by Sathkad and Hindi by Shailesh Pandey
2. Paradeshi Saha Parikrama. Pune: Suvidhya 2003.
3. In search of my Kolhapur through Travellers eyes: Amsela Associated Publishers

=== Literary Biography ===
1. Granthani Rachalels Mahapurush: Yashvantrao Chavan. Kolhapur: Anand Granthsagar, 2018.
2. Maharashtrala Mahit Naslele Samrat Shivaji. Kolhapur: Anand Granthsagar,2018

=== Drama ===
1. Sangeet Automatic Asud. Kolhapur : Anand Granthsager

=== Translation ===
1. P.S. Deshmukh. The Origin and Development of Religion in vedic literature. London Oxford Univ-Press 1933, train in to Marathi Dhrmacha Vaidek Wangmayatil udhay ani vikas: Kolhapur Anand Granthsagar 2005
2. Basavraj Naikar, Light in the House. Trans in to Marathi Urus, Pune: Datta Prakashan 2005

=== Marathi Comparative and Cultural Studies ===
1. Marathi Natakawaril Ingraji Prabhav. Mumbai : Lokwangmay 1993
2. Taulanik Sahitya : Nave Siddhhant ani upyojan. Aurangabad :Saket 1998. Translated in to Hindi by Chandrlekha
3. British Bombay ani Portuguese Govyateel Wangmay. Mumbai: Granthali1999
4. Tulav: Tanlanik Nibandh. Mumbai:ranthali, 2002
5. Sahitya Kahi Deshi Kahi Videsh. Pune: Patmaandha 2004
6. Tharava. Nagpur Akanksha 2005
7. Teekavamarsh. Aurngabad : Rajat 2010
8. Samiksha Up Haran. Aurangabad Rajat 2010
9. Sahitya vimarsh Maranam . Pune Diamond 2011
10. Samagra Shakespeare: Taulanik Sanskrti Samiksha. Kolhapur : Anand Granthsager 2017
11. Samagra S. S. Mardhekar: Taulanik Sanskrati Mimam -nsa, Pune: Padmagandha, 2018
12. Local and Global, Kolhapur Anand Granthsager 2019
13. Kahi Lobel kahi Globel Anand Granthsagar 2019

=== English Comparative Literature and Cultural Studies ===
1. Western Influence on Marathi Drama. Panaji Rajhanus. 1993
2. Whirligig of Taste: Essays in Comparative Literature Delhi: Creative Books 1999
3. Perspectives and Progression. Delhi Creative Books 2005
4. ddhas Shelke: Makers of Indian Literature. New Delhi: Sahitya Academy 2002
5. Revisioning Comparative Literature and Culture Delhi: Authors Press 2011
6. Literary Comparative Literative and Cultural Criticism. Foreworeded by Steehen Tostory de Zeptne. Ambala : Associated Press 2011
7. Interdisciplinary : Literary and Cultural. Kolhapur: Anand Granthsagar 2019

== Literary Awards and Appreciation Received by Patil ==
=== Awards ===
1. H.N. Apte Award for Kagud ani Savali: Government of Maharashtra H.N. Apte Award, M.S. Parishad, Pune H.N .Apte Award. Best novel of the Decade Selection by Maharashtra Times (1986)
2. Pune Nagar Wachanalay S.J. Joshi Awards, for Icchamaran. Balapur Library Kondaji Patil Purskar (2008)
3. SKK Purskar. Taulanik Sahitya: Nave Siddhant ani Uptojan. Government of Maharashtra SKK Purskar.
4. M.V. Gokhale Award. Marathi Natkawaril Ingraji prbhav, Maharashtra Sahitya Parishad Pune M.V. Gokhale Award (1998)
5. S.M. Paranjpe Award. British Bombay ani Portuguese Govyatil Wangmay .Maharashtra Sahitya Parishad Pune S.M. Paranjpe Award
6. Tulav: Tulanik Nibandh, Jansahitya parishad Amravati Award and Vidarbha Sahitya Sangh ugawani awards (1999)
7. Srajanatamak Lekhan, Government of Maharashtra Kusumavati Deshpande Award 2005
8. Teekvastraharan . Govt of Maharashtra SKK Awards and Dakshin Maharashtra Sahitya sabha R. Shahu Award 2008
9. Sahitya Vimarsh Maranam. Maharashtra Sahitya Parishad, H. S. Shenolikar Award 2011
10. Granthani Rachlela Mahapurush: Yashwantrao Chavan, Vidhrbh Itihas Sanshodhak Mandal, Nagpur, Freedom fighter Balaji Huddar Award. South Maharashtra Sahitya Sabha Kolhapur Annabhau Sathe Award, Maharashtra Sahitya Parishad Pune Phaltan branch Yashvantrao Chavan Sahitya Gaurav Purskar. Jaysingpur, Kavita Sagar Prkashan Rashitriya Award (2017)

== Critical Books Published on Patil’s Writings ==
1. Patlachi Londonwari: Kahi Drashtikshep ed: Shailesh Tribhuvan (2003)
2. Patlachia Phad: Samagra Samikshed . ed. Shrikrishna Asud (2011)
3. Anand Parva: Tulanik Sahityaani ani Sanskriti Samiksha, Ed Srikrishan Adsul (2014)
