= Wanegaon, Nanded =

Village in Maharashtra

Wanegaon
- Village/Railway station
- Location within Maharashtra Location within India
- Coordinates: 19°10′00″N 77°15′00″E
- Country: India
- State: Maharashtra
- District: Nanded

Government
  - Type: Gram panchayat

Population (2011)
  - Total: 644
- Demonym: Wanegaonkar

Languages
  - Official: Marathi
- Time zone: UTC+5:30 (IST)
- PIN: 431602
- Telephone code: 02462
- Vehicle registration: MH-26

Wanegaon is a village in Nanded taluka of Nanded district of the Indian state of Maharashtra. It is also a railway station on the Nanded-Aurangabad route. The village is 3 kilometres (1.9 mi) away from Nanded Airport.

== Demography ==
- As per 2011 census, Wanegaon has total 126 families residing. Village has population of 644 of which 336 were males while 308 were females.
- Average Sex Ratio of village is 917 which is lower than Maharashtra state average of 929.
- Literacy rate of village was 72% compared to 82.95% of Maharashtra. Male literacy rate was 88% while female literacy rate was 55%.
- Scheduled Caste people constitutes 21% of total population.

== Wanegaon Railway Station ==
Parameter	Detail
Station code	WNG
Zone	SCR (South Central)
Division	Hazur Sahib Nanded
District	Nanded
Halting Trains	14
Elevation	371 m
Track	Diesel

== Geography and Transport ==
Following table shows distance of Wanegaon from some of major cities.

City	Distance (km)
Nanded	01
Purna	32
Loha	33
Mukhed	57
Mudkhed	23
Hingoli	72
Nizamabad	110
Aurangabad	241
Mumbai	547
