= Limbgaon, Nanded =

Village in Maharashtra

Limbgaon
- Village/Railway station
- Location in Maharashtra Limbgaon (India)
- Coordinates: 19.1758533°N 77.2058014°E
- Country: India
- State: Maharashtra
- District: Nanded

Government
  - Type: Gram panchayat

Population (2011)
  - Total: 4,560
- Demonym: Limbgaonkar

Languages
  - Official: Marathi
- Time zone: UTC+5:30 (IST)
- PIN: 431602
- Telephone code: 02462
- Vehicle registration: MH-26

Limbgaon is a village and railway station in Nanded taluka of Nanded district of Indian state of Maharashtra. It is located 14 km away from Nanded.

== Demography ==
- As per 2011 census, Limbgaon has total 951 families residing. Village has population of 4,560 of which 2,375 were males while 2,185 were females.
- Average Sex Ratio of village is 920 which is lower than Maharashtra state average of 929.
- Literacy rate of village was 76.5% compared to 82.95% of Maharashtra. Male literacy rate was 87.3% while female literacy rate was 65%.
- Schedule Caste (SC) constitutes 24% of total population while Schedule Tribe was 0.2%.

== Limbgaon Railway Station ==
Parameter	Detail
Station code	LBG
Zone	SCR (South Central)
Division	Hazur Sahib Nanded
District	Nanded
Platforms	2
Halting Trains	16
Elevation	390 m
Track	Diesel

== Geography and Transport ==
Following table shows distance of Limbgaon from some of major cities.

City	Distance (km)
Nanded	14
Purna	18
Loha	29
Parbhani	49
Aurangabad	227
Mumbai	533
Hydrabad	296
