= Anand Tidke =

Indian politician

Anand Shankar Tidke (born 1982) is an Indian politician from Maharashtra. He is an MLA from Nanded South Assembly constituency in Nanded district. He won the 2024 Maharashtra Legislative Assembly election representing the Shiv Sena.

== Early life and education ==
Tidke is from Nanded, Maharashtra. He is the son of Shankar Bhajiram Tidke. He passed Class 12 but later discontinued studies after doing BA first year in 2015 through Yashwant Rao Chavan Maharashtra Open University, Nashik.

== Career ==
Tidke won from Nanded Assembly constituency representing the Shiv Sena in the 2024 Maharashtra Legislative Assembly election. He polled 60,445 votes and defeated his nearest rival, Mohanrao Marotrao Hambarde of the Indian National Congress, by a margin of 2,132 votes. Congress won the Nanded Lok Sabha seat but lost all the seats in the 2024 assembly election.
