= Nanded South Assembly constituency =

Constituency of the Maharashtra legislative assembly in India

Coordinates: 19.116°N 77.320°E

Nanded South Assembly नांदेड दक्षिण विधानसभा मतदारसंघ
- Constituency No. 87 for the Maharashtra Legislative Assembly

Constituency details
- Country: India
- Region: Western India
- State: Maharashtra
- Division: Aurangabad
- District: Nanded
- Lok Sabha constituency: Nanded Lok Sabha
- Established: 2008
- Total electors: 317,052
- Reservation: None

Member of Legislative Assembly
- 15th Maharashtra Legislative Assembly
- Incumbent Anand Tidke
- Party: SHS
- Alliance: NDA
- Elected year: 2024

Nanded South Assembly constituency is one of the 288 Vidhan Sabha (legislative assembly) constituencies of Maharashtra state, western India. This constituency is located in Nanded district.

== Geographical Scope ==
The delimitation of the constituency happened in 2008. It comprises parts of Loha taluka, the revenue circle of Sonkhed, parts of Nanded taluka, the revenue circle of Tuppa, Vishnupuri and the following wards of Nanded-Waghala Municipal Corporation: 10 to 27, 40 to 49, 59 to 65.

== Members of Legislative Assembly ==
| Year | Member | Party |
|---|---|---|
| 1952 | Raghwan Rao | Indian National Congress |
| 1957 | Vithalrao Deshpande | Communist Party of India |
| 1962 | Farook Pasha Makhdum Pasha | Indian National Congress |
| 1967 | Farook Pasha Makhdum Pasha | Indian National Congress |
| 1972 | Farook Pasha Makhdum Pasha | Indian National Congress |
| 1978 | Noorallah Khan Bismillah Khan | Janata Party |
| 1980 | Kamalkishor Kadam | Indian National Congress (U) |
| 1985 | Kamalkishor Kadam | Indian Congress (Socialist) |
| 1990 | D. R. Deshmukh | Shiv Sena |
| 1995 | Prakash Khedkar | Shiv Sena |
| 1999 | Prakash Khedkar | Shiv Sena |
| 2004 | Anusayatai Khedkar | Shiv Sena |
Before 2008 : See Nanded
| 2009 | Omprakash Pokarna | Indian National Congress |
| 2014 | Hemant Patil | Shiv Sena |
| 2019 | Mohanrao Hambarde | Indian National Congress |
| 2024 | Anand Tidke | Shiv Sena |

== Election results ==
=== Assembly Election 2024 ===
2024 Maharashtra Legislative Assembly election : Nanded South
| Party | Candidate | Votes | % | ±% |
|---|---|---|---|---|
| SS | Anand Tidke | 60,445 | 29.68 | ▲9.31 |
| INC | Mohanrao Marotrao Hambarde | 58,313 | 28.63 | ▲2.84 |
| VBA | Farooque Ahmed | 33,841 | 16.61 | ▲1.94 |
| Independent | Dilip Venkatrao Kandakurte | 17,170 | 8.43 | New |
| AIMIM | Syed Moin Syed Mukhtar | 15,396 | 7.56 | ▼3.50 |
| Independent | Sanjay Shivajirao Ghogare | 14,282 | 7.01 | New |
| NOTA | None of the Above | 552 | 0.27 | ▼0.16 |
| Margin of victory | | 2,132 | 1.05 | ▼0.93 |
| Turnout | | 204,241 | 64.42 | ▲0.40 |
| Total valid votes | | 203,689 | | |
| Registered electors | | 317,052 | | ▲11.20 |
| SS gain from INC | | Swing | ▲3.89 | |

=== Assembly Election 2019 ===
2019 Maharashtra Legislative Assembly election : Nanded South
| Party | Candidate | Votes | % | ±% |
|---|---|---|---|---|
| INC | Mohanrao Marotrao Hambarde | 46,943 | 25.79 | ▲7.51 |
| Independent | Dilip Venkatrao Kandkurte | 43,351 | 23.82 | New |
| SS | Rajshri Hemant Patil | 37,066 | 20.36 | ▼6.02 |
| VBA | Farukh Ahemad Iqbal Ahemad | 26,713 | 14.68 | New |
| AIMIM | Mohammad Saber Chaus | 20,122 | 11.05 | ▼8.86 |
| NOTA | None of the Above | 788 | 0.43 | ▲0.15 |
| Margin of victory | | 3,592 | 1.97 | ▲0.13 |
| Turnout | | 182,846 | 64.13 | ▲6.12 |
| Total valid votes | | 182,028 | | |
| Registered electors | | 285,122 | | ▼5.28 |
| INC gain from SS | | Swing | ▼0.59 | |

=== Assembly Election 2014 ===
2014 Maharashtra Legislative Assembly election : Nanded South
| Party | Candidate | Votes | % | ±% |
|---|---|---|---|---|
| SS | Hemant Patil | 45,836 | 26.38 | ▼12.67 |
| BJP | Dilip Venkatrao Kandkurte | 42,629 | 24.54 | New |
| AIMIM | Syed Moin Mukhtar | 34,590 | 19.91 | New |
| INC | Omprakash Ganeshlal Pokarna | 31,762 | 18.28 | ▼33.42 |
| BSP | Anwar Javeed Mohammad Kausar | 4,431 | 2.55 | ▼4.23 |
| MNS | Prakash Ramrao Marawar | 1,812 | 1.04 | New |
| BBM | Sham Baburao Nilangekar | 1,776 | 1.02 | New |
| NOTA | None of the Above | 495 | 0.28 | New |
| Margin of victory | | 3,207 | 1.85 | ▼10.80 |
| Turnout | | 174,379 | 57.93 | ▲5.02 |
| Total valid votes | | 173,734 | | |
| Registered electors | | 301,001 | | ▲14.91 |
| SS gain from INC | | Swing | ▼25.32 | |

=== Assembly Election 2009 ===
2009 Maharashtra Legislative Assembly election : Nanded South
| Party | Candidate | Votes | % | ±% |
|---|---|---|---|---|
| INC | Omprakash Ganeshlal Pokarna | 71,367 | 51.70 | New |
| SS | Hemant Patil | 53,904 | 39.05 | New |
| BSP | Yemul Ishwar Lacchiram | 9,354 | 6.78 | New |
| Independent | Balaji Sheshrao Shelke | 1,058 | 0.77 | New |
| Independent | Vijay Chandrao Hanmante (Painter) | 1,026 | 0.74 | New |
| Margin of victory | | 17,463 | 12.65 | |
| Turnout | | 138,054 | 52.70 | |
| Total valid votes | | 138,042 | | |
| Registered electors | | 261,948 | | |
| INC win (new seat) | | | | |
