= Hemant Patil =

Indian politician

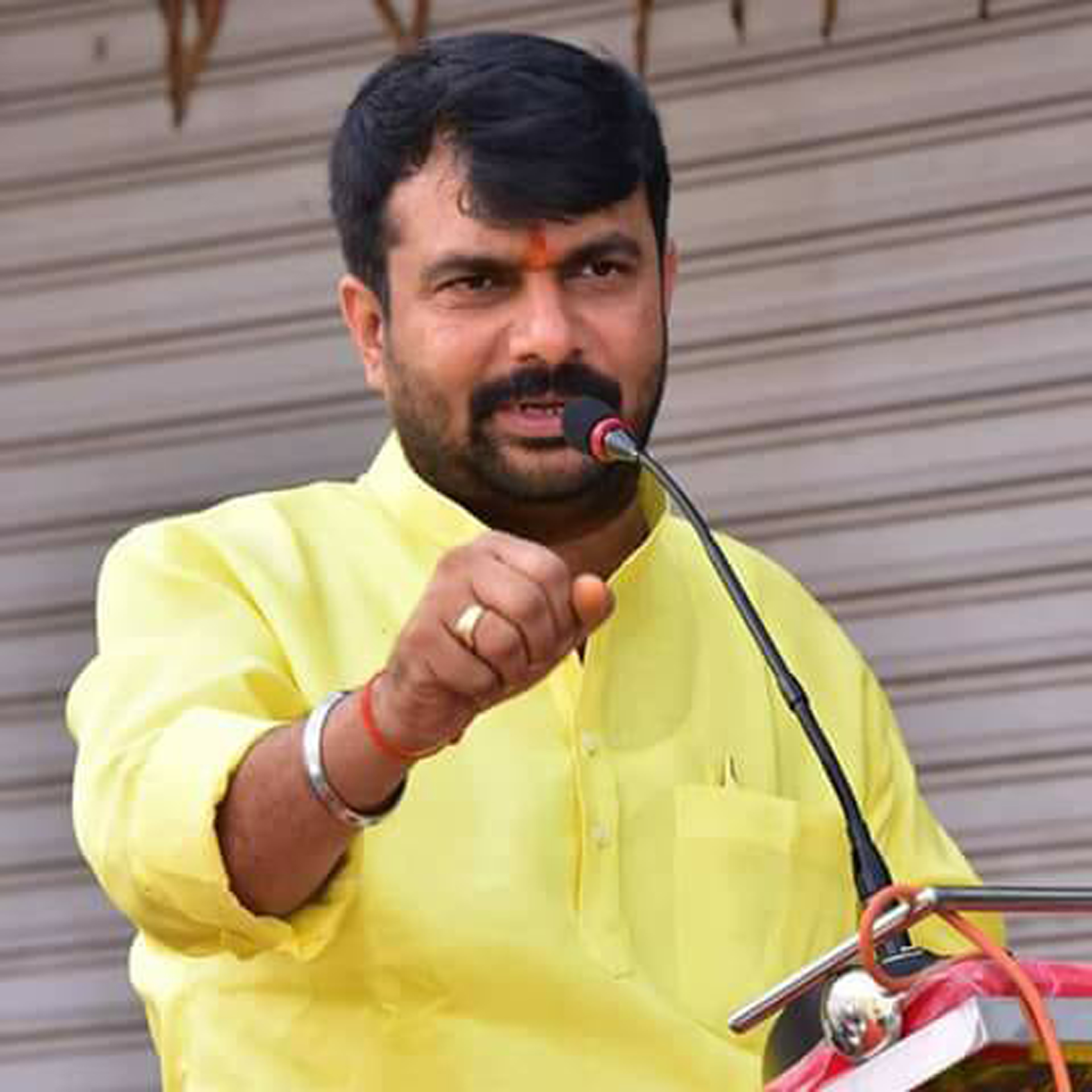

Member of Maharashtra Legislative Council
- Incumbent
- Assumed office 16 October 2024
- Governor: C. P. Radhakrishnan
- Constituency: Nominated

Member of Parliament, Lok Sabha
- In office 23 May 2019 – 4 June 2024
- Preceded by: Rajeev Satav
- Succeeded by: Nagesh Patil
- Constituency: Hingoli

Member of Legislative Assembly of Maharashtra
- In office 2014–2019
- Preceded by: Omprakash Pokarna
- Succeeded by: Mohanrao Marotrao Hambarde
- Constituency: Nanded South

Personal details
- Born: 16 December 1970 (age 55) At.Yehelegaon Tukaram, Tq.Kalamnuri, Dist.Hingoli district
- Party: Shiv Sena (2022–present)
- Other political affiliations: Shiv Sena
- Spouse: Rajashri Hemant Patil
- Children: Rudra
- Occupation: Business & Politician
- Website: hemantpatil.org

Hemant Sriram Patil (born 16 December 1970) is a politician in Shinde's Shiv Sena from Nanded district in Marathwada. He was a member of the 17th Lok Sabha from Hingoli constituency and lost his re-election in 2024 from the Yavatmal–Washim constituency.

Hemant Patil offered his resignation but did not resign from his post as a parliamentarian in support of the Maratha community’s demand of reservation on 29 October 2023.

== Positions held ==
- 2005-2013: Nanded Zilha Pramukh, Shiv Sena
- 2014: Elected to Maharashtra Legislative Assembly
- 2019: Elected to 17th Lok Sabha
- 2024: Elected to Maharashtra Legislative Council
