= Mohanrao Marotrao Hambarde =

Indian politician

Member of Legislative Assembly Maharashtra
- In office November 2019 – 26 November 2024
- Preceded by: Hemant Sriram Patil
- Succeeded by: Anand Tidke
- Constituency: Nanded South

Personal details
- Party: Nationalist Congress Party
- Other political affiliations: Indian National Congress
- Profession: Politician

Mohan Marotrao Hambarde is an Indian politician and a member of the 14th Maharashtra Legislative Assembly. He represents Nanded South (Vidhan Sabha constituency) and he belongs to the Indian National Congress.
