= Nanded-Waghala City Municipal Corporation =

Municipal corporation in Maharashtra, India

Nanded-Waghala City Municipal Corporation (NWCMC)

Type
- Type: Municipal Corporation of the Nanded
- Term limits: 5 years

History
- Founded: 26 March 1997 (29 years ago)
- Preceded by: Nanded Municipal Council

Leadership
- Mayor: Mrs. Kavita Muley, BJP since 10 February 2026
- Municipal Commissioner: Dr. Maheshkumar Doiphode, IAS since May 2020

Structure
- Seats: 81
- Political groups: Government (50): BJP (45); SHS (4); IND (1); Opposition (31): AIMIM (14); INC (10); VBA (5); NCP (2)

Elections
- Voting system: First past the post
- First election: October, 1997
- Last election: 15 January 2026
- Next election: 2031

Motto
- "कटिबद्धा जनहिताय" (Sanskrit); Prepared for public interest

Meeting place
- Town Hall, Oppo. SGGS Memorial Hospital & Near Collectorate, Nanded-431605.

Website
- http://www.nwcmc.gov.in

The Nanded-Waghala City Municipal Corporation is the municipal governing body of the city of Nanded in the Indian state of Maharashtra. Municipal Corporation mechanism in India was introduced during British Rule with formation of municipal corporation in Madras (Chennai) in 1688, later followed by municipal corporations in Bombay (Mumbai) and Calcutta (Kolkata) by 1762. Sitamarhi Municipal Corporation is headed by Mayor of city and governed by Commissioner. The municipal corporation consists of democratically elected members, is headed by a mayor and the Municipal Commissioner is the CEO who administers the city's civic services, infrastructure.

== List of Mayor ==
No.	Name	Party	Term
1	Sudhakar Pandhare	Shivsena	1997-98
2	Mangala Nimkar	INC	1998-99
3	Gangadhar More	INC	1999-2002
4	Omprakash Pokarna	INC	2002-05
5	A.Shamim Begum A.Hafiz	INC	2005-07
6	Balwantsingh Gadiwale	INC	2007-09
7	Prakash Mutha	INC	2009-10
8	Ajay Bisen	INC	2010-12
9	Abdul Sattar	INC	2012-15
10	Shailaja Kishor Swami	INC	2015-17
11	Shila Kishor Bhavre	INC	2017-19
12	Deeksha Dhabale	INC	2019-20
13	Mohini V. Yevankar	INC	2020-22
14	Jayashree Nilesh Pawde	INC	2022-23
17	Administrator	IAS	2022, November- February 2026
18	Kavita Mule	BJP	2026- present

== History ==
NWCMC was established on 26 March 1997, by merging Nanded Municipal Council and adjoining Waghala Municipal Council. The Corporation is constituted under the provisions of Bombay Provincial Municipal Corporations Act, 1949. Corporation is governed by the provisions of 74th Constitutional Amendment Act, 1992.

== Geographical scope ==
Nanded City is divided in two parts i.e. Old Nanded (20.62 km^{2}) situated north side of the Godavari River (on the left bank) and New Nanded (31.14 km^{2}) comprising Waghala and six other newly merged villages and CIDCO area, compromising south of the Godavari River. The total area under the NWCMC jurisdiction is 51.76 km^{2} i.e. (5,176.66 Ha).

In addition to the Waghala Municipal Council 5 more Villages viz. Vasarni Village, Kautha Village, Asarjan Village, Fatehjangpur Village, Asadwan Village & CIDCO and HUDCO colonies were merged with the NWCMC.

== Revenue sources ==
The following are the Income sources for the Corporation from the Central and State Government.

=== Revenue from taxes ===
Following is the Tax related revenue for the corporation.

- Property tax.
- Profession tax.
- Entertainment tax.
- Grants from Central and State Government like Goods and Services Tax.
- Advertisement tax.

=== Revenue from non-tax sources ===
Following is the Non Tax related revenue for the corporation.

- Water usage charges.
- Fees from Documentation services.
- Rent received from municipal property.
- Funds from municipal bonds.

== Administration ==
The NWCMC is headed by an IAS officer who serves as Municipal Commissioner, wielding executive power. A quinquennial election is held to elect corporators, who are responsible for basic civic infrastructure and enforcing duty. The Mayor, usually from the majority party, serves as head of the house.

City officials
Mayor	Kavita Mule	10 February 2026
Deputy Mayor	Deepak Singh Rawat	10 February 2026
Municipal Commissioner	Lahuraj Mali	8 May 2020
Police Commissioner	Manoj Singhal	28 February 2019

== Commissioner's of Nanded ==
Office of NWCMC is located at Nanded which is situated on the banks of Godavari River.

- Sumant Bhange
- Shravan Hardikar, IAS
- Shushil Khodwekar
- Lahuraj Mali
- Dr. Sunil Lahane
- Current Commissioner is Dr.Maheshkumar Doiphode
