= Dr. Shankarrao Chavan Government Medical College =

Government Medical College in Maharashtra

- Marathi: डॉ. शंकरराव चव्हाण शासकीय वैद्यकीय महाविद्यालय व रुग्णालय
- Former names: Government Medical College, Nanded
- Motto: Service for Humanity
- Type: Education and Research Institution
- Established: 1988; 38 years ago
- Affiliations: Maharashtra University of Health Sciences, NMC
- Endowment: Government Funded
- Dean: Dr. Sudhir Deshmukh
- Academic staff: 28
- Students: 500 Total
- Location: Nanded, Maharashtra, India
- Campus: 115 acres (47 ha)
- Website: www.drscgmcnanded.in

Dr. Shankarrao Chavan Government Medical College (SCGMC) is a public medical college situated in Nanded, Maharashtra. It was established in 1988 due to efforts of former Chief Minister of Maharashtra Shankarrao Chavan, and today it is named after him. The college was transferred to the Vishnupuri area of the city in 2015 and is located on the Nanded-Latur State Highway.

== Facilities ==
It has a 600 bedded hospital with an excellent facility of modern equipment. It also has 32 Operation Theatres in the OT Complex consisting of modern laminar OT's and centralized Air-conditioning. It has huge inflow of patients from Nanded city and District as well as neighboring districts of Parbhani, Hingoli and Yavatmal as well as the border districts of Telangana state. Due to large patient load and limited resources, rush and cleanliness and patient care are big problems. But still it's only resort for poor and deprived from society.

== History of Institute ==
Initially, started in 1988, in the Vazirabad area of Nanded attached to the Guru Gobind Singhji Memorial civil hospital the hospital has grown into a much bigger hospital in an area of 115 acres campus after its shift to the vishnupuri area in the outskirts of the city offering a huge scope for expansion in future. It also has AC classrooms and a well equipped library with air-conditioners having a huge availability of over 17000 books to the students.

== Admissions ==
=== Undergraduate ===
Every year 150 students are admitted for the course of MBBS.

=== Postgraduate ===
- MD Medicine
- MD Pediatrics
- MD Pulmonary Medicine
- MD Pharmacology
- MD microbiology
- MD Pathology
- MD Physiology
- MD Anatomy
- MD Biochemistry
- MS Orthopedics
- MS General Surgery
- MS Ophthalmology

== Academics ==
Courses available in SCGMC

- MBBS
- MD/MS
- CPS Diploma

== Achievements ==
Former Dean of the university, Dr. Dilip Mhaisekar was appointed as the new Vice-Chancellor of Maharashtra University of Health Sciences, Nashik.
