= Shri Guru Gobind Singhji Institute of Engineering and Technology =

College in Maharashtra, India

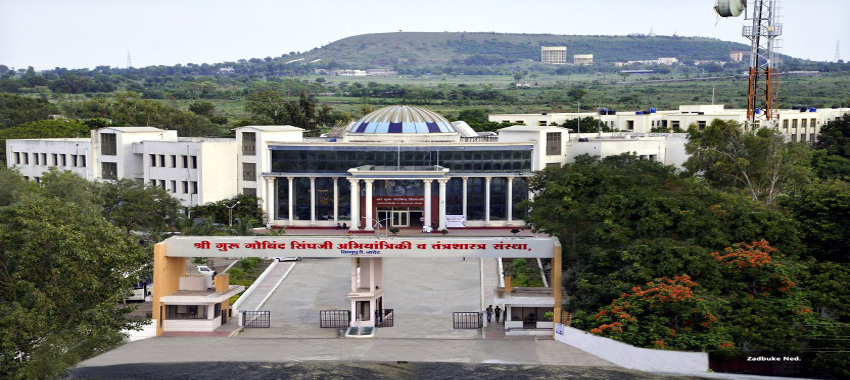
- Former name: SGGS College of Engineering
- Type: Govt-aided Autonomous
- Established: 1981; 45 years ago
- Affiliations: SRTMU Nanded
- Chairman: Sunil Raithatta
- Director: Manesh Kokare
- Undergraduates: ~700
- Location: Vishnupuri, Nanded, Maharashtra, India
- Campus: Urban, 18.62 hectare (46 acres)
- Website: www.sggs.ac.in

Shri Guru Gobind Singhji Institute of Engineering and Technology (SGGSIE&T) is an institute of Engineering and technology in Nanded, Maharashtra, India. The institute was accorded full autonomous status in June 2004 It offers training in ten undergraduate and ten postgraduate programs in various fields of technical education, research and technology transfer. It also offers a PhD programs under its affiliating university, Swami Ramanand Teerth Marathwada University and under Quality Improvement Programme of Ministry of Education, Government of India, New Delhi. Accredited by NAAC with B++ grade 2.91 CGPA. Three programs accredited by NBA, namely Electronics and Telecommunication, Instrumentation and Production Engineering. Rank NIRF in 89 (2016), ARIIA 4th (2020). Students have won First prize 2020, runner up (2019) in SAE BAJA.

The college is located at a campus of over 46 acres (19 ha). The land for the institute was donated by the Sant Baba Harnam Singh Langer Sahib Gurudwara trust, Nanded. The Institute is named after the 10th Sikh guru, Guru Gobind Singh.

== History ==
The project was approved by the AICTE on 17 December 1981. The institute was registered under the Society's Act of 1960, and was fully funded by the Government of Maharashtra.

The Sant Shri Baba Harnamji trust donated a 46 acres land for the institute. Hence the institute was named after the 10th Sikh Guru, Shri Guru Gobind Singhji. The Governing Board, with the Director of Technical Education at its helm, overlooked the completion of the project. In 1983 Prof. B.M. Naik was appointed as the first full-time director.

In 2004, a committee headed by Dr. F. C. Kholi conducted a survey which identified three engineering colleges with potential for excellence. SGGSIE&T was one of the three selected institutes. The Government of Maharashtra took the initiative of granting autonomous status to these engineering colleges under its TEQIP program.

Sunil Raithatha, an eminent industrialist, was nominated by the Government of Maharashtra as Chairman of the Governing Board. The Government has also appointed renowned personalities form business and industry, academics and its senior administrative cadre on the Governing Board.

== Governance ==
The Institute has autonomy in academic, financial and administrative matters. Prof. Dr. Manesh B. Kokare became the director of the institute in 2023.

In the Eligibility Criterion of NPIU, Institute secured 59 Marks out of 63 and is selected under TEQIP for assistance.

== Notable alumni ==
- Dr. Uddhav V. Bhosle (Vice-Chancellor of SRTMUN)
- Dr. S.G. Bhirud, I/C Director VJTI
- Mr. Amol Mahamuni (Programme Director, IBM)
- Dr Prashant Zade (Chairman of A S Agri and Aqua LLP)
- Dr. Rajendra Deshpande (CIO of Intelenet Global Services)
- Mr. Samir Karande (Chief Cloud Architect at Teradata, Global leader at AWS)
- Mr. Abhay Deshpande, Recykal, Hyderabad
- Prof. Y. V. Joshi, Ex Director, SGGSIE&T Nanded (2018–23) and Walchand College of Engineering, Sangli (2009-2013)
- Mr. Ajinkya Dharia, PADCARE and many more

=== Govt.Sector ===
1. Mr. Eknath Dawale (IAS),
2. Mr. Ashutosh Dumbre(IPS),
3. Mr. Khushal Pardeshi (IAS),
4. Mr. Madhav Sulphule (IFS),
5. Mr. Sanjay Lathkar (IPS)- Ex. DGP ACB Maharashtra
6. Mrs. Usha Rahul Sarpate, AE (Civil), MES

== Academics ==
=== Accreditation ===
The institute is an autonomous institute and is accredited by the All India Council for Technical Education. In 2011 it had a first year intake capacity of 610 + 31(TFWS)+61(EWS) for its under-graduate courses which included seats under AICTE's tuition fee waiver scheme.

=== Academic programmes ===
The institute offers both undergraduate and postgraduate programs. The undergraduate coursework is offered in 10 disciplines with an intake capacity of 610. Master's degree programs are offered in 10 speciality fields with an intake capacity of ~200.

Institute is recognized as a research center by the Swami Ramanand Teerth Marathwada University, Nanded for doctoral programs. QIP centre for research (Ph.D.) since 2011-12: The seats sanctioned under QIP are 10. Two seats for each disciplines namely Civil Engineering, Electronics and Telecommunication Engineering, Instrumentation and Control, Mechanical Engineering, Production Engineering.

A Center of Excellence in signal and image processing was established in September 2013 and formally inaugurated on 19 September 2015.

=== Student Life ===
1. RNXG - A robotic club of the institute
2. PHONIX - A automation club
3. AVAROH - A music club
4. CHITRAKSH - A media club (covers all the events of institute)
5. FSDC - Dance club
6. Each Department has its club and many more there are nearly 20 clubs

== See also ==
- College of Engineering, Pune
- Government College of Engineering, Aurangabad
- Government College of Engineering, Chandrapur
- Government College of Engineering, Amravati
- Veermata Jijabai Technological Institute, Mumbai
