= Manikbhandar =

- Locality
- Country: India
- State: Telangana
- City: Nizamabad

Population
  - Total: 6,124

Languages
  - Official: Telugu
- Time zone: UTC+5:30 (IST)
- PIN: 503003
- Vehicle registration: TS 16

Manikbhandar is a locality in Nizamabad city of Telangana state, India. It used to be a village in the Nizamabad district before the extension of Municipal Corporation limits and now it comes under the jurisdiction of Nizamabad Municipal Corporation. However the locality is administrated by Sarpanch who is elected representative of village.

== Nearby Places ==
1. Vijay Rural Engineering College
2. Kakatiya Institute of Technology for Women (KITW) are located at Manikbhandar.
