= Loha, Nanded district =

Loha, India
- Town
- Location in Maharashtra, India
- Coordinates: 18.9623°N 77.1309°E
- Country: India
- State: Maharashtra
- District: Nanded

Population (2011)
  - Total: 24,125

Languages
  - Official: Marathi
- Time zone: UTC+5:30 (IST)
- PIN: 43170 8
- Area code: 02466
- Vehicle registration: MH 26

Loha is a town with municipal council in Nanded district in the Indian state of Maharashtra. Malegaon Yatra, is held every year in honour of Lord Khandoba in Malegoan, a village situated in Loha Taluka that is located 35 km from Nanded. Being on national highway 361 and 361F this is very well connected for the transportation for Mumbai, Goa-Raypur and Hyderabad.

== Demographics ==
As of 2011 India census, Loha had a population of 24,125. Males constitute 12,334 of the population and females 11,791.

Literacy rate of Loha city is 78.64% lower than Maharashtra state average of 82.34%. In Loha, Male literacy is around 86.94% while female literacy rate is 69.96%.

In Loha, 13.5% of the population is under 6 years of age. In Loha Municipal Council, Female Sex Ratio is of 956 higher than state average of 929.

Loha has Tehsil and it is a Taluka separated from Kandhar. It is 448 km far from its State Main City Mumbai. There are around 62 sub villages in loha.

Schedule Caste (SC) constitutes 16.07% while Schedule Tribe (ST) were 0.18% of total population in Loha.

== Hospitals ==
There is a Government Hospital and several private hospitals in the town. Dr. Bharati's Moraya Hospital, Accident Orthopedics and diabetes care center.k Dr.Milind Dhansade's Medicare Hospital and care center(Near vyanktesh Mangal karyalay, Loha) and Venkatesh hospital at shivkalyan nagar Dr bhosikar madam.

=== Schools / Colleges ===
- Global English School & Junior College, Mote Patil Nagar, Loha
- Janta High School, Dagad Sangvi
- Shri Sant Gadge Maharaj College, Loha
- Shri Sant Gadge Maharaj Highschool, Loha
- Rajarshi Shahu Maharaj Jr College, Loha
- k.v.NALGE High school loha
- Shiv chhatrapati secondary and higher secondary school loha
- Shri Sharad Pawar High School, Chitali
- ShivNiketan secondary and higher secondary Vidhyalaya, Sawargaon (N.)
