= Government College of Engineering, Chandrapur =

College in Maharashtra, India

- Other names: GEC, Chandrapur
- Motto: Knowledge for Nation
- Type: Government
- Established: 1996
- Parent institution: Government of Maharashtra
- Academic affiliations: Gondwana University
- Principal: Dr. Prashant Washimkar
- Undergraduates: 340+ per Annum
- Postgraduates: 160 per Annum
- Location: Ballarshah Bypass Road, Babupeth, Chandrapur, Maharashtra, 442403, India
- Campus: 63 acres (0.25 km^{2})
- Language: मराठी
- Website: www.gcoec.ac.in

The Government College of Engineering, Chandrapur (GCOEC) was established in 1996 in Chandrapur, Maharashtra, India. It is affiliated to Gondwana University. It is the only government institute under Gondwana University, Gadchiroli. It is completely funded by Government of Maharashtra. GCOEC is situated in the city of a super thermal power plant and at the center of the region with abundant coal. The region contributes in fulfilling the demand of energy resource as well as power of the country while, GCOEC promises to fulfill quality technical human resource needed for these sectors in India. The college is accredited by Directorate of Technical Education (DTE), Maharashtra and All India Council of Technical Education (AICTE).

== Campus ==
The college campus covers an area of 63 acres (0.25 km^{2}). The campus has a centralized library, a gymkhana.

== Organisation and administration ==
=== Departments ===
The college offers degrees in the following six disciplines of engineering:

- Instrumentation Engineering
- Electrical Power Engineering
- Mechanical Engineering
- Computer Science Engineering
- Civil Engineering
- Electronics and Telecommunication Engineering
- Applied Mechanics Department
- Mathematics Department
- Physics Department
- Chemistry Department
- Humanities Department

=== PG Section ===
College started post graduation, i.e. Master's degree programs, from academic year 2020 in the following disciplines:

- M.Tech. (Mechanical Engg.)
- M.Tech. (Electrical Power System)

== Academics ==
=== Admissions ===
Admission criteria are based on the MHT-CET / JEE-Main rankings.

== See also ==
- Government Medical College, Chandrapur
