= Swami Ramanand Teerth Marathwada University =

University in Maharashtra, India

Swami Ramanand Teerth Marathwada University, Nanded
- स्वामी रामानंद तीर्थ मराठवाडा विद्यापीठ, नांदेड
- Former name: Marathwada University Sub Centre (before Namantar movement)
- Motto: Sa Vidyaya Vimuktaye
- Motto in English: (education which liberates)
- Type: Public
- Established: 17 September 1994 (32 years ago)
- Academic affiliations: UGC, AIU, NAAC, ACU
- Endowment: ₹600 million
- Budget: ₹600 million
- Chancellor: Governor of Maharashtra
- Vice-Chancellor: Dr. Manohar Chaskar
- Academic staff: 2,000
- Students: 24,247 (2019)
- Undergraduates: 13,354 (2019)
- Postgraduates: 10,893 (2019)
- Location: Latur-Nanded Hwy, Vishnupuri, Nanded, Maharashtra, India
- Campus: Latur
- Website: www.srtmun.ac.in

Swami Ramanand Teerth Marathwada University (SRTMU) was established in 1994 as a state public university of Maharashtra state. Named after Swami Ramanand Teerth, it is located at Latur Road Nanded in Maharashtra, India.

== History ==
The university is intended to serve primarily the southern part of Marathwada, specifically the districts of Nanded, Latur, Parbhani, and Hingoli. The main university campus, which is about 20 km (12 mi) south of Nanded township, occupies approximately 595 acres (241 ha) and there is a 22-acre (8.9 ha) sub-campus at Peth, Latur.

The university has received recognition from the UGC and the NAAC.

The university has directors for sports and physical education, and students welfare. There is a National Service Scheme (NSS) programme officer.

The university has Distance Education Department having PG Programme in Marathi, Hindi, English, Urdu, History, Political Sciences, Sociology, Economics and Public Administration at 59 affiliated Study centers at Nanded, Hingoli, Latur and Parbhani.

The university offers 27 postgraduate courses in Arts, Sciences, Computer, Commerce, Education, Business Administration, bachelor and master of Pharmacy. The un

1. Nanded
2. Parbhani

The main campus at Nanded has the following schools:

- School of Pharmacy
- School of Commerce & Management Sciences
- School of Computational Sciences
- School of Social Sciences
- School of Educational Sciences
- School of Fine & Performing Arts
- School of Media Studies
- School of Language, Literature & Culture Studies
- School of Mathematical Sciences
- School of Earth Sciences
- School of Chemical Sciences
- School of Physical Sciences
- School of Life Sciences
- School of Interdisciplinary Studies
- School of Library & Information Sciences

Sub-campus at Latur has the following schools:

- Sub-Campus Latur School of Technology
- Sub-Campus Latur School of Management
- Sub-Campus Latur School of Social Sciences
- Sub-Campus Latur School of Languages

University also has another Sub-Campus at Parbhani, a Tribal Development & Research Center at Kinwat, Dist: Nanded & a constituent college at Hingoli named New Model Degree College, Hingoli

== See also ==
- Swami Ramanand Tirth
