= Nanded =

City in Maharashtra, India

Nanded Nandigram
- City
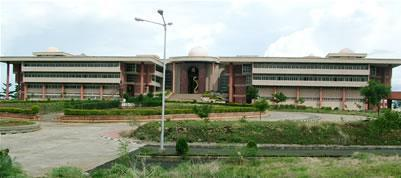
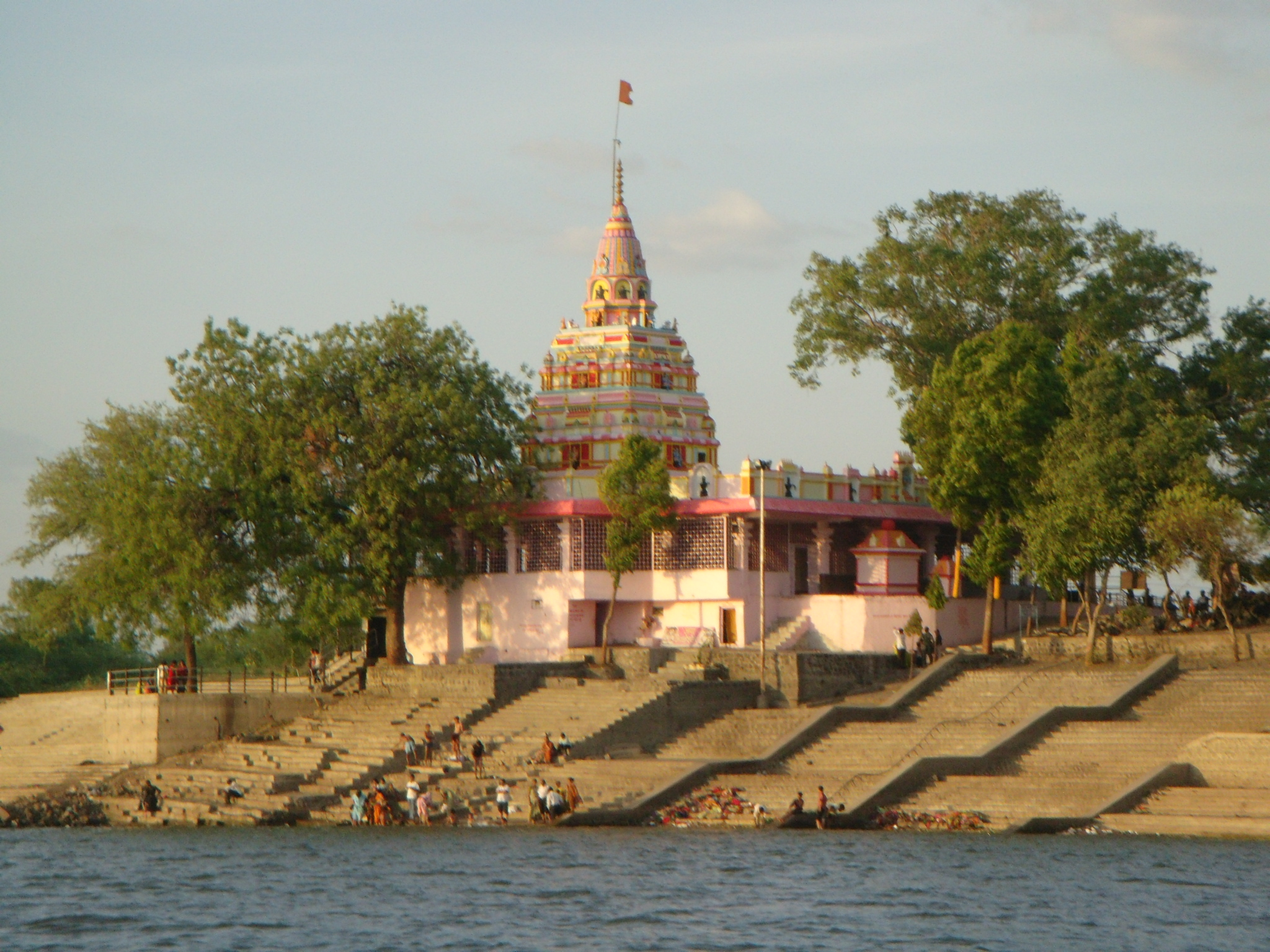
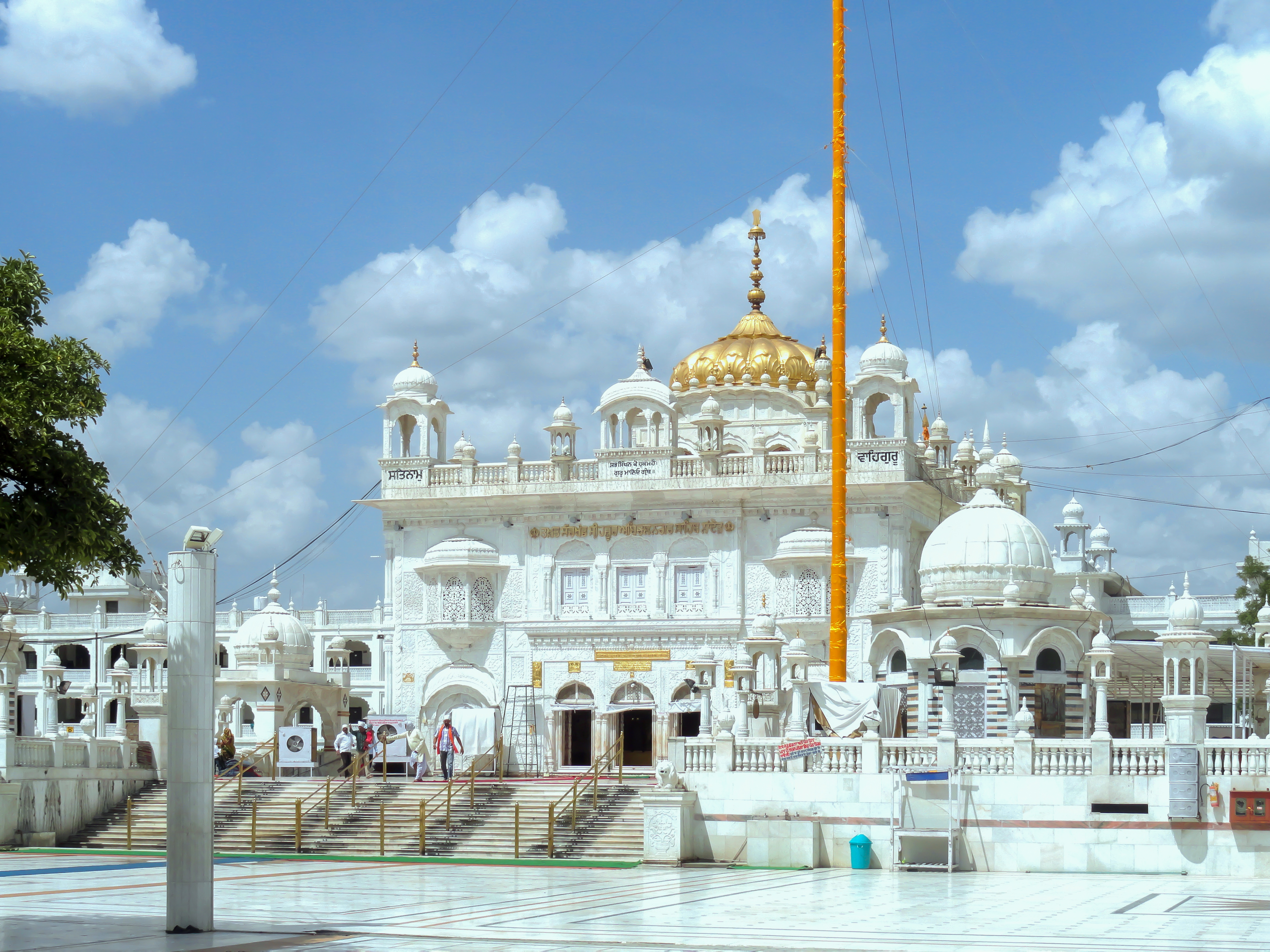
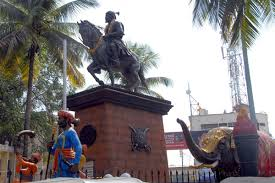
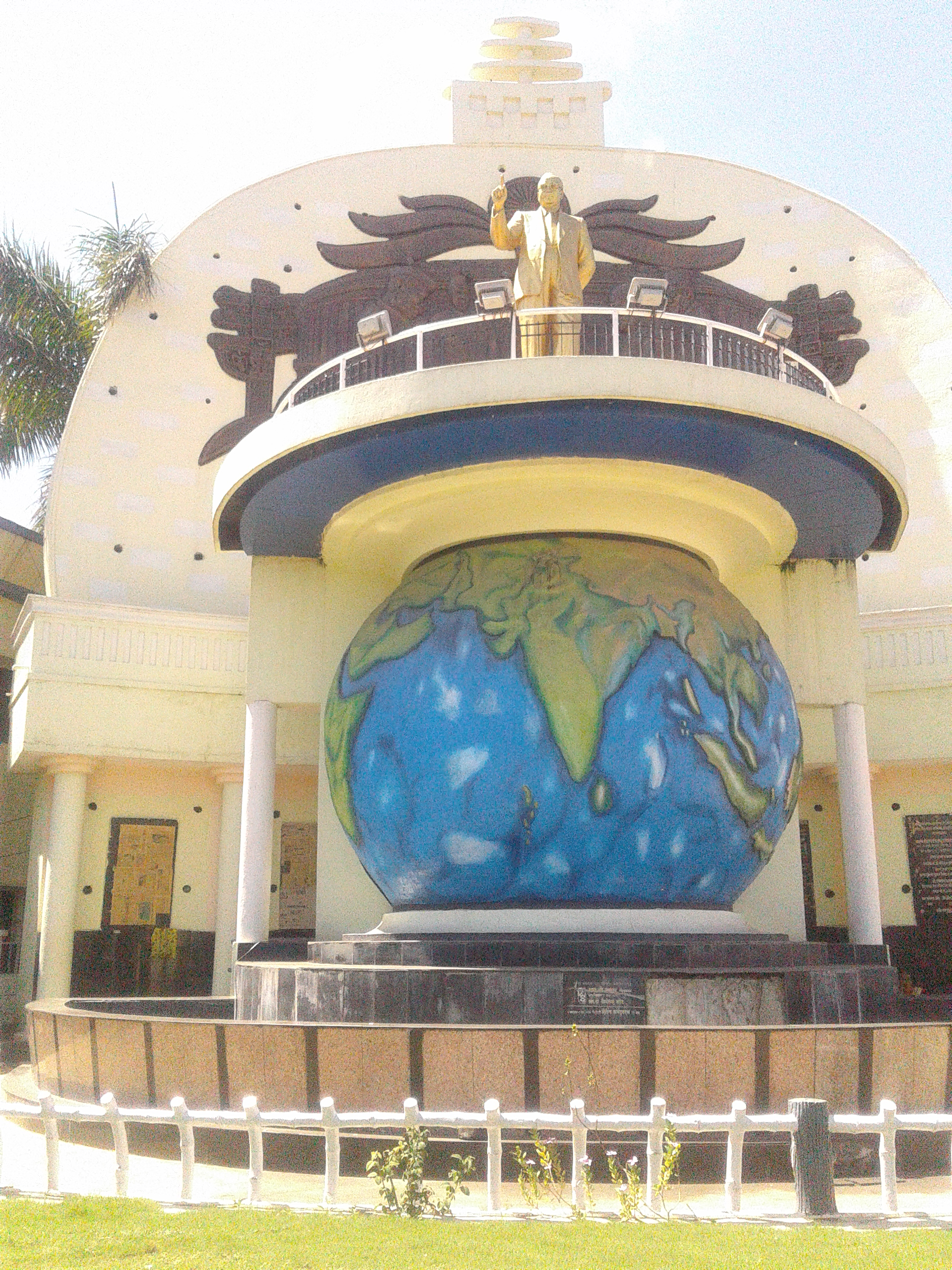
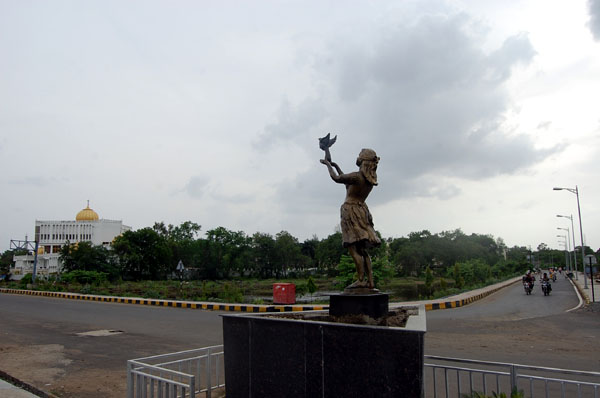
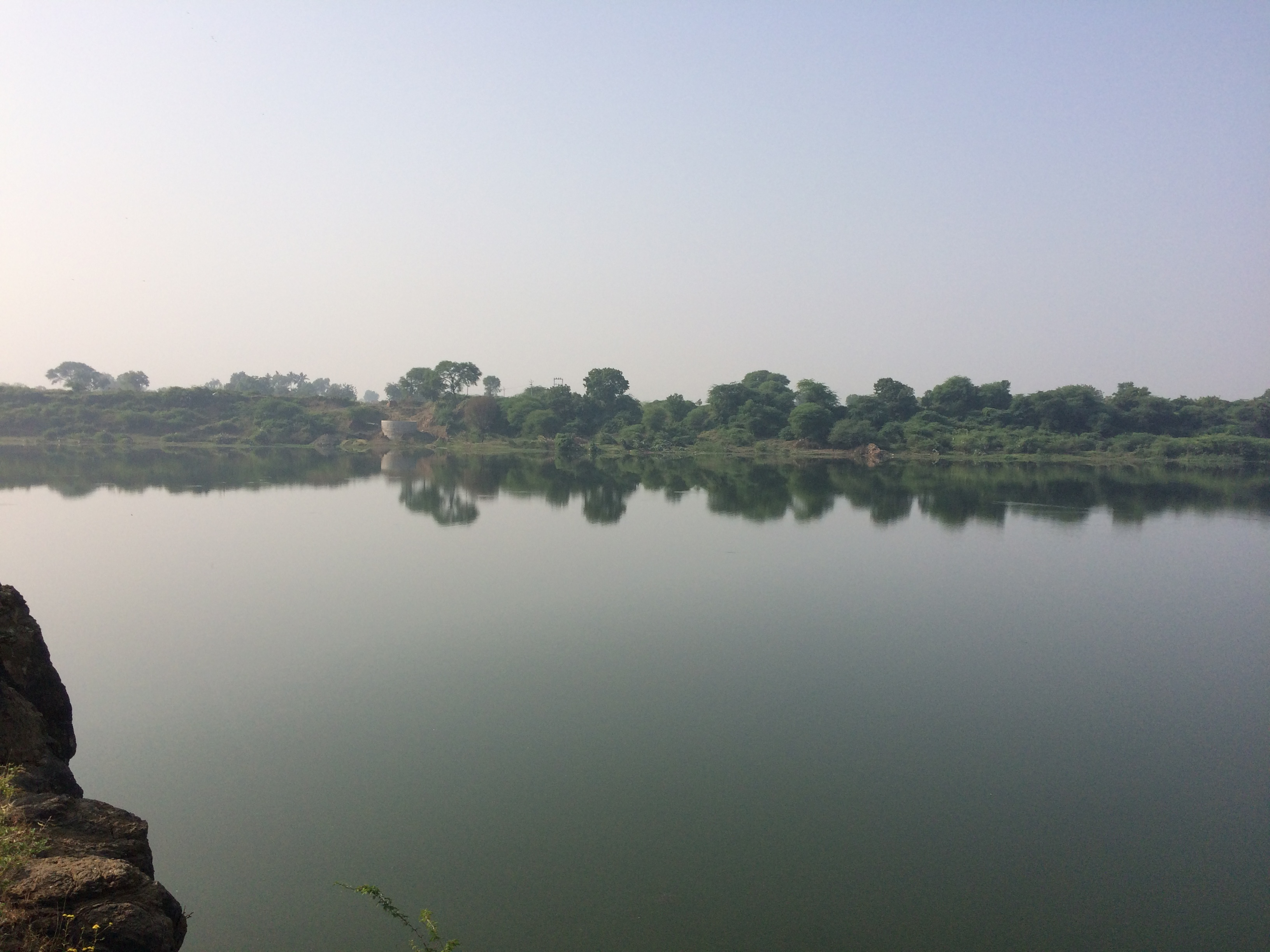
- From top, left to right: Swami Ramanand Teerth Marathwada University, Kaleshwar Mandir, Hazur Sahib, Chatrapati Shivaji Maharaj statue, Ambedkar statue, Freedom statue and Godavari River
- Nicknames: Nanditaṭa, Nandigrāma, City of Poets, City of Gurdwaras
- Location within Maharashtra Location within India
- Coordinates: 19.15°N 77.30°E
- Country: India
- State: Maharashtra
- Region: Marathwada
- District: Nanded district
- Founder: Nanda Dynasty
- Named for: Gurudwara

Government
  - Type: Municipal Corporation
  - Body: Nanded-Waghala Municipal Corporation
  - Mayor: Kavita Mule (BJP)
  - MLAs: Anand Shankar Tidke – Nanded South; Balaji Kalyankar – Nanded North

Area
  - Total: 63.22 km^{2} (24.41 sq mi)
- Elevation: 362 m (1,188 ft)

Population (2011)
  - Total: 550,439
  - Rank: 2nd (Marathwada); 79th (India)
  - Density: 8,707/km^{2} (22,550/sq mi)
- Demonym: Nandedkar

Language
  - Official: Marathi
- Time zone: UTC+5:30 (IST)
- PIN CODE: 431601 to 606
- Telephone code: 02462
- ISO 3166 code: IN-MH
- Vehicle registration: MH-26
- Gross domestic product: IN₹ 21,257.00 crores (2013)
- Website: nanded.gov.in

Nanded is a city in Maharashtra state, India. It is the tenth largest city in the state and the seventy-ninth most populated city in India. It is the second largest city in Marathwada region. It is the district headquarters of Nanded district.

Guru Gobind Singh established camp in Nanded and the Gurgaddi was transferred from him to Guru Granth Sahib. One of the Panj Takhts of Sikhi, Hazur Sahib is located in the city of Nanded. It was here that Guru Gobind Singh initiated Madho Das whom became Banda Singh Bahadur one of the famous leaders of the Khalsa Panth whom played a role during the downfall of the Mughal Empire.

== Location ==
Nanded is located on the banks of river Godavari in west-central India. Nanded district borders Latur district, Parbhani district and Hingoli district to the west and Yavatmal district to the north. The district is bordered by the Nizamabad, Kamareddy, Nirmal and Adilabad districts of Telangana state to the east and Bidar district of Karnataka state to the south.

Nanded has two parts: Old Nanded 20.62 square kilometres (7.96 sq mi) occupies the north bank of the Godavari river; New Nanded, to the south of the river, 31.14 square kilometres (12.02 sq mi) encompasses Waghala and neighbourhoods.

== Etymology ==
From a copper plate inscription found at Washim, a town approximately 150 kilometres (93 mi) north of Nanded, archaeologists deduce the city was formerly known as Nanditaṭa (Marathi: नंदितट). Another name was Nandigrāma. Folklore suggests that the name "Nanded" developed from Nandi the Vahana of Shiva. Shiva was said to have performed penance on the banks (Taṭa) of the Godavari river. This "Nandi-taṭa" later became "Nanded".

== History ==
In the 1st century CE, power in the area lay with the Andhrabhrtyas and Satvahanas. In the 5th and 4th centuries BCE, Nanded was ruled by the Nanda dynasty. In the 3rd century BCE (about 272 to 231 BCE), it was part of the Maurya Empire under Ashoka. Local irrigation practices and Nanded itself are recorded in the treatise, Leela Charitra (late 1200s CE). Nanded was the birthplace of three Marathi poet-saints—Vishnupant Shesa, Raghunath Shesa, and Vaman Pandit Construction of Kandhar Fort, located in Kandhar, is attributed to the Rashtrakuta king Krishna III of Malkheda who ruled around the 10th century CE.

From 1636, Nanded was the centre of governance of Nizam State, which included parts of present-day Telangana and Karnataka, and was an imperial province of the Mughal Badshah (emperor) Shah Jahan. In 1657, Nanded merged into Bidah Subah. Guru Nanak (1469 – 1539 CE) passed through Nanded on his way to Sri Lanka. Guru Gobind Singh (1666 – 1708 CE) arrived in Nanded with the Mughal emperor Bahadur Shah I (1643 – 1712 CE) near the end of August in 1707 CE. When Bahadur Shah moved on to Hyderabad, Guru Gobind Singh remained in Nanded. Guru Gobind Singh proclaimed he was the last (tenth) living guru and established the sacred text, the Guru Granth Sahib as an eternal "living" leader. Guru Gobind Singh died without a lineal descendant due to the martyrdom of his four sons.

In 1725, Nanded became part of Hyderabad State. In about 1835, Maharaja Ranjit Singh commissioned the construction of a gurdwara at Nanded with the financial aid of Sikander Jah (3rd Nizam of hyderabad) It was built on the site of Guru Gobind Singh's cremation. The gurdwara is part of the Hazur Sahib.

After India gained independence in 1947, the Indian Armed Forces annexed Hyderabad and ended the rule of the Nizam in Operation Polo, making Nanded part of the new Hyderabad State. Nanded remained part of the Hyderabad state until 1956 when it was included in the Bombay Presidency.

On 1 May 1960, Maharashtra state was created on a linguistic basis and the Marathi dominant Nanded district became part of Maharashtra. In December 2022, 25 Nanded district villages renewed their demand to merge with Telangana.

== Geography ==
Nanded is situated in the Marathwada region of southeastern Maharashtra, on the banks of the Godavari River. The river is the city's principal geographical feature and has historically influenced its urban development and cultural significance. The city lies within the Deccan Plateau and is characterized by generally level to gently undulating terrain.

Nanded urban area is 63.22 square kilometres (24.41 sq mi). Nanded is built on the Deccan Traps lava flows of the upper cretaceous to lower eocene eras. The lava flows are overlain by thin alluvial deposits. The lava flows are horizontal and each flow has two distinct units. The highly weathered vesicular trap and underlying weathered jointed and fractured massive trap constitutes the main water-yielding zones. The soil is mostly formed from igneous rocks and are black, medium black, shallow and calcareous types having different depths and profiles. Godavari River passes through the city.

== Climate ==
Nanded has a tropical savanna climate (Köppen climate classification Aw) bordering a hot semi-arid climate (BSh).

Climate data for Nanded (1991–2020, extremes 1960–2020)
Month	Jan	Feb	Mar	Apr	May	Jun	Jul	Aug	Sep	Oct	Nov	Dec	Year
Record high °C (°F)	36.6 (97.9)	40.0 (104.0)	43.0 (109.4)	46.0 (114.8)	46.6 (115.9)	46.7 (116.1)	40.3 (104.5)	39.0 (102.2)	38.2 (100.8)	38.8 (101.8)	38.8 (101.8)	36.0 (96.8)	46.7 (116.1)
Mean daily maximum °C (°F)	31.0 (87.8)	33.4 (92.1)	37.1 (98.8)	40.6 (105.1)	40.7 (105.3)	36.6 (97.9)	32.1 (89.8)	30.8 (87.4)	32.1 (89.8)	33.4 (92.1)	32.0 (89.6)	30.5 (86.9)	34.0 (93.2)
Mean daily minimum °C (°F)	13.8 (56.8)	15.2 (59.4)	19.0 (66.2)	23.6 (74.5)	25.7 (78.3)	24.7 (76.5)	23.2 (73.8)	22.7 (72.9)	22.4 (72.3)	20.1 (68.2)	16.5 (61.7)	13.1 (55.6)	20.3 (68.5)
Record low °C (°F)	4.9 (40.8)	6.4 (43.5)	10.4 (50.7)	13.4 (56.1)	17.0 (62.6)	17.4 (63.3)	15.2 (59.4)	12.0 (53.6)	14.2 (57.6)	11.2 (52.2)	5.0 (41.0)	3.6 (38.5)	3.6 (38.5)
Average rainfall mm (inches)	3.3 (0.13)	7.7 (0.30)	5.9 (0.23)	4.3 (0.17)	10.5 (0.41)	154.2 (6.07)	217.5 (8.56)	214.2 (8.43)	138.5 (5.45)	57.7 (2.27)	8.1 (0.32)	1.7 (0.07)	823.5 (32.42)
Average rainy days	0.4	0.7	0.5	0.6	0.9	7.5	10.8	11.2	7.4	3.0	0.7	0.4	44.0
Average relative humidity (%) (at 17:30 IST)	37	31	30	23	27	49	64	68	60	48	39	38	44
Source: India Meteorological Department

== Governance ==
The Nanded Waghala City Municipal Corporation was constituted on 26 March 1997 through the merger of the Nanded Municipal Council and the adjoining Waghala Municipal Council. Established under the provisions of the Bombay Provincial Municipal Corporations Act, 1949, the corporation serves as the urban local government responsible for the administration and development of the merged city.

The Corporation covers a total jurisdictional area of 51.76 km² and is administratively divided into six zones and 20 wards, each represented by an elected councillor.

The administration is headed by Municipal Commissioner Dr. Maheshkumar Doiphode, who oversees the implementation of municipal policies and day-to-day operations. The political leadership comprises Mayor Kavita Santosh Mule and Deputy Mayor Deepak Singh Rawat, who assumed office following their election in February 2026.

The Nanded Waghala City Municipal Corporation administers civic services through several departments, including the General Administration, Accounts and Finance, Tax, Engineering, Water Supply and Drainage, Town Planning, Solid Waste Management, Fire Fighting, Gardens and Tree Plantation, Law and Justice, Information Technology, Information and Public Relations, Education, Sports and Cultural Affairs, Health, Veterinary, Disaster Management, and Encroachment Control and Removal departments. These departments are responsible for municipal administration, urban planning, public health, infrastructure development, sanitation, revenue collection, environmental management, emergency services, and the delivery of civic services across the city.

== Demographics ==
Religion in Nanded (2011)
Religion	Percent
Hinduism	48.05%
Islam	33.59%
Buddhism	15.35%
Sikhism	2.00%
Jainism	0.53%
Other or not stated	0.48%

As of the 2011 census, Nanded had a population of 550,564. The municipality had a gender ratio of 924 females per 1,000 males. 12.4 percent of the population were under six years old. Effective literacy was 87.40 percent. 81.74 percent of women were literate. Male literacy was 92.68 percent.

Hinduism is the largest religion, practiced by nearly half the population. A third of the population practices Islam and 15% are Buddhist. 2% are Sikh, one of the few Deccani towns where Sikhism is a relatively large religion.

Language in Nanded (2011)
1. Marathi (55.5%)
2. Urdu (29.2%)
3. Hindi (9.33%)
4. Telugu (1.85%)
5. Marwari (1.29%)
6. Others (2.76%)

Marathi is the largest language, spoken by 56% of the population. Urdu is the second-largest language, spoken by 29% of the population and Hindi is spoken by 9% of the population.

== Transport ==
=== Road ===
Nanded lies on NH 61 (Kalyan–Ahmednagar–Parbhani–Nanded–Nirmal), NH 361 (Nagpur–Wardha-Yavatmal–Nanded-Latur–Solapur–Miraj–Kolhapur–Ratnagiri) and NH 161 (Akola–Washim–Hingoli–Nanded–Degloor–Sangareddy). MSRTC buses connect Nanded to many cities of the Maharashtra state. TSRTC buses connect Nanded to some cities of the Telangana state.

=== Rail ===
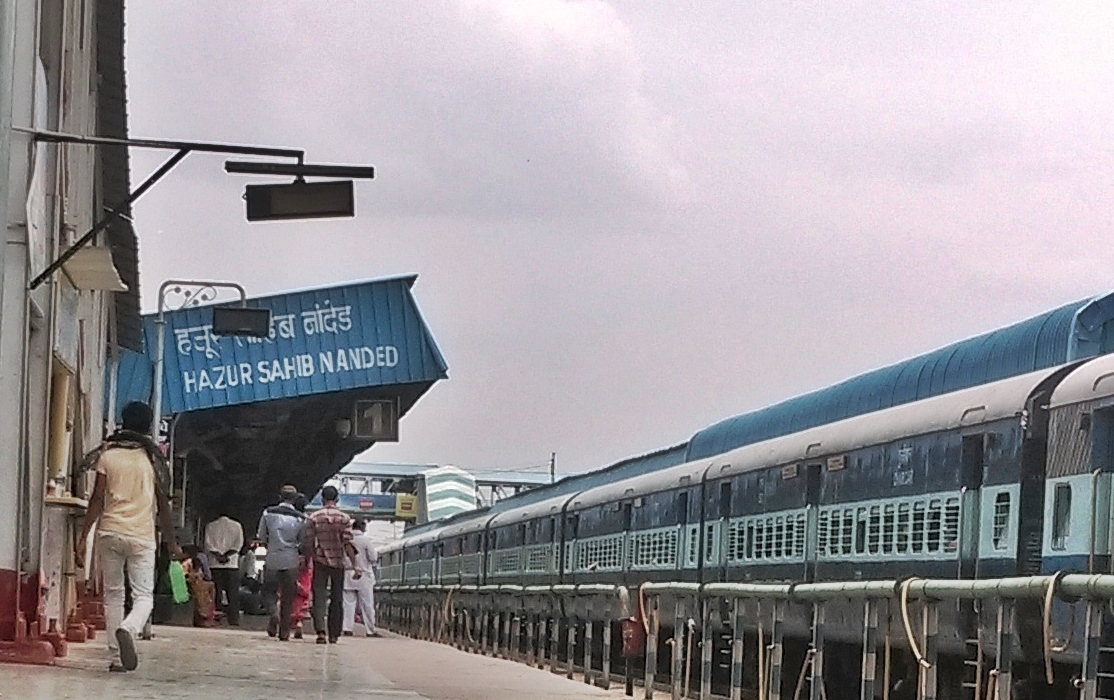
Hazur Sahib Nanded Railway Station

Hazur Sahib Nanded railway station is located on the Secunderabad–Manmad line of Nanded railway division of the South Central Railway Zone (SCR). Nanded railway division is one of the three railway divisions under South Central Railway zone of Indian Railways. Around 48 trains arrive and depart each day from this station. Maltekdi railway station is another railway station serving city of Nanded.

=== Air ===
Shri Guru Gobind Singh Ji Airport operates flights to Delhi (Ghaziabad), Bangalore, Pune, Ahmedabad, Goa and Hyderabad. Star Airways operates the flights.

== Economy ==
Crops grown around Nanded include cotton, bananas, sugarcane, mangoes, soya beans, sweet limes, Grapes, Papaya, and sorghum (jawar). Nanded has a Regional Cotton Research Center to support the Cotton-growing industry. There is an agricultural school operational under the aegis of Krishi Vidyapeeth of Parbhani.

Tourism is supported by 10 million annual visitors who are mostly religious pilgrims.

== Education ==
On 17 September 1994, the Swami Ramanand Teerth Marathwada University (SRTMU) was established in Nanded after a restructuring of the Marathwada University in Aurangabad. The university supervises the educational activities in senior colleges in four districts of Marathwada division.

Notable educational institutions in Nanded include the Dr. Shankarrao Chavan Government Medical College and Shri Guru Gobind Singhji Institute of Engineering and Technology.

== Governance ==
The city of Nanded is managed by the Nanded-Waghala Municipal Corporation (NWCMC). The corporation consists of 81 democratically elected members. The Municipal Commissioner is the Chief Executive of the corporation.

=== Municipal finance ===
According to financial data published on the CityFinance Portal of the Ministry of Housing and Urban Affairs, the Nanded-Waghala Municipal Corporation reported total revenue receipts of ₹239 crore (US$29 million) and total expenditure of ₹225 crore (US$27 million) in 2022–23. Tax revenue accounted for about 45.2% of the total revenue, while the corporation received ₹99 crore in grants during the financial year.

== Tourism ==
=== Nanded fort ===
Nanded Fort, also known as Nandgiri Fort, is located on the banks of the Godavari River. The Godavari River encircles the fort on three sides. The fort has been converted into a garden to attract tourists. There is a water tank constructed in the fort.

=== Mandir ===
The Vedic rituals are regularly performed on the ghats of Godavari River which include Urvashi Ghat, Ram Ghat, and Govardhan Ghat.

- The home minister of India Shri Shankaraoji bhauraoji chavan saheb samadhi wadgao near wajegaon
- Shri Laxmi Narsimha Mandir, Old Mondha, New Bridge.
- Kaleshwar Mandir, Vishnupuri
- Shani Mandir, Mondha
- Yagyavalkya Vedpathshala Saraswati Mandir, Shree Nagar
- Shri Yadav Ahir Samaj Mahamai Mata Mandir, Devinagar
- Ganpati Mandir, Trikut
- Hanuman Mandir, Trikut
- Datta Mandir, Trikut
- Shri Kheshtra Renuka Mata Mandir, Mahurgarh
- Siddheshwar Mandir, Hottal – built during the Chalukya era, an example of Hemadpanti temple architecture.
- Shiva Mandir, Tadkhel, Degloor Taluka – built with large stones displaying scripture by the Hindu king, Senapati.
- Jagdamba Mata Mandir, Tadkhel
- Shri Narsinh Mandir, Junna Kautha.

Shri khetra Khandoba Mandir Malegaon Yatra

=== Gurdwara ===
- Hazur Sahib was built by Maharaja Ranjit Singh. It is one of the Panj Takht, the five seats of higher authority for Sikhs. It is built at the site of cremation of Guru Gobind Singh. His remains and weapons are preserved at the site.
- Gurdwara Nagina Ghat Sahib
- Gurdwara Banda Ghat Sahib (Baba Banda Singh Bahadur)
- Gurdwara Shikaar Ghat Sahib
- Gurdwara Baoli Sahib
- Gurdwara Heera Ghat
- Gurdwara Mata Sahib
- Gurdwara Maal Tekdi
- Gurdwara Sangat Sahib
- Gurdwara Nanakpuri Sahib (place of Guru Nanak)
- Gurdwara Bhajangarh Sahib

=== Church ===
- St. Francis De Sales Catholic Church
- Methodist Church
- Bethel AG Church
- The Pentecostal Mission (Church)
- Bethesda Ministries Church

== Notable people ==
- Banda Singh Bahadur, a Sikh military commander.
- Datta Bhagat, an Ambedkarite author.
- Ashok Chavan, former Chief Minister of Maharashtra state and former Member of Parliament of the Nanded Loksabha constituency and current member of Rajya Sabha.
- Shankarrao Chavan, the former Chief minister for 15 years, and former Home minister of Maharashtra state. the highest second largest Post of India was home minister for 10 years
- Prataprao Govindrao Chikhalikar, former Member of Parliament and former MLA
- Ajit Gopchade, Member of Parliament and former MLA, Karsevak
- Syed Sadatullah Husaini, president (Amir) of Jamaat-e-Islami Hind (JIH).
- Kamalkishor Kadam, a former minister of education.
- Nagnath Lalujirao Kottapalle, former Vice-chancellor of BAMU, an educationalist and an author.
- Vaman Pandit, a Marathi scholar and a poet.
- Guru Gobind Singh, the last Sikh Guru who died in Nanded.
- Suraj Yengde, academic specializing in caste studies.

== See also ==
- Marathwada
