= List of institutions of higher education in Maharashtra =

In Maharashtra, there is one central university, twenty three state universities and twenty-one deemed universities.

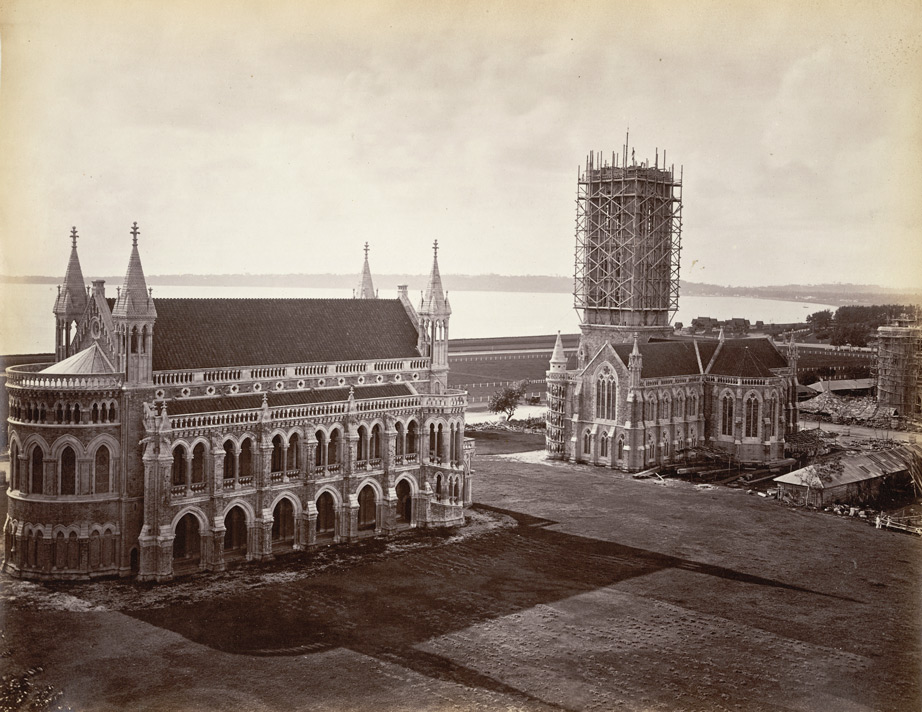
The main building of University of Mumbai, established 1856, the oldest university in Maharashtra; the photo is from the 1870s.

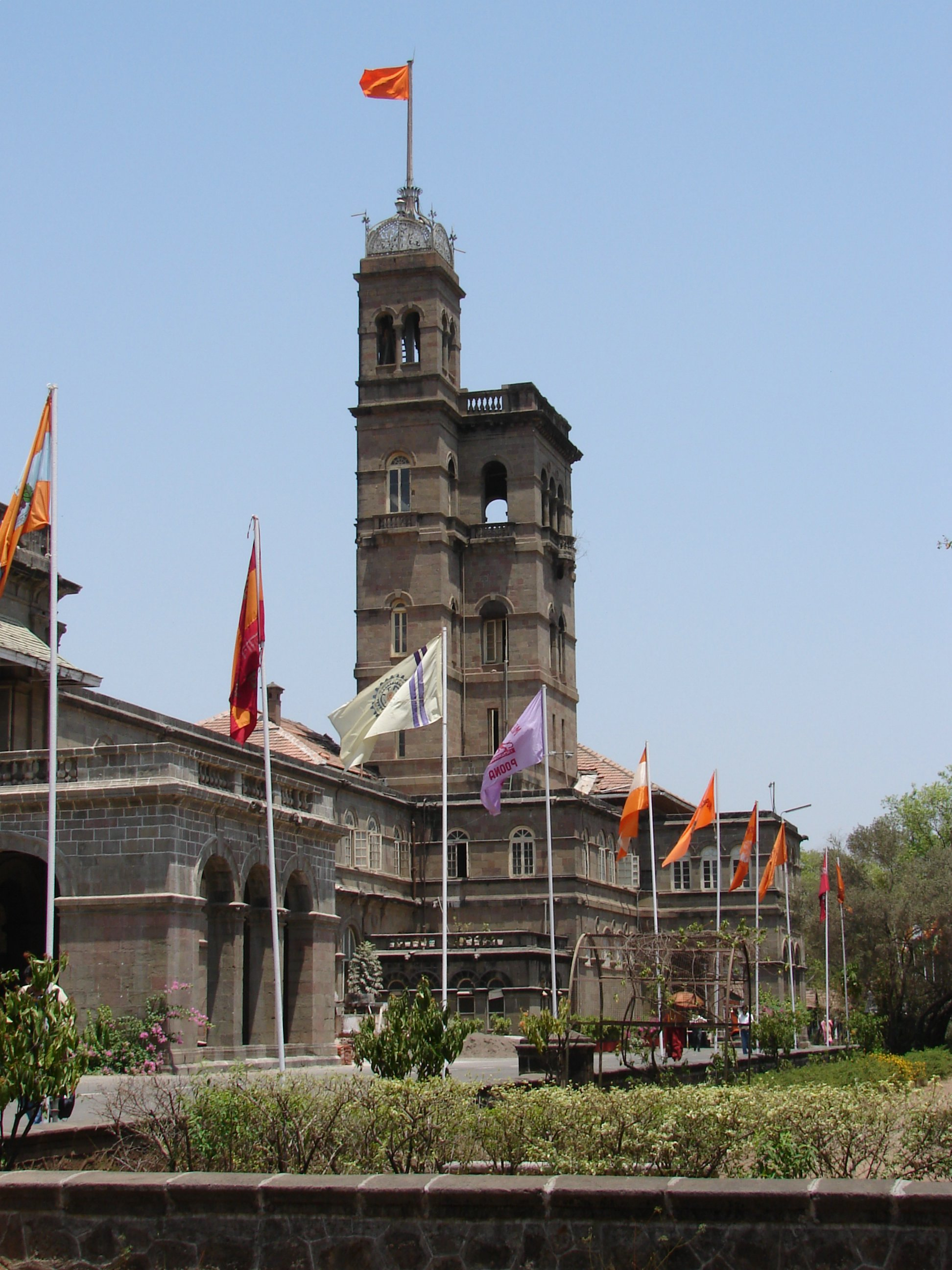
The main building of the Savitribai Phule Pune University, established in 1948.

== Universities ==
=== Central University ===
- Mahatma Gandhi Antarrashtriya Hindi Vishwavidyalaya, Wardha.

=== State Universities ===
University	Location	Establishment	Specialisation	Sources
Dr. Babasaheb Ambedkar Marathwada University	Aurangabad	1958	General	
Maharashtra State Board of Technical Education	Mumbai	1963	Technical Education	
Dr. Babasaheb Ambedkar Technological University	Lonere, Raigad	1989	Technology	
Dr. Balasaheb Sawant Konkan Krishi Vidyapeeth	Dapoli, Ratnagiri	1972	Agriculture	
Gondwana University	Gadchiroli	2011	General	
Kavikulguru Kalidas Sanskrit University	Ramtek, Nagpur	1997	Sanskrit	
Maharashtra Animal and Fishery Sciences University	Nagpur	2000	Veterinary, Fishery, Dairy	
Maharashtra University of Health Sciences	Nashik	2000	Healthcare	
Mahatma Phule Krishi Vidyapeeth	Rahuri, Ahmednagar	1968	Agriculture	
North Maharashtra University	Jalgaon	1991	General	
Dr. Panjabrao Deshmukh Krishi Vidyapeeth	Akola	1969	Agriculture	
Rashtrasant Tukadoji Maharaj Nagpur University	Nagpur	1923	General	
Sant Gadge Baba Amravati University	Amravati	1983	General	
Savitribai Phule Pune University	Pune	1949	General	
Shivaji University	Kolhapur	1962	General	
SNDT Women's University	Mumbai	1916 (1951^{†})	Women's only	
University of Solapur	Solapur	2004	General	
Swami Ramanand Teerth Marathwada University	Nanded	1995	General	
University of Mumbai	Mumbai	1857	General	
Vasantrao Naik Marathwada Krishi Vidyapeeth	Parbhani	1972	Agriculture	
Yashwantrao Chavan Maharashtra Open University	Nashik	1990	Distance education	
MIT Vishwaprayag University	Solapur	2020	General	

^{†} granted university / State university status |

==== National Law Universities ====
University	Location	Estd	Specialisation	Type	Website
Maharashtra National Law University, Mumbai	Mumbai	2015	Law	Government	nlumumbai.edu.in
Maharashtra National Law University, Nagpur	Nagpur	2016	Law	Government	nlunagpur.ac.in
Maharashtra National Law University, Aurangabad	Aurangabad	2017	Law	Government	mnlua.in

=== Deemed Universities ===
University	Location	Estd	Specialisation	Sources
Bharati Vidyapeeth	Pune	1964 (1996)	General	
Central Institute of Fisheries Education	Mumbai	1961 (1989)	Fisheries science	
Chinmaya Vishwavidyapeeth	Mumbai	2017	Indic Studies	
D. Y. Patil Education Society	Kolhapur	1987 (2005)	Medicine	
Datta Meghe Institute of Medical Sciences	Wardha	1950 (2005)	Medical science	
Deccan College Post-Graduate and Research Institute	Pune	1821 (1990)	Archeology, linguistics	
Defence Institute of Advanced Technology	Pune	1952 (2000)	Arms technology	
Dr. D. Y. Patil Vidyapeeth	Pune	1996 (2003)	Medical science	
Gokhale Institute of Politics and Economics	Pune	1930 (1993)	Economics	
Homi Bhabha National Institute	Mumbai	2005	Science, Technology	
Indira Gandhi Institute of Development Research	Mumbai	1987 (1995)	Economics	
Institute of Chemical Technology	Mumbai	1933 (2008)	Chemical engineering	
International Institute for Population Sciences	Mumbai	1956 (1985)	Population studies	
Krishna Institute of Medical Sciences	Satara	1982 (2005)	Medical science	
MGM Institute of Health Sciences	Navi Mumbai	1982 (2006)	Healthcare	
SVKM's NMIMS	Mumbai	1981 (2003)	General	
Pravara Institute of Medical Sciences	Ahmednagar	1976 (2003)	Medical science	
Symbiosis International University	Pune	1971 (2002)	General	
Tata Institute of Fundamental Research	Mumbai	1945 (2002)	Pure research	
Tata Institute of Social Sciences	Mumbai	1936 (1964)	Social sciences	
Tilak Maharashtra University	Pune	1921 (1987)	General	

=== Private Universities ===
Private universities are approved by the UGC. They can grant degrees but they are not allowed to have off-campus affiliated colleges.

- Pillai University
- Universal AI University, Karjat
- DY Patil Agriculture and Technical University Talsande Kolhapur (First State private agriculture University in Maharashtra).

=== Central Government ===
- Central Institute of Plastics Engineering and Technology, Aurangabad
- IIT Bombay
- Indian Institute of Information Technology, Nagpur
- Indian Institute of Information Technology, Pune
- Indian Institute of Science Education and Research, Pune
- National Fire Service College, Nagpur
- National Institute of Electronics & Information Technology
- Indian Institute of Management Mumbai
- National Power Training Institute, Nagpur
- Indian Institute of Management, Nagpur
- Visvesvaraya National Institute of Technology Nagpur
- All India Institute of Medical Sciences, Nagpur
- Central Institute of Plastics Engineering and Technology, Chandrapur

=== Government of Maharashtra ===
Government of Maharashtra's Engineering Colleges
College	Location	Type	Autonomy Status	Affiliation	Estd	Website
College of Engineering, Pune	Pune	Government	University	COEP Technological University	1854	www.coeptech.ac.in
Government College of Engineering, Chhatrapati Sambhajinagar	Aurangabad	Government	Autonomous	Dr. Babasaheb Ambedkar Marathwada University	1960	geca.ac.in
Government College of Engineering, Karad	Karad	Government	Autonomous	Shivaji University	1960	gcekarad.ac.in
Government College of Engineering, Amravati	Amravati	Government	Autonomous	Sant Gadge Baba Amravati University	1964	gcoea.ac.in
Government College of Engineering, Jalgaon	Jalgaon	Government	Autonomous	North Maharashtra University	1996	gcoej.ac.in
Government College of Engineering, Chandrapur	Chandrapur	Government	Non-Autonomous	Gondwana University	1996	gcoec.ac.in
Government College of Engineering and Research, Avasari	Avasari (Khurd), Pune	Government	Non-Autonomous	Savitribai Phule Pune University	2009	gcoeara.ac.in
Government College of Engineering, Nagpur	Nagpur	Government	Non-Autonomous	Rashtrasant Tukadoji Maharaj Nagpur University	2016	gcoen.ac.in
Government College of Engineering, Yavatmal	Yavatmal	Government	Non-Autonomous	Dr. Babasaheb Ambedkar Technological University	2018	gcoey.ac.in

Government of Maharashtra's-Aided Engineering Colleges
College	Location	Type	Autonomy Status	Affiliation	Estd	Website
Veermata Jijabai Technological Institute	Mumbai	Government-Aided	Autonomous	University of Mumbai	1887	vjti.ac.in
Walchand College of Engineering, Sangli	Sangli	Government-Aided	Autonomous	Shivaji University, Kolhapur	1947	walchandsangli.ac.in
Shri Guru Gobind Singhji Institute of Engineering and Technology	Nanded	Government-Aided	Autonomous	Swami Ramanand Teerth Marathwada University	1981	sggs.ac.in
Sardar Patel College of Engineering	Mumbai	Government-Aided	Autonomous	University of Mumbai	1995	spit.ac.in

=== University managed ===
College	Location	Type	Autonomy Status	Affiliation/University Department of	Estd	Website
Laxminarayan Innovation Technological University	Nagpur	State University Department	Non-Autonomous	Rashtrasant Tukadoji Maharaj Nagpur University	1942	litnagpur.in
University Department of Sant Gadge Baba Amravati University	Amravati	State University Department	Non-Autonomous	Sant Gadge Baba Amravati University	1993	sgbau.ac.in
University Institute of Chemical Technology, North Maharashtra University	Jalgaon	State University Department	Non-Autonomous	North Maharashtra University	1994	nmu.ac.in/udct/
University Department of Chemical Technology, Aurangabad	Aurangabad	State University Department	Non-Autonomous	Dr. Babasaheb Ambedkar Marathwada University	1998	bamu.ac.in
Department of Technology, Shivaji University	Kolhapur	State University Department	Non-Autonomous	Shivaji University, Kolhapur	2006	apps.unishivaji.ac.in
H.P.T Arts and R.Y.K. Science College	Nashik	State University Department	Non-Autonomous	Savitribai Phule Pune University, Pune	1924	hptrykcollege

College	Location	Type	Autonomy Status	Affiliation/Managed by University	Estd	Website
Dr. Babasaheb Ambedkar Technological University	Lonere, Raigad	State University Managed	Autonomous	Dr. Babasaheb Ambedkar Technological University	1989	dbatu.ac.in
Usha Mittal Institute of Technology	Mumbai	State University Managed (Un-Aided)	Non-Autonomous	SNDT Women's University	1997	umit.ac.in

=== Deemed University (State funded) ===
University	Location	Type	Autonomy Status	Estd	Website
Institute of Chemical Technology	Mumbai	State funded - Deemed University	Autonomous	1933	ictmumbai.edu.in

== Medical ==
=== Central government ===
- All India Institute of Medical Sciences, Nagpur

=== State government ===
College	Location	Affiliation	Estd	Website
Armed Forces Medical College	Pune	Maharashtra University of Health Sciences	1948	afmc.nic.in
B. J. Medical College	Pune	Maharashtra University of Health Sciences	1946	bjmcpune.org
Bombay Hospital Institute of Medical Sciences	Mumbai	Maharashtra University of Health Sciences	1985	bombayhospital.com
Dr. Shankarrao Chavan Government Medical College	Nanded	Maharashtra University of Health Sciences	1988	drscgmcnanded.com
Dr. V. M. Government Medical College	Solapur	Maharashtra University of Health Sciences	1963	vmgmc-hsolapur.org
ESI-PGIMSR (Post Graduate Institute of Medical Science & Research)	Andheri,Mumbai	Maharashtra University of Health Sciences	2011	esipgimsrandherimumbai.gov.in
ESI-PGIMSR (Post Graduate Institute of Medical Science & Research)	Parel, Mumbai	Maharashtra University of Health Sciences	2011	esipgimsrmgmhparelmumbai.gov.in
Government Medical College and Hospital, Nagpur	Nagpur	Maharashtra University of Health Sciences	1947	gmcnagpur.gov.in
Government Medical College, Aurangabad	Aurangabad	Maharashtra University of Health Sciences	1956	gmcaurangabad.com
Government Medical College	Miraj, Sangli	Maharashtra University of Health Sciences	1962	gmcmiraj.co.in
Government Medical College	Akola	Maharashtra University of Health Sciences	2002	gmcakola.in
Government Medical College	Latur	Maharashtra University of Health Sciences	2002	www.gmclatur.org
Government Medical College	Chandrapur	Maharashtra University of Health Sciences	2015	gmcchandrapur.org
Government Medical College	Gondia	Maharashtra University of Health Sciences	2016	gmcgondia.in
Grant Medical College and Sir JJ Group of Hospitals	Mumbai	Maharashtra University of Health Sciences	1845	gmcjjh.org
Indira Gandhi Government Medical College	Nagpur	Maharashtra University of Health Sciences	1968	iggmc.org
Lokmanya Tilak Municipal Medical College and General Hospital	Mumbai	Maharashtra University of Health Sciences	1964	ltmgh.com
R. C. S. M Government Medical College and C. P. R. Hospital	Kolhapur	Maharashtra University of Health Sciences	2000	rcsmgmc.ac.in
Rajiv Gandhi Medical College	Thane	Maharashtra University of Health Sciences	1992	-
Seth G.S. Medical College and King Edward Memorial Hospital	Mumbai	Maharashtra University of Health Sciences	1926	kem.edu
Shri Bhausaheb Hire Government Medical College, Dhule	Dhule	Maharashtra University of Health Sciences	1989	sbhgmc.org
Shri Vasantrao Naik Government Medical College	Yavatmal	Maharashtra University of Health Sciences	2000	vngmcytl.org
Swami Ramanand Teerth Rural Medical College	Ambajogai	Maharashtra University of Health Sciences	1975	srtrmca.org
Tata Memorial Centre	Mumbai	Homi Bhabha National Institute	1941	tmc.gov.in
Topiwala National Medical College and BYL Nair Charitable Hospital	Mumbai	Maharashtra University of Health Sciences	1964	tnmcnair.com

== Agriculture ==
- Central Institute of Cotton Research, Nagpur
- Central Citrus Research Institute, Nagpur
- Dr. Panjabrao Deshmukh Krishi Vidyapeeth, Akola
- Vasantrao Naik Marathwada Krishi Vidyapeeth, Parbhani

== Armed force academies ==
=== Sainik School ===
- Sainik School, Satara
- Sainik School, Chandrapur

=== Tri-service Institutes ===
- National Defence Academy, Khadakwasla

=== Indian Army ===
- Army Institute of Technology
- Army Law College
- College of Military Engineering, Pune
- Defence Institute of Advanced Technology

=== Medical Personnel ===
- Armed Forces Medical College

== Other institutions ==
- National School of Leadership

== See also ==
- List of institutions of higher education in Goa
