= Ghulam Mohammad Vastanvi =

Indian Muslim scholar (1950–2025)

Khādim-ul-Quran, Mawlana Ghulam Mohammad Vastanvi

First Rector of Jamia Islamia Ishaatul Uloom
- In office 1979 – 4 May 2025
- Preceded by: "office established"
- Succeeded by: Huzaifa Vastanvi

12th Vice Chancellor of Darul Uloom Deoband
- In office 11 January 2011 – 23 July 2011
- Preceded by: Marghoobur Rahman
- Succeeded by: Abul Qasim Nomani

Personal life
- Born: 1 June 1950 Kosadi, Surat district, Bombay State, India
- Died: 4 May 2025 (aged 74) Akkalkuwa, Maharashtra, India
- Children: Saeed Vastanvi (d. 2019); Huzaifa Vastanvi; Owais Vastanvi
- Education: Darul Uloom Falah-e-Darain, Tadkeshwar; Mazahir Uloom Saharanpur
- Occupation: Islamic scholar; educationist

Religious life
- Religion: Islam
- Denomination: Sunni
- Founder of: Jamia Islamia Ishaatul Uloom; Indian Institute of Medical Science and Research
- Jurisprudence: Hanafi
- Tariqa: Chishti
- Creed: Maturidi
- Movement: Deobandi

Muslim leader
- Disciple of: Siddique Ahmad Bandwi; Yunus Jaunpuri

Ghulam Mohammad Vastanvi (1 June 1950 – 4 May 2025), also written as Ghulam Mohammed Vastanvi, was an Indian Islamic scholar and educationist, known for his efforts to incorporate contemporary disciplines into traditional Islamic education. He was the founder and rector of Jamia Islamia Ishaatul Uloom in Akkalkuwa, Maharashtra. This institution hosts India's first minority-owned medical college recognized by the Medical Council of India (MCI). Vastanvi also briefly served as the Vice Chancellor of Darul Uloom Deoband in 2011.

== Early life and education ==
Ghulam Mohammad Vastanvi was born on 1 June 1950 in Kosadi, the Surat district, Gujarat. In 1952 or 1953, his family moved to Vastan, from which his surname is derived. Vastanvi began his early education at Madrasa Quwat-ul-Islam in Kosadi, where he memorized the Quran.

He later studied at Madrasa Shams-ul-Uloom in Baroda and pursued further education at Madrasa Falah-e-Darain in Tadkesar (also spelled Tadkeshwar), Gujarat, beginning in 1964. He studied there for eight years and completed his studies in early 1972 under scholars such as Ahmad Bemat, Abdullah Kapodrawi, Sher Ali Khan Afghani, and Zulfiqar Ali.

In late 1972, Vastanvi enrolled at Mazahir Uloom in Saharanpur, Uttar Pradesh. There, he studied advanced Islamic sciences, including hadith, under scholars such as Muhammad Younus Jaunpuri. He completed his education in 1973. In addition to his Islamic studies, Vastanvi also earned an MBA degree.

In 1970, while studying at Falah-e-Darain, he established a reformative relationship with Zakariyya Kandhlawi. After Kandhlawi's death in 1982, he sought spiritual guidance from Siddique Ahmad Bandwi, who later authorized him in Sufism. He also received authorization in Sufism from Younus Jaunpuri.

== Career ==
After completing his studies, Vastanvi began teaching in Bodhan, a village in Surat district, for ten days. Later in 1973, he joined Darul Uloom Kantharia in Bharuch, where he taught Persian and intermediate-level Islamic sciences.

In 1979, he founded Jamia Islamia Ishaatul Uloom in Akkalkuwa, Maharashtra. Initially, the institution operated with limited resources, starting with six students and one teacher in a small location. Over time, it expanded significantly and became a notable institution blending Islamic and contemporary education. Vastanvi moved permanently to Akkalkuwa to manage the institution effectively. He served as the rector of the institution from its inception in 1979 until his death on 4 May 2025. Following his passing, his son, Huzaifa Vastanvi was elected as the new rector by the members of the Jamia's council.

The institution includes primary and higher secondary schools, Bachelor of Education (B.Ed.) and Diploma in Education (D.Ed.) colleges, as well as vocational programmes. Professional courses such as engineering, pharmacy, and a medical college recognized by the MCI are also offered. Additionally, the institution provides vocational training in fields such as IT, office management, tailoring, and software development. The aim of this blended education model is to prepare students for both religious and contemporary societal roles.

Vastanvi, in addition to founding and managing Jamia Islamia Ishaatul Uloom, also established various educational and welfare institutions across India. He was actively involved in managing and overseeing these and other institutions throughout the country.

In 1998 (1419 AH), Vastanvi became a member of the governing council (Majlis-e-Shura) of Darul Uloom Deoband and also served as a member in his capacity as Vice-Chancellor during his tenure. He remained a council member until his death.

=== Vice-chancellorship and challenges at Darul Uloom Deoband ===
Vastanvi was elected Vice-Chancellor of Darul Uloom Deoband on 11 January 2011, a decision regarded as a reformist shift in the institution's leadership. However, his conciliatory remarks regarding the 2002 Gujarat riots sparked controversy, leading to criticism from various quarters. These statements were perceived as misaligned with the traditional ethos of the seminary, resulting in internal disagreements. On 23 July 2011, Vastanvi was removed from his position amidst mounting pressure and internal differences.

Following his removal, Vastanvi stated that he was "punished for no fault" and that his remarks had been taken out of context. He emphasized that his intention was solely to focus on the progress of the Muslim community and to bring reforms to strengthen the institution. According to him, his dismissal was a result of opposition from anti-reform elements and internal politics.

In a later clarification, Vastanvi stated that he had never given a "clean chit" to Narendra Modi and that his words were distorted by the media. He described the 2002 Gujarat violence as a "state-sponsored pogrom" which could not be erased from the memory of Muslims, and called for justice for the victims.

In a later clarification, Vastanvi stated that he had never given a "clean chit" to Narendra Modi and alleged that his words had been distorted by the media. He said that the 2002 Gujarat violence was a "state-sponsored pogrom" which, according to him, could not be erased from the memory of Muslims, and he called for justice for the victims.

== Death ==
Vastanvi died in Akkalkuwa on 4 May 2025, at the age of 74. (Note: Sources mislabel his age as "75".)
