= Jamia Islamia Ishaatul Uloom =

Educational institution in Nandurbar, Maharashtra, India

Coordinates: 21°33′37″N 74°01′8″E

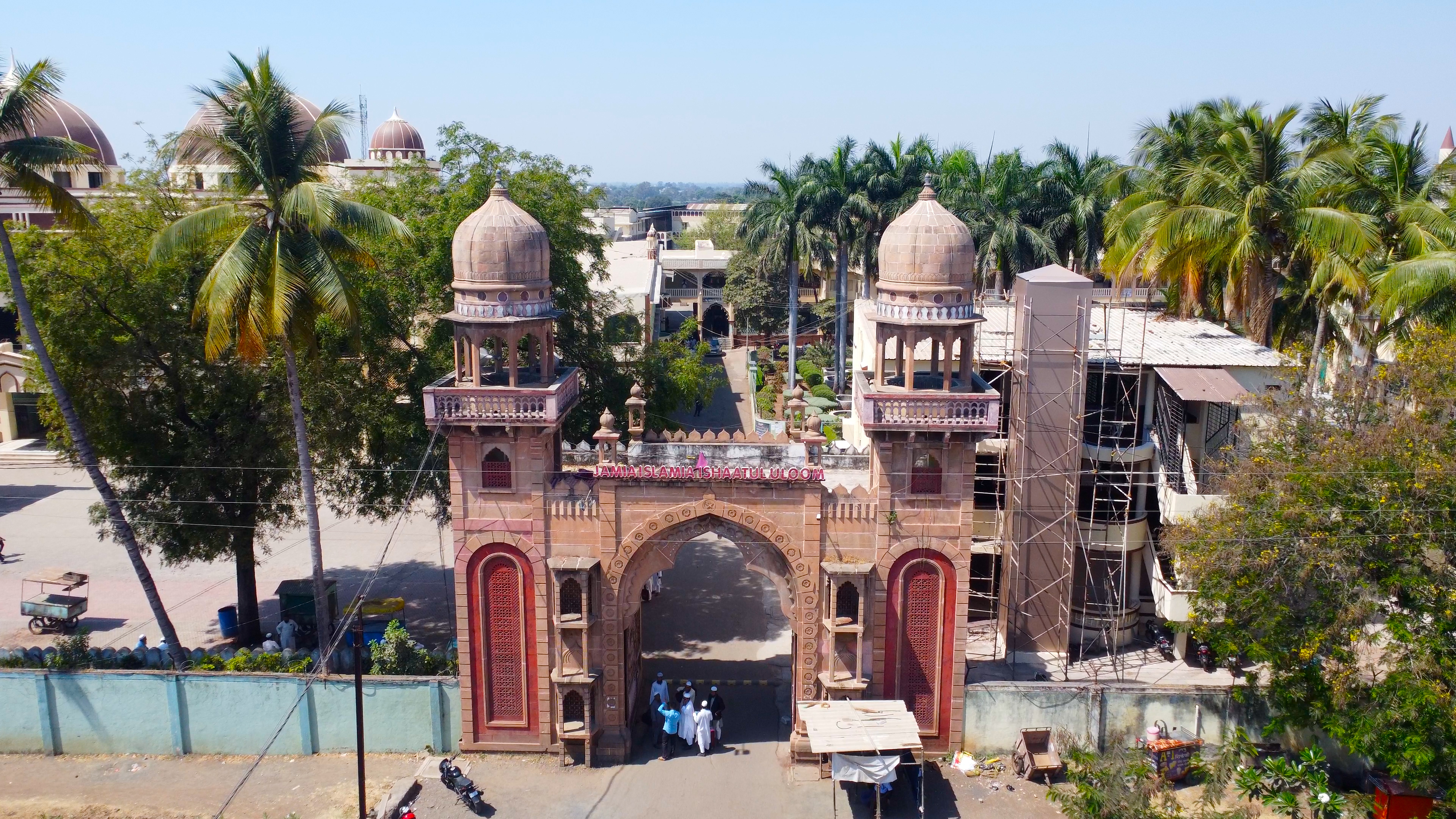
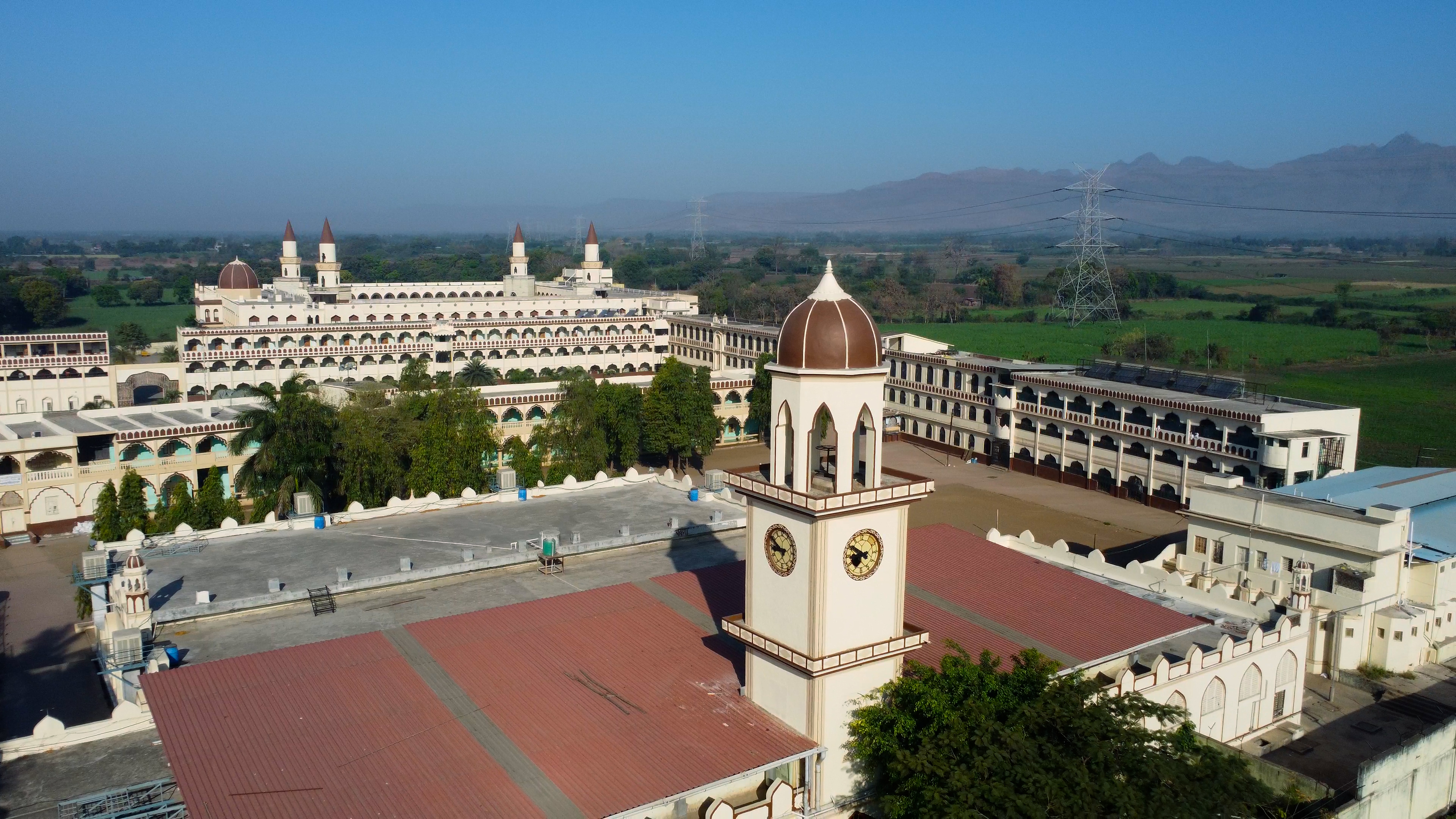
- Bab-e-Siddique (left) and Masjid-e-Maimani (right) at Jamia Islamia Ishaatul Uloom, Akkalkuwa.
- Type: Islamic and Contemporary Educational and Welfare Institution
- Established: 1979; 47 years ago
- Founder: Ghulam Mohammad Vastanvi
- Affiliations: Welfare Commission
- Chairman: Huzaifa Vastanvi
- Total staff: 900
- Students: 15,000
- Location: Akkalkuwa, Nandurbar District, Maharashtra, India
- Campus: Rural, 90 acres
- Website: jamiaakkalkuwa.com

Jamia Islamia Ishaatul Uloom (Urdu: جامعہ اسلامیہ اشاعت العلوم) is an educational institution located in Akkalkuwa, Nandurbar District, Maharashtra, India. Established in 1979 by Ghulam Mohammad Vastanvi, the institution provides a combination of traditional Islamic education and contemporary academic disciplines, including engineering, medicine, and pharmacy.

== History ==
Jamia Islamia Ishaatul Uloom was established in 1979 in Akkalkuwa, Maharashtra, as a seminary with six students and one teacher. It was founded by Ghulam Mohammad Vastanvi with the objective of providing Islamic education to the local community. Over time, the institution expanded its scope to include contemporary academic programs alongside traditional religious studies.

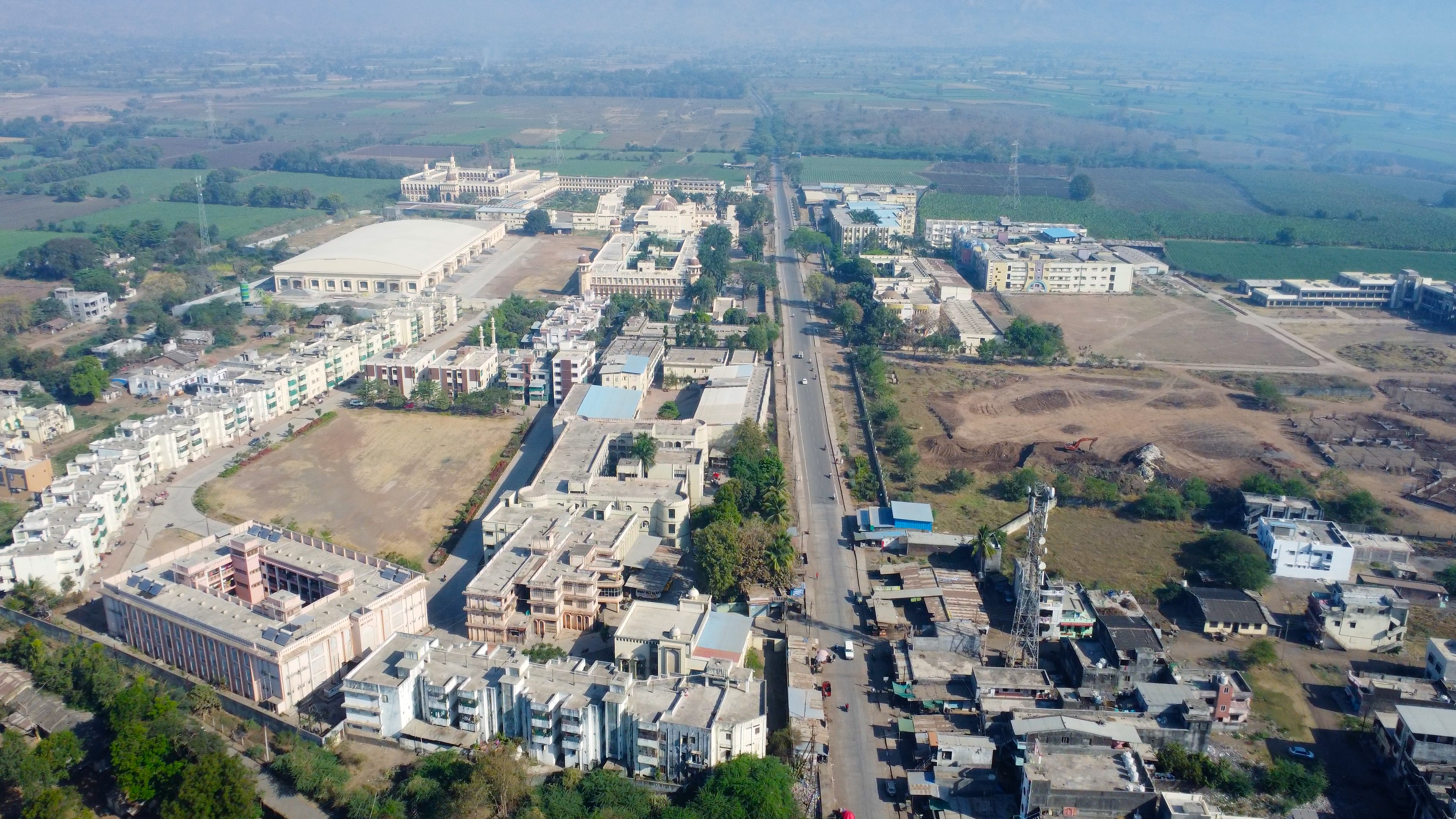
Aerial View of Jamia Islamia Ishaatul Uloom, Akkalkuwa

== Educational approach ==
The institution integrates traditional Islamic studies, such as Quran memorization and Arabic, with modern academic disciplines, including science and technology. The institution provides education from kindergarten to postgraduate levels, aiming to prepare students for both religious and contemporary professional contexts. This balanced approach reflects its commitment to blending traditional values with modern educational practices.

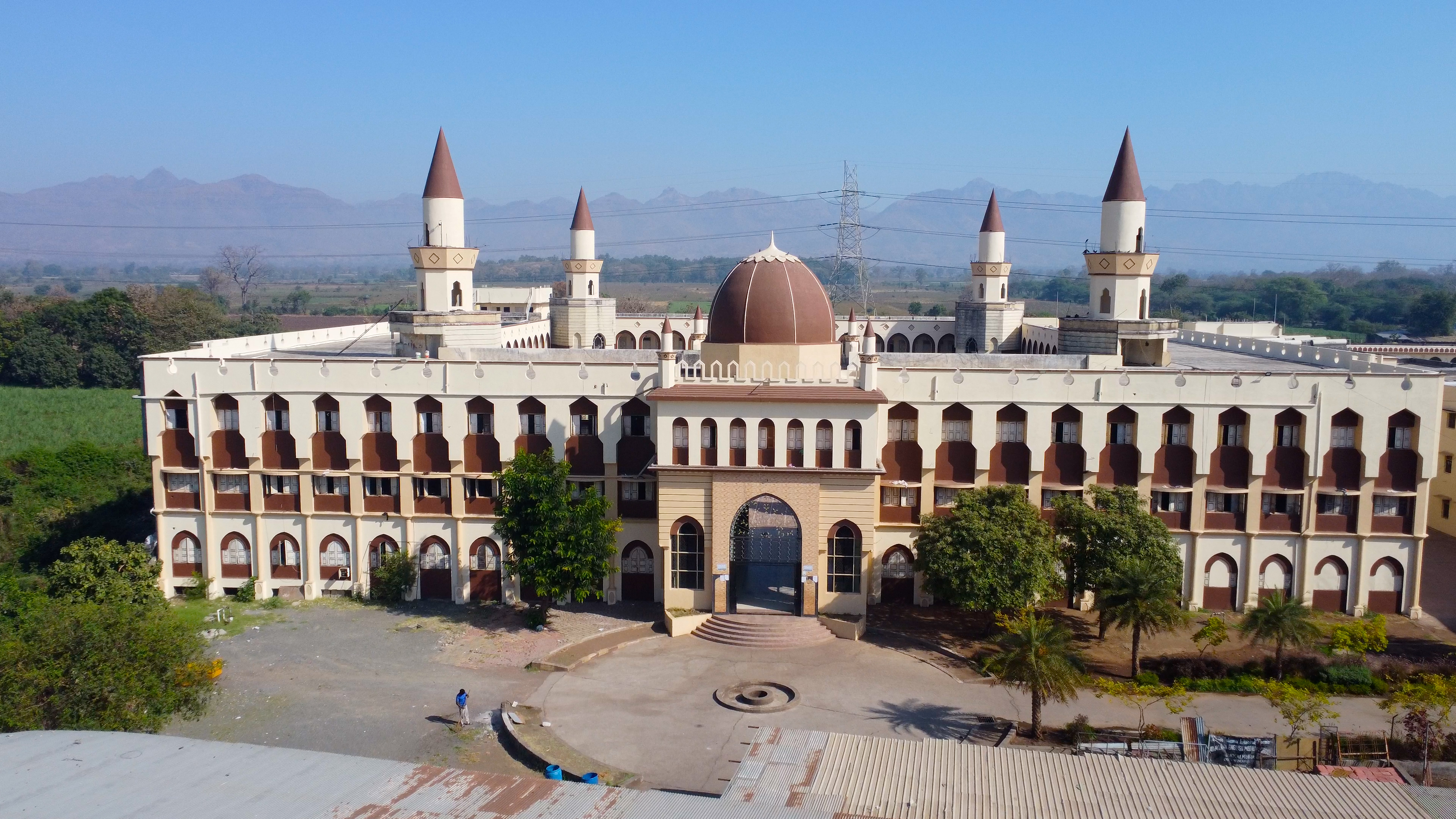
The Deeniyat Building housing the primary section of Jamia Islamia Ishaatul Uloom, Akkalkuwa

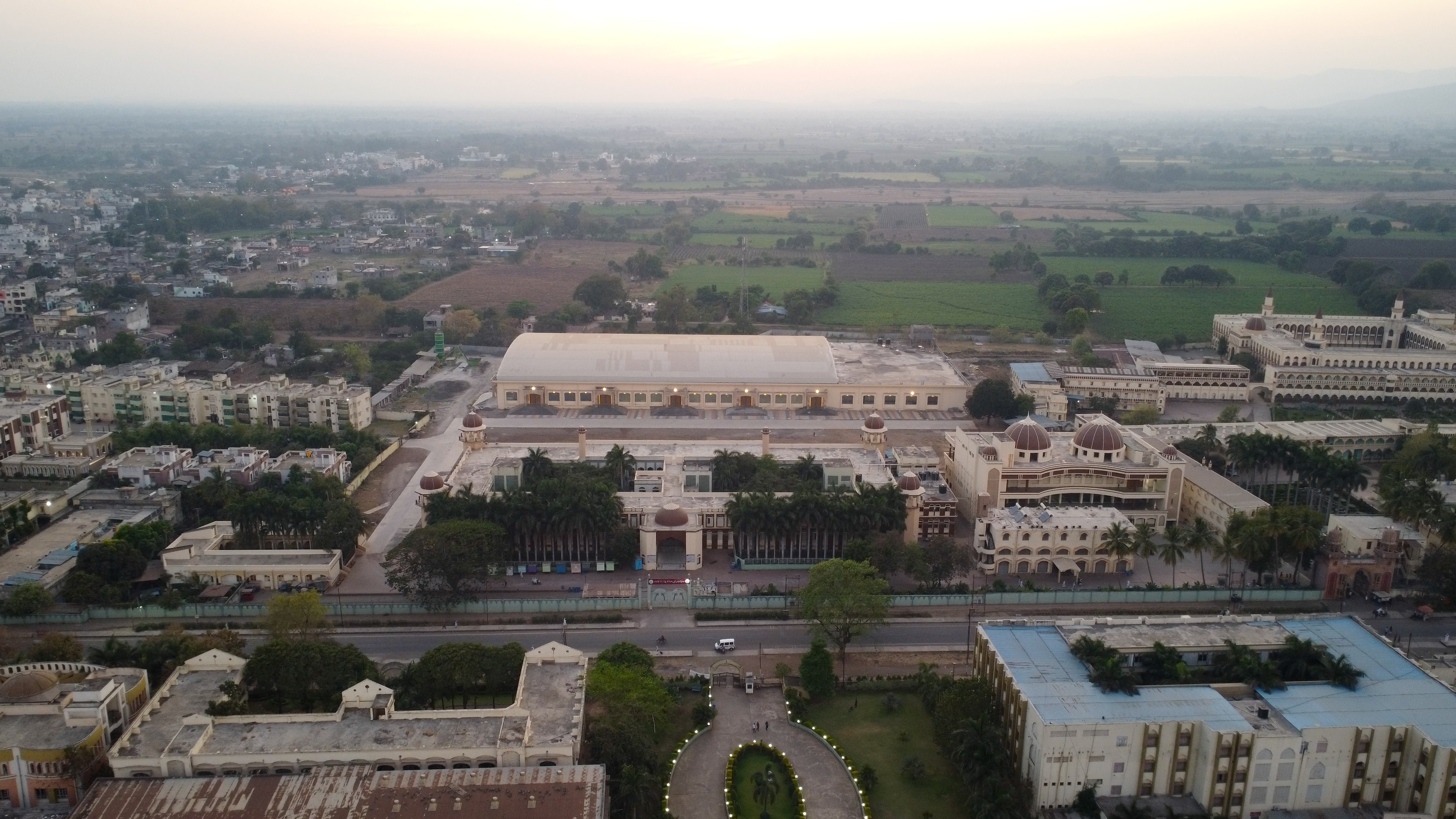
Aerial View of Darul Quran (The House of Memorization of the Quran), Jamia Islamia Ishaatul Uloom, Akkalkuwa

By promoting a combination of religious and modern education, the institution seeks to address societal needs and encourage personal and professional development. It emphasizes the importance of producing individuals equipped with the knowledge and skills to contribute to community welfare.

== Academic programs ==
The institution offers a blend of Islamic and contemporary education, catering to students from primary to postgraduate levels. The Islamic education curriculum includes Quran memorization (Hifz), Tajweed and Qira'at, and advanced Islamic studies such as Aalimiyat and Fazilat, alongside specializations in Islamic jurisprudence (Fiqh), Hadith studies, Dawah and guidance, and Arabic and English language programs. These programs aim to provide a comprehensive understanding of Islamic teachings while addressing their practical application in modern contexts.

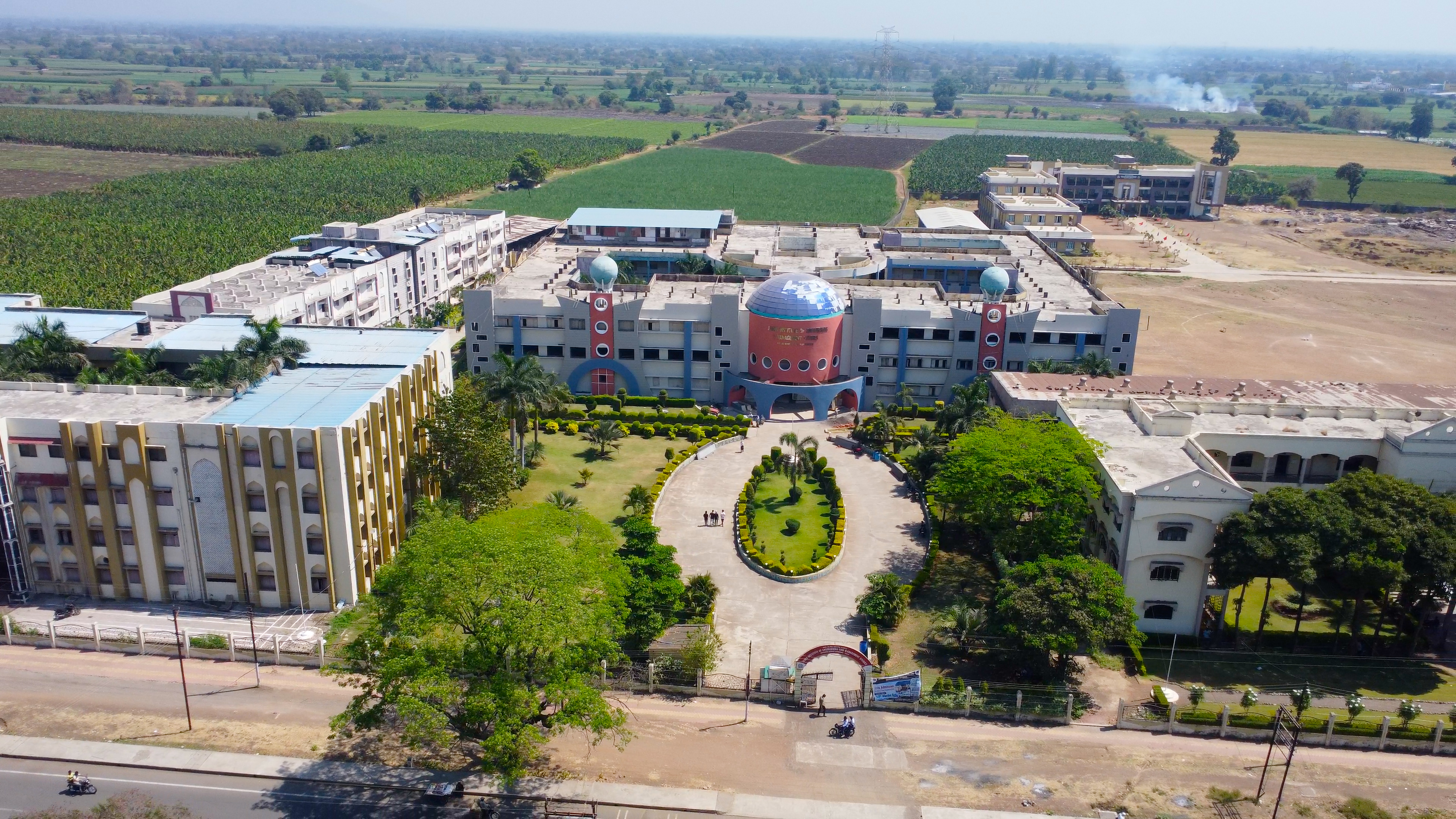
Aerial View of Jamia Institute of Engineering and Management Studies, Akkalkuwa

In addition to Islamic studies, the institution emphasizes contemporary education, which began with the establishment of an Industrial Training Institute (ITI) in 1993. Over time, this initiative expanded to include Urdu- and English-medium schools, engineering and pharmacy programs, Bachelor of Education (B.Ed.) and Diploma in Education (D.Ed.), and medical education, including an MBBS college and General Nursing and Midwifery (GNM) programs. Vocational training courses in office automation, tailoring, bookbinding, and software development further enhance the institution's offerings. This integrated educational approach aims to prepare students for both religious and professional roles, enabling them to contribute effectively to society.

== Social services ==
The institution has been involved in various social welfare activities alongside its educational initiatives. It has contributed to the establishment of madrasas, schools, colleges, and healthcare facilities in several regions, aiming to support community development and address local needs. Additionally, vocational training programs have been introduced to enhance skill development in underserved communities.

The institution manages several healthcare initiatives, including the Indian Institute of Medical Science and Research (IIMSR) and Noor Hospital in Jalna district, recognized by the Medical Council of India (now National Medical Commission) . These facilities provide healthcare services to diverse communities. In addition, Ahmad Gharib Unani Medical College in Akkalkuwa and Maharashtra's 26th Darul Qaza, established under the All India Muslim Personal Law Board, reflect Jamia's engagement in education, healthcare, and legal support.

These contributions underscore Jamia’s role in addressing community needs through a combination of educational, healthcare, and legal initiatives.

== Controversies ==
In February 2025, Maharashtra minister and BJP leader Nitesh Rane alleged that Jamia Islamia Ishaatul Uloom in Akkalkuwa had illegally sheltered a Yemeni national without a valid visa. According to Rane, the institute provided the individual with accommodation and various official documents, including an Aadhaar card, PAN card, birth certificate, and a bank account. An FIR was filed by the Akkalkuwa police against the Yemeni national, his family members, and officials of the institute under the Bharatiya Nyaya Sanhita, 2023 and the Indian Telegraph Act, 1885.

Rane also urged the Maharashtra government to conduct a state-wide investigation into all madrasas, questioning whether they were genuinely educational or involved in promoting terrorism. In comments to IANS reported by Muslim Mirror, he warned of potential links to extremist groups such as the Taliban and rhetorically asked whether students were being made into scholars or into "Osama Bin Laden." He further suggested shutting down all madrasas if such activities continued.

These remarks were met with strong criticism. The Maharashtra unit of Jamaat-e-Islami Hind condemned Rane's statements, calling them baseless, divisive, and a threat to communal harmony. Maulana Ilyas Khan Falahi, president of JIH Maharashtra, stated that Jamia Islamia Ishaatul Uloom has been recognized by the government since 1997 and serves over 15,000 students, including 1,250 Hindu students and 25 Hindu teachers. He accused Rane of attempting to malign madrasa education and intimidate minorities for political gain.
