= ACPM =

ACPM may refer to:

- ACPM Medical College, a medical school in India
- Acyl carrier protein, mitochondrial, a protein that carries a fatty acid chain and is part of respiratory complex I
- Alliance pour les chiffres de la presse et des médias, audience measurement organisation that certifies the circulation of newspapers and periodicals in France
- American College of Preventive Medicine, a professional society for physicians
- Associated Portland Cement Manufacturers Ltd, a British company later renamed Blue Circle Industries
