= Marghoobur Rahman =

Indian Islamic scholar

Amīrul Hind Thālith, Maulana Marghoobur Rahman

11th Vice-Chancellor of Darul Uloom Deoband
- In office 1982–8 December 2010
- Preceded by: Muhammad Tayyib Qasmi
- Succeeded by: Ghulam Muhammad Vastanvi

3rd Emir of Imārat-e-Shar'ia Hind
- In office 2006– 8 December 2010
- Preceded by: Asad Madani
- Succeeded by: Usman Mansoorpuri

Member of the Governing Body of Darul Uloom Deoband
- In office 1962–1981

Assistant VC of Darul Uloom Deoband
- In office 1981–1982

Personal details
- Born: 1914 Qazi Para, Bijnor district, United Provinces of Agra and Oudh, British India (now, Uttar Pradesh, India)
- Died: 8 December 2010 (aged 95–96) Bijnor, Uttar Pradesh
- Resting place: Mazar-e-Qasmi
- Children: Anwarur Rahman Bijnori
- Education: Darul Uloom Deoband

Religious life
- Religion: Islam
- Denomination: Sunni Hanafi
- Movement: Deobandi

Marghoobur Rahman (1914–8 December 2010) was an Indian Muslim scholar and Vice-Chancellor of Darul Uloom Deoband.

== Early life and education ==
Marghoobur Rahman was born on 1914 AD (1313 AH) to Mashiyyatullah Qasmi (d. 1952) in Qazi Para, Bijnor.

He received his primary and secondary education at Madrasa Rahimia Madinatul Uloom, Jama Masjid, Bijnor. He enrolled in Darul Uloom Deoband in 1348 AH (1929 AD) and graduated from Darse Nizami in 1352 AH (1933 AD). He then stayed for another year and completed the course of Islamic jurisprudence (Ifta).

At the Deoband seminary, his teachers included Hussain Ahmad Madani, Izaz Ali Amrohi, Ibrahim Balyawi, Muhammad Shafi, and Muhammad Sahool Bhagalpuri.

== Career ==
After graduation, Marghoobur Rahman was a teacher at Madrasa Rahimia Madinatul Uloom Jama Masjid, Bijnor, for a short period. Then he engaged in domestic, commercial, and social services and could not continue teaching. After graduation, he performed the duties of imam in his neighborhood mosque for 25 years without salary. In 1962 (1382 AH), he was elected as a member of the Governing Body of Darul Uloom Deoband. In May 1981 AD (Rajab 1401 AH), he was appointed the Assistant VC of Darul Uloom, and then in August 1982 (Shawwal 1402 AH), he was appointed the Vice Chancellor of Darul Uloom Deoband and served in this position for 28 years.

After the demise of Asad Madani, he was appointed the third Emir of the Imārat-e-Shar'ia Hind in 2006. As a result, he is remembered as Amir-ul-Hind Thālith (Urdu: امیر الہند ثالث). Apart from this, he was a member of the working committee of Nadwatul Ulama and Jamiat Ulema-e-Hind and a member of the advisory committee of Madrasa Shahi. Also, he was the first president of the All India Majlis-e-Tahaffuz-e-Khatm-e-Nubuwwat and the All-India Association of Islamic and Arabic Seminaries from 1995 to 2010.

=== Against terrorism ===
In February 2008, at the Deoband headquarters in Uttar Pradesh, during the All India Anti-Terrorism Conference, Bijnori stated, "There is no place for terrorism in Islam. Terrorism and killing of the innocent are against Islam."

== Death ==
Marghoobur Rahman died on 8 December 2010 (1 Muharram 1432 AH) in Bijnor and was buried in the Qasmi cemetery of Deoband.
