= Government Medical College, Chandrapur =

College in Maharashtra, India

KDK Government Medical College, Chandrapur
- कर्मवीर दादासाहेब कन्नमवार शासकीय वैद्यकीय महाविद्यालय
- Other name: GMC Chandrapur
- Type: Medical College
- Established: 2015; 11 years ago
- Accreditation: National Medical Commission
- Academic affiliations: Maharashtra University of Health Sciences
- Dean: Dr. Milind Kamble
- Faculty: 150
- Administrative staff: 250
- Students: 500
- Undergraduates: 150 per academic year
- Postgraduates: Proposed
- Location: Chandrapur, Maharashtra, India
- Website: gmcchandrapur.org
- Named after Marotrao Kannamwar Ji.

The Karmaveer Kannamwar Government Medical College, Chandrapur was founded in 2015 in Chandrapur, Maharashtra, India. The college is affiliated to MUHS, Nashik and is under Director of Medical Education and Research (DMER), Mumbai. This college is wholly funded by Government of Maharashtra. NMC permission was granted in the year 2015.

Named after Marotrao Kannamwar, 2nd Chief Minister of Maharashtra Govt. Medical College was started in the premises of District T.B Hospital (100 beds). The District Civil Hospital (100 beds) and District T.B Hospital, both run by public health department of Maharashtra were merged.

New GMCC campus is under construction, off the Chandrapur Bypass road, on 50 acres (20 ha) of land, at an estimated cost of Rs 600 crores. A Cancer hospital will also be established in the campus by TATA Cancer Care Foundation and Government of Maharashtra.

== Departments ==
=== Clinical ===
- Department of Anaesthesia
- Department of Dentistry
- Department of ENT
- Department of Medicine
- Department of Ophthalmology
- Department of Obstetrics & Gynecology
- Department of Orthopedics
- Department of Pediatrics
- Department of Psychiatry
- Department of Radiology
- Department of Skin & VD
- Department of General Surgery
- Department of Chest & TB

=== Pre-clinical ===
- Department of Anatomy
- Department of Physiology
- Department of Biochemistry

=== Para-clinical ===
- Department of Pathology
- Department of Microbiology
- Department of Pharmacology
- Department of Forensic Medicine & Toxicology
- Department of Preventive & Social Medicine

== Infrastructure overview ==
- Land area 26,364.40 square metres (283,784.0 sq ft)
- College building ground floor area 3,445.22 square metres (37,084.0 sq ft) first floor area 3,372.06 square metres (36,296.6 sq ft) second floor area 2,068.80 square metres (22,268.4 sq ft)
- College council hall 79.55 square metres (856.3 sq ft)
- Exam hall 1,009.84 square metres (10,869.8 sq ft)
- Canteen: Ground floor area 137.19 square metres (1,476.7 sq ft) first floor area 131.28 square meters
- Out Patient Department (OPD)
- 100 bedded T.B hospital building
- 100 bedded Civil hospital building
- Auditorium with advanced sound system
- Library with internet facility
- Hostels for medical students and resident doctors
- Gymnasium

== Admissions ==
The medical course of MBBS was started in the college with a total intake of 100 students in 2015. With the increase in the intake to 150 in the year 2019–20, there are a total of 500 students in the institute pursuing medical studies as of 2020. Admissions are made through CET / NEET (85% from state CET and 15% from central NEET).

== See also ==
Some other Government Medical Colleges (GMCs) nearby are:

- All India Institute of Medical Sciences, Nagpur
- Government Medical College (Nagpur)
- Indira Gandhi Government Medical College, Nagpur
- Mahatma Gandhi Institute of Medical Sciences, Wardha
- Shri Vasantrao Naik Government Medical College, Yavatmal
