= Government Medical College, Jalgaon =

Medical college and hospital in Jalgaon, Maharashtra, Indian

- Type: Medical college and hospital
- Established: 2018; 8 years ago
- Affiliations: Maharashtra University of Health Sciences, NMC
- Dean: Dr. Girish Vithalrao Thakur
- Location: Jalgaon, Maharashtra, India; 21.008807°N 75.5649816°E
- Website: http://www.gmcjalgaon.org/

Government Medical College, Jalgaon is a full-fledged tertiary Government medical college in Jalgaon, Maharashtra. The college imparts the degree Bachelor of Medicine and Bachelor of Surgery (MBBS). It is recognized by the National Medical Commission. The hospital associated with the college is one of the largest in Jalgaon district.

Selection to the college is done on the basis of merit through the National Eligibility and Entrance Test. The yearly undergraduate student intake was 100 which was then increased to 150 in 2019. In 2020, the hospital associated with the college had 205 beds.
