= Dr. Vasantrao Pawar Medical College Hospital and Research Center =

Medical school in Nashik, Maharashtra, India

Coordinates: 20.0358°N 73.8521°E

- Type: Medical college and hospital
- Established: 1990
- Affiliations: Maharashtra University of Health Sciences
- Location: Nashik, Maharashtra, India
- Website: https://drvasantraopawarmedicalcollege.com/

Dr. Vasantrao Pawar Medical College Hospital and Research Center is a full-fledged medical college in Nashik, Maharashtra. The college imparts the degree Bachelor of Medicine, Bachelor of Surgery (MBBS) and a post graduate MS course in ENT, apart from other courses. It is recognised by the Medical Council of India.

Selection to the college is done on the basis of merit through the National Eligibility and Entrance Test. Yearly undergraduate student intake is 120.

In August 2021, the college was in news for the death of a student due to heart attack.
