= Jacob Cherian =

Indian surgeon, educationist and social worker

- Born: 14 July 1923; Kollam, Travancore
- Died: 4 October 2007 (aged 84); Ambilikkai, Dindigul district, Tamil Nadu, India
- Occupations: Surgeon, social worker, educationist
- Known for: Social and education service
- Awards: 1999 Padma Bhushan

Jacob Cherian (14 July 1923 – 4 October 2007), popularly known as Ayya, was an Indian surgeon, educationist and a social worker. He was the founder of Christian Fellowship Community Health Centre Society, a non-governmental organization under which banner he established 24 primary health centres, besides 18 other institutions in the fields of health and education. Credited with the performance of over 25,000 surgeries, Cherian was a fellow of the Royal College of Surgeons of Edinburgh, an honorary fellow of the Royal College of Surgeons of Glasgow, International College of Surgeons as well as of the American College of Surgeons, and a founder fellow of the Association of Surgeons of India. The Government of India awarded him the Padma Bhushan, the third highest civilian award, in 1999.

== Biography ==
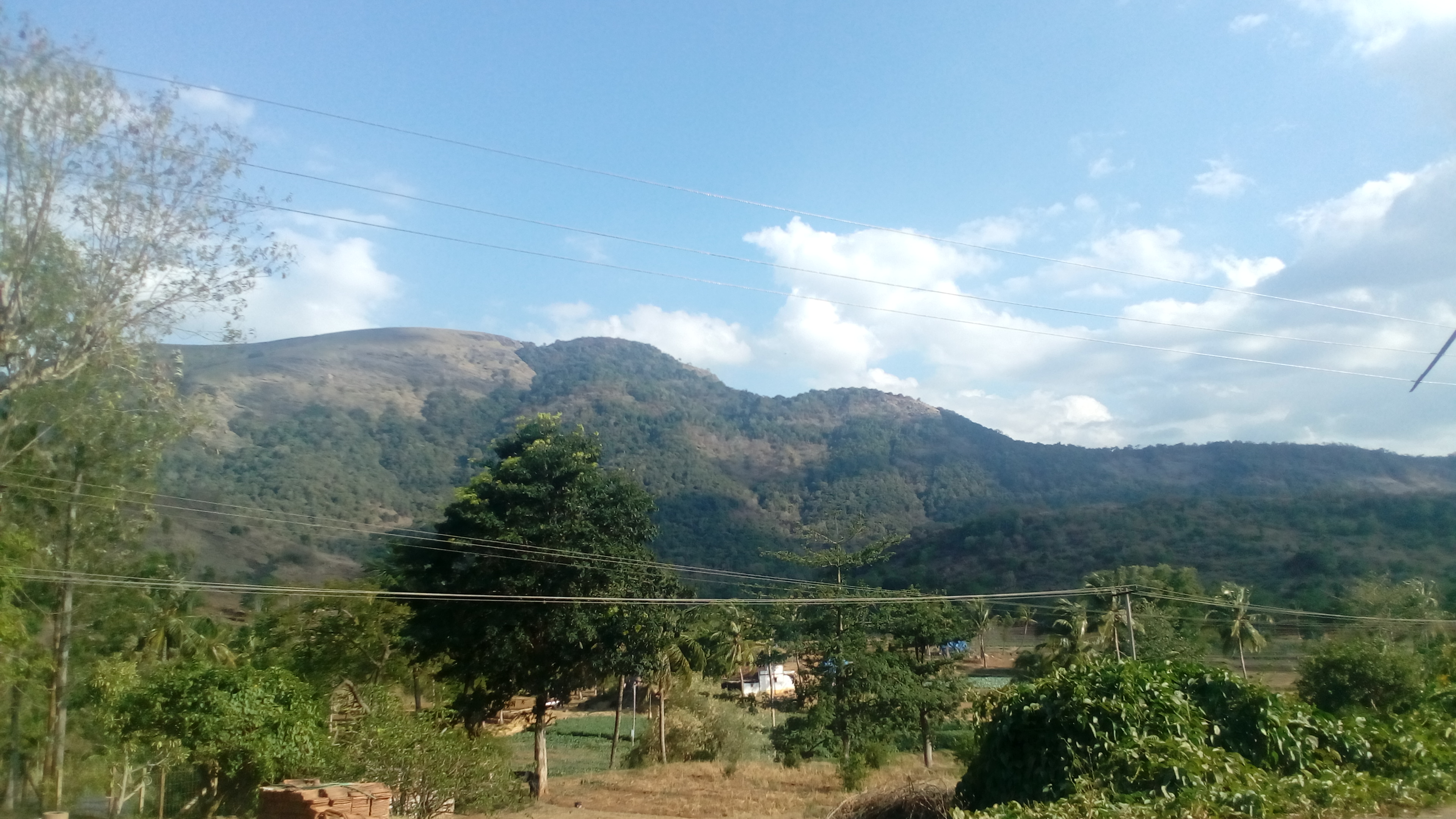
Oddanchatram hills

Jacob Cherian was born on 14 July 1923 at Kottara, a small hamlet in Kollam district of then Travancore to K. M. Jacob Kottara, better known as Kottara Achan, a priest of the Marthoma Church, who once held the Guinness Book of World Records for the longest religious service. His early college studies were at the University of Kerala and after earning a graduate degree, he studied medicine at the Government Medical College, Miraj but, later, moved to R. G. Kar Medical College and Hospital, Kolkata from where he obtained a degree in medicine in 1956. He started his medical service at Oddanchatram, a rural area in the state of Tamil Nadu where he had co-founded a small health center in 1955, along with A. K. Tharian. After becoming a fellow of the Royal College of Surgeons of Glasgow in 1961, he moved to Ambilikkai, another village in Dindigul District, and started a small hospital with 25 beds to treat leprosy and tuberculosis, two fatal diseases prevalent in the area during that time; the hospital would later develop into a 175-bedded multi-disciplinary facility, the first such recognized facility for leprosy started by an Indian. Later, he also started a rehabilitation center for leprosy patients in the village.

Subsequently, Cherian entered the education sector and two higher secondary schools, one with English as the medium of instruction and the other with Tamil, were the ones he started first. This was followed by a number of institutions which included Christian College of Engineering and Technology, Christian Polytechnic College and Christian College of Nursing. Overall, he founded 24 primary health centers and 18 institutions, all working under the aegis of Christian Fellowship Community Health Centre Society, a non-governmental organization he founded to organize the activities. During his medical career, he was reported to have carried out 25,000 surgical procedures.

Cherian was married to Mary Cherian, a pediatrician by profession and the co-founder of the institutions he founded. He died on 4 October 2007 at Ambilikkai, at the age of 84, succumbing to age-related illnesses.

== Awards and honors ==
Cherian was an honorary fellow of the Royal College of Surgeons of Edinburgh, International College of Surgeons, American College of Surgeons, and the Association of Surgeons of India. He received the Padma Bhushan, the third highest civilian award from the Government of India in 1999.
