= N.K.P. Salve Institute of Medical Sciences =

Medical college in Nagpur, India

- Type: Medical college and hospital
- Established: 1990; 36 years ago
- Affiliations: Maharashtra University of Health Sciences
- Dean: Dr. Sajal Mitra
- Location: Nagpur, Maharashtra, India; 21.1012°N 79.0020°E
- Website: nkpsims.in

N.K.P. Salve Institute of Medical Sciences is a full-fledged medical college in Nagpur, Maharashtra. The college imparts the degree Bachelor of Medicine and Bachelor of Surgery (MBBS). Established by the Vidya Shikshan Prasarak Mandals Academy of Higher Education (VSPM AHE), the college is recognised by the National Medical Commission.

Selection to the college is done on the basis of merit through the National Eligibility and Entrance Test.

In 2024, the Government of Maharashtra mandated a minimum monthly stipend for MBBS interns at private medical institutions, after 13 interns from the N.K.P. Salve Institute and Lata Mangeshkar Hospital filed a complaint in the Bombay High Court. This followed strikes by MBBS interns in 2022, when the school threatened to withhold degrees for interns who did not resume work.
