= Government Medical College & General Hospital, Baramati =

Public medical college and hospital in Baramati, Maharashtra, India

Punyashlok Ahilyadevi Holkar Government Medical College & Swargiya Ajitdada Pawar General Hospital, Baramati
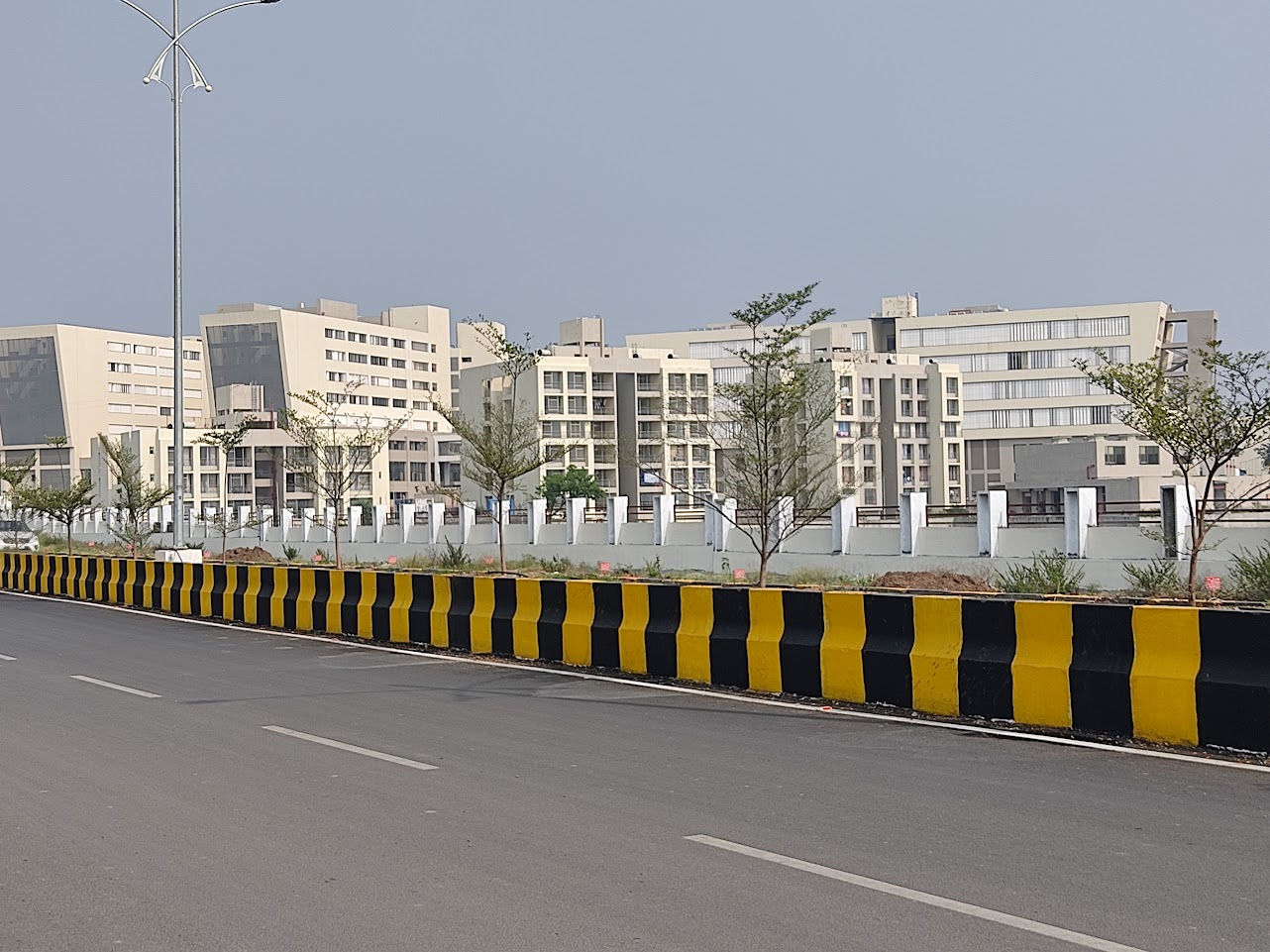
- Other names: Government Medical College, Baramati
- Type: Public; State-funded
- Established: 2019
- Academic affiliations: Maharashtra University of Health Sciences
- Dean: Dr. Chandrakant B. Mhaske
- Undergraduates: 100
- Location: Baramati, Maharashtra, India
- Campus: Rural 27 acres
- Website: www.gmcbaramati.org

Punyashlok Ahilyadevi Holkar Government Medical College & General Hospital, Baramati (GMCB) is a medical college and affiliate hospital located in Baramati, Maharashtra, India. It was founded in the year 2019. The PAH Government Medical College, Baramati is affiliated to Maharashtra University of Health Sciences, Nashik. The college is recognized by the Medical Council of India for medical education in India.

Currently, the Government Medical College, Baramati provides training to about 100 students in undergraduate medical courses. The college has five floors and parking space. The General Hospital has 21 wards and 13 operation theatres and has P+G+6 floors.

The college and the general hospital are funded by the Government of Maharashtra.

== Location ==
The medical college and general hospital are situated in the same campus near the MIDC area of Baramati, in Pune District of Maharashtra. The nearest railway junction is Daund Junction while Baramati Railway Station is the nearest railway station. Nearest airport is the Pune International Airport.

== Admissions ==
The admissions for the MBBS courses began for the first time in the year 2019 after the approval was given by the Medical Council of India in May 2019.

Currently, the intake capacity of the college is 100 students. Of the total available seats for the students, 15% are reserved for All India quota and 85% are reserved for State quota.
