= Indian Institute of Medical Science and Research =

Private medical college in Badnapur, Maharashtra, India

Indian Institute of Medical Science & Research
- Type: Private, Minority Institution
- Established: 2013; 13 years ago
- Affiliations: Maharashtra University of Health Sciences, National Medical Commission
- Chairman: Huzaifa Vastanvi
- Dean: Azhar Ahmed Siddiqui
- CEO: Bemat Ilyas Yaqub
- Location: Aurangabad-Jalna Road, Warudi, Taluka Badnapur, Jalna district, Maharashtra (431202), India, Jalna, Maharashtra, India
- Campus: Rural, 25.2 Acres
- Website: iimsr.co.in

Indian Institute of Medical Science & Research (IIMSR) is a private minority medical college situated in Warudi, Badnapur, in the Jalna district of Maharashtra, India. Established in 2013, it is affiliated with the Maharashtra University of Health Sciences and recognized by the National Medical Commission (formerly Medical Council of India). The institute aims to provide quality medical education and healthcare services.

== History ==
IIMSR was established by the Jamia Islamia Ishaatul Uloom Trust, under the leadership of Ghulam Mohammad Vastanvi. The institute received its Letter of Permission (LOP) from the Medical Council of India on 14 July 2013 and commenced its first academic session soon after.

== Academics ==
IIMSR offers a 5.5-year Bachelor of Medicine, Bachelor of Surgery (MBBS) program, which includes a one-year compulsory internship. Admissions are based on the National Eligibility cum Entrance Test (NEET-UG), conducted by the National Testing Agency (NTA).

== Infrastructure ==
IIMSR spans 25.2 acres and features a 700-bed teaching hospital that provides healthcare services and practical training for students, along with modern classrooms, laboratories, and lecture halls equipped with advanced technology. It includes separate hostels for male and female students, accommodations for nursing staff, and facilities such as a library, gymnasium, cafeteria, and sports grounds to support student well-being and extracurricular activities. The campus also offers a serene and landscaped environment conducive to learning and research.

IIMSR is equipped with a biometric attendance system mandated by the National Medical Commission (NMC). This system, designed and hosted by the National Informatics Centre (NIC), ensures efficient and accurate attendance monitoring for faculty and staff, aligning with government standards.

== Challenges and Progress ==
IIMSR faced challenges along with other rural medical institutions in Maharashtra due to shortcomings in meeting the National Medical Commission (NMC) standards. Issues such as inadequate infrastructure, lack of clean drinking water, and insufficient facilities were cited as primary reasons for rejection of several proposals for new medical colleges in the region. Despite these challenges, the state government has committed to addressing these deficiencies, including improving infrastructure and recruiting qualified staff, to ensure compliance with NMC's essential standards.

For the academic year 2024-25, the NMC approved the renewal of 150 MBBS seats for IIMSR. Additionally, the government has initiated efforts to transfer faculty from established colleges to institutions in rural areas like Jalna, ensuring adequate staffing and educational standards. These steps aim to enhance the quality of medical education and provide better healthcare facilities to underserved regions.
