= University of Solapur =

Public university in Maharashtra, India

Punyashlok Ahilyadevi Holkar Solapur University
- Other name: Solapur University
- Motto: Vidyaya Sampannata
- Type: Public
- Established: 2004 (22 years ago)
- Affiliations: UGC
- Chancellor: Governor of Maharashtra
- Vice-Chancellor: Dr. Mrunalini Milind Fadnavis
- Location: Solapur, Maharashtra, India; 17°43′24″N 75°50′30″E
- Campus: Urban
- Website: http://su.digitaluniversity.ac/

Punyashlok Ahilyadevi Holkar Solapur University is a state university located in Solapur, Maharashtra, India. It was formerly the postgraduate centre of Shivaji University.

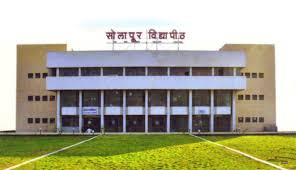
Front view of Solapur University

== Affiliated colleges ==
Its jurisdiction extends over Solapur.

== Academic departments ==
Departments/Schools in the University.

- School of Chemical Sciences
- School of Computational Sciences
- School of Earth Science
- School of Physical Sciences
- School of Social Science
- School of Education
- School of Commerce and Management

== Vice-chancellors & acting vice-chancellors ==
List of Vice-Chancellors of Punyashlok Ahilyadevi Holkar Solapur University.

- I. S. Swami (Vice Chancellor) (2004–2007)
- N. N. Maldar (Acting Vice Chancellor) (Sept 2007 – Nov 2007)
- B. P. Bandgar (Vice Chancellor) (2007–2012)
- N. J. Pawar (Acting Vice Chancellor) (Nov 2012 – Dec 2012)
- N. N. Maldar (Vice Chancellor) (2012–2017)
- Nitin Karmalkar (Acting Vice Chancellor) (Dec 2017 – May 2018)
- M. M. Fadnavis ( Vice Chancellor ) (May 2018 to till date)
- Prakash Mahanwar (Vice Chancellor ) (06 th October 2023 to till date)

== See also ==
- List of higher education institutions in Maharashtra
