= Hinduhridaysamrat Balasaheb Thackeray Medical College and Dr. R. N. Cooper Municipal General Hospital =

Hospital in Mumbai, India

Hinduhridaysamrat Balasaheb Thackeray Medical College and Dr. Rustom Narsi Cooper Municipal General Hospital
- Type: Public
- Established: 1970; 56 years ago, as Hospital; 2015; 11 years ago, Medical College
- Affiliations: Maharashtra University of Health Sciences
- Dean: Dr. Chhaya A. Shinde
- Location: Vile Parle West, Juhu, Mumbai, Maharashtra, India; 19.107838°N 72.836230°E
- Website: hbtmc.edu.in

The Hinduhridaysamrat Balasaheb Thackeray Medical College, also known as HBT Medical College, is a public medical college located in Juhu, Mumbai, India. It is owned and operated by the Brihanmumbai Municipal Corporation. The medical college is attached with Dr. R.N. Cooper Municipal General Hospital.

This is one of the five government medical colleges in the city of Mumbai, out of which four (GSMC, LTMMC, TNMC & HBTMC) come under jurisdiction of Brihanmumbai Municipal Corporation, and GGMC comes under the jurisdiction of the Government of Maharashtra. Being one of the five government medical colleges in the city of Mumbai, HBTMC requires UG and PG students to have a very high score in NEET UG & NEET PG.

It was started in 1969 as a maternity home before it was converted into a full-fledged general hospital in 1970. The hospital underwent massive reconstruction after the original building was declared unfit for use in 1999. The first building was created that still stands in the compound that held a 5 story hospital with all new equipment and staff. In 2013, the entire area of the hospital (300+ acres) was converted into the new hospital complex with the leverage of advancement in technology and medicine. The new upgrade, at a cost of ₹321 crore, includes more beds, as well as systems for rainwater harvesting and sewage treatment. The new hospital design includes an infection control design to prevent doctors from contracting tuberculosis while on duty.

In 2020, a students' led research wing titled Guidance, Education, Networking, and Empowerment-based Smart Initiative for Students research in health care (GENESIS) was established with the strong support from faculty and alumni. This is considered to be 'one of its kind' in India.

== Departments ==
The hospital/college has the following departments:

1. Anaesthesiology
2. Anatomy
3. Biochemistry
4. Community Medicine
5. Dentistry & Maxillofacial surgery
6. Dermatology & Venereology
7. Forensic Medicine
8. General Surgery
9. Internal Medicine
10. Microbiology
11. Neurosurgery
12. Obstetrics and gynaecology
13. Ophthalmology
14. Orthopaedics
15. Otorhinolaryngology
16. Paediatrics
17. Pathology
18. Pharmacology
19. Physiology
20. Physiotherapy & Occupational Therapy
21. Psychiatry
22. Pulmonary Medicine
23. Radiology

== Incidents ==
There were protests at the hospital after a patient attacked a nurse in April 2020.
