= Dr. Babasaheb Ambedkar Technological University =

University in Maharashtra, India

- Motto in English: Development through Technology
- Type: Public
- Established: 1989 (37 years ago)
- Affiliations: UGC, AIU
- Chancellor: Governor of Maharashtra
- Vice-Chancellor: Karbhari V. Kale
- Administrative staff: 146
- Students: 4000
- Undergraduates: 2322
- Postgraduates: 252
- Location: Vidyavihar, Lonere, Raigad district, Maharashtra, India; 18.168423°N 73.335607°E
- Campus: Rural, 525 acres
- Website: www.dbatu.ac.in

Dr. Babasaheb Ambedkar Technological University (DBATU) is a unitary, Maharashtra state Technological University in Lonere, Maharashtra, India. It is named after Babasaheb Ambedkar, a prominent Indian jurist, economist, politician and social reformer.

== History ==
It was established by in 1989 under the Government of Maharashtra Act 1983. It is a statutory State Technical University and was established by the Government of Maharashtra through the Dr. Babasaheb Ambedkar Technological University Act.

- The university was accorded the status of an ‘affiliating’ university of the entire State of Maharashtra' from 2 March 2016, by Maharashtra Act No. XXIX of 2014.

== Campus ==
The campus covers 1,000 acres (4,000,000 m^{2}) in the village of Lonere. It is approximately 20 km north of Mahad city and 10 km south of Mangaon tehsil. The campus is near the industrial belt comprising Thane, Belapur, Nagothane, Patalganga, Roha and Mahad.

== Academics ==
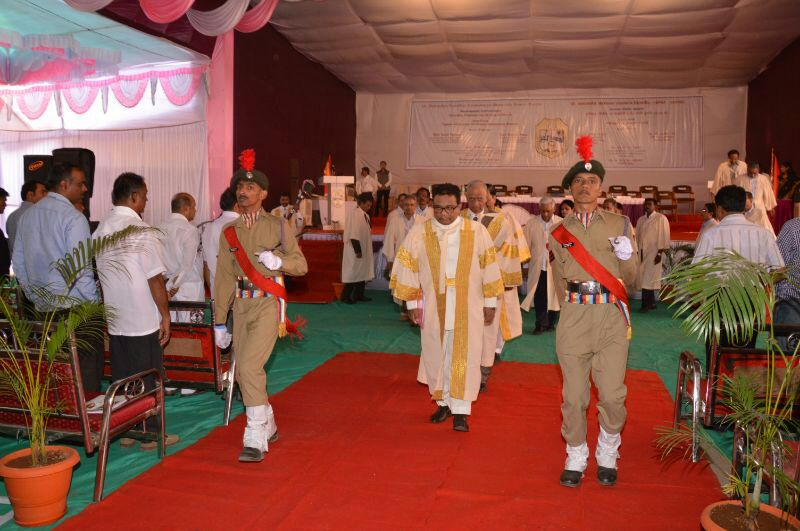
Vice-Chancellor R. B. Mankar at the 17th Convocation in 2014.

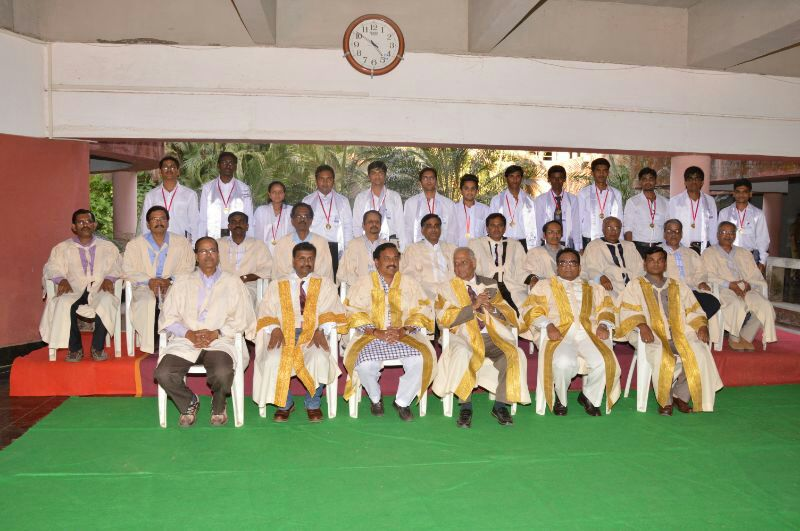
Gold Medal for Exceptional Merit at the 17th Convocation.

DBATU is unitary and features undergraduate and postgraduate programs in core engineering disciplines. It offers four-year Bachelor of Technology (B. Tech.) degrees in the departments like civil, mechanical, electrical, electronics and telecommunication, chemical, petrochemical, computer science and information technology.

It offers two-year Master of Technology (M. Tech.) degrees in Power Systems, chemical, computer, electronics and telecommunication, environmental, manufacturing and in thermal and fluids engineering.

The university offers diploma courses on its Institute of Petrochemical Engineering (IOPE) campus.

== Student activities ==
- CynoSure: Annual technical festival, presenting technical events, presentations, workshops, lectures, etc.
- ChemFraternity: Department of Chemical Engineering organises a national-level chemical engineering technical festival. Competitions and events are conducted and students from other colleges participate.
- Annual Gathering: 2-3 day annual festival. It includes sections such as one act, group act, solo dance, group dance, solo and duet singing and poetry with prizes.
- A TEDxDBATU was first organised on 15 October 2016. Speakers including Padma Shri Sharad P. Kale and Anil Joshi delivered talks. TEDx DBATUSalon was the first and only midnight event at DBATU.
- ACES Week: The Association of Computer Engineering Student is organized by the Computer department and Computer engineering students in DBATU. Students from other departments can participate. It includes technical and other events such as poetry reading, storytelling, singing, C code competition, Hackathon, LAN Gaming events like CS Go, LUDO, LUDO king, PUBG. Flash mob and photography competition is there.

=== Entrepreneurship and leadership ===
Students developed a United Cell for Entrepreneurship and Leadership (UCEL) for students and alumnae in 2016. Later, after official affiliations it was upgraded and became the Institution's Innovation Council for DBATU (IIC x DBATU) along with an i2e Incubation Center. It led to the organization of weekly and monthly micro events.
