= Terna Medical College =

- Type: Medical college and hospital
- Established: 1991
- Affiliations: Maharashtra University of Health Sciences
- Location: Navi Mumbai, Maharashtra, India; 19.039104°N 73.014134°E
- Website: http://www.ternamedical.org/

Terna Medical College is a medical college located in Navi Mumbai, Maharashtra operating under Terna Public Charitable Trust. It has 150 undergraduate seats for MBBS course. It is associated with STRS.
