= Bodhan (Surat) =

Village in Surat, India

Bodhan is a village in the Mandvi taluka in the Surat district of Gujarat, India. It is located 32 km east of the district headquarters, Surat, and 255 km from the state capital, Gandhinagar. Bodhan's pin code is 394140 and the postal head office is Bodhan.

There are two mosques and seven Hindu temples. The main occupation of the villagers is agriculture. There are three schools, two of which are primary schools and the other being a secondary school.

The Tapi River (formerly called Tapati River) runs through the village.
