= Government Medical College, Aurangabad =

Medical college in Maharashtra, India

Government Medical College, Chhatrapati Sambhaji Nagar
- Motto: Selfless service
- Type: Education and research institution
- Established: August 15, 1956; 70 years ago
- Affiliations: Maharashtra University of Health Sciences, NMC
- Dean: Dr. Shivaji B. Sukre
- Undergraduates: 200 per year
- Postgraduates: 203 per year
- Location: Chhatrapati Sambhaji Nagar, Maharashtra, India
- Website: www.gmcaurangabad.com

Government Medical College, Chhatrapati Sambhaji Nagar is a medical school affiliated to the Maharashtra University of Health Sciences (MUHS), Nashik. The College is recognized by the National Medical Commission (NMC), New Delhi for medical education in India. It was founded in 1956. At present, the college accepts 200 students per year for the undergraduate course MBBS and around 203 students per year for the various postgraduate courses.

== Location ==
The college is located on the east bank of Kham river in northwest part of Chhatrapati Sambhajinagar, very close to famous tourist attractions like Panchakki, Bibi Ka Maqbara and Dr. Babasaheb Ambedkar Marathwada University. The college is 4 km away from the Chhatrapati Sambhajinagar railway station,1.5 km away from the central bus stand and 11 km away from the Aurangabad Airport.

== History ==
The college was established on 15 August 1956, on the occasion of the 10th independence day of India. The college was started with 50 undergraduate students in a small Nizam Bungalow in the cantonment area of the city, while infectious, obstetrics & ophthalmology wards were located at Amkhas in the other part of the city. The foundation stone for the present main building of the medical college was laid down by then chief minister of Bombay State, Yashwantrao Chavan, in presence of Swami Ramanand Teerth, on 27 October 1957. The building was inaugurated by Sushila Nayyar, then Minister of Health, Government of India, on 20 June 1964. Various other buildings were added to the campus over a period of time. For initial few batches, after completing the first year in the college students had to go to Government Medical College, Nagpur, to complete their second and final year of MBBS curriculum. From its inception till 1963, the college was affiliated to Osmania University, Hyderabad. After 1963, it was affiliated to the newly formed Marathwada University (now Dr. Babasaheb Ambedkar Marathwada University) located at Aurangabad.

The admission strength of college was subsequently increased to 100 undergraduate students per year and now it is allowed to take 200 MBBS students per year. Similarly, post graduation seats were added to various departments of the college; the current intake capacity is 127 post graduate students per year. The college & hospital complex now consists agglomeration of 30 buildings spread over 99 acres. The hospital of the college started with 300 beds in a small Nizam Bungalow in 1960 is now equipped with 1170 beds distributed across various departments and wards.

The college has been providing medicinal services to the people of Marathwada region and surrounding districts of Vidarbha and Khandesh regions round the clock for the last 57 years.

=== Past Principals of the Institute ===
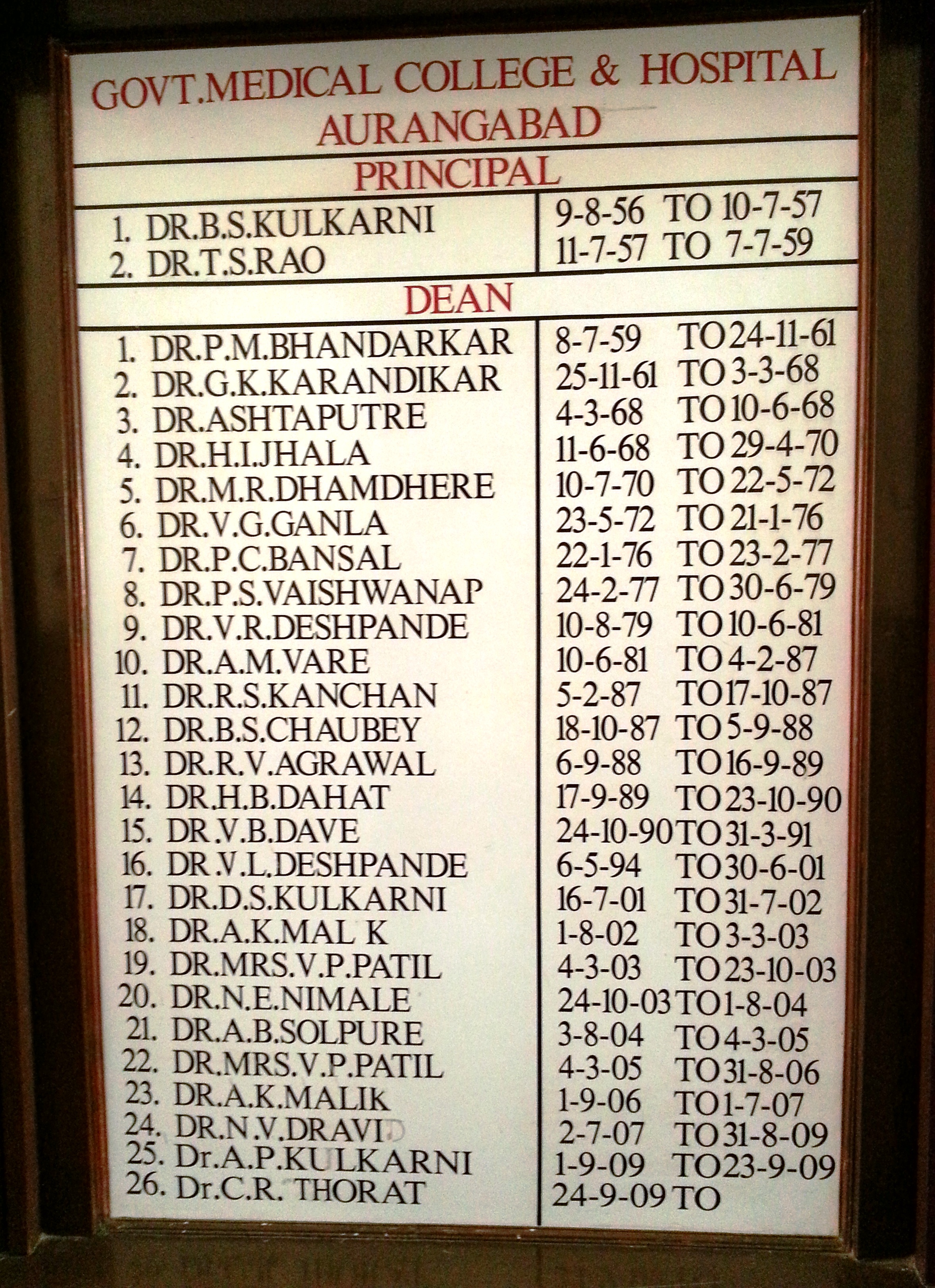
List of GMC Aurangabad's Deans displayed in front of Dean's Office at GMC main building

Sl. No	Name	Start date of term	End date of term
1	Dr. B.S. Kulkarni	9 August 1956	10 July 1957
2	Dr. T.S. Rao	11 July 1957	7 July 1959

=== Past Deans of the Institute ===
Sl. No	Name	Start date of term	End date of term
1	Dr. P. M. Bhandarkar	8 July 1959	24 November 1961
2	Dr. G. K. Karandikar	25 November 1961	3 March 1968
3	Dr. Ashthaputre	4 March 1968	10 June 1968
4	Dr. H. I. Jhala	11 June 1968	29 April 1970
5	Dr. M. R. Dhamdhere	10 July 1970	22 May 1972
6	Dr. V. G. Ganla	23 May 1972	21 January 1976
7	Dr. P. C. Bansal	22 January 1976	23 February 1977
8	Dr. P. S. Vaishwanap	24 February 1977	30 June 1979
9	Dr. V. R. Deshpande	10 August 1979	10 June 1981
10	Dr. A. M. Vare	10 June 1981	4 February 1987
11	Dr. R. S. Kanchan	5 February 1987	17 October 1987
12	Dr. B. S. Chaubey	18 October 1987	5 September 1988
13	Dr. R. V. Agrawal	6 September 1988	16 September 1989
14	Dr. H. B. Dahat	17 September 1989	23 October 1990
15	Dr. V. B. Dave	24 October 1990	31 March 1991
16	Dr. V. L. Deshpande	6 May 1994	30 June 2001
17	Dr. D. S. Kulkarni	16 July 2001	31 July 2002
18	Dr. A. K. Malik	1 August 2002	3 March 2003
19	Dr. V. P. Patil	4 March 2003	23 October 2003
20	Dr. N. E. Nimale	24 October 2003	1 August 2004
21	Dr. A. B. Solpure	3 August 2004	4 March 2005
(19)	Dr. V. P. Patil	4 March 2005	31 August 2006
(18)	Dr. A.K. Malik	1 September 2006	1 July 2007
22	Dr. N. V. Dravid	2 July 2007	31 August 2009
23	Dr. A. P. Kulkarni	1 September 2009	23 September 2009
24	Dr. C. R. Thorat	24 September 2009	31 July 2011
25	Dr. K. S. Bhople	2 May 2011	30 Nov 2014
26	Dr. C. B. Mhaske	1 August 2015	2018
27	Dr. K. A. Yelikar	2018	Incumbent

== Academics ==
The courses offered by the institute are:

- M.B.B.S. (Annual intake of 200 students)
- M.D./M.S.
- B.Sc. in Nursing (Annual intake of 50 students)
- Diploma Course in Medical Laboratory Technology (DMLT)
- Bachelor of Para medical Technology (BPMT)

== Admissions ==
=== Undergraduate courses ===
The GMC, Aurangabad accepts 200 students every year for MBBS course. The admission is based on merit in the National Eligibility cum Entrance Test.

The college has 120 BPMT student intake. The BPMT course is for the posts of lab technician, radiology technician, radiotherapy technician, community and medicine technician etc.

=== Post-graduate courses ===
The post-graduate students in various courses of medicine and surgery get admitted to GMC through all India and Maharashtra state level post-graduate medical entrance examinations.

== Medical services ==
The special facilities available at GMCH, Aurangabad include Intensive Care Unit (ICU), Intensive Coronary Care Unit (ICCU), Medicine Intensive Care Unit (MICU), Neonatal Intensive Care Unit (NICU), Paediatric Intensive Care Unit (PICU), CT scan, MRI and a blood bank amongst other facilities. It is backed up by Central & Departmental Laboratories for all the investigations round the clock.

To provide a quality healthcare for people in rural area, the Preventive and Social Medicine (PSM) department of GMC operates one rural health and training centre at Paithan 50 km from Aurangabad. The PSM department also operates one urban healthcare centre in the Shahganj area of Aurangabad.

=== Speciality care centres at GMCH ===
The super-speciality care centres at GMCH include

- Cardiology and Cardio-thoracic Intensive Care Unit
- Radiotherapy Centre
- Government Cancer Hospital
- Telemedicine Centre

== Research at GMCH ==
Both non-clinical and clinical departments of the GMCH are involved in active research in number of fields. Faculty and students of the GMCH have their research papers published in number of national and international journals.

Sandfly fever, an aroboviral disease is known to occur in the arid regions of West Pakistan and Middle East. Its occurrence in India was thought to be doubtful. However, in 1967, the sandfly fever virus was isolated in Aurangabad from febrile cases.

== Residential facilities ==
The GMC provides residential facility for all its faculty members, staff and students inside the campus. There are two hostels for male undergraduate students (Old and New Boys Hostel), a single hostel for female undergraduate students and a separate hostel for Nursing students. Post-graduate students have a separate residential block. The quarters for nursing and other staff are also located inside the campus.

== Campus ==
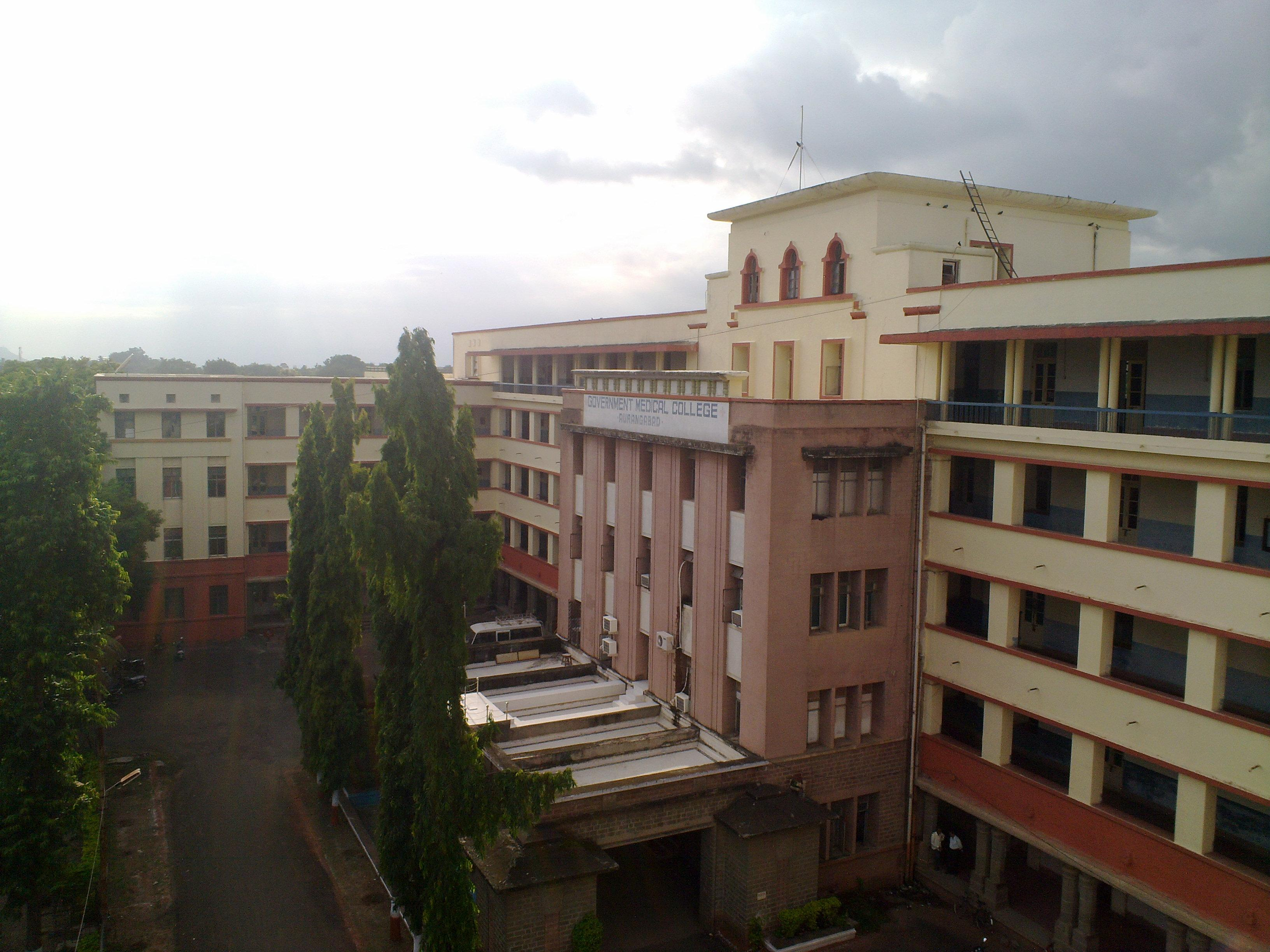
GMC Main Building

- College & hospital buildings: The GMCH is spread over 40 hectare (99 acres) of land. The main administrative and teaching building of college is a four story tall building; built in colonial style with red stones, stone pillars and broad doorways. The main building contains various offices on ground floor, Dean's office on first floor, number of lecture theaters, anatomy museum, pathology museum, PSM museum, canteen and an auditorium with seating capacity of 800. The other buildings in campus include Out Patient Block (OPD), Surgical and OBGY wards block, Medicine wards and Super-Speciality (Cardiology & CVTS) unit. Government Dental College which offers BDS degree is also located in the same premises.
- Library and Reading rooms: The College has a library with a good collection of medical text books, national and international journals of different faculties and various other referral books. Two separate reading rooms are available for undergraduate and post graduate students.
- Gymkhana: The College maintains a gymkhana to provide facilities for sports and recreation for students and faculty members inside the campus. The gymkhana includes table tennis court, badminton court and volleyball court.

== See also ==
- Medical College (India)
- List of medical colleges in India
- Maharashtra University of Health Sciences
