= Sharad P. Kale =

Indian scientist

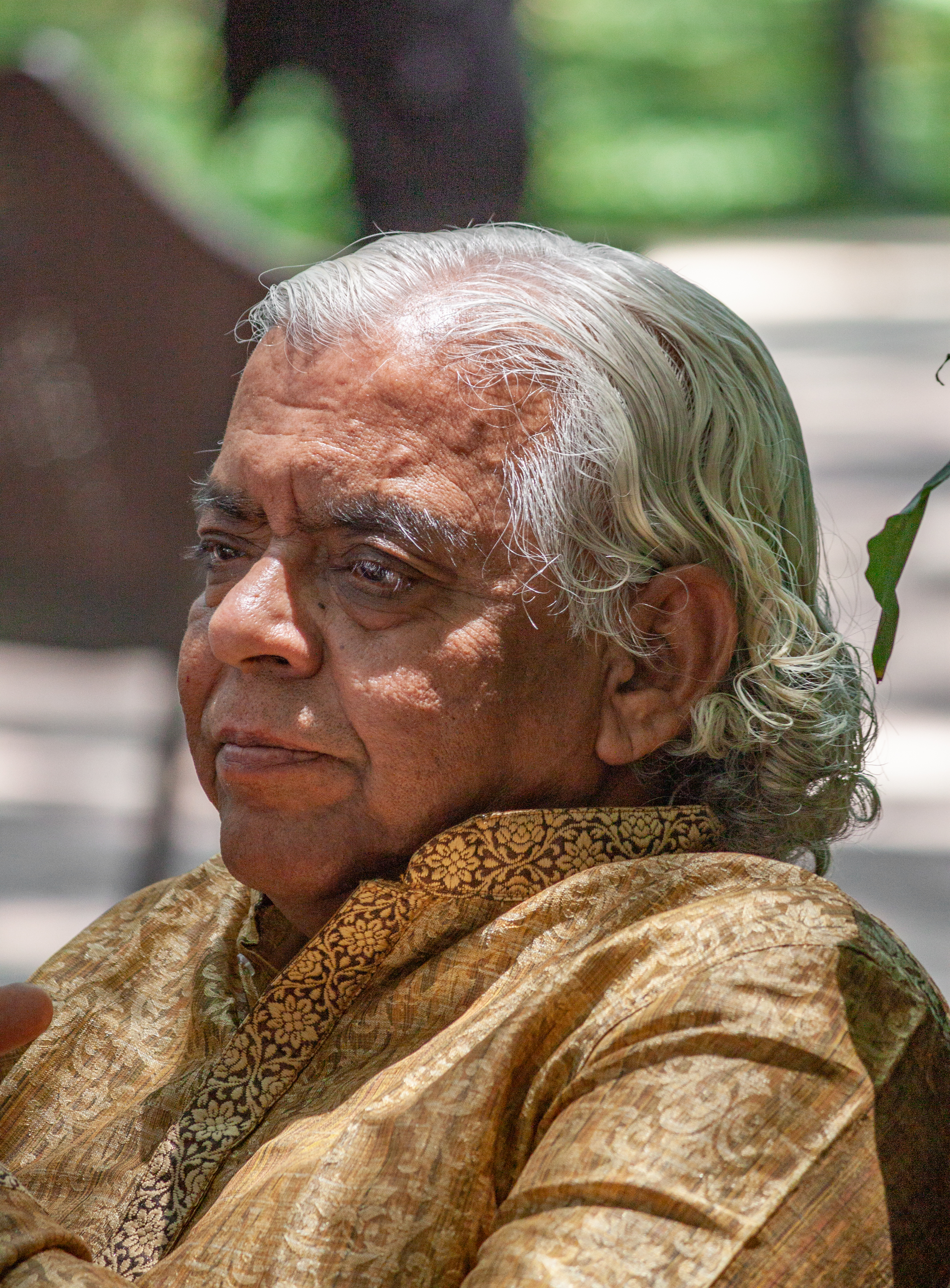
- Kale in 2024
- Occupation: Scientist
- Employer: Bhabha Atomic Research Centre
- Known for: Environmental activism
- Honours: Padma Shri

Sharad P Kale is a scientist known for developing a biogas plant based on biodegradable waste resource (Nisargruna). He is the head of Technology Transfer and Collaboration at Bhabha Atomic Research Centre (BARC). On 26 January 2013, the Government of India honoured him with the Padma Shri Award in the Discipline of Science and Engineering.

== Nisargruna ==
Nisargruna is a biogas technology that uses biodegradable waste as an input and produces biogas as an output. The Nisargruna plant can process a variety of biodegradable wastes such as kitchen waste, grass, gobar (animal dung), dry leaves, animal carcasses, effluent sludge from textile manufacture, etc.

The Nisargruna process is unique as it uses a combination of aerobic and anaerobic processes. In the first phase the biodegradable input (also called feedstock) is mixed with recycled water to form a slurry. This slurry enters a pre-digester tank where it undergoes an exothermic reaction that increases its temperature. In the second phase, this mixture enters the anaerobic digestion (AD) tank where methanogenesis takes place and methane (CH_{4}) and carbon dioxide (CO_{2}) are formed.

While traditional AD plants yield a biogas with methane content of 55–65%, the Nisargruna plant with its two-phase process yields a biogas with methane content of 70–80%. The higher concentration of methane in the biogas means that it is a higher grade fuel.

In addition to generating biogas, which may be used as a cooking or heating fuel, the Nisargruna plant also produces a weedless organic manure slurry. This slurry has a C:N (carbon to nitrogen) ratio of 12:1 to 16:1 and is a good organic soil conditioner.

An independent study of a 0.5 TPD (tonnes per day) capacity Nisargruna plant conducted in 2015 showed that the plant had a payback period of less than three years.

The Technology Transfer and Collaboration Department at BARC owns the intellectual property for the Nisargruna plant and has licensed it to over 50 companies (As of September 2015) that may deploy it for their customers.
