= Tadkeshwar =

Village in Gujarat, India

- village
- Country: India
- State: Gujarat
- District: Surat

Languages
  - Official: Gujarati, Hindi
- Time zone: UTC+5:30 (IST)
- Vehicle registration: GJ-
- Website: www.tadkeshwar.webs.com

Tarkeshwar also spelt "Tadkeshwar", is a town located in the Surat district, Gujarat, India, situated approximately 36 km (22 mi) away from Surat and on the Kim-Mandvi Road north of the Tapti River. It belongs to the Mandvi Taluka of Surat Panchayat. It has a population of about 15,000 people, with a majority of Sunni Gujarati Muslims and the remainder being Hindus of various castes. Most of the families are engaged in agriculture.

== History ==
The town was previously a Rajput town called Bhim-Nagar derived from the name of Raja Bhima I of the Chaulukya dynasty, who ruled most of Gujarat at the time. During Sultan Mahmud of Ghazni's invasions into Gujarat, the town was both attacked and conquered by his armies, sometime between the years 1024-1026AD. Thirty-five thousand Ghaznavid soldiers are said to have conquered the town. This is attested by the fact that old stones can be found around the town with the name of the conqueror Sultan Mahmud Ghaznavi engraved on them. Since Sultan Mahmud of Ghazni was himself of Turkic origin and his armies consisted of Turks, Persians and Afghans from Afghanistan/Afghan Turkestan after the conquest the town became known as Turk-sar, which in the Turkic language means 'beset by the Turks'. Over time, the words combined to form "Tarkeshwar". Most of the town's original Hindu population were killed Some Rajputs in the town are said to have converted to Islam. Some of his soldiers settled in the town and over time adopted the use of Rajput surnames or titles.

The town has a subsequent history of foreign and local settlements including Parsis, Nakhudas and Pashtuns. Four mausoleums dedicated to Muslim saints surround the town at all four directions, and are said to give the town divine blessing. Two of the more famous saints are Maulana Nizamuddin Bajouri, an Afghan Pashtun from Bajour, who lived and died in Tadkeshwar in the 19th century; and his disciple Shaikh Moosaji Mehtar. Their graves are located together on a hill.

Today, the majority of Tadkeshwar is populated by Muslims, and about 20% are Hindus.

== Places ==
Tadkeshwar has a large and very old madrasa Darul uloom Falah-e-Darain, where hundreds of Muslim students from far afield as Sudan and Srinagar in India go to become ulama (alim) and qurrāʾ. The old mosque also contains an inscription in Persian language.

The town has its own water works system and electricity and telephone networks are provided to the whole town. The town also has its own bazaar, high school, three hospitals and two graveyards with many old stones.

Tadkeshwar also has two lignite mines and a canal. These mines were once rain forest which has large number of amber encased fossils. In 2014, 52 million-year-old amber encased fossil of a termite which thrived in ant colonies was discovered from lignite mines. It was the oldest known fossil of myrmecophily.

The mausoleums of two saints Maulana Nizamuddin Bajouri, and Shaikh Moosaji Mehtar are also located in the village.

The closest railhead is Kim.

== See also ==
- Muslim conquests in the Indian subcontinent
- Ghaznavid Empire
- List of tourist attractions in Surat
