= Maharashtra University of Health Sciences =

Higher education institute in Nashik, India

- Type: Public Medical University
- Established: 3 June 1998 (28 years ago)
- Affiliations: UGC
- Chancellor: Governor of Maharashtra
- Vice-Chancellor: Dr. Venkat Shahubai Arjunrao Gite
- Location: Nashik, Maharashtra, India
- Website: muhs.ac.in

Maharashtra University of Health Sciences (MUHS) is a higher Medical education institution in Nashik, Maharashtra, India.

== History ==
The university was established on 3 June 1998 by the state Government of Maharashtra through an ordinance. The State Legislature passed the ordinance and the Maharashtra University of Health Sciences was declared open by the governor of Maharashtra on 10 June 1998. All colleges and institutions imparting education in health science in the state of Maharashtra have been affiliated to this new university under Section 6(3) of the Act.

== Academics ==
Postgraduate courses awarded are versatile including Doctor of Medicine (M.D.) in various areas, Master of Surgery (M.S.), as well as Master of Science (M.Sc.) courses and other PG diplomas.

== Vice Chancellors ==
1. Dr. Dayanand G. Dongaonkar
2. Dr. Dilip G. R. Mhaisekar
3. Lt. Gen. (Dr.) Madhuri Kanitkar
4. Dr. Ajay Chandanwale
5. Sanjeev Sonawane (additional charge)
6. Dr. V. S. Arjunrao Gite (present)

Dr. Rajendra Bangal, Registrar

== Affiliated medical colleges ==
=== Bachelor of Medicine Bachelor of Surgery (MBBS) ===
Medical colleges affiliated with the university, as of July 2019:

1. Government Medical College, Gadchiroli
2. Grant Medical College, Mumbai
3. Hinduhridaysamrat Balasaheb Thackeray Medical College and Dr. R. N. Cooper Municipal General Hospital, Juhu
4. Lokmanya Tilak Municipal Medical College and General Hospital, Sion, Mumbai
5. Seth G.S. Medical College and King Edward Memorial Hospital, Mumbai
6. Topiwala National Medical College and B.Y.L. Nair Charitable Hospital, Mumbai, Mumbai
7. Armed Forces Medical College, Pune
8. Shri Bhausaheb Hire Government Medical College, Dhule
9. ACPM Medical College, Dhule
10. B. J. Government Medical College, Pune
11. Dr. Shankarrao Chavan Government Medical College, Nanded
12. Dr. V. M. Government Medical College, Solapur
13. Ashwini Rural Medical College, Solapur
14. Dr. Ulhas Patil Medical College and Hospital, Jalgaon
15. Dr. Panjabrao Deshmukh Memorial Medical College, Amravati
16. Government Medical College, Akola
17. Government Medical College, Chhatrapati Sambhajinagar
18. Government Medical College, Baramati
19. K.M.S.K. Government Medical College, Chandrapur
20. Government Medical College, Jalgaon
21. Government Medical College, Latur District
22. Government Medical College, Miraj, Sangli
23. Government Medical College and Hospital, Nagpur
24. Indira Gandhi Government Medical College, Nagpur
25. K J Somaiya medical college, Mumbai
26. Indian Institute of Medical Science and Research, Jalna
27. Government Medical College, Gondia
28. MIMER Medical College, Talegaon Dabhade
29. Maharashtra Institute of Medical Science and Research, Latur
30. Mahatma Gandhi Institute of Medical Sciences, Wardha
31. Dr. Vasantrao Pawar Medical College Hospital and Research Center, Nashik
32. N.K.P. Salve Institute of Medical Sciences, Nagpur
33. Rajiv Gandhi Medical College, Kalwa, Thane
34. Jawaharlal Nehru Medical College, Wardha
35. R.C.S.M. Govt Medical College and CPR Hospital, Kolhapur
36. Shri Vasantrao Naik Government Medical College, Yavatmal
37. Smt. Kashibai Navale Medical College, Pune
38. Swami Ramanand Teerth Rural Medical College, Beed District
39. Terna Medical College, Navi Mumbai
40. B.K.L. Walawalkar Rural Medical College, Sawarde, Ratnagiri
41. Prakash Institute of Medical Sciences and Research, Urun-Islampur, Sangli
42. Vedantaa Institute Of Medical Sciences, Dahanu
43. Bharatratna Atal Bihari Vajpayee Medical College, Pune
44. S.M.B.T Institute of Medical Science and Research Centre, Nashik
45. D.V.V.P.’s Medical College, A’nagar
