= National Fire Service College =

Firefighting academy in India

The National Fire Service College, Nagpur
- Abbreviation: NFSC
- Formation: 1956
- Type: Government
- Legal status: Active
- Purpose: Provider of training in fire safety and firefighting
- Location: Takli Feeder Road, Raj Nagar, Nagpur, Maharashtra
- Region served: India
- Director: N. B. Shingane
- Executive director and professor: Dr. A. R. Sontake
- Parent organization: Ministry of Home Affairs, Government of India
- Affiliations: Rashtrasant Tukadoji Maharaj Nagpur University
- Website: nfscnagpur.nic.in

The National Fire Service College, Nagpur (NFSC) is a training institute under the Ministry of Home Affairs, Government of India, responsible to train fire officers in fire science, safety and firefighting.

== History ==
The first Fire Service College in India was established in Rampur, Uttar Pradesh, in 1956 as the National Fire Service College and was relocated to its current location in Nagpur in 1957. NFSC provides a four-year Bachelor of Technology (B.Tech.) degree in Fire Engineering, till 2023 Batch it provided Bachelor of Engineering (B.E. Fire) degree. It also provide in-service training programs for Central and State Government personnel.

In March 2024, Dr. A. R. Sontake was appointed as the executive director and professor at NFSC.

== Curriculum and training ==
The curriculum is based on guidelines from Rashtrasant Tukadoji Maharaj Nagpur University (RTMNU) and the All India Council for Technical Education (AICTE). It covers physical training, practical experiments, demonstrations, exercises, and drills.

== See also ==
- List of fire departments in India
- Fire Service Training Institute
