= Government Medical College, Miraj =

Education organisation in Sangli, India

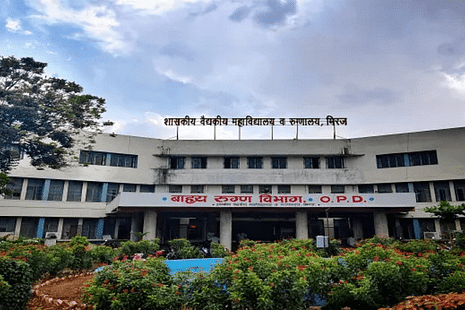
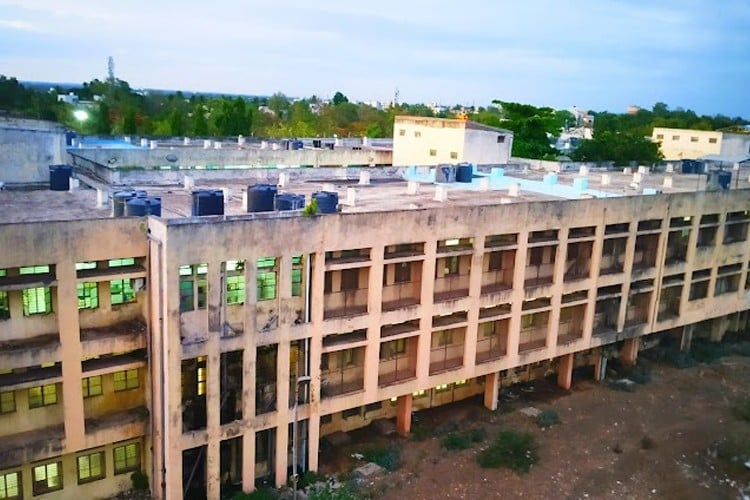
- Other name: Miraj Civil Hospital
- Former name: Miraj Medical College
- Motto: सर्वे सन्तु निरामयाः
- Motto in English: "May all beings be free from illness"
- Type: Medical college and hospital
- Established: 1962; 64 years ago
- Founder: Shri. Vasantdada Patil
- Affiliations: Maharashtra University of Health Sciences, National Medical Commission
- Dean: Dr. Prakash Dattatray Gurav
- Undergraduates: 200 per year
- Postgraduates: 47 per year
- Location: Sangli, Maharashtra, Miraj Sangli, Maharashtra, India
- Campus: 34.3 acres; Urban
- Website: https://www.gmcmiraj.edu.in/
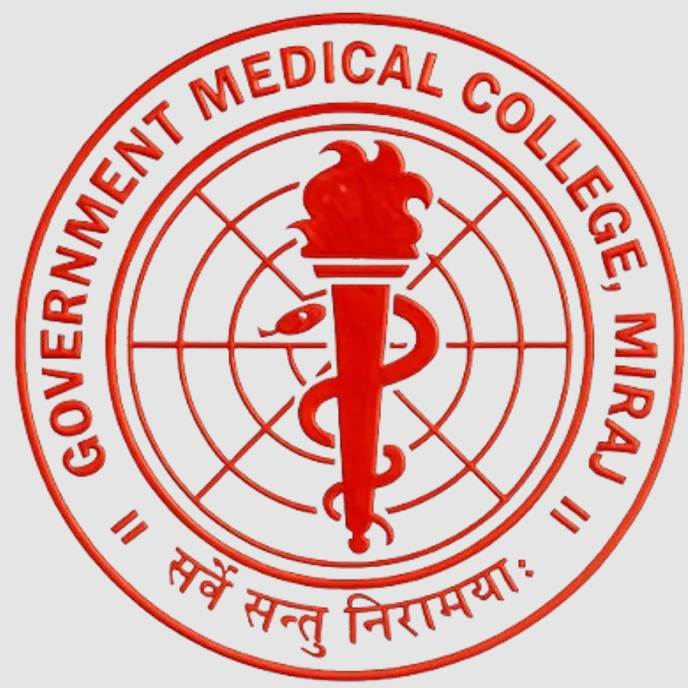

The Government Medical College, Miraj or GMC Miraj is a medical school located in Sangli, Maharashtra, India. It is affiliated to the Maharashtra University of Health Sciences and recognized by National Medical Commission. Established in 1962, it is one of the oldest medical colleges in India.

It has two hospitals attached to it, namely Miraj Civil Hospital and Sangli District Civil Hospital.

== Academic ==
It has 200 undergraduate seats for MBBS course. It has total 47 seats for postgraduation courses.

== Departments ==
=== Clinical ===
1. Medicine
2. Psychiatry
3. Surgery
4. Orthopedics
5. Obstetrics & Gynecology
6. Ophthalmology
7. Anaesthesia
8. Radiology
9. Otorhinolaryngology
10. Pediatric
11. Chest And TB
12. Dentistry
13. Dermatology
14. Emergency Medicine

=== Para-Clinical ===
1. Pathology
2. Microbiology
3. Pharmacology
4. Forensic medicine and toxicology
5. Community medicine
6. Immunohaematology and blood transfusion
7. Nursing

=== Pre-Clinical ===
1. Anatomy
2. Biochemistry
3. Physiology

== Facilities ==
1. E-DIGITAL LIBRARY
2. Central Library
3. MRI
4. CT Scan
5. Dialysis Dept.
6. Blood Bank
7. Departmental Store
8. Girls / Boys Hostel
9. Kitchen / Canteen
10. Auditorium
11. Sports Facilities

== History ==
=== Early Medical Care in Miraj ===
Prior to the college's establishment, Miraj had a history of providing quality medical care. The first government hospital in the region was founded in 1864 by Shrimant Patwardhan, with the assistance of Dr. Gopalrao Govindrao Watwe, the first Indian doctor in Miraj. In 1892, Sir William Wanless founded several healthcare institutions in the area, most notably the Wanless Hospital.

=== Founding and Initial Collaboration ===
The concept for a new government medical college was initiated in 1961 under the leadership of Shri Vasantrao Patil, then a Member of the Legislative Assembly (M.L.A.). A Provisional Medical College Committee was formed in Sangli to promote the project. This committee approached Wanless Hospital, a private Christian institution, to serve as the teaching hospital for the proposed government college. This collaboration was a novel approach at the time, establishing a government medical college with a private hospital as its primary teaching facility. The Board of Administration of the Miraj Medical Centre responded positively to the proposal, and in September 1961, the government appointed a committee to formalize the terms of the partnership. The committee, led by Shri Mahav Rajwade, completed its work and submitted a report on April 16, 1962. The government accepted the recommendations and appointed Dr. B. B. Sethana as the college's first principal.

=== Inauguration and Early Years ===
The college was formally inaugurated on July 31, 1962, by Shri Y. B. Chavan, who was then the Defence Minister of India and a strong supporter of the project. The college began with an inaugural class of 30 students, operating out of the former Miraj Christian Medical School buildings. Initial resources were limited, with equipment sourced from colleges in Poona and Bombay. Residential arrangements were makeshift, with teachers housed in the Government Guest House and students finding accommodation in the town. The foundation stone for the new college building was laid on November 18, 1962, by Dr. S. Radhakrishnan, the President of India. The construction of departments for pre-clinical and para-clinical studies began on a newly acquired plot of land. The departments of Anatomy and Physiology were among the first to be completed and were operational by June 1964.

=== Expansion and Development ===
In June 1963, the college's affiliation was transferred from Poona University to the newly established Shivaji University. A unique aspect of this transition was that the medical college was founded before its parent university. The college's first batch of M.B.B.S. graduates completed their studies and began their internships in 1967. Over the following decades, the college saw significant growth:

* 1964: The number of student admissions was increased to 60.
* 1970: Admissions were raised to 80.
* 1972: The General Hospital, Sangli, became a teaching unit, and postgraduate courses (M.D. and M.S.) were initiated.
* 1975: The admission capacity reached 100 students.
* 1980: The General Hospital, Sangli, was placed under the administrative control of the college's dean.
* 1982: Additional infrastructure, including a gymkhana, ladies' hostel, library, and new boys' hostel, was constructed.

The college also established community-focused centers, including the Rural Health and Training Center in Tasgaon in 1967 and the Urban Health Center in Miraj in 1978. A 200-bed hospital complex on the college campus was approved in 1981 and inaugurated on November 12, 1994, by Shri Sharad Pawar, the Chief Minister of Maharashtra.

=== Modern Era ===
Today, the Government Medical College, Miraj, and its affiliated hospitals serve a large population. The hospital in Miraj has a capacity of 320 beds, while the P.V.P. Government Hospital in Sangli has 380 beds. Both facilities are equipped with clinical, para-clinical departments, and operating complexes. In 2019, the college's admission capacity was further increased from 150 to 200 students, marking another milestone in its history. The college's development from a modest beginning to a comprehensive medical institution reflects its enduring commitment to medical education and public health.

== Notable alumni ==
- Jacob Cherian
- Narendra Dabholkar
- Bharat Patankar activist (co-founder and President) of the left wing of Shramik Mukti Dal and of the peasant movement
