= ACPM Medical College =

Medical college in Dhule, Maharashtra, India

Coordinates: 20°53′57.52″N 74°43′26.75″E

JMF's Late Shri. Annasaheb Chudaman
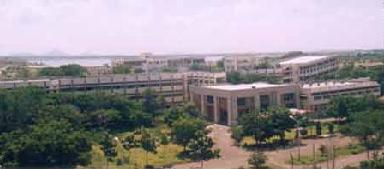
- Type: Medical Education and Research institute
- Established: 1990
- Affiliations: Maharashtra University of Health Sciences
- Dean: Dr Nitin Kulkarni
- Management: Jawahar Medical Foundation
- Administrative staff: 160
- Undergraduates: 100
- Postgraduates: 40
- Location: Dhule, India
- Alumni: 2,000 (approx)
- Website: www.jmfacpm.com

Jawahar Medical Foundation's AC Patil Memorial Medical College, is a medical college in Dhule, Maharashtra affiliated to Maharashtra University of Health Sciences (M.U.H.S., Nashik).

== History ==
The logo of Jawahar Medical Foundation, which governs ACPM Medical College

Jawahar Medical Foundation was the concept of philanthropist, social worker and politician Late. Annasaheb Chudaman Patil. The foundation was registered in 1984. From a small charitable general hospital with only 150 beds, ACPM hospital has grown and now has 500 beds, an Intensive Coronary Care Unit (ICCU), Intensive Care Unit (ICU), Neonatal Intensive Critical Unit (NICU), Paediatric Intensive care Unit (PICU), CT - SCAN and a blood bank amongst other facilities.

== Major milestones ==
The following are the major milestones in the institute's history.

- 1990 Establishment of ACPM Medical college
- 1996 Establishment of JMF'S Nursing Training College
- 1999 Post graduate Diploma course of College of Physicians and Surgeons started in all clinical branches in the medical college.
- 2002 Establishment of ACPM Dental College with 100 seats, recognized by the Dental council of India. It is affiliated to Maharashtra University of Health Sciences, Nashik.
- 2006 Establishment of ACPM College of Physiotherapy and ACPM College of B.Sc. Nursing
- 2007 Post Graduate Courses in the subjects of Medicine, Surgery, Gynaecology, Paediatrics, Pathology and Microbiology started.

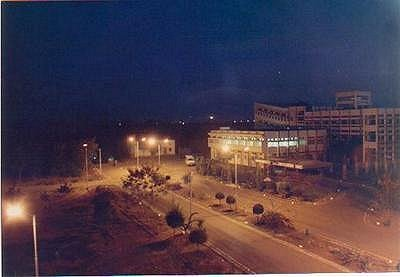
The Campus by Night with the main entrance to the Medical College Complex in the background

== Admission ==
Prior to 2006, the admission to the institute was through the MH-CET. However, currently, the admission to ACPM-MC is via Asso-CET, the entrance exam conducted by the Association of Private Unaided Medical and Dental Colleges. The exam is held each year in April–June.

- As of 2016, the admission process will take place through the NEET exam as per the Supreme Court decision on NEET dated on 9 May 2016.

== Achievements ==
Seri Joseph Abraham of Class of 2001 was the recipient of the ’Dr Suhdakar Sane Gold Medal’ and ’Late Smt Vijayadevi Phadtare Memorial Gold Medal’ in 2008 for securing the highest marks in General Medicine and Medicine of Third MBBS (Part II) amongst all the students of medical colleges affiliated to Maharashtra University of Health Sciences.
