= Central Citrus Research Institute, Nagpur =

Horticulture institute in India

ICAR-Central Citrus Research Institute, Nagpur (NRCC)
- Established: 29 November 1985; 40 years ago
- Focus: Citrus in India
- President: Union Minister of Agriculture and Farmers' Welfare
- Director: Dr. M. S. Ladaniya
- Owner: Indian Council of Agricultural Research
- Address: NRCC, Opp. NBSS& LUP Amravati Road, Nagpur; Pin Code: 440 010
- Location: Amravati Road, Nagpur, Maharashtra, India
- Coordinates: 21°08′48.2″N 79°03′01.2″E
- Interactive map of ICAR-Central Citrus Research Institute, Nagpur (NRCC)
- Website: http://nrccitrus.nic.in
- ^{1} As the NRCC comes under the ICAR whose President is the Minister

The ICAR-Central Citrus Research Institute (previously National Research Centre for Citrus) (Hindi: केन्द्रीय नींबू वर्गीय फल अनुसंधान संस्थान) is an institute for research in citrus fruits and horticulture at Nagpur, Maharashtra. It is located at Nagpur in the state of Maharashtra. The city is famous for mandarin oranges. The centre provides for research in the field of citrus agriculture; it also offers consultancy towards the field. It is a research institute under the Indian Council of Agricultural Research (ICAR) which is an autonomous body under the Ministry of Agriculture of the Indian Government.

== History ==
Central India has appropriate conditions for growing citrus. The city of Nagpur and the region of Vidarbha produces the bulk of India's citrus tonnage, which is the fifth largest producer in the world. In 1980, a task force appointed by the Ministry of Agriculture suggested the need of strengthening of research on citrus in central India after their survey during 24 to 26 April. Dr. D.J. Hutchison, and UNDP consultant on citrus recommended the establishment of Citrus Research Station at Nagpur to investigate problems concerning citrus fruits in the region. The Maharashtra state government also requested the Director General of Indian Council of Agricultural Research for the same. Similarly, quinquennial review team (QRT) of Indian Institute of Horticulture Research (IIHR), Bangalore furthered the recommendation. Consequently, ICAR agreed for the establishment of the Research Station at Nagpur in VIth Plan.

Initially named the Central Citrus Research Station a committee constituted by ICAR selected suitable land at Nagpur and the Government of Maharashtra agreed to provide the 100 hectares of land for the station to be established during VIIth Plan. The foundation stone was laid on 29 July 1985 formally by P.V. Narasimha Rao, the then Minister of Defence. The Centre was functional from 29 November 1985.

The centre started functioned from part of the building of rabbit breeding centre of the Veterinary College at Seminary Hills, Nagpur which was under Dr. PDKV, Akola. Initially, pathology, entomology, horticulture and post-harvest technology laboratories were established.

On 1 April 1986, the status of Central Citrus Research Station which was functioning under IIHR, Bangalore was upgraded to National Research Centre for Citrus with an outlay of Rs.74.00 lakhs in VII Plan. In 1996, the Centre was shifted from the building of rabbit breeding centre of the Veterinary College at Seminary Hills to present site at Amravati Road.

== Mandate ==
The institute was created amidst the so-called 'citrus decline' in India resulting in reduction in the cropped area under citrus. The 2030 Visio document for the institute notes that of the erstwhile undergoing research activities at various universities none was able to contribute to this important region as also that the research was not linked by any framework.

The newly created institute has now been the nodal body of citrus research in India. The National Mission on Citrus and concurrent research activities has allowed a concurrent doubling in yield in Maharashtra.

The initial mandate of the 'station' was limited:

The mandate at the time of establishment of the Centre was to undertake research on mandarin and acid lime to increase the productivity through developing better varieties, standardizing appropriate agrotechniques, integrated pest and disease management and developing technologies for improved storage, packing processing and waste utilization.

== See also ==
- ICAR (Indian Council on Agricultural Research), parent body to this Centre and other Research Centres and Institutes in various fields of agriculture and allied in India
- About Institute
