= R. C. S. M Government Medical College and C. P. R. Hospital =

Medical college and affiliate hospital in Kolhapur, India

Rajarshee Chattrapati Shahu Maharaj Government Medical College and Chhatrapati Pramilatai Raje Hospital
- Motto: Let all be healthy
- Type: Education and research institution, Government Funded
- Established: 2000; 26 years ago
- Affiliations: Maharashtra University of Health Sciences, NMC
- Dean: Dr. Satyawan More
- Faculty: 378
- Undergraduates: 150 per year
- Location: Kolhapur, Maharashtra, India
- Website: rcsmgmc.ac.in

Rajarshee Chattrapati Shahu Maharaj Government Medical College and Chhatrapati Pramilatai Raje Hospital is a medical college and affiliate hospital located in Kolhapur, India. It was founded in the year 2000 and is affiliated to the Maharashtra University of Health Sciences (MUHS), Nashik. The college is recognized by the National Medical Commission (NMC), New Delhi for medical education in India.

== History ==
The hospital was originally built in commemoration of the visit of the Prince of Wales in 1875 and was named King Albert Edward Hospital. Foundation stone was laid by Sir James Fergusson, then the governor of Bombay on 9 March 1881. This was possible with the blessings of the regional ruler Chhatrapati Shahu. This project was completed in 1881. The hospital underwent many changes after Shahu returned from England and offered free treatment to everyone. In 1946 the hospital was renamed to Chhatrapati Pramilatai Raje Hospital in the honour of Chhatrapati Pramilatai Raje, the daughter in law of the royal family of Kolhapur. In the year 2000, the hospital was officially affiliated to the newly established Rajarshee Chhatrapati Shahu Maharaj Government Medical College.

== Campus ==
The medical college and hospital are located in Kolhapur city, Karvir, of Maharashtra. The college is located in the busy city center and caters to the district of Kolhapur and also to the neighboring districts of Ratnagiri, Sindhudurg, Satara and Sangli.

The first MBBS college building is situated in the outskirts of Kolhapur city, in Shenda Park. The campus is relatively large at 40 acres, also has a small lake, named Shenda Lake.

== Academics ==
The medical school provides training to about 600 students in undergraduate and postgraduate medical courses. A nursing school is also maintained by the institution. The hospital has 18 wards with a total of 665 beds and operates with the help of 378 staff and honorary physicians, 6050 nursing staff members and 1566 paramedics.

Funded mainly by the Government of Maharashtra, these institutions renders services virtually free of cost, mostly to the underprivileged sections of the society.

== Admissions ==
=== Undergraduate courses ===
All admissions to the MBBS graduate course is through the National Eligibility Cum Entrance Test (NEET) exam. 15% of total seats are reserved for All-India quota.

=== Postgraduate courses ===
The college currently offers Postgraduate training in medicine, surgery, obstetrics and gynecology, otorhinolaryngology, orthopaedics, anaesthesia and pediatrics under the Diplomate of National Board (DNB) programme conducted by the National Board of Examinations. DNB courses are replaced by MD/MS from the academic year 2021-22. Currently MCI recognised MD/MS courses started under MUHS, Nashik.
