= Huzaifa Vastanvi =

Indian Islamic scholar, writer, and educator

Maulana Huzaifa Vastanvi

2nd Rector of Jamia Islamia Ishaatul Uloom
- Incumbent
- Assumed office 4 May 2025
- Preceded by: Ghulam Mohammad Vastanvi

Personal life
- Born: 1 June 1979 (age 47) Vastan, Gujarat, India
- Parent: Ghulam Mohammad Vastanvi
- Education: Jamia Islamia Ishaatul Uloom
- Occupation: Islamic scholar; educationist; writer
- Relatives: Owais Vastanvi (brother)

Religious life
- Religion: Islam
- Denomination: Sunni
- Jurisprudence: Hanafi
- Creed: Maturidi
- Movement: Deobandi

Huzaifa Vastanvi (born 1 June 1979) is an Indian Islamic scholar, writer, and educator who serves as the Rais al-Jami‘ah (rector) and has long served as the executive director of Jamia Islamia Ishaatul Uloom, Akkalkuwa. He has been actively engaged in Islamic education, institutional leadership, and academic writing. He was appointed rector of the Jamia in May 2025 following the death of his father, Ghulam Mohammad Vastanvi.

== Early life and education ==
Huzaifa Vastanvi was born on 1 June 1979 in Vastan, Surat district, Gujarat. He completed his early and advanced Islamic education at Jamia Islamia Ishaatul Uloom, Akkalkuwa, where he graduated in 2002. He is the son of Ghulam Muhammad Vastanvi, the founder and chairman of the institution.

== Career ==
After graduating in 2002, Huzaifa Vastanvi began teaching at Jamia Islamia Ishaatul Uloom, Akkalkuwa. He later served as Nazim-e-Taleemat (Director of Education) and subsequently as the Executive Director of the institution. In these roles, he played a significant part in implementing both administrative and educational reforms.

Following the death of his father, Ghulam Mohammad Vastanvi, in May 2025, Huzaifa Vastanvi was appointed as the new Rais al-Jami‘ah (head of the institution) by the Jamia’s governing council (Majlis-e-Shura).

Vastanvi has a spiritual association with the Islamic scholar Taqi Usmani and has been involved in promoting his teachings in India. His work also includes efforts in Islamic financial literacy and community welfare programs.

During the COVID-19 lockdown in 2020, Vastanvi assisted in organizing the safe return of stranded students to their homes. He is also involved in interfaith dialogue and initiatives to promote education within marginalized communities.

In 2023, Vastanvi was invited by King Salman of Saudi Arabia for Hajj, acknowledging his contributions to Islamic education and leadership.

In 2024, Vastanvi represented India at the Meeting of BRICS Muslim Religious Leaders, which emphasized promoting peaceful coexistence among religions and fostering global peace.

Vastanvi was also among those who contributed to the establishment of the Burhan Academy.

== Literary works ==
Vastanvi has authored several works, including Safarnama-e-Junubi Africa (Travelogue of South Africa) and Urdu Zaban wa Adab ke Farogh mein Madaris-e-Islamia ki Be-Lauth Khidmat (The Selfless Contributions of Islamic Seminaries to the Promotion of Urdu Language and Literature). He has also written articles on Islamic education and contemporary issues and serves as the editor of the institution’s monthly journal, Shahrah-e-Ilm.

His other works include:

- Tohfa-e-Ramazan (The Gift of Ramadan)
- Islam ki Buniyadi Taleemat se Waqfiyat (Understanding the Basic Teachings of Islam)
- Maqasid-e-Nuzool-e-Quran (The Objectives of the Revelation of the Quran)
- Seerat-un-Nabi (The Biography of the Prophet Muhammad)
- Halaat Hazrat Mahdi aur Alāmāt-e-Qiyāmat (The Circumstances of Mahdi and the Signs of the Day of Judgment)

== See also ==
- List of Deobandis
