= Lonere =

Human settlement in India

Coordinates: 18.16°N 73.32°E

Lonere is a village in Raigad district, Maharashtra, India.

The village is situated on NH-17 (Mumbai-Goa National Highway), approximately 25 km north of Mahad city and 10 km south of Mangaon tehsil. Travelling from Mumbai, the junction at Lonere on NH-17 serves as entry road to the towns of Goregaon, Mhasla, Mandangad, Dapoli, and the seaside resort-towns of Shrivardhan and Harihareshwar.

Lonere is also known for the Dr. Babasaheb Ambedkar Technological University. Established in 1989 under the Government of Maharashtra Act 1983, the university is an Affiliating in nature, and affiliated to the Engineering, Pharmacy, Architecture, HMCT colleges of the Maharashtra state University Grants Commission (India).
