= Akkalkuwa =

- town
- Location in Maharashtra, India
- Coordinates: 21.55°N 74.02°E
- Country: India
- State: Maharashtra
- District: Nandurbarआदिवासी क्षेत्र

Government
  - Type: Gram Panchayat

Population
  - Total: 25,800

Languages
  - Official: Marathi
- Time zone: UTC+5:30 (IST)
- PIN: 425415
- Telephone code: 0091 2567
- Vehicle registration: MH 39
- Nearest city: Taloda
- Sex ratio: 1000:950 ♂/♀
- Literacy: good%
- Climate: hot/ depend on monsoon (Köppen)

Akkalkuwa is a town and the administrative headquarters of Akkalkuwa taluka of Nandurbar district in Maharashtra state. Akkalkuwa lies in Satpuda range of hills, with Narmada River forming northern boundary. Akarni and Taloda talukas lie on the east while southern and western boundaries are occupied by Gujarat state. Because of the hilly terrain with more than fifty percent area falling under forest. This taluka has no Nagarpalika. Big villages are Khapar and Molgi in this taluka. Population of this town is 17,840(2011).
