= Shri Vasantrao Naik Government Medical College =

Medical college and hospital in Yavatmal, India

Government Medical College and Hospital
- Type: Public education and research institution
- Established: 1989
- Affiliations: Maharashtra University of Health Sciences, Nashik
- Dean: G.L Jatkar
- Undergraduates: c. 200 per year
- Location: Yavatmal, Maharashtra, India; 20.3887937°N 78.1204073°E
- Campus: 127 acres (0.5 km^{2})
- Nickname: SVNGMC

Shri Vasantrao Naik Government Medical College (SVNGMC) is a government medical college and hospital in Yavatmal city, in the Vidarbha region of the Maharashtra, India; that provides medical education at undergraduate and postgraduate levels. SVNGMC is named after the former Chief Minister of Maharashtra, late Shri Vasantrao Naik.

Established in 1989, recognized by Medical Council of India, SVNGMC is run by the State Government of Maharashtra, India. It is regulated by the Directorate of Medical Education and Research (DMER), Mumbai and by Maharashtra University of Health Sciences (MUHS), Nashik. The MUHS Nashik college code for SVNGMC Yavatmal is 1507.

== Academics ==
Courses available in SVNGMC

- MBBS
- MD/MS
- CPS Diploma

== Admissions ==
=== Undergraduate ===
Every year a batch of 150 students (now 200) is enrolled for MBBS degree course. Each medical student is uniquely identified with the year and a roll number in the batch. For example, "SVNGMC-2005-99" indicates a student belonging to the 2005 batch with a roll number of 99. After successful completion of the course, which consist of 54 months of active learning and 12 months of training (internship), medical students are awarded MBBS degree.

Students are admitted on the basis of common merit list based on the marks obtained in NEET.

=== Postgraduate ===
SVNGMC has PG courses in various subjects. PG seats are filled through NEET-PG.

== Departments ==
=== Pre-clinical ===
- Department of Anatomy
- Department of Physiology
- Department of Biochemistry

=== Para-clinical ===
- Department of Pathology
- Department of Pharmacology
- Department of Microbiology
- Department of Forensic Medicine & Toxicology
- Department of Preventive & Social Medicine
- Department of Radiology

=== Clinical ===
- Department of Medicine
- Department of General Surgery
- Department of Orthopedics
- Department of Pediatrics
- Department of Obstetrics & Gynecology
- Department of Anaesthesia
- Department of Chest & TB
- Department of Skin & VD
- Department of Ophthalmology
- Department of ENT
- Department of Psychiatry

== Infrastructure Overview ==
- Land area: 5,13,969 square meters
- Out Patient Department (OPD) Complex
- 288 bedded New Hospital Building with 12 well-equipped operation theaters
- 252 bedded Old Civil Hospital Building
- Old Women's Hospital and T.B. Hospital attached to the institution
- Auditorium with 800 seats and balcony, with advanced sound system
- Library with Internet facility
- Dharmshala (a free lodging facility for relatives of patients)
- CT scan, ICCU, Blood Bank, ART (Anti Retroviral Treatment) facilities are available
- Hostels for medical students and resident doctors
