= Ahmed Pura Colony =

Ahmed Pura Colony احمد پورہ کالونی
- Locality
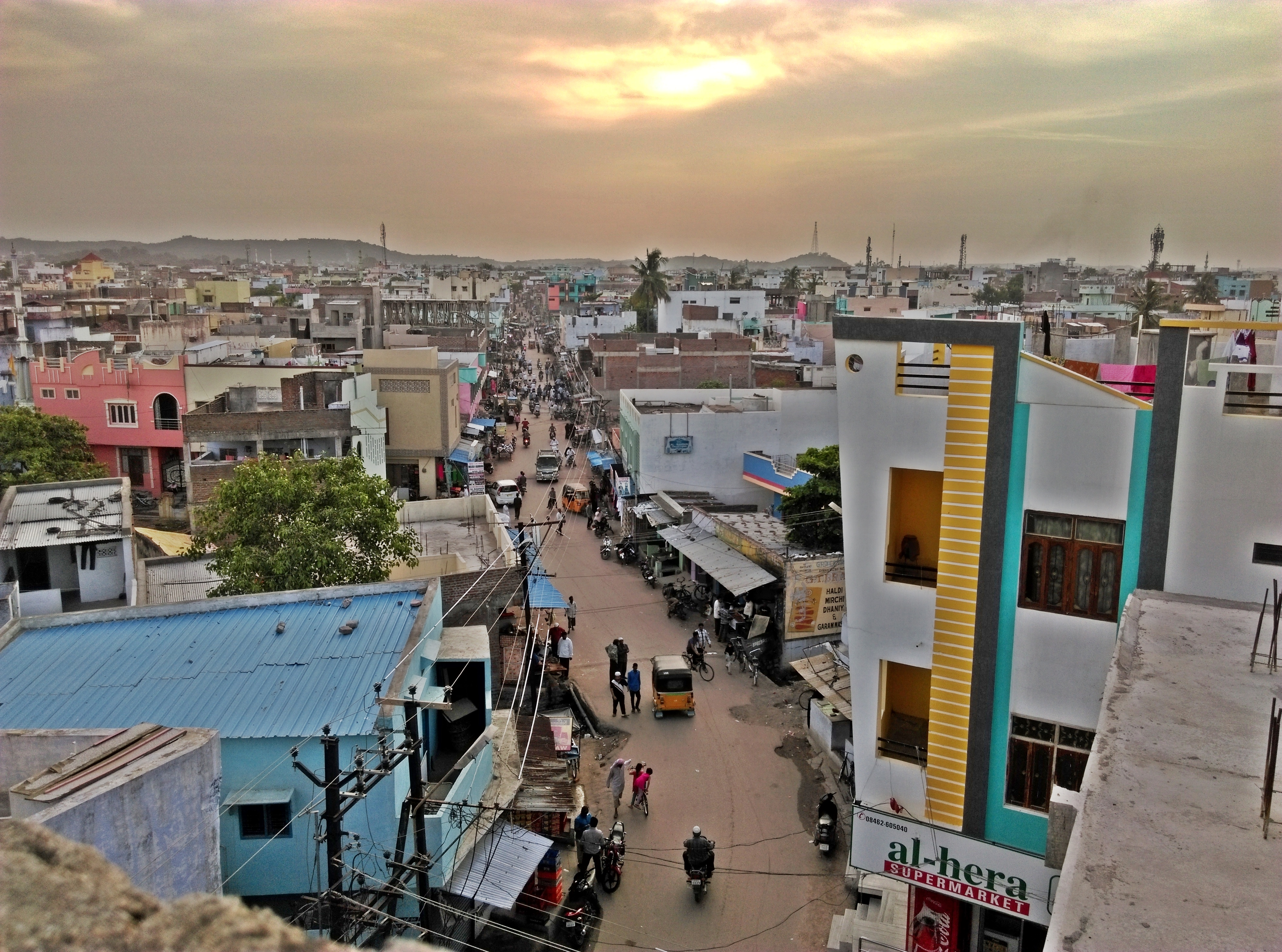
- View of Ahmed Pura
- Interactive map of Ahmed Pura Colony
- Coordinates: 18.6721539°N 78.0874249°E
- Country: India
- State: Telangana
- City: Nizamabad
- Named for: Ahmed

Government
  - Body: Nizamabad Municipal Corporation

Population
  - Total: ~20,000

Languages
  - Official: Urdu
- Time zone: UTC5:30 (IST)
- PIN: 5030 01
- Telephone code: 91-8462

Ahmed Pura Colony is a locality in Nizamabad, in the Indian state of Telangana. It is located at 500 meters from the commercial center Gandhi Chowk. All the residents of this locality are Muslims.

The area is heavily clustered with houses and commercial shops. Ahmed Pura is known for its cloth emporiums and bangle stores.

The nearby localities are Mustaid Pura and Barkat Pura.

== See also ==
- Vijay Rural Engineering College (VREC)
- Nizamabad Railway Station
- Nizamabad Bus Station
