= Shakil Aamir Mohammed =

Indian politician

Member of the Telangana Legislative Assembly
- In office 2 June 2014 – 3 December 2024
- Preceded by: P. Sudarshan Reddy
- Succeeded by: P. Sudarshan Reddy

Personal details
- Born: 7 March 1976 (age 50) Bodhan, Andhra Pradesh (present–day Telangana), India
- Party: Bharat Rashtra Samithi
- Occupation: Politician

Shakil Aamir Mohammed is a two-time legislator hailing from Bharat Rashtra Samithi. He won twice consequently as a member of Telangana Legislative Assembly representing Bodhan Assembly constituency in 2014 and 2018.
