= Gandhi Chowk =

- Interactive map of Gandhi Chowk
- Addresses: NH 16, RP Road
- Location: Nizamabad, Telangana, India
- Postal code: 503001
- Coordinates: 18°40′23″N 78°05′42″E

Gandhi Chowk is a 4-way traffic junction and the largest commercial and business centers in the city of Nizamabad. The place is located in the center of the city and is also the originating point of National Highway 16 which passes through the states of Telangana, Maharashtra and ends at Jagdalpur in the state of Chhattisgarh.

The place is named after Mahatma Gandhi and has a Gandhi statue erected at the center of it. The area is clustered with commercial complexes, showrooms and shopping malls and has high traffic density.

- The routes that originate at Gandhi Chowk are

Road Name	Terminal (in city)	Length in km (in city)
R.P Road (NH 16)	VREC	9
Bodhan Road	Jankampet	10
Gunj Road	Girraj College	3
Azam Road	Radio Station	2

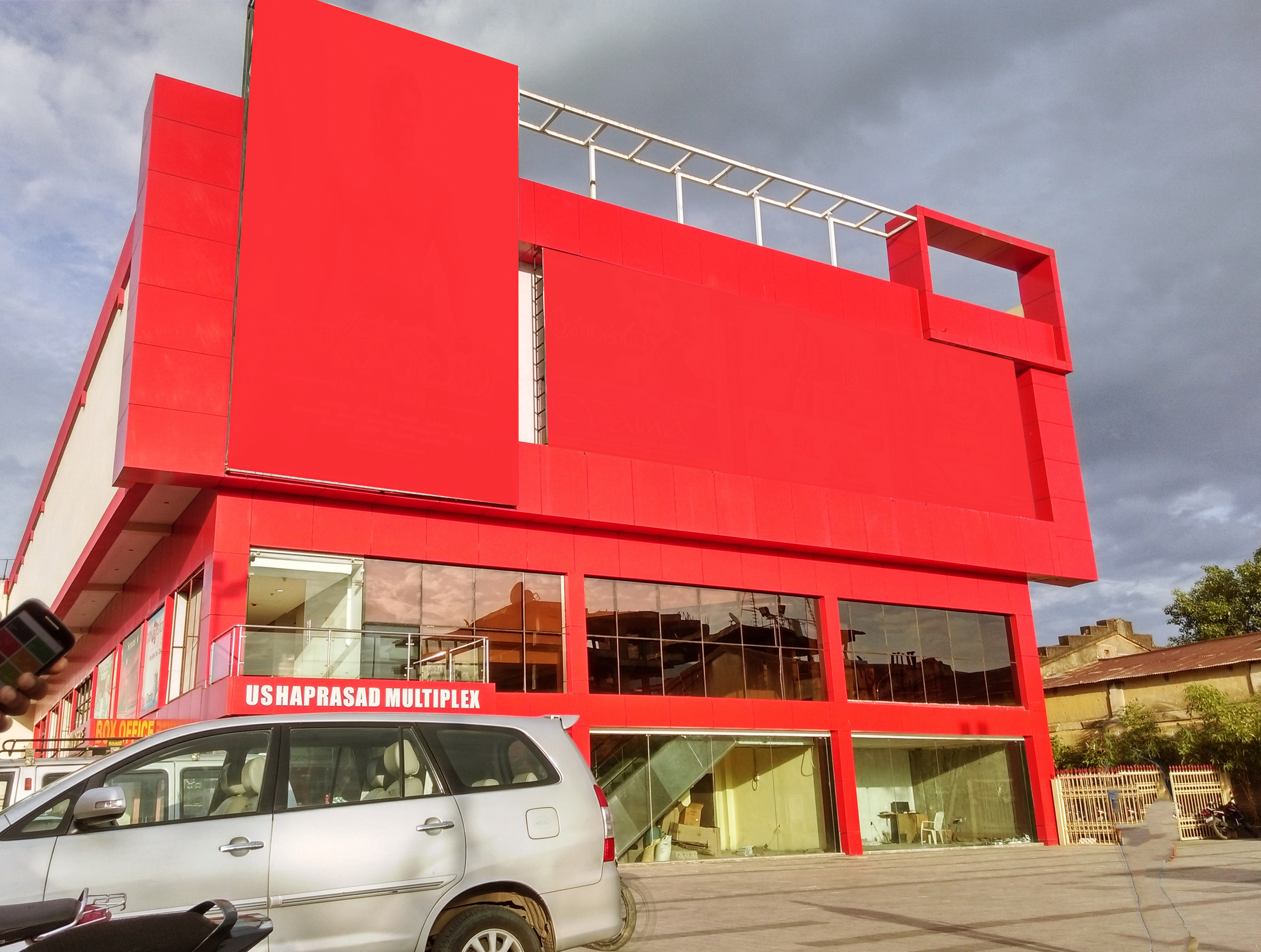
Asian Cinemas Usha Prasad Multiplex at Azam Road.

== Nearby Places ==
=== Gunj Road ===
The main market yard of the district is located at Ganj which is the city's main vegetable market and has some gold showrooms too. Most vegetable vendors are from neighboring district of Nanded. The Gung Road leads to Girraj Government College which is the only autonomous college in the Nizamabad district.

=== R.P Road ===
The NH 16 is known as Rashtrapati Road (R.P Road) in the city. As it is one of the busiest roads in the city, business tycoons of the city has established some major cloth emporiums and medical outlets here. This place is also the home to Nizamabad Bus Station, Nizamabad Medical College, Government General Hospital and Nizamabad Railway Station. Khaleelwadi, also known as Doctor's Lane, is a locality & a hospital clustered area comprising more than 200 major private hospitals and many laboratories is located on R.P Road. The Kanteshwar Temple which is situated at Kanteshwar area can be easily accessed from here. The road terminates at Vijay Rural Engineering College in city, from where on it is known as National Highway.

=== Bodhan Road ===
Bodhan road is the longest route which starts at Gandhi Chowk and ends at Jankampet area which is near the outskirts of the city. This place has a completely different look than R.P Road, the area is heavily clustered with hotels, different type of commercial complexes and has some high rise residential apartments. It is also the home to majority of the Muslim population of the city. Even though the road is asphalt laid, there has been tremendous accidents reported for rash driving, bottlenecks and road blocks. The Government of Telangana has taken up the road widening project which is under progress as of 2015.

=== Azam Road ===
The route leads to Bada Bazar which is another major market yard in the city, the road terminates at Nizamabad Radio Station near Shivaji Chowk from where it divides into Hyderabad Road and Varni Road.

== See also ==
- Nizamabad Police
- Kakatiya Institutions
