= Mubarak Nagar =

Locality in the district of Nizamabad, Telangana, India

Mubarak Nagar is a locality in the district of Nizamabad, Telangana, India.
