= Nizamabad South mandal =

Nizamabad South
- Mandal
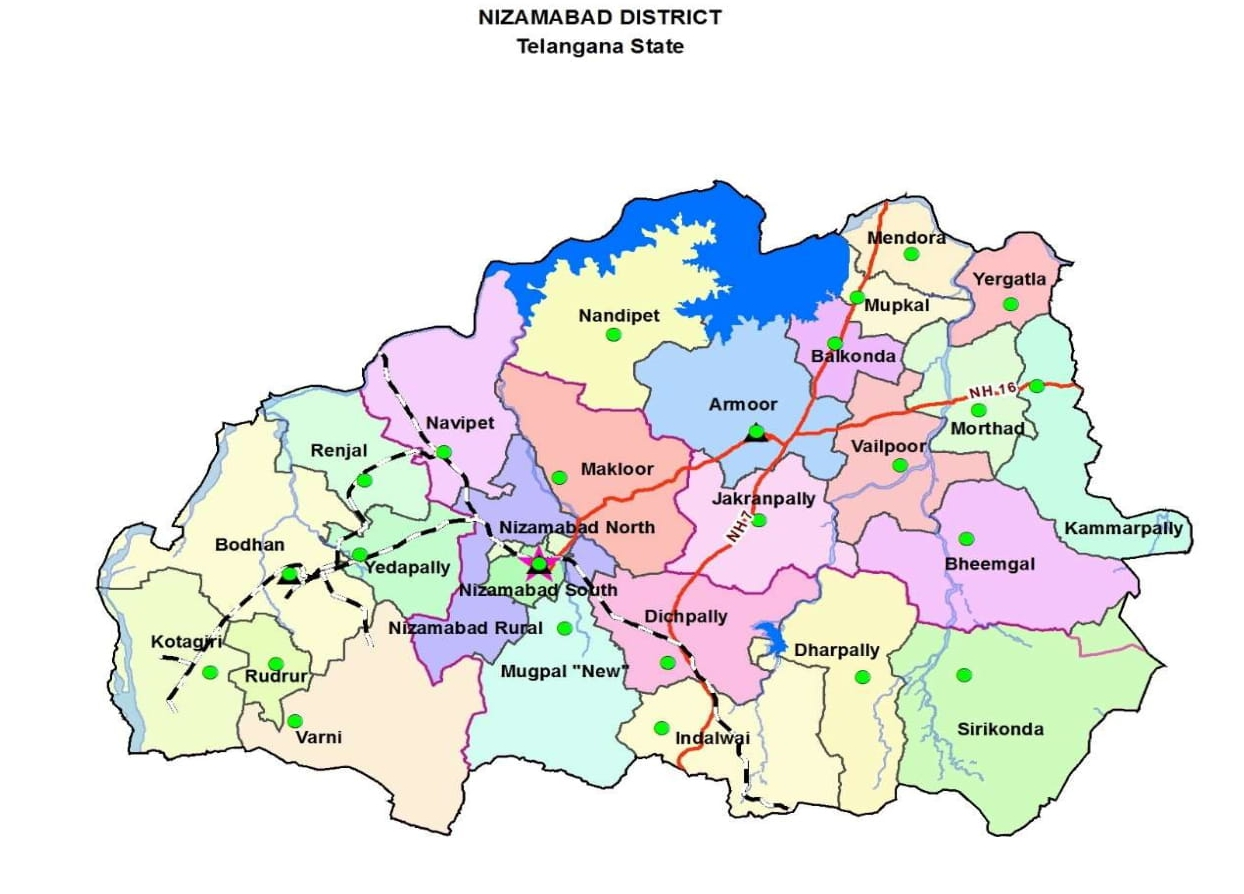
- Mandals of Nizamabad District

- Location in Telangana, India Nizamabad South (India)
- Coordinates: 18.672°N 78.094°E
- Country: India
- State: Telangana
- District: Nizamabad
- Headquarters: Nizamabad

Languages
  - Official: Telugu, Urdu
- Time zone: UTC+5:30 (IST)
- PIN: 503 001,002,003,186,230
- Vehicle registration: TS 16
- Website: nizamabad.telangana.gov.in/mandals-villages/

Nizamabad South is an administrative division located in the revenue division and city of Nizamabad under Nizamabad Urban Constituency. It is one of the 27 mandals within Nizamabad District in the Indian state of Telangana.

On 11 October 2016, the government of Telangana reorganized the districts and mandals of the state. During reorganisation, the erstwhile Nizamabad mandal was divided into four mandals namely Nizamabad North, Nizamabad South, Nizamabad Rural and Mugpal.

== Administration ==
Governed by Nizamabad Municipal Corporation, the Nizamabad South mandal along with Nizamabad North and Nizamabad Rural represent the Lok Sabha constituency of Nizamabad in the state of Telangana.

== Municipal Wards ==
Out of the 60 municipal wards in the city 25 wards are administered under Nizamabad South, the rest of the wards are in Nizamabad North.

The ward numbers under Nizamabad South : 11 to 26, 28 to 36.
