= Shakarnagar =

Coordinates: 18°40′N 77°54′E

Shakkarnagar is a town in Bodhan, Nizamabad, Telangana state, India. It is primarily known for the Nizam Sugar Factory and some historical sites. The plant was at one time Asia's biggest sugar factory.

The town's name is derived from the Urdu and Hindi languages; shakkar "sugar" and nagar "a small area where the people live". The town was affected by the closure and privatization of the sugar factory. The representative of the town for the local legislative assembly was personally involved in the auction of the facility. At that time, the sugar factory's holdings included over 1,600 square kilometres of land, 14 village camps, and the Super Specialty Hospital. Other services that were provided for the children of employees included the Madhu Malancha high school and junior and degree colleges. Shakkaranagar was designed as a model town to provide basic amenities for specialized services in the areas of education, health, sports, and cultural activities. It has had advanced drainage system providing each house a toilet. Only capital Hyderabad has a drainage system. One could say Shakkarnagar before the WW2 was the best town in the whole of South India.

Shakkar Nagar station has a history dating to the Nizam era. The station is right beside the sugar plant, and an exclusive MG Railway line was laid to facilitate movement of sugar cane from farms to the factory when road transport was rare and difficult in those times.
