= Bodhan Assembly constituency =

Constituency of the Telangana legislative assembly in India

Coordinates: 18.66°N 77.89°E

Bodhan
- Constituency No. 12 for the Telangana Legislative Assembly
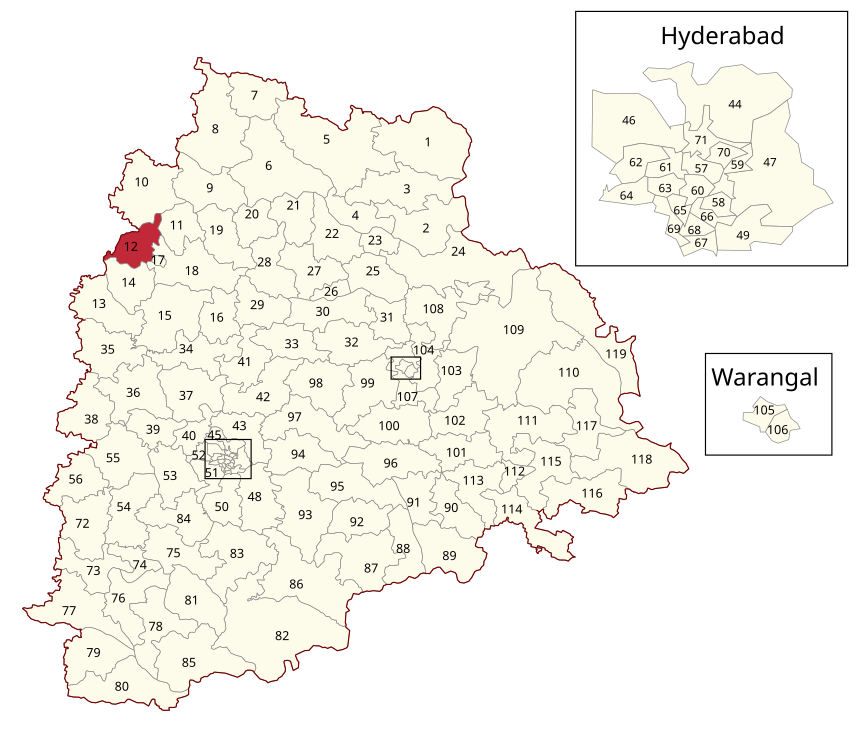
- Location of Bodhan Assembly constituency within Telangana

Constituency details
- Country: India
- Region: South India
- State: Telangana
- District: Nizamabad
- Lok Sabha constituency: Nizamabad
- Established: 1951
- Total electors: 2,07,926
- Reservation: None

Member of Legislative Assembly
- 3rd Telangana Legislative Assembly
- Incumbent P. Sudarshan Reddy
- Party: Indian National Congress
- Elected year: 2023

Bodhan is a constituency of the Telangana Legislative Assembly, in India. It is one of five constituencies in Nizamabad district and is part of Nizamabad Lok Sabha constituency. Currently the constituency is represented by Indian National Congress leader P. Sudarshan Reddy.

== Mandals ==
The Assembly Constituency presently comprises the following Mandals:

Mandal
Bodhan
Ranjal
Navipet
Yedapally
Saloora

== Members of Legislative Assembly ==
Duration	Member	Political party
Hyderabad State
1952-57	S.L. Sastri	Indian National Congress
Andhra Pradesh
1957-62	Srinivasa Rao	Independent politician
1962-67	M. Ramgopal Reddy	Independent politician
1967-72	R.B. Rao	Independent politician
1972-78	Narayan Reddy	Indian National Congress
1978-83	Gulam Samdani	Indian National Congress
1983-85	D. Sambasiva Rao	Telugu Desam Party
1985-89	Bashiruddin Babukhan	Telugu Desam Party
1989-94	Kotha Ramakanth	Telugu Desam Party
1994-99	Bashiruddin Babukhan	Telugu Desam Party
1999-04	Podduturi Sudarshan Reddy	Indian National Congress
2004-09	Podduturi Sudarshan Reddy	Indian National Congress
2009-14	Podduturi Sudarshan Reddy	Indian National Congress
Telangana
2014-18	Shakil Aamir Mohammed	Telangana Rashtra Samithi
2018-23	Shakil Aamir Mohammed	Telangana Rashtra Samithi
2023-	Podduturi Sudarshan Reddy	Indian National Congress

== Election results ==
=== Telangana Legislative Assembly election, 2023 ===
Telangana Assembly Elections, 2023: Bodhan
Party	Candidate	Votes	%	±%
INC	P. Sudarshan Reddy	66,963	38.95	
BRS	Mohammed Shakil Amir	63,901	37.17	
BJP	Vaddi Mohan Reddy	33,555	19.52	
NOTA	None of the Above	872	0.51	
Majority		3,062	1.78	
Turnout		1,71,929		
INC gain from BRS		Swing		

=== Telangana Legislative Assembly election, 2018 ===
2018 Telangana Legislative Assembly election: Bodhan
Party	Candidate	Votes	%	±%
TRS	Mohammed Shakil Amir	74,895	47.14	
INC	P. Sudarshan Reddy	66,794	42.04	
BJP	Aljapur Srinivas	8,434	5.31	
SS	Gopi Kishan	2,425	1.53	
NOTA	None of the Above	1,862	1.17	
Majority		8,101	5.20	
Turnout		1,58,870	81.34	
TRS hold		Swing		

=== Telangana Legislative Assembly election, 2014 ===
2014 Telangana Legislative Assembly election: Bodhan
Party	Candidate	Votes	%	±%
TRS	Mohammed Shakil Amir	67,426	44.00	
INC	P. Sudarshan Reddy	51,543	33.96	
TDP	Medapati Prakash Reddy	26,558	17.50	
BSP	Siluula Ganesh	1497	0.99	
Majority		15,884	9.04	
Turnout		1,51,771	76.89	
TRS gain from INC		Swing		

=== Andhra Pradesh Legislative Assembly election, 2009 ===
Andhra Pradesh Assembly Elections, 2009: Bodhan
Party	Candidate	Votes	%	±%
INC	P. Sudarshan Reddy	42,494	32.19	
TRS	Mohammed Shakil Amir	41,219	31.22	
PRP	C. Karunakar Reddy	34,142	25.86	
BJP	Kotigari Shivappa	8,594	6.51	
Majority		1,275	0.75	
Turnout				
INC hold		Swing		

== See also ==
- List of constituencies of Telangana Legislative Assembly
