= Padgal =

- Village
- Padgal, Nizamabad, Telangana, India Padgal (India)
- Coordinates: 18°49′27″N 78°22′7″E
- Country: India
- State: Telangana
- District: Nizamabad

Population (2011)
  - Total: 5,688

Padgal is a village located in Nizamabad district in Telangana, India.

It was formerly within the state of Andhra Pradesh.

== Demographics ==
According to the 2011 Census of India, Padgal had a total population of 5,688 people; of whom 2,811 were male and 2,877 were female.

2,510 of the population were recorded as literate.
