= Nizam Sugar Factory =

Indian sugar factory

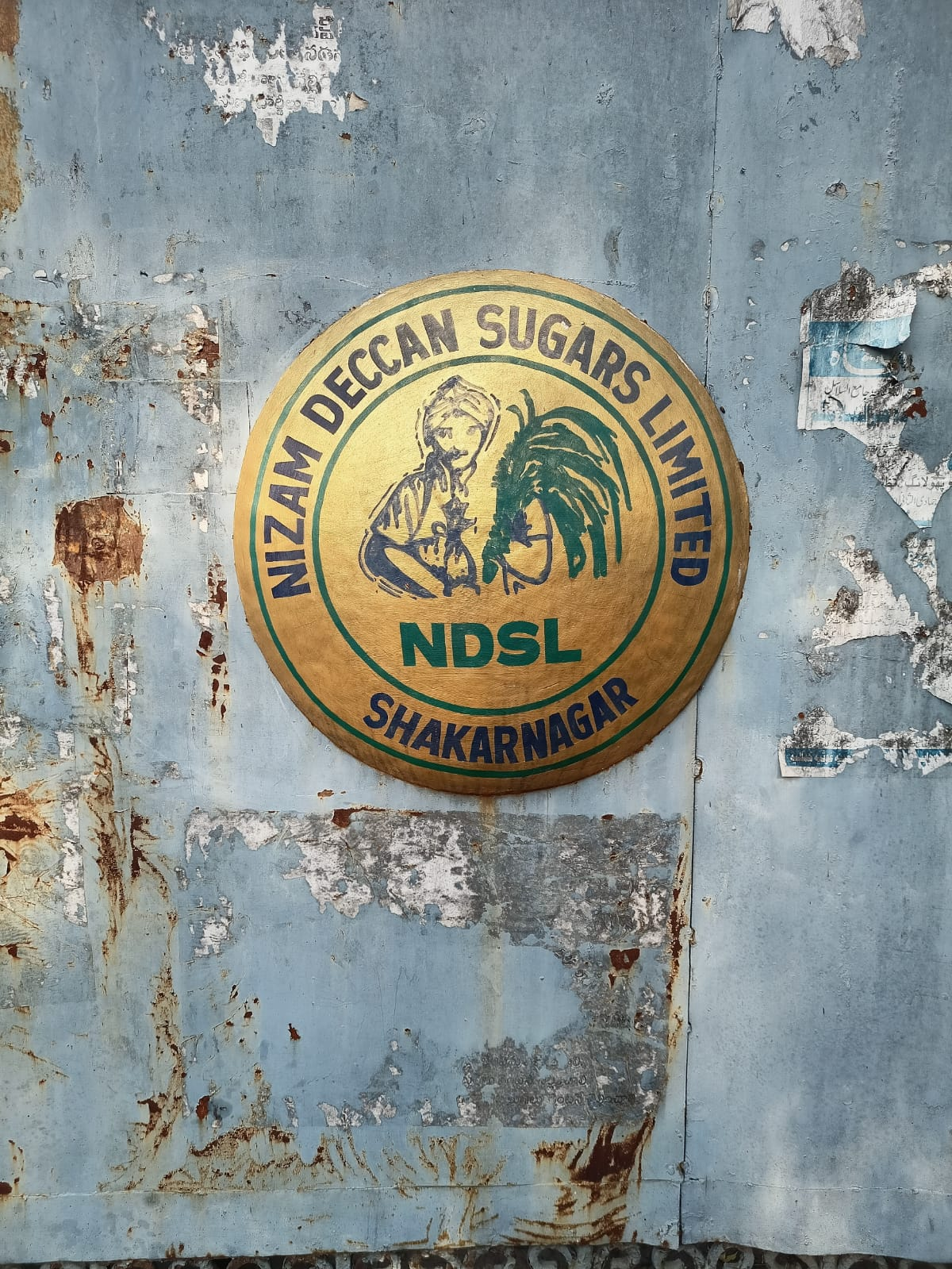
- Entrance of Nizam sugar factory
- Type: Private (Government)
- Industry: sugar
- Founded: 1937 (89 years ago)
- Founder: Osman Ali Khan
- Products: sugar
- Parent: Government of Telangana
- Website: www.nizamdeccansugars.com

Nizam Sugar Factory also known as Nizam Deccan Sugars Limited (NDSL) is a sugar factory situated in Bodhan town of Nizamabad district, Telangana, Shakarnagar, India. The factory is located 25 kilometers from district headquarters, Nizamabad and is known for being the largest sugar factory in Asia, when it was commissioned. In recent years, the factory has been functioning seasonally. It was founded by the 7th Nizam of Hyderabad.

== History ==
Nizam Sugar Factory was established in 1937 during the reign of the last Nizam of the Kingdom of Hyderabad, Mir Osman Ali Khan. It was established over 15,000 acres and the location was named Shakarnagar and was the largest sugar factory in Asia at that time. The factory was a major employer during the Nizam period. The NSF has lands in Bodhan, Yedpalli, Kotgir and Renjal mandals, with some parcels auctioned in 2001.

In 2002, the factory was privatised by N. Chandrababu Naidu and then it began incurring heavy losses. Former MP & Delta Sugars Chairman Gokaraju Ganga Raju bought Nizam Sugars. It was set up by the Nizams about 80 years ago and was earning profits till it fell on hard times leading to its privatisation in public – private participation. Later, a legislative committee appointed by Naidu's successor Y.S. Rajasekhara Reddy had recommended that government should take over the factory. However, the recommendation could not be implemented due to Reddy's death. In 2014, K.Chandrashekar Rao's Telangana Rashtra Samithi had promised during the movement for a separate Telangana state that the government will take over the factory and restore its glory.

== Current State ==
As of 2015, the state government owns 49 percent of the factory, with the remaining controlling stake behind held by Delta Sugars. Nizam sugar factory has been laid off by Telangana Govt in 2015, mentioning that they will completely handover the factory to the government. But no action has been taken on factory and employees are not given salaries for three years.
