= Government General Hospital, Nizamabad =

Government General Hospital
- Government of Telangana

Geography
- Location: RP Road, Nizamabad, Telangana, India

Organisation
- Care system: Public
- Type: Full-service medical center & teaching hospital
- Affiliated university: Dr. KNR University of Health Sciences

Services
- Emergency department: Yes

Links
- Website: http://www.gmcnzb.org/

Government General Hospital, also known as Nizamabad Government Hospital, is a major state-owned hospital situated in Nizamabad, Telangana. The hospital is funded and managed by the state government of Telangana.It is one of the largest hospitals in the state.

== History ==
The Government General Hospital was started around 1995, in the current Nizamabad Medical College campus building. In the year 2010, after receiving a notice from Medical Council of India to start a Medical college in Nizamabad city, the construction of new government hospital building started in Khaleelwadi ground, the newly built Rs 3.5 crore stadium in the Khaleelwadi ground had to be demolished and the land was earmarked for the new hospital buildings. The construction of the huge 8 floor structure came to an end in 2012.By the end of 2012, the old government hospital was shifted to newly built building, while the old hospital campus was renovated by both the state and central government for the new medical college. After receiving a nod from Medical Council of India (MCI), the hospital inauguration and college's academic year started from 2013.

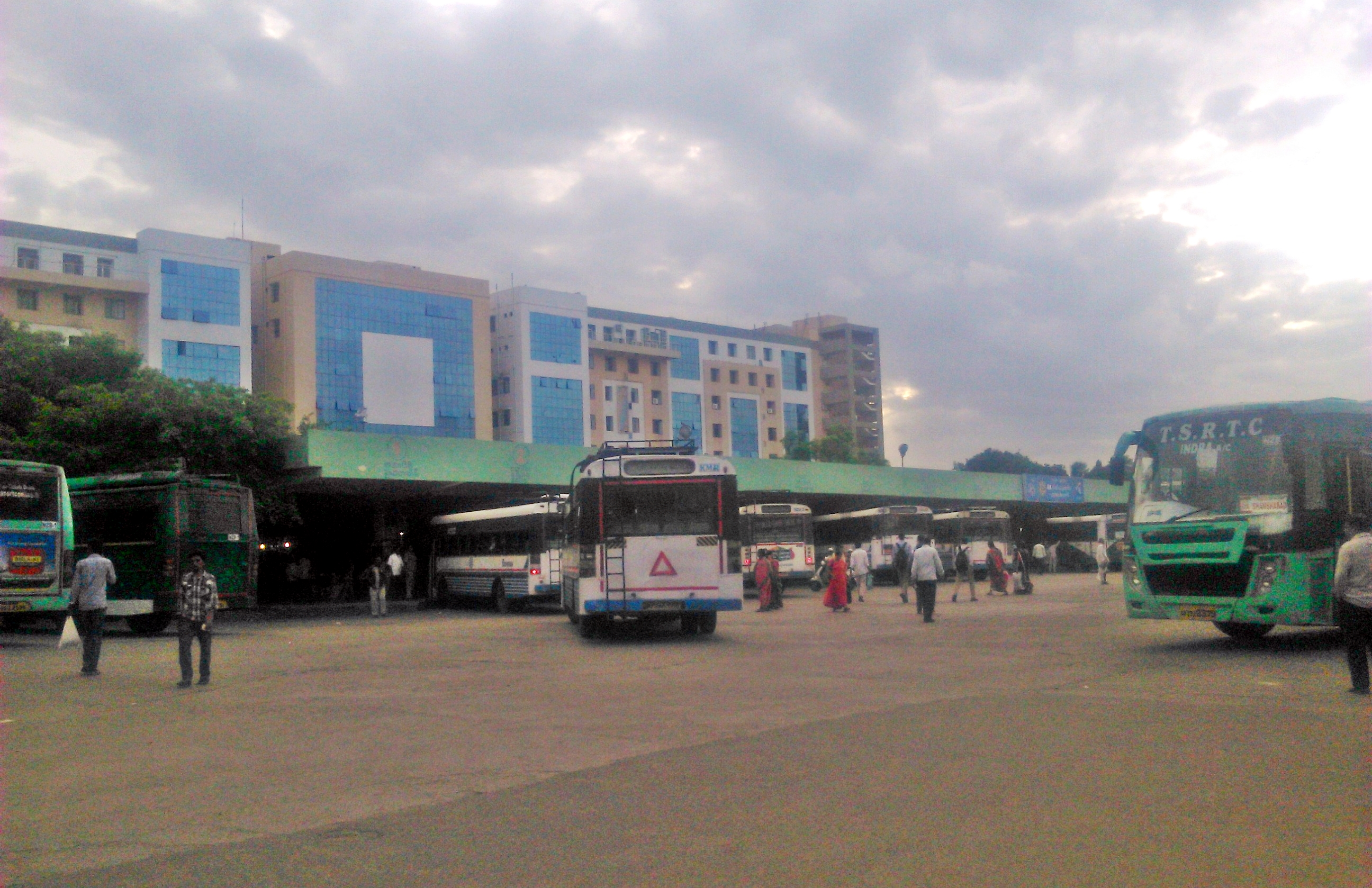
Nizamabad Government Hospital.

== Infrastructure ==
In all six buildings, including two major 8-storey structures with all necessary amenities were built as part of this Rs.90 crore mega project. Since the new hospital and medical college campus are located opposite to each other on the 20 acre highly urbanized area they are connected by a foot-over bridge.
