= Bashiruddin Babukhan =

Indian politician (born 1941)

- In office 1985–1989
- Constituency: Bodhan
- In office 1994–1999

Personal details
- Born: 1941
- Died: 2013 (aged 71–72)

Bashiruddin Babukhan (1941–2013) was an Indian educationist, philanthropist, and politician.

== Political career ==
He was elected as a Member of Legislative Assembly from Bodhan in 1985, and again in 1994. He was a cabinet minister in the Fourth N. T. Rama Rao ministry, holding the portfolios of education, major industries, tourism and minorities welfare.

After the Telugu Desam Party joined the National Democratic Alliance in 1998, he resigned from his ministerial positions.
