= Nizamabad Urban Development Authority =

Government agency in Telangana, India

Nizamabad Urban Development Authority (NUDA)
- నిజామాబాదు నగర అభివృద్ధి సంస్థ (నుడా)

Agency overview
- Formed: 10 July 2017 (9 years ago)
- Preceding agency: Nizamabad Municipal Corporation
- Type: Urban Planning Agency
- Jurisdiction: Government of Telangana
- Headquarters: Nizamabad; 18.672°N 78.094°E
- Minister responsible: Minister of Municipal Administration and Urban Development of Telangana
- Agency executive: Mr Kesha Venu, Chairman
- Parent department: Government of Telangana

The Nizamabad Urban Development Authority (NUDA) is an urban planning agency in Nizamabad district of the Indian state of Telangana. It was set up on 10 May 2017 by the Telangana state government and has its headquarters at Nizamabad.

The urban development agency with a geographical area of 169.37 square kilometres (65.39 sq mi) spreading across Nizamabad North, South and Rural mandals of the city sees over the infrastructure development and planning for 3,14,035 urban and 3,22,781 rural residents, tallying the overall population to about 6,33,933 under the urban agglomeration.

== Bounds ==
Telangana Municipal Administration Minister K Taraka Rama Rao released GO MS No 271 setting up Nizamabad Urban Development Authority (NUDA) to merge Nizamabad Municipal Corporation and surrounding 72 gram panchayats & villages situated in six mandals of Nizamabad district.

Sl.No	Village/Panchayat	Population 2011
1	Amruthapur	3149
2	Devnagar Camp	1686
3	Arepally	1232
4	Bardipoor	8433
5	Dharmaram (B)	1738
6	Mentrajpally	5942
7	Naka Thanda	5442
8	Westly Nagar Thanda	2357
9	Mullangi (I)	1816
10	Amrad	4844
11	Amrad Thanda	2677
12	Bonkanpally	2947
13	Chinnapoor	1624
14	Madanpally	2752
15	Satlapoor Thanda	2715
16	Makloor	8867
17	KindiThanda	4376
18	Singampally Thanda	2147
19	Mamidipally	2487
20	Mullangi (B)	1185
21	Oddiatpally	2174
22	Singampally	8630
23	Kanjar	4829
24	Oddera Colony	4598
25	Kulaspoor	4653
26	Kulaspoor Thanda	4229
27	Mudakpally	6359
28	GudiThanda	6359
29	Sriram Nagar (T)	4304
30	Mugpal	3469
31	Nyalkal	3909
32	Sirpoor	2648
33	Thanakurd	1053
34	Abbapoor (M)	1295
35	Abhangapatnam	3336
36	Station Area (Nizamabad Rural)	87658
37	Ananthagiri	1008
38	Dharmaram [A]	698
39	Mahantham	1039
40	Mokanpally	2166
41	Narayanapoor	1201
42	Dharmaram (M)	1538
43	Dharmaram (T)	998
44	Gundaram	6179
45	Ram Nagar	5892
46	Shastri Nagar	5892
47	Sri Nagar	11457
48	Jalalpoor	1262
49	Keshapoor	739
50	Kondoor	2628
51	Laxmapoor	666
52	Malkapoor [A]	1160
53	Malkapoor (M&J)	3871
54	Mallaram	4539
55	Chakradar Nagar (T)	3647
56	Gandhi Nagar	4433
57	Muthakunta	1131
58	Lingi Thanda	1151
59	Palda	2141
60	Thirmanpally	1351
61	Dhupally	3685
62	Moulalipoor (Mosra GP)	992
63	Jaithapoor	1527
64	Jamlam	1648
65	MSC Farm	1651
66	Jankampet	10086
67	Kurnapally	7502
68	Mallapahad (Mangalpahad GP)	1356
69	Mangalpahad	2319
70	Pocharam	1195
71	Thanakalan	4058
72	Bapunagar	1651
	Adjoining Merged Population	318747
	Total MCN Population	314035
	Total NUDA Population	6,32,782
