= Badapahad =

Badapahad Peddagutta
- village
- Location in Telangana, India
- Coordinates: 18°29′37″N 78°1′0″E
- Country: India
- State: Telangana
- District: Nizamabad
- Named for: A medieval revenue officer and saint known as Syed Sadullah Hussaini

Government
  - Body: wakf board
- Elevation: 375 m (1,230 ft)

Languages
  - Official: Urdu and Telugu
- Time zone: UTC+5:30 (IST)

Badapahad Dargah, Peddagutta is a small town, village and Muslim pilgrim center. Built in the memory of the saint Syed Sadullah Hussain, the mosque is situated atop a hillock paidimal village in the Varni Mandal of Nizamabad district.

The Dargah is located at a distance of 38 km from the town of Nizamabad. Many Muslim devotees as well as Hindu devotees climb approximately one thousand steps every year to summit the hill.

The three-day annual festival of Urus at Badapahad is held every September. Devotees from Telangana, Andhra Pradesh, Maharashtra and Karnataka attend the festival.

Dargah is held under the aegis of Wakf Board. It is the only place where old coins are still being distributed.

== Geography ==
Badapahad has an average elevation of 375 metres (1,230 ft). It is surrounded by Saidpur of Varni Mandal to the North and East, Paidmal of Varni Mandal to the South and Hanmajipet of Banswada Mandal to the South and West

It is 38 km from Nizamabad, 27km from Bodhan 172 km from Hyderabad and 52 km from Kamareddy.

== Demographics ==
Telugu and Urdu are the local languages. The total population of Badapahad is 3,963. The population is 2,016 males and 1,947 females, living in 853 houses. The total area of Badapahad is 1,720 hectares.
