= Government Medical College, Nizamabad =

Medical college in Nizamabad, Telangana, India

Nizamabad Medical College
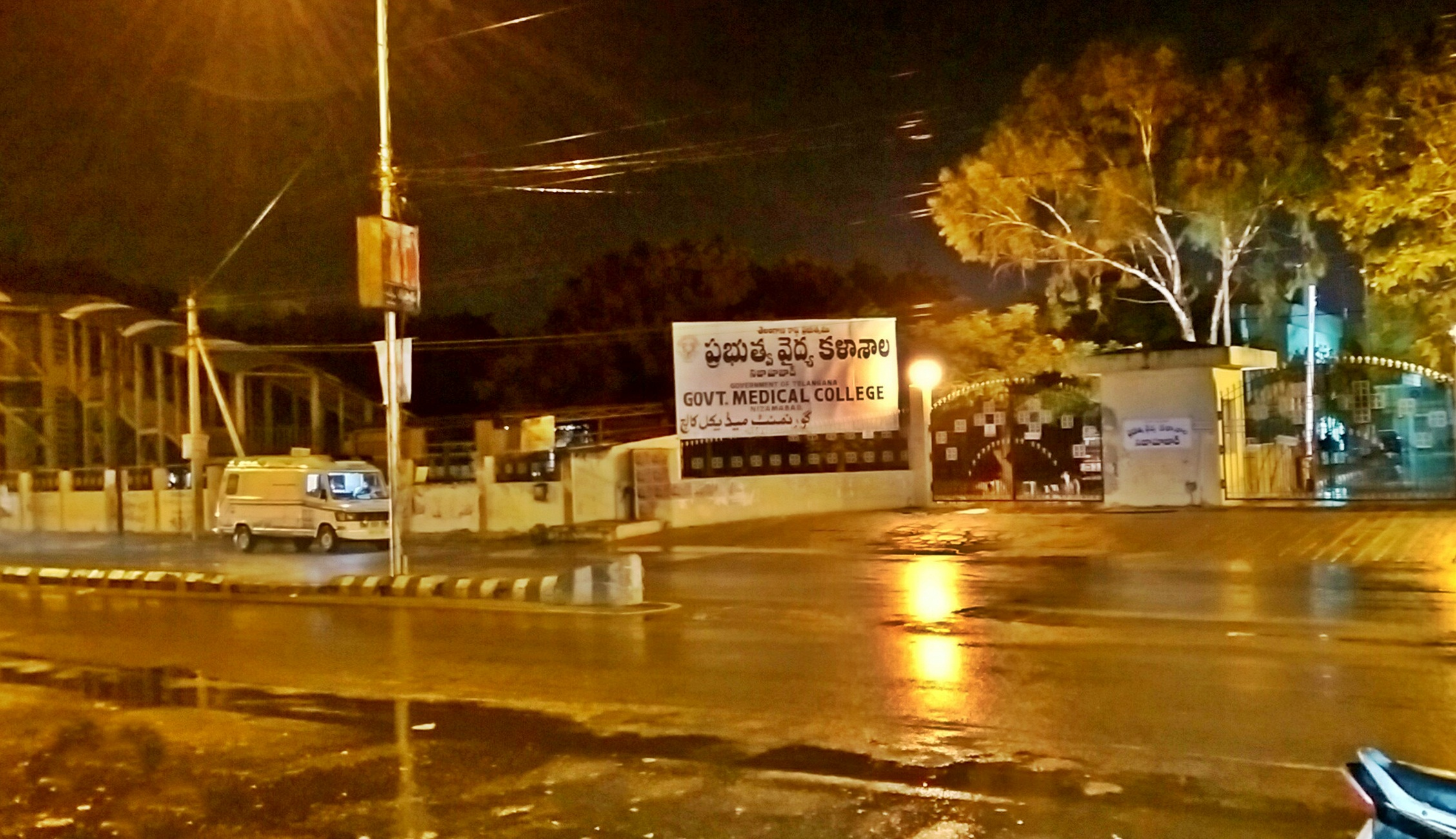
- Main Entrance Gates
- Type: Medical Education
- Established: 2013; 13 years ago
- Affiliations: Kaloji Narayana Rao University of Health Sciences, NMC
- Principal: Dr. N. Krishna Mohan
- Location: Nizamabad, Telangana, India 503001; 18.6731625°N 78.0986808°E
- Campus: Urban
- Website: www.gmcnzb.org

Government Medical College also Nizamabad Medical College is a medical college located in Nizamabad, Telangana, India. It began its academic year from 2013 to 2014. It is affiliated to Kaloji Narayana Rao University of Health Sciences.

== History ==
It received clearance from Medical Council of India to start its academic year from year 2013–14 with 100 seats for MBBS.

The college also has DNB Seats in various Broad speciality courses like General Medicine, General Surgery, Obstetrics & Gynaecology, Anesthesia and Paediatrics (updated as per July-17 session).

== See also ==
- Government General Hospital, Nizamabad
- Education in India
- Literacy in India
- List of institutions of higher education in Telangana
- Medical Council of India
