= Nizamabad Bus Station =

Bus station in Telangana, India

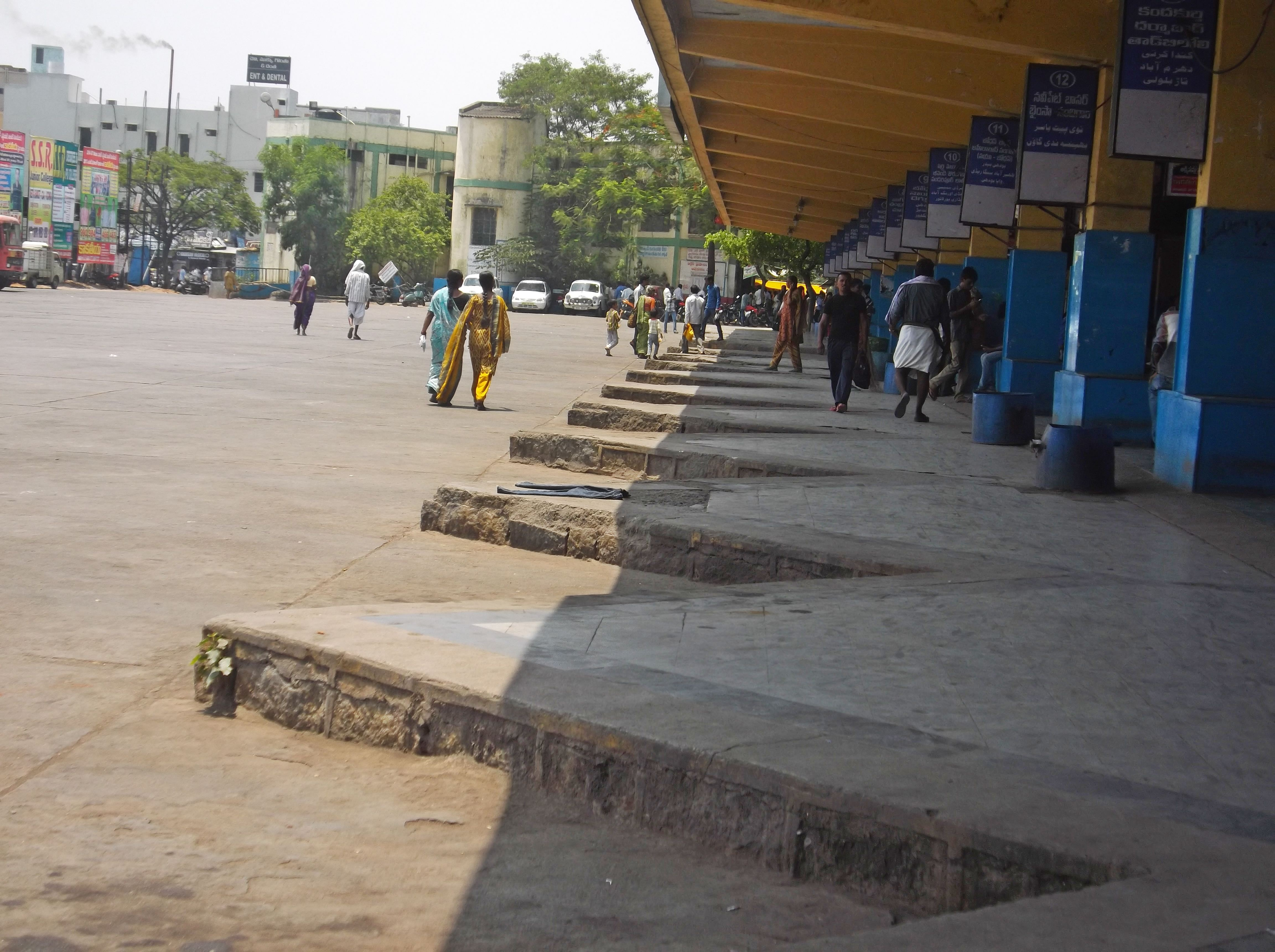

General information
- Location: Nizamabad, Telangana; India
- Coordinates: 18.675083°N 78.100109°E
- Owner: TSRTC
- Operator: Government of Telangana
- Platforms: 30

Construction
- Structure type: At Grade
- Parking: Yes

Other information
- Station code: NZB

Passengers
- Daily: 25,000+
Location

Nizamabad Bus Station (NZB) is a bus station located at the center of Nizamabad city in the state of Telangana, India. The bus station is owned by Telangana State Road Transport Corporation (TSRTC) and is one of the major bus stations in the newly formed state of Telangana. The bus station is well connected to most of the cities and towns in the Telangana state erstwhile Andhra Pradesh. There are a total of 30 platforms. A waiting hall for reserved passengers is provided by TSRTC. There is an old bus stop (old bus station) & 2 bus depots (NZB1 & NZB2) located in the city.

== Services ==
Bus service is one of the important modes of transportation in Nizamabad. The Telangana State Road Transport Corporation (TSRTC) runs around 700 buses from the city on a daily basis. They also offer a premium service, with Mercedes Benz and Volvo buses, from Nizamabad to Hyderabad and Bangalore.

TSRTC also connects to other major cities like Mumbai, Pune, Nagpur, Warangal, Tirupathi, Suryapet, Vijayawada and Godavarikhani. The bus station is well connected to most of the cities and towns in the state. The city is also connected to important cities in other states such as Mumbai, Bangalore, Nagpur, Akola, Nanded, and Gulbarga. TSRTC lines using the station include Pallevelugu, Express, Deluxe, Super Luxury, Indra AC, Garuda, Garuda Plus and Mercedes Benz

== Gallery ==
Nizamabad Bus Station
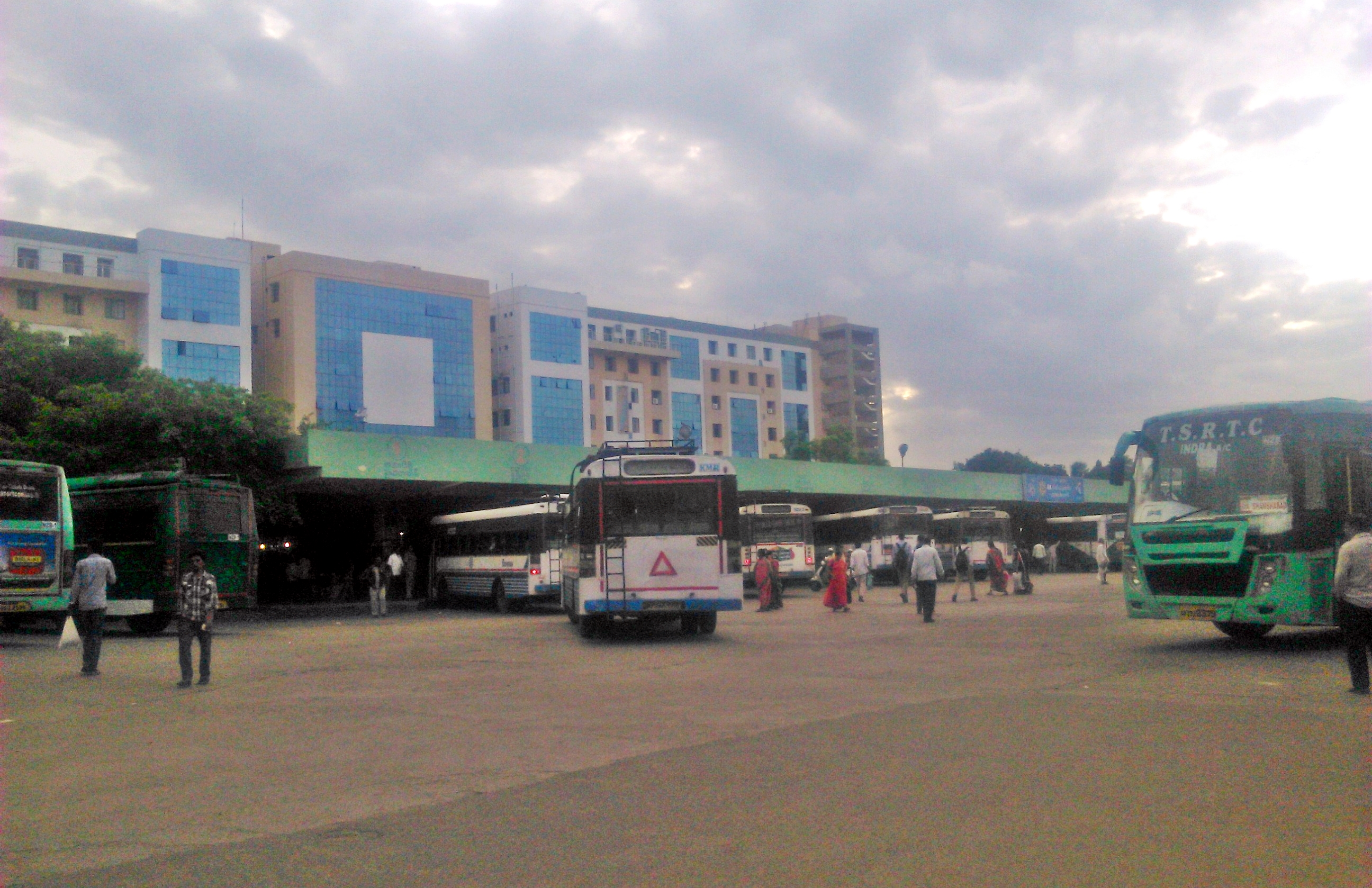
Nizamabad Bus Station.District Govt Hospital can also been seen

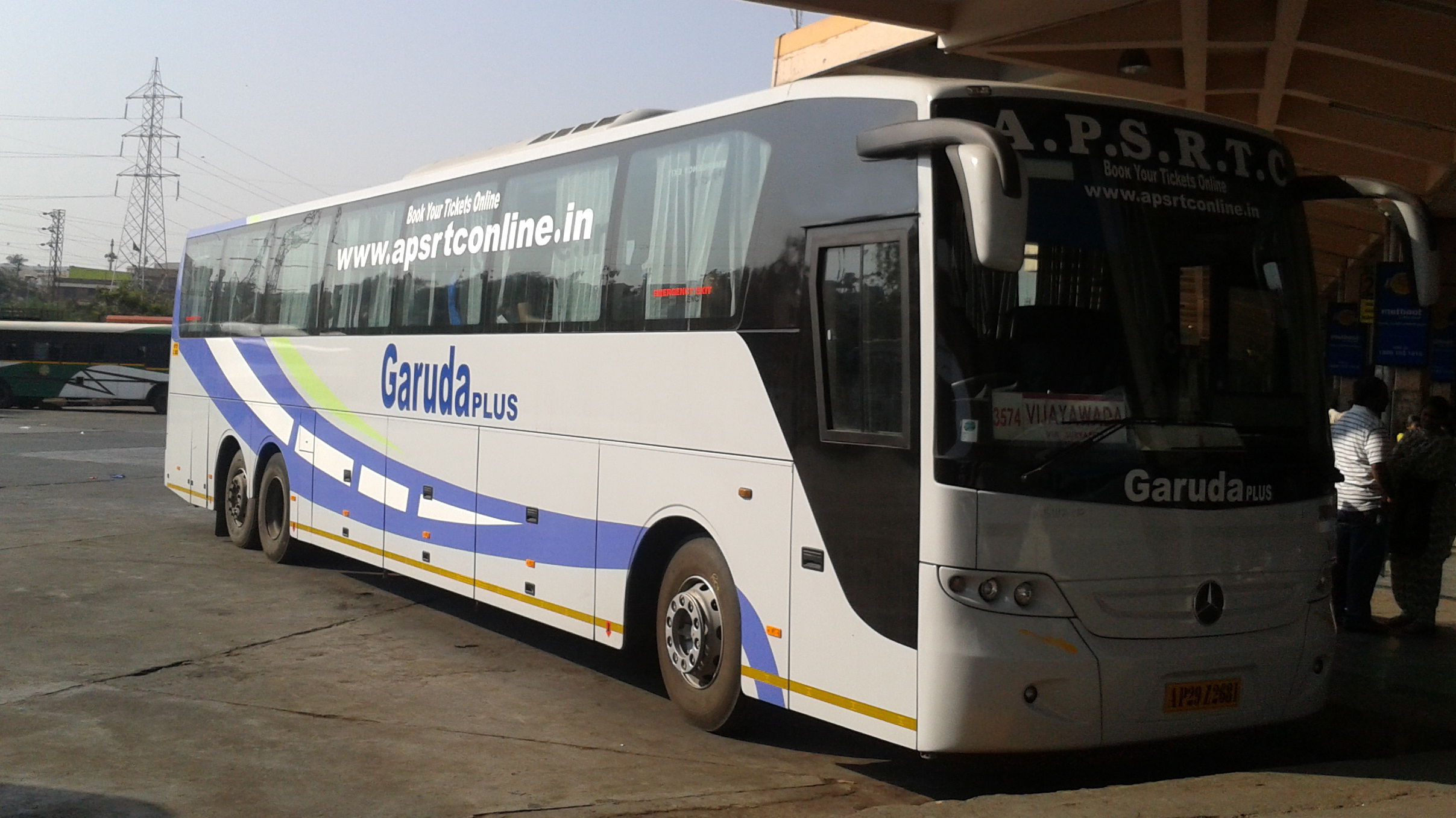
Garuda Plus bus service of the TSRTC

== See also ==
- Nizamabad Railway Station
