= P. Sudarshan Reddy =

Indian politician

Advisor to the Government of Telangana for Implementation of Flagship Welfare and Developmental Schemes
- Cabinet rank
- Assumed office 2025

Member of Telangana Legislative Assembly
- Incumbent
- Assumed office 2023
- Constituency: Bodhan Assembly constituency

Minister for Major and Minor Irrigation, Government of Andhra Pradesh
- In office 2011–2014

Minister for Medical Education, Government of Andhra Pradesh
- In office 2009–2011

Personal details
- Born: August 2, 1949 (age 77) Nizamabad district, Hyderabad State, India
- Party: Indian National Congress
- Profession: Politician

Podduturi Sudarshan Reddy (born 2 August 1949) is an Indian politician from Telangana and a senior leader of the Indian National Congress. He is currently serving as Advisor to the Government of Telangana for Implementation of Flagship Welfare and Developmental Schemes with Cabinet rank.

A four-time MLA from Bodhan Assembly constituency, Reddy previously served as Cabinet Minister in the undivided Andhra Pradesh government under chief ministers Y. S. Rajasekhara Reddy, Konijeti Rosaiah and Nallari Kiran Kumar Reddy. He served as Minister for Medical Education from 2009 to 2011 and later as Minister for Major and Minor Irrigation from 2011 to 2014.

Reddy is currently a member of the Telangana Legislative Assembly representing the Bodhan Assembly constituency in Nizamabad district. He won the 2023 Telangana Legislative Assembly election as a candidate of the Indian National Congress.

In the 2009 Andhra Pradesh Legislative Assembly election, he was the only Congress MLA elected from the undivided Nizamabad district.

Following the formation of the Congress government in Telangana in 2023, Reddy was considered a strong contender for a cabinet berth in the government led by Chief Minister Revanth Reddy.

In 2025, the Government of Telangana appointed him Advisor for Implementation of Flagship Welfare and Developmental Schemes with Cabinet rank to oversee the implementation and coordination of major welfare and developmental programmes of the state government. He was also accorded special invitee status for Telangana cabinet meetings.

== Early life and education ==
Reddy is from Siranpally village in Navipet mandal, Nizamabad district. He was born to the late Ganga Reddy and Rukmamma. He passed Class 12 and later discontinued his studies while pursuing the second year of his B.A.

== Career ==
Reddy was first elected as a Member of the Andhra Pradesh Legislative Assembly from the Bodhan Assembly constituency in the 1999 Andhra Pradesh Legislative Assembly election, defeating K. Ramakanth of the Telugu Desam Party by 9,289 votes. He was re-elected in the 2004 election after defeating Abdul Khader of the Telugu Desam Party by a margin of 16,999 votes. He retained the constituency for a third consecutive term in the 2009 Andhra Pradesh Legislative Assembly election.

During his political career in undivided Andhra Pradesh, Reddy served in key ministerial positions under three chief ministers. He was Minister for Medical Education in the cabinets of Y. S. Rajasekhara Reddy and Konijeti Rosaiah. Later, he served as Minister for Major Irrigation in the cabinet of Nallari Kiran Kumar Reddy.

Reddy was the only Congress MLA elected from the undivided Nizamabad district in the 2009 Assembly elections and played an important role in strengthening the party organisation in the region.

Following the formation of Telangana, he contested the 2014 and 2018 Assembly elections from Bodhan but was unsuccessful.

In the 2023 Telangana Legislative Assembly election, he won from the Bodhan Assembly constituency as a candidate of the Indian National Congress, defeating Mohammed Shakil Aamir of the Bharat Rashtra Samithi by a margin of 3,062 votes.

In 2025, the Government of Telangana appointed him as Advisor to the Government for Implementation of Flagship Welfare and Developmental Schemes with Cabinet rank.
