= Nizamabad Municipal Corporation =

Local civic body in Nizamabad, Telangana, India

Type
- Type: Municipal Corporation of the Nizamabad, Telangana

History
- Founded: 1931 (95 years ago)

Leadership
- Mayor: Umarani Mudiraj, INC
- Deputy Mayor: Salma Tahseen, AIMIM
- Municipal Commissioner: Jitesh Patil, I.A.S.

Structure
- Seats: 60 (2020)
- Political groups: Government (32): INC (17); AIMIM (14); BRS (1); Opposition (28): BJP (28)

Elections
- Last election: 2026

Meeting place
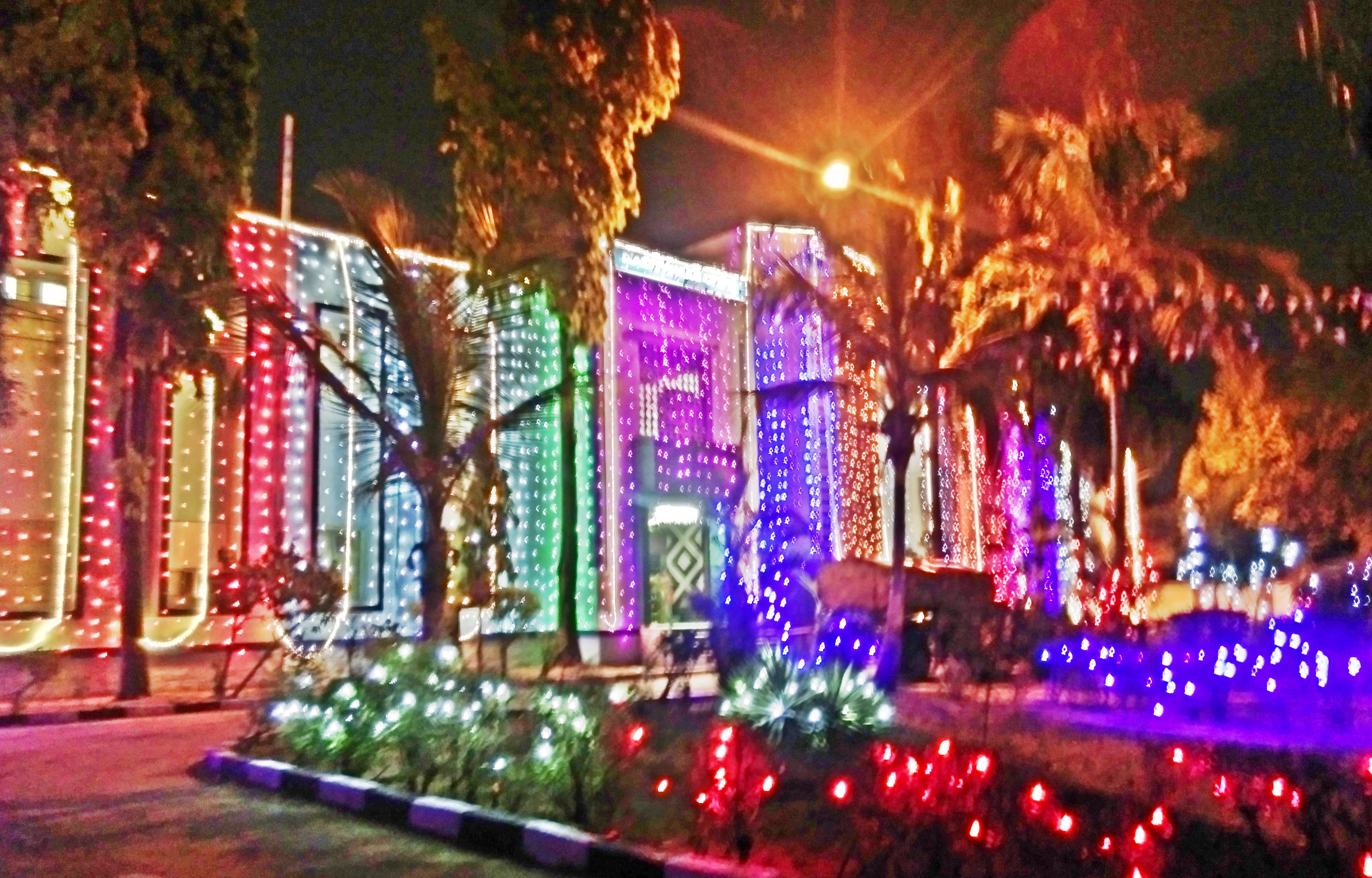
- MCN Building, Yellammagutta, Nizamabad, Telangana 503003

Website
- Nizamabad Municipal Corporation

The Nizamabad Municipal Corporation (NMC) is the local governing body, administering the city of Nizamabad in the Indian state of Telangana. As of 2011 census, the municipal corporation had a population of 310,467. The municipal corporation consists of democratically elected members, is headed by a mayor and administers the city's governance, infrastructure and administration.

== History ==
The municipality was constituted in 1931 and upgraded as special grade municipality in 1987. The Nizamabad Municipality was upgraded as Nizamabad Municipal Corporation on 5 March 2005

== Administration ==
The Municipal Corporation building is located at Yellamagutta in the city. Currently there are 60 divisions in Nizamabad. The municipal corporation administers the jurisdiction of the district headquarters. It also administers the E-governance services of the district. The last municipal elections were held in February 2026.

== Elections ==
=== 2026 NMC election ===
S.No.	Party Name	Won
1	Bharatiya Janata Party	28
2	Indian National Congress	17
3	All India Majlis-e-Ittehadul Muslimeen	14
4	Bharat Rashtra Samithi	1

=== 2020 NMC election ===
S.No.	Party Name	Won
1	Bharatiya Janata Party	28
2	All India Majlis-e-Ittehadul Muslimeen	16
3	Bharat Rashtra Samithi	13
4	Indian National Congress	2
5	Independent	1

Pincode	Area
503001	Nizamabad Urban
503002	Kanteshwar / Subhash Nagar
503003	Nizamabad Rural
503186	Arsapalli / Sarangpur
503230	Madhav Nagar

== Wards ==
Reorganized wards and divisions constituted by Nizamabad Municipal Corporation from the January 2020 elections:

Ward no.	No. of voters	Bounds
1	5303	Kalur and Khanapur
2	5040	Manikbhandar & Borgaon (K)
3	4019	Manikbhandar (rest) & Gopanpally
4	4857	Bank Colony, Borgaon, Arya Nagar (Till Hanuman Mandir)
5	5150	Borgaon (P)
6	5236	New Housing Board Colony, Vinayak nagar
7	5160	Rotary Nagar, Chandra Nagar, Gayatri Nagar, Nyalkal Road
8	4903	Sitaram Nagar, Anand Nagar, Varni Rd, Sai Nagar, Santosh Nagar
9	4916	Indira Nagar, Old Nagaram, Waddar Colony, Sri Ram Nagar, Sai Nagar
10	5170	80 Quarters, 50 Quarters, SS Nagar, Driver Colony, Dharmapuri Hills, Babansahab Pahadi
11	5231	300 Quarters, Asad Baba Nagar, Babansahab Pahadi, Shujath Nagar, Vengal Rao Colony
12	4823	Babansahab Pahadi (North), Driver Colony (East), Madina Eidgah, Canal Katta
13	5179	Auto Nagar, Dairy Farm, Sarangpur
14	5096	Malapally, Mujahid Nagar, Arsapalli, NRI Colony, Lateef Colony, Nizam Colony
15	4929	Canal Katta, Arsapalli (East), Fruit Market
16	5227	Gurba Abadi, New Gunj, Labour Colony, Haricharan Basti, Shashtri Nagar
17	5144	Gautam Nagar, Kalur Rd
18	4456	Mubarak Nagar, Armoor Rd.
19	5194	Chandrashekar Colony, Maruti Nagar, Gangasthan Green Park
20	4810	Kanteshwar, Bank Colony, Yellamagutta (South)
21	5074	Yellamagutta (North) & Police Line
22	4762	Vinayak Nagar, Yedambhagam
23	5234	Hanuman Nagar, Vinayak Nagar (South), Yadgiri Bagh
24	5195	Sai Nagar (North), Gayatri Nagar (East), Padma Nagar
25	5111	Kotgalli
26	5197	Ashok Galli, Kotgalli (East), Qasab Galli, Bada Bazar (East), Surya Nagar, Chandrya Nagar (East)
27	4757	Renuka Nagar, Hanuman Nagar, Sitaram Nagar Colony (West)
28	4805	Gajulpet
29	4810	Malapalli (North), Mujahid Nagar (East), Shanti Nagar
30	5035	Auto Nagar, CM Rd, Sailani Nagar, Satish Nagar, Telephone Colony
31	5027	Auto Nagar, CM Rd, Shanti Nagar
32	5019	Bodhan Road, Habeeb Nagar, Islam Pura, Khoja Colony, NRI Colony
33	5116	Ashok Nagar, Islam Pura, Khoja Colony, Mirchi Compound, Yerukalawada
34	5187	Devi Road, Gandhi Chowk, Mirchi Compound, Nehru Park, RP Road
35	5220	Hamalwadi, Namdevwada, Pumpbowli
36	4984	Canal Latta, Hamalwadi, Namdevwada
37	5213	Ambedkar Colony, Pavan Nagar, Sanjeeviah Colony
38	4942	Adarsh Nagar, Ambedkar Colony, Harijanawada, Muslim Basti, Pavan Nagar, Shastri Nagar
39	5197	Ambedkar Colony, Canal Katta, Chandra Shekar Colony, Goutham Nagar, New NGOS Colony, Old NGOS Colony
40	5231	Canal Katta, Chandra Shekar Colony, Goutham Nagar, Housing Board Colony, Indira Priya Darshini Colony, Taraka Rama Nagar
41	5200	Chandra Shekar Colony, Goutham Nagar, Panchayat Raj Colony, Vasantha Nagar
42	5209	Chandrashekar Colony, Gangasthan, Maruthi Nagar
43	5233	Chandrashekar Colony, Hamalwadi, Pamula Basthi, Panchayat Raj Colony, Subash Nagar
44	4772	Old Collectorate, Dwaraka Nagar, Khaleelwadi, Pochamagally, Poosalagally, Saraswati Nagar
45	4928	Pragati Nagar, Sri Nagar Colony, Vinayaka Nagar, Yellammagutta
46	4802	Ashok Veedhi, Gol Hanuman Water Tank, Narsagoud Gally, Phulong
47	4787	Balaji Bhavan, Bobbili Veedhi, BoiGally, Gol Hanuman, Nagendra Temple, Narsigoud Gally, Phulong, Pusagally, Weekly Market
48	4945	Gol Hanuman, Jhandagally, Narsagoud Veedhi, Patigally, Phulong, Uppertekdi
49	5158	Arekatike Sangam, Arya Samaj, Ashok Veedhi, Kasabgally, Narsagoud Veedhi, Poosalagally, Uppertekdi
50	4970	Bhramapuri Colony, ITI Area, Shivaji Nagar
51	5044	Barkat Pura, Burudgally, Dharugally, Gajulpet
52	4813	Hajjam Colony, Hashmi Colony, Mammadevi Colony, Moghal Pura, Mohammedia Colony
53	4805	Hashmi Colony, Shanti Nagar
54	4748	Mujahid Nagar, Rahmat Nagar, Malapally
55	4795	Malapally, AhmedPura
56	4797	Ahmed Pura, Bodhan Road, Malapally
57	4798	Mustaid Pura, Ahmed Pura
58	4788	Barkat Pura, Dharu Gally, Line Gally
59	4920	Ahmed Pura, Qilla Road
60	4811	Ahmed Pura, Hajjam Colony, Hashmi Colony, Mohammedia Colony, Shanti Nagar
Total	3,07,099	Nizamabad MC

== See also ==
- Nizamabad Urban Development Authority
