= Nizamabad, Telangana =

Nizamabad Induru
- City
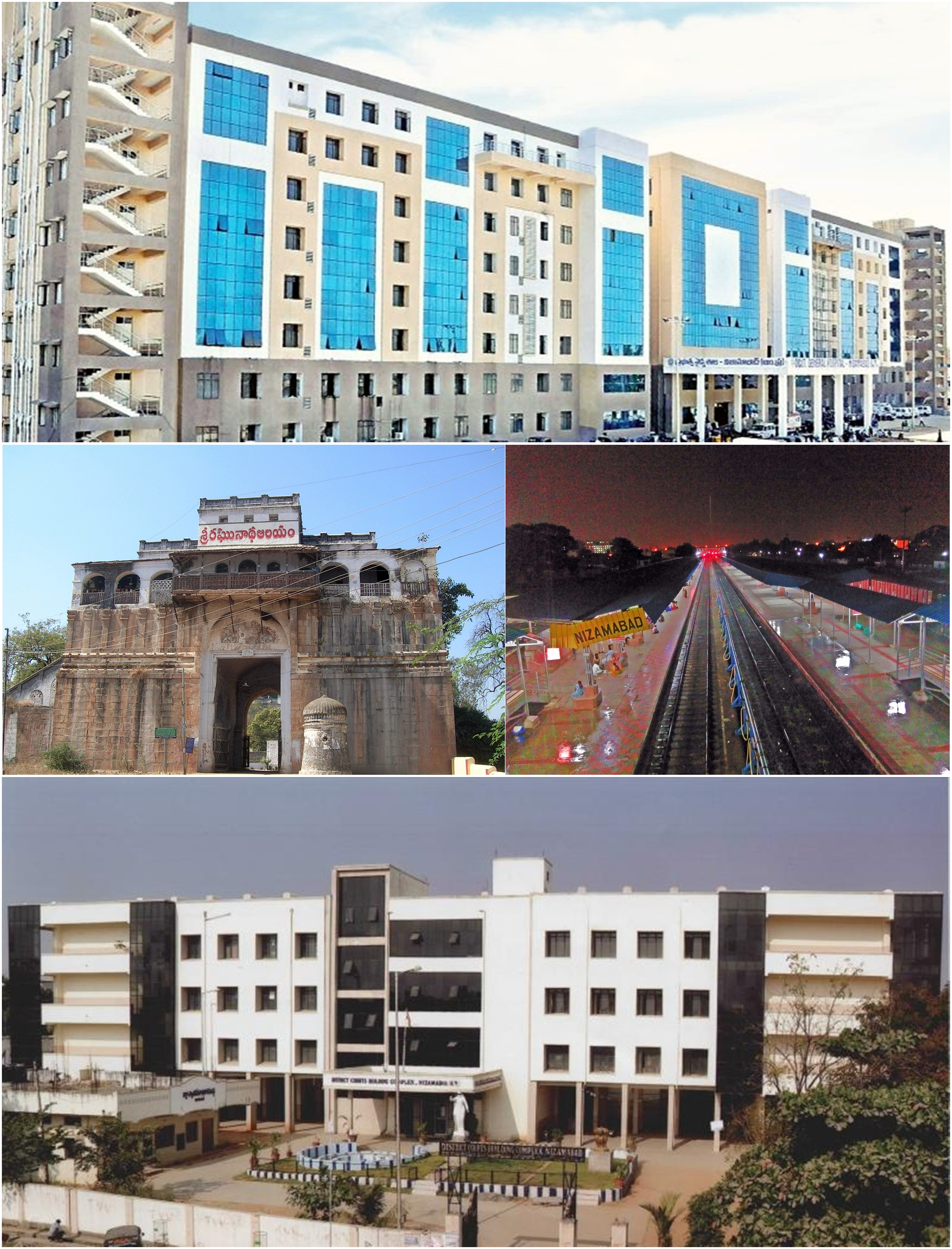
- Clockwise from top : District Government Hospital, Nizamabad Junction Railway Station, District Court and Nizamabad Fort
- Nickname(s): City of Nizams, City of Indra
- Location within Telangana Location within India
- Coordinates: 18.672°N 78.094°E
- Country: India
- State: Telangana
- Region: Deccan
- District: Nizamabad
- Founded: 5th Century
- Incorporated (Municipality): 1931; 95 years ago
- Incorporated (Corporation): 2005; 21 years ago
- Founder: Nizams

Government
  - Type: Municipal Corporation
  - Body: Nizamabad Municipal Corporation, Nizamabad Urban Development Authority
  - Mayor: Umararani

Area
  - City: 42.9 km^{2} (16.6 sq mi)
  - Nizamabad Urban Development Authority: 169.37 km^{2} (65.39 sq mi)
- Elevation: 395 m (1,296 ft)

Population (2011)
  - City: 311,152
  - Density: 7,250/km^{2} (18,800/sq mi)
  - Metro: 633,933
- Demonym: Nizamabadi

Languages
  - Official: Telugu, Urdu
- Time zone: UTC5:30 (IST)
- PIN: 503 001,002,003,186,230
- Telephone code: 91-846-
- Vehicle registration: TG 16 / AP25 (erstwhile)
- Sex ratio: 1001/1000 ♀/♂
- Literacy: 80.31%
- Lok Sabha: Nizamabad
- Vidhan Sabha: Nizamabad Urban; Nizamabad Rural
- Planning agency: Nizamabad Urban Development Authority
- Website: nizamabad.telangana.gov.in

Nizamabad, also informally known as Induru or Indur, is a city in the Indian state of Telangana. It is governed by the municipal corporation and is the headquarters of the Nizamabad district. Previously part of Hyderabad State and then Andhra Pradesh state, Nizamabad became a part of the newly formed state of Telangana under the Andhra Pradesh Reorganisation Act, 2014. It is located about 186 kilometres (116 mi) north of the state capital, Hyderabad.

== Etymology ==
Nizamabad was known by the name Indūru in olden times. During the 8th century, the town was under the reign of Indra Vallabha Panthya Vasrha Indra Som who belonged to the Rashtrakuta Dynasty.

Later, the place was named Nizamabad - after the title Niẓām ul-Mulk (Persian: نظام‌ الملک; lit. 'Administrator of the Realm'), bestowed upon Asaf Jah I when he was appointed Viceroy of the Deccan by the Mughal emperor Farrukhsiyar. The name is a portmanteau of Nizam, meaning "Nizam of Hyderabad", and abad, meaning "City" in Urdu. Sometimes, the place is also referred to as "The City of Nizams" (of the erstwhile Hyderabad State).

== History ==
Originally Nizamabad was called Induru. It was ruled by the king Indra Vallabha Panthya Varsha Indra Som, of the Rashtrakuta Dynasty, in the 8th century, and took its name from him. Nizamabad was ruled by the king Nizam in the 18th century, and was renamed in his honour.

During the prime minister-ship of Sir Salar Jung-I in the 1876, the districts in the Nizam’s dominion were reorganized whereupon Indur became a district.

Nizamabad was a part of princely State of Hyderabad in 1724 and continued to be part of the Nizam's dominions until 1948. After India gained independence in 1947, the Indian Armed Forces integrated Hyderabad and ended the rule of the Nizam in Operation Polo. It was during 1876 Nizamabad became a separate district when the districts in Hyderabad State were reorganized by Salar Jung-I, the then prime minister. In 1905 the railway line between Secunderabad and Manmad was laid. The city was named after Nizam Ali Khan, Asaf Jah II|Nizam Ali Khan the second Nizam of Hyderabad state. And during the reign of last Nizam, Nizam Sagar dam was constructed in 1923 across the Manjira River at the village of Achampet which irrigates 250,000 acres (1,000 km^{2}; 390 sq mi) of land in Nizamabad District.

== Geography ==
Nizamabad is located at 18°41′N 78°6′E. The city is bounded on the North by Nirmal, on the East by Jagtial and Karimnagar, on the South lies Kamareddy, and on the West it shares its boundaries with Nanded of Maharashtra state.

The city is administrated into 3 zones, Nizamabad North, Nizamabad South of Nizamabad Urban constituency and Nizamabad Rural of Nizamabad Rural constituency. The Nizamabad Municipal Corporation governs an area of 42.9 square kilometres (16.6 sq mi) under Nizamabad Urban which mainly comprises the suburbs of Nizamabad North and South mandals.

== Demographics ==
Historical population
Year	Pop.	±%
1901	12,871	—
1911	17,353	+34.8%
1921	15,672	−9.7%
1931	18,809	+20.0%
1941	32,741	+74.1%
1951	55,195	+68.6%
1961	79,093	+43.3%
1971	115,640	+46.2%
1981	183,061	+58.3%
1991	241,034	+31.7%
2001	288,722	+19.8%
2011	311,152	+7.8%

As of the 2011 India census, Nizamabad had a population of 311,152. Males constituted 49 percent of the population, and females constituted 51 percent.

Religions in Nizamabad M Corp (2011)
Religion	Percent
Hinduism	59.77%
Islam	38.01%
Christianity	1.13%
Other or not stated	1.09%

Hindus are 59.77%, Muslims are 38.01% and Christians 1.13%.

Nizamabad has an average literacy rate of 78.52 percent, higher than the national average of 74.04 percent; male literacy is 85.11 percent and female literacy is 72.02. In Nizamabad, 13 percent of the population is under six years of age.

Languages of Nizamabad M Corp (2011)
1. Telugu (53.9%)
2. Urdu (37.6%)
3. Marathi (4.25%)
4. Hindi (1.71%)
5. Others (2.52%)

The major languages spoken in the city are Telugu (53.90%) and Urdu (37.62%) and are also the official languages. Marathi and Hindi are spoken by 4.25% and 1.71% of the population.

== Climate ==
As the city is situated at a considerable distance from the coast, the climate is tropical savanna with most rainfall from June to October. In winter, there is less rainfall than in summer. In the month of May 2015, Nizamabad recorded 46.1 °C (115.0 °F) which was highest recorded temperature in Telangana during this summer. The temperature goes as low as 5 °C (41 °F) while the average is 18 °C (64 °F) during winter, while in summer the temperature rises as high as 47 °C (117 °F) and the average is 46 °C (115 °F). Average annual temperature is 27 °C (81 °F). The average annual rainfall is 1108 mm.

Climate data for Nizamabad (1991–2020, extremes 1907–2020)
Month	Jan	Feb	Mar	Apr	May	Jun	Jul	Aug	Sep	Oct	Nov	Dec	Year
Record high °C (°F)	37.0 (98.6)	40.6 (105.1)	43.3 (109.9)	46.8 (116.2)	47.3 (117.1)	46.3 (115.3)	40.0 (104.0)	39.0 (102.2)	39.0 (102.2)	38.9 (102.0)	37.0 (98.6)	36.4 (97.5)	47.3 (117.1)
Mean daily maximum °C (°F)	31.0 (87.8)	33.9 (93.0)	37.6 (99.7)	40.2 (104.4)	42.1 (107.8)	36.6 (97.9)	31.7 (89.1)	30.5 (86.9)	31.7 (89.1)	32.5 (90.5)	31.5 (88.7)	30.7 (87.3)	34.1 (93.4)
Mean daily minimum °C (°F)	13.6 (56.5)	17.3 (63.1)	22.0 (71.6)	25.6 (78.1)	28.3 (82.9)	26.2 (79.2)	24.3 (75.7)	23.7 (74.7)	23.6 (74.5)	21.6 (70.9)	16.9 (62.4)	13.0 (55.4)	21.8 (71.2)
Record low °C (°F)	4.6 (40.3)	6.1 (43.0)	11.0 (51.8)	12.8 (55.0)	16.0 (60.8)	14.0 (57.2)	13.6 (56.5)	14.0 (57.2)	14.8 (58.6)	8.4 (47.1)	7.0 (44.6)	4.2 (39.6)	4.2 (39.6)
Average rainfall mm (inches)	8.6 (0.34)	3.4 (0.13)	12.8 (0.50)	15.1 (0.59)	21.1 (0.83)	140.6 (5.54)	261.7 (10.30)	258.0 (10.16)	149.2 (5.87)	71.3 (2.81)	14.0 (0.55)	2.4 (0.09)	958.3 (37.73)
Average rainy days	0.7	0.4	1.0	1.3	1.8	8.4	13.6	13.0	7.9	3.9	0.8	0.2	53.1
Average relative humidity (%) (at 17:30 IST)	40	32	27	24	24	48	67	71	68	60	52	44	46
Source: India Meteorological Department

== Administration ==
=== Nizamabad Urban Development Authority ===
The Government of Telangana released a GO in 2017 setting up Nizamabad Urban Development Authority (NUDA) to develop Nizamabad Municipal Corporation and surrounding 60 villages situated in six mandals. NUDA with a geographical area of 169.37 square kilometres (65.39 sq mi) spreading across North, South and Rural mandals of the city sees over the infrastructure development and planning for the 633,933 residents under its jurisdiction. Currently Headed by Kesha Venu From Congress as a Chairman.

=== Municipal corporation ===
The Nizamabad Municipal Corporation is the municipal governing body of the city which consists of democratically elected members, headed by a mayor which administers the city's infrastructure, civic administration and water supply. Nizamabad Municipality was constituted in the year 1931 and upgraded as special grade Municipality in the year 1987 and as a Corporation on 5 March 2005 vide GO. No:109. The jurisdiction of the civic body is spread over an urbanized but dense area of 42.9 km^{2} (16.6 mi^{2}) and has 60 municipal wards.

=== E-Governance services ===
For providing facilities to the people the Government of Telangana started MeeSeva (At your service) centres all around the city and the state. The main purpose of this facility was to bring public services closer to home. MeeSeva provides online signed digital certificates like Income Certificates, Residence Certificates, Land Records and other Registration Records. These records are further stored online for database. Nizamabad along with Hyderabad are the only districts in the Telangana state which have their own Passport Seva Kendras, these offices carter the need of other districts of Telangana state.

=== Law and order ===
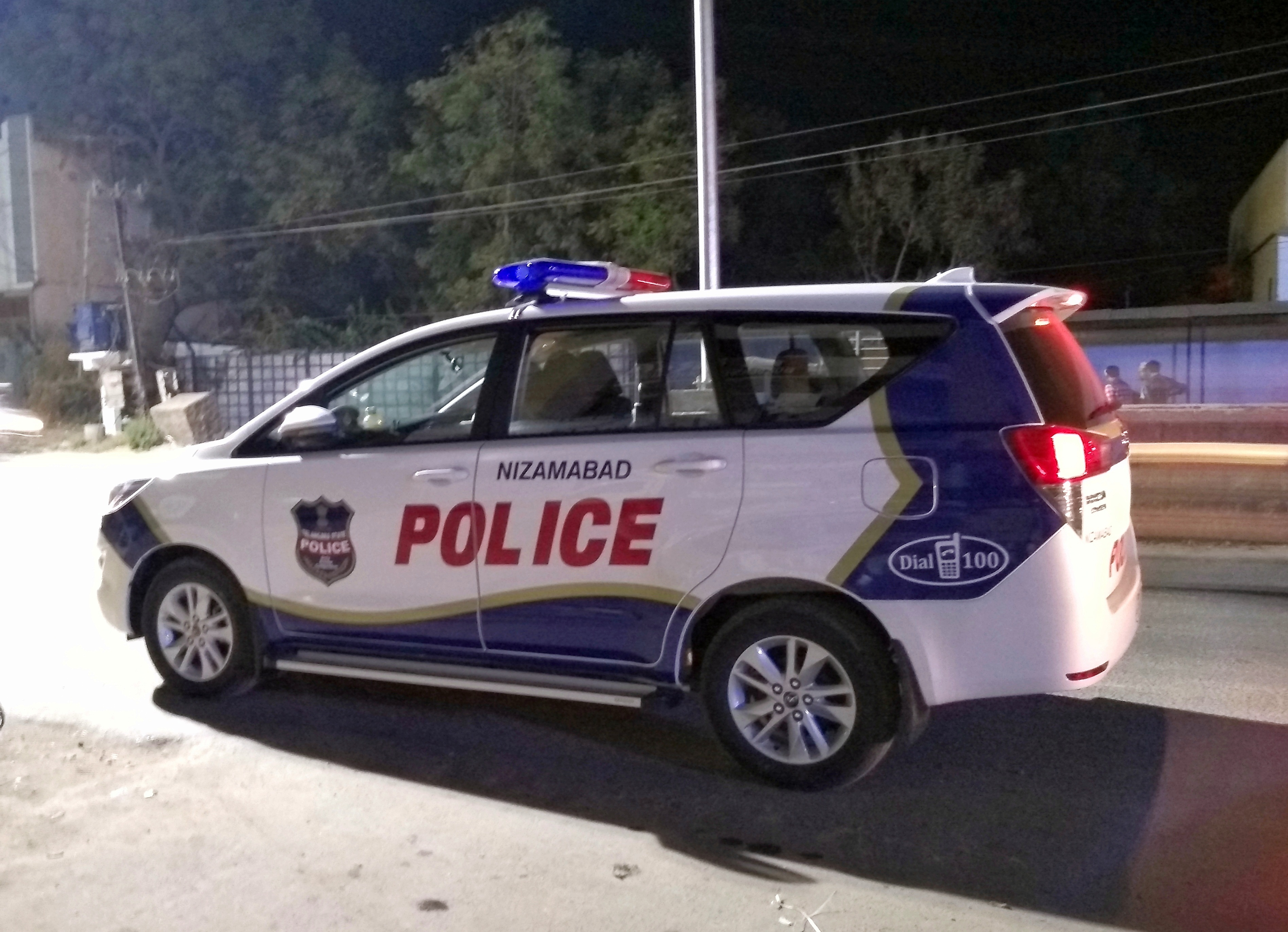
Nizamabad City Police SUV

The Nizamabad Police Commissionerate is the local law enforcement agency for the city and is headed by the Commissioner of Police. The city police traces its origins to 1847 under Hyderabad State. The city is under strict vigilance by the commissionerate as there are 72 CCTV cameras installed at various traffic junctions and the infrastructure includes Interceptor Vehicles, Online Presence and a large fleet of Mahindra Bolero SUVs. Apart from Crime branch, the police also has Traffic branch, SHE teams, Blue Colts and Mobile patrolling fleet.

=== Healthcare ===
Being the third largest city in the state, Nizamabad is known for its medical care in northern Telangana region. Government General Hospital is one of the largest government hospital in the state, also serving patients from the cities and neighbouring districts of Nanded and Adilabad. Khaleelwadi, also known as Doctor's Lane, is a densely hospital clustered area comprising more than 200 major private hospitals and many laboratories. Considering the better infrastructure and resources available, Government Medical College was established in 2012. There are speciality hospitals for maternity care, chest hospitals, Meghna Hospital for Dental care, Indur Cancer Hospital. Apart from these multi-speciality hospitals in the city, Pragati Hospital is one of the only hospitals among the neighbouring districts which has recently established a heart transplantation wing.

== Transport ==
=== Roadways ===
The city is well connected to the major destinations through various national and state highways. National Highway 44 bypasses the city, which is a major national highway connecting north and south India. The 460 km (290 mi) long National Highway 63, originates at Nizamabad and connects Jagadalpur of Chhattisgarh. The city corporation maintains roads of a total length of 772 km (480 mi), including of 387 km (240 mi) of surfaced and 385 km (239 mi) of unsurfaced roads. The Telangana State Road Transport Corporation operates buses to various destinations from Nizamabad bus station of the city. The city has 2 bus depots for storage and maintenance of buses.

=== Railways ===
Nizamabad Junction is administered under Hyderabad railway division of South Central Railway zone and is the convergence station for Nizamabad–Peddapalli section and Jankampet–Bodhan line with Kacheguda–Manmad section.

This Nizamabad–Peddapalli section connects Nizamabad with the Grand Trunk Route of New Delhi–Chennai main line and the distance from Nizamabad to Karimnagar and Warangal reduced to a large extent.

In 2023, the station was selected as part of the Amrit Bharat Station Scheme

=== Airway ===
Nizamabad currently doesn't have its own aerodrome however the state government of Telangana has proposed an airport at Jakranpally Mandal borders covering the lands of Manoharabad, Thorlikonda, Kolipak in Nizamabad. The nearest international facility is Rajiv Gandhi International Airport in Hyderabad located at a distance of 200 km, and a partly functional domestic airport is Shri Guru Gobind Singh Ji Airport located at 110 km in Nanded of Maharashtra State. The city houses 4 Helipads located each at Nagaram Stadium, Parade Grounds and two at Girraj Government College and 1 at Dichpally which is 15 km from Nizamabad district Headquarters.

== Economy ==
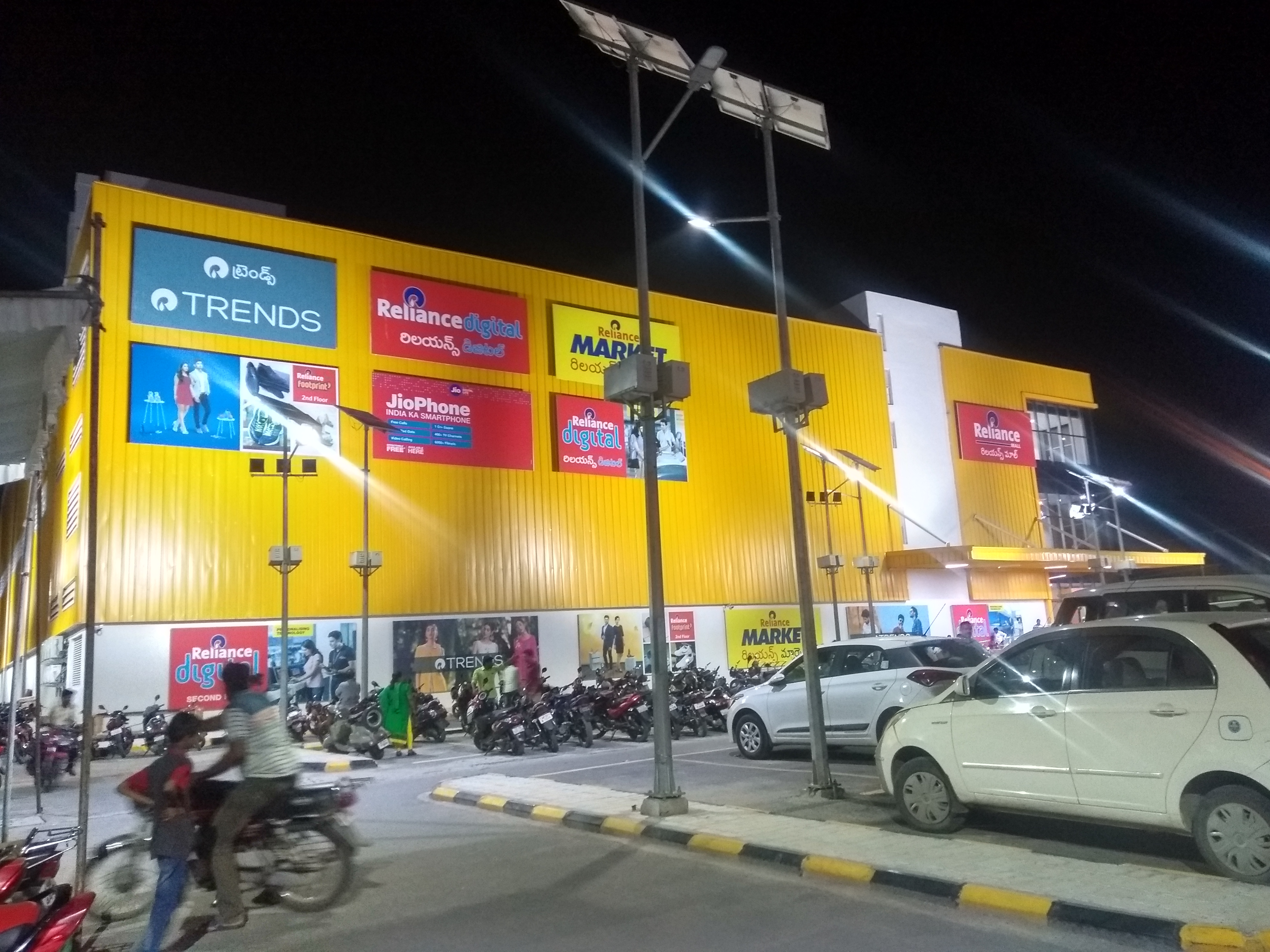
Reliance Retail Mall

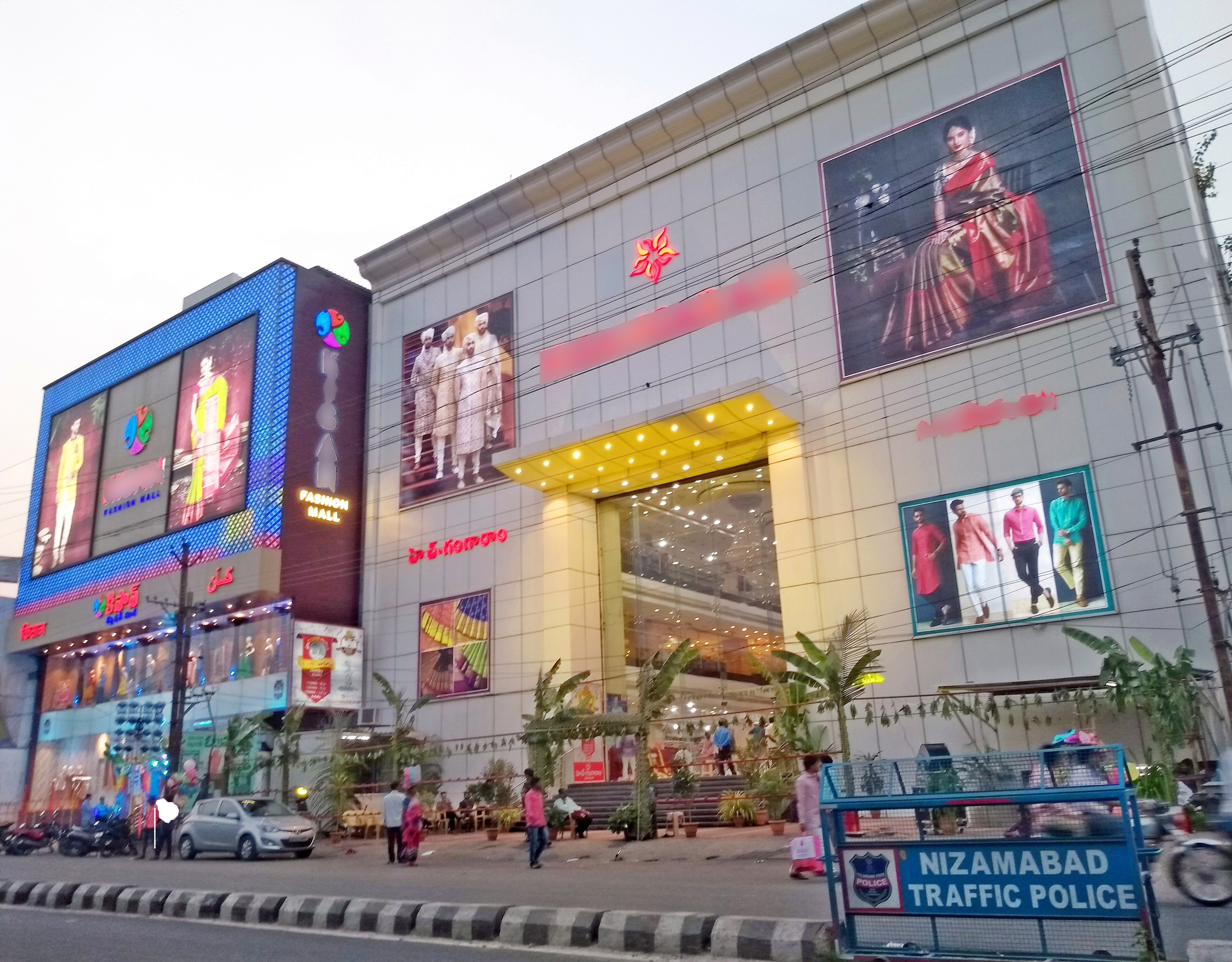
Shopping Malls on RP Road

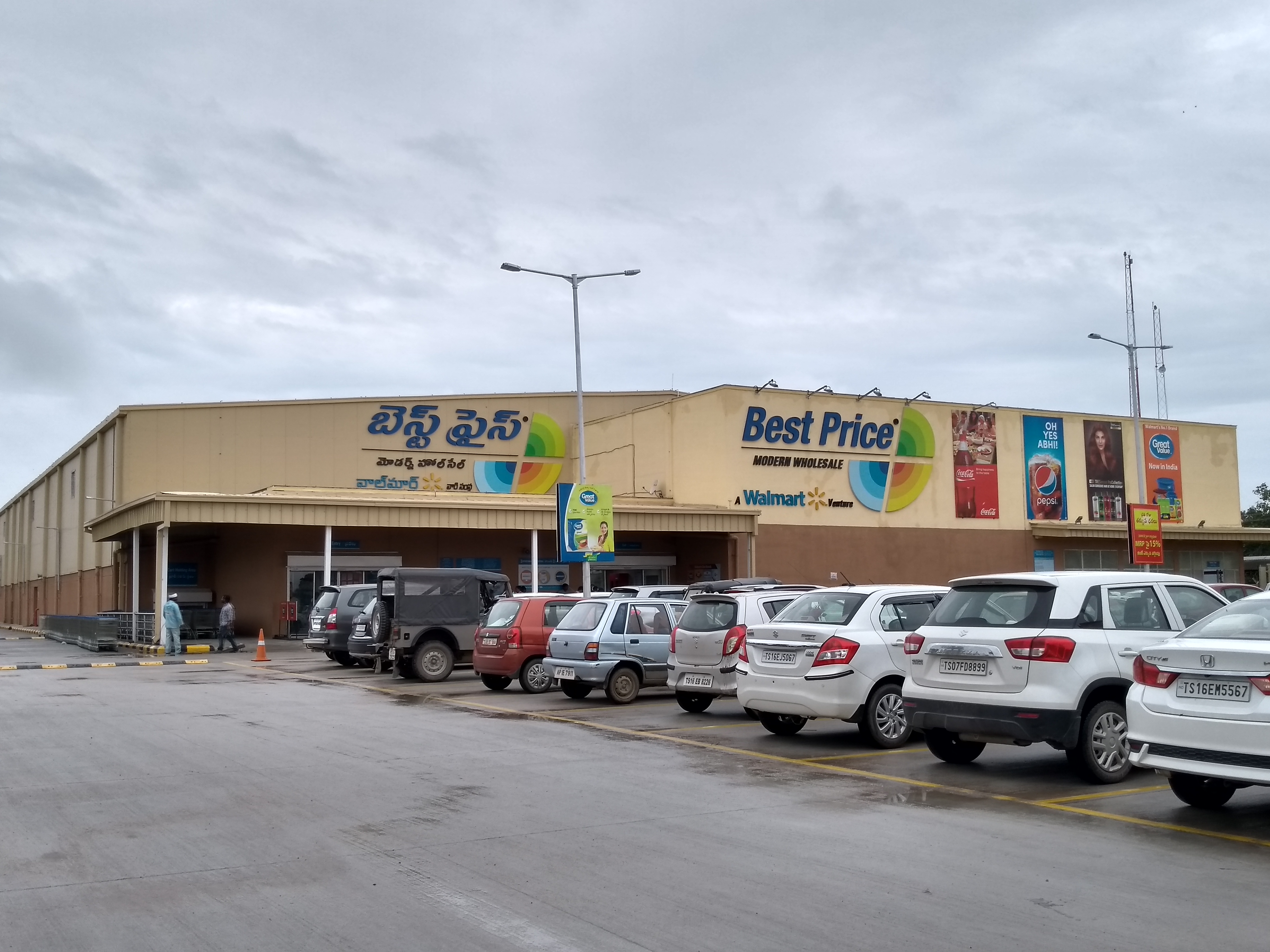
A Walmart store in Nizamabad

The economy of the city is largely based on industries and private businesses which are both under government and public sector. For most families the main source of income is either government jobs or family citizens working in Gulf countries. After the bifurcation of Andhra Pradesh and Telangana, with an initiative to develop the backward districts the state government has set up industrial parks in rural areas such as Sarangpur and Nehru Nagar.

Some of major industries include Nizam Sugar Factory which was the biggest sugar factory in Asia during the reign of Nizams, and major Spice Park. As Nizamabad is the largest producer of rice in the state there are many of Rice mills situated across the district and mostly in Khanapur region.

In 2018, with the aim of promoting establishment of IT industries in Tier-II cities, the state government of Telangana started the construction work of the proposed IT Tower and Incubation hub in the north part of the city. The IT Hub was inaugurated in August 2023.

=== Real estate ===
Real estate in Nizamabad is booming since a decade with large number of high rise apartments and commercial complexes. There has also been a large overgrowth around the city for some years.

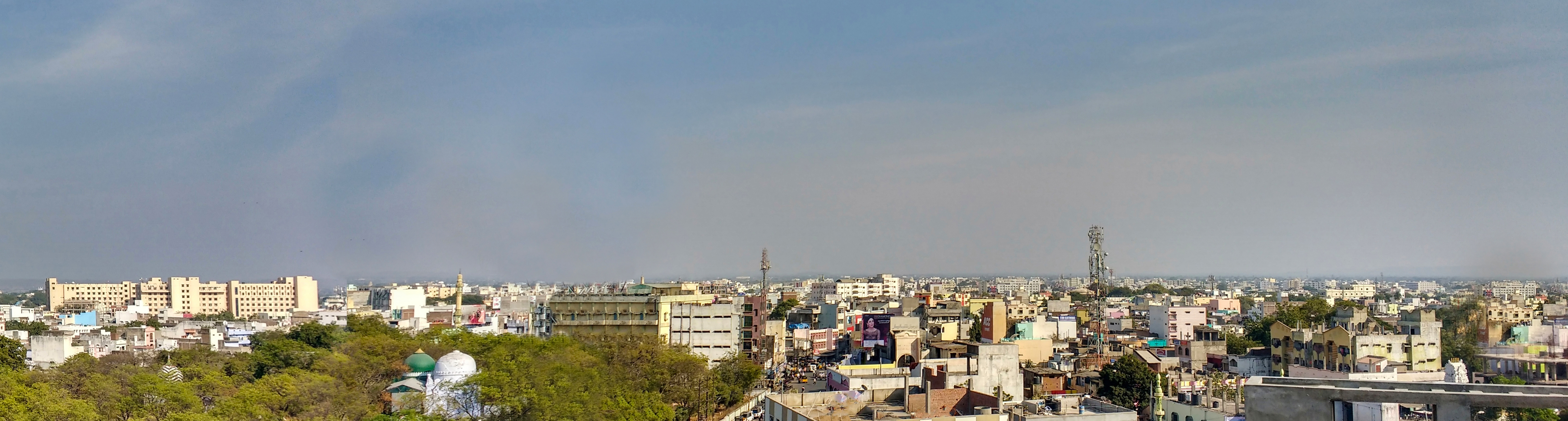
Skyline of Nizamabad overlooking East

== Culture ==
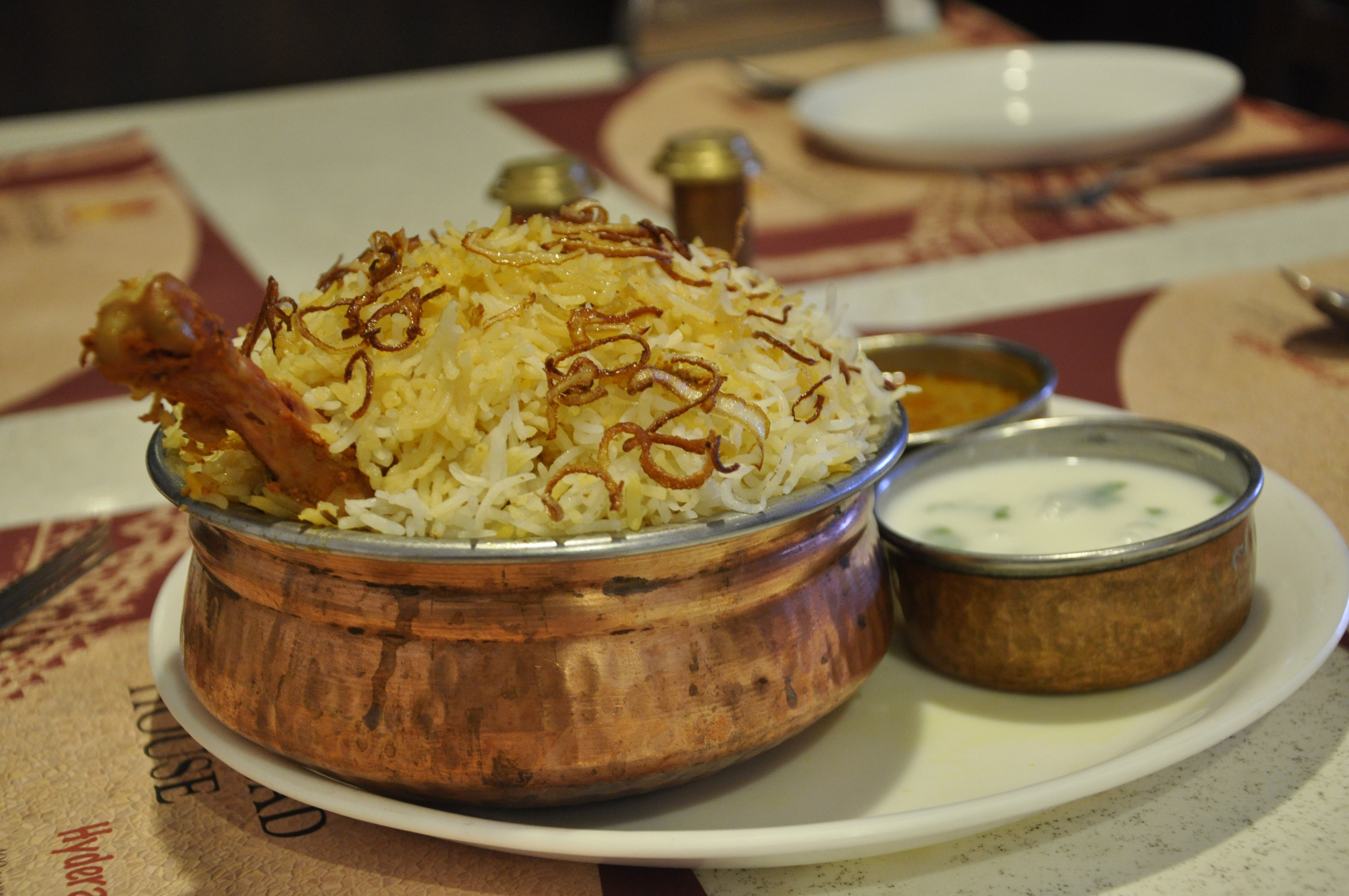
Biryani is the most served dish across the restaurants

Nizamabad's culture enriched under the patronage of Nizams. The city has a diverse culture with major proportion of city population being Hindus and Muslims and this mixing of religions has also resulted in many festivals being celebrated in Nizamabad such as Ganesh Chaturthi and Diwali of Hindu tradition and Eid ul-Fitr, Mawlid and Eid al-Adha by Muslims. Telugu and Urdu are major languages spoken by the city people, and English is also widely used for communication purpose. Even though the city has different religious communities, the people of Nizamabad are known for their harmony, cultural amalgamation and religious unity.

=== Cuisine ===
Nizamabadi cuisine mainly comprises rice, wheat and meat dishes. South Indian cuisine which include Dosa, Vada, Puri and Idly are common breakfast items. Hyderabadi biriyani with its blend of Mughlai and Arab influences and Tahari are other dishes. Traditional food items like Harees, Haleem and Nihari are common foods during Ramadan.

=== Tourism ===
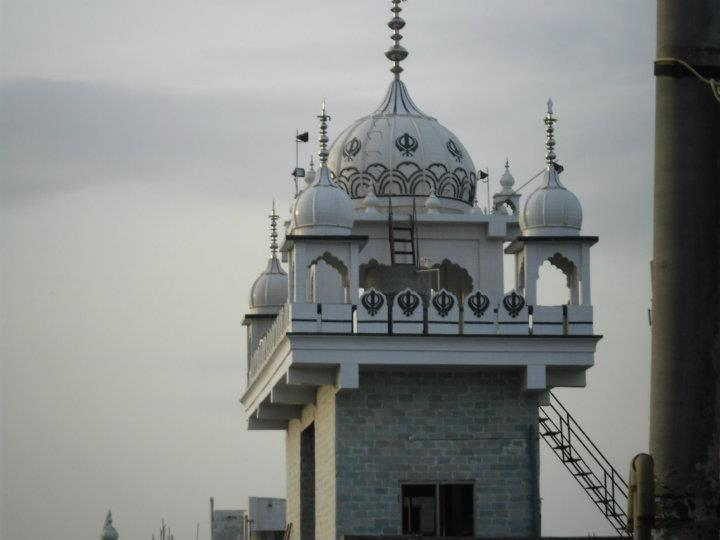
A Gurudwara in Nizamabad

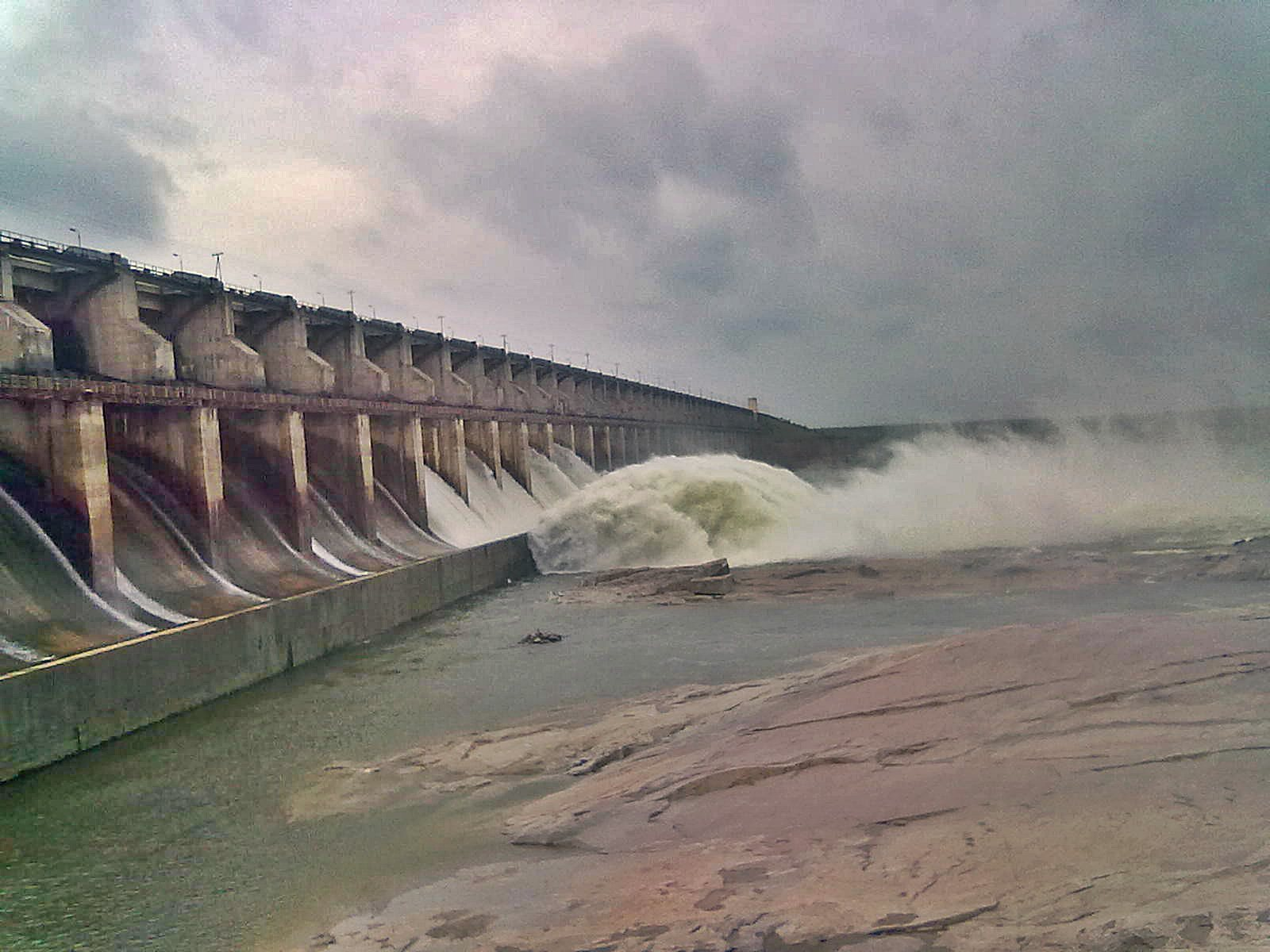
Sriram Sagar Project at Pochampahad

Nizamabad Fort is situated on the southwest of the city which was built by Rashtrakuta Kings in around the 10th century, the fort was captured by Asaf Jahis who were the Nizams of Hyderabad, who then rebuilt the fort. Archaeological and Heritage Museum was opened in October 2001 and is situated in the Tilak Garden premises which is opened seasonally. The Museum houses various artifacts and antiquities representing the evolution of human civilization from Paleolithic to Vijayanagara Empire (i.e. 16th. A.D). The Museum is divided into three sections, namely Archaeological Section, Sculptural gallery and Bronze and Decorative gallery. Bidri articles and arms and weapons of extensive variety are also exhibited.

Alisagar is a park and tourist attraction which is 13 km from Nizamabad and 2 km (1.2 mi) off the Nizamabad-Bodhan road. The garden is spread across 33 acres, with a deer park, trekking and water sports facility. It also has a hilltop guest house built by Nizam and is under renovation as of 2015. Ashok Sagar is a lake, park and tourist attraction situated in Jankampet area, 07 km from centre of the city. It has a rock garden with illuminated rocks and also has boating facilities. Neela Kanteshwar Temple is a temple dedicated to the Powerful Shiva (Mahadev) .The temple attracts a large number of devotees coming from different corners the state and the district. This famous temple was constructed for the Jains by the Satavahana king, Satakarni-II. The structure has a lot of resemblance with the North Indian Architectural style. The festival of Ratha sapthami is an annual event celebrated on a grand scale with a lot of pomp in this temple.

Dichpally killa Ramalayam temple was one of the oldest and kakatiya built architecture master piece on the hill top beside the Dichpally village lake, located at a distance of 15 km from Nizamabad district Headquarters and 5 km from NH44.

Badapahad dargah is one of the oldest Muslim pilgrim centres, built in the memory of Hazrat Syed Hussaini, on top of a hillock located at a distance of 38 km from the city.

== Education ==
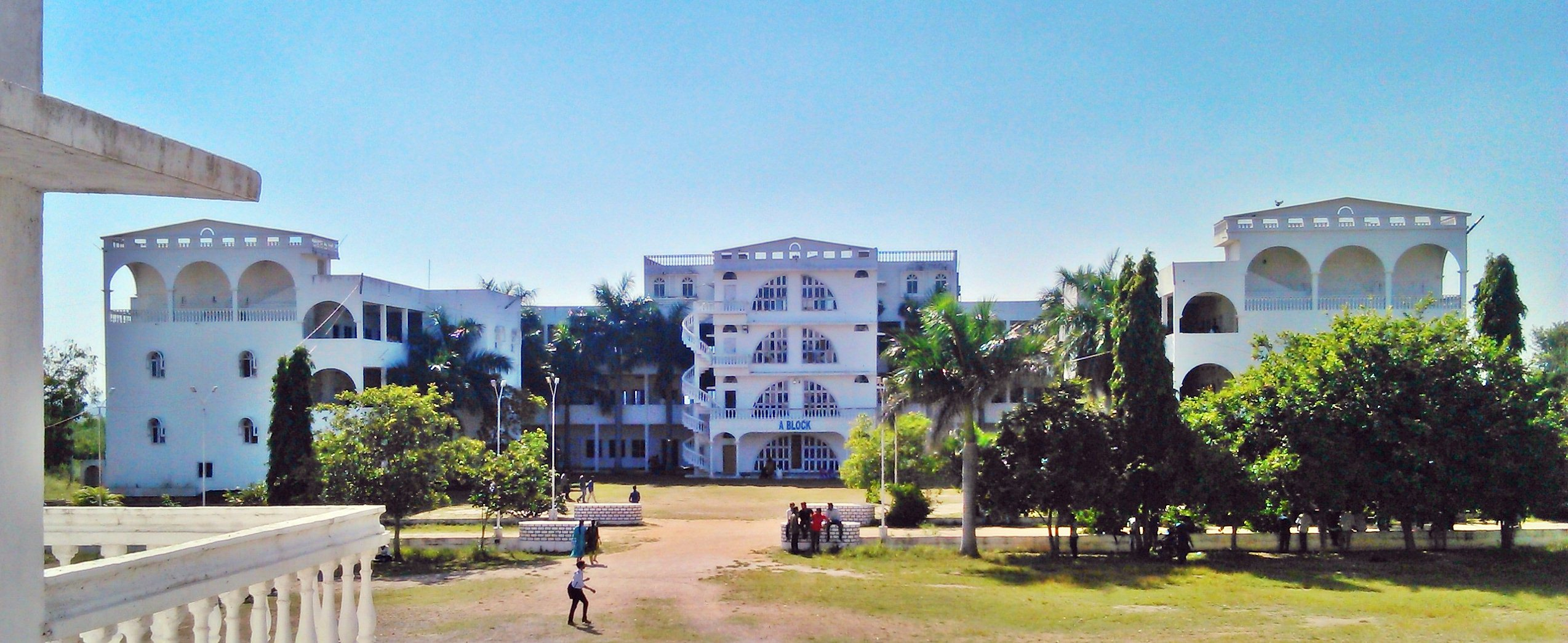
VREC, A Block, Nizamabad

Nizamabad is a major education centre in Telangana. The city is the home to 10 Engineering colleges, Vijay Rural Engineering College (VREC), affiliated to Jawaharlal Nehru Technological University, Hyderabad (JNTUH) is the reputed institution located in city. Kakatiya Institutions of Nizamabad is a group of well known schools & colleges in state of Telangana and the erstwhile Andhra Pradesh, as they have been constantly fetching state top ranks. Some other major educational institutions for higher education are Arkay College of Engineering and Technology, Kshatriya College of Engineering, Kakatiya Engineering College for Women, Ganga Pharmacy college, Government Medical College, Girraj Government Degree College Nishitha Degree College, etc. Many students from neighbouring districts of Nanded, Adilabad and Karimnagar take up admissions here for their higher education. Also 15 Model schools were established in the year 2013 by central government in EBBs, to uplift the education system & provide free education in English medium.

Telangana University is a public university under the Government of Telangana, located at Dichpally, 15 km from the city. Telangana University alone has 149 college affiliations of which 86 colleges are in Nizamabad and 63 colleges in Adilabad district. The university has also signed a memorandum of understanding (MoU) with Chicago State University of United States for exchange of students and teachers. The MoU was signed by the officials of the two universities in the presence of Chief Minister K.Chandrasekhar Rao.

== Notable people ==
For people from Nizamabad district, not the city itself, please see Nizamabad district

- Nithiin is an Indian film actor known for his works predominantly in Telugu cinema.
- Nikhat Zareen is an Indian boxer who won gold medals at international boxing tournaments.
- Sreemukhi is an Indian television anchor, host and actress
- Mohammad Hussamuddin is an Indian boxer who won bronze medal at the 2018 Commonwealth Games.
- Dil Raju is a film producer known for his works predominantly in Telugu cinema.

== See also ==
- Nizamabad mandal
