= Bodhan =

- Town
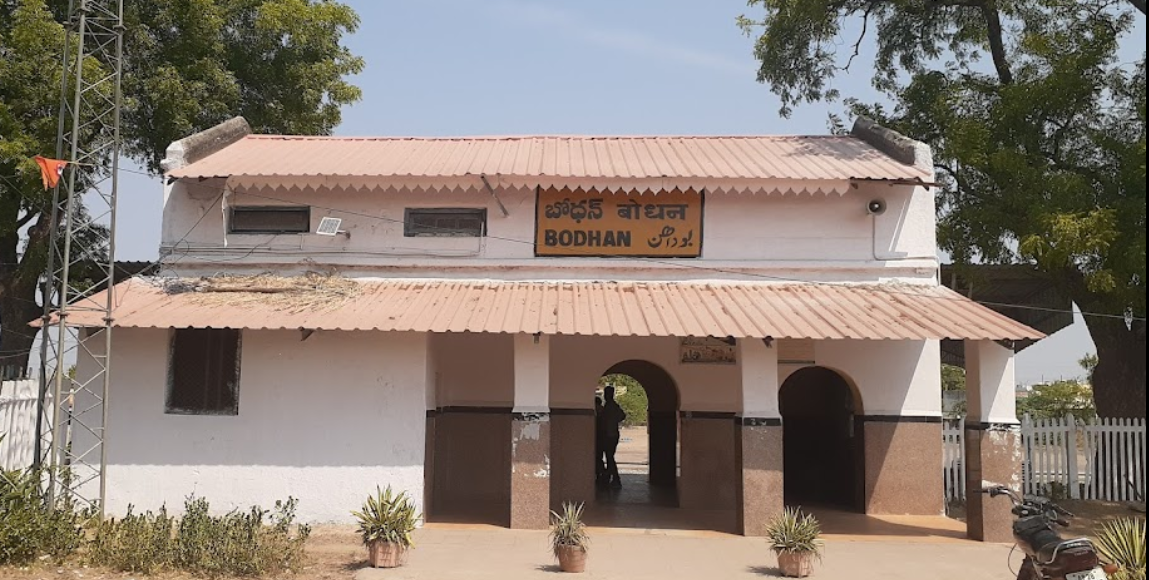

- Location in Telangana, India Bodhan (India)
- Coordinates: 18.67°N 77.9°E
- Country: India
- State: Telangana
- District: Nizamabad

Government
  - Type: State
  - Body: Municipality
  - MLA: P. Sudarshan Reddy

Area
  - Total: 35.40 km^{2} (13.67 sq mi)
- Elevation: 357 m (1,171 ft)

Population (2011)
  - Total: 77,553
  - Rank: 3rd in Nizamabad
  - Density: 2,191/km^{2} (5,674/sq mi)

Languages
  - Official: Telugu, Urdu
- Time zone: UTC+5:30 (IST)
- PIN: 503 185, 503 180
- Telephone code: +91 08467
- Vehicle registration: TG 16
- Website: bodhanmunicipality.telangana.gov.in

Bodhan is a historic town and municipal city in the Nizamabad district of Telangana, India. Located about 27 km west of Nizamabad city, Bodhan Town is known for its rich ancient and medieval history. The town, once called Podana or Podanapura, was an important center during the Satavahana dynasty and later served as a regional capital under the Rashtrakutas. Over the centuries, Bodhan came under the rule of the Chalukyas, Kakatiyas, Bahmani Sultans, Qutb Shahis, at last the Nizams of Hyderabad, leaving behind a blend of cultural and architectural heritage, The 7th Nizam built Asia's largest sugar factory during 1911-1948 has produced sugars in large volume and exported across the world and this is how trade evolved and many people used to be employed and became growing city in 20th Century.Today, Bodhan is a growing and culturally famous for the Sri Ekachakreshwara Temple, Buddhist relics, Sri Indranarayana Temple also known for 100 pillared temple and its role as a commercial hub in north Telangana. The Chakreshwara Shiva Temple, The Renuka Yellamma Temple, Bheemuni Gutta at Rakasipet, as well as other prominent historical places such as the Pandu Teertha (Pandavas dug lake during the exile to quench the thirst of villagers of Ekachakrapuram who helped them to stay and ) and Chakra Teertha was built for The Chakreshwara Swamy seva and served the village with fresh water till the beginning of 20th century.

== History ==
Bodhan is identified as the ancient Podana town (Podanapura), which was known to be the capital of the Asmaka Mahajanapadas of ancient India that covered present-day Andhra Pradesh, Telangana, and Maharashtra. It was also served as the capital of Vinayaditya, an 8th-century ruler of the Vemulavada Chalukya dynasty.

Rakasipet is a part of Bodhan and has historical significance. It is considered that the Pandavas stayed near Bodhan while doing Aranyavas. Bhima killed Bakasura near Rakasipet (Bodhan), and that place is now known as Bhimuni Gutta.

Amdapur, a gram panchayat located about 7 km from Bodhan, is historically associated with Bhimuni Gutta. The village is also known for its prominent temples, including the Shri Jagadjanani Mahakali Temple and the Shree Sai Baba Temple. The Shri Jagadjanani Mahakali Temple is regarded as a highly revered and powerful shrine. According to local belief, the unique depiction of Goddess Mahakali enshrined here exists in only one other temple—the Sri Ujjaini Mahakali Temple in Secunderabad.

Ancient Bhagawan Bahubali Gomateshwara ruled Bodhan Asmaka. He was the second son of Rishabhanatha, who was the first tirthankara in Jainism. Bodhan is believed to be the place of death of the dynasty's Kannada-language court poet Pampa. The samadhi (burial place) of Pampa is also believed to be located in Bodhan: it was discovered in the 1970s, when historian Yadagiri Rao deciphered a form of the old Kannada script. The samadhi is of an unidentified saint, who is believed to be Pampa.

Asia's second largest sugar factory is in Bodhan. According to historians, early Buddhism in South India spread through regions like Adilabad before entering Bodhan and further into the Deccan. Bodhan's location placed it along historic trade and religious routes that likely facilitated Buddhist influence.

== Demographics ==
Religion in Bodhan (2011)
Islam	50.06%
Hinduism	46.70%
Christianity	1.82%
Other or not stated	1.42%

As of 2011 India census, Bodhan had a population of 77,573. Males constitute 50% of the population, and females 50%. Bodhan has an average literacy rate of 66%, which is lower than the national average of 74.04%. The literacy rates for males and females are 71% and 61%, respectively. 11% of the population is under 6 years of age.

Languages of Bodhan (2011)
1. Urdu (50.3%)
2. Telugu (44.6%)
3. Marathi (2.12%)
4. Hindi (1.21%)
5. Others (1.75%)

At the time of the 2011 census, 50.30% of the population spoke Urdu, 44.62% Telugu, 2.12% Marathi and 1.21% Hindi as their first language.

== Revenue Division ==
Bodhan is one of the 68 revenue divisions of Telangana state. It consists of ten mandals, namely Bodhan, Varni, Chandur, Mosra, Rudrur, Kotagiri, Renjal, Saloora, Pothangal, and Yedapally. The entire division comes under ayacut of the Nizamsagar Project.

== Government and politics ==
Civic administration

Bodhan Municipality was constituted in 1952 and is classified as a second grade municipality with 38 election wards. The jurisdiction of the civic body is spread over an area of 21.40 km^{2} (8.26 mi^{2}).

Bodhan Assembly In 2014, Shakil Aamir Mohammed of TRS won the seat by a margin of 15,884 (10.37%). Shakil secured 44.02% of the total votes polled.

In the 2014 assembly elections, TRS led in the Bodhan Assembly segment of the Nizamabad Parliamentary/Lok Sabha constituency

In the 2018 assembly elections, Mr Shakil Aamir Mohammed won for the second time, representing the Bodhan constituency as a Member of Legislative Assembly with majority votes (74895). 47.14% With TRS (Telangana Rashtra Samithi) political Party, which was founded on 27 April 2001 by K Chandrashekar Rao, then-Chief Minister of Telangana.

== Transport ==
National Highway 63 passes through this town.

=== Roadway ===
Bodhan is well connected by roadways to major towns and cities of Telangana. The town lies on National Highway 63 NH 63, which provides direct connectivity to Nizamabad, Nanded (Maharashtra), and other nearby regions. Telangana State Road Transport Corporation TSRTC operates regular bus services from Bodhan to Hyderabad, Nizamabad, Kamareddy, Armoor, and other important destinations. Local auto-rickshaws and private vehicles are the primary means of intra-town transport.

=== Railway ===
Bodhan has a railway station and is on a branch line of the Peddapalli-Nizamabad line which provides it connectivity to Nizamabad.

In October 2023, the Karimnagar-Nizamabad MEMU was extended up to Bodhan.

=== Airway ===
The Domestic airport located at Nanded in Maharashtra (approximately 90–100 km from Bodhan), an international airport is RGIA (Rajiv Gandhi International Airport), Hyderabad, located about 210 km away, offering domestic and international connectivity, is another nearby option for the International and domestic flights.
