= Mhaimbhat =

Writer of the first biography in Marathi Language

- Died: c. 1300; Riddhapur
- Writing career
- Language: Marathi
- Genres: Biography, memoir
- Notable work: Leela Charitra

Mhaimbhat (c. 13th century) was one of the earliest followers of Chakradhar Swami and the Mahanubhava sect, and author of Leela Charitra, the first biography written in the Marathi language.

== Life ==
Mhaimbhat belonged to the Sarala village of the Ahmadnagar district of Maharashtra. He was born in a Brahman family and studied Sanskrit from his maternal uncle Ganapati Aapayo. Later, he went to Telangana for further studies. After returning to Maharashtra, he won debates against many scholars of Indian philosophy. He first met Chakradhar Swami on the insistence of his uncle, when he debated him at Domegram, and returned home influenced by him. Arriving at a decision to follow Chakradhar Swami, he went to Riddhapur where Govind Prabhu, guru of Chakradhar Swami, resided.

Mhaimbhat was married to Deaamba, the daughter of his uncle Ganapati Aapayo.

== Literary works ==
Mhaimbhat took upon himself the task of writing a memoir of Chakradhar Swami soon after the latter died. He traveled all over Maharashtra and collected anecdotes and life events related to Chakradhar Swami. With the help of Bhatobas, another disciple of the sect, he met a large number of people connected to Chakradhar Swami and collected material from various sources – often cross-checking the same story from more than one source to evaluate trustworthiness. This approach by Mhaimbhat is considered rather scientific, considering he was writing in 13th-century India.

Later in his life, Mhaimbhat also wrote Riddhapur Charitra, a biography of Govind Prabhu, another figurehead of the Mahanubhava sect. Along with these two biographies, he wrote ten aartis lyrical hymns in praise of God – which form a part of Mahanubhava rituals.

== Legacy ==
As an author of Leela Charitra, Mhaimbhat is considered to be the first known prose writer in the Marathi language. The language of Leela Charitra invokes some academic interest as it documents the language spoken by common Marathi people of the 13th century.
