= Ramtek =

Town in Maharashta, India

- Municipal council
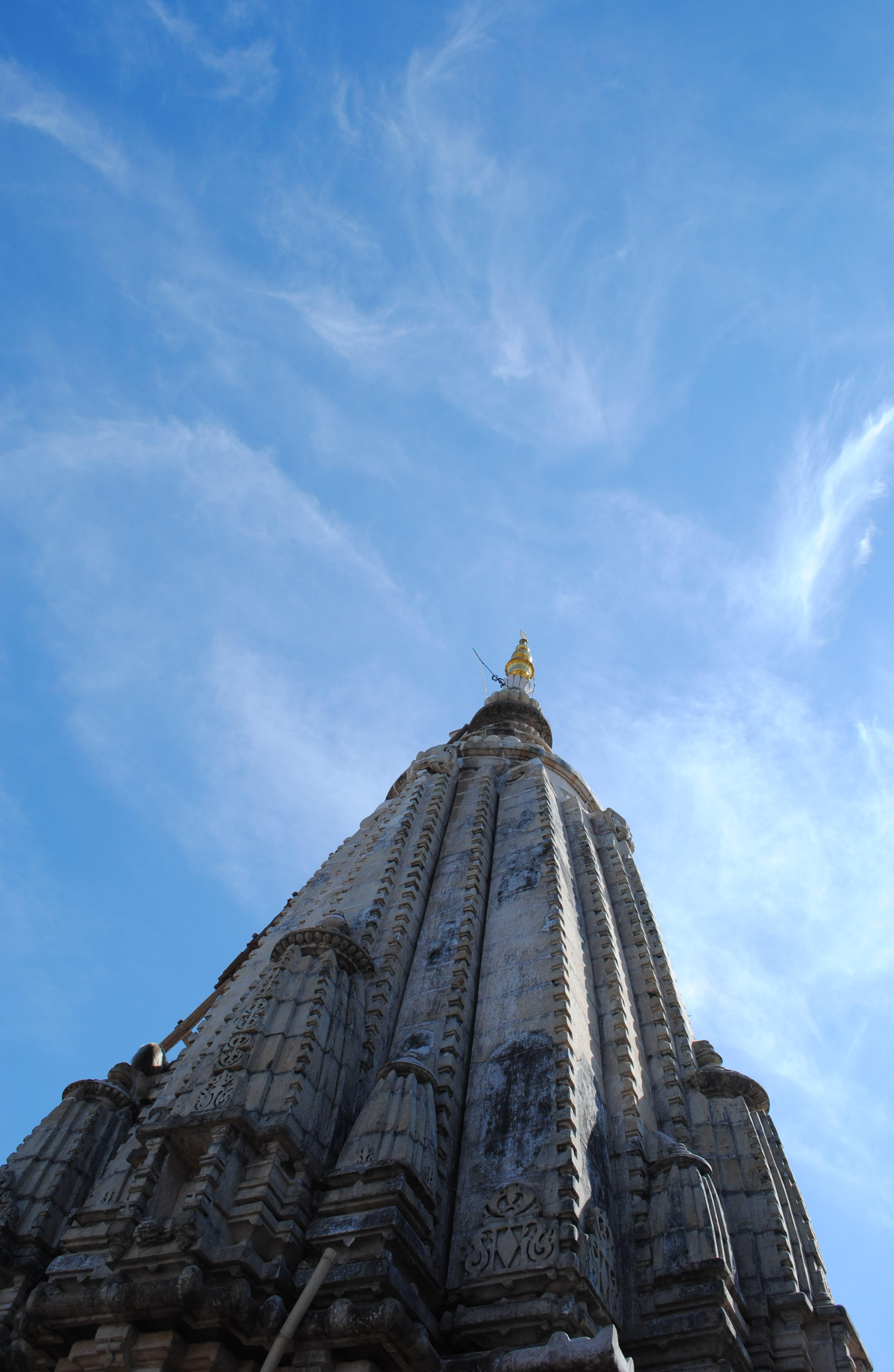
- Spire of Main Shrine - Ram Temple, Ramtek
- Interactive map of Ramtek
- Country: India
- State: Maharashtra
- District: Nagpur
- Named for: Rama

Government
  - Type: Municipal council
  - Body: Ramtek Municipal council
  - MP: Shyamkumar (Bablu) Barve.
  - MLA: Ashish Jaiswal

Area
  - Total: 3.54 km^{2} (1.37 sq mi)

Population (2011)
  - Total: 22,310
  - Density: 6,300/km^{2} (16,300/sq mi)

Language
  - Official: Marathi
- Pincode: 441106
- Website: Ramtek Municipal council

Ramtek (Rāmṭek) is a city and municipal council in Nagpur district of Maharashtra, India. Located at the foot of a prominent hill northeast of Nagpur, Ramtek is an important Hindu pilgrimage centre associated with the god Rama. Numerous shrines and temples have been built on Ramtek Hill since at least the early 5th century, when it served as the main religious sanctuary of the Vakataka dynasty. As of 2011, Ramtek had a population of 22,310, in 4,929 households.

== Names ==
Ramtek is first attested in a copper plate grant from the early 400s, during the reign of Prabhāvatīguptā, which mention the place as Rāmagiri and say that they were issued from there. It is later attested in an inscription from Ramtek, dated to the late 1200s, as Sindūragiri and Tapaṃgiri (for Tapogiri, "tapas hill"). The inscription says that the name Sindūragiri was given because the hill was stained red with the blood of the asura king Hiraṇyakaśipu when he was killed by Narasiṃha; according to Henry Cousens, the name Sindūragiri may have simply been because of the reddish colour of the rock and stone here. The name Tapogiri is stated in the Sindūragiri-māhātmya to be because this is where Śambūka was practicing tapas before he was killed by Rāma.

The modern name Rāmṭek means "the hill of Rāma".

== History ==
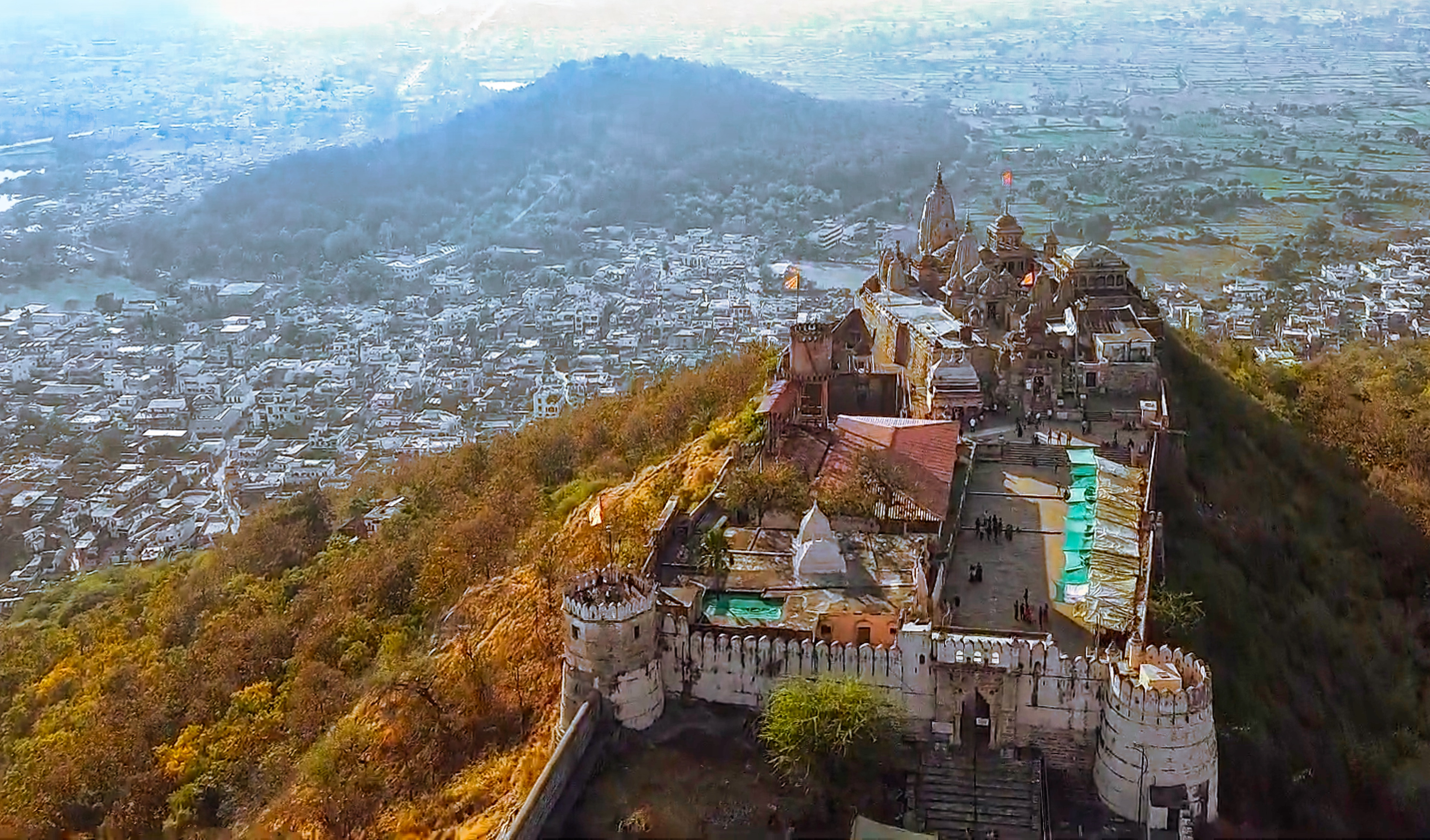
The main complex, consisting of the fortified citadel and the temples of Rama, Lakshmana, and Hanuman, is on the western spur of the hill, overlooking the town.

Ramtek has been a regionally-important religious site since at least the 5th century, and it was probably also a strategic centre controlling the highway connecting the northern Deccan with the central and eastern Ganges plain. It was about 6 km north of Nandivardhana, at present-day Nagardhan, which was the capital of the Vākāṭaka dynasty until the 440s. Ramtek itself was probably a locally venerated sacred site associated with Rāma even before the Vākāṭakas, but it was under the Vākāṭakas that Ramtek was built up into the main religious centre in their kingdom.

=== Classical period: development under the Vakatakas ===
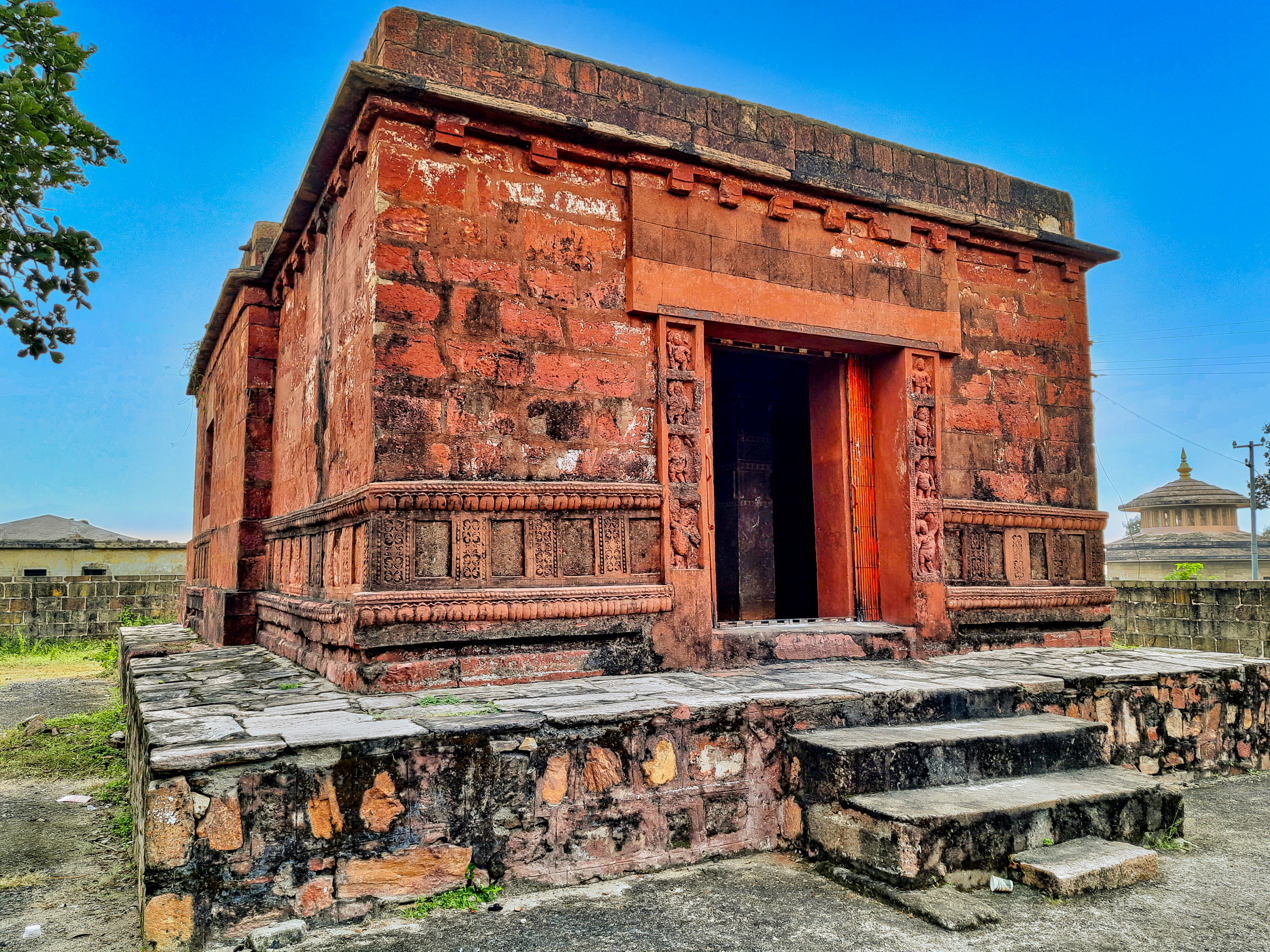
The 5th-century Kevala Narasimha temple is built of red sandstone and dedicated to Narasimha, Vishnu's man-lion avatar.

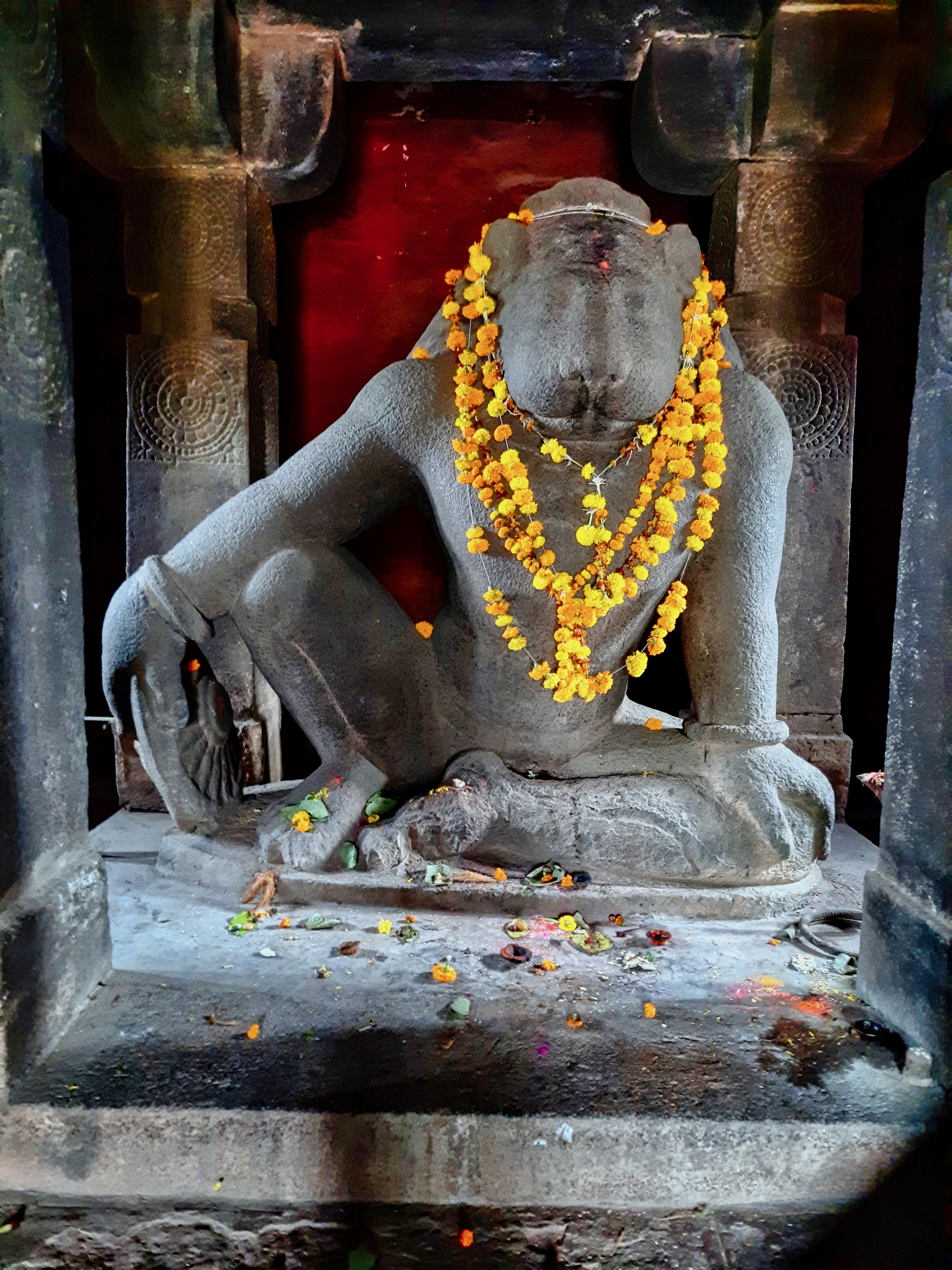
Narasiṃha is depicted in the Kevala Narasimha temple in a relaxed pose symbolic of royal authority. In his right hand he holds a chakra, another symbol of royal authority, and his right arm is propped up on his knee.

Vasudev Vishnu Mirashi has identified Ramtek with the Rāmagiri that features in Kālidāsa's Meghadūta, as the place where the yakṣa protagonist lives for a year after being banished from the city of Alakā. The Meghadūta describes Rāmagiri as being marked with Rāma's footprints — a description that parallels the grant of Prabhāvatīguptā, which says it was issued from "near the footprints of the lord of Rāmagiri". The identification of Ramtek with Kālidāsa's Rāmagiri has not been decisively proven, although Hans T. Bakker wrote regarding Mirashi's proposal that "of all possible candidates, Ramtek has the strongest claim".

Whether there was actually a sanctuary of Rāma on top of the hill during this period is disputed. Although Mirashi suggested that Ramtek was a centre of Rāma bhakti during this period, A. P. Jamkhedkar later wrote, based on more recent discoveries, that this idea should be "cautiously considered and probably rejected". However, Bakker suggested that a sanctuary of Rāma may have existed on the site of the present-day Rāma temple — the most prominent spot on the hill, on its western spur — during the Vākāṭaka period. However, worship of Narasiṃha was one of the most important features of the site in this period. Two other avatars of Viṣṇu, namely Vāmana and Varāha, also had temples during this period.

At least six still-extant temples were built during the Vākāṭaka period. Two are close-together red stone temples dedicated to Narasiṃha. Another is an open structure featuring an image of Varāha, Viṣṇu's boar avatar. A fourth temple depicts Vāmana but all that survive of it are the image (which is badly damaged) and part of the entrance. The fifth, and most impressive, of the Vākāṭaka-period temples at Ramtek is the Bhogarāma temple, located opposite the temple of Varāha and features two garbhagṛhas next to each others. It is mentioned in the Līḷācaritra and the Sthānapothī. Cakradhara, the founder of the Mahānubhāva sect, stayed at this temple for 10 months as a saṃnyāsin early in his religious career in the mid-1200s. These temples are all located along the route leading up to the main area on the west spur of the hill.

In building up Ramtek from a local cult site to "the primary religious centre of the Vakataka state", the Vākāṭakas were likely inspired at least partly by the Udayagiri Caves, which had already been built up as the Guptas' main religious sanctuary under Chandragupta II. Both Ramtek and Udayagiri appear to have featured Viṣṇupāda (footprints of Viṣṇu) shrines prominently, and both played similar role as royally-favoured religious sanctuaries, and the Vākāṭakas may have been trying to promote Ramtek as their big paramount Vaiṣṇava site to match the big paramount Gupta Vaiṣṇava site at Udayagiri. The connection between Rāmagiri and Udayagiri may have been a well-known allusion at the time, and Kālidāsa may have been alluding to this by having the eponymous cloud in the Meghadūta make the first leg of its journey from Rāmagiri to Udayagiri. (Note: Unlike Rāmagiri, Udayagiri is not mentioned by name in the Meghadūta, but most scholars today assume that the text's reference to a hill near Vidisha called Nicaih, with its Silavesma caves, is a reference to Udayagiri, which was in the suburbs of contemporary Vidisha.)

=== Early medieval period ===
Very little construction appears to have taken place Ramtek between the Vākāṭaka period and the Yādava period. The earliest appears to have been the stone Sindūravāpī tank, which has a maṇḍapa with pillars at its northern end stylistically similar to the Vākāṭaka style. The only other construction from Ramtek dated to this period is the Kalika Devi temple in Ramtek town, which Jamkhedkar dates to the 7th or 8th century.

Rāmagiri seems to have only been regionally important as a tīrtha during these earlier periods. In his History of Dharmaśāstra, Pandurang Vaman Kane notes only two major texts that mention Rāmagiri: the Meghadūta and the Garuḍa Purāṇa.

=== Yadavas of Devagiri ===
During the Yādava period, Ramtek again seems to have become a major royal religious centre, and there was a major wave of building activity. The basic structure of the main buildings within the citadel today, including the Rāma and Lakṣmaṇa temples, date from this period, although with later modifications. The Rāma and Lakṣmaṇa temples may have themselves been reconstructions of earlier temples, possibly from the Calukya period, with their vimānas "grafted upon an older groundplan". The Karpūravāpī tank complex on the northern side of the hill was built or rebuilt during this period. In the Lakṣmaṇa temple is an inscription from the reign of Rāmacandra, the last Yādava ruler (late 1200s). Although it is heavily damaged, this inscription "very valuable literary information" about the site. It appears to contain a māhātmya of Ramtek, which "begins by proclaiming that of all incarnations of Viṣṇu the foremost is Rāmacandra, who lives on the mountain together with Hanumat" and contains the story of Narasiṃha slaying Hiraṇyakaśipu, "whose blood gave the hill its red colour (sindūra) and its name 'Sindūragiri'". It also indicates that a shrine of the Aṣṭamātṛkās, or Eight Mothers, existed on the hill, although it is apparently no longer extant.

=== Maratha period ===
Ramtek as it exists today is heavily influenced by Raghuji I, the first raja of Nagpur (r. 1743–1755), who sponsored extensive construction projects here in the 1700s. Rāma was Raghuji's patron deity, and during Raghuji's reign in Nagpur, he made a pilgrimage to Ramtek every year as part of his court's "especially grand" celebration of Rāmanavamī. So it was only natural for Raghuji to sponsor extensive construction projects at Ramtek. He fortified the hilltop and renovated the temples of Rāma and Lakṣmaṇa (he seems to have kept the temples' appearance more or less the same as it was before, instead of substantially changing it). He also provided new idols for the temples of Rāma and Lakṣmaṇa. His munim (accountant) was responsible for the construction of the Jain temple complex at the northern foot of the hill, along with several temples around Ambālā Lake. Ambālā Lake in general was developed extensively under Raghuji and his successors, and most of the temples around the lake date from this period. The Sindūravāpī and Siteci Nhani tanks were also renovated during this period.

Ramtek remained an important dynastic religious centre under the later Bhonsles of Nagpur. For example, it influenced Raghuji's son Bimbaji, who created his own version, called Ramtekri, at Ratanpur when he was governor of Chhattisgarh.

Under Maratha patronage, Ramtek underwent a "third period of bloom". Besides the flurry of construction, there was production of religious literature. The Sindūragiri-māhātmya dates from this period: it probably represents "a new up-to-date recension" of older māhātmya texts that had probably been passed down locally over the preceding centuries. Bābū Mairāl, who was active as a writer in Ramtek during the late 1700s, is credited with authorship of the Sindūragiri-māhātmya, although he was almost certainly not the sole author, since multiple versions of the text exist.

Between the 1200s and the 1700s, a major shift in Hindu devotional trends had resulted in Rāma bhakti becoming one of the most popular worship practices in Hinduism. For example, a Rāma-centric strand of Vaiṣṇavism had emerged. This increased emphasis on Rāma made Ramtek, one of the oldest centres of Rāma worship, even more popular throughout India; it was now "a pilgrimage centre with an all-India appeal".

=== 19th century ===
Ramtek was constituted as a municipality in 1867 under British rule, making it the second-oldest municipality in Nagpur district, after Nagpur itself.

=== 20th century ===
Since Mirashi first presented his identification of Ramtek with Kālidāsa's Rāmagiri in 1959, the association of Ramtek with Kālidāsa has gained widespread popularity and led to the construction of the Kalidasa Memorial building on the hilltop. A festival is now held here annually in honour of Kālidāsa.

== Geography ==
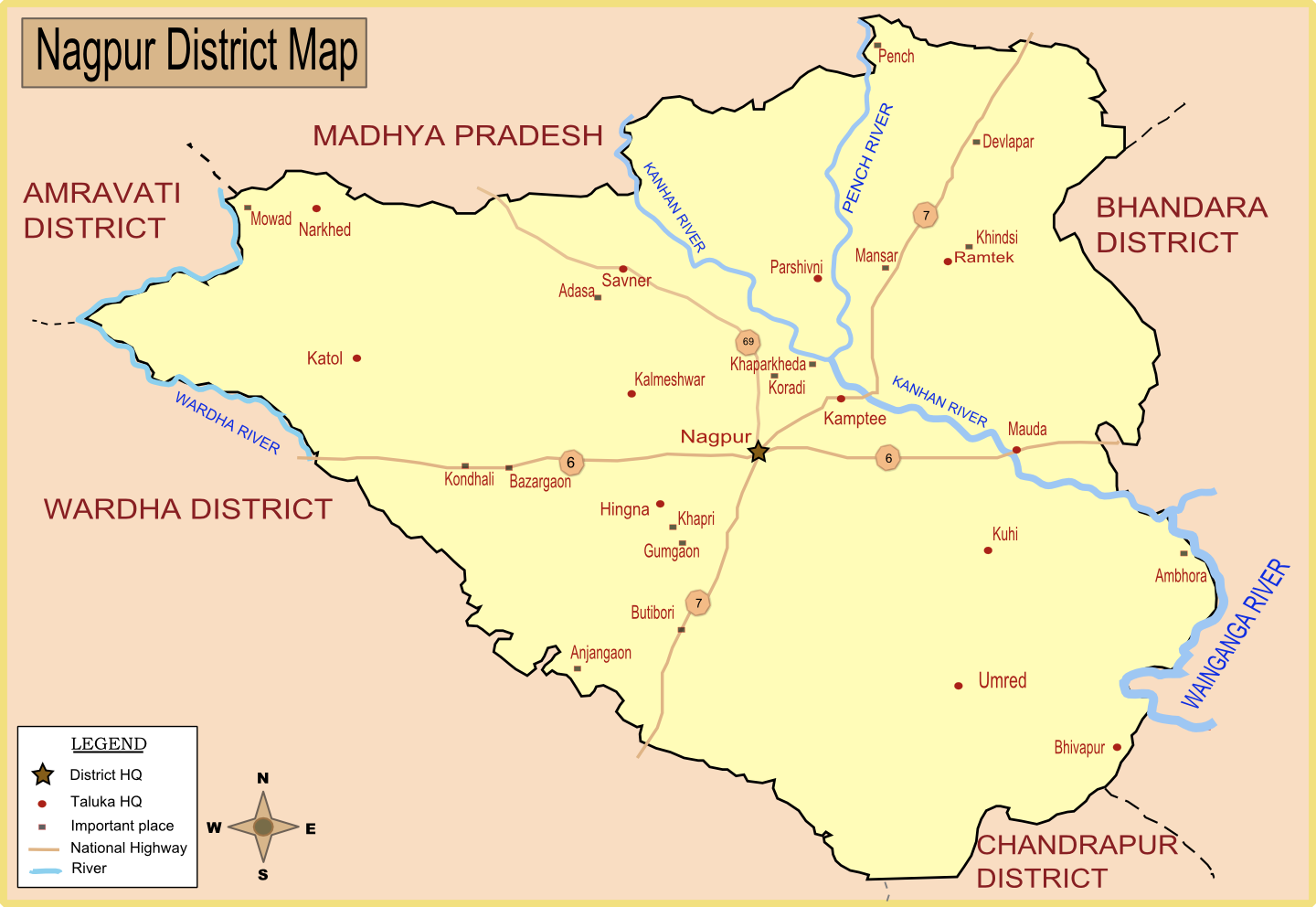
Map of Nagpur district with major towns(including Ramtek) and rivers.

Ramtek is located 45 km northeast of Nagpur, at the western end of the Ramtek hills, a well-wooded, horseshoe-shaped range that rises steeply from the surrounding plain. Partly encircled by the hills' "horseshoe" is a narrow valley containing Ambālā Lake, which is the starting point for the stairway leading up the hill to its western summit. At the highest point, a western spur rising to 469 m above sea level, is the main sanctuary, where the temple of Rāma is located. The Ramtek hills form the western extremity of the Ambāgaḍ range, which extends off to the east.

The town of Ramtek itself is spread out on the plain below the hills to the west and southwest. Another hill, lower and smaller than the Ramtek hill range, also rises on the west side of town, reaching about 406 m above sea level. Numerous large tanks exist around the town, especially on the south side; there are some 27 tanks in Ramtek in all, some of which are considered sacred.

About 7 km east-northeast of Ramtek is the vast Khindsi Lake, which is an artificial lake created by a 22 m-tall dam across a gorge on the Sūr river built between 1906 and 1914. The lake occupies an area of 36,930 hectares, and about 331 km of canals branch off from the lake to provide irrigation water for agriculture in the area.

To the north, south, and west of Ramtek are broad open plains that are mostly covered by farmland. About 3 km west of Ramtek is the town of Mansar, where there is another hill range to the north. North of Ramtek, the plains go north for several kilometres, covering the catchment area of the Sur Nadi, before running into a vast rugged forest region.

The municipal area is 3.54 km^{2}.

== Temples and other monuments ==
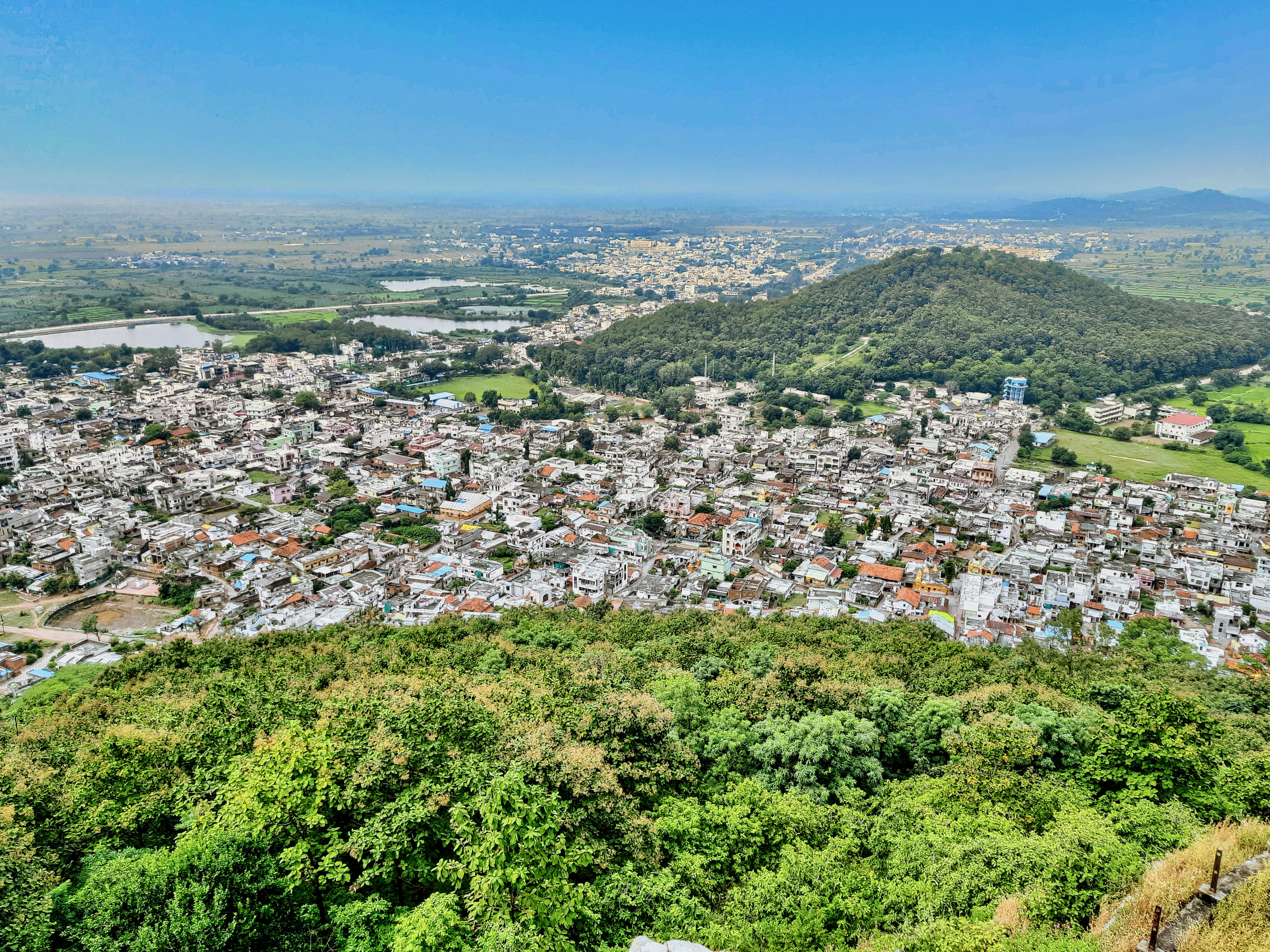
Another hilltop view of Ramtek, showing the town itself in more detail.

Ramtek is a good example of Indian architectural history as it is a site of continuous construction since at least the 5th century and no apparent cases of destruction, allowing a uniquely wide range of architectural periods to be represented at the same site.

The focal point of these monuments is the fortified western summit, where the temples of Rāma, Lakṣmaṇa, and Hanuman are located. Several other temples are located on the path up to the hilltop, and another cluster of temples is located around Ambālā Lake to the east.

Visitors to Ramtek Hill begin their ascent at the western end of Ambālā Lake, where a flight of steps leads uphill to the summit. From the citadel, another flight of steps leads down the hill's south face to the town below. The following overview of the monuments in Ramtek will follow this path: after beginning with Ambālā Lake, it will go over the monuments along the path to the top, and then, after reaching the top, will branch off to cover the various monuments elsewhere on the hill or below it in the town.

=== Ambala Lake ===
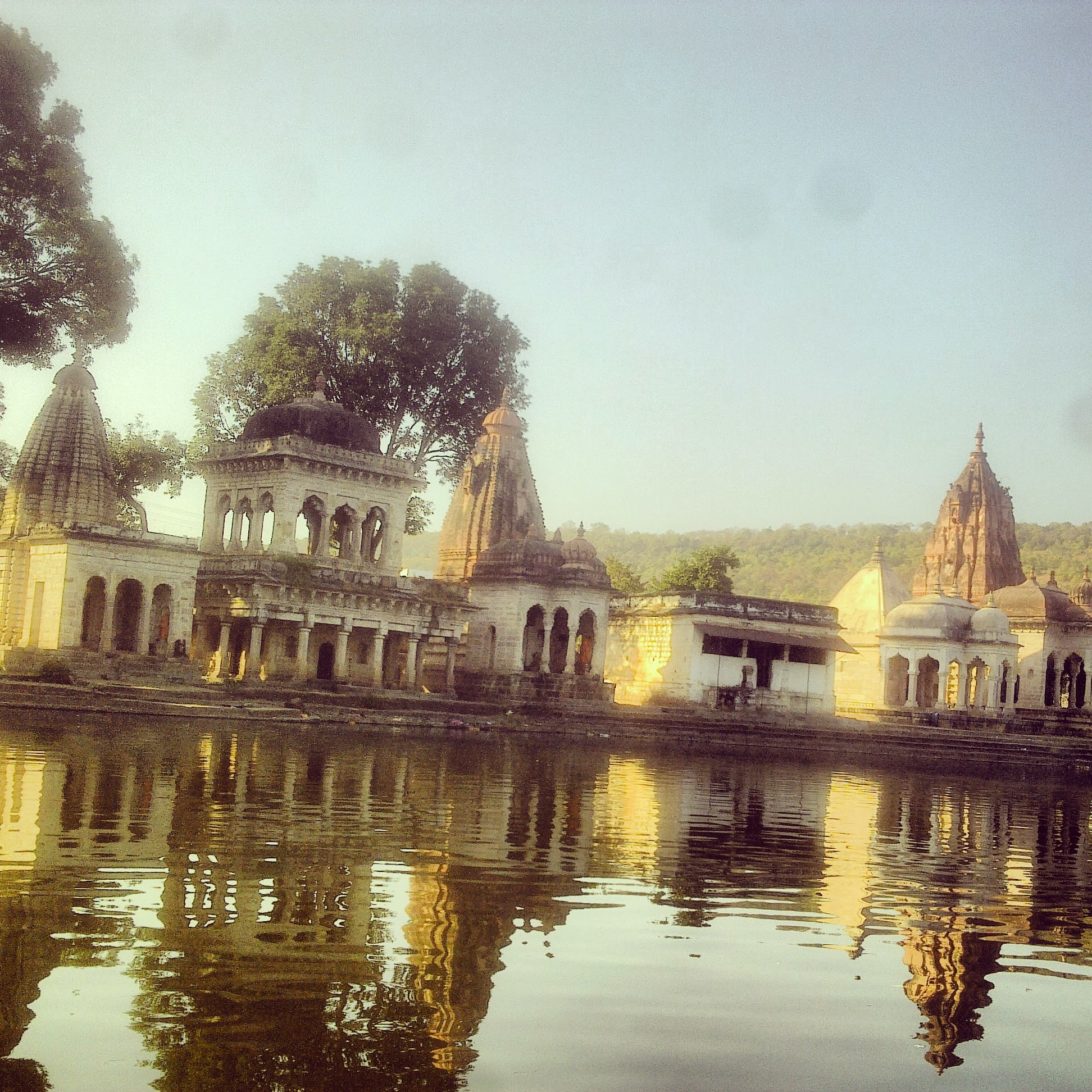
The waters of Ambala Lake are held to be as sacred as those of the Ganges. It is surrounded by numerous temples, which mostly date to the Maratha period.

East of the hilltop, in a valley partly encircled by the Ramtek hills, is a small lake (or tank) called Ambālā, which is lined with eight stone ghats and surrounded by temples that mostly date from the Maratha period. The water of Ambālā Lake is held to be as sacred as the water of the Gaṅgā, and for this reason, people come here to scatter the ashes of deceased loved ones. A whole area on the east side of the tank, called the Daśakriyā Ghāt, is set aside for this purpose: cremation and scattering ashes in the water. Each of the eight ghats is named after one of the Aṣṭamātṛkās.

On the southeastern side, there is an old ruined temple structure that has partly sunk into the lake. It is likely the 12th-century Ambikapati or Ambikanatha temple mentioned in the late-13th-century inscription from the Lakṣmaṇa temple. It has a vimāna as well as a double āmalaka.

From the western end of Ambālā Lake, there is a series of stairs leading up the hill to the top. The initial flight of stairs leads to the Narasimha temples, the Dhumreshwar Mahadev temple, a mosque, and an old tank with a dharamshala, before leading to the outermost gate of the citadel — the Varaha Darwaza.

=== Kevala Narasimha temple ===
The Kevala Narasimha temple is dated to the first half of the 500s CE. It may have been built by Camuṇḍā, a daughter of Prabhāvatīguptā, in commemoration of her mother. The structure itself consists of a garbhagṛha with a maṇḍapa in front. Neither has a śikhara, and the whole building has a flat roof. (Note: Quoted in Bakker, The Antiquities of Ramtek Hill, p. 82) The whole structure is set on top of a platform that actually seems to be a later reconstruction enclosing and hiding the original pīṭha. The garbhagṛha and maṇḍapa each contain a four-pillared pavilion (catuṣkī). The garbhagṛha pavilion is surrounded by a circumambulatory path, which makes the Kevala Narasimha temple one of the oldest known examples of a sāndhāra-style temple. In front of the garbhagṛha itself are two elaborately decorated red sandstone pillars. Light in the garbhagṛha is provided by two windows, one on the north wall and the other on the south, each with two pillars and two pilasters.

The image of Narasimha himself is carved from black basalt stone, contrasting with the red sandstone walls. Narasimha is depicted with two arms here and is seated in the mahārājali-lāsana pose — "the relaxed, gentle but sovereign pose of a king" — with his right knee pulled up to support his right arm. In his right arm is a cakra, which symbolizes his royal power and dignity. He is depicted wearing nothing but a loincloth, an udarabandha (band around the belly), and a necklace and bracelets. Instead of a crown, he is depicted with a "rosette-like decoration" which is also seen in some sculptures at Ajanta and Mandhal.

=== Rudra Narasimha temple ===
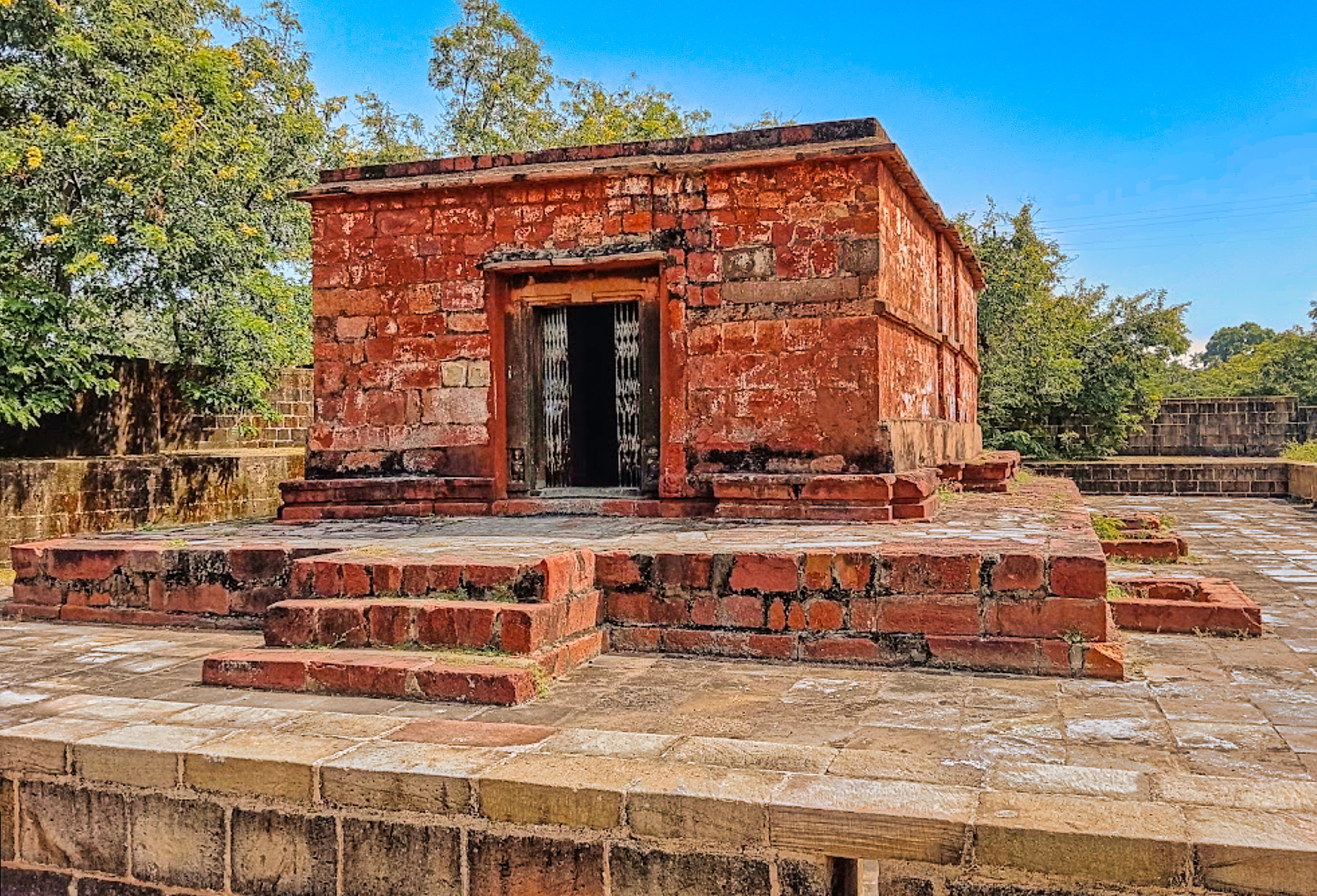
The Rudra Narasimha temple is similar in style to the Kevala Narasimha temple, and is probably slightly older.

About 100 m north of the Kevala Narasimha temple is a similar structure known locally as the Rudra Narasimha temple. It is somewhat smaller than the Kevala Narasimha temple, and somewhat simpler overall, with no windows, less elaborate decoration, and "less refined workmanship". Based on this, it may have been built earlier than the Kevala Narasimha temple. Along the outer walls of the Rudra Narasimha temple is a series of pedestals that may have once had statues of digpalas on them; a couple of fragments of these statues were found nearby and are now stored in the Nagpur Central Museum. Below the pedestals, and apparently corresponding to them, is a series of square pits whose function is unknown but which may have perhaps served as fire pits.

=== Dhumreshwar Mahadev temple ===
Opposite the two Narasimha temples is the Dhumreshwar Mahadev temple, where the ascetic Śambūka is worshipped in the form of a linga. The legend is that Śambūka, a śūdra of humble birth, practiced tapas here and accidentally caused a brahmin's son to die young. Rāma came and killed Śambūka as punishment, but after Śambūka prayed to him, Rāma agreed to make his own home at Ramtek and turn Śambūka into a linga so that Śambūka could himself be worshipped. The Dhumreshwar Mahadev temple is supposed to be built around this linga. This whole episode is considered the reason why Ramtek Hill is seen as the abode of Rāma, which in turn is why it is considered a sacred site.

=== Mosque of Aurangzeb's courtier ===
In the same area as the Dhumreshwar Mahadev and Narasimha temples is a plain mosque which is supposed to have been built in memory of one of Aurangzeb's courtiers. From here, the second set of steps leads up to the Varaha Darwaza.

=== Sinduravapi tank ===
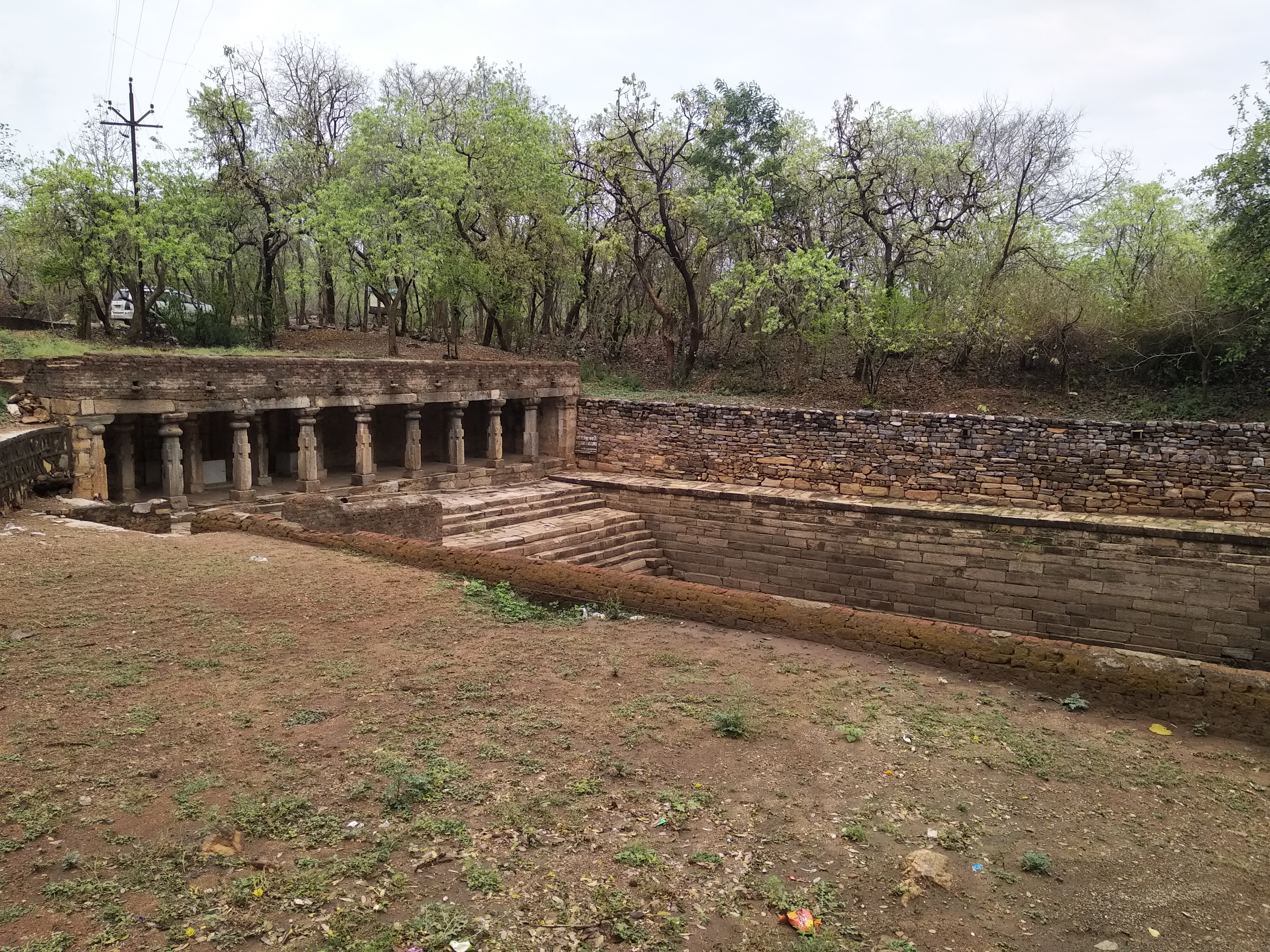
The Sinduravapi tank, with a pillared mandapa on its northern side, may have been originally built in the post-Vakataka period and was apparently renovated during the Maratha period.

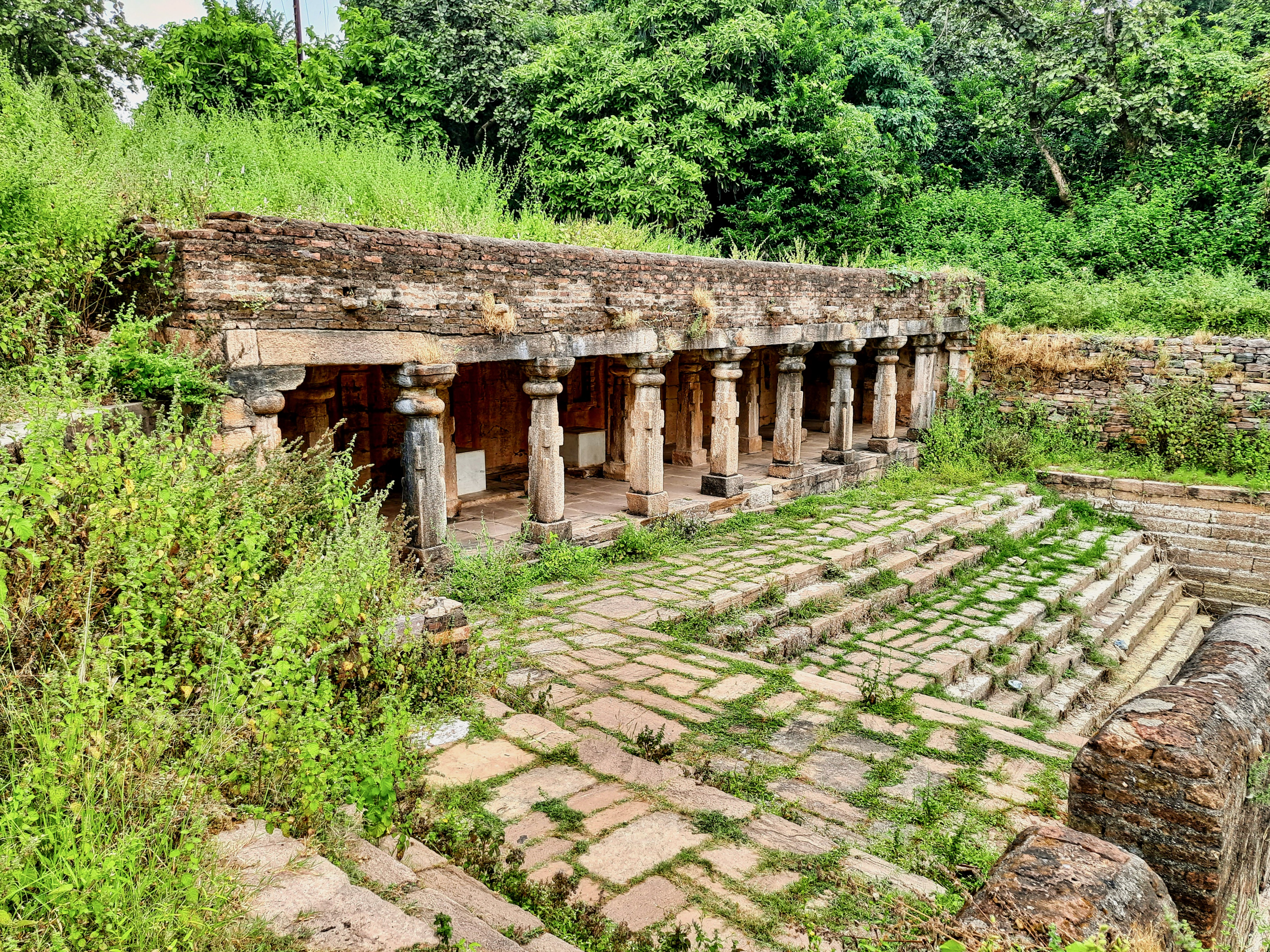
Another view of the Sinduravapi tank's mandapa

Just outside the Varaha Darwaza is the Sindūravāpī tank. The maṇḍapa at the northern end stylistically resembles Vakataka architecture, although the entrance gate and the steps leading to the water appear to be later renovations.

=== Varaha Darwaza and shrine of Varaha ===
A bit uphill from the two Narasimha temples is the Varaha Darwaza, which is the outermost gate of the citadel. On the other side of the gate is the "fourth court" of the citadel, where there is a pavilion over a 2 m-tall sculpted image of Varāha, Viṣṇu's boar avatar. This pavilion may have once formed part of the inner sanctum of a full temple, like the pavilions in the garbhagṛhas of the Narasimha temples. Its date relative to the Narasimha temples is unknown, but it was probably built in the first half of the 5th century.

Today, pilgrims to Ramtek try to slide under Varāha's belly; if they are unsuccessful, it is considered a sign of past sinful conduct.

=== Bhogarama temple ===
West of the Varaha shrine is the Bhogarāma temple, which belongs to the Mahānubhāvas. Described by Bakker as a "masterpiece of Vakataka architecture", the Bhogarāma temple features a two different garbhagṛhas that are both accessed through the same vestibule (antarāla). A six-pillared portico frames the front of the temple, which is surrounded by its own walled courtyard. Based on the two garbhagṛhas, Bakker suggested that the Bhogarāma temple was originally dedicated to the divine pair Vāsudeva and Saṃkarṣaṇa, who were later identified with Kṛṣṇa and Balarāma. Jamkhedkar and Bakker both agreed that the Bhogarāma temple represents a later, more elaborate continuation of the simple rectangular temples of Narasimha and Varaha, and thus was probably built later. Bakker suggested a date of either the second half of the 5th century or in the early 6th century.

The Bhogarāma temple was completely renovated by the Mahānubhāvas for their 700th-anniversary celebration in honour of Chakradhara. (Note: Quoted in Bakker, The Antiquities of Ramtek Hill, p. 89)

=== Singhpur Darwaza and second court, and Bhairava Darwaza and third court ===
Continuing uphill from the Varaha Darwaza, the path to the summit proceeds west to reach the Singhpur Darwaza, which is the second gateway in the citadel. On the other (inner) side of this gateway is the citadel's second court, which served as an arsenal during the Maratha period. Several old cannons can still be seen here. A temple of Rādhā-Kṛṣṇa is also located in the second court, just in front of the massive third gate, the Bhairava Darwaza. The Bhairava Darwaza leads to the third court, which is filled with the houses of temple servants.

=== Upper citadel and main temple complex ===
After passing westward through Varaha Darwaza, the Singhpur Darwaza, and the Bhairava Darwaza, visitors finally reach the Gokula Darwaza. Past the Gokula Darwaza is the innermost court of the citadel, where the main temple complex enshrining Rāma and Lakṣmaṇa is located. This complex occupies the highest point on the hill, on the western spur.

==== Gokula Darwaza ====
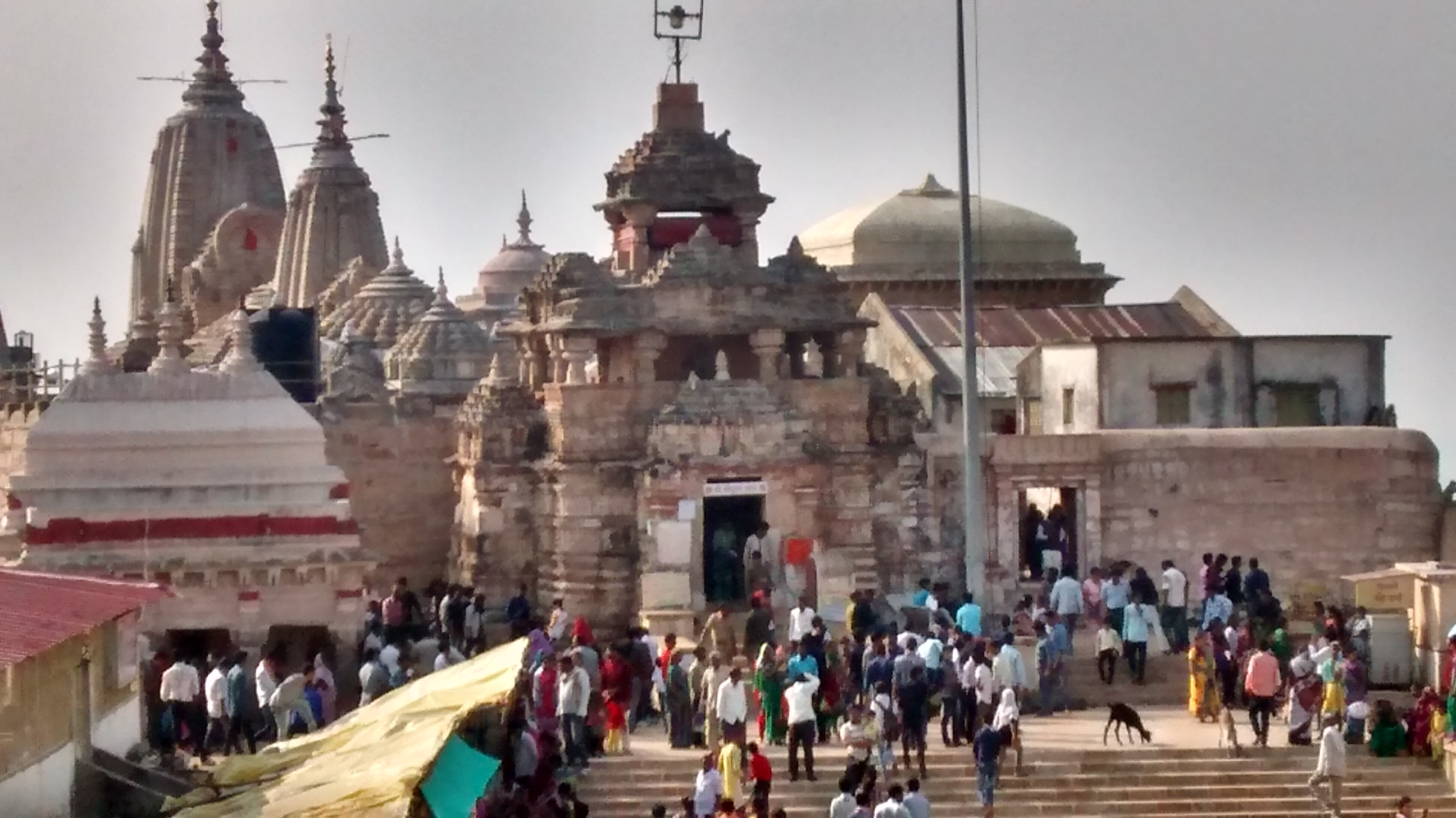
In the foreground is the Gokul Darwaza, with visitors on the steps in front of it. Behind it, the shikharas of the Rama and Lakshmana temples are visible.

The Gokula Darwaza itself is a three-storey gate, with the roof on the first storey set atop a series of pillars (in a style similar to the gate of the Kalika Devi temple). The second (top) level is supported by another series of columns. The walls of the gate are decorated with two sculptured friezes separated by a band decorated with a floral pattern.

==== Temples of Rama and Lakshmana ====
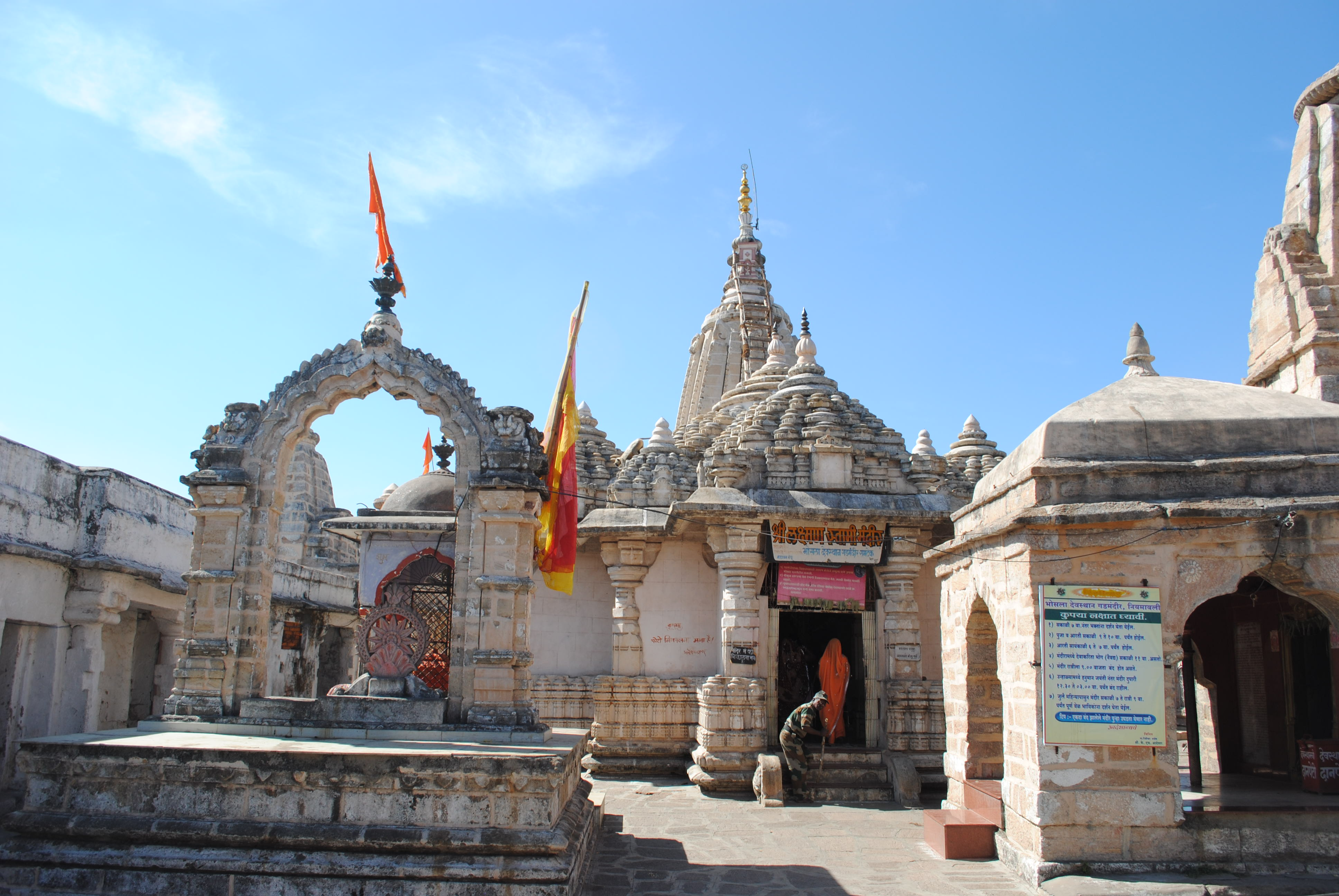
The main temple of Rama has been rebuilt and renovated multiple times throughout its history, which may go back as far as the Vakataka period as well.

The Rāma and Lakṣmaṇa temples both consist of a gently curving śikhara, an antarāla, and a maṇḍapa, with both temples' maṇḍapa halls painted in bright colours and crowned by a dome. The garbhagṛha in the Rāma temple is accessed by a series of copper arches that date from the Maratha period. The temples themselves, though, are generally built in the Hemadpanti style and can be dated to the Yadava period, although they were probably built to replace older structures that may have been present as early as the Vakataka period. The buildings have since been renovated several times.

To the left of the Ram Mandir is a prominent viewpoint known as Rām Jharokā, which offers a panoramic view of Ramtek and its environs.

==== Other shrines in the main complex ====
Several other temples and shrines exist in this main inner compound, mostly dating to the Maratha period. These include temples honouring Vālmikī, Gaṇapati, Lava and Kuśa (Rāma's two sons), Kausalyā (Rāma's mother) and Sumitrā (Lakṣmaṇa's mother), Daśaratha (father of both Rāma and Lakṣmaṇa), Vasiṣṭha, and Lakṣmī-Nārāyaṇa. Almost all of these temples have identically sized garbagṛhas of about 6 by 6 metres (20 ft × 20 ft).

==== Siteci Nhani (Sitasnanasthala) ====
Just beneath the inner enclosure's walls, close to the Gokula Darwaza, is a stone tank called the Siteci Nhani (or Sītāsnānasthala), which is probably a Maratha-period reconstruction of an earlier structure. The gate leading to the water, along with the chhatri atop it, probably dates from the Maratha period, but the two decorative friezes on the tank's western wall have stylistic influences that may indicate influence from earlier Vijayanagara architecture. The friezes depict, among other things: a prince seated on an elephant behind a horseman and foot soldiers, with Garuḍa hovering above and seemingly granting them his blessing; elsewhere, the two-headed eagle Gaṇḍabheruṇḍa (another form of Viṣṇu) is shown devouring or tripping up two elephants (a recurring motif in Vijayanagara imagery).

=== Trivikrama temple ===
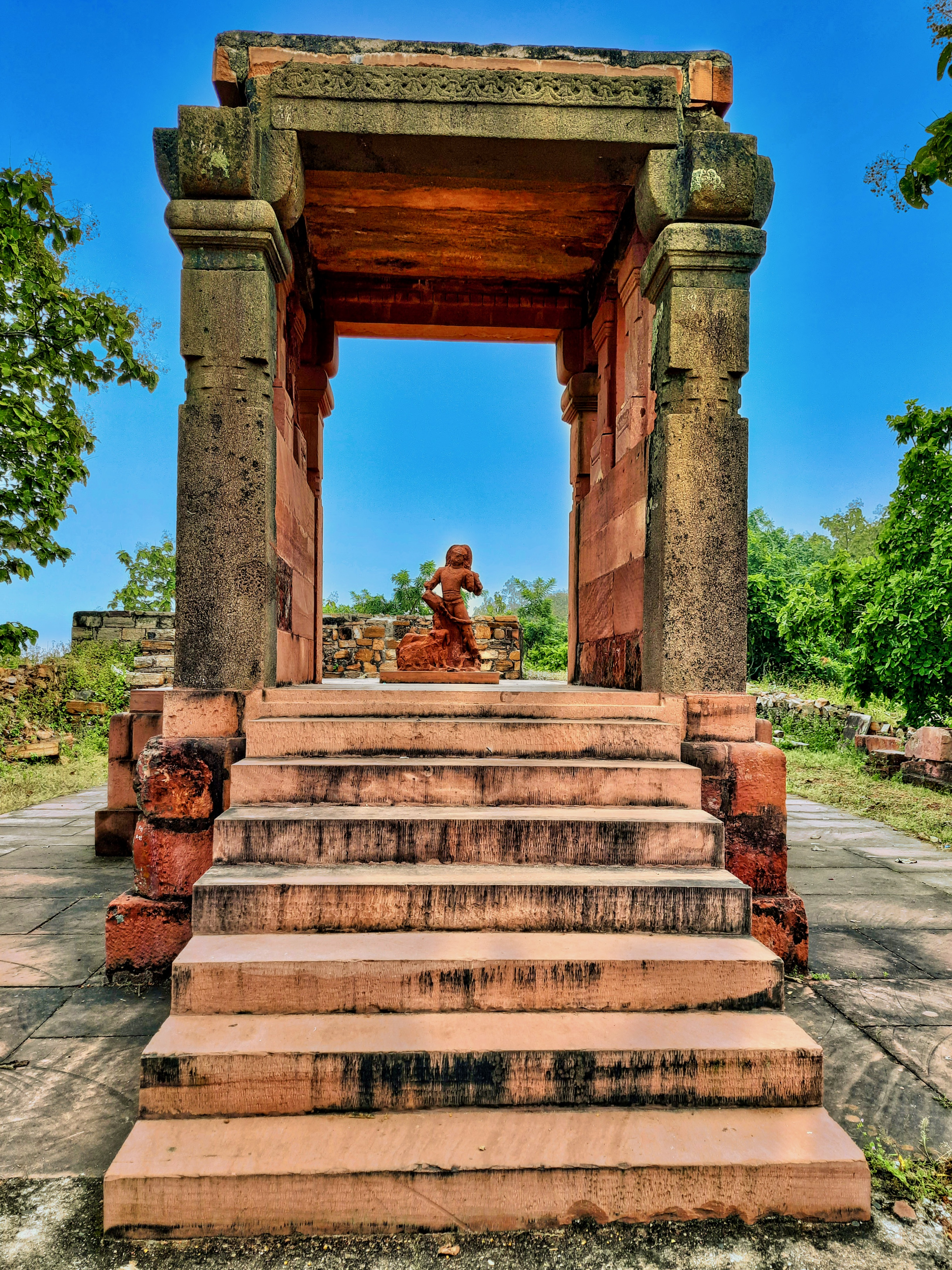
Fairly little survives of the temple of Vamana, or Trivikrama, which dates to the Vakataka period.

Little survives of the Trivikrama temple, which may date from the same period as the Bhogarāma temple or from slightly after: the foundations, the image of Trivikrama himself, and part of the "porch-like" maṇḍapa are all that remain. Like the fragmentary digpala sculptures from the Rudra Narasimha temple, but unlike both images of Narasimha himself and the image of Varāha, the image of Trivikrama is made of red sandstone. The image of Trivikrama would have originally had eight arms, but all of them have broken off. He is depicted here with a halo, or śiraścakra, and probably would have originally been wearing a crown. A small sculpture of Mahābalī performing an añjali mudrā is at Trivikrama's feet.

=== Guptarama cave temple ===
On the southern side of the hill, below the pathway leading to the top, is a cave temple called Guptarāma. Its front has a portico with pillars resembling the pillars in the Keshava Narasimha temple, and the Guptarāma temple may also date from the Vakataka period. Today it features a small basalt linga and image of Nandi, which both date from the Bhosle period in the 1700s. Originally, though, the murti was a stone sculpture of Viṣṇu, which broke off at some point but was found in the area by archaeologists and is now preserved at the Nagpur Central Museum.

=== Siddhanatha cave ===
About 200 m north of Guptarāma, along a narrow path on the hillside slope, is another cave temple called Siddhanātha. This consists of a guphā, which is "a recess in the rock used as a meditation retreat", along with a tiny 1.5m x 1.5m room carved into the rocky hillside, where a couple of ascetics of the Ramanandi Sampradaya live. Based on the pseudo-brackets in the ceiling, this chamber likely dates from the Vakataka period as well. In front of the entrance, there is a place where the pādas of Siddhanātha are worshipped. The site of Siddhanātha may be identical with the tīrtha called Guptabhairava in the Sthānapothī.

=== Karpuravapi tank complex ===
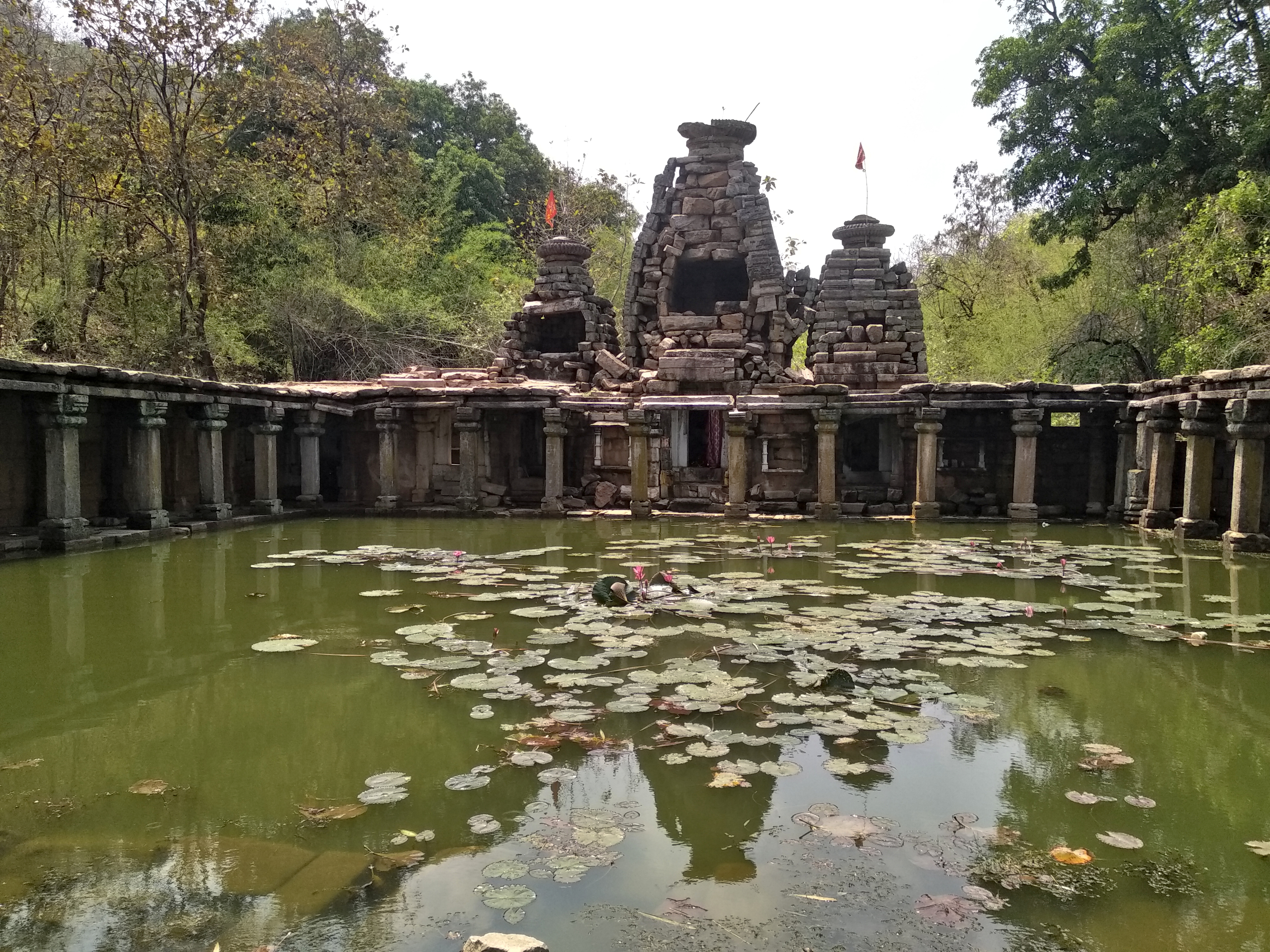
The Karpūravāpī complex, consisting of a tank surrounded by arcades on four sides along with an attached temple, was built or rebuilt during the Yadava period.

At the foot of the hill on the north side, below the Trivikrama temple, is the tank-and-temple complex called Karpūravāpī. It consists of a tank surrounded by roofed colonnades on all four sides (although on the east and north they are partly in ruins) and with a temple with three śikharas on the west side. The śikharas are built of large stone blocks fitted together without mortar, and each one is crowned by an āmalaka. With its "heavy" form and near-total lack of "sculptural embellishment", this temple is a good example of Hemadpanti architecture, which is widespread throughout Maharashtra. Whatever deity (or deities) was originally worshipped here is now impossible to tell.

=== Kalika Devi temple ===
Down in the town below the hill, to the northwest of the hill, is the Kalika Devi temple. It consists of a square vimāna and maṇḍapa. The "superstructure" of the maṇḍapa appears to be a more recent construction, although Bakker tentatively dated the temple as a whole to perhaps the 8th century, during the Chalukya period. The whole temple courtyard is surrounded by an enclosure wall and accessed through a two-storey gate with a roof supported by six pairs of pillars.

=== Jain temple ===
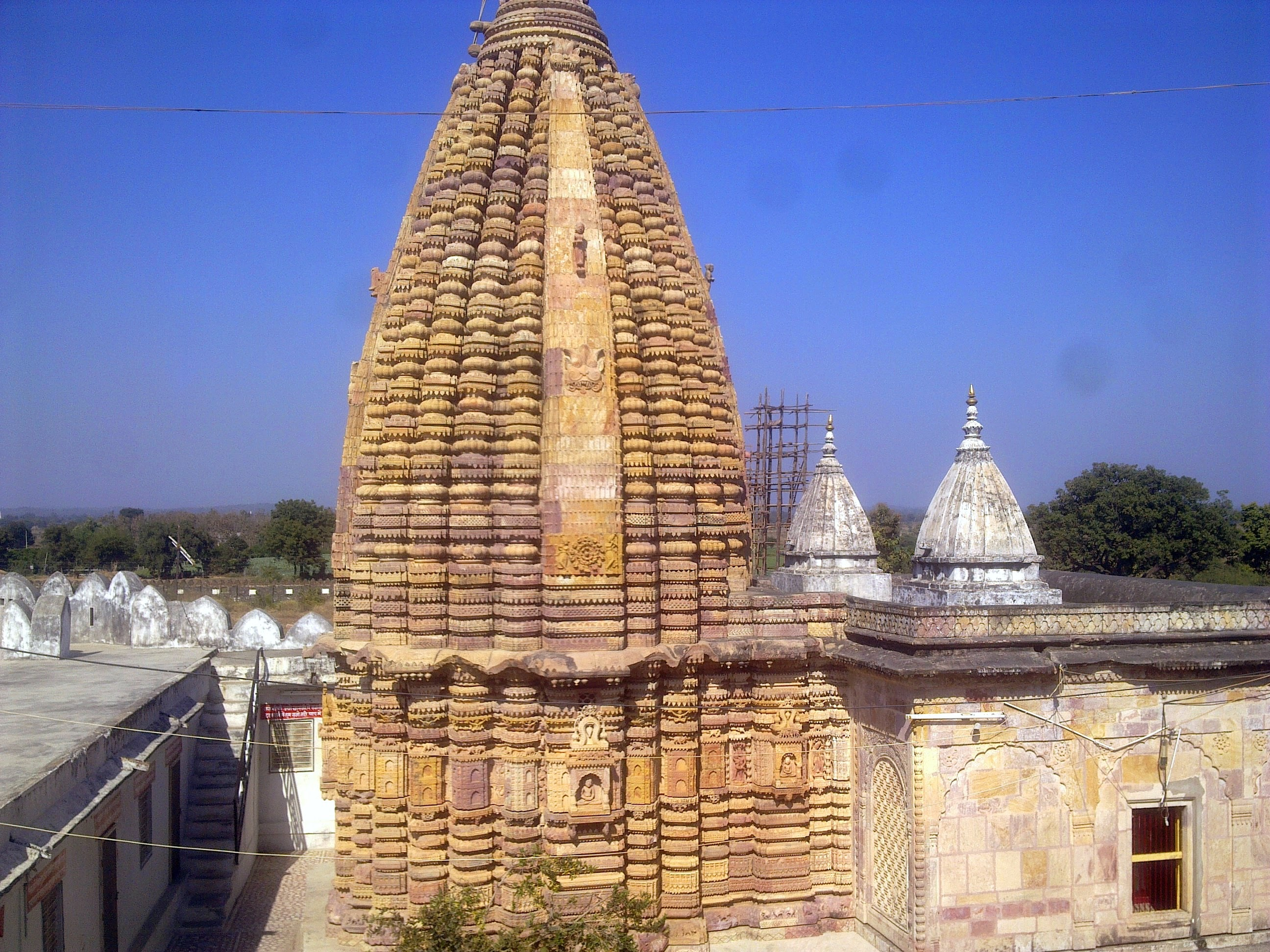
Shantinath Jain temple

Ramtek is also known for its ancient Jain temple with various ancient statues of Jain Tirthankara. The main idol of Shantinatha, the sixteenth Tirthankara has a legend associated with it.

It became more popular when one of the leading Digambar Jain Acharyas, Acharya Vidyasagar visited and stayed with his sangh in Ramtek in 1993, 94, 2008, 2013 and 2017 for the four months of chaturmas during the rainy season. With his inspiration, a big Jain temple has been constructed.

The place was ruled by Gond rulers before being captured by the Bhonsale rulers of Nagpur in the eighteenth century.

=== Kalidasa Memorial ===
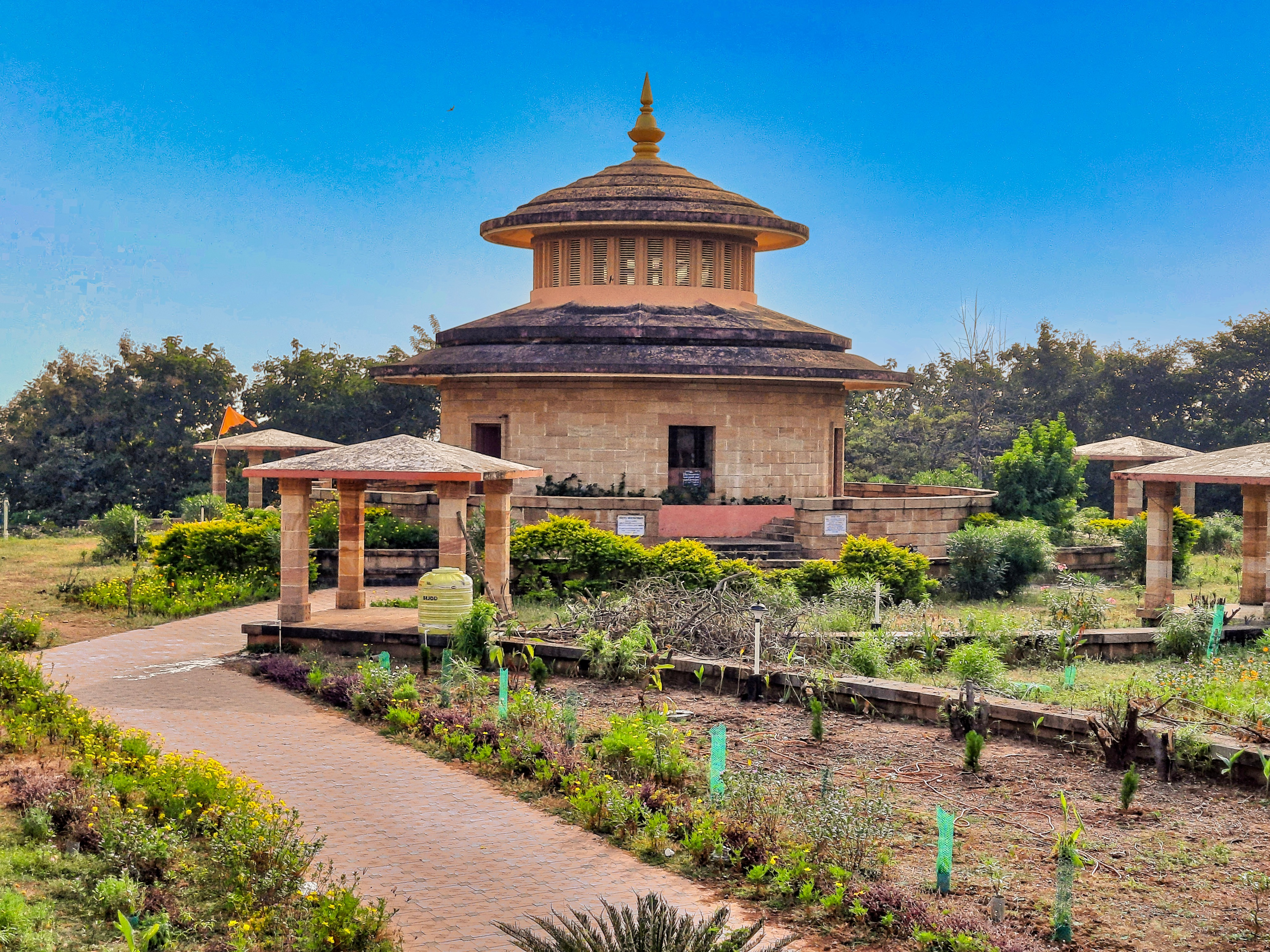
The Kalidasa Memorial commemorates the classical poet Kālidāsa, who may have had Ramtek in mind when he referred to "Rāmagiri" in the Meghadūta.

== Religious significance ==
Ramtek hosts a historic temple of Rama.

According to Hindu mythology, the ashram of the Hindu sage Agastya was situated close to Ramtek. The present temple was built by Raghuji Bhonsale, the Maratha ruler of Nagpur in 18th century after his victory over fort of Deogarh in Chhindwara.

== Attractions ==
Khindsi Lake near Ramtek offers water sports activities. Ramdham, on the Jabalpur National Highway is a theme park with replica temples. Ramdham was later expanded into a water park, resort, adventure zone, agro zone, and bird zone by the name of Lighthouse Water Park & Resort.

== Economy ==
Ramtek is noted for its betel cultivation, and large areas of farmland around the city are dedicated to betel production. Rice, wheat, and soybean crops are also some of the most important farm products in Ramtek's agricultural hinterland. Manganese mining is also a major economy activity in the area, with major mines around Kandri and Waitola to the west, closer to Mansar than Ramtek proper. There are also iron mines in this area. A rail line connects the mines to Ramtek. A handful of banks (four government-owned and two cooperative) and about a dozen credit societies operate in Ramtek.

== Demographics ==
As of 2001 India census, Ramtek had a population of 22,517. Males constitute 51% of the population and females 49%. Ramtek has an average literacy rate of 75%, higher than the national average of 59.5%: male literacy is 82%, and female literacy is 68%. In Ramtek, 12% of the population is under 6 years of age.

The 2011 census reported that Ramtek had a population of 22,310, in 4,929 households.

Year	Male	Female	Total Population	Change	Religion (%)							
Year	Male	Female	Total Population	Change	Hindu	Muslim	Christian	Sikhs	Buddhist	Jain	Other religions and persuasions	Religion not stated
2001	11554	10962	22516	-	84.038	5.547	0.115	0.133	8.834	0.737	0.551	0.044
2011	11321	10989	22310	-0.915	84.496	6.015	0.036	0.081	8.467	0.758	0.121	0.027

== Government ==
Ramtek municipality is administered by a board of ten members. The board members vote to appoint a municipal president (who is chosen from among the ten members), and the president then appoints a vice president from among the other nine members. Municipal elections are held every three years. As of 1966, the board members were elected from eight wards: two each for Bastervāḍī-Papḍhup and Hanumantpura-Maṅgalvāḍī, and one for each of the remaining six wards. One of the seats in Bastervāḍī-Papḍhup was reserved for a woman, and one of the seats in Hanumantpura-Maṅgalvāḍī was reserved for a Scheduled Castes member. From this board, members formed various committees dealing with topics such as finance, sanitation, or education.

== Education ==
Ramtek has an engineering college, KITS, which comes under the Rashtrasant Tukadoji Maharaj Nagpur University, Nagpur as also the Kavikulaguru Kalidas Sanskrit University. The college, Shri Narendra Tidke College of Arts and Commerce is also located in Ramtek.

As of 2011, Ramtek had 12 primary schools, 5 secondary schools, 1 college, and 2 public libraries.

== Healthcare ==
As of 2011, Ramtek had one hospital, with 50 beds; a maternity home; and a veterinary hospital. The main hospital is located on the south side of town.

== Transport ==
The Ramtek railway station is located west of the town, and the Ramtek branch line connects to the South East Central Railway Zone toward Nagpur in the southwest.

== Festivals ==
The two biggest religious festivals in Ramtek are Rāmanavāmi and Kārttika Pūrṇimā. As many as 20,000 to 30,000 people gather for these occasions. On Kārttika Pūrṇimā, a yellow silk cloth called pitāṃbar is burnt at the Rām Mandir in commemoration of Shiva's smiting of Tripurāsura.

== See also ==
- Kachurwahi
