= Ramtek railway station =

Railway Station in Maharashtra, India

Ramtek

General information
- Location: State Highway 249, Ramtek, Maharashtra, India
- Coordinates: 21.3935°N 79.3000°E
- Elevation: 327 metres (1,073 ft)
- System: Passenger train station
- Owner: Indian Railways
- Line: Nagpur–Ramtek line

Construction
- Structure type: Standard (on-ground station)
- Parking: Available

Other information
- Status: Functioning
- Station code: RTK
- Zone(s): South East Central Railway zone
- Division(s): Nagpur SEC
Location
- Location within India Location within Maharashtra

Ramtek railway station is a small railway station in South East Central Railway. It is serving the historic city of Ramtek in the Nagpur district of Maharashtra, India. The station code is RTK.

In 2019, Rs.418 crore was sanctioned to connect four towns of Wardha, Bhandara Road, Ramtek and Narkhed through Nagpur broad gauge metro.

== Location ==
The nearest main railway station is Nagpur Junction railway station, which is about 50 kilometres (31 mi) from Ramtek. The Ramtek station connects only with Nagpur Junction and with Itwari railway station.
