= Khindsi Lake =

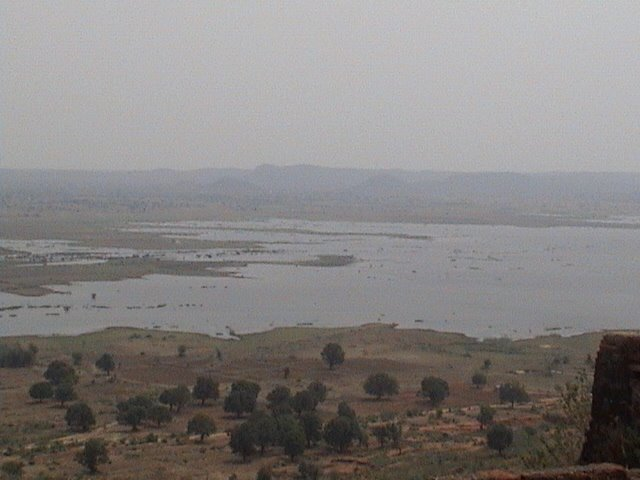
- Khindsi Lake

- Location within Maharashtra
- Location: Nagpur district
- Coordinates: 21.3965°N 79.3721°E
- Type: reservoir
- Basin countries: India
- Max. length: 6.54 km (4.06 mi)
- Max. width: 3.15 km (1.96 mi)
- Islands: numerous islets
- Settlements: Ramtek

Khindsi Lake is a lake near the city of Ramtek in the Nagpur district of India. The lake offers boating activities, watersports, restaurants, and resorts, which are operated by Rajkamal Tourism and Olive Resorts at Khindsi Lake. It is Central India's largest boating center and amusement park, with many tourists visiting every year.
