= Mahadamba =

Mahadamba (c. 1228 – c. 1303), also known by the name Mahadaisa, was a pioneering Marathi poetess who belonged to the Mahanubhava sect. She is highly regarded for her early contributions to Marathi literature, particularly through her devotional compositions.

== Biography ==
=== Early life and family ===
According to biographical accounts found within Mahanubhav literature, Mahadamba was born into the lineage of Vamanacharya, who served as the priest for King Mahadevaray Yadav of Devagiri. Vamanacharya's son, Maheshwarpandit, had two sons named Madhavbhat (also referred to as Madhavdev) and Bayenayek. Mahadamba was the daughter of Bayenayek. Nagdevacharya, who later became the first Acharya of the Mahanubhav sect, was the son of Madhavbhat, making Mahadamba and Nagdevacharya paternal cousins.

Mahadamba was widowed during her childhood. Mentions in Mahanubhav texts describe her as an exceptionally intelligent individual who possessed a deeply detached and ascetic nature.

=== Spiritual life ===
Following the departure of Sri Chakradhar, the founder of the Mahanubhav sect, Mahadamba relocated to Riddhipur. There, she entered into the service of Shri Govindaprabhu, who was the guru of Sri Chakradhar. After the death of Shri Govindaprabhu, she spent the majority of her remaining life in the company of Nagdevacharya. Historical accounts suggest that Nagdevacharya was present by her side at the time of her death. She commanded immense respect among the followers of the Mahanubhav sect.

== Literary works ==
Mahadamba's life events and actions are recorded across several prominent Mahanubhav texts, including the Leelacharita, Shri Govindaprabhucharitra, Smritisthal, and Itihas.

=== Dhavale ===
Mahadamba achieved widespread fame for composing Dhavale, which are songs dedicated to the marriage of Krishna and Rukmini. These verses are characterized by their simple and accessible composition style. The work is divided into two distinct sections:

- Purvardha (First Half): This section was entirely composed by Mahadamba and is estimated to have been written prior to the year 1287.
- Uttarardha (Second Half): While composing this section, Mahadamba received assistance from Mhaimbhat and Lakshmidharbhat. It is estimated to have been written before the year 1303.

=== Other compositions ===
- Matruki Rukmini Swayamvar: This poem also focuses on the theme of the marriage of Krishna and Rukmini. The work derives its name from the inclusion of fifty-two matrukas (characters/alphabets), with one positioned at the beginning of each ovi verse. The style of this poem reflects the echoes and influences of her earlier Dhavale compositions.
- Garbhakand Ovyoc: This is a spiritual composition attributed to Mahadamba.
