= Kachurwahi =

Village in Maharashtra

- village
- Location in Maharashtra, India Kachurwahi (India)
- Coordinates: 21.3333°N 79.3833°E
- Country: India
- State: Maharashtra
- District: Nagpur

Area
  - Total: 1 km^{2} (0.39 sq mi)
- Elevation: 294 m (965 ft)

Population (2001)
  - Total: 2,678
  - Density: 2,700/km^{2} (6,900/sq mi)

Language
  - Official: Marathi
- Time zone: UTC+5:30 (IST)
- PIN: 441106
- Telephone code: +07114
- Vehicle registration: MH-40
- Sex ratio: 980/1000 ♂/♀

Kachurwahi is a Gram Panchayat village in Ramtek Tehsil of Nagpur district, India. It is situated in the South East of Ramtek at the distance of 10 km from Ramtek.

The village has a post office and a branch of State Bank of India. It has a primary school and two high schools.
