= Leela Charitra =

Biography of Sarvagya Shri Chakradhar Swami and the teaching for the disciples

Leela Charitra is a biography of Chakradhar Swami, the guru of the Mahanubhava sect, and is a sacred text of that sect. It was written in the late 13th century by their follower Mhaimbhat with reference from Shri Nagdev Aacharya

The Leela Charitra, was written in Marathi. It was further translated in Hindi by many authors like Late. Shri Vidyadhar Babaji Punjabi and the other one was Dr. Yashraj Shastri.

The Leela Charitra, though written in Marathi, is replete with Kannada words.

== Literary and historical significance ==
The text is widely considered the earliest extant Marathi prose work, predating later hagiographical and saint-poetic traditions in the region. As such, it not only marks the beginning of Marathi prose but also set a template for biographical narratives in regional Indian languages. Scholars note that Leela Charitra provides invaluable information on the social, political, and cultural life of 13th-century Maharashtra.

== Cultural insights ==
Beyond religious content, the text offers detailed glimpses of medieval Maharashtrian society, including caste practices, gender relations, political authority, and social mobility. Some scholars suggest that the text’s emphasis on spiritual access for all shows an egalitarian trend within the sect, which stood in contrast to the rigid social hierarchies of the time.
