= Chakradhar Swami =

Indian philosopher, Founder of Mahanubhava Sector in Hindu

Sarvajna Shri Chakradhara Swami

Personal life
- Born: Haripaladeva; 1194 Bharuch, Solanki dynasty (present-day Gujarat, India)
- Parents: Viśāladeva (father); Mālhaṇadevī (mother)
- Known for: Founding of Mahanubhava sect

Religious life
- Religion: Hindu
- Philosophy: Mahanubhava, Dvaitism

Chakradhara (also known as Sarvajña Shri Chakradhar(a) Swāmī or Kunwar Haripāladeva) was an Indian Hindu saint and philosopher, who was the founder of Mahanubhava sect of Krishnaism. Chakradhara advocated worship of the god Krishna and preached a distinct philosophy based on Bhakti. He was an exponent of the Dvaita philosophy within Hinduism.

Chakradhara did not recognize caste distinctions, and distinguished only between the householder and recluses. Some sources claim that Chakrapani Prabhu and Govinda Prabhu as the originators of Mahanubhava doctrine and Chakradhara as the first apostle who systematized Mahanubhava as a school of Bhakti philosophy. Chakradhara is considered as an avatar of Krishna by his disciples. his incarnation day is observed on the Tithi of Bhadrapada Shukla Dwitiya.

== Life ==
Chakradhara was born into a Gujarati Samavedi Brahmin family in Bharuch, Gujarat. According to his biography Lilacharitra, he was the son of a royal minister of Gujarat. The Lilacharitra dates his birth to 1193, names his father Vishaldeva as minister to King Malladeva, and gives his own birth name as Haripal.

He took Sannyasa at a young age and left his home for pilgrimage to Ramtek. During his journey, he received initiation from his guru Govinda Prabhu at Ridhapur in modern-day Amravati district. Govinda Prabhu named him Chakradhar, "the one who holds the discus".

For twelve years, he stayed in forests of Vindhya mountain as an ascetic. His hagiography calls these solitary years the ekanka throughout which he kept a vow of silence. He then wandered across Yadava territory and into Karnataka and Andhra, where he became famous as an adept Natha yogi.

After attaining the awakening, he started preaching a new philosophy, Mahanubhava tattvajnana to the common people. Although his native language was Gujarati, he had excellent command over Marathi. Chakradhara moved among all sections of society. He discoursed his philosophy effectively among the people in their own language. The Lilacharitra confirms that he also spoke fluent Sanskrit along with Gujarati and Marathi. He used formulaic language full of meaning in a compact style. He insisted that his disciples should write only in Marathi. Thus the teachings of Chakradhara and Mahanubhava Sampradaya are found in Marathi literature.

The second phase of his life story begins when he settles at Paithan and accepts his first core disciple, Nagubai, a Deshastha Brahmin woman he called Baisa. Women appear to have made up most of his following at Paithan.

The last phase opens with his initiation of Nagadev, later called Bhatobas, a Brahmin and former mercenary whom he appointed as his successor. Some versions of the Lilacharitra end with his arrest on the orders of the Yadava minister Hemadri and a tribunal that charged him with impropriety in teaching women. In these version, his noseis said to have been cut off, him getting beheaded, and later coming back to life. However, many many Mahanubhavas do not regard these events as historical. The text closes with Chakradhar leaving Maharashtra for Ujjain. Most Mahanubhavas believe he is still alive in the Himalaya. The Smrutisthala dates his departure to late Shaka 1194, or early 1273 CE.

== Philosophy∂ ==
Chakradhara's philosophy focused on asceticism and renunciation. His fourfold teachings were: non-violence (ahimsa), celibacy (brahmacharya), asceticism (sannyasa) and devotion (bhakti). He prescribed different aspects of God to be worshipped: name, form, activity, deeds, place, vachanas (Shruti), memories (Smriti) and the blessing of God's incarnation. He considered five forms of God as Supreme called "Pancha Krishna": Dattatreya, Krishna, Chakrapani, Govinda Prabhu and Chakradhara himself.

As per Chakradhara, one can practice bhakti by memorizing deeds of God. The aspirant for salvation must sacrifice his country, village and his relations and offer his life to God. He also taught his disciple when, where, how, how much alms they should be beg for. The central theme of his teaching was, "Feel the soul and not the body". Living the life of mendicant and practicing asceticism severely, the devotee should live according to principle, "God is mine and I am God's". The core of his code of behaviour is summed up in the following line for the benefit of his followers: "Even if the head is cut off, the body should worship God".

Besides teaching strict vegetarianism, the Mahanubhava sect forbids the use of alcohol and teaches non-violence. It teaches that Krishna is the Supreme God; other deities are his powers. As per scriptures of Mahanubhava that Nirvana (Moksha) can only be achieved by knowing and worshiping Krishna as the lone ultimate and thus one must give up on worshiping and getting involved unconsciously in the other powers of ultimate, It can be relatively explained as one should not be satisfied in loving the creation but love the creator.
