= Mahanubhava =

Krishnaite Vaishnava denomination

Founder
- Sarvajna Shri Chakradhar Swami

Regions with significant populations
- Maharashtra, Punjab, Madhya Pradesh, Gujarat and parts of North India

Scriptures
- Leela Charitra, Siddhanta Sutrapatha, Bhagavad Gita

Languages
- Marathi (Primary) • Sanskrit and others

Mahanubhava (also known as Jai Shri Krishna Pantha) is a Krishnaite Hindu denomination (Sampradaya or Pantha) in India that is generally described to be founded by Chakradhara Swami. Some sources list the founders as Chakrapani (Chāngadeva Rāuḷ) and Govinda Prabhu (Gunḍama Rāuḷ) with Chakradhara Swami as the first "apostle" and propagator of Mahanubhava Pantha. Mahanubhava Sampradaya was formally formed in the modern-day Varhad region of Maharashtra in 1267 CE. It has different names such as Jai Krishni Pantha in Punjab and Achyuta Pantha in Gujarat. Mahanubhava Pantha was also known as Paramarga by its followers in the 13th century. Nagadevacharya, also known as Bhatobas, became the head of Sampradaya after Chakradhara.

In Mahanubhava, all members are accepted, irrespective of their castes, and the traditional ritualistic religion is rejected. Mahanubhava survives to the present day. It teaches that Krishna is the supreme God. Mahanubhavas regard Krishna as an incarnation of the one God, Paramesvara, and not of Vishnu, whom they count among the lesser deities.

Mahanubhava Sampradaya has 13 different Amnaya (it is ancestral big family tracing their roots backwards). These traditions were founded by 13 different acharyas which include some disciples of Nagadevacharya and various successors in their lineages.

== Chakradhara ==
Chakradhara (known as Sarvajna Shri Chakradhar Swami in the sect) propounded the philosophy of Mahanubhava Sampradaya for the first time. He theorized the idea of "Five Krishnas" as the main figures for Mahanubhavas to worship.

Chakradhara was born in a Marathi Deshastha Brahmin. He moved among all sections of society. He discoursed his philosophy to the people in their own language. He used formulaic language full of meaning in a compact style. He exhorted his disciples to write only in Marathi.

== Philosophy ==
According to the Mahanubhava Philosophy, there are four permanent realities in the universe which are Paramesvara (God), Jiva (soul), Devata (deities and supernatural beings) and Prapancha (world). These four entities are uncreated, eternal and independent from each other. Prapancha is of two types—Suksma (matter) or Karana Prapancha and Sthula (material) or Karya Prapancha. Karana Prapancha is immortal but Karya Prapancha is perishable. Paramesvara is the supreme entity in this universe. Paramesvara is one, unique, perfect, omnipotent, omniscient, omnipresent, impersonal and absolute.

There are innumerable souls (Jiva) and material worlds (Sthula Prapancha) existing in the universe. Devata (deities) are 810,125,010 in number including Maya. The purpose of Jiva is to attain Moksha and the Devata is a powerful impediment to Jiva. All Devata are subject to Paramesvara (Supreme God) and they help him to create material world with Maya as their main contributor. The material world is composed of Panchatattva viz. Akasha, Vayu, Tejas, Apas, Prithvi and Triguna viz. Sattva, Rajas and Tamas.

Mahanubhava teachings mainly concerned with the relationship between Jiva and Paramesvara. One can practice bhakti by memorising deeds of the almighty. The aspirant for salvation must sacrifice his country, village and his relations and offer his life to god. Chakradhara also taught the followers of Mahanubhava Sampradaya; when, where, how and how much alms they should be beg for.

Schools of Vedanta

Vedanta
Bhedabheda (Note: The realistic stance of Bhedabheda probably predates Shankara's Advaita. The Brahma Sutras may reflect a Bhedabheda-perspective. See Nicholson (2010)); 4th century CE	Advaita (Shankara, Gaudapada); 5th–8th century CE (Note: Shankara (8th c.) is considered to be the principal spokesman of the Advaita Vedanta tradition, but synthesized existing Vedanta-views. See Advaita Vedanta#Between Brahma Sutras and Shankara; Nakamura (1950) p.678-679)	Vishishtadvaita (Ramanuja); 11th century CE	Dvaita (Madhva); 13th century CE	Neo-Vedanta (Note: Neo-Vedanta is a modern interpretation of Vedanta, with a liberal attitude toward the Vedas; see King (2001). It may also be regarded as a modern form of Bhedabheda, since it reconciles dualism and non-dualism; see Sooklal (1993) Nicholas F. Gier (2013) p.268-269: "Ramakrsna, Swami Vivekananda, and Aurobindo (I also include M.K. Gandhi) have been labeled "neo-Vedantists," a philosophy that rejects the Advaitins' claim that the world is illusory. Aurobindo, in his The Life Divine, declares that he has moved from Sankara's "universal illusionism" to his own "universal realism" (2005: 432), defined as metaphysical realism in the European philosophical sense of the term.") (Vivekananda and Radhakrishnan); 19th century CE
Upadhika (Bhaskara); 9th century	Dvaitādvaita (Nimbarka); 13th century	Shuddhadvaita (Vallabha); 16th century	Achintya (Chaitanya and Jiva); 16th century

Mahanubhava is not a sub-school of Vedanta, although it has some similarities with the schools of Vedanta philosophy. The 'Mahanubhava Darshana' is a distinct school of Indian philosophy which emphasizes on the concept of Bhakti.
Notes, references and sources for table

Notes and references

Sources

- Gier, Nicholas F. (2012). "Overreaching to be different: A critique of Rajiv Malhotra's Being Different". International Journal of Hindu Studies. 16 (3). Springer Netherlands: 259–285. doi:10.1007/s11407-012-9127-x. ISSN 1022-4556.
- King, Richard (2001), Orientalism and Religion: Post-Colonial Theory, India and "The Mystic East", Taylor & Francis e-Library
- Nakamura, Hajime (1950), A History of Early Vedanta Philosophy. Part Two (2004 Reprint), Delhi: Motilal Banarsidass Publishers Private Limited
- Nicholson, Andrew J. (2010), Unifying Hinduism: Philosophy and Identity in Indian Intellectual History, Columbia University Press
- Raju, P.T. (1992), The Philosophical Traditions of India, Delhi: Motilal Banarsidass Publishers Private Limited
- Sheridan, Daniel (1986). The Advaitic Theism of the Bhāgavata Purāṇa. Delhi: Motilal Banarsidass. p. 139.
- Sivananda, Swami (1993), All About Hinduism, The Divine Life Society
- Gerald Surya, Review of "A Critique of A. C. Bhaktivedanta" by K. P. Sinha
- Sooklal, Anil (1993), "The Neo-Vedanta Philosophy of Swami Vivekananda" (PDF), Nidan, 5, 1993
- Olivelle, Patrick (1992). The Samnyasa Upanisads. Oxford University Press. pp. 1–18. ISBN 978-0195070453.

Mahanubhava philosophy states that only Paramesvara can give Moksha (ultimate salvation from the cycle of birth and death) to every living creature in the material world. Jiva therefore should worship only Paramesvara rather than minor deities or nature spirits. Mahanubhavas worship Paramesvara in the form of its five Avatara (incarnations) to personify its original Nirguna (indeterminate) form. One of the most important aspects of Mahanubhava philosophy is asceticism. The fourfold teachings are: non-violence, celibacy, asceticism and bhakti. The essential concept to be included in the reverence for 5 incarnations is memorising the several aspects of them, i.e. name, appearance or form, activities, deeds, words spoken by them (Shruti), memories about them (Smriti) and blessings given by them. Other beliefs involved in Mahanubhava doctrine are Nitya Puja of Panchavatara for 3 times every day and recitation of the names of Panchavatara. Mahanubhava followers also do Smarana (remembrance) of the five incarnations including incidents and objects related to their lives as well as the places connected with them. Mahanubhava followers visit pilgrimage sites like Ruddhipur (Ridhapur), Jalicha dev, Domegram, Paithan, Mahur, Phaltan and Panchaleshwar.

The central theme of Mahanubhava doctrine is, "Feel the soul and not the body". Living the life of mendicant and practicing asceticism severely, the devotee should live according to principle, "God is mine and I am god's". The core of his code of behavior is summed up in the following line for the benefit of his followers: "Even if the head is cut off, the body should worship god".

Besides teaching strict vegetarianism, Mahanubhava Pantha forbids the use of alcohol and teaches non-violence. Theft, gambling, hunting, promiscuity etc. are strictly prohibited and considered as great sins. Mahanubhava doctrine rejects Vedic rituals but not the Vedic philosophy. Mahanubhavas follow the teachings of Shri Chakradhar Swami. Mahanubhavas totally reject the caste system, hegemony of Varna and any kind of social discrimination. They believe that every person has right to attain Moksha, regardless of varna and castes.

Development of Mahanubhava philosophy may have started in the 12th century during the lifetime of Chakrapani Prabhu. Chakradhar Swami officially described it in a well-integrated manner in the latter half of the 13th century

== Literature ==
Mahanubhava literature generally comprises rhetoric and commentaries. Mahanubhavas authored numerous treatise that describe about the 5 incarnations of god, they compiled various hagiographies and wrote memoirs about the history of the sect. Mahanubhavas composed numerous literary works in Marathi during the medieval period like commentaries on Bhagavad Gita, Leela Charitra and Sutrapatha; epics narrating stories from the life of Shri Krishna; various reference works viz. lexicons, chronicles, biographies, itineraries and genealogies. Mahanubhava Marathi literature covered various literary forms like anecdotes, allegories, ballads, prayers, hymns, verses as well as chants. Mahanubhava writers wrote grammatical and etymological works related to the Old Marathi language. They also wrote many treatise based on the Puranas, that are deemed useful to explain the philosophy of Mahanubhava Sampradaya. The Mahanubhava were the earliest writers to use Marathi as a literary language. Mahanubhavas can be called as the pioneers of Marathi prose; they introduced many prose forms in Marathi for the first time. Prose literature in Old Marathi was almost exclusively composed by the Mahanubhava writers. The Mahanubhavas have contributed enormously to the Old Marathi literature. Purest form of Marathi language can be seen everywhere in the Mahanubhava literature. Marathi is the liturgical language for Mahanubhavas. Non-Marathi speaking Mahanubhavas also read Sutras in Marathi and chant Marathi prayers.

Leela Charitra (Lilacharitra) is thought to be one of the earliest biographies written in Marathi language. The Lilacharaitra is the first scripture of Mahanubhava Sampradaya, it was composed by Mhaimbhat. Mhaimbhat's second important literacy creation was Shri Govindaprabhucharitra or Ruddhipurcharitra, a biography of Swami's guru, Shri Govinda Prabhu, in the form of 325 deeds. This was probably written in 1288, soon after the death of Shri Prabhu.BEFORE: This was probably written in 1288, soon after the death of Shri Prabhu. AFTER: Mahanubhava tradition has it composed six months after Govinda Prabhu's death, which points to 1287, though the surviving manuscripts do not go back directly to that text.

Apart from Lilacharitra, Keshavaraja Suri (Keshiraja Vyasa) also known as Kesobas, collected Chakradhara's aphoristic Vachana or actually spoken words, known as Siddhanta Sutrapatha. Keshavaraja Suri translated the "deeds" from Lilacharitra into Sanskrit in his work called Ratnamala. His another work is Drushtantapatha which was composed in 1280 CE, similarly he has also written a Sanskrit version of it known as Drushtantastotram. Nagadevacharya as the first chief acharya of Sampradaya, encouraged many of his disciples and companions to compose treatise on the teachings of Sarvajna Chakradhara. memoirs of Nagadeva were compiled by Narendra, Malobas and Parasrambas in 1312 CE, they are known as Smrutisthala. Baidevabas wrote Pujavasara which describes the daily routine of Chakradhara.

In this manner, the seven works have been written, which are known as Sati Grantha and they are accepted by the follower of the sect. These works and their writers are:

1. Narendra : Rukminiswayamvara (1292 CE)
2. Bhāskarabhatta Borikar : Shishupalavadha (1312 CE)
3. Bhāskarabhatta Borikar : Uddhavagita (1313 CE)
4. Damodara Pandita : Vachhaharana (1316 CE)
5. Ravalobas : Sahyadrivarnana (1353 CE)
6. Narobas Bahahaliye : Ruddhipurvarnana (1418 CE)
7. Vishwanatha Balapurkar : Jnanaprabodha (1418 CE)

Narendra and his brothers, Sala and Nrusinha were the court poets of Ramadevarao Yadava. Damodara Pandita and Bhaskarabhatta Borikar (Kavishwarabas) were one of the earliest Mahanubhava poets. Mahadamba (also known as Mahadaisa) was the leading woman poet of Sampradaya and is considered as first known woman poet in Marathi language of the 13th century. Mahanubhava poetry is rich of various styles and metres. Many Mahanubhava poets have composed their works in Sanskrit as well.

During the later period, Hayagrivacharya wrote Gadyaraja based on the 'Dashama Skandha' of Bhagavata. Pandita Bhishmamuni wrote the oldest available grammar of Old Marathi language known as Panchavartika in the 14th century. Nyayabas wrote Hetusthala (purpose of the deeds) on Lilacharitra and Bhishmacharya Vaindeshkar wrote Niruktashesha describing Prasanga Mahatmya in Lilacharitra during the second half of the 14th century. Itineraries like Sthanapothi and Tirthamalika were composed between 14th and 15th centuries. A Gujarati acharya called Gurjara Shivabas compiled 3 commentaries on Siddhanta Sutrapatha during the 15th century; their names are Acharasthala, Vicharasthala and Lakshanasthala. He also wrote Mahavakyaprameya and Thorli Prasadaseva. Songobas (Sangapala), nephew of Gurjara Shivabas wrote Anvayasthala describing the history of Mahanubhava tradition till his era with the help of Siddhante Haribas. Medieval Mahanubhava writers composed many prose works and philosophical texts in Marathi language. Chalhana, one of the most prominent Mahanubhava writers of 15th century wrote the masterpieces like Sattvanuvada, Jnanaprakasha and Shastrasambodhini Tika. His disciple Nrusinha Pandita wrote Sanketagita. Anantamuni Karanjkar aka Aemuni, who was from Kavishwar Amnaya (lineage) composed most celebrated Vruddhachara (reminiscences) of Sampradaya. Further, many Mahanubhava philosophers wrote commentaries on Siddhanta Sutrapatha like Vishwanathabas Bidkar wrote Acharaband, Avadhutamuni Vaindeshkar wrote Vicharaband and Dattaraja Marathe wrote Lakshanaband.

Krushnamuni Dimbha was the prominent Mahanubhava poet of the 16th century. He wrote Phaltan Mahatmya, which describes the biography of Chakrapani Prabhu. His other works include Sadhanamrutasotra and Bhagvadgita Mahatmya. He also composed several verses praising the Panchakrishnas in various metres. Chakrapani Vyasa wrote Drushtantasthala and Nityadini Lilastotra during the late 16th century. He was a Saraswat Brahmin from Rajasthan, he took initiation from an acharya of Bidkar Amnaya and then settled at Ruddhipur. Other important poets of the 16th century were Lakshadhira, Murarimalla, Navarasa Narayana and Elhana. Lakshadhira's works are Jnanadarpana, Jnanamartanda and Maharashtra Kavyadipika. His Maharashtra Kavyadipika is a monumental work. It describes various poetic metres of Marathi and types of Ovi, the most prevalent metre in Marathi. Murarimalla wrote Darshanaprakasha. Navarasa Narayana composed Mahabharata in Marathi. But unfortunately, only one chapter of his work is available today. Elhana's works include Shrikrushna Ashta Swayamvara (Athai Sainvare) and Balakrida. Ashta Swayamvara describes the episodes of eight marriages in the life of Shri Krishna and Balakrida describes about childhood pranks of his life. A Muslim acharya named Shahmuni wrote a treatise called Siddhantabodha in the 18th century for elucidating the principles of Mahanubhava philosophy.

Mahanubhava writers also composed many works in Hindi, Punjabi and Gujarati languages. Nagraj Vyas, Vidhichandra Sharma and Gaurswami are some of the important Mahanubhava writers of North India during the medieval age. Hariraj Mahatma 'Musafir', Chakradhari Bezar, Gopirajbaba Mahanubhav and Mukundraj Mahanubhav etc. were prolific North Indian Mahanubhava writers during British era.

Mahanubhavas created many code-scripts like 'Sakala Lipi', 'Sundari Lipi', 'Shunya Lipi', 'Aankapallavi Lipi' etc. to protect and preserve their literature.

Mahanubhava poets have written numerous prayers and psalms devoted to the Pancha Krishna Avatara (5 incarnations) in Marathi, Sanskrit and other languages.

== History ==
Mahanubhava doctrine originated during the late 12th century. Chakradhara was the first preceptor who organized the separate denomination called Mahanubhava on the basis of its doctrine.

Nagadevacharya systematized the tradition of disciples in Mahanubhava Sampradaya after Chakradhara. He initiated several disciples to upbuild the sampradya. During the period of Nagadeva, many followers joined the Sampradaya.

Acharya Munivyasa established many temples and shrines of Mahanubhava Sampradaya in Maharashtra during the early 15th century. Munivyasa was originally a Veerashaiva from Telangana, his original name was Kamalakara Ayachita Kothi. He left his former faith, entered in Mahanubhava Sampradaya and became disciple of Tapasvini Mhalaisa from Kumar Amnaya. It's recorded in texts like Kumar Vansaval by Raghava Kavi and Paithancha Vruddhachara that Bahmani Sultan Ahmed Shah Wali provided financial support to Munivyasa for constructing the shrines.

Mahanubhava Sampradaya has remained a flourishing religious sect in Maharashtra till date. It has millions of followers in Maharashtra, particularly in Vidarbha, Marathwada and Khandesh regions.

Mahanubhava Pantha followers worship Lord Krishna and other four gods namely Dattatreya(one-headed), Chakrapani, Govinda Prabhu and Sarvajna Shri Chakradhara.

1. Dattatreya – Avatara of Treta Yuga. Son of Atri and Anasuya. Dattatreya is considered as initial inspiration for the Mahanubhava doctrine.
2. Krishna – Avatara in Dvapara Yuga. Supreme form of Paramesvara. He preached Bhagavad Gita to Arjuna.
3. Chakrapani (Prabhu) – According to the Mahanubhava doctrine, he is the first Avatara of Paramesvara in Kali Yuga. Born at Phaltan in 1121 CE to a Karhade Brahmin family. His Father was named Janakanayaka and mother Janakaisa. Dattatreya transmitted initiation to him when he was at Mahur. He then lived in Dvaraka for 37 years. He gave divine knowledge to 52 purushas. Govinda Prabhu was his foremost disciple.
4. Govinda Prabhu – He is considered as second Avatara in Kaliyuga. Govinda Prabhu was born on Bhadrapada Shukla Trayodashi, 1187 CE at Katsur, Amravati in a Kanva Brahmin family. His father was named Anantanayaka and mother Nemaisa. Shri Chakradhar Swami was disciple of him. He lived in Ruddhapur, Amravati district. Mahanubhav believe that he is still alive.
5. Sarvajna Shri Chakradhara Prabhu – Final Avatara in Kaliyuga. He is regarded as an incarnation of Krishna. Mahanubhava believe that Chakradhara is still alive in Badarikashrama, Himalayas.

Krishnaraj aka Krishnamuni, a Punjabi trader of Khatri caste from Kot Sarang, was the first preacher of Mahanubhava Pantha in Northern India. He was born in the 15th century. He used to visit Berar (Varhad) for his business, there he met Madheraj Buwa from Kavishwar Amnaya and became his disciple. His colleagues and disciples like Santraj and Vidhichandra Sharma activated the dissemination of Mahanubhava doctrine in Punjab. Mahanubhava Pantha soon became well established in Northern India during 16th to 17th century. Mahanubhavas had set up many temples, mathas, pathashalas in Punjab, Upper Doab, Kangra, Kashmir, Northwest Frontiers and as far as Kabul and Kandahar in Afghanistan. Majority of Mahanubhavas migrated to India after the partition of India. Still the major cities in North India like Delhi, Amritsar, Chandigarh, Ludhiana, Hoshiarpur, Jalandhar, Pathankot, Jammu, Ambala, Saharanpur, Meerut, Solan etc. have many Mahanubhava temples and mathas with thousands of followers. Mahanubhava temples are also located at the important holy sites related to Krishna such as Dvaraka, Mathura, and Kurukshetra.

== Publications ==
The Mahanubhava Panth publishes Mahanubhav Sandesh, a newspaper in Marathi and Hindi languages. There are plans to eventual expand the publication to an English edition.

== Notes ==
- "History of Mahanubhava via Dandvat.Com". 31 December 2015.
- "BBC Radio 4 - In Our Time, The Bhagavad Gita".
