= Warwat Khanderao =

Village in Maharashtra

- village
- Country: India
- State: Maharashtra
- District: Buldhana

Languages
  - Official: Marathi
- Time zone: UTC+5:30 (IST)
- Vehicle registration: MH-

Warwat Khanderao is a village, in Sangrampur tehsil of Buldhana district, Maharashtra State, India.

== Geography ==
It is located MH State Highway 173 connecting Shegaon - Warwat Bakal - Bawanbir and Tunki. MDR 2 Major Districts Road 2 connects Paturda - Kondri - Ukali Bk, on east side and Kavtal - Bhendwad - Khandvi on west side.

== Demographics ==
As of 2001 India census, Warwat Khanderao had a population of 1447.

== Description ==
The town post office Postal Index Number ( PIN code) is 444201 and PIN is shared with Jastgaon, Paturda, Wankhed, Kavthal and Kodri post offices.

Some of nearby villages are Tamgaon, Bodkha, Wakana, Ladnapur, Tunki, Sagoda, Palsoda, Dhamangaon, Palsi Zasi, Kolad, Bawanbir, Wadgaon Pr Adgaon, Kolad, Kakanwada Bk, Kakanwada Kh, Pimpri Adgaon, Niwana, Banoda Eklara, Jamod, Durgadatiya, Wankhed, Danapur, Hingani Bk, Raikhed, Belkhed, Gadegaon, Tudgaon, Isapur, Malegaon Bazar,

Nearby towns are Sonala, Akot, Sangrampur, Jalgaon Jamod, Telhara, Shegaon .
