= Paturda =

Village in Maharashtra

- village
- Location in Maharashtra, India Paturda (India)
- Coordinates: 20°57′0″N 76°43′0″E
- Country: India
- State: Maharashtra
- District: Buldhana

Languages
  - Official: Marathi
- Time zone: UTC+5:30 (IST)
- Vehicle registration: MH-

Paturda is a village in Sangrampur tehsil in Buldhana district, Maharashtra state, India.

== Geography ==
It is located on the east of Warwat Khanderao on MH State Highway 173 connecting Shegaon - Warwat Bakal - Bawanbir and Tunki. The nearby National Highway 6 can be reached at Khamgaon via Shegaon or at Nandura via Warwat Bakal, Sangrampur, Jalgaon Jamod.

== Description ==
Agriculture is the main occupation in the nearby area and Paturda has an Agricultural Produce Market Committee (APMC) (Krishi Utpann Bajar samiti) along with the subcommittee at Warwat Bakal, Sonala and Committee at Sangrampur.

The town post office Postal Index Number (PIN code) is 444201 and PIN is shared with Jastgaon, Warwat Khanderao, Wankhed, Kavthal and Kodri post offices.

Some of the nearby villages are Tamgaon, Bodkha, Wakana, Sagoda, Palsoda, Dhamangaon, Palsi Zasi, Kolad, Bawanbir, Wadgaon Pr Adgaon, Kolad, Kakanwada Bk, Kakanwada Kh, Pimpri Adgaon, Niwana, Banoda Eklara, Jamod, Durgadatiya, Wankhed, Danapur, Hingani Bk, Raikhed, Belkhed, Gadegaon, Tudgaon, Isapur, Malegaon Bazar,

Nearby towns are Sonala, Akot, Sangrampur, Jalgaon Jamod, Telhara, Shegaon .

== See also ==
- Wikipedia:Unusual place names
