= Kated =

Village in Maharashtra

- village
- Country: India
- State: Maharashtra
- District: Buldhana

Population (2001)
  - Total: 890

Languages
  - Official: Marathi
- Time zone: UTC+5:30 (IST)
- PIN: 444204

Kated is a village, in Sangrampur tehsil of Buldhana district, Maharashtra State, India.

== Geography ==
It is located on east direction from Banoda Eklara on MH State Highway 173 connecting Shegaon - Warwat Bakal - Bawanbir and Tunki. It lies on the banks of Vaan River.

== Demographics ==
As of 2001 India census, Kated had a population of 890.

== Description ==
The town post office Postal Index Number (PIN code) is 444204 and PIN is shared with Bawanbir, Banoda Eklara, Ladnapur, Sonala post offices.

Some of nearby villages are Tamgaon, Bodkha, Wakana, Ladnapur, Tunki, Sagoda, Palsoda, Dhamangaon, Palsi Zasi, Kolad, Banoda Eklara, Wadgaon Pr Adgaon, Kolad, Kakanwada Bk, Kakanwada Kh, Pimpri Adgaon, Niwana, Warwat Bakal, Jamod, Durgadatiya, Wankhed, Danapur, Hingani Bk, Raikhed, Belkhed, Gadegaon, Tudgaon, Isapur, Malegaon Bazar,

Nearby towns are Sonala, Akot, Sangrampur, Jalgaon Jamod, Telhara, Shegaon .
