= Palsoda =

Village in Maharashtra

- village
- Location in Maharashtra, India Palsoda (India)
- Coordinates: 20.9316°N 76.4089°E
- Country: India
- State: Maharashtra
- District: Buldhana

Languages
  - Official: Marathi
- Time zone: UTC+5:30 (IST)

Palsoda is a village, in Sangrampur tehsil of Buldhana district, Maharashtra State, India.

== Geography ==
It is located on ODR 6 Other District Road on the way toward Wadgaon Pr Adgaon – Malegaon Bazar on MH SH 195, in the east direction from Bawanbir, which is on MH State Highway 173 connecting Shegaon, Warwat Bakal, Banoda Eklara, Bawanbir, and Tunki. It lies on the banks of Vaan River.

== Demographics ==
As of 2001 India census, Palsoda had a population of 1236.

== Description ==
Some of nearby villages are Tamgaon, Bodkha, Wakana, Ladnapur, Tunki, Sagoda, Dhamangaon, Palsi Zasi, Kolad, Banoda Eklara, Wadgaon Pr Adgaon, Kakanwada Bk, Kakanwada Kh, Pimpri Adgaon, Niwana, Warwat Bakal, Jamod, Durgadatiya, Wankhed, Danapur, Hingani Bk, Raikhed, Belkhed, Gadegaon, Tudgaon, Isapur, Malegaon Bazar,

Nearby towns are Sonala, Akot, Sangrampur, Jalgaon Jamod, Telhara, Shegaon .
