= Banoda Eklara =

Village in Maharashtra

- Village
- Location within Maharashtra Location within India
- Coordinates: 21.046926°N 76.717213°E
- Country: India
- State: Maharashtra
- District: Buldhana
- Taluka: Sangrampur

Banoda Eklara is a village, in Sangrampur tehsil of Buldhana district, Maharashtra State, India.

== Geography ==
It is located on MH State Highway 173 connecting Shegaon - Warwat Bakal - Bawanbir and Tunki and joins to MH SH 194 there.

This place is also home to a yearly festival held for the worship of Shree Khoteshwar Maharaj.

== Demographics ==
As of 2001 India census, Banoda Eklara had a population of 2903.

== Description ==
The town post office Postal Index Number (PIN code) is 444204 and PIN is shared with Bawanbir, Kated Kolad, Ladnapur, Sonala post offices.

Some of nearby villages are Tamgaon, Bodkha, Wakana, Ladnapur, Tunki, Sagoda, Palsoda, Dhamangaon, Palsi Zasi, Kolad, Bawanbir, Wadgaon Pr Adgaon, Kolad, Kakanwada Bk, Kakanwada Kh, Pimpri Adgaon, Niwana, Warwat Bakal, Jamod, Durgadatiya, Wankhed, Danapur, Hingani Bk, Raikhed, Belkhed, Gadegaon, Tudgaon, Isapur, Malegaon Bazar,

Nearby towns are Sonala, Akot, Sangrampur, Jalgaon Jamod, Telhara, Shegaon.

Eklara Banoda is situated on the banks of the river Kedar, There are also two rivers nearby the village called as Nagzari and Lendi. All three rivers contributes to maintain ground water level for the crops and drinking water. Main occupation of people here is farming. This place is blessed by Shree Sant Khoteshwar Maharaj. There is big temple as well, In summer season there is annual celebration at temple where various spiritual events, Bhajans, Kirtans, etc. takes place. and on the final day of fare Mahaprasad is served which includes dal of mix pulses and Jowar bhakri. People from nearby villages and the people who belong the village comes this time and celebrate. Talking about education, two government schools are there in village. One is Z.P. Marathi Primary School and other is Shri Sant Khoteshwar Maharaj Vidyala. Shri Sant Khoteshwar Maharaj Vidyala was established with great efforts of Shri Shankarrao Madhavrao Bhonde. People from here tend to educated and descent and having simple lifestyle.
