= Palsi Zasi =

Village in Maharashtra

Palshi Zashi
- Village
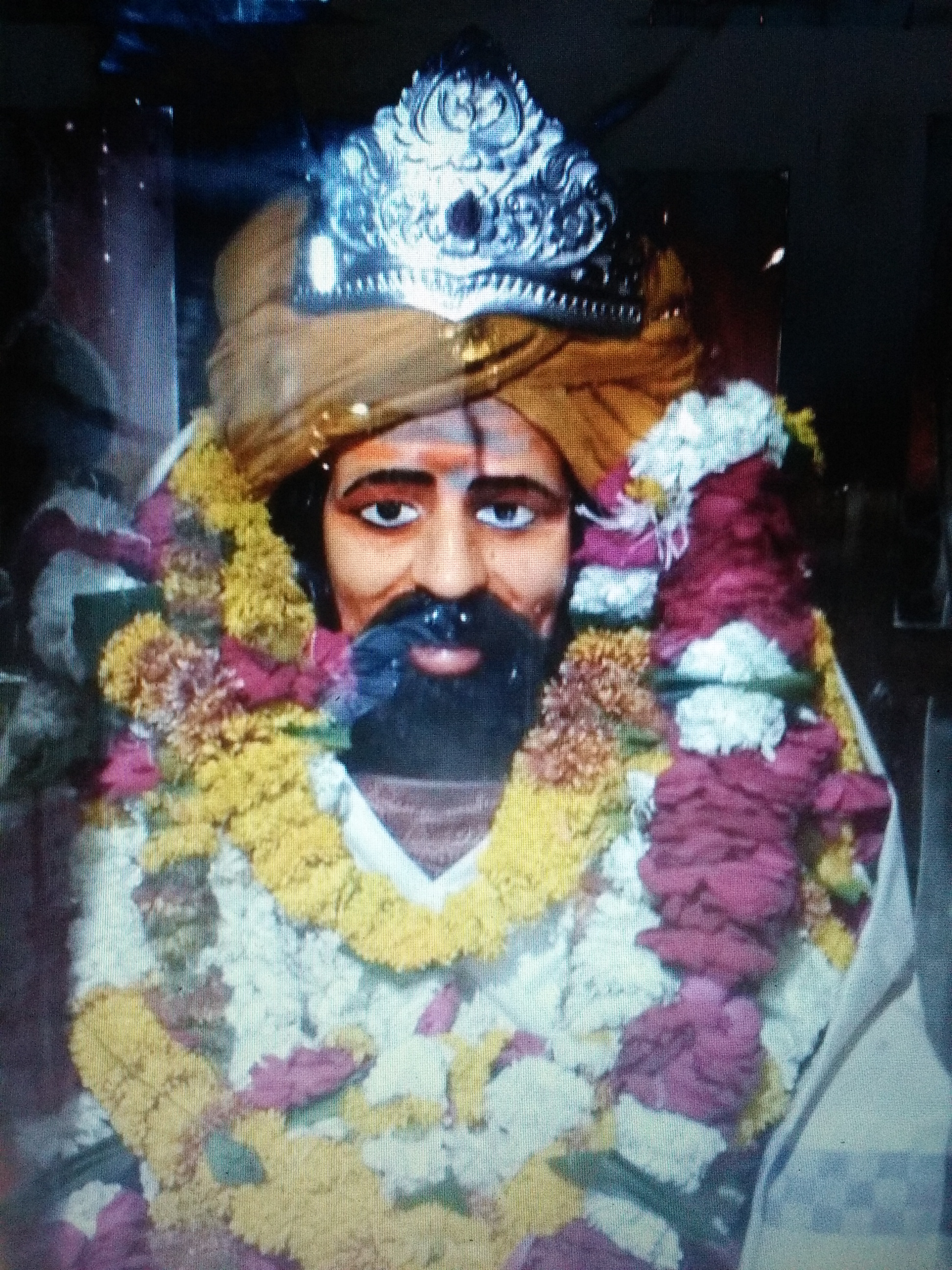
- Shree Shankargiri Maharaj temple

- Location in Maharashtra, India Palshi Zashi (India)
- Coordinates: 21.0585505°N 76.6727257°E
- Country: India
- State: Maharashtra
- District: Buldhana

Government
  - Type: Government of India Republic (democracy)
  - Body: Local Grampanchayat body

Languages
  - Official: Marathi
- Time zone: UTC+5:30 (IST)
- Postal code: 444202
- Vehicle registration: MH-28
- Lok Sabha constituency: Buldhana
- Vidhan Sabha constituency: Jalgaon-Jamod

Palshi Zashi is a village, in Sangrampur tehsil of Buldhana district, Maharashtra State, India. The day of the weekly Athavadi bazaar at the village is Friday.

The main business of village is farming. 80-90% population is served on agriculture. The place of nearby market for farmers is warvat and khamgaon.

The village did not have a primary health center (reported to start from 1 April 2014) and only an anganwadi centre.

The village has two schools:

- Z.P. Primary school up to 7th standard
- S.M.V. Highschool up to 10th standard.

It is famous for the Shree Shankargiri Maharaj temple and the festival of Mahashivratri A 6 to 7 qtls. Of Rodga is made which is a wonder of this place.

There are people of various castes and religions who live together as a family. The village consist of most of the people with the surname Marode. The other festivals celebrated are Shiv Jayanti (since 1983) jijau jayanti; dr. Ambedkar jayanti; mahatma phule jayanti; and cultural festivals as diwali, dasara, holi, pola etc.

The village has a library initiated by the youths of the village started on 23 March 2013.

== Geography ==
It is on north direction of Sangrampur on MH State Highway 195 connecting Jalgaon Jamod - Sangrampur - Malegaon Bazar - Telhara - Warula on MH SH 24. It connects to National Highway 6 at Nandura via Sangrampur - Jalgaon Jamod and at Khamgaon via Shegaon.

== Demographics ==
As of 2001 India census, Palshi Zashi had a population of 3141.

== Description ==
The town post office Postal Index Number ( PIN code) is 444202 and PIN is shared with Warwat Bakal, Kakanwada, Sangrampur post offices.

Some of nearby villages are Tamgaon, Bodkha, Wakana, Ladnapur, Tunki, Sagoda, Palsoda, Dhamangaon, Kolad, Bawanbir, Wadgaon Pr Adgaon, Kolad, Kakanwada Bk, Kakanwada Kh, Pimpri Adgaon, Niwana, Banoda Eklara, Jamod, Durgadatiya, Wankhed, Danapur, Hingani Bk, Raikhed, Belkhed, Gadegaon, Tudgaon, Isapur, Malegaon Bazar,

Nearby towns are Sonala, Akot, Sangrampur, Jalgaon Jamod, Telhara, Shegaon .
