= Kakanwada =

Village in Maharashtra

- village
- Location in Maharashtra, India Kakanwada (India)
- Coordinates: 21°1′55.56″N 76°44′33″E
- Country: India
- State: Maharashtra
- District: Buldhana

Population (2001)
  - Total: 2,472

Languages
  - Official: Marathi
- Time zone: UTC+5:30 (IST)
- PIN: 444202
- Vehicle registration: MH-

Kakanwada is a village, in Sangrampur tehsil of Buldhana district of the Indian state of Maharashtra.

== Geography ==
Kakanwada consists of two census villages Kakanwada Bk and Kanawada Kh. It is split by Vaan River. It is located on MH State Highway 195 connecting Jalgaon Jamod - Sangrampur - - Warwat Bakal on east side and on west side Malegaon Bazar - Telhara - Warula on MH SH 24.

Nearby villages include Tamgaon, Bodkha, Wakana, Ladnapur, Tunki, Sagoda, Palsoda, Dhamangaon, Palsi Zasi, Kolad, Bawanbir, Wadgaon Pr Adgaon, Kolad, Pimpri Adgaon, Niwana, Banoda Eklara, Jamod, Durgadatiya, Wankhed, Danapur, Hingani Bk, Raikhed, Belkhed, Gadegaon, Tudgaon, Isapur and Malegaon Bazar.

Nearby towns are Sonala, Akot, Sangrampur, Jalgaon Jamod, Telhara and Shegaon.

== Demographics ==
As of 2001 India census, Kakanwada Br and Kakanwada Kh had a population of 1462 and 1010, respectively.
