= Warwat Bakal =

Village in Maharashtra

- Village
- Interactive map of Warwat Bakal
- Coordinates: 21.01°N 76.43°E
- Country: India
- State: Maharashtra
- District: Buldhana

Government
  - Type: Panchayati raj (India)
  - Body: Gram panchayat
- Elevation: 295 m (968 ft)

Population (2015)
  - Total: 9,000

Languages
  - Official: Marathi
- Time zone: UTC+5:30 (IST)
- PIN: 444202
- ISO 3166 code: IN-MH
- Nearest city: Shegaon
- Website: maharashtra.gov.in

Warwat Bakal is a Gram Panchayat, in Sangrampur tehsil of Buldhana district, includes in Vidarbha region in the state of Maharashtra, India.

== History ==
Warwat Bakal is a village situated near Satpuda Range and is located around 280.8 km west from the city of Nagpur and 581.8 km east from the city of Mumbai. Also it is an emerging village as it is a connection between the three main cities i.e. Shegaon, Telhara and Jalgaon Jamod which are Nagar Panchayat. As it is situated near Satpuda Parvat i.e. hills so it has extreme climate conditions all year around.

== Geography ==
The Latitude of Warwat Bakal is 20.9258333. The Longitude of Warwat Bakal is 77.7647222. The Latitude and Longitude of Warwat Bakal is 20.9258333 and 77.7647222 respectively. 20.9258333 Latitude and 77.7647222 Longitude can be mapped to closest address of Amravati, Maharashtra, India. And has an elevation of 259 meters. It is located on junction of MH State Highway 173 connecting Shegaon - Warwat Bakal - Bawanbir and Tunki and MH 195 connecting Jalgaon Jamod - Sangrampur - Malegaon Bazar - Telhara - Warula on MH State Highway 24. It connects to MH State Highway 6 at Nandura via Sangrampur - Jalgaon Jamod and at Khamgaon via Shegaon.

== Demographics ==
According to data submitted by Census Warwat Bakal is a large village located in Sangrampur of Buldana district, Maharashtra with total 1345 families residing. The Warwat Bakal village has population of 5735 of which 2937 are males while 2798 are females as per Population Census 2011.

In Warwat Bakal village population of children with age 0-6 is 791 which makes up 13.79% of total population of village. Average Sex Ratio of Warwat Bakal village is 953 which is higher than Maharashtra state average of 929. Child Sex Ratio for the Warwat Bakal as per census is 892, lower than Maharashtra average of 894.

Warwat Bakal village has higher literacy rate compared to Maharashtra. In 2011, literacy rate of Warwat Bakal village was 87.82% compared to 82.34% of Maharashtra. In Warwat Bakal Male literacy stands at 93.69% while female literacy rate was 81.73%.

== Education ==
Warwat Bakal has 6 schools they are as follows:- 1) Shri Nageshwar Maharaj Vidyalaya 2) Sahakar Vidya Mandir and Jr. College 3) Marathi Primary Girls School 4) Z.P Marathi Primary School 5) Z.P Central Marathi Upper Primary School 6) Z.P Urdu Primary School 7) Satpuda English Primary School 8) Eklavya English School 9) Arts and Science Jr. & Sr. College

== Description ==
Agriculture is the main occupation in the nearby area commonly crops like cotton, soya bean and crops such as Jawar, Corn, Sugarcane, Banana are secondary. Warwat Bakal also has Agricultural Produce Market subCommittee(APMC) (Krishi Utpann Bajar samiti) at along with subcommittee at Paturda, Sonala and Committee at Sangrampur.

The town post office Postal Index Number ( PIN code) is 444202 and PIN is shared with Palsi Zasi, Kakanwada, Sangrampur post offices.

Some of nearby villages are Tamgaon, Bodkha, Wakana, Ladnapur, Tunki, Sagoda, Palsoda, Dhamangaon, Palsi Zasi, Kolad, Bawanbir, Wadgaon Pr Adgaon, Kolad, Kakanwada Bk, Kakanwada Kh, Pimpri Adgaon, Niwana, Banoda Eklara, Jamod, Durgadatiya, Wankhed, Danapur, Hingani Bk, Raikhed, Belkhed, Gadegaon, Tudgaon, Isapur, Malegaon Bazar,

Nearby towns are Sonala, Akot, Sangrampur, Jalgaon Jamod, Telhara, Shegaon .
