= Wadgaon Pr Adgaon =

Village in Maharashtra

- village
- Location in Maharashtra, India Wadgaon Pr Adgaon (India)
- Coordinates: 21.0668804°N 76.7692853°E
- Country: India
- State: Maharashtra
- District: Buldhana
- Tehsil: Sangrampur

Languages
  - Official: Marathi
- Time zone: UTC+5:30 (IST)

Wadgaon Pr Adgaon is a village, in Sangrampur tehsil of Buldhana district, Maharashtra State, India.

== Geography ==
It is located on Other District Road on east direction from Banoda Eklara, which is on MH State Highway 173 connecting Shegaon - Warwat Bakal - Bawanbir - Tunki via Kated and Kolad and ODR which further go towards east to Changalwadi. It lies on the banks of Vaan River. Other District Road 2 connects Bawanbir on MH SH 173 and Palsoda on north-west direction and Malegaon Bazar on south East direction.

== Demographics ==
As of 2001 India census, Wadgaon Pr Adgaon has a population of 1305.

== Description ==
The village Postal Index Number (PIN code) is 444204 and is served by Kated Kolad post office. PIN is shared with Bawanbir, Banoda Eklara, Ladnapur and Sonala post offices. There is a Marathi Primary Middle School till class of Seventh Grade.

Some of nearby villages are Kolad, Kated, Kakanwada Bk, Kakanwada Kh, Wankhed, Bodkha, Banoda Eklara, Warwat Bakal, Tamgaon, Dhamangaon, Niwana, Palsi Zasi, Palsoda, Bawanbir, Ladnapur, Tunki, Sagoda, Danapur, Warkhed, Saundala, Hingani Bk, Raikhed, Belkhed, Talegaon Bk, Akoli Ruprao, Ghodegaon, Gadegaon, Thar, Tudgaon, Isapur, Pimpari Adgaon, Malegaon Bazar

Nearby towns are Sonala, Akot, Sangrampur, Jalgaon Jamod, Telhara, Shegaon .
