= Sangrampur, Maharashtra =

Sangrampur
- Town
- Location in Maharashtra, India
- Coordinates: 21.03°N 76.68°E
- Country: India
- State: Maharashtra
- District: Buldhana
- Elevation: 273 m (896 ft)

Languages
  - Official: Marathi
- Time zone: UTC+5:30 (IST)
- PIN: 444202
- Vehicle registration: MH-28

Sangrampur is a Nagar Panchayat, a tehsil of Buldhana district, Maharashtra State, India.

== Geography and climate ==
It is located in the Buldhana district of the Amravati division of the Vidarbha region of the Maharashtra state in India.

It borders the Jalgaon Jamod tehsil to the north, the Shegaon tehsil of the Buldhana District to the south, the Telhara tehsil of the Akola District to the east and the Burhanpur District of the Madhya Pradesh State to the north.

It has an average elevation of 273 metres (898 feet).

The Maharashtra State Highways 173, 194 and 195 pass through the tehsil and connect to the following:

- 173 ( Shegaon - Warwat Bakal - Bawanbir - Tunki ), connecting Khamgaon on National Highway 6 from Shegaon.
- 194 ( Khandvi - Jalgaon Jamod - Tunki - Sonala - Akot - Daryapur - Nandgaon), connecting National Highway 6 at both ends at Nandura on Khandvi side and at Nadgaon
- 195 ( Jalgaon Jamod - Sangrampur - Warwat Bakal - Telhara - Warula) connecting MH SH 194 and MH SH 24.

The town post office Postal Index Number ( PIN code) is 444202 and PIN is shared with Palsi Zasi, Kakanwada, Warwat Bakal post offices.

Sangrampur is located at latitude 21.03° North and longitude 76.68° East. It is at an altitude of 896 ft (273 m) above sea level. Sangrampur has a subtropical steppe climate (Köppen climate classification Bsh) Annual temperatures range from a high of 45.1 °C (113.18 °F) to a low of 5.7 °C (42.26 °F).

Summers starts at end of March and it tills to start of June. Sangrampur lies on the Tropic of Cancer and becomes very hot during the summer, especially in May. It is cooler at night. Humidity is always low below 25%. Highest temperature ever recorded in summer is 45.1 °C in the month of May.

Winters start here in mid October to till February. Winters are very cold at night to warm and breezy in day. Record low temperature was recorded was 5.7 °C. Winter period is pleasant period of the year with blue clear skies.

Because of Monsoon influenced, monsoon starts from early June with heavy rains in the months of July, August and September. The annual rainfall averages 900–950 millimetres (35–37 in) per year. Most of the rainfall occurs in the monsoon season between June and September, but some rain does fall during January and February.

On the north, Sangrampur is bordered by the Satpura Hills and forest region.

== Demographics ==
As of 2001 India census, Sangrampur had a population of 6,506. As of the 2011, Sangrampur had a population of 7,258.

== Sangrampur Tehsil ==
Sangrampur tehsil is part of the Jalgaon Jamod Sub-Division for Revenue of the Buldhana district, along with the Jalgaon Jamod Tehsil.

The tehsil has an area of 594 kilometres (369 mi) and consists of 105 villages, totaling a population of around 97,000

Some of these villages and their population are:

1-Chunkhedi 236
2-Mohokot 109
3-Anyar 14
4-Mangeri 33
5-Ambabarwa 445
6-Rohin Khindki 848
7-Salwan 200
8-Kamod 29
9-Pingli Kh. 621
10-Pingli Bk. 477
11-Saykhed 1875
12-Alewadi 2314
13-Chichari 1174
14-Wasali 2573
15-Hadiya Mahal 487 16-Shivani 1141
17-Karmoda 788
18-Shewaga Kh. 187
19-Malthana Bk. 244
20-Shewaga Bk 169
21-Marod 576
22-Lohagaon Bk. 381
23-Ladnapur 1946
24-Tunki Kh. 476
25-Panchala Pr.jamod 223
26-Panchala Pr.Bawanbir 226
27-Tunki Bk. 4625
28-Sonala 11626
29-Borkhed 278
30-Sangrampur Pr.sonala 184
31-Warkhed 84
32-Sagoda 1987
33-Danapur 104
34-Balhadi 56
35-Khalad Bk. 143
36-Palsoda 1236
37-Bawanbir 5898
38-Umara 782
39-Zasi 555
40-Nimkhed 362
41-Sawala or Sawali 577
42-Dhamangaon 1019 43-Palshi Zasi 3141
44-Warwat Bakal 4976
45-Banoda Eklara 2903
46-Kakanwada Bk. 1462
47-Kated 890
48-Wadgaon Pr Adgaon 1305
49-Kolad 1216
50-Kakanwada Khurd. 1010
51-Mominabad 449
52-Pimpari Adgaon 1400
53-Rajpur 157
54-Akoli Bk. 910
55-Akoli Kh. 251
56-Changefal Bk. 665
57-Changefal Kh. 707
58-Niwana 1487
59-Sangrampur Pr.jamod 6506
60-Tamgaon 1124
61-Pimpri Kathargaon 566
62-Bodkha 1363
63-Nirod 989
64-Bhilkhed 713
65-Wakana 1420
66-Rudhana 2072
67-Chondhi 622
68-Kakoda 669
69-Ukadgaon 353
70-Manardi 719
71-Pimpri Kavthal 461
72-Ringanwadi 570
73-Durgadiatya 1016
74-Wankhed 5378
75-Takleshwar 501
76-Kalamkhed 712
77-Jastgaon 795
78-Neknapur 358
79-Awar 955
80-Ukali Bk. 1216
81-Kodri 1225
82-Paturda Khurd 1564
83-Khel Thorat Paturda 2054
84-Warwat Khanderao 1447
85-Hingana Kavthal 360
86-Kumbarkhed 230
87-Kavthal 2673
88-Itkhed 218
89-Pesoda 1185
90-Bhon 1149
91-Sawali 659
92-Khiroda 1073
93-Khel Dalavi Paturda 1803
94-Khel Bhogal Paturda 2346
95-Deulgaon 235
96-Khel Mali Paturda 1981
97-Takali Panchgavhan 503
98-Kundhegaon 275
99-Aswand 350
. Nimkhed, Salabad, Kalamkhed?

Agriculture is the main occupation within the tehsil and Sangrampur has an Agricultural Produce Market Committee (APMC) (Krishi Utpann Bajar samiti), with a subcommittee at Paturda, Warwat Bakal and Sonala.
