= Ladnapur =

Village in Maharashtra

Coordinates: 21°06′N 77°30′E

- village
- Interactive map of Ladnapur
- Country: India
- State: Maharashtra
- District: Buldhana

Government
  - Type: Panchayati raj (India)
  - Body: Gram panchayat

Languages
  - Official: Marathi
- Time zone: UTC+5:30 (IST)
- Vehicle registration: MH-
- Coastline: 0 kilometres (0 mi)
- Website: maharashtra.gov.in

Ladnapur is a village in Sangrampur tehsil of Buldhana district, Maharashtra State, India.

== Geography ==
It is located in the foothills of the Satpuda Range, and lies on MH State Highway 173.

== Demographics ==
As of the 2001 census of India, Ladnapur had a population of 1,946.

== Post Office and Neighboring Settlements ==
The town post office's Postal Index Number (PIN code) is 444204, which is shared with the Banoda Eklara, Kated Kolad, Bawanbir, and Sonala post offices.

Nearby villages include Shivani, Wasali, Saykhed, Alewadi, Bawanbir, Tunki, Sagoda, Palsoda, Warkhed, Dhamangaon, Palsi Zasi, Kolad, Banoda Eklara, Wadgaon Pr Adgaon, Kakanwada Bk, Kakanwada Kh, Niwana, Kherda Bk, Jamod, Sungaon, Warkhed, Danapur, and Malegaon Bazar.

Nearby towns are Sonala, Sangrampur, Telhara, Shegaon, and Jalgaon Jamod .
