= Bawanbir =

Village in Maharashtra

- village
- Location in Maharashtra, India Bawanbir (India)
- Coordinates: 21°05′N 76°43′E
- Country: India
- State: Maharashtra
- District: Buldhana

Population
  - Total: 6,000

Marathi Languages
  - Official: Marathi
- Time zone: UTC+5:30 (IST)
- Vehicle registration: MH-
- Coastline: 0 kilometres (0 mi)

Bawanbir is a village in Sangrampur tehsil of Buldhana district, Maharashtra State, India.

== Geography ==
It is located at foothill of Satpuda Range and located on MH State Highway 173

== Demographics ==
As of the 2001 India census, Bawanbir had a population of 6000.

== Description ==
The town post office Postal Index Number (PIN code) is 444204 and PIN is shared with Banoda Eklara, Kated Kolad, Ladnapur, Sonala post offices.

Some of nearby villages are Shivani, Saykhed, Alewadi, Ladnapur, Tunki, Sagoda, Palsoda, Warkhed, Dhamangaon, Palsi Zasi, Kolad, Banoda Eklara, Wadgaon Pr Adgaon, Kakanwada Bk, Kakanwada Kh, Niwana, Warwat Bakal, Jamod, Warkhed, Saundala, Raikhed, Malegaon Bazar,

Nearby town are Sonala, Sangrampur, Telhara, Shegaon .
