= State Highway 196 (Maharashtra) =

Road in Maharashtra, India

SH MH 196 at Manegaon as it enters Jalgaon Jamod tehsil. The milestone reads Khandvi is 4 km ahead.

Maharashtra State Highway 196 (MH SH 196) is a State Highway running entirely through the Buldhana district of Maharashtra. It connects Motala on State Highway 176 to Khandvi on State Highway 194. It runs through the Motala, Nandura, and Jalgaon Jamod tehsils of the district.

== Course ==
MH SH 196 starts at Motala along with State Highway 188 and both roads follow the same course from Motala to Tarwadi passing by Advihir, Shemba, Khaira. The road then goes by Mahalungi before it enters Nandura. At Nandura, it takes a northwards turn and crosses National Highway 6 and Mumbai-Howrah rail line. From Nandura going towards Khandvi, it goes by Nimgaon, Yerali, Manegaon, and Zadegaon. It has a bridge over Purna River at Manegaon, where it enters to Jalgaon Jamod Tehsil. It merges with State Highway 194 at Khandvi.
