= National Highway 161H (India) =

National highway in India

National Highway 161H
- Map of National Highway 161H in red

Route information
- Auxiliary route of NH 61
- Length: 28 km (17 mi)

Major junctions
- North end: Jalgaon Jamod
- South end: Nandura

Location
- Country: India
- States: Maharashtra

Highway system
- Roads in India; Expressways; National; State; Asian
← NH 161G	→ NH 53

National Highway 161H, commonly referred to as NH 161H, is a national highway in India. It is a spur road of National Highway 61. NH-161H traverses the state of Maharashtra in India.

== Route ==
Jalgaon Jamod - Nandura.

== Junctions ==
NH 161G Terminal near Jalgaon Jamod.
NH 53 Terminal near Nandura.

== See also ==
- List of national highways in India
- List of national highways in India by state
