= Manegaon =

Manegaon may refer to:

- Manegaon, Madhya Pradesh, a town is Jabalpur district, India
- Manegaon, Maharashtra, a village in Buldhana district, India
