= Shivani (disambiguation) =

Shivani (1923–2003) was a Hindi magazine story writer.

Shivani may also refer to:

== People ==
- Parvati, Hindu goddess, First wife of Shiva
- BK Shivani Verma, Indian spiritual teacher
- Shivani Bhatnagar, Indian journalist
- Shivani Kapoor, British Asian model
- Shivani Raja (born 1994), British politician
- Shivani Surve, Indian television actress in Hindi and Marathi

== Places ==
- Shivani, Tarikere, a village in Tarikere taluk, Chikmagalur district, Karnataka state of India

== Films ==
- Shivani, a 2008 Kannada language film
- Senior Inspector Shivani Shivaji Roy, fictional police officer in the 2014 Indian film Mardaani
