= Tunki =

Village in Maharashtra

Coordinates: 21°6′39.69″N 76°41′38.6″E

Tunki is a town in Sangrampur tehsil of Buldhana district, Maharashtra State, India.

== Geography ==
It is located at foothill of Satpuda Range and located on MH State Highway 173 and MH State Highway 194.

== Demographics ==
As of 2001 India census, Tunki had a population of 10,000.

== Description ==
The post office Postal Index Number (PIN code) is 444204 and is served by Sonala post offices. The Satpura hills lie near the village, and the Ambabarva Wildlife Sanctuary is a tourist attraction in the area. People from surrounding villages come to Tunki for food and supplies. Thousands of hectares are cultivated with oranges, bananas, maize and soybean; cotton is the most widely cultivated crop, while mango trees are rarely grown. The Lendhi River, which originates in the Satpura hills, flows through the village and divides it into two parts, Tunki Khurd and Tunki Budruk.

Some of nearby villages are Shivani, Wasali, Chichari, Saykhed, Alewadi, Ladnapur, Bawanbir, Sagoda, Palsoda, Warkhed, Dhamangaon, Palsi Zasi, Kolad, Wadgaon Pr Adgaon, Warwat Bakal, Jamod, Warkhed, Saundala, Raikhed, Danapur,

Nearby town are Sonala, Akot, Sangrampur, Jalgaon Jamod, Telhara, Shegaon .

== Education ==
Following are the schools and colleges in Tunki:

1) Marathi Purv Madhymik School, Tunki

This school has to teach up to 7th class. After that students go to Aadiwasi Madhyamik Vidhyalay Tunki school.

2) Aadiwasi Madhymik Vidhyalay, Tunki

The school offers education up to grade 12, with the arts stream available in grades 11 and 12. Education is free, and books are provided up to grade 8.
