= Dhanora (Mahasiddha) =

Village in Maharashtra

- city
- Location in Maharashtra, India Dhanora (India)
- Coordinates: 21.0426°N 76.4641°E
- Country: India
- State: Maharashtra
- District: Buldana

Languages
  - Official: Marathi
- Time zone: UTC+5:30 (IST)
- Vehicle registration: MH-28

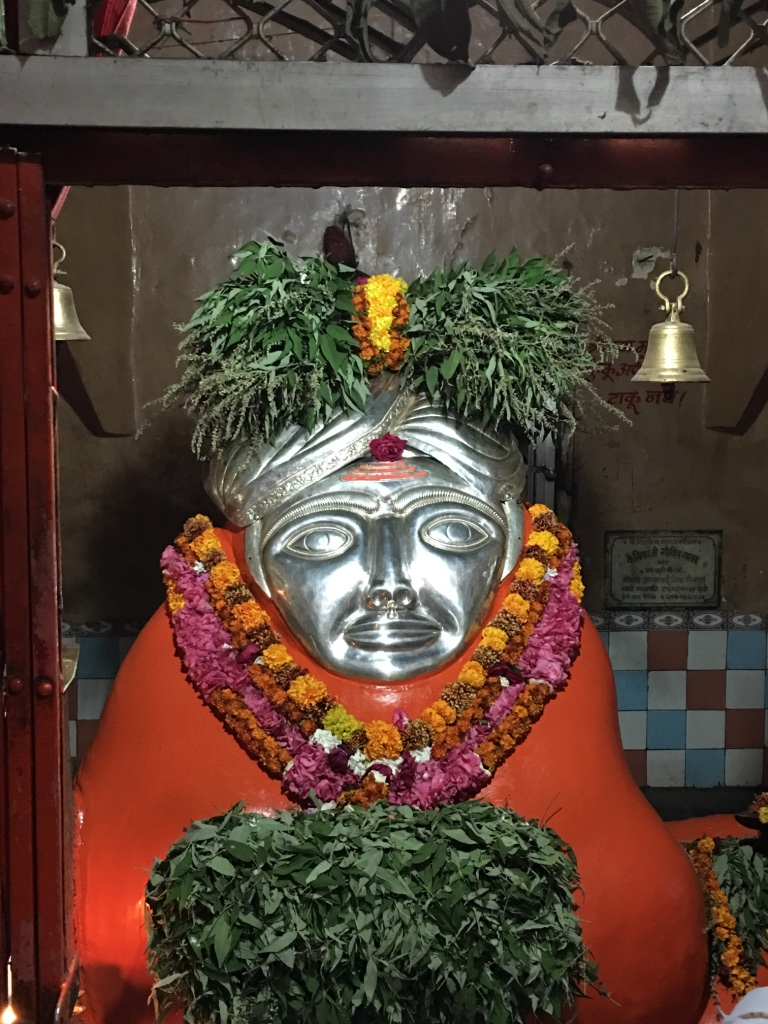
Mahasiddha Maharaj Dhanora

Dhanora is a village in Jalgaon Jamod tehsil of Buldhana district, Maharashtra, India. It is famous for its fair of Mahasiddha Maharaj. It is also known locally as Dhanora (Mahasiddha) to distinguish it from several other villages named Dhanora.

Dhanora is situated 6 km north-west from Asalgaon on Maharashtra State Highway 194. It is connected to Asalgaon by a metalled road.

There is an ancient temple and samadhi of Shri Mahasiddha Maharaj in one of the 84 Siddhas in Dhanora Nagari, which is situated in the holy city of Satpura, situated about 06 km away from Jalgaon Jamod. It is the second largest and eight-day fair of Buldhana district and one of its significant fairs. The district gazetteer originally printed in 1910 notes it as the second largest annual fair in the district. This fair was then also attended by people from distant places.
