= Chandur Biswa =

Village in Maharashtra, India

Chandur Biswa Biswa Bridge
- Village
- Location in Maharashtra, India Chandur Biswa (India)
- Coordinates: 20°53′7″N 76°20′19″E
- Country: India
- State: Maharashtra

Languages
  - Official: Marathi
- Time zone: UTC+5:30 (IST)

Chandur Biswa is a village in Nandura tehsil of Buldhana district, Maharashtra State, India.

== Demographics ==
As of 2001 India census, Chandur Biswa had a population of .

== Administration ==
The village has a gram panchayat. The village's post office PIN code is 443401 and PIN is shared with the Dhanora Vitali, Jigaon, Mamulwadi, and Mominabad post offices.

== Transport ==
The village has a railway station, named Biswa Bridge, located between Nandura and Malkapur on the Bhusawal – Nagpur section of Bhusawal division of Central Railway.
