= Shrikshetra Nagzari =

Village in Maharashtra

- Village
- Country: India
- State: Maharashtra
- District: Buldhana

Government
  - Body: Gram panchayat

Languages
  - Official: Marathi
- Time zone: UTC+5:30 (IST)
- ISO 3166 code: IN-MH
- Vehicle registration: MH-28
- Nearest city: Shegaon, Paras, Gaigaon, Akola
- Website: maharashtra.gov.in

Shrikshetra Nagzari is a village in Shegaon tehsil of Buldhana district, Maharashtra State, India.

There is a small Central Railway Station located between Shegaon and Akola on the Bhusawal – Badnera section of Bhusawal division of Central Railway.

== History ==
Shrikshetra Nagzari (Khamgaon T., RS., p. 844): The village Shrikshetra Nagzari is a station on the Mumbai-Kolkata route of the Central Railway situated at a distance of about 555 km. from Mumbai. The temple for which. the village is famous is about one mile distant from the railway station. The village got its name from the existence there of the ancient temple of Shri Nageshwar and a number of springs flowing in the near proximity. Close by is the river Mohana flowing a bare distance of a mile emanating from one of the springs in the Nagzari and on the banks of which is the math of Gomaji Maharaj. The math contains a tunnel supposedly dug by Shri Gomaji Maharaj for the purpose of carrying on penance. The river Mohana flows eastwards and is met on the way by a number of streamlets in one of which is a pond known as Ramkund. There is another pond known as Gopalkund close by. The water running out from both the ponds flows eastwards to join the river Mohana. Further east is another pond known as Gomukhkund containing excellent potable water. It is said that Shri Gomaji Maharaj used to perform bhajan by seating himself in knee-deep water in the kund. The water flowing out of Gomukh kund meets the river Mohana which turning eastwards joins the river Bordi.

There is a legend prevalent about the Gomukhkund. It says that formerly Shri Gomaji Maharaj used to go for bath to the river Purna (Payoshni) but in his old age he was unable to do so. Even then with great physical forbearance he persisted in going to the Purna. The river Purna was pleased with the devotion of Shri Gomaji Maharaj and gave him a boon that she will appear in the Gomukhkund. She also asked Shri Gomaji Maharaj to throw his walking stick in its flow. The truth or falsehood of this legend may be questioned but it is generally found that whenever the river Purna is flooded a strong current of water emanates out of the Gomukhkund.

The samadhi of Shri Gomaji Maharaj is erected on the Panch-lingi Mal at Shrikheshtra Nagazari. On all the four sides of the samadhi-cum-temple, specious pathshalas have been built. To the north of this samadhi is situated the samadhi of Sadanandgir Maharaj, one of the disciples of Shri Gomaji Maharaj. The samadhi was granted an inam land by the Ex-Nizam Government. At present the devasthan has an inam land admeasuring 415 acres. A fair in honour of Shri Gomaji Maharaj is held on Chaitra Shud. 4 (March-April) which is attended by about 1,000 to 2,000, people.

== Demographics ==
As of 2001 India census, ShriShetra Nagzari had a population of 5000

== Description ==
There are temple of Shri Nageshwar and math of Shri Gomaji Maharaj.

The town post office Postal Index Number (PIN code) is 444203 and PIN is shared with Shegaon, Adsul, Alsana, Bhongaon, Chincholi Karfarma, Janori Nipana, Jawala Budruk, Manasgaon, Rokdiya Nagar, Sagoda, Takli Viro, Zadegaon post offices.

Nearby villages are Jawala, Zadegaon and Paras, Lohara, Kalambi in Akola district.

Nearby towns are Shegaon to the north west, Akola to the south east, Telhara to the north and Balapur to the south.
