= Samdur Sarang =

Indian lyricist, composer, singer

Samdur Sarang (died 2010) was a Marathi lyricist, composer, and singer of Bheem Geet, songs dedicated to Dr. B. R. Ambedkar. He wrote and composed many Bheem Geet including maha baap mhante baap and maya Bhimana maay sonya bharli oTi.

Samdur Sarang was born as Ramdas Maroti Samdur at a village Golegaon near Shegaon in Buldhana district. Inspired by Dr. Ambedkar's conversion to Buddhism and the 22 vows, he rejected his first and middle names that were derived from Hindu mythology and added a name Sarang, a name of his friend, to his name.

Samdur Sarang died in 2010 at Aurangabad.
