= Manegaon, Maharashtra =

Village in Maharashtra

Manegaon
- village
- Location in Maharashtra, India Manegaon (India)
- Coordinates: 20.9451°N 76.4642°E
- Country: India
- State: Maharashtra
- District: Buldhana

Population (2011)
  - Total: 888

Languages
  - Official: Marathi
- Time zone: UTC+5:30 (IST)
- PIN: 443403
- ISO 3166 code: IN-MH
- Vehicle registration: MH-28

Manegaon is a village and Gram panchayat in Jalgaon Jamod tehsil of Buldhana of Maharashtra. Situated on the right bank of river Purna, it serves as a gateway to Jalgaon Jamod tehsil as one travels from State Highway 196 from Nandura to Jalgaon Jamod. Its location attached to a state highway makes it an important place for other villages in vicinity for transportation to other places. From the British Raj to the recent past, it was popularly known as 8th mile, as it was situated at a distance of eight miles from both Nandura and Jalgaon Jamod.

Manegaon is a small village having a population of 888 individuals with total 211 families as per census 2011. Agriculture is the main occupation of people; however, some brick-making plants on the banks of river Purna and some kiosks on the state highway help the economy a bit.

As of 1976 Gazette, Manegaon has around 2,262 acres (915 ha) of agriculture land and 214 agriculturist in 105 houses. Nandura is nearby railway station and Asalgaon is nearby weekly bazar held on Tuesday. There is a primary School, a temple, a library and Cooperative Society.
