= National Highway 161G (India) =

National highway in India

National Highway 161G
- Map of National Highway 161G in red

Route information
- Auxiliary route of NH 61
- Length: 115 km (71 mi)

Major junctions
- South end: Patur
- North end: Khaknar

Location
- Country: India
- States: Maharashtra, Madhya Pradesh

Highway system
- Roads in India; Expressways; National; State; Asian
← NH 161	→ NH 930

National Highway 161G, commonly referred to as NH 161G is a national highway in India. It is a spur road of National Highway 61. NH-161G traverses the states of Madhya Pradesh and Maharashtra in India.

== Route ==
Patur, Balapur, Shegaon, Sangrampur, Jalgaon Jamod, Khaknar.

== Junctions ==
NH 161 Terminal near Patur.
NH 930 Terminal near Khaknar.

== See also ==
- List of national highways in India
- List of national highways in India by state
