= Chandur =

Chandur may refer to:

- Chandur, Telangana, a town in the Nalgonda district in the state of Telangana, India
- Chandur Biswa, a village in the Buldhana district in the state of Maharashtra, India
- Chandur, Maharashtra, a city in the Amravati district in the state of Maharashtra, India
- Chandurbazar, a town in the Amravati district in the state of Maharashtra, India
