= Vaan =

Vaan may refer to:

== People ==
- Laura de Vaan (born 1980), Dutch paralympian
- Michiel de Vaan (born 1973), Dutch linguist
- Vaan Nguyen (born 1982), Israeli poet

== Places ==
- Vaan River, India

== Other ==
- Vaan (Final Fantasy)
- Vaan (film)
