= State Highway 195 (Maharashtra) =

Road in Maharashtra, India

State Highway 195

Route information
- Maintained by MSRDC

Location
- Country: India
- State: Maharashtra

Highway system
- Roads in India; Expressways; National; State; Asian; State Highways in Maharashtra

MH SH 195 or Maharashtra State Highway 195 runs in Buldhana and Akola Districts in India.

It is a road which connects Burhanpur (MP) from one end. It starts from MP - Maharashtra border, takes route as in Buldhana district as Umapur - Rasulpur - Jalgaon Jamod where it briefly merges with MH SH 194. It continues east as Kherda Bk - Sangrampur - Warwat Bakal, where it crosses MH SH 173 and goes eastward as - Salabad - Kakanwada Bk cross Vaan River. It enters Akola district and becomes Malegaon Bazar - Telhara - Ghodegaon - Pathardi - Mundgaon, finally joining MH SH 204 at Warula between Deori and Akot.

== See also ==
- List of state highways in Maharashtra
