= Machchhindrakhed =

Village in Maharashtra

- Village
- Location in Maharashtra, India Machchhindrakhed (India)
- Coordinates: 20.8659°N 76.5882°E
- Country: India
- State: Maharashtra
- District: Buldhana

Languages
  - Official: Marathi
- Time zone: UTC+5:30 (IST)
- Telephone code: 07265
- Vehicle registration: MH-28

Machchhindrakhed is a small village in Shegaon tehsil of Buldhana district of Maharashtra, India. It is quite famous in the locality for the goddess temple there. Jalamb Junction is the nearest railway station.
