= Vaan River =

River in India

Coordinates: 21.0431°N 76.7486°E

The Vaan River is a river of central India. It is a tributary of Purna River, which is a major tributary of Tapti River. It is also spelled as Wan or Van. It is also known as Waanganga.

== Description ==
It rises in the Gawilgarh hills of eastern Satpura Range in Amravati District of Maharashtra state, and flows southward, draining Amravati, Akola and Buldhana region before emptying into the Purna River in Buldhana District of Maharashtra. The watershed lies mostly in these three districts of Maharashtra state.

There is a dam on the river, Wan Dam at Wari in Akola. The following villages are located on the banks of Vaan river, Wari Bhairaogad, Warkhed, Sagoda, Danapur, Wadgaon Pr Adgaon, Kolad, Kated, Kakanwada Bk, Kakanwada Kh, Wankhed, Paturda.

The Maharashtra state highways, MH SH 194 cross the river at Wankhed village and MH SH 195 between Kakanwada Bk and Kakanwada Kh village.

== Places ==
There are many places named after the Vaan river. Some of them are:

- Wan Wildlife Sanctuary - a Wildlife Sanctuary located in Amravati district, is extension of Melghat Tiger Reserve of Project Tiger.
- Wan Road Railway Station (Station Code: WND) on Akola - Khandwa route of South Central Railway.
- Wan Dam at Wari in Akola
