= State Highway 194 (Maharashtra) =

Road in Maharashtra, India

State Highway 194

Route information
- Maintained by MSRDC

Major junctions
- From: Madhya Pradesh
- To: Nandgaon

Location
- Country: India
- State: Maharashtra

Highway system
- Roads in India; Expressways; National; State; Asian; State Highways in Maharashtra

MH SH 194 or Maharashtra State Highway 194 runs in Buldhana, Akola and Amravati Districts.

It starts from Madhya Pradesh and has a route as Dolarkheda - Ichhapur. It enters Buldhana District and passes through Karanwadi - Khandvi - Asalgaon - Wadi Kh - Jalgaon Jamod on MH SH 195 - Jamod - Karmoda - Ladnapur - Tunki on MH SH 173 and Sonala. It crosses the Vaan River and enters into Akola District at Warkhed, then passes through as - Saundala - Hiwarkhed - Adgaon - Akot along the foothills of Satpuda hills, moves towards the plains in Amravati District as Sawara -Wadner Gangai-Daryapur - Kholapur - Dhabhori - Valgaon - Revsa and finally joins Hajira - Kolkata National Highway 6 at Nandgaon.

== See also ==
- List of state highways in Maharashtra
