= Jigaon =

Village in Maharashtra

- Village
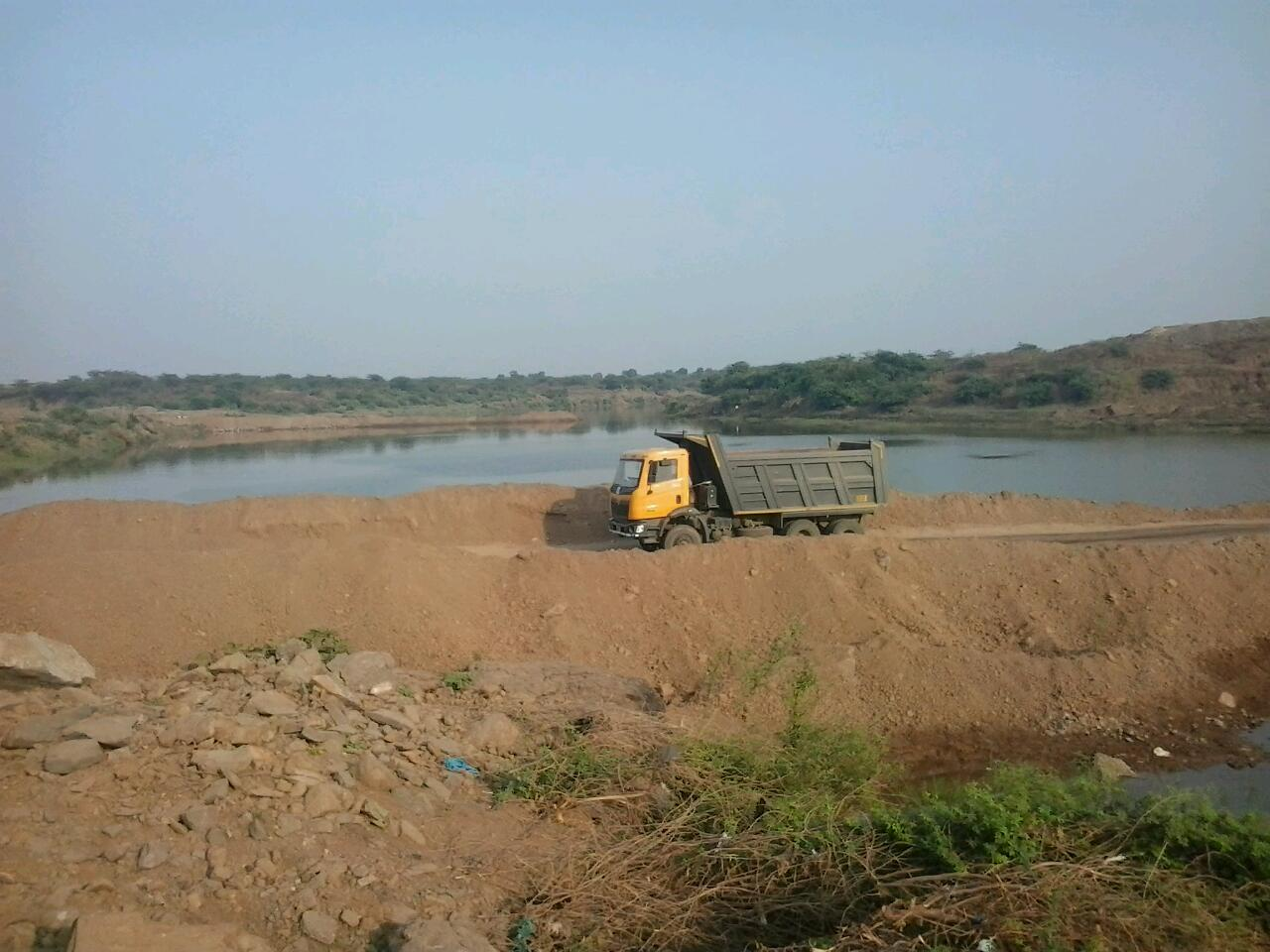
- Jigaon project under construction on Purna River.

- Location within Maharashtra
- Coordinates: 20°55′40″N 76°23′20″E
- Country: India
- State: Maharashtra
- District: Buldhana
- Tehsil: Nandura

Jigaon is a village in Nandura tehsil of Buldhana district of Maharashtra. A major project is being built on Purna River.
