= Shivani, Tarikere =

- village
- Location in Karnataka, India Shivani, Tarikere (India)
- Coordinates: 13.816244°N 76.033287°E
- Country: India
- State: Karnataka
- District: Chikkamagaluru

Languages
  - Official: Kannada
- Time zone: UTC+5:30 (IST)
- PIN: 577549
- Telephone code: 08261

Shivani is a hobli (PIN-577549) in Ajjampura Taluk, Chikkamagaluru District, Karnataka, India.

Before the dawn of the bore-well era, the community well (known in Kannada as "Gopinathana Baavi", a historic landmark) was the primary source of drinking water in the village.

Shivani Kere, a small reservoir/lake located on the northern edge of the village, is the principal body of water in the Shivani basin. However, this reservoir almost dries up during the summer months.

There are several Hindu temples located within the village, some of them being Veeranjaneya, Beeralingeshwara, Keresanthe, Laxmidevi, Revanasiddeswara, Bhandimaramma, Gosappa, Gullamma, Kedareswara, Satyanarayana, Banashankari temple, Kupendra Swamy, and Rudreshwara temple.

The Car Festival of Anjaneya Swamy (also known as Anjaneyana Theru/Ratha or Hanumappana Theru) and Gullammana Habba are the popular annual events.

Some of the most notable parts of Shivani include Anjaneya Temple Road, Camp Road, Ganeshana Beedhi, MG Road, Main Street, Tank Road, and Banashankari Street.

== Facilities ==
- Government primary health centre
- Government veterinary dispensary
- High school
- Junior college
- Police outpost
- Post office
- A branch of the Corporation Bank
- Peoples Convent

== Railway station ==
Shivani (SHV) Railway Station is located almost two kilometres east of Shivani town and one kilometer west of Bandre village and falls within the Mysore Division of the South Western Railway Zone of Indian Railways. This railway station was the watering station for all the steam engines during the meter gauge when the steam engines existed. All the trains stopped here to fill water for the further journey. This station has a 10,000-litre-capacity overhead tank built in 1934.

Several passenger trains make a stop at this railway station. From here one can catch direct trains to go to places like Bangalore and Davangere. The other closest railway stations are Ajjampura (towards Bangalore) and Hosadurga Road (towards Chikkajajur).

Shivani Railway Station is a commercial location and has several wholesale and retail businesses.

Bukkambudhi is an important place within Shivani Hobli and is about 4 kilometres west of Shivani. Naranapura is one of the large mandal panchayaths in Shivani. About 5000 people live there. Bankanakatte and Menasinakayihosally are including in the panchayath.

'Thyagadakatte' is also one of the large mandal panchayath in shivani. About 2000 people live there. Bandre and Banur are included there. Bandre is in Thyagadakatte Panchayath in Shivani. About 600 people live there. Beeranahalli and Shivani railway station are including Thyagadakatte panchayath. In Bandre main temples include the Thimmappa temple and the Basavanna templs.
