= Khandvi =

Village in Maharashtra

- Village
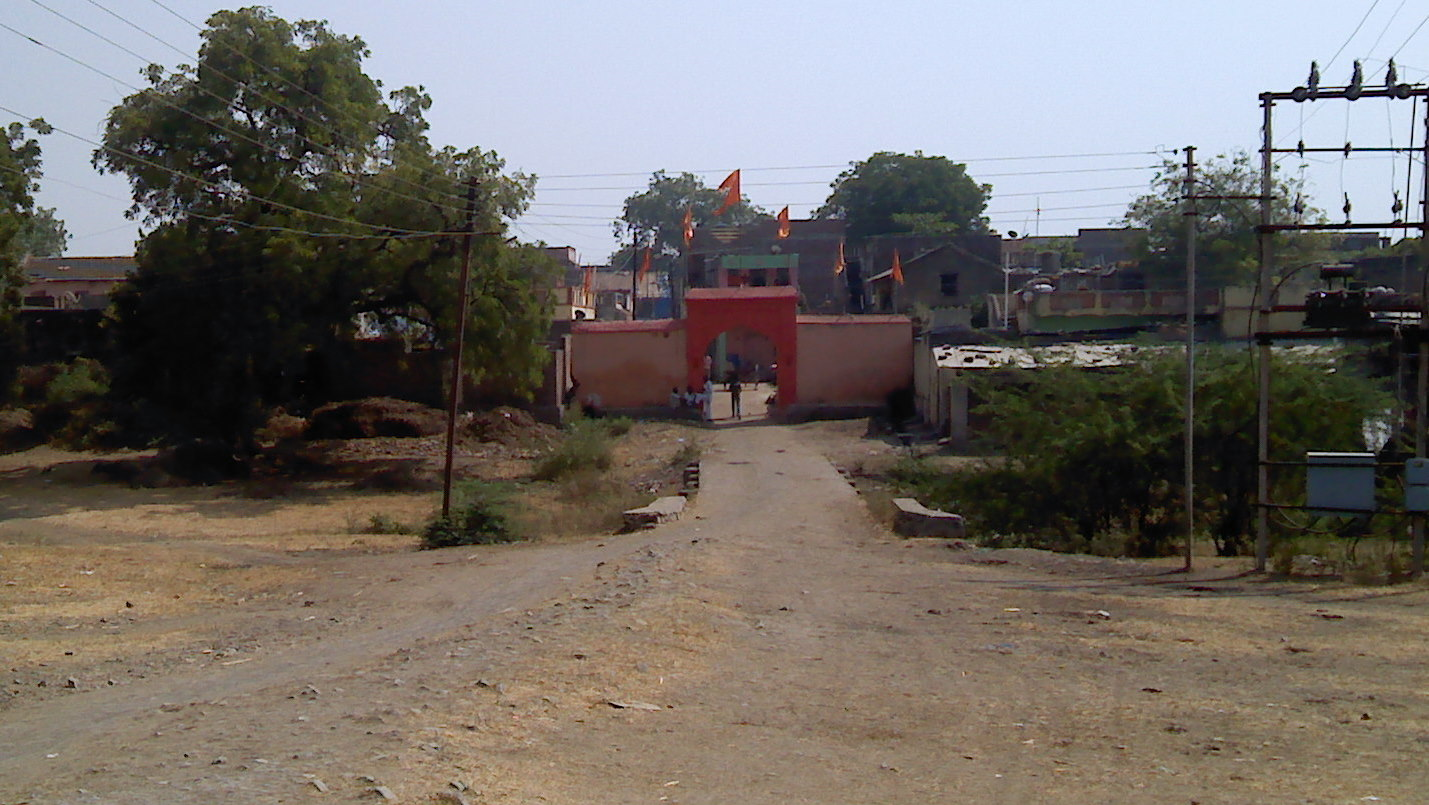
- Entrance of the Khandvi village

- Location in Maharashtra, India Khandvi (India)
- Coordinates: 20.9725°N 76.4782°E
- Country: India
- State: Maharashtra
- District: Buldana

Languages
  - Official: Marathi
- Time zone: UTC+5:30 (IST)
- Postal code: 443403
- Vehicle registration: MH-28

Khandvi is a village in Jalgaon Jamod tehsil of Buldhana district, Maharashtra.

== Location ==
Situated on the confluence of State highways 194 and 196, it serves as an important juncture connecting the Jalgaon Jamod tehsil of Buldhana district to the Muktainagar tehsil of the adjacent Jalgaon Khandesh district.

== Demographics ==
=== Employment ===
The main occupation of the village is agriculture.

== Places of Importance ==
There is a temple of Gajanan Maharaj, created on the land donated by Shree Nitin Dnyandeo Pachpor. It is also the birthplace of Mr. Pushkar Pachpor
