= Manegaon, Madhya Pradesh =

Manegaon industrial area
- Census town
- Location in Madhya Pradesh, India Manegaon (India)
- Coordinates: 21.85°N 80.25°E
- Jabalpur division Country: India
- State: Madhya Pradesh
- District: Balaghat

Government
  - Body: panchayat
- Elevation: 298 m (978 ft)

Population (2001)
  - Total: 9,174

Languages
  - Official: Hindi
- Time zone: UTC+5:30 (IST)
- ISO 3166 code: IN-MP
- Vehicle registration: MP

Manegaon is a census town in Balaghat district in the Indian state of Madhya Pradesh. Total papulation :2045 House hold 465

Manegaon Population by Sex

There are total of 989 male person's & 1056 Females & a total Number Of 225 children's below 6 year in Manegaon The percentage of male population Is 48.36% The percentage of female population is 51.64% The percentage of child population is 11.00%

== Geography ==
Manegaon is located at 21.85°N 80.25°E. It has an average elevation of 298 metres (977 feet).

== Demographics ==
As of 2001 India census, Manegaon had a population of 9174. Males constitute 52% of the population and females 48%. Manegaon has an average literacy rate of 78%, higher than the national average of 59.5%: male literacy is 83%, and female literacy is 72%. In Manegaon, 10% of the population is under 6 years of age.
