= Sonala =

- Town
- Location in Maharashtra, India Sonala (India)
- Coordinates: 21°07′29.5″N 76°44′24.7″E
- Country: India
- State: Maharashtra
- District: Buldhana
- Tehsil: Sangrampur

Population (2001)
  - Total: 11,626

Languages
  - Official: Marathi
- Time zone: UTC+5:30 (IST)
- PIN: 444204
- Vehicle registration: MH

Sonala is a town in Sangrampur tehsil of Buldhana district, Maharashtra State, India. As of 2001 India census, it had a population of 11,626.

== Geography ==
It is located at foothill of Satpuda Range and located on MH State Highway 194, 45 km north from Shegaon which is the holy place of Hindus of Saint Shri Gajanan Maharaj. Basically, Sonala is surrounded by Ambabarwa Sanctuary which is famous for wolves, bears, deer, etc. The town post office Postal Index Number ( PIN code) is 444204 and PIN is shared with Banoda Eklara, Kated Kolad, Ladnapur, Bawanbir post offices.

Some of nearby villages are Rohinkhidaki, Vari Hinuman, Pingali, Ambabarwa, Saykhed, Alewadi, Chinchli, Wasali, Ladnapur, Tunki, Sagoda, Palsoda, Bawanbir, Dhamangaon, Palsi Zasi, Kolad, Banoda Eklara, Akola and Wadgaon Pr Adgaon.

== Demographics ==
Sonala is the biggest town with largest population in Sangrampur tehsil contributing 20 percent population of the Sangrampur tehsil which is more than that of tehsil town Sangrampur. As far as the language is concerned, Warhadi (a dialect of Marathi) is a popular local language. Other languages spoken are Urdu and Hindi. Dabhade was Patil(Governing) family of Sonala.

== Main sights ==
The Wari Hanuman temple is located 6 km north-east to Sonala. The dam Hanuman Sagar, which is a popular tourist spot, is also nearby the town.

== Education ==
Sonala has high school up to 10 std and Junior college in art and science faculty. Sonala is lagging behind in education as compared to nearby area. The name of the high school is Shri saint Sonaji Maharaj High School. Computer Education : Gurumauli Computers, Near Post Office Sonala.

== Economy ==
Agriculture is the main occupation in the nearby area and Sonala has Agricultural Produce Market subCommittee (APMC) (Krishi Utpann Bajar samiti) at along with subcommittee at Paturda, Warwat Bakal and a committee at Sangrampur. Sonala is also known for the working place of "Shree Saint Sonaji Maharaj".. Orange farm is the main source of economy ...the from sonala is going to Bangalore, Mumbai, Bhusawal, and other city for sale
