= Malegaon Bazar =

Village in Maharashtra

- village
- Interactive map of Malegaon Bazar
- Coordinates: 21°02′02″N 76°47′34″E
- Country: India
- State: Maharashtra
- District: Akola

Languages
  - Official: Marathi
- Time zone: UTC+5:30 (IST)
- Vehicle registration: MH-
- Coastline: 0 kilometres (0 mi)

Malegaon Bazar is a village, in Telhara tehsil of Akola district, Maharashtra State, India.

== Geography ==
It is located on MH State Highway 195 connecting Jalgaon Jamod - Sangrampur - - Warwat Bakal, Kakanwada on east side and on west side Telhara - Warula on MH SH 24.

== Demographics ==
As of 2001 India census, Malegaon Bazar had a population of 1410.

== Description ==
The town post office Postal Index Number ( PIN code) is 444108 and PIN is shared with Telhara, Belkhed, Panchagavan post offices.

Nearby towns are Sonala, Akot, Sangrampur, Jalgaon Jamod, Telhara, Shegaon
