= State Highway 173 (Maharashtra) =

Road in Maharashtra, India

State Highway 173

Route information
- Maintained by MSRDC

Major junctions
- From: Shegaon
- To: Tunki

Location
- Country: India
- State: Maharashtra

Highway system
- Roads in India; Expressways; National; State; Asian; State Highways in Maharashtra

MH SH 173 or Maharashtra State Highway 173 runs in Shegaon and Sangrampur tehsils of Buldhana of Maharashtra State in India.

It starts from Shegaon and takes a northerly route as Kalkhed - Manasgaon, and crosses the Purna River. It enters Sangrampur tehsil and becomes Khiroda, Warwat Khanderao. It crosses with MH SH 195 at Warwat Bakal and continues north towards Banoda Eklara - Bawanbir, meeting MH SH 194 at Tunki.

From Tunki a Major District Road MDR 1 goes to Wasali and later to Ambabarwa Wildlife Sanctuary.

The nearest connection to Indian National Highway network is with National Highway 6 at Khamgaon via MH SH 24

== See also ==
- List of state highways in Maharashtra
