= Nandura =

- City
- Location in Maharashtra, India
- Coordinates: 20°50′00″N 76°27′35″E
- Country: India
- State: Maharashtra
- District: Buldhana
- Elevation: 262 m (860 ft)

Population (2011)
  - Total: 135,000
- Postal Index Number: 443404
- Telephone code: +91-07265

Nandura (नांदुरा) is a city in Buldhana district in Maharashtra state. Nandura is the headquarters of Nandura taluka. Nandura is situated on the National Highway 53 and the Howrah–Nagpur–Mumbai line. The municipality of Nandura was established during the British Raj in 1931.

Banaits were the main leaders at ancient times. Lanjulkars were prominent beer and wine suppliers. Sharmas are the famous panipuri seller from a decade. The place is major supplier of milk products to all nearby areas.

== History ==
According to 'Mahagovind Sutant' a Buddhist novel, Nandura was established in ancient time. It was capital of Asmaka kingdom (one of the 16 ancient kingdoms (Mahajanapadas) in ancient India (2600 B.C.). Nandura was called as 'Potan' at that time.

According to Ain-i-Akbari, Nandura was an integral part of Gulshan-e-Berar in the Medieval era, beginning in the Khalji dynasty until the Mughal Empire. Various links to Peshwa are also found in the history of Nandura. Nawab Amirullah Khan was one of the Nawab in the late 1800 AD history of Nandura. It relates to Nizam of Hyderabad also known as Dakkan. Nandura was under jurisdiction of Akola district. After August 1905, it became the part of Buldhana district.

== Geography ==
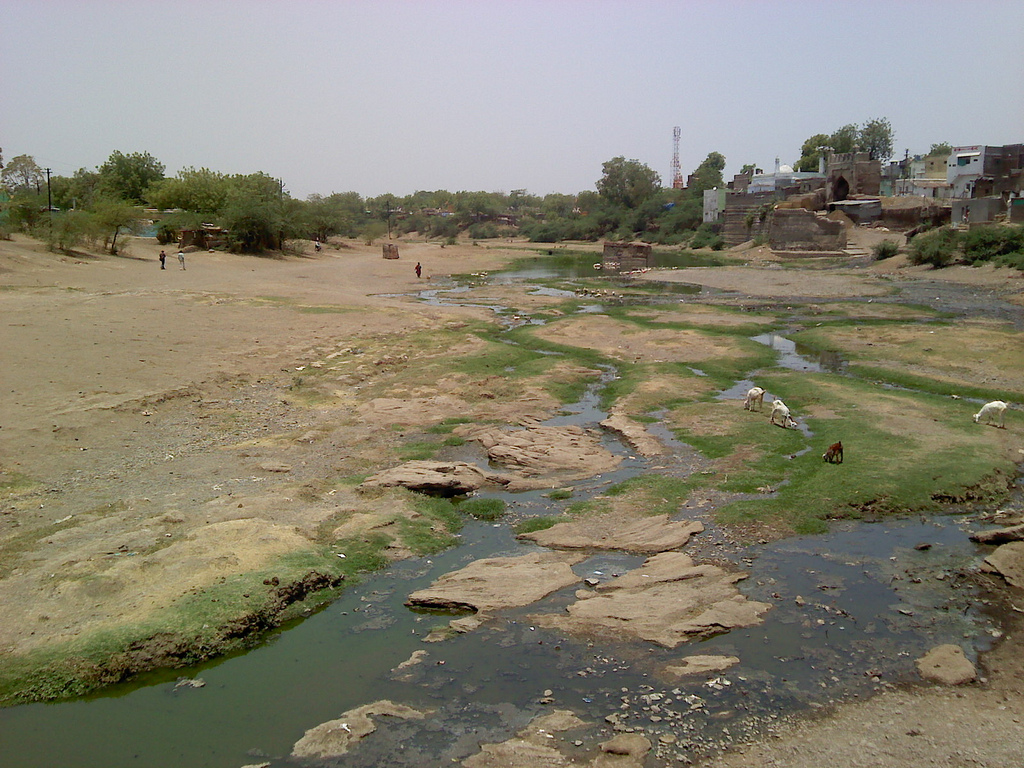
River Dnyanganga at Nandura

Nandura was a twin city; Nandura Budruk (Greater Nandura) is separated from the original village of the same name, Nandura Khurd (Little Nandura) by the Dnyanganga River, though the village is officially considered as the part of Nandura itself.actually Nandura get extended by another 5 small villages named as Ahamadpur, Mahamadpur, Peth, Khudavantpur, New Jigaon and Kolamba. It has become bigger city with Jigaon Project as one of the bigger dam so around 20 villages which are affected by this project totally depend upon this city and making it as bigger trade hub. The city expanded towards Nimgaon in the North, Wadi in the west, Aamsari in the east and Kolamba in the South.

It connected by Rail network Howrah–Nagpur–Mumbai line and National Highway 53. Nandura has a 105 feet tall statue of Hanuman biggest Hanuman statue in the world, this hanuman statue is noted in Limca Book of Records and a historical place named Ambadevigad about 1000 year ancient.

== Demographics ==
As of 2011 census of India Nandura had a population of nearly 37469. The gender ratio of males to females was 51:49. Nandura had a literacy rate of 69%, higher than the national average of 59.5%: male literacy is 76%, and female literacy is 62%. A total of 14% of the population were under 6 years of age.

Year	Male	Female	Total Population	Change	Religion (%)							
Year	Male	Female	Total Population	Change	Hindu	Muslim	Christian	Sikhs	Buddhist	Jain	Other religions and persuasions	Religion not stated
2001	19100	18369	37469	-	63.663	28.143	0.125	0.035	7.126	0.859	0.024	0.024
2011	22848	21571	44419	0.185	60.891	30.696	0.063	0.023	7.413	0.795	0.047	0.072

== Transport ==
Nandura is situated on National Highway 53 (India) i.e. Hazira-Dhule-Kolkata National Highway. It is also a railway station of Central Railway on the Howrah–Nagpur–Mumbai line.

== Economy ==
Nandura has oil mills, dal mills, and a joining and pressing industry along with handlooms. In older days, Nandura was known for cotton products like ropes, handmade cotton dhoti, and Sari, etc. Nandura's milk products like Khava are famous for its quality and taste and is transported daily to several adjoining districts.

Nandura also acts an important trade center in the region. Prominent goods traded include Wheat, Sorghum, Soybean, Legume, Cotton, Onion, Chili pepper, Lemon and several vegetables like Eggplant.

== Nandura tehsil ==
Nandura tehsil is part of Malkapur Sub-Division of Buldhana district, along with Motala and Malkapur tehsils. It has its borders with Malkapur tehsil in the west, Jalgaon Jamod tehsil in the north, Khamgaon and Shegaon tehsils in the east, and Khamgaon and Motala tehsils in the south. Nandura tehsil has an area of 462 square km and consisting of 103 villages with a population of around 1,98,000.

Some of these villages are Chandur Biswa, Wadner, Naigaon, Kumbekhal, Nimgaon, Rampur, Narayanpur, Takli (Wachpal), Jigaon, Palsoda, Patonda, Mamulwadi, Higana Gavhad, Mominabad, Sawargaon, Sirsodi, Yerali, Belad (Sabe), Alampur, Narakhed, Pimpalkhuta Dhande, Rasulpur, Amboda, Amsari, Wadali, Dighi, Khumgaon, Dahigaon, Matoda, sonaj, Danora, Kati, Dahivadi, Potali, Medhali, Wadi, Lonwadi, Malegaon Gond, Wasadi, Khadatgaon, Mahalundi, Jawala Bazar, Takarkhed, Fuli, Khaira, and Shemba, Pimpri Adhao, Kokalwadi, Dighi Wadgaon, Vitali, and Nimbola

== Hanuman statue ==
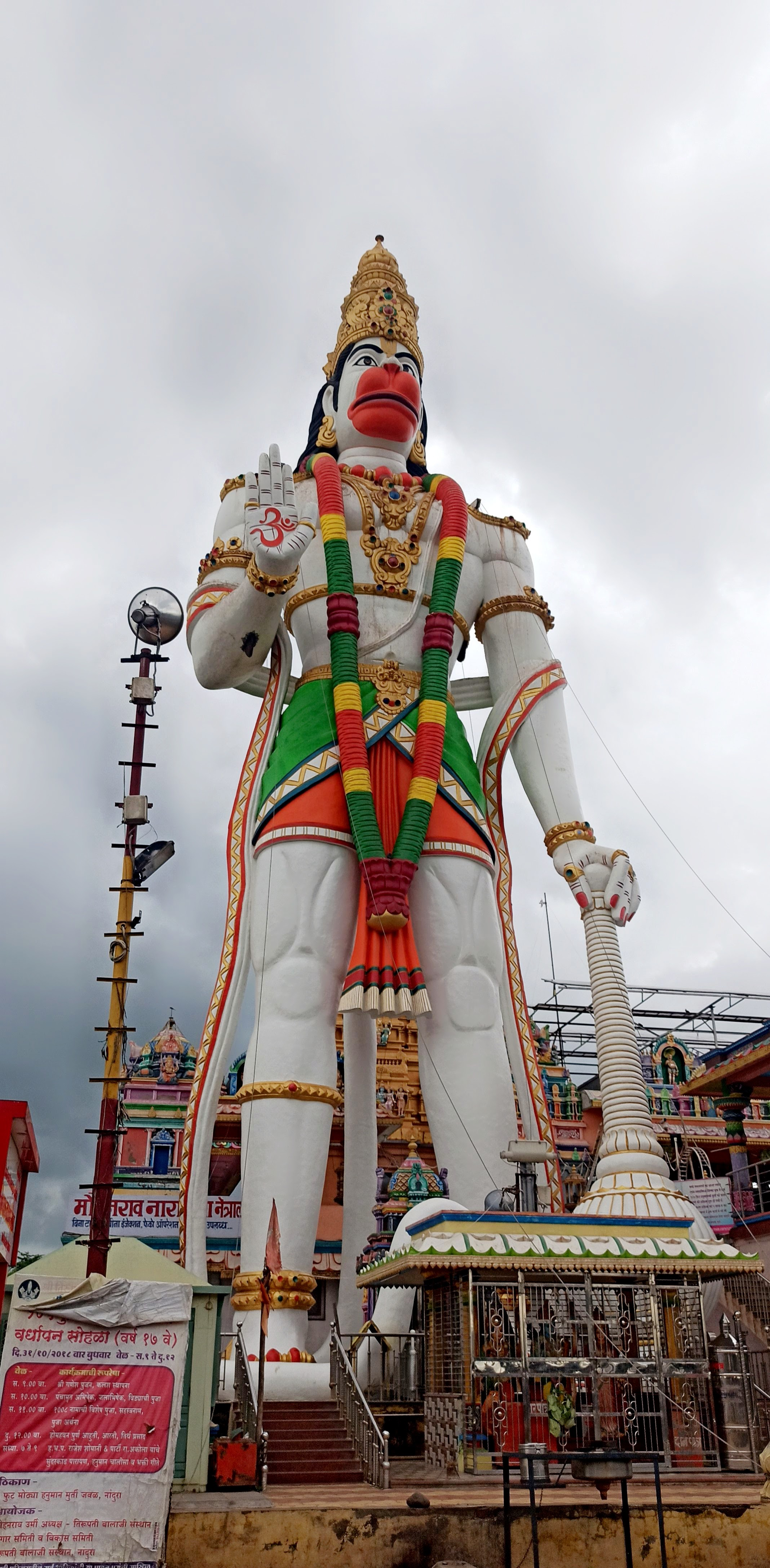
105 Feet High Hanuman-Murti, Nandura

The 105-feet statue of Hanuman is the main tourist attraction in the town. It is one of the highest Hanuman statues in India, along with Hanuman Murti located in Shahjahanpur, Uttar Pradesh. It is also mentioned in Limca Book of Records. It is situated on the National Highway 53 (India). Lord Hanuman is the son of Vayu and Anjani (the woman of highly spiritual native). Lord Hanuman is called Pawansut (Son of Air) and Anjaniputra (Son of Anjani).
About Murti :

- Height:105 ft.
- Chest girth:70 ft.
- Base:30 ft.
- Tail:70 ft.
- Arm:25 ft.
- Mace 30 ft.
- Sole 34 ft.
- Nail of sole:15 ft.
