= Wankhed =

Village in Maharashtra

Wankhed Wankhed-Paturda Wankhed-Durgadaiyita
- village
- Location in Maharashtra, India Wankhed (India)
- Coordinates: 20.990°N 76.737°E
- Country: India
- State: Maharashtra
- District: Buldana

Population
  - Total: 10,000

Languages
  - Official: Marathi
- Time zone: UTC+5:30 (IST)
- PIN: 444201
- Telephone code: 07266
- Vehicle registration: MH-28
- Nearest city: Shegaon/akola
- Lok Sabha constituency: Buldhana
- Vidhan Sabha constituency: Jalgaon Jamod

Wankhed is a small village situated on the bank of the Vaan River in Maharashtra, India.

Wankhed is situated at the bank of the river Wan (Wan nadi) in the Buldhana district of Maharashtra state (Vidarbha region). The river divides the region in two different places; one called Wankhed and other called Durgadaitya, resulting in that Wankhed is sometimes referred to as Wankhed-Durgadaitya. Another close-by place is the village of Paturda, so Wankhed can be known as Wankhed-Paturda.

It is known for famous Jagdamba Devi temple. In the month of Paush there is big fair and celebration of Jagdamba Devi. All the people who are transfer in cities for work come on this occasion. The population of the village is approximately 9,000. The primary occupation of the village is farming; main crops include cotton, pulses and/or soybeans. There is a big government PHC in the nearby area. There are some primary facilities such as a hospital, pharmacy and school. The houses are predominantly old fashioned (some modernisation is also taking place in the new generation).

== See also ==
- Place names considered unusual
