= Wakana =

- Gender: Female

Origin
- Origin: Japanese
- Meaning: Different meanings depending on the kanji used

Wakana (written: 若菜, 若奈, 和可菜, 和可那, 和佳奈 or わかな in hiragana) is a feminine Japanese given name. Notable people with the name include:

- Wakana Abe (安部 若菜; born 2001), Japanese idol of idol group NMB48
- Wakana Aoi (葵 わかな; born 1998), Japanese actress and former idol
- Wakana Fukushima (福島 和可菜; born 1982), Japanese tarento and actress
- Wakana Kabasawa (樺沢 和佳奈; born 1999), Japanese athlete
- Wakana Koga (古賀 若菜; born 2001), Japanese judoka
- Wakana Kuramochi (倉持 若菜), Japanese voice actress
- Wakana Maruoka (丸岡 和佳奈; born 1995), Japanese voice actress and singer
- Wakana Matsumoto (松本 若菜; born 1984), Japanese actress
- Wakana Matsumoto (松本わかな; born 2007), Japanese idol singer and member of Japanese girl group Angerme
- Wakana Mihara (三原 わかな; born 2007), Japanese former idol of idol group Yumemiru Adolescence
- Wakana Miyazaki (宮﨑 若菜; born 2000), Japanese professional kickboxer
- Wakana Nagahara (永原 和可那; born 1996), Japanese badminton player
- Wakana Okuma (大熊 和奏; born 2001), Japanese voice actress and singer
- Wakana Ootaki (大滝 若奈; born 1984), Japanese singer
- Wakana Sakai (酒井 若菜; born 1980), Japanese actress and writer
- Wakana Sonobe (園部 八奏; born 2008), Japanese professional tennis player
- Wakana Uehara (上原 わかな; born 1996), Japanese professional wrestler, former idol and tarento
- Wakana Yamashita (山下 若菜; born 1984), Japanese tarento
- Wakana Yamazaki (山崎 和佳奈; 1965–2026), Japanese actress, voice actress and narrator

== Fictional characters ==
- Wakana Endou (遠藤 若菜), in the manga series Muteki Kanban Musume
- Wakana Gojo (五条 新菜), in the manga series My Dress-Up Darling
- Wakana Sakai, in the anime series Tari Tari
- Wakana Itou, in the anime series Sacred Seven
- Wakana Morizono, in the anime series Pretty Rhythm: Rainbow Live
- Wakana Shimazaki, in the light novel series "Loner Life in Another World"
