= Tamgaon =

- town
- Location within India
- Coordinates: 16.6535°N 74.3060°E

Area
  - Total: 8.04 km^{2} (3.10 sq mi)
- Elevation: 554 m (1,818 ft)

Population (2011)
  - Total: 5,223
  - Density: 650/km^{2} (1,680/sq mi)

Tamgaon is a Census town situated in Kolhapur district of Maharashtra, India. Kolhapur railway station serves as the

nearest railway station and is located approximately 12 kilometers away from Tamgaon.

== Geography ==
The total geographical area of Tamgaon is 8 square kilometers which makes it the 3rd biggest census town by area in the Kolhapur district.

== Demographics ==
According to the 2011 Indian Census, the Tamgaon town consist of approximately 5,223 people.

== Climate ==
The average rainfall per annum in the town is 1048.5 millimeters. The maximum temperature goes up to 40.8 Celsius and the minimum temperature goes down to 11 Celsius.
