= Jamod =

- village
- Nickname: Viratanagari
- Location in Maharashtra, India
- Coordinates: 21°6′0″N 76°36′0″E
- Country: India
- State: Maharashtra
- District: Buldhana

Government
  - Type: ग्रामपंचायत

Population
  - Total: approx 35,000

Languages
  - Official: Marathi
- Time zone: UTC+5:30 (IST)
- PIN: 443402. (old code- 443406)
- Telephone code: 07266
- Vehicle registration: MH-28
- Coastline: 0 kilometres (0 mi)
- Nearest city: Jalgaon Jamod, Shegaon
- Avg. summer temperature: 42 °C (108 °F)
- Avg. winter temperature: 28 °C (82 °F)
- Website: jamod.in

Jamod is a small town in Jalgaon Jamod taluka in the Buldhana district of Maharashtra.

The name "Jamod" comes from Jaha moze, which means place of enjoyment. Its old name was Virat Nagari. Jamod is situated on the base of the Satpuda hills, which means seven hills together. Jamod has good fertile land for growing bananas, vegetables, and oranges, and all nearby villages are situated on hills. The Avji Sidha Maharaj temple is one of the few famous places around Jamod.

== Demographics ==
Generally the Bari caste is located here, which are the farmers of eating leaves (Nagveli). Every year these people arrange bhandara (common food party) at Bambleshwari (Mahadeo) temple.

== Religion ==
Indradev temple is present only in Jamod in all world. T

== Education ==
- Nagveli Computer Education Center (Pra.Arun S.Hissal)
- The New Life English convent school
- Jana-Muktai primary high school
- Janta Vidyalaya Jamod
- Marathi Purv Madhymik Shala Jamod
- Educational Revolution Academy (Pravin R. Randale's ERA)

The Holy Jamody Church
