= Akot =

City in Akola district, Maharashtra, India

- City
- Location in Maharashtra, India Akot (India)
- Coordinates: 21.1°N 77.06°E
- Country: India
- State: Maharashtra
- District: Akola

Government
  - Body: BJP
- Elevation: 345 m (1,132 ft)

Population (2011)
  - Total: 92,637

Languages
  - Official: Marathi
- Time zone: UTC+5:30 (IST)
- PIN: 444101
- Telephone code: 07258
- Vehicle registration: MH30-

Akot is a city in the Vidarbha Region that lies in the Akola district in the Indian state of Maharashtra.

== Geography ==
Akot is located at 21.1°N 77.06°E. It has an average elevation of 345 metres (1132 feet).

== Demographics ==
According to the 2011 Indian census, Akot had a population of 92,637. Males constitute 52% of the population and females 48%. Akot has an average literacy rate of 70.8%, which is higher than the national average of 59.5%; 74.8% of the males and 66.6% of the females are literate. 15% of the population is under 6 years of age.

Year	Male	Female	Total Population	Change	Religion (%)							
Year	Male	Female	Total Population	Change	Hindu	Muslim	Christian	Sikhs	Buddhist	Jain	Other religions and persuasions	Religion not stated
2001	41806	38920	80726	-	56.915	34.413	0.255	0.026	7.902	0.367	0.011	0.111
2011	47733	44904	92637	0.148	54.608	36.947	0.210	0.017	7.717	0.229	0.067	0.204
