= Jalgaon Jamod =

- City
- Jalgaon (Jamod)
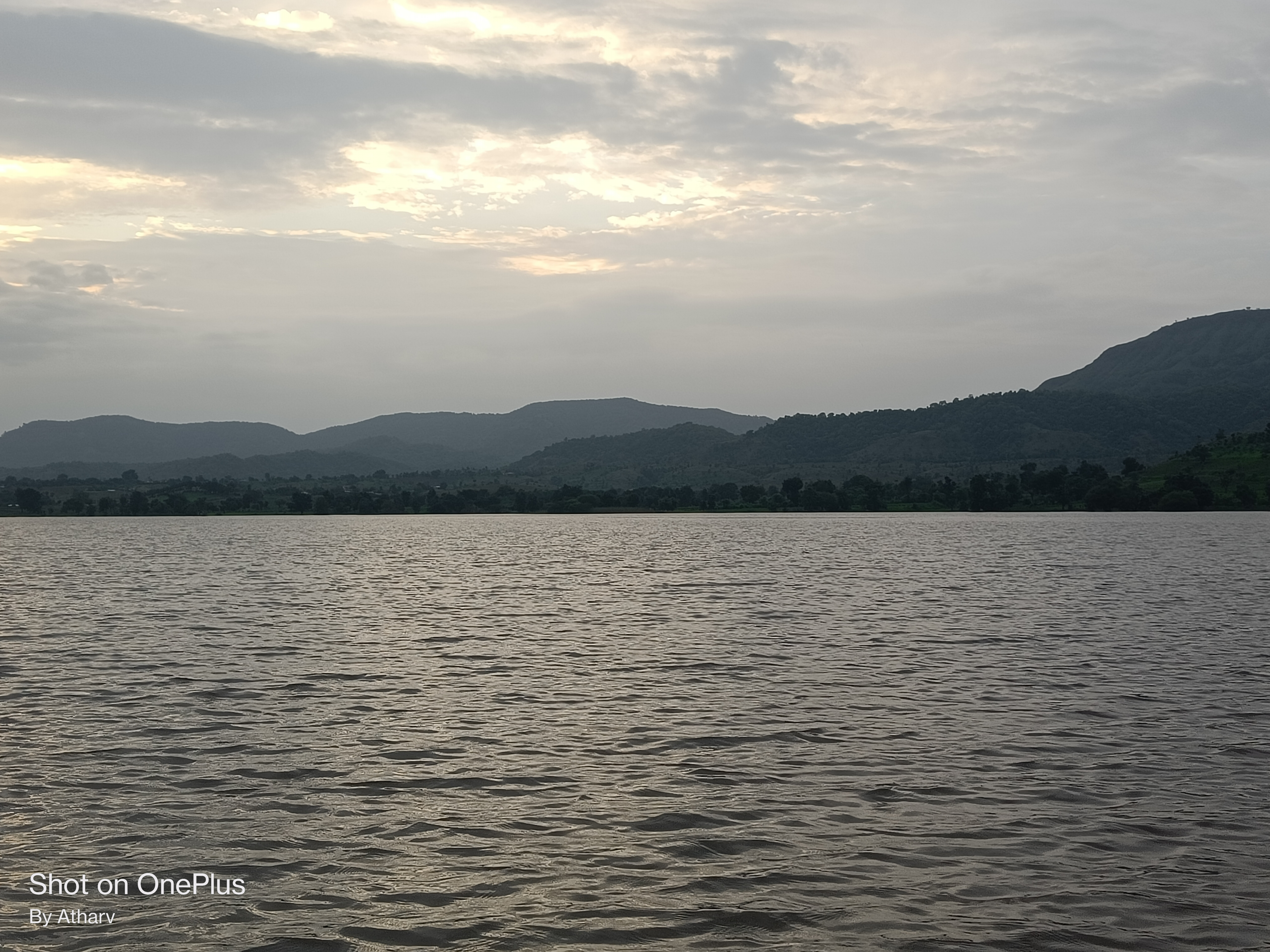
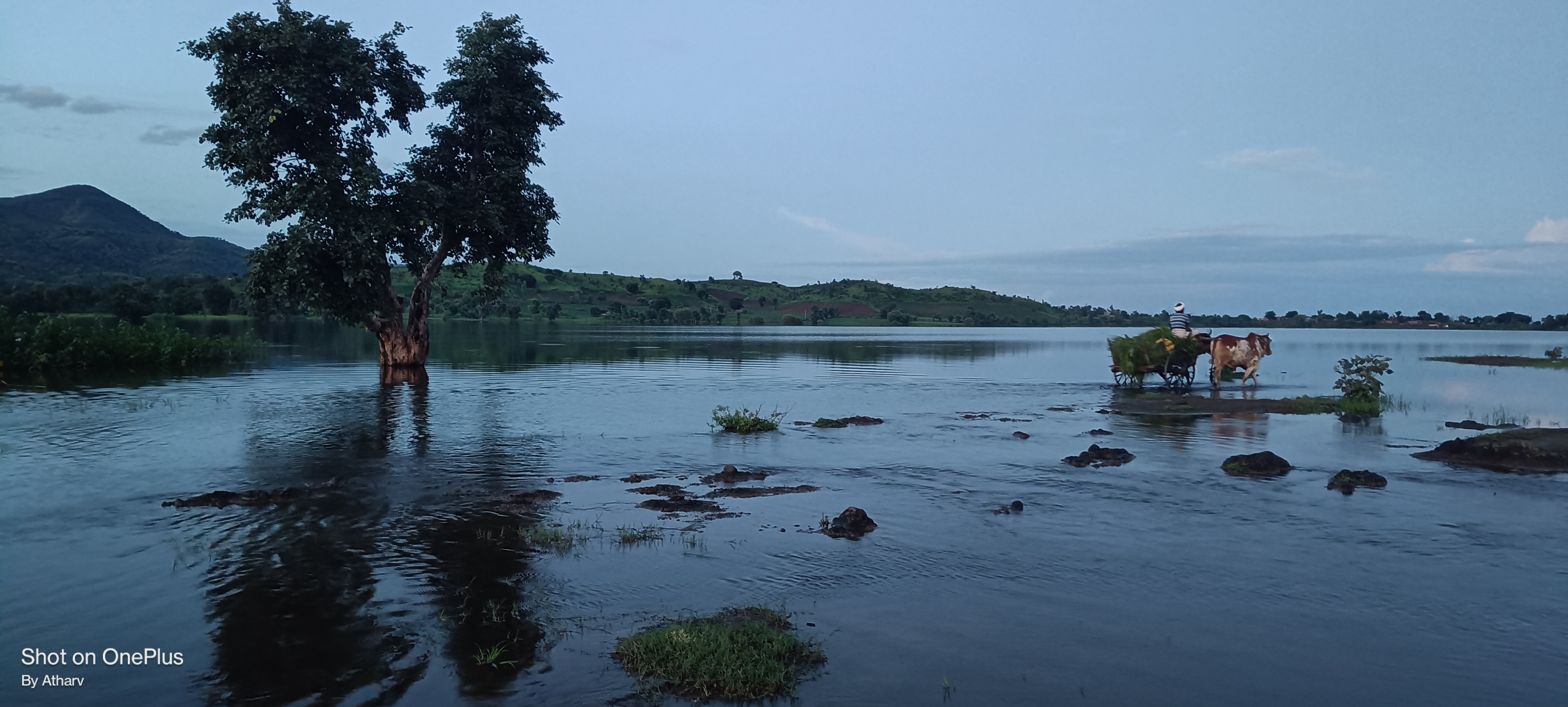
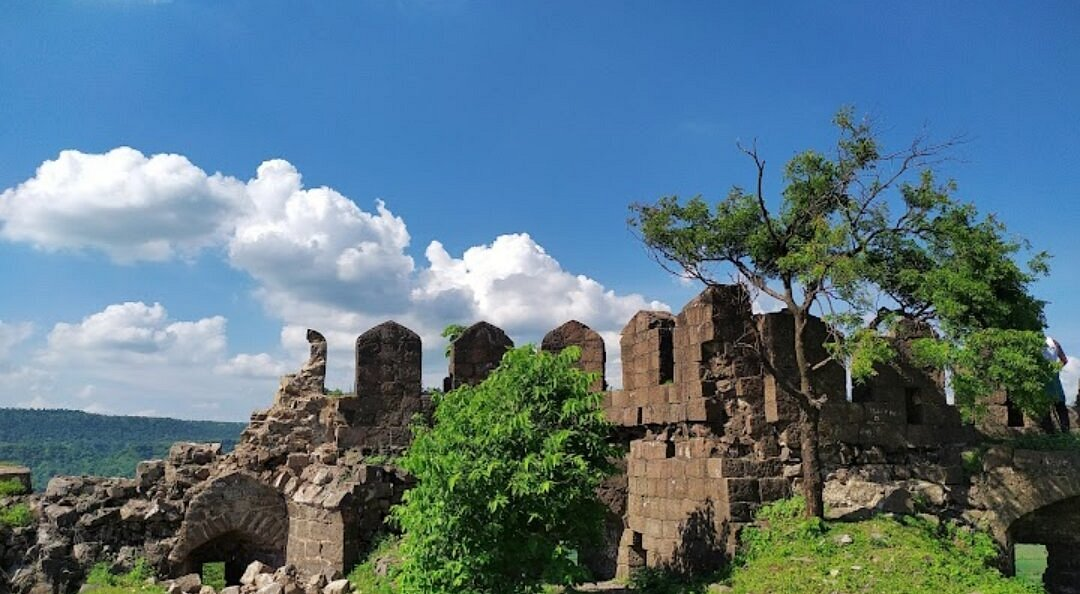
- Satpuda Ranges Sunset at Godada Dam, Satpuda Ranges Mailgad Fort

- Location in Maharashtra, India
- Coordinates: 21.0486°N 76.5344°E
- Country: India
- State: Maharashtra
- District: Buldhana

Area
  - City: 200 km^{2} (77 sq mi)
  - Urban: 200 km^{2} (77 sq mi)
  - Rural: 300 km^{2} (120 sq mi)
- Elevation: 291 m (955 ft)

Population (2011)
  - City: 128,275
  - Density: 640/km^{2} (1,700/sq mi)
  - Urban: 98,000

Languages
  - Official: Marathi
- Time zone: UTC+5:30 (IST)
- Postal codes: 443 402, 443 403
- Telephone code: 00-91-07266
- Vehicle registration: MH 28
- Lok Sabha constituency: Buldhana
- Vidhan Sabha constituency: Jalgaon Jamod

Jalgaon Jamod is a town in Buldhana district of Indian state of Maharashtra.

== History ==
The name Jalgaon is a combination of two Marathi words, Jal and Gaon, that mean village of water. This name came because of heavy water resources around the town. The name 'Jalgaon Jamod' developed because of a smaller village called 'Jamod' near to Jalgaon. Mughal emperors gave the name 'Jamod' after 1630 AD, when Mughal emperor Shahjahan's wife Mumtaz Mahal was traveling with Shah Jahan's earlier military campaigns. She started facing pregnancy complications in Jamod which led to death in the city of Burhanpur near Jalgaon Jamod. After this incident Mughals started calling the village Ja-e-Maut (Place of Death). Ja-e-Maut was a Persian word later called Ja-maut, Ja-mod or Jamod by locals.

As per Ain-e-Akbari, it was a Pargana town in the Sarkar (then district) of Narnala of Berar Subah. "Raja Bhartuhari", King of Bhoj Nagri(Bhopal) had samadhi at Jalgaon Jamod.

In August 1905, it was part of what was then Akola District and was transferred to Buldhana district along with Khamgaon tehsil. The municipality of Jalgaon was established in 1931.

== Geography ==
The town is situated at the base of the Satpura Range, about 10 km from Satpuda. Purna is the largest river in the tehsil which is also the largest in the district. Rajura and Gorada are famous natural dams in the Satpuda Ranges. They are enriched with the green beauty of Satpuda rows.

Borders:

- In the east is Sangrampur tehsil.
- In the west is Muktainagar Tehsil in Jalgaon Khandesh District.
- In the north is Burhanpur District, State of Madhya Pradesh.
- In the south is Nandura tehsil.

=== Satpuda Range ===
The Satpuda Range near Jalgaon Jamod in Maharashtra, India, contains several natural and religious sites. A route through the range includes three notable points locally known as the First Mori, Second Mori, and Third Mori. The Third Mori, also known as Aam-Paanee, is associated with two waterfalls and a rock formation locally referred to as the Satpudaa Wall.

The area also includes Godada Dam, which features a spillway locally known as Dudh Ganga.Other sites in and around the Satpuda Range include Amba Barwa, Mageri Mahadeo Cave, Jatashankar Waterfall, Umbardev(also known as Amarnaath), Jatashankar Waterfall, Badalkhora, Devdhree, Wari Hanumaan Temple, Hanuman Sagar Dam, Kakanwada(also known as Trymbak), Treeveni, and Mahilgad(also known as Mailgad).These locations are associated with natural features such as waterfalls, caves, forested areas, and river confluences, as well as religious sites and local traditions.

According to local descriptions, these destinations lie within approximately 40 kilometres of Jalgaon Jamod and collectively form part of the area's natural and cultural landscape. Exploring the various sites may take several days, depending on the route and the time spent at each location

== Demographics ==
Religion in Jalgaon Jamod City (2011)
1. Hinduism (76.6%)
2. Islam (15.1%)
3. Christianity (0.14%)
4. Sikhism (2.09%)
5. Buddhism (5.36%)
6. Jainism (0.63%)
7. Other religions (0.02%)
8. Atheist (0.06%)

== Transport ==
- National Highway 161H (India) From Nandura at terminating National Highway 161G (India)
- National Highway 161G (India) From Patur - Balapur – Shegaon – Sangrampur – Jalgaon Jamod – Khaknar of M.P.
- Khandvi – Muktainagar road going via Kurha. State Highway 195 connects Jalgaon Jamod
- MH SH 24 via Sangrampur – Telhara
- Nandura on Bhusawal – Badnera section of Bhusawal Division of Central Railway is a nearby railway station.
- Aurangabad Airport is a nearest domestic airport at distance 223 K.M. Dr. Babasaheb Ambedkar International Airport, Nagpur it is nearest international airport at distance 327 K.M.

== Literature ==
Jalgaon (Jamod) has a brilliant legacy of literature especially in Marathi Language. The Great Writer and Advocate Shri. Shripad Krushna Kolhatkar had started his law practice in Jalgaon (Jamod). Kolhatkar was a pioneer in the field of humour as well as literary criticism in Marathi. He is a writer of the famous Maharashtra Geet Bahu Asot Sundar Sampanna Ki Maha. He presided over Marathi Sahitya Sammelan held in Pune in 1913.

Later, Prof. Dinkar Vi. Joshi Alias Shri. Di. Vi. Joshi had continued kolhatkar's legacy of writing. He had played a prominent role in establishment of the 1st College in City named as "Shripad Krushna Kolhatkar Mahavidyalaya, Jalgaon (Jamod)". He had written and published over 100 Katha, 25 Laghukatha, 50 Poems, 40 Lalitbandhas through different magazines.

== Politics ==
- Sanjay Shriram Kute of BJP is the Member of Vidhan Sabha (4th Term). He is also district president for BJP.

== Places of interest ==
- Dhanora (Mahasiddha) :There is an ancient temple and Samadhi of Shri Mahasidham Maharaj in one of the 84 SIDDHA in Dhanora Nagari, which is situated in the holy city of Satpura, situated about 06 km away from Jalgaon Jamod. This eight-day fair is the second largest in Buldhana district.
