= Kolad =

Village in Maharashtra

- Country: India
- State: Maharashtra
- District: Raigad
- Taluka: Roha

Population (2001)
  - Total: 12,116
- Postal codes: 402304; 402109

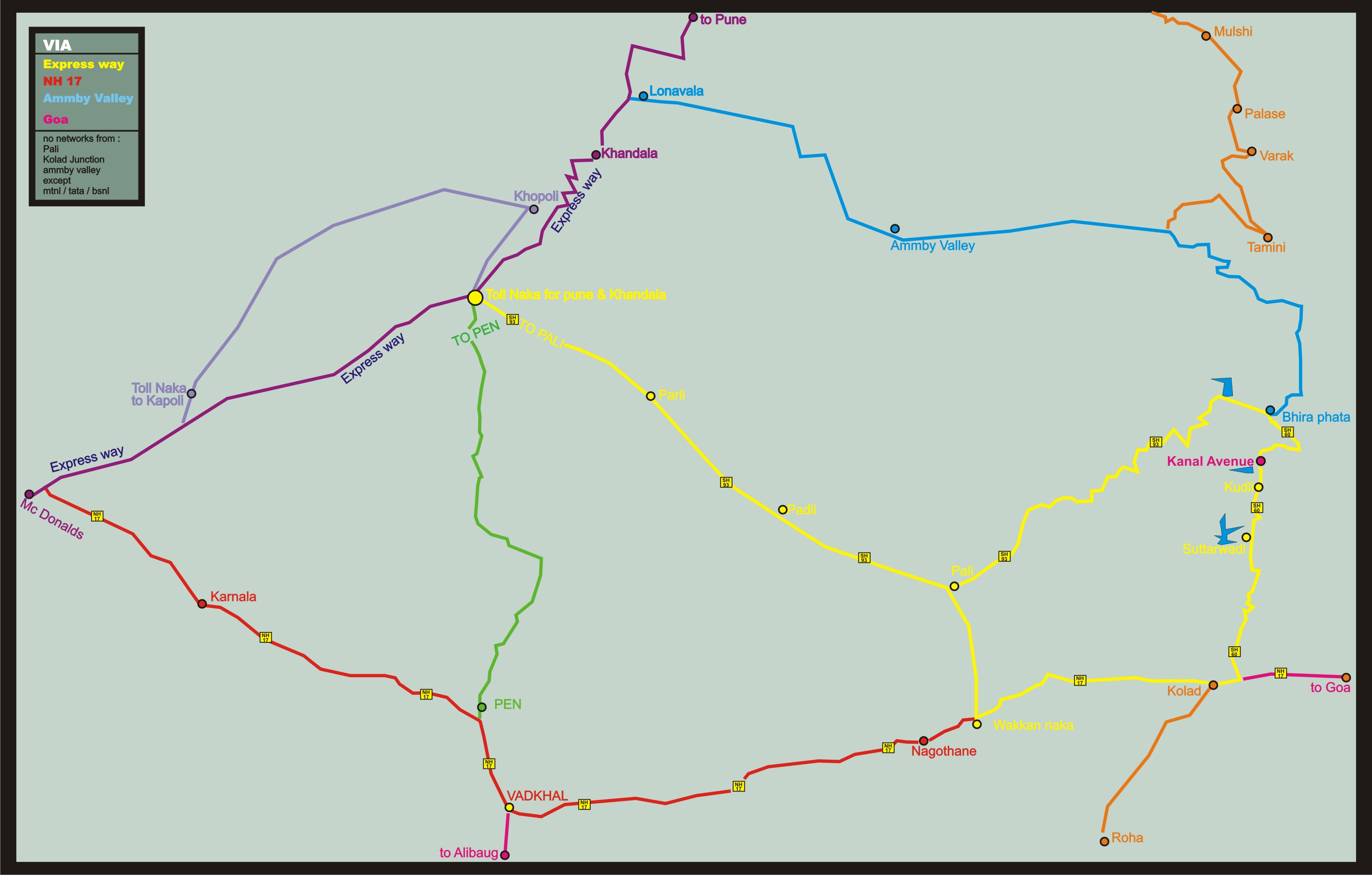
Road map to Kolad

Kolad is a village in Raigad district, Maharashtra State, India. It is 117 km from Mumbai on the National Highway no 66 (Mumbai-Goa). It is connected to Pune via the Kolad Pune- Kolad state highway. It lies on the banks of the River Kundalika. The village post office Postal Index Number (PIN code) is 402304 & 402109.

== Weather ==
Kolad has a varied climate; spring (March to May) is hot and sultry, while the monsoon season (June to September) is accompanied by heavy rainfalls. Winter is during November to February and is characterized by a medium level of humidity and cool weather.

== Demographics ==
At the 2001 India census, Kolad had a population of 12,116.

== Geography ==
Nearby villages include dagadwadi, Gove, Pugaon, Pui, Pahur, Suttarwadi, Kudali, Ambewadi, Kamat, Jamgaon, Durtoli, Bhira, Ville, Tise, Bhuvan, Talavali and Yeral.

Nearby towns are Roha, Indapur, Mangaon and Nagothane.

== Transport ==
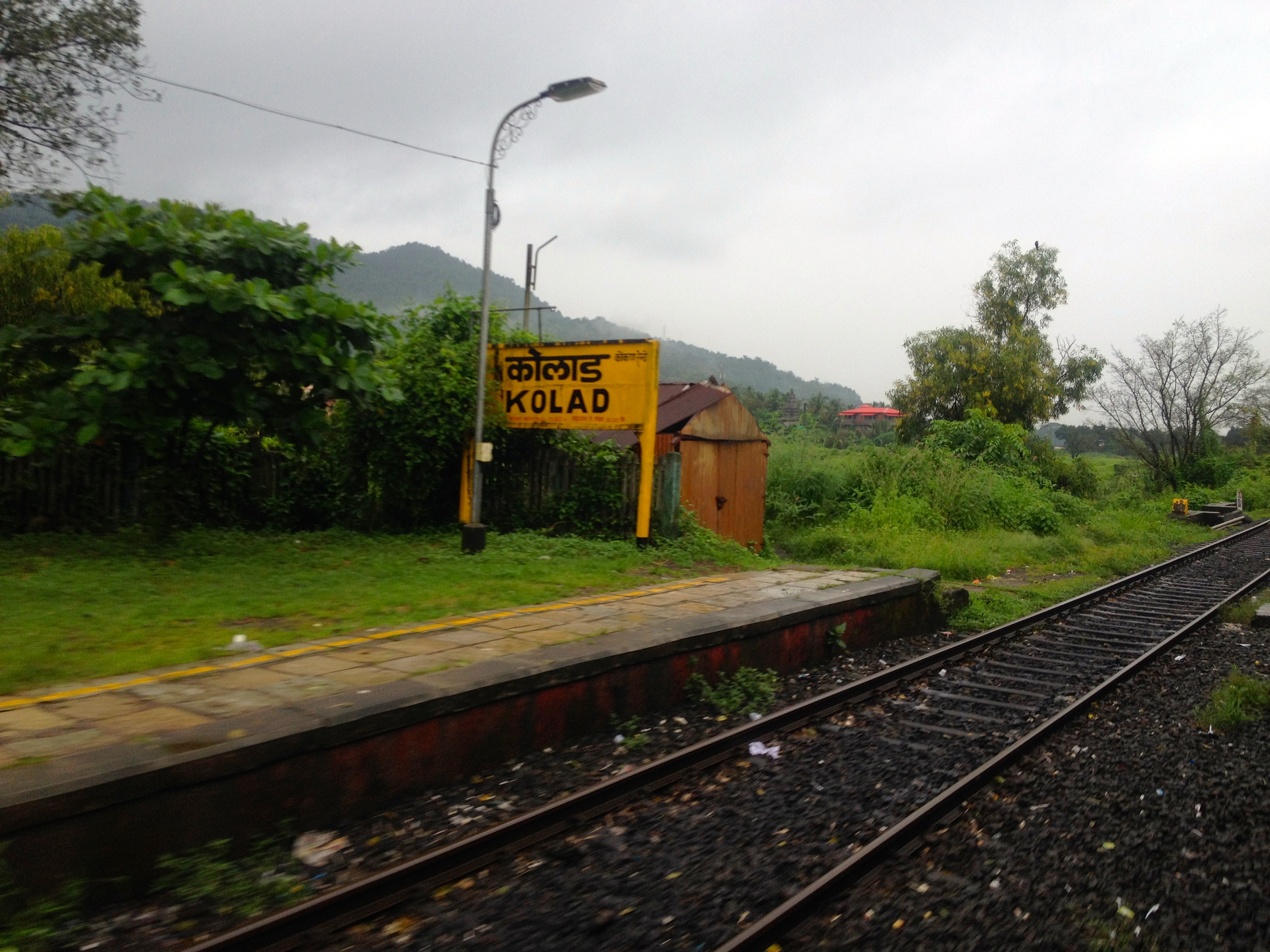
Kolad Railway Station

Kolad is located on NH 17, popularly known as the Mumbai - Goa highway. Kolad can also be accessed from the Mumbai Pune Expressway, via the Khopoli exit, and State Highway 60. The Maharashtra State Road Transport Corporation (MSRTC) operates regular bus services to Roha. Mangaon. Auto rickshaws also ply the route.

=== Kolad Railway Station ===
Kolad railway station is the first station on the Konkan Railway line. Express and mail trains connect Kolad to Mumbai in approximately three hours. Kolad is the starting point for the roll-on/roll-off (RORO) service of the Konkan Railway, a road-rail synergy system, where loaded trucks are directly carried by railway wagons and delivered to their destination by rail. This service was introduced in January 1999.

== Infrastructure ==
Most of the infrastructure in Kolad is maintained by Gram Panchayat, which includes paving the roads, provision of water supply and other essential services like garbage disposal and beautification.

Electricity is provided by the state-run Maharashtra State Electricity Board (MSEB). Telecom services are managed by the state-run BSNL telecom and other private companies. Broadband is provided by BSNL. BSNL & TATA are the only service providers with a complete network.

== River rafting at Kolad ==
White water river rafting is a popular adventure water sport for people from Mumbai and Pune. The Kundalika River in Kolad is the best option for white water rafting in Maharashtra. The huge amount of water released from a local dam each morning creates good opportunities for rafting. The Maharashtra government promotes river rafting through its official tourism website.
