= Telhara =

- town
- Location in Maharashtra, India
- Coordinates: 21.03°N 76.84°E
- Country: India
- State: Maharashtra
- District: Akola
- Established: 1800s

Government
  - Type: Telhara Municipal Council
  - Body: BJP

Area
  - Total: 21.12 km^{2} (8.15 sq mi)
  - Rank: 5th in District
- Elevation: 274 m (899 ft)

Population (2011)
  - Total: 21,259
  - Density: 1,007/km^{2} (2,607/sq mi)

Language
  - Official: Marathi
- Time zone: UTC+5:30 (IST)
- Postal code: 444108
- Vehicle registration: MH30

Telhara is a town and a municipal council in Akola district in the Indian state of Maharashtra. Telhara is called the Cotton City; it is one of the largest cotton-producing subdistrict in Vidarbha Region. It is located 54 km towards North from District headquarters Akola. It is a Taluka headquarter.

Telhara is surrounded by Sangrampur Taluka towards west, Akot Taluka towards East, Shegaon Taluka towards South, Jalgaon jamod Taluka towards west .

Akola, Amravati, Khamgaon, Akot are the nearby cities to Telhara. The town is also known for the vibrant Varhadi language.

== History ==
Telhara is a Taluka place in Akola district of Maharashtra. It is situated near the Satpuda parvat.

The Battle of Adgaon Bk village is located in Telhara subdistrict, took place on 28 November 1803, between the British under the command of Governor Arthur Wellesley and the Maratha forces under the Bhonsle of Nagpur during Second Anglo-Maratha War.

When Jalgaon taluk belonged to Akola District an Extra-Assistant Commissioner was stationed at Telhara and had civil jurisdiction over Akot and Jalgaon taluks. This has now been discontinued, but during 1908 a Bench of Honorary Magistrates was established at Telhara with jurisdiction was over one-fourth of Akot taluk. For revenue purposes there are five separate villages adjoining one another.

== Architectural features ==
Wan dam is located on wan river at the site of Wari village in Telhara Taluka of Akola District in Maharashtra, India. This is one of the largest irrigation projects in the Indian state of Maharashtra. The water is mainly used to irrigate agricultural land in the western vidarbha. It also provides water for drinking to nearby towns, villages and Cities like Akola, Telhara Shegaon. The surrounding area of the dam has a garden old Hanumana temple.

The place has no ancient temples of much interest, but does have several temples of some size built during the 20th century or later. Harakhchand Gulabchand Shah, Honorary Magistrate, a Swetambari Jain, built a temple to Padmaprabhu in 1901 to carry out a vow of his father's, at a cost of Rs. 40,000 or more. It has a golden image, and the building is strikingly coloured and furnished; with details such as the introduction of the figures of British soldiers in the front.

== Markets ==
The neighbourhood is rich in markets the main one being the one at Malegaon, 3 miles away. One is held at Telhara on Sundays. During the rest of the week, but not on bazaar day, the same site is used as a cotton-market. The demand is that of four gins and two presses in the town, but this is sufficient to absorb all the cotton of the locality and to bring perhaps 200 or 250 carts a day into Telhara. A police station and a hospital have been situated here for many years, and there is also a telegraph-office; the schools are vernacular only. A library survives from the time of the important courts now removed. The size of the town causes difficulties about its sanitation, and its commercial activity is somewhat hampered in the rains by the lack of good roads, as the road from Telhara to Adsul is not kept in good condition. The town used to celebrate all festivals.

== Education ==
There are several Institutes for education in telhara-

- Seth Bansidhar High School and Junior College.
- Shree Shivaji High School.
- Dr. Gopalrao Khedkar Mahavidyalaya (Gadegaon) Telhara.
- Late. Narmadabai Bodkhe D.T.ed College Telhara.
- Gurukul School & Junior College Telhara.
- Government Industrial Training Institute (I.T.I) Telhara.
- Swami vivekanand Dhyanpeeth Convent School, Telhara.
- Yashogatha Public School
- Bramha kumari Vidyalay
- Kannay School Telhara
- Santa Gadgebaba school
- Urdu High School Telhara
- R.T.M. DNYANPEETH NP SCHOOL
- S.S.G.M. DNYANPEETH NP SCHOOL
- LATE BHAUSAHEB RAJANKAR VIDYAL School
- NAVYUG VIDYALAYA School
- SY QAMRODDIN SY ISMAIL URDU HIGH TELHARA School
- SANSKAR CONVENT TELHARA School
- Several Government high schools.

Another is the newly founded Jaganath Dhone Jr. College, Talegaon.

== Meditation center ==
"Dhamma Anakula Vipassana center" is located in Khaperkhed Telhara. Which is 5 km from Telhara on Telhara- Shegaon Road. Local Taxi and Bus are available in every 15 minutes from Telhara. Regular residential 10-day courses and 2, 3-day Bal anapana shibir are also held here, 10-day course is open for anyone above 20 years of age.

Hundred and thousands of peoples are comes here every year from all over the Maharashtra.

== Geography ==
Telhara has extreme climate conditions all year around. The town suffers from very low temperature in winter (may go up to 3 – 5 degrees), a heavy rains and very high temperatures during the summer (temperature in month of May may rise up to 48 degrees). It is situated near by "Gautama" river. Telhara has an average elevation of 274 metres (898 feet).

== Demographics ==
Telhara is a Municipal Council city in district of Akola, Maharashtra. The Telhara city is divided into 17 wards for which elections are held every 5 years. The Telhara Municipal Council has estimated population of 30500 as per report released by Municipal Council of Telhara.

Population of Children with age of 0–6 is 2352 which is 11.21% of total population of Telhara (M Cl). In Telhara Municipal Council, the female sex ratio is 951 against state average of 929. Moreover, the child sex ratio in Telhara is around 852 compared to Maharashtra state average of 894. The literacy rate of Telhara city is 90.18% higher than the state average of 82.34%. In Telhara, male literacy is around 94.04% while the female literacy rate is 86.19%.

Telhara Municipal Council has total administration over 4,518 houses to which it supplies basic amenities like water and sewerage. It is also authorize to build roads within Municipal Council limits and impose taxes on properties coming under its jurisdiction.

=== Telhara Religion Data ===
Year	Male	Female	Total Population	Change	Religion (%)							
Year	Male	Female	Total Population	Change	Hindu	Muslim	Christian	Sikhs	Buddhist	Jain	Other religions and persuasions	Religion not stated
2001	9773	9133	18906	-	78.245	9.976	0.090	0.016	11.282	0.286	0.074	0.032
2011	10759	10227	20986	0.110	77.585	10.393	0.114	0.048	11.574	0.233	0.000	0.052
