= Shegaon =

Shegaon Santnagri Shegaon
- City
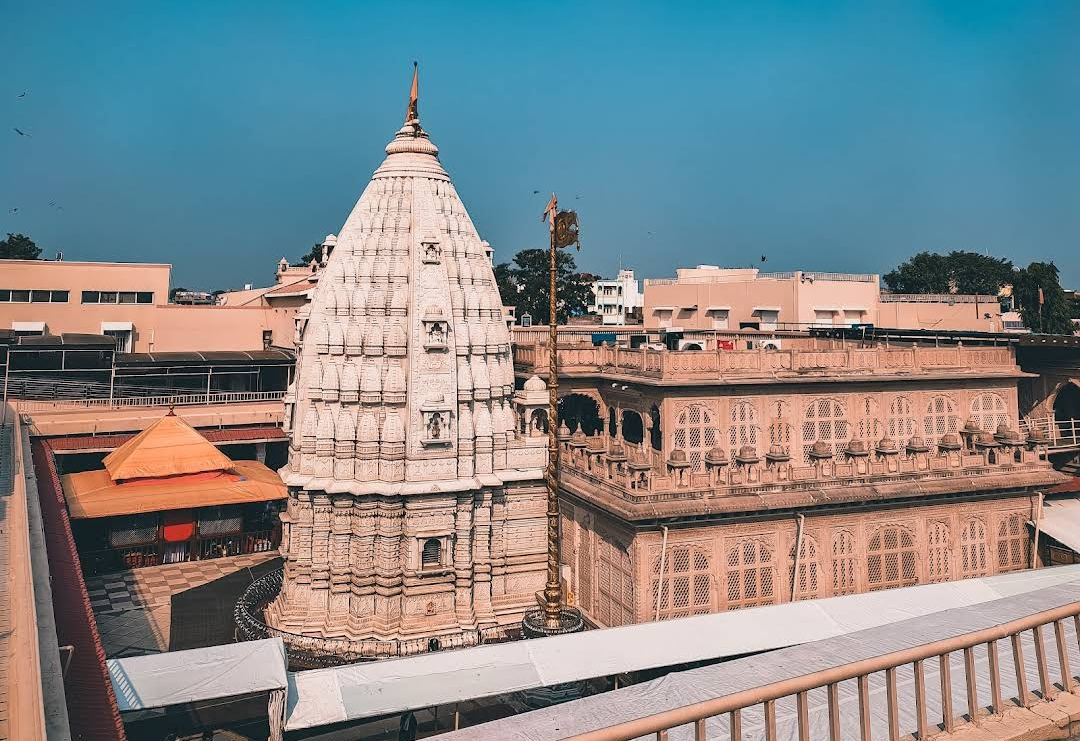
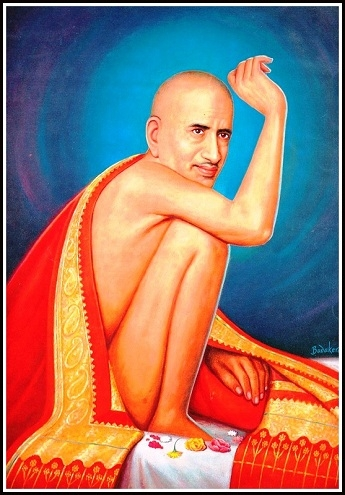
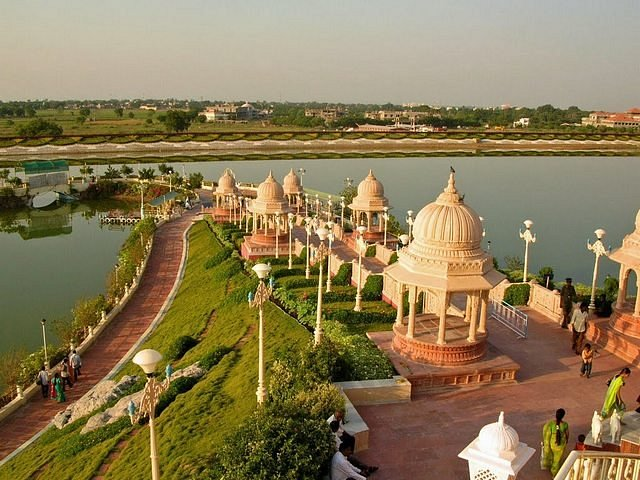
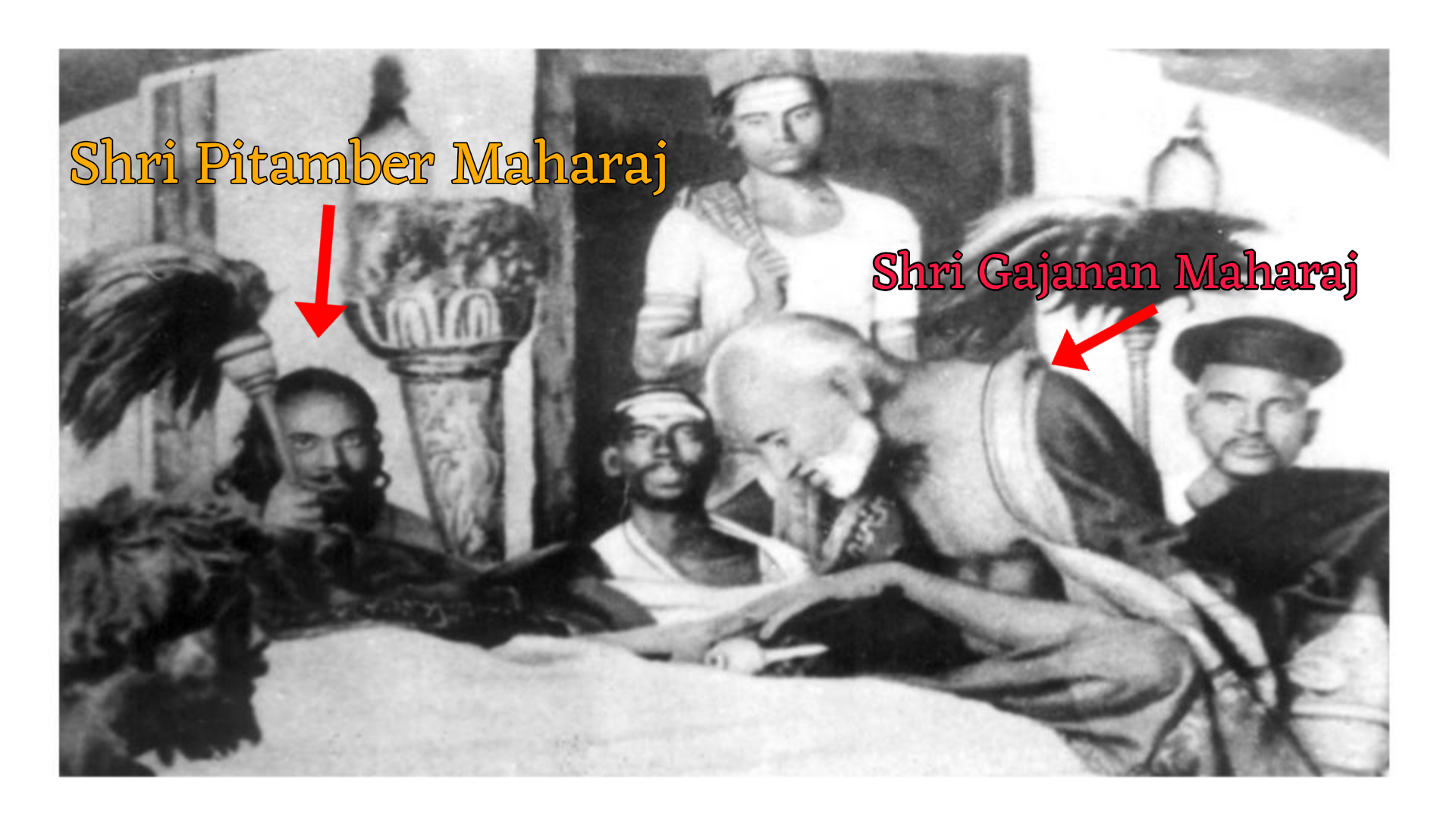
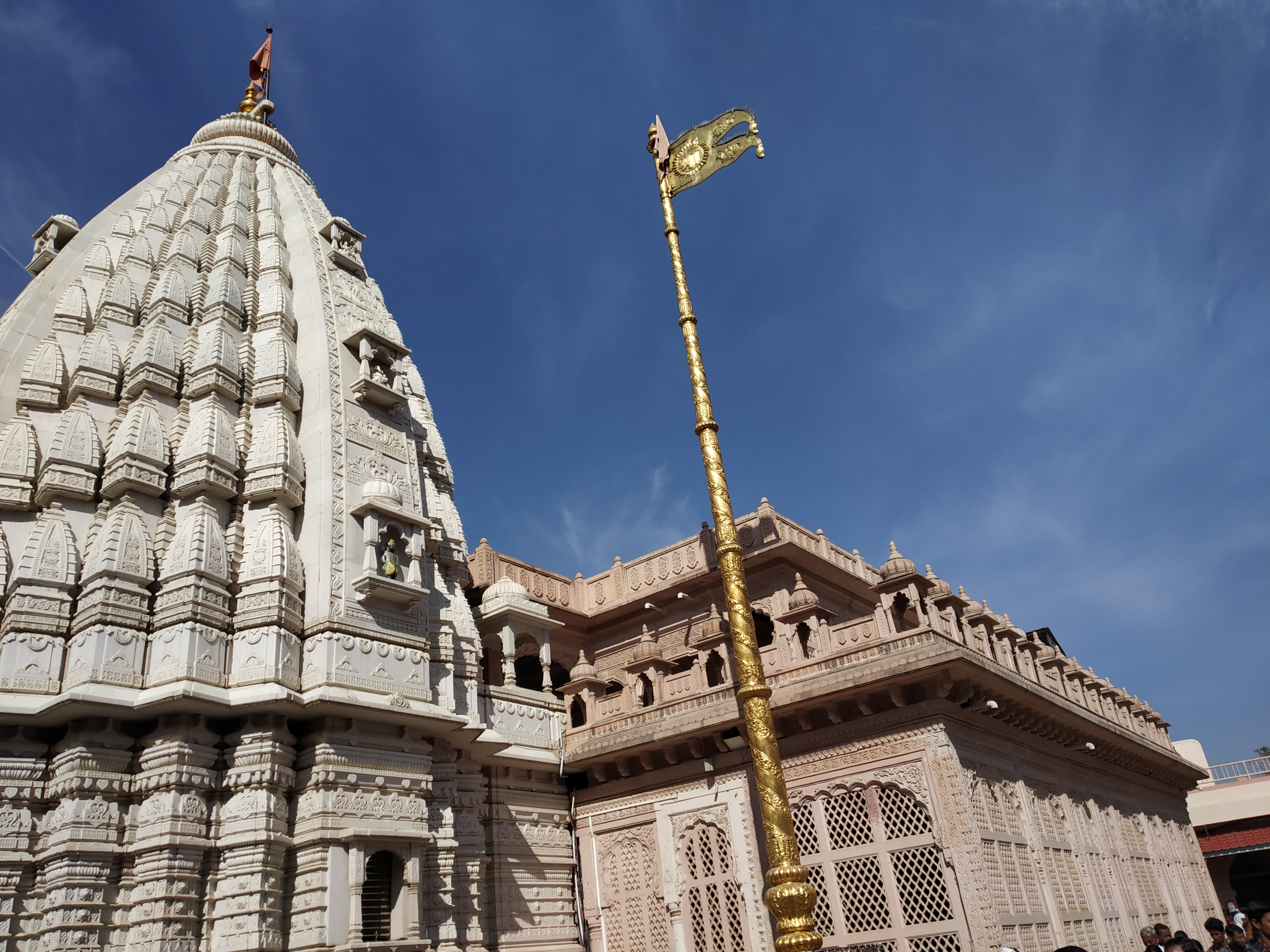
- Nickname: Pandharpur of Vidarbha
- Location within Maharashtra
- Coordinates: 20°47′40″N 76°41′40″E
- Country: India
- State: Maharashtra
- District: Buldhana

Government
  - Type: Municipal Council
  - Body: Mayor-Council
- Elevation: 275 m (902 ft)

Population (2021)
  - Total: 256,466

Languages
  - Official: Marathi
- Time zone: UTC+5:30 (IST)
- PIN: 444203
- Telephone code: 00-91-7265
- Vehicle registration: MH-28, MH-56

Shegaon is a city and municipal council in the Buldhana district in the Indian state of Maharashtra. Shegaon has become a pilgrimage centre due to the influence of Shri Sant Gajanan Maharaj, who is a Hindu saint.

== Demographics ==
Religions in Shegaon
Religion	Percent
Hindus	66%
Muslims	20%
Buddhists	8.6%
Christians	1.4%
Jains	3.7%
Others†	0.3%
Distribution of religions †Includes Sikhs (0.2%), Buddhists (<0.2%).

As of 2001 India census, Shegaon had a population of 52,418. Men constitute 52% of the population and women, 48%. Shegaon has an average literacy rate of 73%, which is higher than the national average of 59.5%: male literacy is 78%, and female literacy is 66%. In Shegaon, 14% of the population is under 6 years of age.

== Transportation ==
Shegaon is located 300 km (190 mi) west of Nagpur and 550 km (340 mi) east of Mumbai. It is connected by Hajira–Dhule–Howrah National Highway 6 to Khamgaon, Nandura, Balapur, Malkapur and Akola.

Shegaon Railway Station is located on the Howrah–Nagpur–Mumbai line of the Central Railway of Indian Railways. It has direct train connectivity to Chhatrapati Shivaji Terminus, Lokmanya Tilak Terminus Mumbai, Delhi, Chennai, Secunderabad, Pune, Akola, Tatanagar, Ahmedabad, Okha, Kolhapur, Amravati, Wardha, Nanded, Nagpur, Gondia, Bilaspur, Howrah, Shalimar, Chandrapur.Several Mumbai trains stop at Shegaon, including the Vande Bharat Express, Gitanjali Express, Vidarbha Superfast Express, Amravati Superfast Express, Howrah–Mumbai CSMT Mail, Sewagram Express, Pune–Nagpur Express, Navjeevan Express, Gondwana Express, Maharashtra Express, Puri–Okha Dwarka Express, and Shalimar–Lokmanya Tilak Terminus Express.

== Education ==
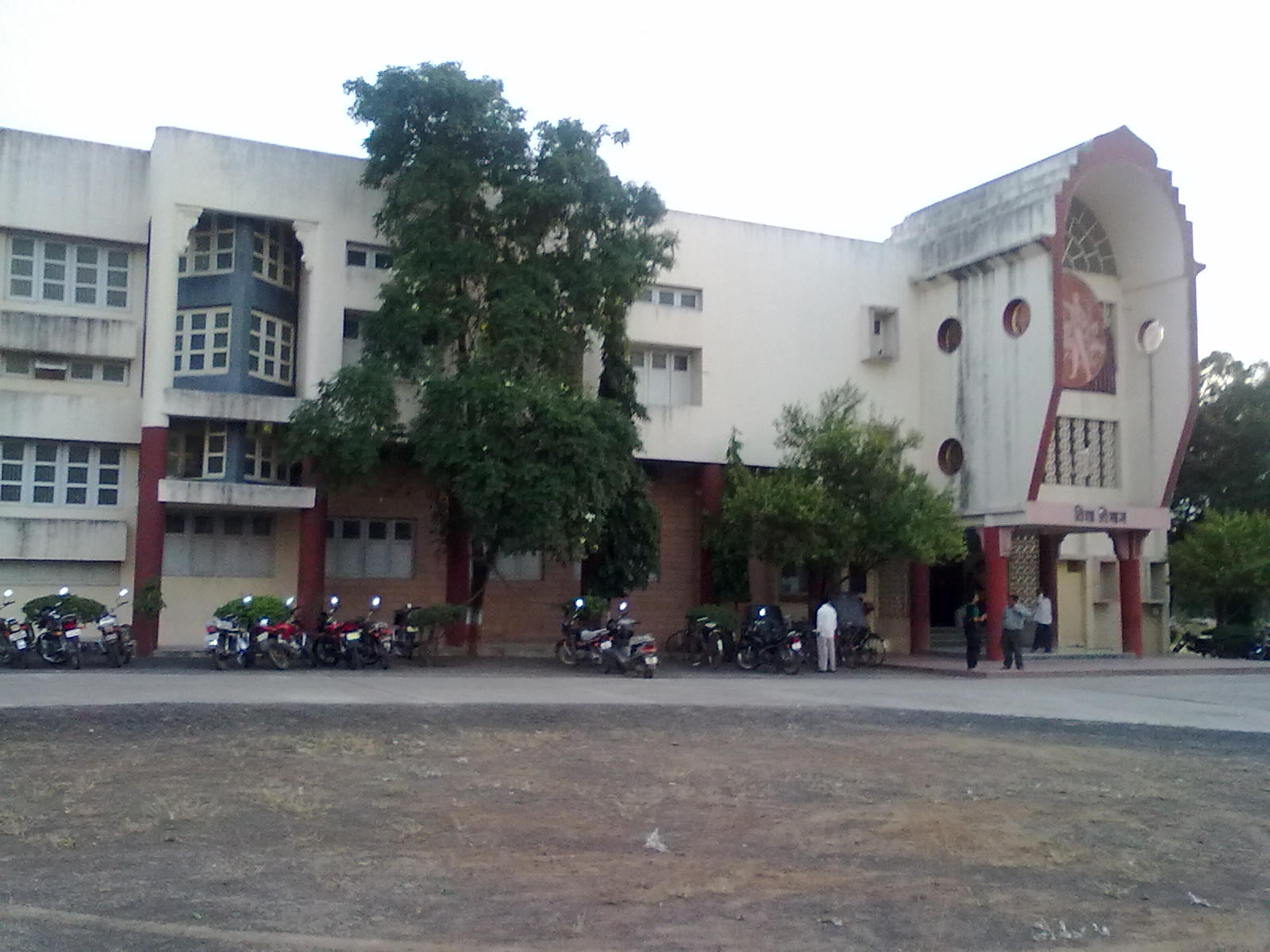
Shri Sant Gajanan Maharaj College of Engineering, main building

All colleges in Shegaon are affiliated with Sant Gadge Baba Amravati University. These include, but are not limited to, the Industrial Training Institute and the Shri Sant Gajanan Maharaj College of Engineering (SSGMCE), Mauli College of Engineering and Technology.

Jawahar Navodaya Vidyalaya (Chincholi) Shegaon school is situated on the Shegaon-Khamgaon road.

== Industry ==
Shegaon has traditionally had a large cotton market, with the product from ginning and pressing mills of Shegaon transported to textile mills in Mumbai via goods trains. British textile companies had their procurement office in Shegaon during pre-independence days. Many ginning and pressing mills operate in this area.

Shegaon also has engineering industries that manufacture material-handling equipment like chain pulley blocks, industrial cranes, and link chains. Shegaon has a mineral water bottling plant, oil mills, paint manufacturing, and other industries.

== Demographics ==
As per the Indian census of 2011, the population of Shegaon was 59,672.

Year	Male	Female	Total Population	Change	Religion (%)							
Year	Male	Female	Total Population	Change	Hindu	Muslim	Christian	Sikhs	Buddhist	Jain	Other religions and persuasions	Religion not stated
2001	27076	25347	52423	-	66.379	22.181	0.090	0.019	10.806	0.515	0.000	0.010
2011	30547	29125	59672	0.138	64.451	23.376	0.112	0.047	11.500	0.434	0.027	0.054

View source data.
View source data.

== Climate ==
Climate data for Shegaon
Month	Jan	Feb	Mar	Apr	May	Jun	Jul	Aug	Sep	Oct	Nov	Dec	Year
Mean daily maximum °C (°F)	30 (86)	32.8 (91.0)	37 (99)	40.4 (104.7)	42 (108)	37.3 (99.1)	31.5 (88.7)	30.3 (86.5)	31.3 (88.3)	33.2 (91.8)	31.2 (88.2)	29.8 (85.6)	33.9 (93.1)
Daily mean °C (°F)	22.1 (71.8)	24.4 (75.9)	28.7 (83.7)	32.8 (91.0)	35 (95)	31.7 (89.1)	27.7 (81.9)	26.8 (80.2)	27.2 (81.0)	26.9 (80.4)	23.5 (74.3)	21.6 (70.9)	27.4 (81.3)
Mean daily minimum °C (°F)	14.3 (57.7)	16.1 (61.0)	20.4 (68.7)	25.2 (77.4)	28.1 (82.6)	26.1 (79.0)	24 (75)	23.4 (74.1)	23.2 (73.8)	20.6 (69.1)	15.9 (60.6)	13.9 (57.0)	20.9 (69.7)
Average precipitation mm (inches)	4 (0.2)	3 (0.1)	8 (0.3)	5 (0.2)	11 (0.4)	105 (4.1)	171 (6.7)	148 (5.8)	143 (5.6)	41 (1.6)	7 (0.3)	8 (0.3)	654 (25.7)

More than 86% of the average annual rainfall comes in the monsoon season from June to September.

== Landmarks ==
=== Shri Sant Gajanan Maharaj Temple ===
Shri Sant Gajanan Maharaj Temple is named for Gajanan Maharaj, who once lived there. Hindus consider Gajanan Maharaj a saint with miraculous powers, and the temple is built at his place of samādhi (meditation). It is the largest temple trust in the Vidarbha region and is known as the "Pandharpur of Vidarbha". It attracts pilgrims from across Maharashtra.

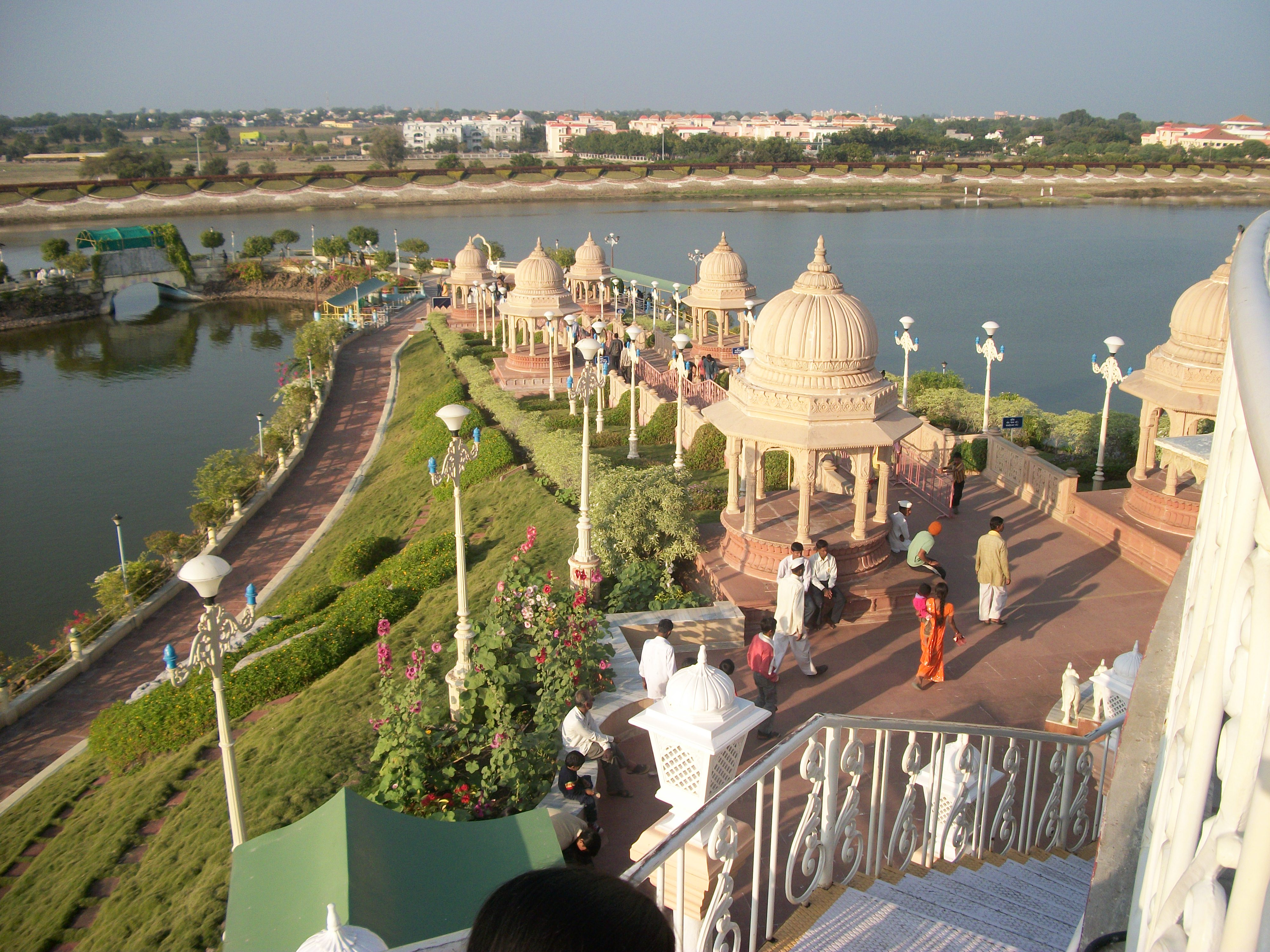
A scene from Anand Sagar, Shegaon

=== Anand Sagar ===
Shegaon has a tourist attraction called "Anand Sagar". The project's budget is ₹300 crore (3 billion rupees). Anand Sagar was developed in 2005 by Shri Gajanan Maharaj Mandir Trust on about 140 hectares (350 acres) of land. It is a spiritual and entertainment centre for pilgrims, built around a Dhyana Mandir. There is a 9–11-metre-high (30–35 ft) statue of Swami Vivekananda above a meditation cell at the centre of the water reservoir. It is a replica of Vivekananda Kendra at Kanyakumari. There is an Amphitheatre which seats 3,500 people, used to organise cultural activities, functions, and exhibitions. The water reservoir being developed is anticipated to meet existing and proposed needs of the Sansthan.

== Shegaon Tehsil ==
Shegaon Tehsil is part of the Buldhana district. It consists of 436 square kilometres (168 sq mi), 95 villages, and a population of around 125,000 people.

Some of the villages are: Janori, Kalkhed, Jalamb, Pahurjira, Bhota, Sagoda, Bhongaon, Dadgaon, Matargaon, Mongaon Digras, Taroda Tarodi, Pahurpurna, Manasgaon, Adsul, Zadegaon, Palodi, Shrikshetra Nagzari, Chincholi Karfarma, Gaigaon, Jawala Palaskhed, Wankhed, Jawala, Alasana, Kherda, Gaulkhed, Takali Viro, Lasura, Warkhed, Amboda, Machchhindrakhed, Lanjud, Pimpri Deshmukh, Tintrav, Gavhan, and Taroda Kasaba.
