= Bhusawal railway division =

Railway division of India

Bhusawal railway division is one of the five railway divisions under the jurisdiction of Central Railway zone of the Indian Railways. It has its headquarters located at Bhusawal in Jalgaon district of the Indian state of Maharashtra. The other railway divisions are: Mumbai CSMT, Nagpur, Solapur and Pune. There are 115 railway stations in the Bhusawal railway division.

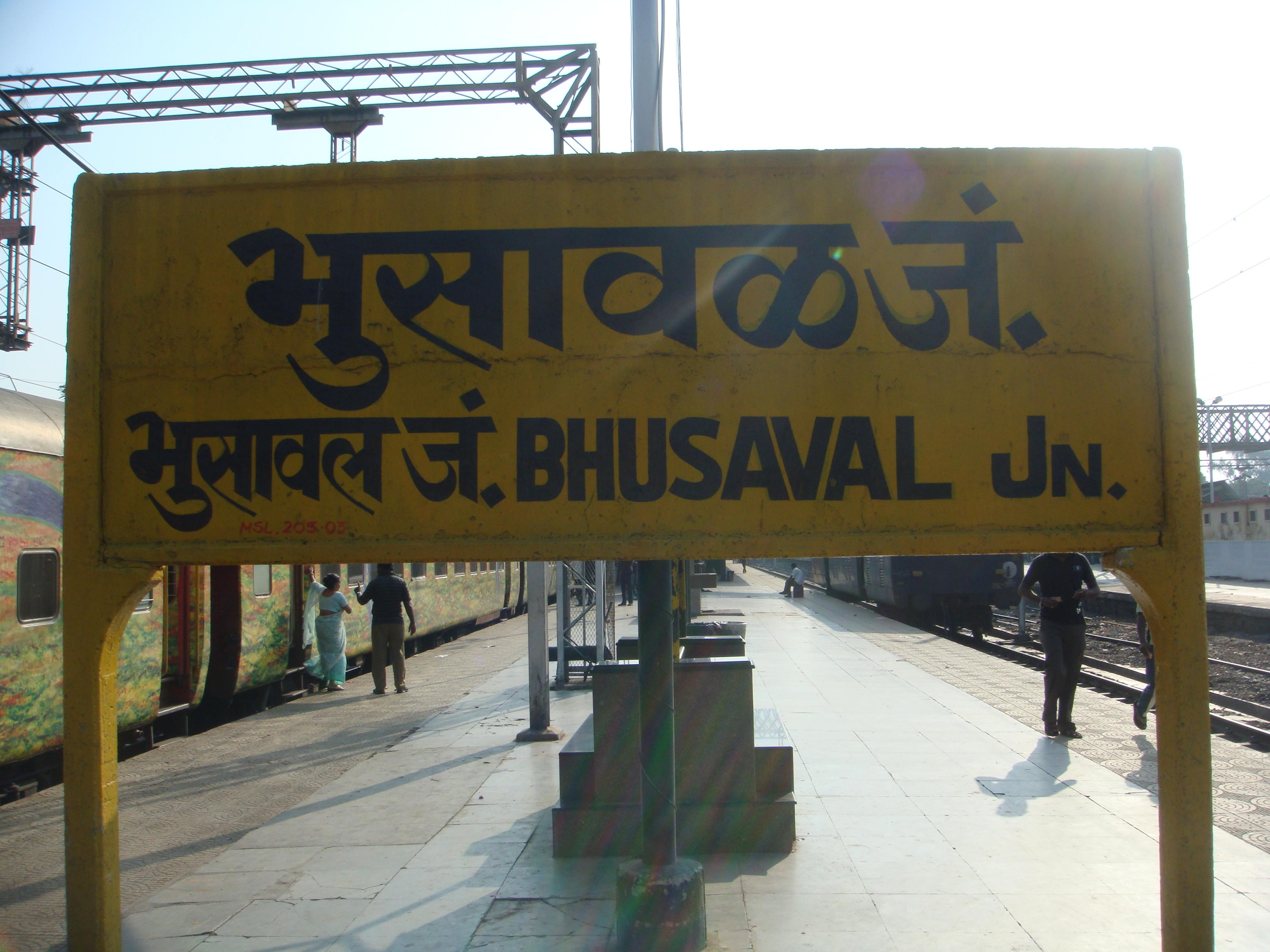
Bhusawal Junction

== History ==
Milestones In 1853, the Survey for extension of Mumbai-Thane line beyond Igatpuri towards Khandesh was completed. By 1860, the Bhusawal Station building with a single platform was constructed. The following year, the Igatpuri – Bhusawal section was opened on October 1. By 1866, the Bhusawal – Khandwa Section was opened and in 1867, the Bhusawal – Badnera section became active as single line.

In 1920, the Bhusawal division was formed under the Great Indian Peninsula Railway (GIPR) and within the next two years, the doubling of the Bhusawal - Badnera section was completed.

Eventually, Bhusawal become part of the Central Railway Zone in 1951 and in 1962, the Central Railway Zonal Training School setup at Bhusawal. Electrification with 25 KV AC Traction was completed for the Igatpuri – Bhusawal section in 1969 and by 1972, Bhusawal Electric Loco shed started functioning. The Bhusawal-Badnera Section was electrified with 25 kV AC traction in 1990 and the Bhusawal Khandwa Section was electrified in 1992. As a result, by 1993, the Bhusawal steam loco shed was shut down and the last steam loco was withdrawn from service on 16 December 1993.

== Connections ==
It connects other railway division of central railway zone at

- Mumbai CSMT Railway Division at Igatpuri,
- Solapur Railway Division at Manmad Jn,
- Nagpur Railway Division at Badnera Junction.

It connects to other Zones of Indian railways at

- Mamnad Jn to Nanded Railway Division of South Central Railway zone
- Jalgaon Jn to Mumbai(WR) railway division of Western Railway zone
- Khandwa Jn. to Bhopal Junction railway division of Western Central Railway Zone
- Khandwa Jn to Ratlam Division of Western Railway zone
- Khandwa Jn to Nanded Railway Division of South Central Railway zone
- Akola Jn to Nanded Railway Division of South Central Railway zone

== List of railway stations and towns ==
The list includes the stations under the Bhusawal division and their station category.

Category of station	No. of stations	Names of stations
A-1 Category	1	Nasik Road
A Category	10	Akola Junction, Amravati, Badnera Junction, Bhusaval Junction, Burhanpur, Chalisgaon Junction, Jalgaon, Khandwa Junction, Shegaon, Khamgaon, Manmad
B Category	4	Malkapur, Devlali, Pachora Junction, Murtajapur Junction
C Category (Suburban station)	0	-
D Category	7	-
E Category	55	-
F Category; Halt Station	38	-
Total	115	-

=== Junction stations ===
The Junction railway stations in the Bhusawal railway divisions are: Chalisgaon Jn, Pachora Jn, Jalgaon Jn, Bhusawal Jn, Manmad jn, Khandwa Jn, Jalamb Jn, Akola Jn, Murtajapur Jn, Badnera Jn.

== Railway line and en route stations ==
There are three main lines in this railway subdivision and numerous branch lines.

The railway line en route station details are as follows:

=== Igatpuri-Bhusawal line ===
- Igatpuri(Exclude)-Manmad Jn-Chalisgaon Jn-Pachora Jn-Jalgaon Jn-Bhusawal Jn
- En route station details- Igatpuri - Ghoti - Padli - Asvali - Lahavit - Devlali - Nashik Road - Odha - Kherwadi - Kasbe Sukene - Niphad - Ugaon - Lasalgaon - Summit - Manmad Jn - Panewadi - Hisvahal - Panjhan - Nandgaon - Pimparkhed - Naydongari - Rohini - Hirapur - Chalisgaon Jn - Vaghali - Kajgaon - Nagardevla - Galan - Pachora Jn - Pardhade - Maheji - Mhasawad - Shirsoli - Jalgaon Jn - Bhadli - Bhusawal Jn
  - Chalisgaon Jn- Dhule
  - En route station details- Chalisgaon Jn - Bhoras Budruk - Jamdha - Rajmane - Mordad Tanda - Shirud - Borvihar - Mohade P Laling - Dhule
  - Pachora Jn- Jamner (Narrow Gauge)
  - En route station details- Pachora Jn - Varkhedi - Pimpalgaon - Shendurni - Pahur - Bhagdara - Jamner

Section	Main/Branch	Gauge	Double/Single line	Traction	Distance in km
Igatpuri (excl.) to Manmad Jn	Main	BG	Double	Electric	124
Manmad Jn to Chalisgaon Jn	Main	BG	Double	Electric	67
Chalisgaon Jn to Dhule	Branch	BG	Single	Diesel	57
Chalisgaon Jn to Pachora Jn	Main	BG	Double	Electric	45
Pachora Jn to Jamner	Branch	NG	Single	Diesel	50
Pachora Jn to Jalgaon Jn	Main	BG	Double	Electric	47
Jalgaon Jn to Bhusawal Jn	Main	BG	Double	Electric	25
Total	-- km of Main	-- km of BG	-- km of double line	-- km of electrified track	---
	-- km of Branch	-- km of NG	-- km of single line	-- km of diesel track	---

=== Bhusawal-Khandwa line ===
- Bhusawal Jn-Burhanpur-Khandwa Jn(Include)
- En route station details- Bhusawal Jn - Duskheda - Savda - Nimbhora - Raver - Wghoda. - Burhanpur - Asirgarh Road - Chandni - Nepa Nagar - Mandwa - Sagphata - Dongargaon - Kohdad - Bagmar - Badegaon Gujar - Khandwa Jn

=== Bhusawal-Badnera line ===
- Bhusawal Jn-Jalamb Jn-Akola Jn-Murtajapur Jn-Badnera Junction (Include)
  - En route station details- Bhusawal Jn - Varangaon - Achegaon - Bodwad - Kolhadi. - Khamkhed - Malkapur - Wadoda - Biswa Bridge - Kumgaon Burti - Nandura - Jalamb Jn - Shegaon - Shrikshetra Nagzari - Paras - Gaigaon - Akola Jn - Yavatmal- Ladkhed - Borgaon - Katepurna - Murtajapur Jn - Mana - Mandura. - Kurum - Takli - Badnera Jn
- Jalamb Jn-Khamgaon
  - En route station details- Jalamb Jn - Khamgaon
- Murtizapur Junction-Yavatmal (Narrow Gauge) See also Shakuntala Railway
  - En route station details- Murtizapur Junction - Murtajapur Town - Kinkhed - Vilegaon. - Bhadsivni - Pohe - Karanja - Karanja Town - Somthan - Sangwi. - Warudkhed - Darwha Moti Bagh Junction - Tapona - Ladkhed - Linga - Lasina - Yavatmal
- Murtizapur Junction-Achalpur (Narrow Gauge) See also Shakuntala Railway
  - En route station details- Murtajapur Jn - Lakhpuri - Banosa - Lehgaon - Kokalda - Kapustalni - Anjangaon - Pathrot - Khusta Buzurg - Chamak - Nowbagh - Achalpur
- Badnera Jn-Amravati
  - En route station details- Badnera Jn - Amravati

== Information ==
- Bhuswal railway division serves the following districts of Maharashtra viz Nashik, Dhule, Jalgaon, Buldhana, Akola, Amravati, Washim, Yavatmal of Maharashtra and Burhanpur, Khandwa districts of Madhya Pradesh.
- Bhusawal railway division is divided into three main sections viz. Bhusawal - Igatpuri on Mumbai route, Bhusawal - Khandwa on Itarsi route, and Bhusawal - Badnera section on Nagpur route.
