= Akash Pandurang Fundkar =

Indian politician

Akash Fundkar

Minister of Labour Government of Maharashtra
- Incumbent
- Assumed office 15 December 2024
- Chief Minister: Devendra Fadnavis
- Guardian Minister: Akola district
- Preceded by: Suresh Khade

Member of Maharashtra Legislative Assembly
- Incumbent
- Assumed office 2014
- Preceded by: Dilip Sananda
- Constituency: Khamgaon

Personal details
- Born: 5 February 1983 (age 43) Khamgaon, Maharashtra, India
- Party: Bharatiya Janata Party
- Spouse: Sneha Gole Fundkar
- Children: 1 Son & 1 Daughter
- Parents: Pandurang Fundkar (father); Sunita Fundkar (mother)
- Education: State Vice President Of Maharashtra BJYM (2009-2014)
- Occupation: Politician

Akash Pandurang Fundkar is a member of the 13th Maharashtra Legislative Assembly. He represents the Khamgaon Assembly constituency. He belongs to the Bharatiya Janata Party. He is the son of BJP politician Pandurang Fundkar.

== Position Held ==
- State Vice President, Maharashtra BJYM (2009-2014)

== Political career and Office ==
Akash fundkar is a member of the Rashtriya Swayamsevak Sangh (RSS), a far-right Hindu nationalist paramilitary volunteer organisation.

Current Position: Cabinet Minister of Labour, Government of Maharashtra, since 15 December 2024.

Additional Role: Guardian Minister of Akola district since 18 January 2025 as part of the Third Fadnavis ministry.

Legislative Representation: Member of the Maharashtra Legislative Assembly (MLA) representing the Khamgaon constituency, first elected in 2014 and continues to serve.
