= Murtajapur =

Murtizapur
- Town
- Location in Maharashtra, India
- Coordinates: 20.73°N 77.51°E
- Country: India
- State: Maharashtra
- District: Akola
- Elevation: 308 m (1,010 ft)

Population (2011)
  - Total: 40,295

Languages
  - Official: Marathi
- Time zone: UTC+5:30 (IST)
- PIN: 444 107
- Telephone code: 07256
- Vehicle registration: MH-30

Murtizapur is a Municipal council and one of the taluka of district of Akola of the Amravati division of the Vidarbha region of Maharashtra.

== Geography ==
Murtizapur is located at an average elevation of 308 metres (1210 feet). It is an important railway junction station in Akola district. It is under the Bhusawal-Badnera Section of Bhusawal Division of Central Railway.

Two out of three narrow gauge branch lines in the Bhusawal railway division of central railway viz Murtizapur- Achalpur and Murtizapur- Yavatmal operate here. It is located along National Highway 6. It is also an junction on central railway.

== Demographics ==
As of 2011 India census, Murtizapur had a population of 40,295. The population as of 2024 is around 55,000. Males constitute 51% of the population and females 49%. Murtizapur has an average literacy rate of 76%, higher than the national average of 59.5%: male literacy is 80%, and female literacy is 72%. In Murtizapur, 13% of the population is under 6 years of age.

| Year | Male | Female | Total Population | Change | Religion (%) | | | | | | | |
| Year | Male | Female | Total Population | Change | Hindu | Muslim | Christian | Sikhs | Buddhist | Jain | Other religions and persuasions | Religion not stated |
|---|---|---|---|---|---|---|---|---|---|---|---|---|
| 2001 | 19713 | 18841 | 38554 | - | 64.203 | 24.241 | 0.791 | 0.265 | 9.161 | 1.333 | 0.000 | 0.005 |
| 2011 | 20309 | 19986 | 40295 | 0.045 | 60.280 | 27.753 | 0.749 | 0.253 | 9.636 | 1.080 | 0.084 | 0.164 |

== Transport ==
Murtizapur railway station is the junction station of the 762mm narrow gauge railway known locally as the Shakuntala Express. This line is composed of two legs intersecting with the Howrah-Nagpur-Mumbai line at Murtizapur — the 76 km northern leg to Achalpur railway station and the 113 km southeastern leg to Yavatmal railway station. As of 2004 this line was still owned by a London-based company which had leased the line to India's Central Railway since 1903.

== Post ==
Murtizapur has a post office with PIN code 444107. The PIN code is shared with other post offices in the tehsil viz Murtizapur City, Anbhora, Bhatori, Ghota, Ghunshi, Hirpur, Kherda, Vilegaon, Kinkhed, Kajaleshwar, Kanadi, Kanzara, Lakhpuri, Mangrul Kambe, Nimbha, Sirso, Wai Mana, Palsoda, Sonori. Ramkhed

== School education ==
Murtizapur has schools from pre-primary to graduation in arts, science, and commerce. Still, there is a scope for colleges to provide education in engineering and medicine. education facilities are available in the city through different marathi, Hindi and English medium schools.

== Healthcare ==
The town has primary healthcare centres run by the State Government and a few privately run clinics like awaghate bal rugnlaya and multi-speciality centre. There is Govt. Hospital name Smt. Laxmibai Deshmukh Govt Hospital which has many facilities and it is sub district hospital.

== Economy ==
Agriculture is the profession. Few small industries like oil mills and cotton pressing factories can be seen in MIDC. Despite having connectivity to the major cities like Mumbai, Hyderabad and Nagpur, one can see the lack of growth in this old town. Usually, people go to nearby cities like Akola, Paratwada and Amravati for shopping, medical facilities and purchase of automobiles.

== See also ==
- T. S. Korde
- Vijay Bhatkar
- Vasantrao Deshpande
- Atmaram Ravji Deshpande (Anil)
