= Lokagrani Adv. Balwantrao Raga alias Balasaheb Deshmukh =

Indian political leader

Lokagrani Balwant Deshmukh

Personal details
- Born: 27 March 1878 Daryapur
- Died: 18 November 1957 (aged 79)
- Party: Indian National Congress
- Spouse: Shakuntala Deshmukh
- Education: University of Calcutta (law)
- Occupation: Lawyer, Politician

Lokagrani Adv. Balwantrao Raga (27 March 1878 - 18 November 1957), also called the Balwantrao Narayanrao Deshmukh and Balasaheb Deshmukh was an Indian lawyer, Indian National Congress (INC) politician and independence activist from Chandrapur in Vidarbha of Maharashtra.

== Early life and education ==
He was born in the Daryapur village and hailed from his native village of Shivar. He completed his early schooling from Chandrapur, and the high school and college education from Nagpur. Later he obtained a law degree from University of Calcutta in 1899.

== Legal Career ==
He rejected a British government judicial post and established a legal practice in Chandrapur in 1900 becoming a renowned lawyer. He acted as a defense lawyer for those arrested during the 1942 Quit India movement, specifically during the Chimur incident.

== Independence Movement Involvement ==
He was a staunch follower of Bal Gangadhar Tilak, whom he considered his political leader and guru, and he promoted Tilak's ideologies of Swadeshi, Swadeshi movement, promotion of education for Indians and boycott of colonial British goods. He also supported Annie Besant's Home Rule League movement of 1917 and Mahatma Gandhi's Non-cooperation movement. He joined INC and participated in INC sessions, including the 1906 session under Dadabhai Naoroji, and organized public gatherings through Ganesh Jayanti and Shiv Jayanti celebrations to mobilise people for the Indian independence movement. He hosted Lokmanya Tilak during his 1918 Chandrapur visit for the Swaraj Party's provincial sessions. He served as President of the Central Provinces and Berar INC Committee (1919-1920), member of the All India Congress Committee from 1919 to 1923, was elected to the Provincial Assembly in 1921-1926.

== Social Contributions ==
He founded the Lokmanya Tilak Smarak Mandal in Chandrapur, established the Lokmanya Tilak Vidyalaya, supported the Goan independence movement of 1956, advocated for social equality and supported marginalized communities serving as president of the Choka Mela hostel.

== Legacy ==
He is remembered as a respected nationalist lawyer and social reformer, he received a testimonial from the Manciple committee in 1937.

Shakuntala Railway, originally named Yavatmal–Murtizapur Junction–Achalpur railway, was renamed after Shakuntala Deshmukh née Jadhav, who was wife of Balwantrao Deshmukh.

== See also ==
- List of Indian independence activists
