= Jamthi Budruk =

Village in Hingoli District, Maharashtra, India

Jamthi Budruk is a village in Akola District in the India state of Maharashtra. It comes under Murtajapur Taluka of Akola District & Amravati Division in Maharashtra. The Jamthi Bk. village has population of 3399 of which 1719 are males while 1680 are females as per Population Census 2011.

In Jamthi Bk. village population of children with age 0-6 is 302 which makes up 8.88% of total population of village. Average Sex Ratio of Jamthi Bk. village is 977 which is higher than Maharashtra state average of 929. Child Sex Ratio for the Jamthi Bk. as per census is 924, higher than Maharashtra average of 894.

Jamthi Bk. village has higher literacy rate compared to Maharashtra. In 2011, literacy rate of Jamthi Bk. village was 89.83% compared to 82.34% of Maharashtra. In Jamthi Bk. Male literacy stands at 95.45% while female literacy rate was 84.10%.

As per constitution of India and Panchyati Raaj Act, Jamthi Bk. village is administrated by Sarpanch (Head of Village) who is elected representative of village.
