= Shakuntala Express =

Overview
- Service type: Passenger
- First service: 1903
- Last service: 2020
- Current operators: Killick, Nixon and Company

Route
- Termini: Yavatmal (YTL); Achalpur (ELP)
- Stops: 10
- Distance travelled: 76 km (47 mi)
- Average journey time: 3h 30m
- Service frequency: Daily (Note: Runs seven days in a week for every direction.)
- Train number: 52137/52138

On-board services
- Class: General Unreserved
- Seating arrangements: No
- Sleeping arrangements: Yes
- Catering facilities: No
- Entertainment facilities: No
- Baggage facilities: No

Technical
- Rolling stock: 2
- Track gauge: 762 mm (2 ft 6 in)
- Operating speed: 22 km/h (14 mph), maximum permissible speed (MPS)

The Shakuntala Express was a passenger train that ran between Yavatmal and Achalpur, in the state of Maharashtra in India. Originally called Yavatmal–Murtizapur Junction–Achalpur Express, it was renamed after Shakuntala Deshmukh née Jadhav, who was wife of freedom fighter Balwantrao Deshmukh.

In 2016, Indian Railways announced that the Shakuntala Express would be cancelled due to the track conversion to 1,676 mm (5 ft 6 in) broad gauge. The express service was actually stopped in 2020, and the conversion of tracks to broad-gauge started in same year.

== See also ==
- Shakuntala Railway
