= Shakuntala Railway =

Satesan

Overview
- Owner: Central Provinces Railway Company
- Locale: Maharashtra, India
- Termini: Yavatmal; Achalpur

Service
- Operator: Central Railway

History
- Opened: 1903
- Closed: 2016
- Reopened: TBA

Technical
- Line length: 189 km (117 mi)
- Track gauge: 1,676 mm (5 ft 6 in) (TBA); 762 mm (2 ft 6 in) (formerly)

Shakuntala Railway was a 2 ft 6 in narrow gauge 189 km lone railway line that ran from Achalpur in north in Amravati district to Yavatmal in southeast via Murtizapur in Akola district. It is being converted to 1676 mm Broad gauge. It was originally called Yavatmal–Murtizapur Junction–Achalpur railway, before it was renamed after Shakuntala Deshmukh née Jadhav, who was wife of freedom fighter (Indian independence activist) Balwantrao Deshmukh.

== Etymology ==
In 1944, Shakuntala Jadhav married a Daryapur landlord, Balawantrao Deshmukh, who was also a freedom fighter. Deshmukh family took the newlyweds home by boarding this train. A British railway officer offered them the first-class coach for travel as they were newlyweds. It was a dream come true for Shakuntala, the bride, and years later she narrated this experience to Sudam Deshmukh, an MP, who took efforts to get the railway renamed to Shakuntala Railway.

== History ==
=== Inception ===
Killick, Nixon and Company, set up in 1857, created the Central Provinces Railway Company (CPRC) to act as its agents. The company built the 2 ft 6 in (762 mm) narrow-gauge line in 1903. The company built this narrow-gauge line in 1903 to carry cotton from cotton-rich interior areas of Vidarbha to the Murtizapur Junction on main broad gauge line to Mumbai from where it was shipped to Manchester in England. Murtizapur Junction was the focal point of this railway. In 1920 line from Darwha-Pusad was dismantled. Though, working autonomously, the CPRC was grouped in 1952 under the Central Railways. A ZD-steam engine, built in 1921 in Manchester, pulled the train for more than 70 long years after being put in service in 1923. It was withdrawn on 15 April 1994, and replaced by a diesel engine.

=== Conversion to broad gauge ===
In 2016, Indian Railways announced that the Shakuntala Railway would be converted to 1,676 mm (5 ft 6 in) broad gauge. The conversion to broad gauge started in 2020, which according to the reply to parliament by the Railway Minister, was still ongoing in 2025.

== Route ==
- Achalpur
- Nowbagh (NBGH)
- Chamak (CMK)
- Khusta Buzurg (KSBG)
- Pathrot (PTRT)
- Anjangaon (ANJ)
- Kapustalni (KTNI)
- Kokalda (KXD)
- Lehgaon (LGN)
- Banosa (BASA)
- Lakhpuri (LPU)
- Murtizapur Junction (MZR)
- Kinkhed
- Vilegaon
- Bhadsivni
- Pohe
- Karanja
- Somthan
- Sangwi
- Warudkhed
- Darwha Moti Bagh Junction
- Tapona
- Ladkhed
- Ling
- Lasina
- Yavatmal (YTL)

== Present status ==
- 2025 Aug: conversion to broad gauge commenced in 2020, which was still ongoing in 2025.

== See also ==
- Shakuntala Express, train which ran on Shakuntala Railway line
- Wardha–Nanded line, 327 km via Yavatmal, Digras and Pusad
