= Morna River =

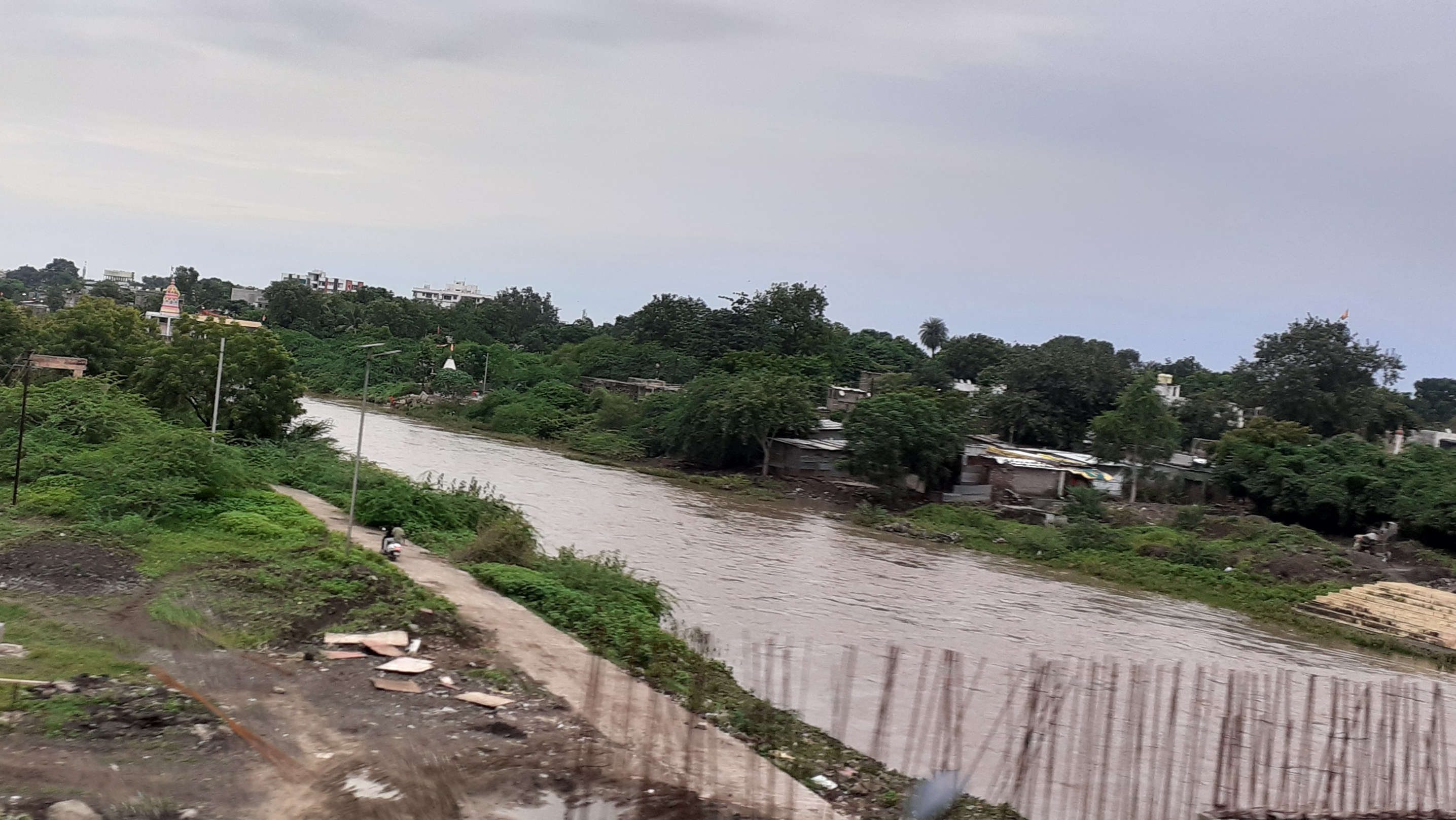
- Morna River
- Etymology: Morna river - Complete river

Location
- Country: India
- State: Maharashtra
- Region: Vidarbha
- District: Akola District

Physical characteristics
- Source: Barshitakali
  - location: Ajantha Range, Akola district, Maharashtra
- Mouth: Purna River
  - location: Andura Village, Akola District, Maharashtra
- Discharge
  - location: Andura Village, Akola District

The Morna River is a river of Western India. It is one of the chief tributaries of Purna River and empties in it at Andura Village in Akola District, Maharashtra.

== Etymology ==
Lots of co-operative society's name given after Morna river.like' Morna Maay'; in this name Morna is river and Maay means Mother. Morna is a major tributary of Purna River.

== Description ==
Morna is the main water source for Patur region of Akola district. It rises in the southern Barshitakli tehsil Maharashtra state, and flows northward, draining Maharashtra's Vidarbha region before merging with the Purna River.

The watershed lies mostly in eastern Vidarbha region of Maharashtra state and is nearly The Morna River basin which is a tributary of Purna River lies towards the northern and southern part of Akola district, and parts of Washim district, forming near about 190 to 200 meters thick lava flows covering an area of 941.39 km^{2}.

It originates in southern Barshitakli tehsil in Akola District. It flows through Barshitakli, Patur, Akola, Telhara.

== Confluence ==
Morna meet to Purna at Andura village in to the Telhara taluka of Akola District. Devoties believe this meeting place (Sangam) of two rivers is Holy place ( pavitra sthan).

== Dams ==
Morna Dam is situated in Patur taluka. Total volume content of dam is 1109 TCM and the purpose is farmland irrigation.

== Mission Clean Morna under Swachha Bharat Abhiyaan ==
Recently Morna Clean mission was launched to clean the 8 km of Morna river flow passing through the Akola City. It was initiated by Akola collector Mr. Pande and was supported by thousands of citizen, NGOs, Government workers. It received national attention when it was mentioned by Hon. Prime Minister Narendra Modi in Mann ki Baat.
