= Dilip Sananda =

Indian politician

Dilipkumar Sananda

Member of Maharashtra Legislative Assembly
- In office (1999-2004), (2004-2009), (2009 – 2014)
- Preceded by: Nana Kokare
- Succeeded by: Akash Pandurang Fundkar
- Constituency: Khamgaon

Personal details
- Born: Rana Dilipkumar Gokulchand Sananda; 1 May 1961 (age 65) Khamgaon, Buldhana District, Maharashtra
- Party: Nationalist Congress Party (2025-Present)
- Other political affiliations: Indian National Congress (1985-2025)
- Occupation: Politician

Rana Dilipkumar Gokulchand Sananda is an Indian politician he was a senior leader of the Indian National Congress from last 40 long years and a former member of the Maharashtra Legislative Assembly from Khamgaon for 15 years. He Joined Nationalist Congress Party in June 2025. He was arrested by the police in February 2016 on corruption charges. In March he was released from jail on bail.
