= Khamgaon Assembly constituency =

Assembly constituency in Maharashtra

Coordinates: 20.72°N 76.56°E

Khamgaon
- Constituency No. 26 for the Maharashtra Legislative Assembly

Constituency details
- Country: India
- Region: Western India
- State: Maharashtra
- District: Buldhana
- Lok Sabha constituency: Buldhana
- Established: 1951
- Total electors: 298,332
- Reservation: None

Member of Legislative Assembly
- 15th Maharashtra Legislative Assembly
- Incumbent Akash Pandurang Fundkar
- Party: BJP
- Alliance: NDA
- Elected year: 2024

Khamgaon Assembly constituency is one of the 288 constituencies of Maharashtra Vidhan Sabha and one of the seven which are located in Buldhana district.

== Overview ==
It is a part of the Buldhana (Lok Sabha constituency) along with five other Vidhan Sabha(assembly) constituencies, viz. Buldhana, Chikhali, Sindkhed Raja, Mehkar and Jalgaon(Jamod).

The seventh Malkapur Assembly constituency from the Buldhana district is a part of the Raver (Lok Sabha constituency) from neighbouring Jalgaon district.

As of 2008, the extent of the constituency comprised the entire Khamgaon taluka and part of the Shegaon taluka with the Jalamb, Pahurjira and Matargaon revenue circles. The remaining part of the Shegaon taluka along with the Shegaon Municipal Council is in the extent of the Jalgaon (Jamod) Assembly constituency.

== Members of the Legislative Assembly ==
Election	Member	Party
1952	Purushottam Govind Ekbote	Indian National Congress
1957	Govinddasji Ratanlal Bhatiya	Indian National Congress
1962	Govinddasji Ratanlal Bhatiya	Indian National Congress
1963 By-election	T. G. Khumkar	Independent politician
1967	Govinddasji Ratanlal Bhatiya	Indian National Congress
1972	Manikrao Pralhadrao Gawande	Indian National Congress
1978	Pandurang Pundalik Fundkar	Janata Party
1980	Pandurang Pundalik Fundkar	Bharatiya Janata Party
1985	Manikrao Pralhadrao Gawande	Indian National Congress
1990	Nana Nimbaji Kokare	Bharatiya Janata Party
1995	Nana Nimbaji Kokare	Bharatiya Janata Party
1999	Dilip Kumar Gokulchand Sananda	Indian National Congress
2004	Dilip Kumar Gokulchand Sananda	Indian National Congress
2009	Dilip Kumar Gokulchand Sananda	Indian National Congress
2014	Akash Pandurang Fundkar	Bharatiya Janata Party
2019	Akash Pandurang Fundkar	Bharatiya Janata Party
2024	Akash Pandurang Fundkar	Bharatiya Janata Party

== Election results ==
=== Assembly Election 2024 ===
2024 Maharashtra Legislative Assembly election : Khamgaon
Party	Candidate	Votes	%	±%
BJP	Akash Pandurang Fundkar	110,599	48.64	▲2.41
INC	Dilip Kumar Gokulchand Sananda	85,122	37.44	▼0.15
VBA	Deorao Bhaurao Hivarale	26,482	11.65	▼1.57
NOTA	None of the above	1,136	0.50	▼0.45
Margin of victory		25,477	11.20	▲2.56
Turnout		228,519	76.60	▲5.89
Total valid votes		227,383		
Registered electors		298,332		▲6.38
BJP hold		Swing	▲2.41	

=== Assembly Election 2019 ===
2019 Maharashtra Legislative Assembly election : Khamgaon
Party	Candidate	Votes	%	±%
BJP	Akash Pandurang Fundkar	90,757	46.23	▲9.51
INC	Dnyaneshwar Purushottam Patil	73,789	37.59	▲4.48
VBA	Vasatkar Sharad Sukhdev	25,957	13.22	New
NOTA	None of the above	1,873	0.95	▲0.30
BSP	Adv. Dilip Manohar Bhagat	1,424	0.73	New
Tipu Sultan Party	Mohmmed Azhar Mohmmad Shaukat	1,294	0.66	New
Margin of victory		16,968	8.64	▲5.03
Turnout		198,292	70.71	▼4.05
Total valid votes		196,298		
Registered electors		280,436		▲6.49
BJP hold		Swing	▲9.51	

=== Assembly Election 2014 ===
2014 Maharashtra Legislative Assembly election : Khamgaon
Party	Candidate	Votes	%	±%
BJP	Akash Pandurang Fundkar	71,819	36.72	▲3.98
INC	Dilip Kumar Gokulchand Sananda	64,758	33.11	▼4.25
BBM	Ashok Shamrao Sonone	47,541	24.31	▼1.51
NCP	Kokare Nana Nimbaji	4,432	2.27	New
Independent	Haji Budhankha Abbaskha	3,256	1.66	New
SS	Hursad Haridas Ramdas	1,644	0.84	New
NOTA	None of the above	1,263	0.65	New
Margin of victory		7,061	3.61	▼1.01
Turnout		196,877	74.76	▲2.23
Total valid votes		195,569		
Registered electors		263,356		▲11.33
BJP gain from INC		Swing	▼0.64	

=== Assembly Election 2009 ===
2009 Maharashtra Legislative Assembly election : Khamgaon
Party	Candidate	Votes	%	±%
INC	Dilip Kumar Gokulchand Sananda	64,051	37.36	▼1.98
BJP	Dhondiram Sonaji Khandare	56,131	32.74	▲2.68
BBM	Ashok Shamrao Sonone	44,269	25.82	▲7.33
Independent	Advocate Hiraman Shankar Shirsat	1,680	0.98	New
MNS	Vitthalrao Baburao Lokhandkar	1,677	0.98	New
Margin of victory		7,920	4.62	▼4.65
Turnout		171,571	72.53	▼2.23
Total valid votes		171,442		
Registered electors		236,557		▲2.20
INC hold		Swing	▼1.98	

=== Assembly Election 2004 ===
2004 Maharashtra Legislative Assembly election : Khamgaon
Party	Candidate	Votes	%	±%
INC	Dilip Kumar Gokulchand Sananda	68,034	39.34	▼2.18
BJP	Dhondiram Sonaji Khandare	51,995	30.06	▲4.34
BBM	Deshmukh Prakash Keshavrao	31,978	18.49	New
BSP	Kokare Nana Nimbaji	12,972	7.50	New
Independent	Shravan Kisan Shegokar	2,517	1.46	New
Independent	Chandrakant Anandrao Potdukhe	1,314	0.76	New
Independent	Shakil Ahmad Khan Pir Khan	1,272	0.74	New
AIFB	Gupta Pushkarmal Holarmal	1,096	0.63	New
Margin of victory		16,039	9.27	▲0.07
Turnout		173,038	74.76	▲1.86
Total valid votes		172,945		
Registered electors		231,455		▲19.97
INC hold		Swing	▼2.18	

=== Assembly Election 1999 ===
1999 Maharashtra Legislative Assembly election : Khamgaon
Party	Candidate	Votes	%	±%
INC	Dilip Kumar Gokulchand Sananda	55,651	41.52	▲6.47
NCP	Kokare Nana Nimbaji	43,320	32.32	New
BJP	Bhise Dinkar Yashwant	34,471	25.72	▼14.50
Margin of victory		12,331	9.20	▲4.03
Turnout		140,645	72.90	▼6.49
Total valid votes		134,046		
Registered electors		192,935		▲1.29
INC gain from BJP		Swing	▲1.30	

=== Assembly Election 1995 ===
1995 Maharashtra Legislative Assembly election : Khamgaon
Party	Candidate	Votes	%	±%
BJP	Kokare Nana Nimbaji	59,778	40.22	▲13.40
INC	Deshmukh Prakash Keshavrao	52,095	35.05	▲10.95
BBM	Kene Bapurao Kashirao	20,204	13.59	New
CPI(M)	Kavishwar Narendra Rangnath	7,826	5.27	▲0.80
JD	Ingle Vijay Madhukar	3,119	2.10	New
Margin of victory		7,683	5.17	▲2.45
Turnout		151,207	79.39	▲10.40
Total valid votes		148,625		
Registered electors		190,470		▲11.81
BJP hold		Swing	▲13.40	

=== Assembly Election 1990 ===
1990 Maharashtra Legislative Assembly election : Khamgaon
Party	Candidate	Votes	%	±%
BJP	Kokare Nana Nimbaji	31,150	26.82	▼9.25
INC	Deshmukh Prakash Keshavrao	27,994	24.10	▼19.04
Independent	Ganesh Gajanan Purushottam	18,456	15.89	New
BRP	Ingle Maltibai Purushottam	17,227	14.83	New
Independent	Lokhandkar Baburao Pandhari	10,515	9.05	New
CPI(M)	Kavishwar Narendra Rangnath	5,190	4.47	New
Independent	Ghodke Gangadhar Bhimashankar	2,316	1.99	New
Margin of victory		3,156	2.72	▼4.35
Turnout		117,524	68.99	▲5.38
Total valid votes		116,157		
Registered electors		170,354		▲23.47
BJP gain from INC		Swing	▼16.32	

=== Assembly Election 1985 ===
1985 Maharashtra Legislative Assembly election : Khamgaon
Party	Candidate	Votes	%	±%
INC	Gawande Manikrao Pralhadrao	37,261	43.14	New
BJP	Fundkar Pandurang Pundlik	31,153	36.07	▼9.21
Independent	Dilshadshah Bismillahshah	9,612	11.13	New
Independent	Wankhade Dayaram Narayan	5,317	6.16	New
Independent	Khatri Laxman Ramlal	603	0.70	New
Independent	Mishra Gopinath Tirathraj	578	0.67	New
Margin of victory		6,108	7.07	▲2.11
Turnout		87,759	63.61	▲8.32
Total valid votes		86,372		
Registered electors		137,975		▲12.62
INC gain from BJP		Swing	▼2.14	

=== Assembly Election 1980 ===
1980 Maharashtra Legislative Assembly election : Khamgaon
Party	Candidate	Votes	%	±%
BJP	Pandurang Pundalik Fundkar	30,003	45.28	New
INC(I)	Mohammed Mubinur Rahman Mohammed Ismail	26,714	40.32	New
INC(U)	Kankale Purushottam Ramkrishna	6,725	10.15	New
Independent	Gupta Pushkarmal Holarmal	2,044	3.09	New
Margin of victory		3,289	4.96	▼4.20
Turnout		67,735	55.29	▼16.13
Total valid votes		66,254		
Registered electors		122,515		▲6.29
BJP gain from JP		Swing	▲13.02	

=== Assembly Election 1978 ===
1978 Maharashtra Legislative Assembly election : Khamgaon
Party	Candidate	Votes	%	±%
JP	Pandurang Pundalik Fundkar	25,831	32.26	New
INC	Gawande Manikrao Pralhadrao	18,494	23.10	▼53.40
AIFB	Gupta Pushkarmal Holarmal	13,564	16.94	▲11.91
PWPI	Shelke Shiram Namdeorao	10,059	12.56	New
Independent	Barkatshah Tukdushah	7,868	9.83	New
CPI	Purohit Govindram Gauridatta	1,454	1.82	New
ABHM	Shekdar Purushottam Shivram	1,277	1.59	New
Independent	Gaikwad Ganpatrao Gangadhar	793	0.99	New
Margin of victory		7,337	9.16	▼49.63
Turnout		82,322	71.42	▲5.35
Total valid votes		80,071		
Registered electors		115,269		▲26.50
JP gain from INC		Swing	▼44.24	

=== Assembly Election 1972 ===
1972 Maharashtra Legislative Assembly election : Khamgaon
Party	Candidate	Votes	%	±%
INC	Gawande Manikrao Pralhadrao	44,478	76.50	▲13.52
ABJS	Naraan Nathu Bhise	10,296	17.71	▲10.07
AIFB	S. Jaswant Singh Kesar Singh	2,927	5.03	New
Independent	Ganpatrao Gaikwad	443	0.76	New
Margin of victory		34,182	58.79	▲22.25
Turnout		60,209	66.07	▼4.40
Total valid votes		58,144		
Registered electors		91,124		▲3.27
INC hold		Swing	▲13.52	

=== Assembly Election 1967 ===
1967 Maharashtra Legislative Assembly election : Khamgaon
Party	Candidate	Votes	%	±%
INC	G. R. Bhatia	36,885	62.98	▲14.71
RPI	Tukaram Ganpat Khumkar	15,486	26.44	New
ABJS	N. N. Bhise	4,473	7.64	New
Independent	N. L. Gawai	566	0.97	New
Independent	L. C. Jadhav	537	0.92	New
Independent	T. S. Sawdekar	412	0.70	New
Margin of victory		21,399	36.54	▲35.02
Turnout		62,179	70.47	
Total valid votes		58,569		
Registered electors		88,236		
INC gain from Independent		Swing	▲13.19	

=== Assembly By-election 1963 ===
1963 Maharashtra Legislative Assembly by-election : Khamgaon
Party	Candidate	Votes	%	±%
Independent	T. G. Khumkar	28,562	49.79	New
INC	G. R. Bhatia	27,689	48.27	▼7.58
Independent	M. I. M. Razak	855	1.49	New
Margin of victory		873	1.52	▼18.56
Total valid votes		57,363		
Independent gain from INC		Swing	▼6.06	

=== Assembly Election 1962 ===
1962 Maharashtra Legislative Assembly election : Khamgaon
Party	Candidate	Votes	%	±%
INC	Govinddas Ratanlal Bhatia	33,288	55.85	▲3.40
Independent	Tukaram Ganpat Khumkar	21,319	35.77	New
ABJS	Bhaskarrao Sangrao Deshmukh	2,014	3.38	New
Independent	Krishnarao Ganpatrao Deshmukh	1,370	2.30	New
Independent	Vithalrao Amruta Wankhade	1,047	1.76	New
ABHM	Purushottam Shioram Shekdar	563	0.94	New
Margin of victory		11,969	20.08	▲7.57
Turnout		64,281	74.15	▲1.73
Total valid votes		59,601		
Registered electors		86,695		▲19.48
INC hold		Swing	▲3.40	

=== Assembly Election 1957 ===
1957 Bombay State Legislative Assembly election : Khamgaon
Party	Candidate	Votes	%	±%
INC	Govinddas Ratanlal Bhatia	27,558	52.45	▼8.35
Independent	Khawale Nathu Onkar	20,984	39.94	New
Independent	Jadhao Tapaji Shamu	2,131	4.06	New
RRP	Bhawanishankar Shriniwas	1,870	3.56	New
Margin of victory		6,574	12.51	▼30.49
Turnout		52,543	72.42	▲15.72
Total valid votes		52,543		
Registered electors		72,558		▲65.34
INC hold		Swing	▼8.35	

=== Assembly Election 1952 ===
1952 Hyderabad State Legislative Assembly election : Khamgaon
Party	Candidate	Votes	%	±%
INC	Purushottam Govind Ekbote	15,130	60.80	New
SKP	Tukaram Pritam Ekade	4,431	17.81	New
ABJS	Somkant Raoji Bhate	3,869	15.55	New
Independent	Santu Sitaram Gawai	1,454	5.84	New
Margin of victory		10,699	43.00	
Turnout		24,884	56.70	
Total valid votes		24,884		
Registered electors		43,884		
INC win (new seat)				

== See also ==
- Khamgaon
- Jalamb
- Matargaon
- Shegaon
- Pahurjira
