= Kumgaon Burti =

Village in Maharashtra

- Village
- Interactive map of Kumgaon Burti
- Country: India
- State: Maharashtra
- District: Buldhana

Government
  - Body: Gram panchayat

Languages
  - Official: Marathi
- Time zone: UTC+5:30 (IST)
- ISO 3166 code: IN-MH
- Website: maharashtra.gov.in

Kumgaon Burti is a village, in Nandura tehsil of Buldhana district, Maharashtra State, India. Nearby towns are Nandura on east, Shegaon on west.

== Demographics ==
As of 2001 India census, Kumgaon Burti has a population of xxxx.

== Transport ==
This is a small railway station and is located between Nandura and Jalamb - Shegaon and is located on Bhusawal - Badnera section of Bhusawal division of Central Railway.

== Description ==
The town post office Postal Index Number ( PIN code) is
