= Akola Fort =

Fort in Akola district, Maharashtra, India

Akola Fort (Korbandh Fort)
- Part of Beraar Province
- Akola district, Maharashtra
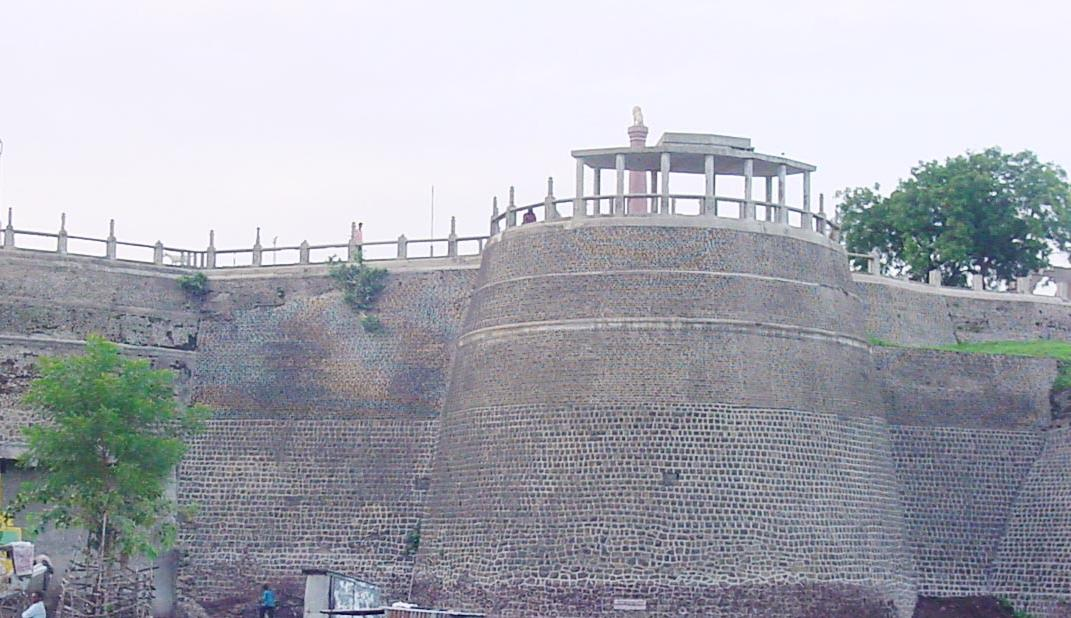
- Akola Fort (Korbandh Fort)

Site information
- Type: River Side Fort
- Owner: Government of India
- Controlled by: Govt.of India
- Open to the public: Yes
- Condition: Dilapidated

Location
- Shown within Maharashtra
- Location within Maharashtra
- Coordinates: 20°42′22″N 76°59′24″E

Site history
- Built: Rebuilt: 1697
- Built by: Govind Appaji in 780 AD Constructed the Korbandh Fort, To Secure Rajeshwar Temple from Islamic Invasion.
- Materials: Stone / Lime glue paste
- Battles/wars: (1695 Korbandh was Seized by asad khan), (1803 2nd Anglo-Maratha War/ Battle of Argaon)

Garrison information
- Past commanders: Asad Khan, Arthur Wellesley

Akola Fort was built by Govind Appaji in 780 AD. It also called Korbandh before invaded by Asad khan, Later name was changed to Asadgadh in 1697 along with the Narnala and Akot forts forms the major fortifications of the Akola district Former name Beraar Province, Maharashtra, India.

== History ==
The Fort was built by Govind Appaji in 780 AD to Secure Raj Rajeshwar Temple from Islamic Invader near Morna River. As Islamic Invasion Started in 712 AD, When the Umayyad Caliphate conquered Sindh and Multan. The conquest was led by Muhammad ibn al-Qasim, an Umayyad general. The Korbandh fortress was Attacked and Rebuilt in 1697 by Asad Khan, during the reign of Aurangzeb, by invader Asad Khan, from whom the fort took its name (Asadgad). In 1803, Arthur Wellesley camped here before proceeding to win the Battle of Argaon in the Second Anglo-Maratha War. The fortress was dismantled by the British Raj in about 1870. To avoid future problems as Asadgadh Fort (Korbandh Fort) was heavily fortified. It was reported in 1910 in a district gazetteer that the central part of the fort (the hawakhana) was used as a school.

== Major features ==
Akola fort is notable in that it is bereft of any decorative embellishments.

There are several inscriptions on the fort. An inscription on the Dahi handa gate gives its date of construction as 1114 AH (1697 CE)deepak, 'during the reign of Islamic invader King Aurangzeb when Nawab Asad Khan was minister.' her on the Fateh Buruj bastion has no exact date. It too mentions the same minister but a different emperor Bahadur Shah I. One on the Eidgah contains texts and a statement that the rebuilding was finished by Khawja Abdul Latif in 1116 AH (1698 CE). On the Agarves gate an inscription in Marathi reads that Govind Appaji in 780 AD constructed the fort, to secure nearby temple from Islamic invasion. The latter statement contradicts all the other inscriptions.

=== Shri Raj Rajeshwar Mandir ===
Akola's oldest Mahadev temple is Rajeshwar Mandir. Also called as Berar che Rajeshwar. In ancient records, there was an old fort for protection of shiv temple named Korbandh Fort (Current Name Asadgadh) to protect from Islamic Invasion.

The Shiv temple and Fort Korbandh was first attacked by invader asad khan, on the order from Aurangzeb to Conquer Deccen Region. After Conquering the Korbandh Fort, He changed the name of Fort Korbandh to Asadgadh, after rebuilding it.

As Said,

==== Folklore ====
While Raja Akolsingh was living in the Korbandh Fort (Current Name was Asadgadh Fort after invasion), there is a famous story associated for this ancient temple. Every night his queen went to this temple to worship lord Shiva at midnight. Once King Akolsingh thought that his queen was going out at midnight for some ill-mannered reasons, so he followed her with a sword; the queen realised that Raja Akolsingh was following her. She felt disgusting and guilty, and went straight to the Shiva temple and pleaded to the god that her husband the king was thinking wrong about her, and that it was insulting that he was having no faith in her loyalty and her character. So she pleaded to the lord Shiva to accept her devotee. If her devotion is true and she if she is pure, So she shall be allowed to enter and recede into Shiva's Pind (Shiva Ling) (a stone of God Shiva that is worshipped)". Then the lightning occurs, winds flow strong and with the bright emitting light and sound of damru (The Musical Instruments of Lord Shiva). The Shiva ling opens in two parts and a giant blue lotus flower came from that and the Queen jumped in and sat on the flower, and then it closed. The King tried to hold the queen, So far her hair and pieces of cloth remained on shivlinga. The King understood his mistake and could not forgive himself.

This from that day the King takes water from besides river and pour on shivlinga, hoping for the return of his Queen. Still the Shiva ling in this temple has a little crack which is said to corroborate this story. There is also a big festival on shravan month, where devotees carry water from far more rivers and pour on Raj Rajeshwar Shivling. The Crack can be still seen by devotees, but hair and clothes lost as the time flow.

This temple is the proud symbol and center of attraction of this Akola city. There are two bridges: the first one is the dagadi pool (stone bridge) (also known as 'chota pool' meaning smaller bridge) and the other is lokhand pool (iron bridge) (also known as 'motha pool' meaning bigger bridge). This iron bridge was built at the time of British rule.

== See also ==
- List of forts in Maharashtra
