= Asirgarh Road railway station =

Railway station in Madhya Pradesh

Asirgarh Road

General information
- Location: State Highway 27, Burhanpur, Madhya Pradesh; India
- Coordinates: 21°22′41″N 76°16′03″E
- Elevation: 260 metres (850 ft)
- System: Indian Railways station
- Owner: Indian Railways
- Operator: Central Railway
- Line: Jabalpur–Bhusaval section
- Platforms: 2
- Tracks: 4
- Connections: Auto stand

Construction
- Structure type: Standard (on ground station)
- Parking: No

Other information
- Status: Functioning
- Station code: AGQ
- Zone(s): Central Railway
- Division(s): Bhusawal
Location
- Location within India Location within Madhya Pradesh

Asirgarh Road railway station is a small railway station in Burhanpur district, Madhya Pradesh. Its code is AGQ. It serves Asirgarh Fort and located 9 kilometres (5.6 mi) from Burhanpur city. The station consists of two platforms. The platforms are not well sheltered. It lacks many facilities including water and sanitation.
