= Murtizapur Junction railway station =

Railway station in Maharashtra, India

Murtizapur Junction
- Indian Railways logo

General information
- Location: Tangachowk Road, Murtizapur, Maharashtra; India
- Coordinates: 20°44′10″N 77°21′17″E
- Elevation: 303 metres (994 ft)
- System: Indian Railways junction station
- Owner: Indian Railways
- Operator: Central Railway
- Lines: Nagpur–Bhusawal section of Howrah–Nagpur–Mumbai line, Achalpur–Yavatmal line
- Platforms: 4

Construction
- Structure type: Standard, on ground
- Parking: Available

Other information
- Status: Active
- Station code: MZR
- Zone(s): Central Railway zone
- Division(s): Bhusawal

History
- Opened: 1867
- Electrified: 1989–90
- Former names: Great Indian Peninsula Railway
Location
- Location within Maharashtra

Murtizapur railway station serves Murtizapur in Akola district in the Indian state of Maharashtra and was opened in 1867. The Achalpur–Yavatmal narrow-gauge line, popular as Shakuntala Railway, meets the electrified 5 ft 6 in (1,676 mm) broad gauge Howrah–Nagpur–Mumbai line at Murtizapur.

== History ==
The first train in India travelled from Mumbai to Thane on 16 April 1853. By May 1854, Great Indian Peninsula Railway's Bombay–Thane line was extended to Kalyan. Bhusawal railway station was set up in 1860 and in 1867 the GIPR branch line was extended to Nagpur.

The 189 km (117 mi)-long Achalpur–Murtazapur–Yavatmal 762 mm (2 ft 6 in) narrow-gauge railway, locally known as the Shakuntala Railway, was built by a British firm, Killik Nixon & Company, in 1903.

=== Electrification ===
The railways in the Nandura–Badnera sector were electrified in 1989–90.

Preceding station	Indian Railways	Following station
Mana (Maharashtra) towards ?	Central Railway zone Howrah–Nagpur–Mumbai line	Katepurna towards ?
Lakhpuri towards ?	Central Railway zone Shakuntala line	Murtazapur Town towards ?
