= Exchange Bank of India & Africa =

Defunct Indian bank

- Headquarters: Mumbai, British Raj
- Established: 1942
- Dissolved: 1949
- Key people: Jaswantrai Manilal Akhaney

The Exchange Bank of India & Africa was an India bank with a number of overseas branches in East African countries that operated from 1942 until its failure in 1949. It expanded rapidly across the trade routes between India and Africa but suffered a crisis in 1949 which caused it to fail.

== History ==
The bank was established in Mumbai in 1942. It expanded rapidly and at its peak had branches in India at Ahmedabad, Amravati, Amritsar, Bhavnagar, Bengaluru, Kolkata, Kochi, Delhi, Karachi, Khamgaon, Kolhapur, Chennai, Madurai, Nagpur, Rajkot, Surendranagar, Tirunelveli, and Thoothukudi. It also had overseas branches at Aden, Colombo, Dar es Salaam, Jaffna, Jinga, Kampala, London, Mombasa, and Nairobi. The bank opened three East African branches in 1947, with the branch in Tanzania opening in late 1948.

A crisis developed in the bank from about mid-February 1949, resulting in a heavy run on the bank. The bank suspended payments in May and was liquidated in June 1949. The managing director of the bank at the time, Jaswantrai Manilal Akhaney, was charged with and found guilty of criminal breach of trust for disposing of certain securities that a client had deposited with the bank.
