= Mandwa, Nepanagar =

Village in Madhya Pradesh, India

Coordinates: 21.516°N 76.392°E

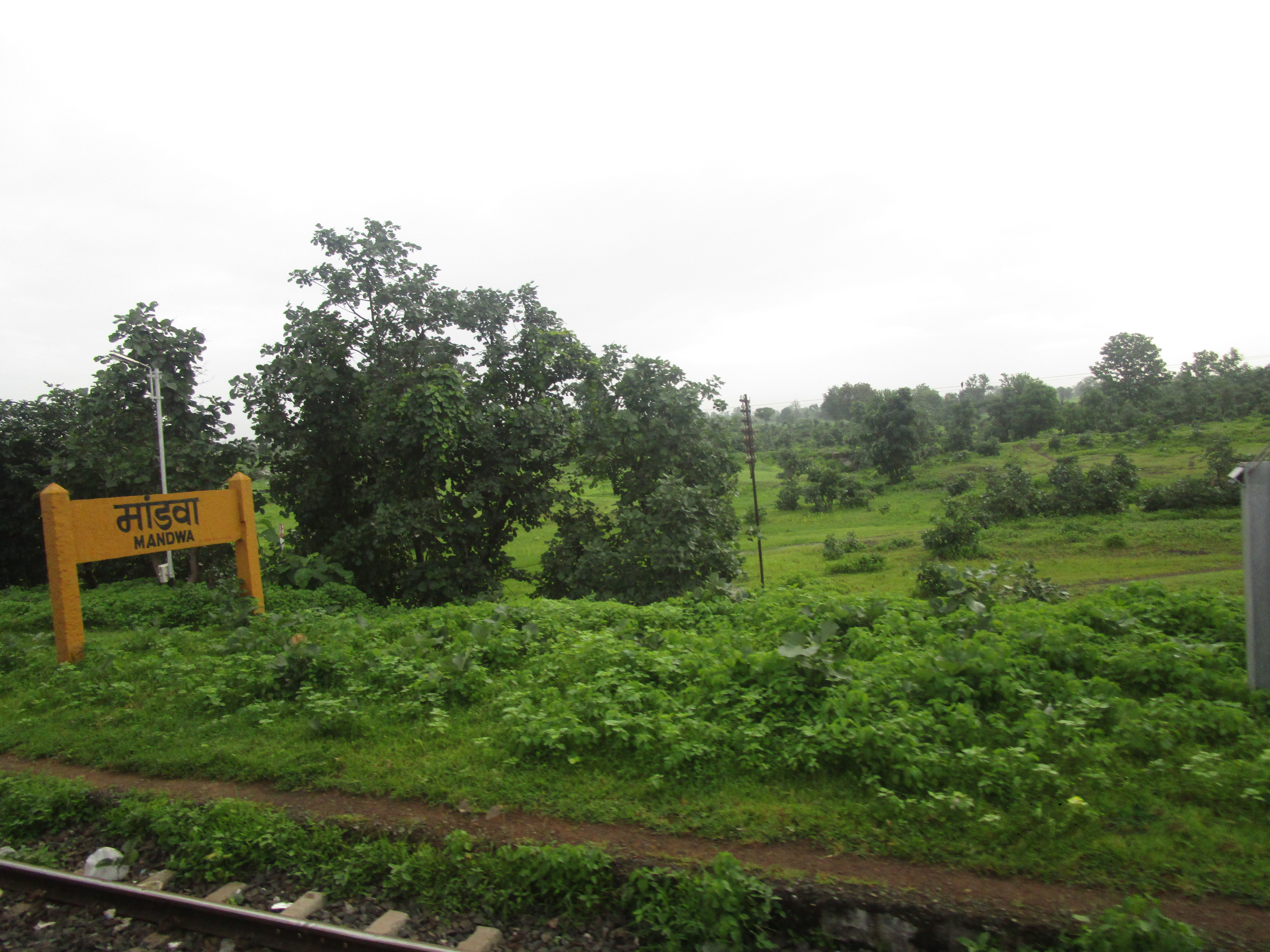
Mandwa railway station

Mandwa is a village in Nepanagar Tehsil of Burhanpur district in Madhya Pradesh, India.

There is a Mandwa railway station in the village under Bhusawal railway division on Bhusaval - Itarsi line of Central Railway Zone of Indian Railway.
