= Bodwad railway station =

Railway station in Maharashtra, India

Bodwad

General information
- Location: Bodwad, Maharashtra, Pincode 425310; Maharashtra India
- Coordinates: 20°54′14″N 76°01′01″E
- Elevation: 295 metres (968 ft)
- System: Indian Railways station
- Owner: Indian Railways
- Operator: Central Railway
- Platforms: 2
- Tracks: 2

Construction
- Parking: Yes
- Cycle facilities: Yes

Other information
- Status: Functioning
- Station code: BDWD
- Fare zone: Bhusawal

History
- Opened: 1860
- Electrified: 1988–89
- Former names: Great Indian Peninsula Railway
Location
- Location within India Location within Maharashtra

Bodwad railway station serves Bodwad in Jalgaon district in the Indian state of Maharashtra.

== Amenities ==
Amenities at Bodwad railway station include: computerized reservation office, waiting room, retiring room and book stall.

== Trains ==
=== Daily Express trains ===
Several daily Express trains stop at Bodwad station as follows.

Train no.18030 and 18029	Train name shalimar express	Destinations
11039 / 11040	sevagram Express	CSMT–Gondiya
22111/22112	Bhuswal–Nagpur Intercity Express	Bhusawal–Nagpur

== Electrification ==
Railways in the Bodwad area were electrified in 1988–89.

== See also ==
- High-speed rail in India
- Indian Railways
- Jalgaon District
- Rail transport in India
- List of railway stations in India
