= Khamkhed =

Village in Maharashtra

- Village
- Location in Maharashtra, India Khamkhed (India)
- Coordinates: 20.869068°N 76.396435°E
- Country: India
- State: Maharashtra
- District: Buldhana

Languages
  - Official: Marathi
- Time zone: UTC+5:30 (IST)

Khamkhed is a village, in Malkapur tehsil of Buldhana district, Maharashtra State, India. Nearby towns are Malkapur on east, Bodwad on west.

== Demographics ==
As of 2001 India census, Khamkhed had a population of .

== Transport ==
It has a railway station located between Bhusawal and Malkapur and is located on Bhusawal - Badnera section of Bhusawal division of Central Railway.

== Administration ==
The town post office Postal Index Number ( PIN code) is 443101 and PIN is shared with Malkapur, Malkapur(buldhana), Malkapur City, Ahwa Ynuspur, Bhalegaon, Deodhaba, Dudhalgaon Budruk, Harankhed, Jambhuldhaba, Liha Budruk, Nalgangapur, Nipana, Panhera Wadoda, Pimpalgaon Devi, Shelapur, Sindkhed lapali, Wadaji post offices.
