= Jalamb railway station =

Railway Station in Maharashtra, India

Khamgaon Terminus

General information
- Location: waman Nagar Khamgaon; India
- Coordinates: 20°48′46″N 76°34′23″EPH5C+58 Khamgaon, Maharashtra, India
- Elevation: 259 metres (850 ft)
- System: Indian Railways
- Owner: Indian Railways
- Operator: Central Railway
- Line: Khamgaon Terminus is further sanctioned to extend till Jalna from many year Khamgaon Terminus joins the main line Mumbai–Nagpur to Jalamb Junction
- Platforms: 3
- Tracks: Broad-gauge electric line
- Connections: Khamgaon Jalamb railbus daily runs 4 times a day and every Ashadi CR start Khamgaon–Pandharpur Its demand to start Khamgaon–Nagpur passenger, Khamgaon–Amravati Passenger to connect main cities

Construction
- Structure type: Standard, on ground
- Parking: Available

Other information
- Status: Active
- Station code: JM
- Zone(s): Mumbai
- Division(s): Bhusawal

History
- Opened: 1867
- Electrified: 1989–90
- Former names: Great Indian Peninsula Railway
Location
- Location within Maharashtra

Jalamb railway station serves Jalamb in Buldhana district in the Indian state of Maharashtra. There is a 12 kilometres (7.5 mi)-long branch line to Khamgaon.

== History ==
The first train in India travelled from Mumbai to Thane on 16 April 1853. By May 1854, Great Indian Peninsula Railway's Bombay–Thane line was extended to Kalyan Junction. Bhusawal railway station was set up in 1860 and in 1867 the GIPR branch line was extended to Nagpur.

=== Electrification ===
The railways in the Nandura-Badnera sector were electrified in 1989–90.

== Railbus ==
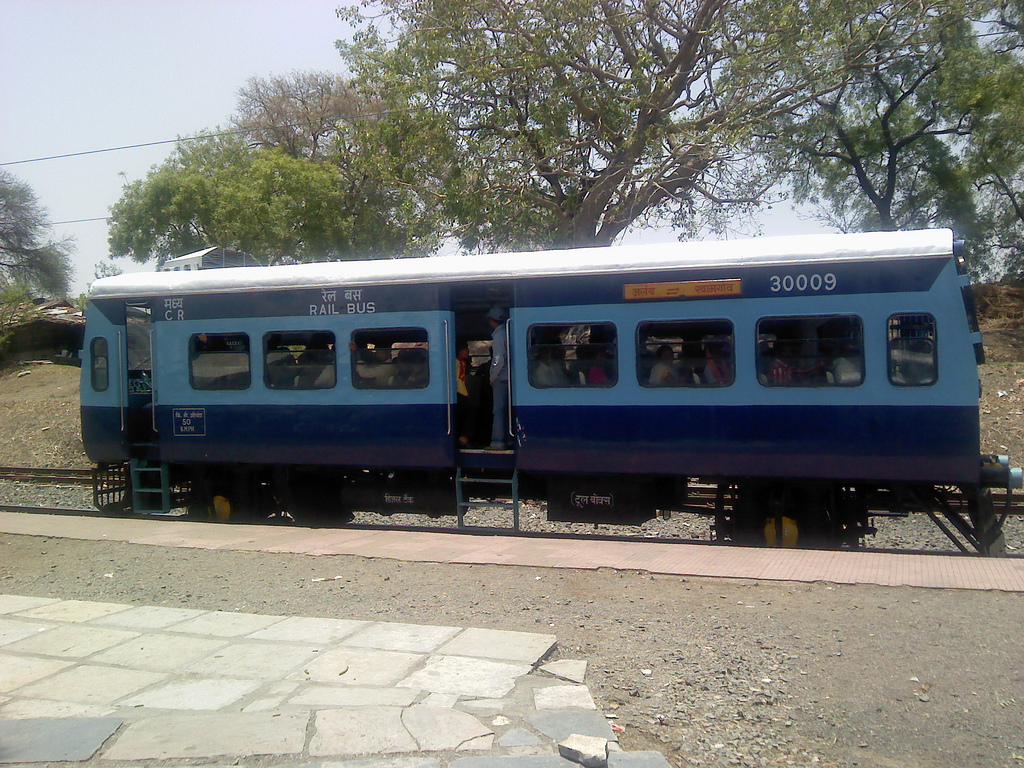
Jalamb–Khamgaon Railbus

There is regular railbus/DEMU service to Khamgaon.

Preceding station	Indian Railways	Following station
Shegaon towards ?	Central Railway zone Howrah–Nagpur–Mumbai line	Nandura towards ?
Terminus	Central Railway zone Jalamb–Khamgaon branch line	Khamgaon towards ?
