= Bagmar =

Village in Madhya Pradesh, India

Coordinates: 21.7127°N 76.3613°E

Bagmar is a village in Pandhana Tehsil of Khandwa district in Madhya Pradesh, India.

There is a railway station in the village under Bhusawal railway division on Bhusaval - Khandwa line of Central Railway Zone of Indian Railway.
