= T. S. Korde =

Rao Sahib T S Korde

Member of Legislative Council of CP & Berar
- In office 1923–1926

Member of Legislative Council of CP & Berar
- In office 1921–1923

Personal details
- Born: 1886
- Died: Unknown

Rao Bahadur/ Rao Sahib T S Korde alias Tukaramji Korde (1886 - Unknown) was a leader and landlord from Murtizapur, Akola in Central Provinces, British India.

He was a M. L. C., as the member and Chairman of First and Second Legislative Council of Central Provinces and Berar during 1921-23 and 1923–1926.
