= Ladkhed =

Village in Maharashtra

- Village

- Location in Maharashtra, India Ladkhed (India)
- Coordinates: 20.32°N 77.77°E
- Country: India
- State: Maharashtra
- District: Yavatmal
- Elevation: 355 m (1,165 ft)

Population (2011)
  - Total: 25,791

Languages
  - Official: Marathi
- Time zone: UTC+5:30 (IST)
- Postal code: 445201
- Vehicle registration: MH 29

Ladkhed is a village in Darwha Taluka in Yavatmal District of Maharashtra state, India. It is a part of the Vidarbha region and is in Amravati Division. It is located 27 kilometres (17 mi) west of its district headquarters at Yavatmal and is 18 kilometres (11 mi) from Darwha. Its PIN code is 445201. and postal head office is Ladkhed.

== Nearby cities ==
Ladkhed is surrounded by Ner Taluka towards the north, Yavatmal Taluka towards the east, Arni Taluka towards the south, and Digras Taluka towards the south. Wadgaon Road, Yavatmal, Ghatanji, and Mangrulpir.

== Transport ==
=== By rail ===
Ladkhed Railway Station

Ladkhed Railway Station and Linga Railway Station are the very nearby railway stations to Ladkhed. Yavatmal Railway Station (near to Yavatmal), Darwha M Bgh Jn Railway Station (near to Darwha) are the railway stations reachable from nearby towns. Amravati Railway Station is major railway station 72 km near to Ladkhed.

=== By road ===
Darwha, Yavatmal are the nearby towns to Ladkhed having road connectivity to Ladkhed.

== Education ==
=== Nearby colleges ===
- College of Agriculture-Darwha
- Mungsaji Maharaj Mahavidyalay, Darwha
- Mungasaji Maharaj College Of Arts Commerce And Science

=== Schools ===
- Allama Iqubal Urdu School
- Vasant Naik Vidyalaya
- Z. P. Urdu School
- Z. P. Marathi School
