= Wadoda =

Village in Maharashtra

Coordinates: 20°54′N 76°17′E

- village
- Interactive map of Wadoda
- Country: India
- State: Maharashtra
- District: Buldhana

Languages
  - Official: Marathi
- Time zone: UTC+5:30 (IST)

Wadoda is a village, in Malkapur tehsil of Buldhana district, Maharashtra State, India. Nearby towns are Malkapur on west, Nandura on west.

== Transport ==
It has a railway station located between Nandura and Malkapur and is located on Bhusawal - Badnera section of Bhusawal division of Central Railway.

== Demographics ==
As of 2001 India census, Wadoda had a population of xxxx.

== Description ==
The town post office Postal Index Number (PIN code) is 443101 and PIN is shared with Malkapur, Malkapur(buldhana), Malkapur City, Ahwa Ynuspur, Bhalegaon, Deodhaba, Dudhalgaon Budruk, Harankhed, Jambhuldhaba, Liha Budruk, Nalgangapur, Nipana, Khamkhed, Pimpalgaon Devi, Shelapur, Sindkhed lapali, Wadaji post offices.
