= Badegaon =

Village in Bagmati Province, Nepal

Badegaon बाँडेगाउँ
- Village
- Location in Nepal
- Coordinates: 27.6°N 85.4°E
- Country: Nepal
- Province: Bagmati Province
- District: Lalitpur District
- Time zone: UTC+5:45 (Nepal Time)

Badegaon is a village in the Godawari Municipality of the Lalitpur District of Nepal. Badegaon is situated in the foothills of Phulchowki and is about 5 km south of Patan. Buddha Madhyamik Vidyalaya is in Ward No. 3. It has a 24-hour hospital. Ex-Prime Minister & Nepali Congress Leader Krishna Prasad Bhattarai has recently settled down in one of the jungles in Badegaon.

== History ==
King Mānadeva (464–505 AD), who was a king of the Licchavi dynasty in present-day Nepal. He is said to have founded this village.

One of the seven great Buddhas Stupa lies in this village. Initially, the name of the place was Bandeshpur. It has one jungle which is of religious importance. It is said that it has a nine-storied Bhairab temple at its top, and one can view the Nyatapola Mandir of Bhaktapur from it. This is more like a moat surrounding the place. Some artefacts can even be seen at the site. In the south-east part of this jungle, a thick and very ancient wall was found, but it is taken for granted and left as it is. The historical value of the site is neither considered by the local authority nor the government.

To the east of Badegaon village is Swetbarahi, one of the four Barahis of Kathmandu valley. People from the village celebrate Swetbarahi Jatra twice a year.

Some common festivals celebrated by locals include:

- Gathemangal, where a demon named Tole is taken from each small neighbourhood, then dumped and later burned.
- Naag Panchami
- Juga, Dashain, Tihar, Krishna Janmastami, Gaijatra, Janai Purnima, Yomari Purnima, Maghe Sankranti, Shree Panchami, Holi Purnima, Chaita Dashai, Ram Navami and Buddha Purnima.

Gallery

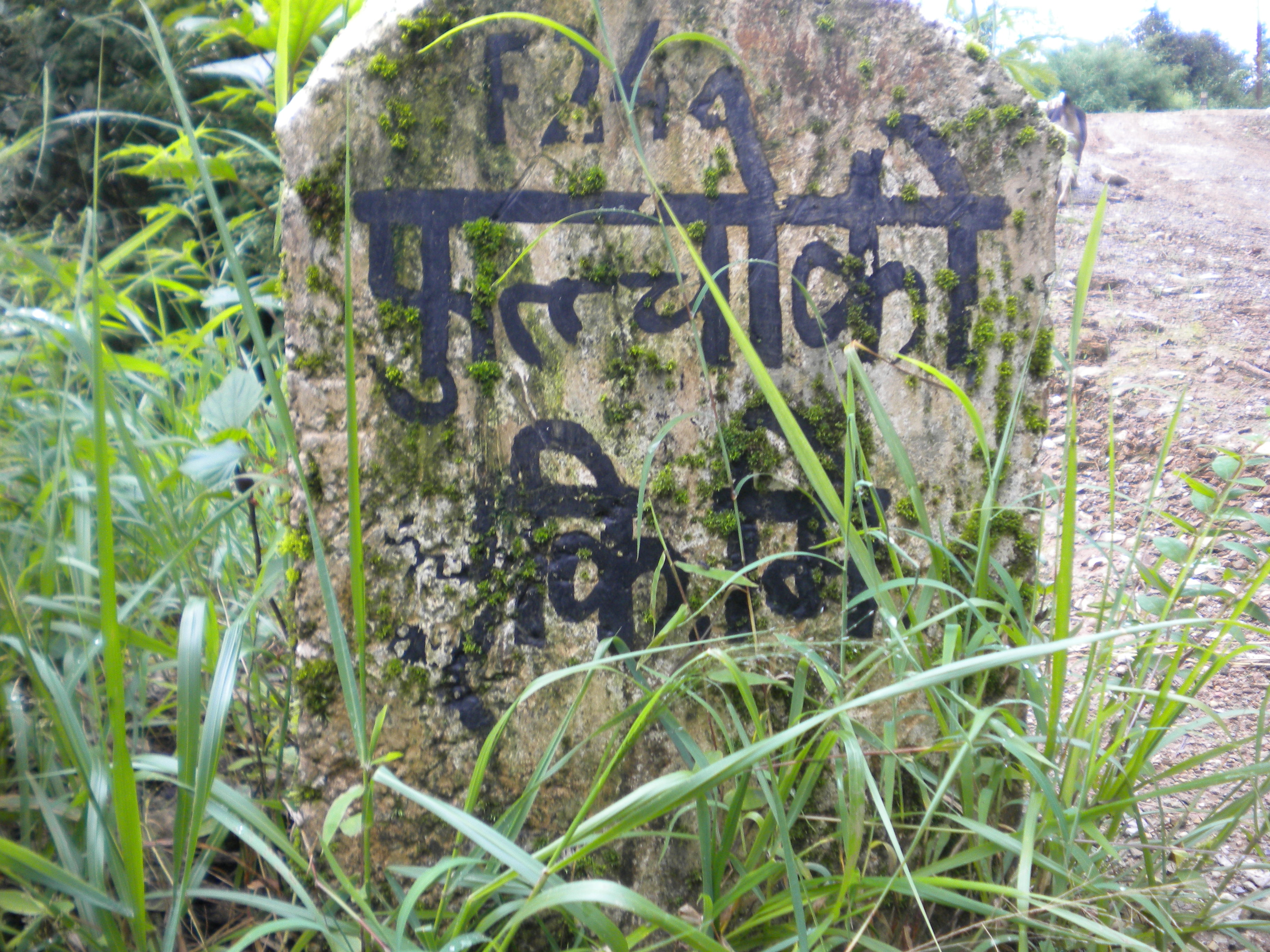
Phulchowki

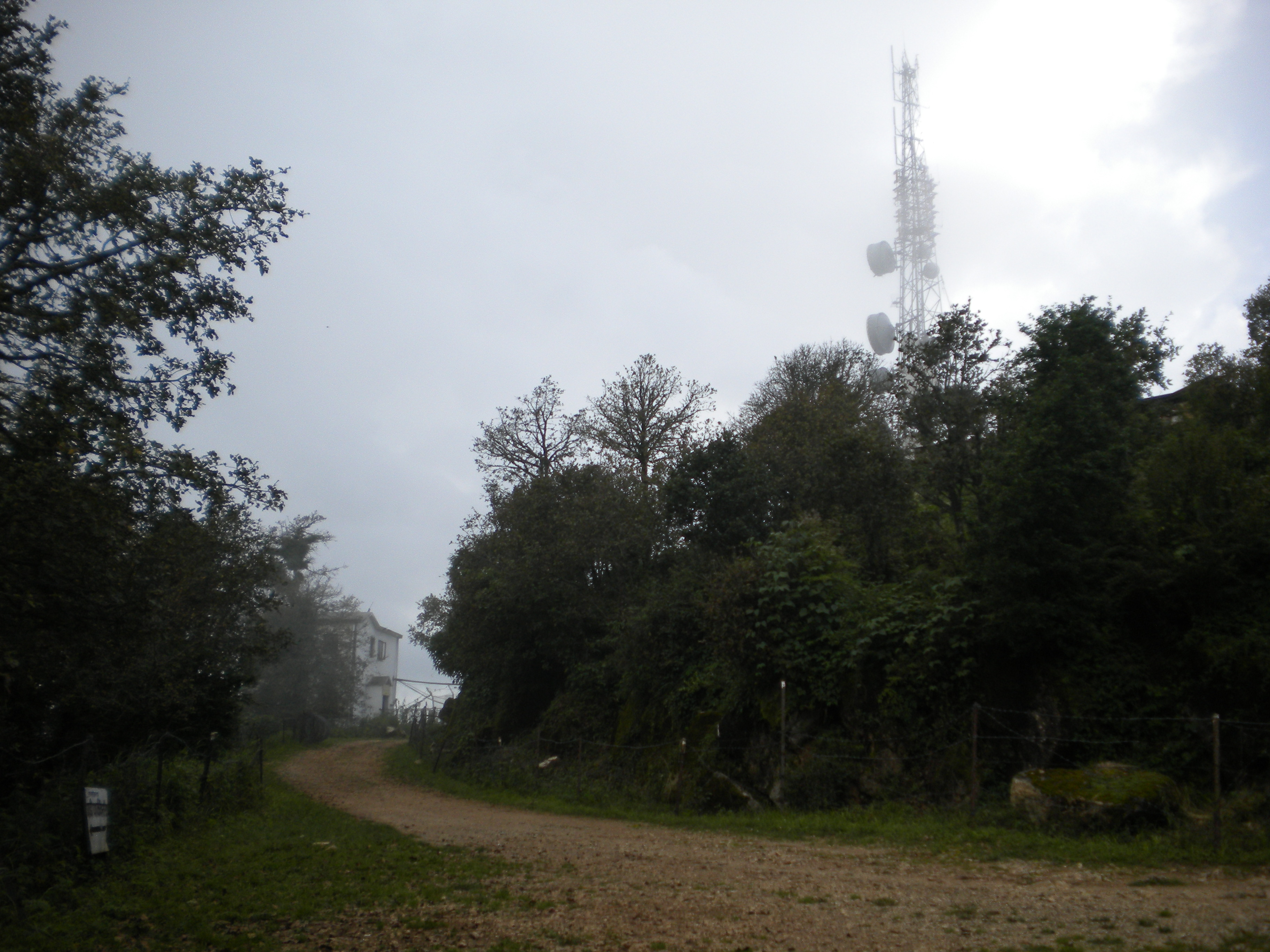
NTV tower Phulchowki
