= Barshitakli =

- city
- Location in Maharashtra, India
- Coordinates: 20.57°N 77.06°E
- Country: India
- State: Maharashtra
- District: Akola

Government
  - Type: Nagar Panchayat
- Elevation: 310 m (1,020 ft)

Population (2011)
  - Total: 30,214

Languages
  - Official: Hindi, Marathi
- Time zone: UTC+5:30 (IST)
- Telephone code: 07255
- Vehicle registration: MH-30

Barshitakli is a city and a tehsil in Akola district in the Indian state of Maharashtra.

== Etymology ==
The town was originally known as Tekkali. The "Barshi" prefix is believed to have come from the town's market (peth) being founded on a "baras" day (the day following Ekadashi). Another local version suggests "Barves Takli," referring to twelve gates ("ves") surrounding the village. The "Takli" part is said to be derived from a ruler named Tankakali.

== History ==
Barshi Takli, often referred to as Barshitakli, is a town in the Akola district of Maharashtra, India, known for its historical significance, particularly its ancient temples and the remnants of a fort or historical gateways. While it might not have a grand, well-preserved fort like some other places in Maharashtra, it holds importance due to its past as a capital and the structures that still exist.

=== Yadava Connection ===
It served as the capital of a collateral branch of the Yadavas of Devagiri. A rather damaged stone inscription from the Shaka year 1098 (corresponding to April 7, 1177 AD) found here mentions that during the reign of King Hemadrideva of this family, his minister Gamiyaya built a Vishnu temple, a deep tank, and a well at Tekkali.

=== Mughal Period ===
Barshi Takli was later the headquarter of a pargana (an administrative division) of fifty-two and a half villages during the Mughal era. An inscription in a tomb indicates that a local talukdar, Sulaiman Khan, built a mosque, a tomb, and a well in the area.

=== Calamities ===
The town suffered greatly from a Pendhari raid, a major fire, and a terrible famine (possibly in 1803), which significantly reduced its population.

== Historical Places ==
=== Fort/Gates ===
While a complete fort structure might not be evident, there are historical gateways (ves) and remnants of a fort, including bastions and walls, near the Kalanka Mata Temple in the town. These are the "historical gateways and fort" that locals refer to.

=== Hemadpanthi Temples ===
Barshi Takli is particularly famous for its two Hemadpanthi temples, constructed in the 12th century:

=== Kholeshwar Temple (Bhavani Temple) ===
This temple, dedicated to Goddess Bhavani, has ramparts that are described as resembling a Rajasthani fort. It features a star-shaped shrine with intricate carvings, mostly of female figures, except for Ganpati. An inscription inside the temple (dated 1176 CE) details its construction.

=== Vishnu Temple ===
The other Hemadpanthi temple, also from the 12th century, is dedicated to Lord Vishnu and is said to contain seven beautiful idols carved from a single rock.

=== Kazi Mahal ===
This is another significant structure in Barshi Takli, known for its ancient Mughal architecture.

=== Well with Steps ===
A historical well with steps leading down to the water, believed to have been built by Sulaiman khan, also exists.

=== Significance ===
Barshi Takli holds historical and architectural significance due to its ancient temples and the remnants of its fortified past, offering insights into the regional history, particularly during the Yadava and Mughal periods. The Hemadpanthi temples are especially noteworthy for their architectural style and historical inscriptions.

== Transportation ==
=== Railway ===
Barshitakli is a railway station on Purna-Khandwa section of South Central Railway (SCR). It was in the Hyderabad division of SCR and now is in the Nanded division after bifurcation of the Hyderabad division. Barshitakli was connected to the broad gauge railway network in 2008 when tracks were extended from Purna to Akola.

== Geography ==
Barshitakli is located at 20.57°N 77.06°E. The town has an average elevation of 310 metres (1020 feet).

== Education ==
Barshitakli has following schools and colleges

1) Babasaheb Dhabekar secondary and higher secondary school.

2) Gulam Nabi Azad college Of Arts, Science and Commerce.

3) Savitribai Phule secondary and higher secondary school.

4) jamat-e-Islami Hind, Barsitakli.

5) Madarsa e Misbahul Uloom, Barsitakli (Near Gulam Nabi Azad College)

6) Z.P.Marathi Boys school.

7) Z.P.Marathi Girls School.

8) Z.P.Urdu Boys school.

9) Z.P.Urdu Girls School.

10)Alfalah Urdu Primary School Khadakpura.

11) Perfect English School, Barshitakli

== Villages in Barshitakali ==
Barshi Takli was the headquarter of a pargana (an administrative division) of fifty-two and a half villages during the Mughal era. Today nearly a hundred villages falls under Barshitakli Taluka

1. Ajani Bk. 2. Alanda (gram Mandal) 3. Barshitakali 4. Bhendgaon 5. Bhendi Sutrak 6. Bhendimahal 7. Bormali 8. Chelka 9. Chincholi Ru. 10. Chohogaon 11. Dagadparwa 12. Deodari 13. Dhaba 14. Dhakali 15. Dhanora 16. Donad Bk. 17. Donad Kh. 18. Ghota 19. Gorhwa 20. Hatola 21. Jalalabad 22. Jambhrun 23. Jambwabhu 24. Januna 25. Jmakeshwar 26. Kajaleshwar 27. Kanheri 28. Kasarkhed 29. Katkhed 30. Khambora 31. Kherda Bk. 32. Kherda Kh. 33. Khopadi 34. Kothali Bk. 35. Kothali Kh. 36. Lohgad 37. Mahagaon 38. Mahan 39. Mangul 40. Morgaon Kakad 41. Morhal 42. Mozari 43. Nibhara 44. Nihida 45. Nimbi Bk. 46. Nimbi Kh. 47. Parabhavani 48. Paranda 49. Pardi 50. Patkhed 51. Pimpalgaon Hande 52. Pimpalkhuta 53. Pimpgalgaon Ch. 54. Pinjar 55. Punoti Bk. 56. Punoti Kh. 57. Rahit 58. Rajanda 59. Rajankhed 60. Redwa 61. Rustamabad 62. Sahit 63. Sakharkheda 64. Sakharviwara 65. Sakani 66. Salpi 67. Sarao 68. Sarala (gram Mandal) 69. Sawarkhed 70. Shelu Bk. 71. Shindkhed 72. Songoti 73. Sukali 74. Tembhi 75. Titwa 76. Titwan 77. Tiwasa 78. Ujaleshwar 79. Umardari 80. Vizora 81. Wadgaon 82. Waghjali 83. Wastapur 84. Yeranda 85. Zodaga
