= Pandurang Fundkar =

Indian politician (1950– 2018)

Pandurang Pundalik Fundkar

Minister of Agriculture Government of Maharashtra
- In office 8 July 2016 – 31 May 2018
- Chief Minister: Devendra Fadnavis
- Preceded by: Eknath Khadse
- Succeeded by: Chandrakant Patil

Minister of Horticulture Government of Maharashtra
- In office 8 July 2016 – 31 May 2018
- Chief Minister: Devendra Fadnavis
- Succeeded by: Jaydattaji Kshirsagar

Leader of Opposition Maharashtra Legislative Council
- In office 11 April 2005 – 22 December 2011
- Chief Minister: Vilasrao Deshmukh; Ashok Chavan; Prithviraj Chavan
- Preceded by: Nitin Gadkari
- Succeeded by: Vinod Tawde

Member of Maharashtra Legislative Council
- In office (2002-2008), (2008-2014), (2014 – 2018)
- Constituency: elected by MLAs

Member of Parliament, Lok Sabha
- In office (1989-1991), (1991-1996), (1996 – 1998)
- Preceded by: Vairale Madhusudan
- Succeeded by: Prakash Ambedkar
- Constituency: Akola

Member of Maharashtra Legislative Assembly
- In office (1978-1080), (1980 – 1985)
- Preceded by: Manikrao Gawande
- Succeeded by: Manikrao Gawande
- Constituency: Khamgaon

Personal details
- Born: 21 August 1950 Narkhed, Nandura Taluka, Buldhana District
- Died: 31 May 2018 (aged 67) Breach Candy Hospital, Mumbai
- Cause of death: Heart attack
- Party: Bhartiya Janata Party
- Spouse: Sunita (m. 1979)
- Children: •Sagar Fundkar •Vasundhara Fundkar Chopade •Akash Pandurang Fundkar
- Education: Bachelor of Arts
- Alma mater: University of Nagpur

Pandurang Pundalik Fundkar (21 August 1950 – 31 May 2018), alias Bhausaheb Fundkar, was leader of opposition in Maharashtra Legislative Council in India. He was a leader of Bharatiya Janata Party.

He was a member of 9th Lok Sabha (1989-1991), 10th Lok Sabha (1991-1996) and 11th Lok Sabha from Akola from Maharashtra. He was also former president of State BJP. He was born in 1950 in Narkhed.

He was elected as member of Maharashtra Legislative Assembly from Khamgaon Assembly constituency in 1978 and 1980. On July 8, 2016, he was sworn in as a Cabinet Minister in Devendra Fadnavis government.

He died on 31 May 2018 in Breach Candy Hospital, Mumbai due to a massive heart attack.
