= Patur =

- Town
- Patur
- Nickname: Patur ShahBabu (after Shah Abdul Aziz urf Shah Babu, whose tomb is in the west of Patur)
- Location in Maharashtra, India
- Coordinates: 20.46°N 76.94°E
- Country: India
- State: Maharashtra
- District: Akola
- Elevation: 341 m (1,119 ft)

Population (2001)
  - Total: 20,531

Language
  - Official: Marathi
- Time zone: UTC+5:30 (IST)
- PIN: 444501
- Telephone code: 917254
- Vehicle registration: MH30
- Patur Is Most Important Festival Is The 14 एप्रिल डॉ.बाबासाहेब आंबेडकर जयंती मिरवणूक, दसरा महोत्सव ,कावड यात्रा महोत्सव, Ramzan Eid

Patur is a town and a municipal council in Akola district in the Indian state of Maharashtra.

== Geography ==
Patur is located at 20.45°N 76.93°E. It has an average elevation of 341 m (1,119 ft).

== Demographics ==
As of 2011 India census, the total population of Patur was 117,635 in this taluka, of whom 60,765 were male and 56,870 female. In 2019/2020 the estimated population was between 114,106 and 144,691. Literate people are 85,917; 47,978 were male and 37,939 female. Patur has an average literacy rate of 72%, higher than the national average of 59.5%: male literacy is 77%, and female literacy is 66%. In Patur, 15% of the population is under 6 years of age. Patur is Muslim -majority town with a population percentage of 55% ratio amongst all communities, according to 2011 census.

| Year | Male | Female | Total Population | Change | Religion (%) | | | | | | | |
| Year | Male | Female | Total Population | Change | Hindu | Muslim | Christian | Sikhs | Buddhist | Jain | Other religions and persuasions | Religion not stated |
|---|---|---|---|---|---|---|---|---|---|---|---|---|
| 2001 | 51359 | 48787 | 100146 | – | 71.546 | 8.036 | 0.043 | 0.013 | 19.995 | 0.313 | 0.012 | 0.043 |
| 2011 | 60765 | 56870 | 117635 | 0.175 | 70.432 | 9.195 | 0.158 | 0.033 | 19.618 | 0.250 | 0.008 | 0.305 |

== Politics ==
Patur Municipal council was established in 1957.

- President of the municipality is Sau. Prabha Bhimrao Kothalkar
- Vice President Of the municipality is Syed Mujahiduddin
- Taluka Pramukh,Vanchit Bahujan Aaghadi :- Shri Swapnil Surwade
- Patur Bharip Bahujan Mahasange President Shri :- Raju Bhau Borkar

== Education ==
Major educational institutions include:

- Tulsabai Kawal Vidyalaya and Jr. College of Arts/Science, MCVC (Including Technical School and Mother India convent). Established in 1914, completing 100 years in 2014.
- Dr. H. N. Sinha Jr. and Senior College (including B.A./B.Sc.)
- Vasantrao Naik High School and Jr. College
- Savitribai Phule High School and Jr. College
- Gramin Ayurved Mahavidyalaya (BAMS College)
- Government Industrial Training Institute
- Several government and private Marathi, Urdu and English primary schools
- Hemleen Computer Center Class (MS-CIT and Computer Typing Authorized Center) Patur J S Deokar 9421747116
- Easy Maths Classes, Abrar Colony
- Educational Computer Institute (MS-CIT Authorized Center) Patur Deepak Rakhonde Sir 9764748758
- Farhan Computer And Skill Development Center, near SB Hostel, Marhaba Colony
- Priya darshni indira gandhi Mahavidyalaya Patur Jr. College of Arts.
- Bhavana Public School, Khanapur Road,Patur
- Laxmibai deshpande Mahavidyalaya
- Nagar parishad school No.1
- Nagar parishad school No.2
- Kids Paradise public school
- Shah Babu Urdu High School and Jr. College of Arts/Science, Washim Road Patur. Established in 1957, completed 59 years.

== Historical places ==
- Vitthal Rakumai temple is one of the oldest places in the city. It has a square well made of black stone, each pillar 1m by 1m. Many people visit this place throughout year as it has huge cultural heritage.
- Khadkeshwar temple, located in the city center on the riverbank. It has huge importance during desshera.
- Renuka mata mandir: located on a hill in the north-west, believed built in the 16th century.

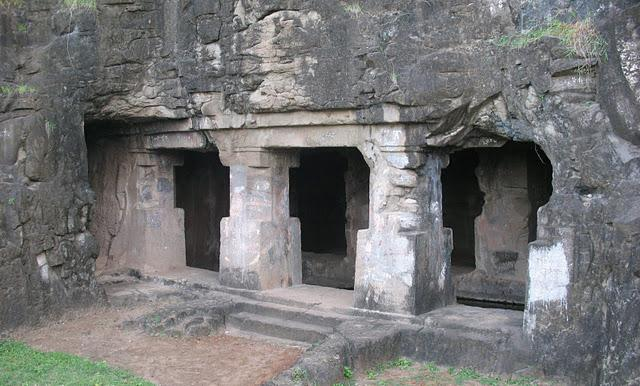
Patur Caves

- Patur Caves: Patur Caves near Patur-Balapur Highway, is a historic place built by Buddhist rulers in the 3rd century BCE.
- Buddhabhumi Shirla [Shraman Charitable Trust, Vippasana Meditation Center, Shirla
- Shahbabu Drgah on the west side of Patur, has historical importance in Maharashtra. Shahbabu was a 13th-century Muslim saint who came to Patna to preach Islam. Shahbabu was born in Mecca. The dargah was gradually built by many Muslim rulers. The tomb or holy shrine was built by Sultan Muhammad bin Tughluq of Delhi in 1348 AD, then second portion of Khangah and Sher Darwaza were built by Mughal Knight Abdur Raheem Khan-e-Khanaa. With latest development, Buland Darwaza (a copy of Ajmer Sharif Buland Darwaza) built by the late Haji Syed Akbar in 1950.
- Jama Masjid: Grand mosque of Patur, has of prime importance specially on Juma (Friday prayer. Built in 1726 AD by a nawab family of Patur. For the last 300 years it has been under the supervision of the Quazi family.
- Chaman Masjid : No historical records have bee found regarding the building of this mosque (Masjid), it was likely built during the reign of the Tughlaq Emperors. Uptill ran Alhumdulillah under the supervision of Haji Syed Talib and handed over to Badi Masjib Trust, Akola
- Masjid-e-Abrar: Masjid-e-Abrar is situated at Abrar colony near the Balapur road in Patur
