= Khamgaon =

- City
- Khamgaon
- Nicknames: Silver City, Cotton City
- Location in Maharashtra, India
- Coordinates: 20.7116°N 76.5661°E
- Country: India
- State: Maharashtra
- Region: Vidarbha
- District: Buldhana district

Government
  - Type: Mayor-Council
  - Body: Municipal Council, Khamgaon
  - Mayor/Administrator: Dr.Prashant Shelke (MUAS)
  - MLA: Aakash Fundkar

Area
  - Total: 87 km^{2} (34 sq mi)
- Elevation: 323 m (1,060 ft)

Population (2021 census)increasing
  - Total: 364,541
  - Density: 4,200/km^{2} (11,000/sq mi)
- Demonym: Khamgaonkar

Language
  - Official: Marathi
- Time zone: UTC+5:30 (IST)
- Postal Code: 444303
- STD Code: 07263
- Vehicle registration: MH 56, earlier MH 28
- Website: "Official website".

Khamgaon is a city in Buldhana district, Maharashtra, India. It is the largest city in the Buldhana district. It is well connected to all other big cities of Maharashtra and India through National Highway 53 and other state highways.

Khamgaon is known for being one of the hottest cities in Maharashtra, with temperatures often hitting 47–48 degrees Celsius during summer. Also, the rainfall is pretty low in the region, which has led to water scarcity many times in the city over the past.

Khamgaon is often called "Silver City" because it has a renowned silver market, with pure forms of silver products available. Amitabh Bachchan had ordered a silver statue of Ganesh from Khamgaon. Along with silver, there is a vibrant gold market and a number of goldsmiths in the city. It has previously been known as "Cotton City" when it was a major trade center for cotton during the British Raj. The city is a major silver and cotton textile production center. After 1960, Maharashtra Industrial Development Corporation (MIDC) began acquiring land and setting up industrial estates surrounding the city, which were quickly purchased by MNC's. Major industries in Khamgaon are FMCG, manufacturing, biotechnology, pharmaceuticals, and automobiles.

== History ==
Khamgaon used to be a major cotton hub during the British Raj and has many old buildings from the British era. Mahatma Gandhi stayed here for a brief time during Indian independence movement. They inaugurated Tilak Rashriya Vidyapeeth in the city. Anjuman High School and Junior College, and GS College of Science, Arts, and Commerce. Khamgaon was a center for Swadeshi movement after Kolkata. There are many historical and religious places around the city. Sant Gajanan Maharaj Shegaon, a holy place for Hindus, is located about 17 km (11 mi) northeast of Khamgaon in Shegaon.

The cotton trade at Khamgaon dates from about the year 1820, when a few merchants opened shops and began to trade in ghee, raw thread, and a little cotton. The place is said to owe its start in commercial life to the good management of one Jetal Khan, a revenue collector, who invited and encouraged traders. But the settlement of capitalists here is ascribed to a characteristic accident. The great camps of Pendharis were followed by many merchants and brokers who made big gains by buying up the booty. In 1818, Colonel Doveton broke up a large horde of Pendharis at a village close to Khamgaon. They were forced to disband and scatter, so the honest prize agents of this camp settled at Khamgaon, and their descendants became virtuous dealers of cotton in particular and other merchandise in general.

The general appearance of the town is picturesque. It is surrounded by low, irregular hills, while in the hollow, in and about the town, trees are plentiful. Besides the courts of the Assistant and the Additional Sessions Judge and those of the Civil Judge (Senior Division) and Civil Judge (Junior Division), there are the offices of the Sub Divisional Office, Tehsildar, and Panchayat samiti. There is also a post and telegraph office. There are two hospitals in the town, one managed by the Government and the other managed by a private institution aided by the Government. The educational facilities are provided by a number of primary schools and by seven high schools, viz., the Government Multipurpose High School, the Municipal High School, the New Era High School, the National High School, the Kela High School, the Anjuman High School, and the Government Girls' School. The G. S. College also provides facilities for higher education. There are two police stations. The municipal office was situated in a club building many years ago. It has now been shifted to its new premises.

The town proper is split into two by a large nallah, which runs from east to west. To cross it, there is a large bridge on the Chikhli Road, as well as a large causeway in the heart of the town, which has grown on all sides. There was a large fort, a gadhi, which is no longer in existence. Near the place where the gadhi was located, there is a large vesa or gateway which clearly belonged to the fortifications of the former village. The major squares of the city are Mastan Chowk, Farshi Chowk, Mahavir Chowk, etc. There is a temple of Hanuman, which is possibly of some antiquity, a handsome temple of Balaji, two fine Jain temples, a few lesser temples, and four small mosques. The Mukteshvara Ashram is conducted by the Bharatiya Samartha Dharma Rashtra Dharma Pracharak Mission, which has a few branches in Mumbai and some other places in the State.

== Economy ==
Khamgaon is a major economic hub in the Vidarbha region, distinguished by its robust trade, strategic location, and historical commercial importance.

It is home to an MIDC industrial estate, which significantly contributes to its economic vitality. The Khamgaon MIDC, established to promote industrial growth in the region, provides infrastructure such as land, roads, water supply, and drainage facilities to support businesses.

City is widely recognized as the “Silver City” due to its thriving silver and gold markets, which see significant activity. The city is a prominent center for the trade of precious metals, attracting buyers and sellers from across Maharashtra and beyond.

In 1870. The town was said to be the largest cotton mart in India. However, it is no longer the case, though the town still has a considerable trade in cotton. There are 22 ginning and pressing factories in the town. Khamgaon hosts one of the largest cotton markets in the state, serving as a critical hub for cotton and oilseed trade. Its agricultural markets facilitate the exchange of crops such as cotton, soybeans, and pulses. The weekly market is held on Thursdays and is very largely attended during the busy season. It also has acattle market. A regulated market is also established in the town. The city’s bustling bazaars and wholesale markets further solidify its role as a commercial powerhouse in Vidarbha.

The city serves as a vital link between rural agricultural areas and larger urban markets, facilitating trade and commerce across the region. The presence of well-developed transportation infrastructure supports industries, warehouses, and distribution networks, making the city a key player in regional supply chains.

== Festivals ==
Khamgaon is known for its cultural heritage and celebrates a variety of festivals that reflect its traditions.

The city celebrates a diverse array of festivals that reflect its rich Hindu, Muslim, Jain, and Sindhi traditions, fostering communal harmony. The prominent Ganesh Chaturthi in August or September sees around 30 mandals organizing grand processions with elaborately decorated Ganesha idols, music, and dance, culminating in idol immersions. Diwali, the festival of lights in October or November, boosts activity in Khamgaon’s silver and gold markets, earning it the title “Silver City.” Holi in March brings colorful celebrations with powders and water, while Cheti Chand marks the Sindhi New Year in March or April. The Muslim community observes Eid with prayers and feasts, alongside Baba Mastan Urs and Syed Thikri Shah Miya Urs at Mastan Chowk, honoring revered saints with qawwalis and gatherings. Vijayadashami in September or October features Ramlila and effigy burning on Ravan Tekdi located in the city, while Ambedkar Jayanti on April 14 and Shiv Jayanti on February 19 are marked by processions and cultural events. The Jain community celebrates Mahavir Jayanti in March or April with prayers and charity, and Hindu devotees undertake the Kanwar Yatra in July–August and celebrate Rama Navami in March or April with bhajans and rituals, collectively showcasing Khamgaon’s multicultural ethos.

The Shanti Utsav, also known as Mothi Devi Utsav, is a distinctive festival in Khamgaon with a history spanning over 110 years. Celebrated annually starting on Sharada Purnima (the full moon night in October), this 11-day festival is dedicated to Goddess Jagdamba. Devotees honor the deity to calm her “fierce” red visage, symbolizing her victory over demons and her protective blessings. Pilgrims from across India visit Khamgaon during this period to offer prayers and seek blessings. The festival includes traditional rituals, offerings distributed to the needy, and cultural events that strengthen community bonds. Its origins are tied to local devotees who popularized the worship of Mothi Devi in Khamgaon, making it a significant cultural and religious event.

Khamgaon’s festivals reflect its multicultural fabric, uniting Hindu, Muslim, Jain, and Sindhi communities in shared celebrations. The city’s proximity to the spiritual center of Shegaon, home to Sant Gajanan Maharaj’s temple, adds a layer of religious significance to its festive calendar.

The period from August to October is ideal for experiencing Khamgaon’s most vibrant festivals, such as Ganesh Utsav and Shanti Utsav, when the city is adorned with decorations and filled with cultural activities. The post-monsoon season offers pleasant weather, enhancing the festive atmosphere for visitors and locals alike.

== Climate ==
Khamgaon has experienced a hot semi-arid climate (Köppen classification: BSh), characterized by hot summers, a moderate monsoon season with significant rainfall, and mild, pleasant winters. The hottest month is May, with temperatures potentially reaching 42.2 °C. Khamgaon experiences a pronounced wet season from June to September, coinciding with the southwest monsoon, which brings the majority of the city’s annual rainfall. The wettest month is July, with an average precipitation of 212 mm (8.35 inches). while the coldest average is in January.

Climate data for Khamgaon (1981–2010, extremes 1908–2011)
Month	Jan	Feb	Mar	Apr	May	Jun	Jul	Aug	Sep	Oct	Nov	Dec	Year
Record high °C (°F)	36.0 (96.8)	40.0 (104.0)	46.0 (114.8)	47.0 (116.6)	48.0 (118.4)	48.0 (118.4)	39.0 (102.2)	36.0 (96.8)	37.0 (98.6)	36.0 (96.8)	37.0 (98.6)	35.0 (95.0)	48.0 (118.4)
Mean daily maximum °C (°F)	27.5 (81.5)	30.3 (86.5)	34.2 (93.6)	37.7 (99.9)	38.7 (101.7)	34.3 (93.7)	28.9 (84.0)	27.4 (81.3)	29.1 (84.4)	30.5 (86.9)	28.9 (84.0)	27.6 (81.7)	31.3 (88.3)
Mean daily minimum °C (°F)	14.7 (58.5)	16.8 (62.2)	20.6 (69.1)	24.5 (76.1)	25.3 (77.5)	23.3 (73.9)	21.7 (71.1)	20.8 (69.4)	21.2 (70.2)	20.0 (68.0)	17.1 (62.8)	14.6 (58.3)	20.0 (68.0)
Record low °C (°F)	5.0 (41.0)	4.4 (39.9)	11.2 (52.2)	15.9 (60.6)	15.1 (59.2)	17.5 (63.5)	14.2 (57.6)	16.4 (61.5)	15.0 (59.0)	13.4 (56.1)	11.0 (51.8)	5.9 (42.6)	4.4 (39.9)
Average rainfall mm (inches)	7.4 (0.29)	6.9 (0.27)	12.7 (0.50)	3.0 (0.12)	13.9 (0.55)	159.1 (6.26)	193.0 (7.60)	232.6 (9.16)	129.9 (5.11)	77.7 (3.06)	20.7 (0.81)	8.1 (0.32)	865.0 (34.06)
Average rainy days	0.5	0.6	0.9	0.5	1.2	7.5	11.8	11.9	7.4	3.4	1.3	0.5	47.5
Average relative humidity (%) (at 17:30 IST)	37	28	23	21	24	49	71	76	67	51	41	39	44
Source: India Meteorological Department

== Contribution in Chandrayaan 3 ==
Silver sterling tubes made in Khamgaon by the Chandrayaan-3 have leaped into space. In this campaign, the contribution made by the industries of Khamgaon has been highlighted. The conductive silver tube is manufactured at Shraddha Refinery in Khamgaon Industrial Estate (KIE). The contract to manufacture silver sterling tubes was awarded by ISRO on June 3, 2020, in Khamgaon.

The thermal shields from Vikamsi Fabrication from Khamgaon are also used in Chandrayaan-1, Chandrayaan-2, and Chandrayaan-3 missions. Vikamshi Foundation, headed by woman entrepreneur Geetika Vikamshi, supplied two products for ground testing and three for onboard flight to ISRO and has been associated with ISRO for the last two decades.

== Transport ==
Khamgaon is well connected by National Highway 53 (India) (NH 6) and Central Railway zone's Howrah–Nagpur–Mumbai line. The city is served by the Khamgaon railway station, which was built during the British Raj. A Khamgaon–Jalna Railway line was approved by the Ministry of Railways in 2016.

At Khamgaon Terminus railway station, which runs a local train between Khamgaon and Jalamb, there is a special direct train from Khamgaon to Pandharpur during Shayani Ekadashi. The nearest railway stations are Malkapur, Jalamb Junction, Shegaon, and Akola Junction, from which connections can be made to the broader rail network. Khamgaon Terminal has a single platform that goes to Jalamb Junction only. The city needs express connectivity, so Indian Railways has decided to halt some express trains at Jalamb Junction so people can travel accordingly. The city has a big market as well. The city imports and exports many goods. Freight trains depart from and arrive in the city daily.

== Demographics ==
As of the 2011 India census, Khamgaon had a population of 94,191. Males constituted 51.4% of the population and females 48.6%. Khamgaon had an average literacy rate of 92%, higher than the national average of 59.5%. Male literacy was 81%, and female literacy was 71%. 15% of the population was under 6 years of age. The main language spoken in Khamgaon is Marathi with hint of Varhadi dialect.

Year	Male	Female	Total Population	Change	Religion (%)							
Year	Male	Female	Total Population	Change	Hindu	Muslim	Christian	Sikhs	Buddhist	Jain	Other religions and persuasions	Religion not stated
2001	45933	42754	88687	-	68.152	22.028	0.355	0.520	6.827	2.022	0.056	0.039
2011	48368	45823	94191	0.062	65.135	24.814	0.323	0.475	7.360	1.810	0.014	0.070

View chart definition.

== See also ==
- Khamgaon Assembly constituency
- Buldhana district
- Khamgaon Lok Sabha constituency
- Pandurang Fundkar
- Chikhli, Maharashtra
- Buldhana
