= Akola district =

- District
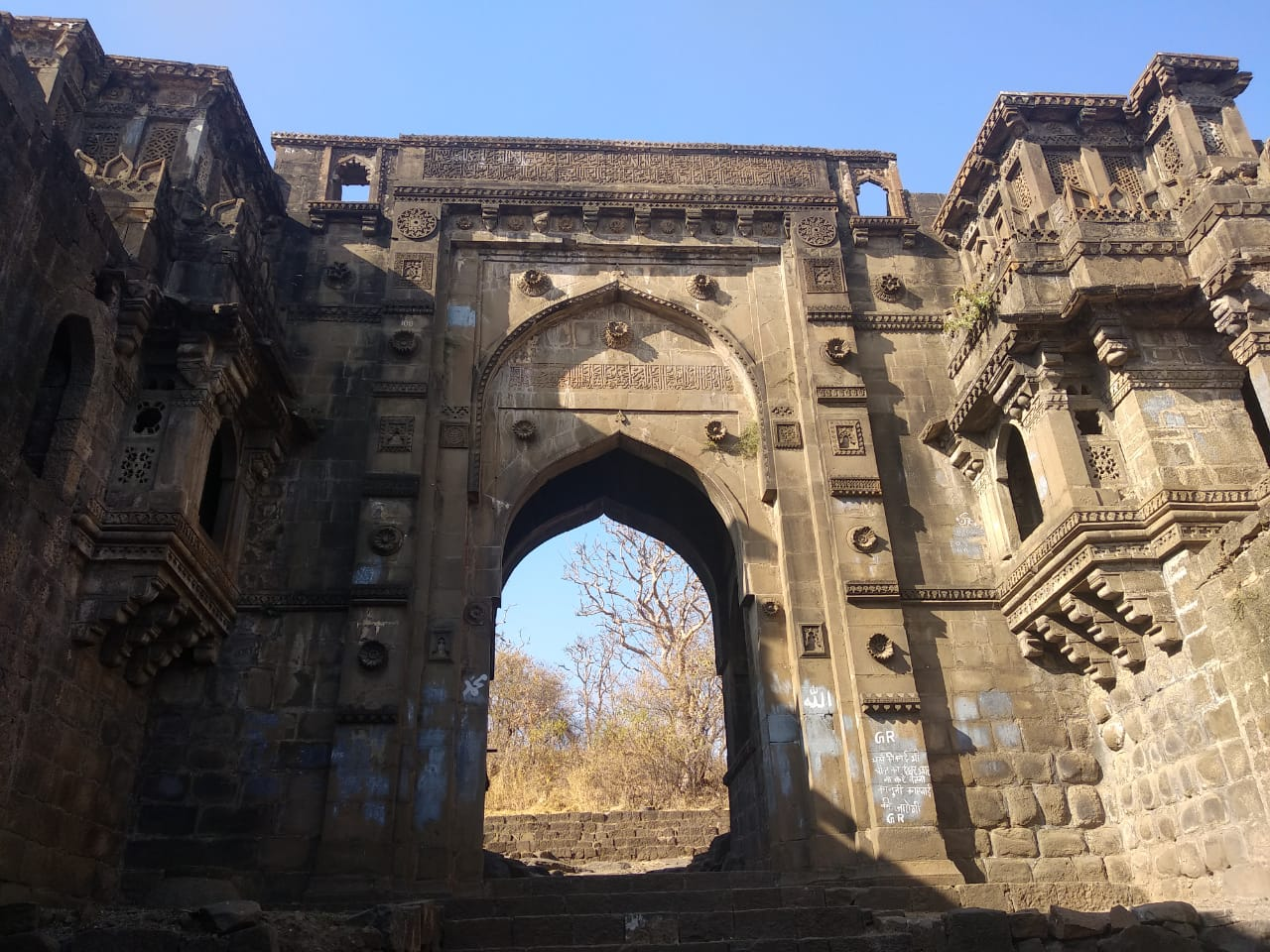
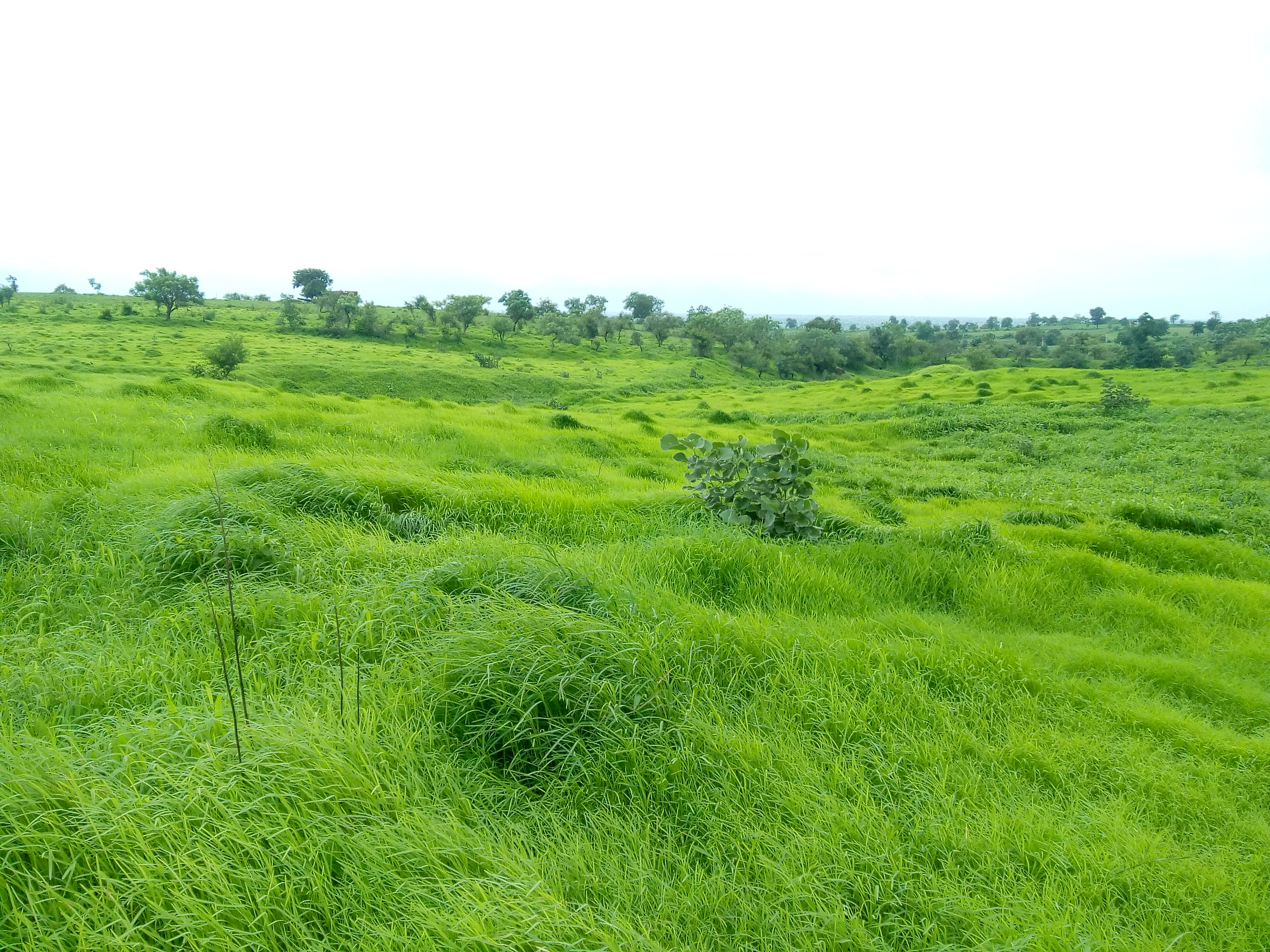
- Top: Narnala Fort, Akola; Bottom: Grassland near Akola
- Interactive map of Akola district
- Country: India
- State: Maharashtra
- Division: Amravati
- Headquarters: Akola
- Tehsils: 7

Government
  - Body: Akola Zilla Parishad
  - Guardian Minister: Radhakrishna Vikhe Patil; Cabinet Minister
  - President Zilla Parishad: President Mrs. Pratibhatai Bapurao Bhojane; Vice President Mrs. Savitribai Hirasingh Rathod
  - District Collector: Smt. Nima Arora (IAS)
  - CEO Zilla Parishad: Mr. Saurabh Katiyar (IAS)
  - MPs: Anup Sanjay Dhotre (Akola)

Area
  - Total: 5,428 km^{2} (2,096 sq mi)

Population (2011)
  - Total: 1,813,906
  - Density: 334.2/km^{2} (865.5/sq mi)
  - Urban: 44.04%

Demographics
  - Literacy: 88.05%
  - Sex ratio: 946
- Time zone: UTC+05:30 (IST)
- Vehicle registration: MH 30
- Major highways: AH-46, NH-53, NH-161, NH-161A, NH-161G, NH-161E, NH-361C, NH-548C, MSH-24, SH-197, SH-204, SH-200, SH-194, SH-195, SH-198, SH-199, SH-201, SH-212
- Average annual precipitation: 750 mm
- Website: akola.gov.in

Akola district (Marathi pronunciation: [əkolaː]) is a district in the Indian state of Maharashtra. The city of Akola is the district headquarters. Akola district forms the central part of Amravati Division, which was the former British Raj Berar Province.

Area of the district is 5,428 km^{2}. It is bounded on the north and east by Amravati District, to the south by Washim District, and to the west by Buldhana District. Washim was earlier a part of Akola till 1999. Akola district includes seven talukas which are Akola, Akot, Telhara, Balapur, Barshitakli, Murtijapur and Patur.

== Officer ==
=== Members of Parliament ===
- Anup Dhotre (BJP) - Akola

=== Guardian Minister ===
Guardian Minister Akola
- पालकमंत्री अकोला
- Emblem of India
- Incumbent; Radhakrishna Vikhe Patil; Cabinet Minister since 04 October 2023
- Style: The Honourable
- Residence: Mumbai Sagar Bangla
- Appointer: Chief Minister of Maharashtra
- Term length: 5 years / No time limit
- Website: akola.gov.in/en/

==== List of Guardian Minister ====
Name	Term of office
Dr. Ranjit Patil; Minister of State	2014-2019
Omprakash Babarao Kadu; Minister of State	9 January 2020 - 27 June 2022
Amit Deshmukh; Cabinet Minister; Additional charge	27 June 2022 - 29 June 2022
Devendra Fadnavis; Deputy Chief Minister	27 September 2022 - 4 October 2023
Radhakrishna Vikhe Patil; Cabinet Minister	4 October 2023 - Incumbent

|adv akash fundkar
Cabinet Minister |2024 - Incumbent |}

=== District Magistrate/Collector ===
District Magistrate / Collector Akola
- जिल्हाधिकारी तथा जिल्हदंडाधिकरी अकोला
- Emblem of India
- Incumbent; Smt. Varsha Mina (IAS) since 2025
- Residence: At Akola district
- Appointer: Government of Maharashtra
- Term length: No time limit
- Website: akola.gov.in/en/

==== list of District Magistrate / Collector ====
Name	Term of office
Smt. varsha meena (IAS)	2025 - Incumbent

== History ==
[The Battle of Argaon] Bk village is located in Telhara Tehsil, took place on 28 November 1803, between the British under the command of Governor Arthur Wellesley and the forces of Maratha under Bhonsle of Nagpur during Second Anglo-Maratha War.

Many old forts are located in Akola District viz.

- Narnala Fort
- Akola Fort
- Balapur Fort
- Vari Bhairavgad fort, Telhara Tehsil.

== Geography ==
Akola district lies in the northern plains of the Deccan Plateau. Akola district covers mostly plain topology with isolated hills and mounds except for the mountain ranges of Ajintha (Ajanta), located in the Southern tehsils of Patur and Barshi Takli, and the Satpuda mountain range that occupies some areas in the Northern tehsils of Akot and Telhara. The elevation profile of the district falls sharply as we proceed towards the central region from the North and then rises steadily as we head to the South from the centre. Highest point in the District is located within the premises of the hill-fort of Narnala measuring 932m above sea level.

=== Rivers and lakes ===
The Purna River forms the part of north boundary of the district, and the top north portion of the district lies within its watershed along with Aas River and Shahnur River. The Vaan River forms the part of northwest boundary of the district after entering from the Amravati district.

The Mun River drains the southwestern portion of the district, Morna River drains the midsouth portion of the district, while the southeast is drained by the Katepurna River and Uma River.

Here are some of the rivers in Akola, with their tributaries

- Uma River
- Katepurna River
- Shahanur River
- Morna River
- Mun River
- Mas River
- Utawali River
- Vishwamitri River
- Nirguna River
- Gandhari River
- Aas River
- Vaan River

=== Prominent persons ===
- Vijay P. Bhatkar, Architect of India's First Super Computer.
- Vasantrao Deshpande, legendary classical singer.
- Anand Modak, famous marathi music composer and musician.
- Patrick Barr, British TV and Film actor.

=== Climate ===
Akola district shows a little variation in its climate along the north–south direction. Akola district mainly features Tropical Savannah Climate. But the Northern parts of the district consisting of hills and mountains that are raised to about 950 to 1000 meters shows a subtropical climate featuring cool winters. The summers are extremely hot while the winters are dry and mild to cool as the temperature may drop to or below 2 °C. The district has recorded a minimum temperature of 2 °C while a maximum of 47.7 °C. Akola has recorded a minimum temperature of 11.9 °C in the month of May which is considered to be the hottest month in the state of Maharashtra.

Climate data for Akola
Month	Jan	Feb	Mar	Apr	May	Jun	Jul	Aug	Sep	Oct	Nov	Dec	Year
Mean daily maximum °C (°F)	29.9 (85.8)	33.2 (91.8)	37.2 (99.0)	40.7 (105.3)	46.7 (116.1)	37.4 (99.3)	32.0 (89.6)	30.5 (86.9)	32.1 (89.8)	38.8 (101.8)	31.5 (88.7)	29.4 (84.9)	34.2 (93.6)
Mean daily minimum °C (°F)	13.5 (56.3)	15.7 (60.3)	20.0 (68.0)	24.8 (76.6)	28.0 (82.4)	26.1 (79.0)	24.1 (75.4)	23.4 (74.1)	23.0 (73.4)	20.1 (68.2)	15.9 (60.6)	13.2 (55.8)	20.7 (69.3)
Average precipitation mm (inches)	7.8 (0.31)	4.5 (0.18)	11.0 (0.43)	5.1 (0.20)	6.6 (0.26)	146.3 (5.76)	210.7 (8.30)	199.7 (7.86)	122.0 (4.80)	45.4 (1.79)	19.5 (0.77)	14.2 (0.56)	792.8 (31.21)
Source: IMD

== Demographics ==
Historical population
Year	Pop.	±% p.a.
1901	444,653	—
1911	464,741	+0.44%
1921	469,947	+0.11%
1931	518,143	+0.98%
1941	536,696	+0.35%
1951	562,268	+0.47%
1961	716,333	+2.45%
1971	904,204	+2.36%
1981	1,118,267	+2.15%
1991	1,351,507	+1.91%
2001	1,629,633	+1.89%
2011	1,813,906	+1.08%

According to the 2011 census Akola district has a population of 1,813,906, roughly equal to the nation of Kosovo or the US state of Nebraska. This gives it a ranking of 262nd in India (out of a total of 640). The district has a population density of 321 inhabitants per square kilometre (830/sq mi). Its population growth rate over the decade 2001-2011 was 11.6%. Akola has a sex ratio of 942 females for every 1000 males, and a literacy rate of 88.05%. 39.68% of the population lives in urban areas. Scheduled Castes and Scheduled Tribes make up 20.07% and 5.53% of the population respectively.

=== Religion ===
Religions in Akola district (2011)
Religion	Percent
Hinduism	61.07%
Islam	19.70%
Buddhism	18.08%
Jainism	0.56%
Other or not stated	0.59%

Hindus are the majority religion. Muslims and Buddhists are both substantial minorities with nearly equal populations. Muslims are mainly urban while Buddhists are mainly rural.

Taluka Name	Hindu	Muslim	Buddhist	Jain	Other
Telhara	66.14	17.72	15.60	0.10	0.44
Akot	67.27	19.18	13.00	0.15	0.40
Balapur	50.45	26.46	21.70	0.31	1.08
Akola	58.51	21.32	18.50	1.01	0.66
Murtijapur	59.90	15.59	23.50	0.43	0.58
Patur	65.10	16.38	17.80	0.26	0.46
Barshitakli	68.34	14.20	16.80	0.32	0.34

=== Languages ===
Languages in Akola district (2011)
1. Marathi (70.4%)
2. Urdu (17.3%)
3. Hindi (6.30%)
4. Lambadi (2.04%)
5. Marwari (0.93%)
6. Others (3.01%)

At the time of the 2011 Census of India, 70.39% of the population in the district spoke Marathi, 17.33% Urdu, 6.30% Hindi, 2.04% Lambadi and 0.93% Marwari as their first language.

Varhadi dialect of Marathi is the main spoken language of Akola district. Deccani Urdu is popular among the Muslim community.

== Subdivisions ==
Akola District consists of talukas namely Akot, Telhara, Akola, Balapur, Patur, Barshitakli and Murtajapur.

== Transport ==
Important railway stations with their codes are Paras, Gaigaon, Akola Junction (AK), Murtijapur Junction (MZR) and are under Bhusawal-Badnera Section of Bhusawal Railway Division of Central Railway.

The other stations under meter gauge are Hiwarkhed, Adgaon Buzurg (ABZ), Akot (AKOT), Patsul (PTZ), Ugwe (UGWE), Akola Junction, Shivani Shivpur (SVW), Barshitakli (BSQ), Lohogad (LHD), Amna Vadi (AMW), Jaulka (JUK) are under Purna - Khandwa Section of South Central Railway.

The stations under narrow gauge are Lakhpuri, Murtajapur Junction, Karanja under two Narrow Gauge Branch lines viz Murtajapur-Achalpur and Murtajapur-Yavatmal of Bhusawal Railway Division of Central Railway.

== Economy ==
Akola district has a predominantly agriculture-based economy, with cotton, soybean, tur (pigeon pea), and jowar as major crops, reflecting its location in the Vidarbha region of Maharashtra. According to Economic Survey of Maharashtra 2023- 2024, the district's Gross District Domestic Product (GDDP) at current prices was estimated at US$5–6.6 billion in 2023–24. The services sector contributes the largest share to the district economy (49.2%), followed by industry (22.5%) and agriculture (17.4%). Industrial activity in the district includes cotton ginning and pressing, oil processing, and agro-based small and medium enterprises, while Akola city functions as an important regional center for trade, education and healthcare. While the nominal GDP per capita of the district being ₹1,97,334.

== See also ==
- Make In Maharashtra
