= Achalpur railway station =

Railway station in Maharashtra, India

Achalpur
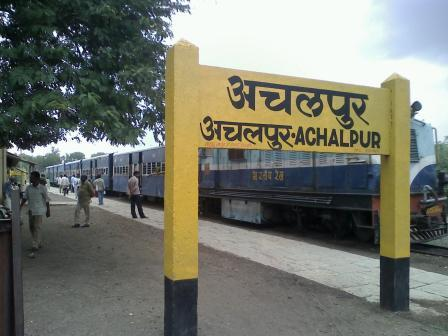

General information
- Other names: Elichpur
- Location: Achalpur, Amravati, Pincode 444806; Maharashtra; India
- Coordinates: 21°15′27″N 77°30′31″E
- Elevation: 388 metres (1,273 ft)
- System: Indian Railways
- Owner: Killick-Nixon
- Operator: Central Railway
- Platforms: 1
- Tracks: 1
- Bus routes: Achalpur-Murtajapur Junction NG line, Shakuntala Railway

Construction
- Parking: Yes
- Cycle facilities: Yes

Other information
- Status: Functioning
- Station code: ELP
- Fare zone: Bhusawal

History
- Opened: 1912
- Former names: Great Indian Peninsula Railway
Location
- Location within Maharashtra

Achalpur railway station serves Achalpur in Amravati district in the Indian state of Maharashtra. It is the terminal station on narrow-gauge Murtajapur Junction–Achalpur line of Shakuntala Railway.

The Shakuntala Railway is the only privately owned railway in India. The company, Killick-Nixon, originally British is now in Indian hands. The company operated a ZD steam engine on the run until 1994.
