= Jalamb =

Village in Maharashtra

Jalamb khamgaon Jalamb
- Village
- Nickname: Jalamb Jn.
- Location in Maharashtra, India Jalamb (India)
- Coordinates: 20.8166667°N 76.5833333°E
- Country: India
- State: Maharashtra
- District: Buldhana

Government
  - Body: Gram panchayat

Area 100 Acqur.
  - Total: 5 km^{2} (1.9 sq mi)

Population
  - Total: 13,000
  - Density: 2,600/km^{2} (6,700/sq mi)

Languages
  - Official: Marathi
- Time zone: UTC+5:30 (IST)
- Postal code: 444303
- Telephone code: 07265
- Vehicle registration: MH-28
- Nearest city: Khamgaon
- Literacy: 90%%
- Website: maharashtra.gov.in

Jalamb is a town in Shegaon tehsil of Buldhana district, Maharashtra.

== Transport ==
There is railway junction namely Jalamb Junction and is located between Nandura and Shegaon on Bhusawal–Badnera section of Bhusawal division of Central Railway. Jalamb connects Khamgaon town with main rail line through Jalamb Khamgaon RailBus.

== Politics ==
Jalamb had been one of seven seats from Buldhana district in the Maharashtra State legislative assembly comprising parts of Shegaon, Nandura, Jalgaon Jamod and Sangrampur tehsil of Buldhana district. It is now a part of newly formed Jalgaon Jamod Vidhan Sabha constituency.

== Description ==
The town post office Postal Index Number (PIN code) is 444308.

Nearby villages are Matargaon, Belura, Pahurjira, and Alasna.

Nearby towns are Nandura on West, Shegaon on East. The population of Jalamb is near about 8,000. There is a Temple of Shani Maharaj In Between Jalamb and Kherda.

== Train list ==
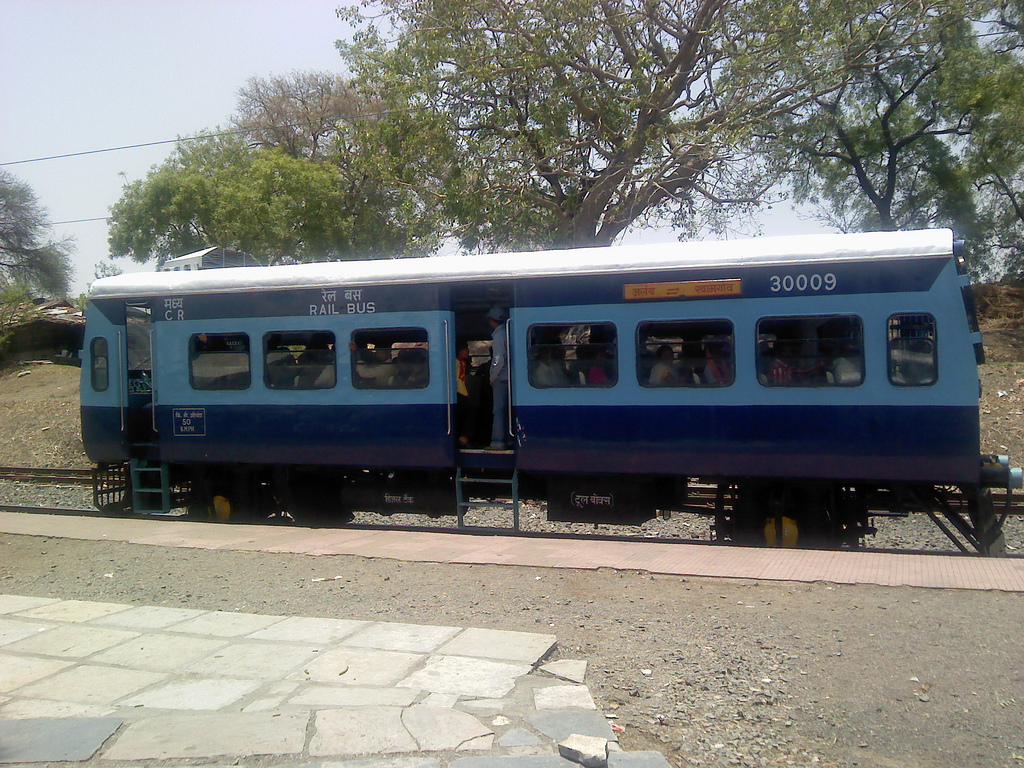
Jalamb–Khamgaon Railbus

The following trains halts at Jalamb Junction.

Up	Train Name	Dn
1040	Gondia–Kolhapur Maharashtra Express	1039
2140	Nagpur–Dadar Sewagram Express	2139
2810	Howrah Mumbai Mail	2809
2834	Howrah–Ahmedabad Superfast Express	2833
8030	Shalimar–Lokmanya Tilak Terminus Express	8029
JK1	Jalamb–Khamgaon Passenger	KJ2
JK3	Jalamb–Khamgaon Passenger	KJ4
JK5	Jalamb–Khamgaon Passenger	KJ6
JK7	Jalamb–Khamgaon Passenger	KJ8
JK9	Jalamb–Khamgaon Passenger	KJ10
JK11	Jalamb–Khamgaon Passenger	KJ12

.
