= Yavatmal Terminus =

Railway station in Maharashtra, India

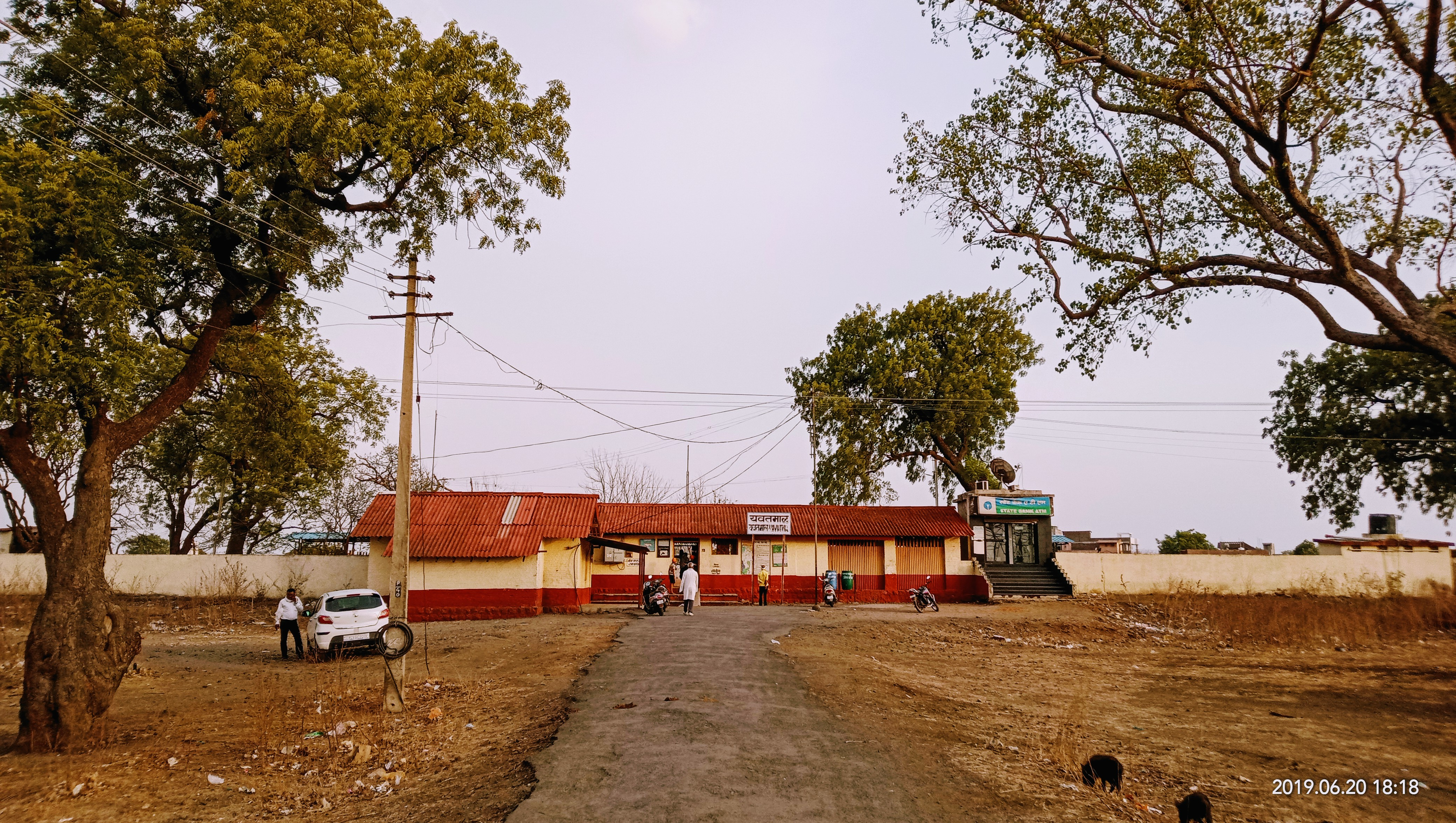
- Yavatmal railway station, 2019

General information
- Location: State Highway 212, Yavatmal, Maharashtra; India
- Coordinates: 20°23′15″N 78°07′11″E
- Elevation: 461 metres (1,512 ft)
- System: Indian Railway
- Owner: Indian Railways
- Operator: Central Railway
- Platforms: 2
- Tracks: 3

Construction
- Parking: Yes
- Cycle facilities: Yes

Other information
- Status: Functioning
- Station code: YTL
- Zone(s): Central Railway
- Division(s): Bhusawal

History
- Opened: 1912
- Former names: Great Indian Peninsula Railway
Location
- Location within India Location within Maharashtra

Yavatmal Terminus is a small railway station in Yavatmal district in the Indian state of Maharashtra. Its code is YTL. It serves Yavatmal city. The station consists of two platforms. The platforms are not well sheltered. The station lacks many facilities including water and sanitation.

Historic Shakuntala Express used to runs starts from this station.

Initial work on Yavatmal station started. It will be constructed behind Z.P school Arni road Yavatmal.

== Trains ==
- Yavatmal–Murtajapur NG Passenger (unreserved)

Currently no rail on this route.
