= Badnera =

- Neighbourhood
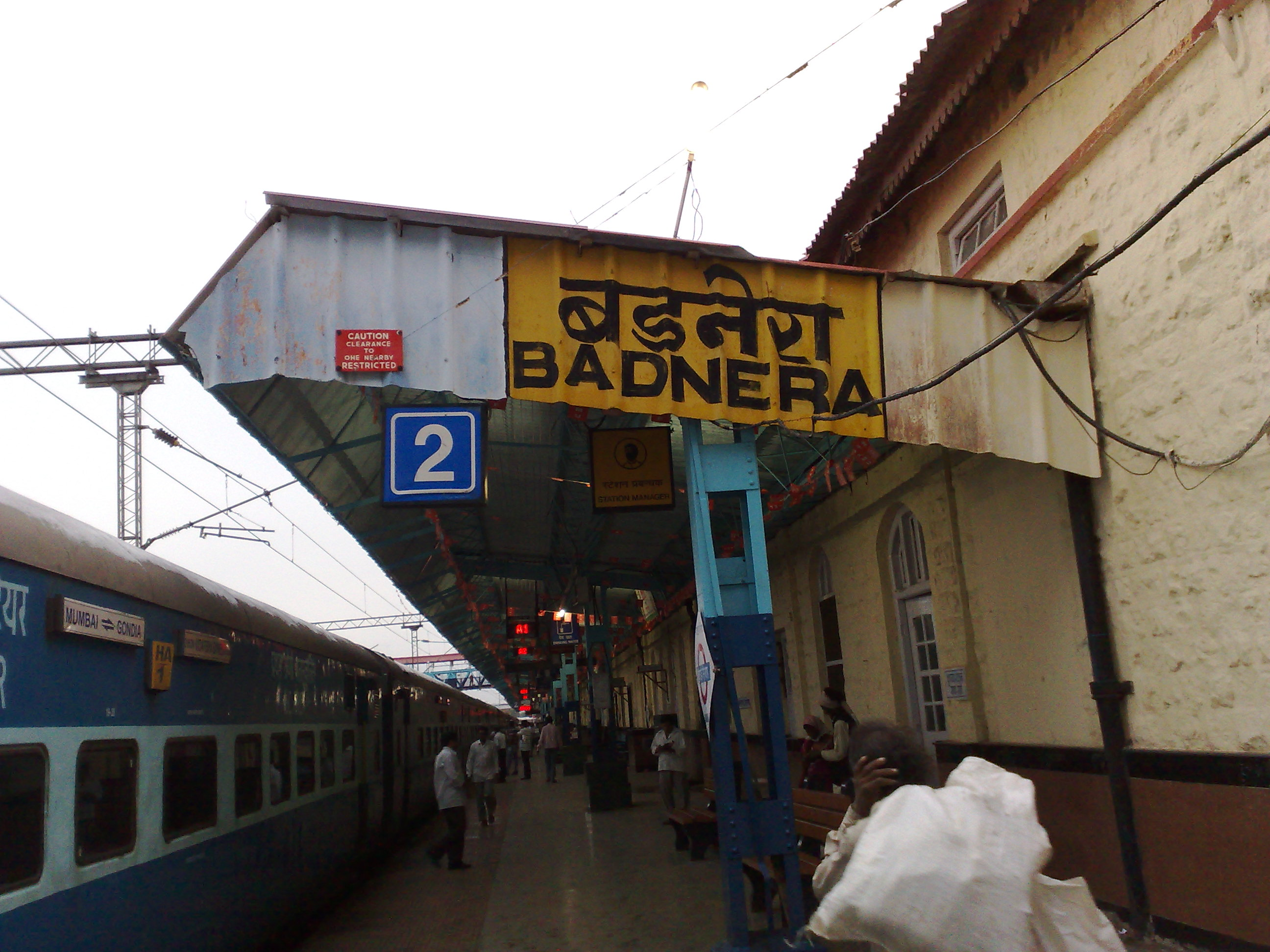
- Badnera Junction with 12105 Gondia Express

- Location in Maharashtra, India
- Coordinates: 20.854632°N 77.729312°E
- Country: India
- State: Maharashtra
- District: Amravati

Government
  - Type: Maharashtra State Government
  - Body: YSP
- Elevation: 500 m (1,600 ft)

Languages
  - Official: Marathi
- Time zone: UTC+5:30 (IST)
- Postal code: 444701
- Vehicle registration: MH-27

Badnera is a town in Amravati district in the Indian state of Maharashtra. Amravati city, an administrative headquarter of Amravati district is nearby badnera.

Railway

- Badnera Junction railway station is a junction station on the Howrah-Nagpur-Mumbai line. There is a broad gauge line to Narkhed.
  - Located around 10 km from Amravati, Badnera is an important railway junction that connects Amravati with several key locations.

== See also ==
- Amravati district
