= Deulgaon =

Deulgaon is a common name of town in state of Maharashtra. In Marathi language, Gaon literally means town.
Deulgaon may refer to:

- Deulgaon Awachar, Manwat taluka, Parbhani district.
- Deulgaon Bazar, Sillod taluka, Aurangabad district (Maharashtra).
- Deulgaon Dhudhate, Purna taluka, Parbhani district.
- Deulgaon Ghat, Ashti taluka, Beed district.
- Deulgaon Kaman, Bhokardan taluka, Jalna district.
- Deulgaon Kol, Sindkhed Raja taluka, Buldhana district.
- Deulgaon Kundpal, Lonar taluka, Buldhana district.
- Deulgaon Mahi, Deulgaon Raja taluka, Buldhana district.
- Deulgaon Raja, Buldhana district.
- Deulgaon Tad, Bhokardan taluka, Jalna district.
