= Motala, Buldhana =

Coordinates: 20°41′N 76°12′E

Motala
- Interactive map of Motala
- Country: India
- State: Maharashtra
- District: Buldhana

Population (2011)
  - Total: 10,331
- Time zone: UTC+5:30 (IST)
- Postal Index Number: 443103
- Area code: +91-07262
- Vehicle registration: MH-28

Motala is a township, or tehsil, in the Buldhana district in the Indian state of Maharashtra. One of its villages, Thal, is said to be the birthplace of Gajanan Maharaj. Motala market is a centre of economic activity, partially due to the good communication links between the villages. Villages in Motala taluka include Jaipur Korhala, kharbadi, Kothali, Dhamangaon Badhe, Rohinkhed, Shelapur, Takarkhed and Rajur.

== Irrigation ==
An earth-fill dam on the Nalganga River provides water for irrigation.

== Education ==
Motala has educational facilities from preschool to graduation level. Tertiary educational institutions include:

- Shri Shivaji Arts, Commerce & Science College, Motala
- Late Babanrao Deshpande School & Jr. College, Motala
- Jawahar Urdu High School & Jr. College, Motala
- The Motala Defence Academy

== Administration ==
Motala Nagarpanchayat is responsible for citizen services and some administrative matters in Motala city. It has an administrative as well as technical (engineering) wing for performing operational and developmental activities.

== Geography ==
Motala tehsil is a part of Malkapur, which is a sub-division of the Buldhana district, along with Nandura and Malkapur tehsils. Villages in the tehsil are Chinchpur, Kharbadi, Jaipur, Kothari, Taroda, Tighra, Advihir, Varud, Didola, Sholapur, Talani, Makodi, Pimpri Gawali, Dabhadi, Talked, Borakhedi, Vadgaon, Sarola Pir, Sarola, Maroti, Pophali, Dhonkhed, Parada, Chinchkhed Nath, Nalkund, Gulbheli, Shirva, Rohinkhed, Dhamangaon Badhe, Vaghjals, Shelgaon Bazar, Sawargaon Jahangir, Ava Yunus our, Liha bk, Talni, Jahagirpur, Makoli, Antri, Ubalkhed, Korhala Bazar and Pimpalgaon Devi.

== Climate ==
The average rainfall of this region is about 692 mm. The maximum temperature during summers is 48 °C. The minimum temperature during winters is 13 °C.
