= Dnyanganga Dam =

- Location within Maharashtra
- Official name: Dnyanganga Dam D01244
- Location: Khamgaon
- Coordinates: 20.5396486°N 76.4160168°E
- Opening date: 1971
- Owners: Government of Maharashtra, India

Dam and spillways
- Type of dam: Earthfill
- Impounds: Dnyanganga river
- Height: 35.73 m (117.2 ft)
- Length: 639 m (2,096 ft)
- Dam volume: 1,380 km^{3} (330 cu mi)

Reservoir
- Total capacity: 33,930 km^{3} (8,140 cu mi)
- Surface area: 4,151 km^{2} (1,603 sq mi)

Dnyanganga Dam, is an earthfill dam on Dnyanganga river near Khamgaon, Buldhana district in the state of Maharashtra in India.

== Specifications ==
The height of the dam above lowest foundation is 35.73 m (117.2 ft) while the length is 639 m (2,096 ft). The volume content is 1,380 km^{3} (330 cu mi) and gross storage capacity is 36,270.00 km^{3} (8,701.64 cu mi).

== Purpose ==
- Irrigation

== See also ==
- Dams in Maharashtra
- List of reservoirs and dams in India
- Dnyanganga Wildlife Sanctuary
