= Jaipur, Buldhana =

Coordinates: 20.682829°N 76.283390°E

Jaipur Jaipur (Kothali)
- Jaipur
- Interactive map of Jaipur
- Country: India
- State: Maharashtra
- District: Buldhana

Area
  - Total: 1,651 ha (4,080 acres)

Population (2011)
  - Total: 2,516
- Postal Index Number: 443103
- Area code: +91-07262

Jaipur is a village in Motala Taluka of Buldhana district, Amravati division, Maharashtra, India, in the Vidarbha. It is 21 km north of the district headquarters in Buldhana, 13 km from Motala.

== Demographics ==
According to the 2011 census, the village population is 2516, including 1260 males and 1256 females. Literate people make up 1922, including 1022 males and 900 females. Workers number 1284, of which men make up 746 and women 538. 592 Cultivators divide into 397 men and 195 women. 388 people work in agricultural land as laborers, 232 men and 156 women.

About 538 houses are found in Jaipur.

== History ==
Jai Singh I lived there for some time. The village was named Jaipur after Jai Singh I.

== Education ==
Jaipur has educational facilities from preschool to high school level. Tertiary educational institutions include:

- M.P.M. School, Jaipur
- Primary Urdu School, Jaipur
- Raje Chhatrapati High School, Jaipur

== Geography ==
Jaipur is surrounded by Buldhana Taluka to the south, and Nandura Taluka and Malkapur Taluka to the north. Malkapur, Nandura, Shegaon, and Bhusawal are nearby cities. Advihir (4 km), Fuli (5 km), Ibrahimpur (5 km), Kothali (6 km), and Takarkhed (6 km) are nearby villages.

== Notables ==
- An ancient Stepwell was built by Jai Singh I.

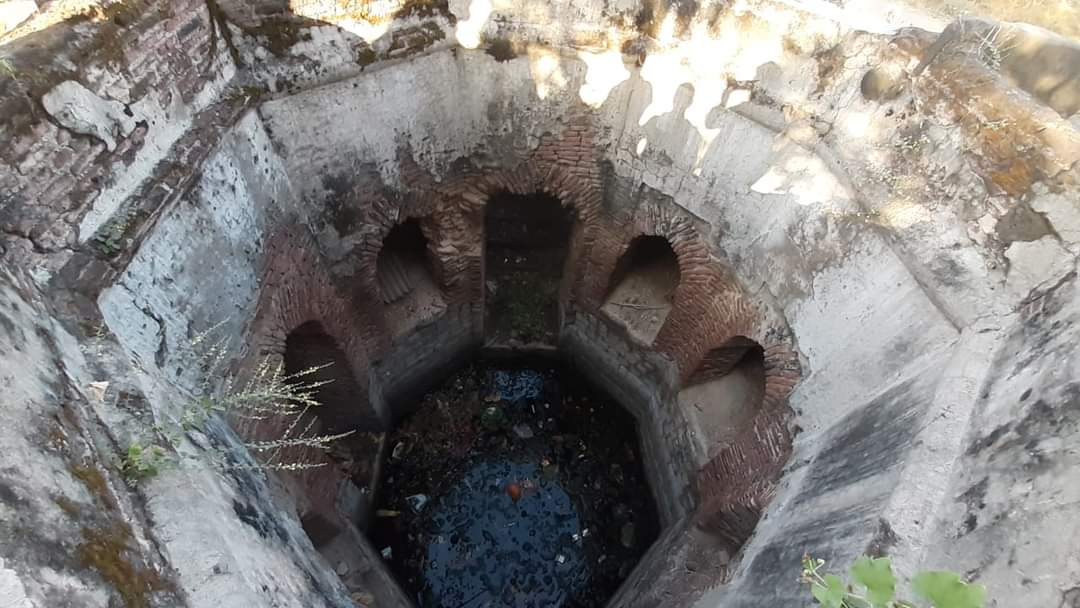
Ancient Stepwell, Jaipur

- Jaipur village is famous for Rewadi.

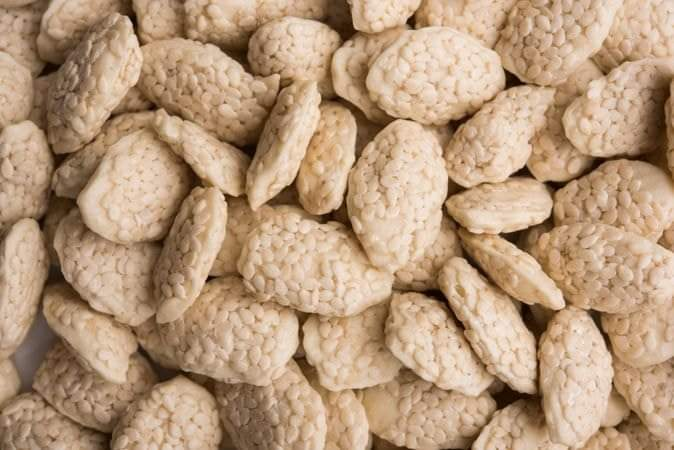
Jaipur Famous Rewadi

- Aa paduka of Shri Sant Gajanan Maharaj.
- The temple and the mosque are adjacent to each other in Jaipur.

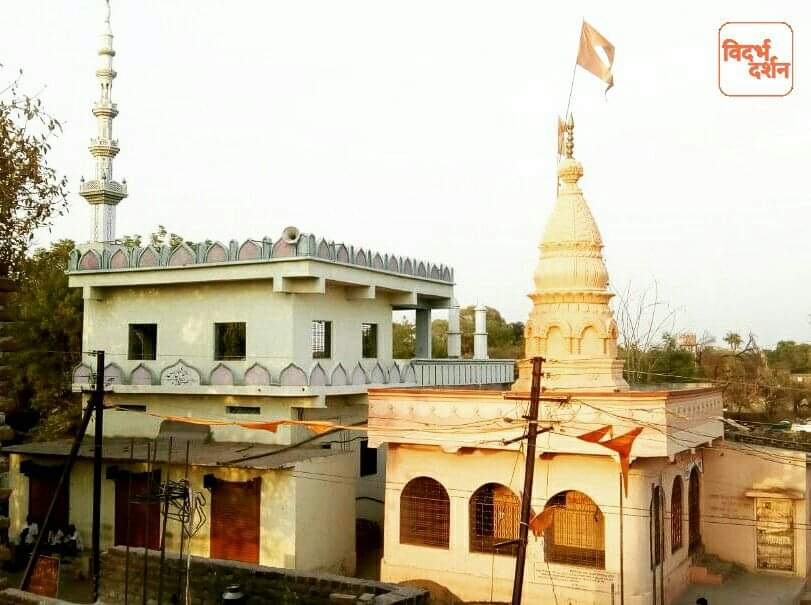
Village Jaipur, a symbol of Hindu-Muslim unity

== Climate ==
The average rainfall of this region is about 692 mm (27.2 in). The maximum summer temperature is 48 °C (118 °F). The minimum winter temperature is 13 °C (55 °F).
