= Chandol =

Chandol चांडोळ
- Village
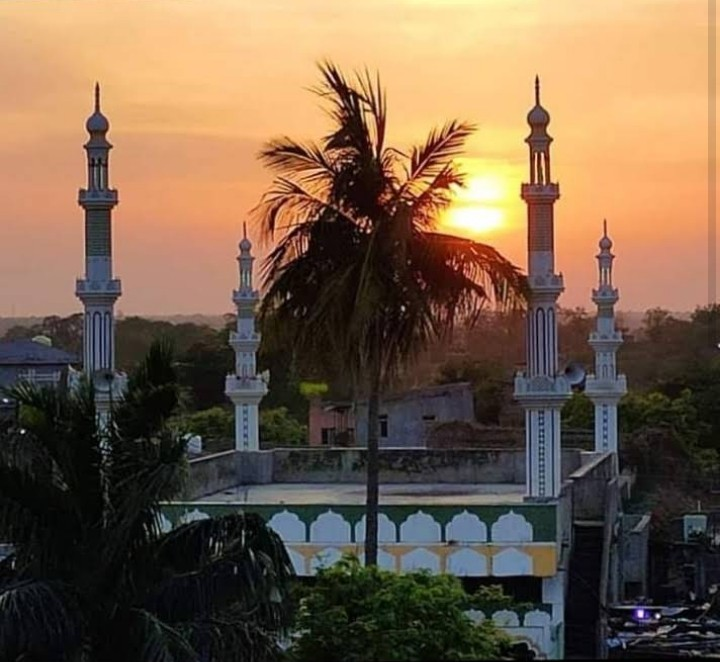
- Jama Masjid Chandol

- Location in Maharashtra, India
- Coordinates: 20.3304°N 76.0145°E
- Country: India
- State: Maharashtra
- District: Buldhana
- Taluka: Buldhana

Government
  - Type: Panchayati Raj (India)
  - Body: Gram panchayat
  - Sarpanch: Sunil Maher
  - Up-Sarpanch: Nirmalabai Deshmukh

Population (2011)
  - Total: 8,645

Language
  - Official: Marathi
- Time zone: UTC+5:30 (IST)
- PIN: 443106
- Telephone code: 07262
- Vehicle registration: MH-28
- Website: maharashtra.gov.in

Chandol is a village located in Buldhana tehsil of Buldhana district in Maharashtra, India. It is situated 35 km away from the Buldhana sub-district headquarter (tehsildar office) and 35 km away from the Buldhana district headquarter. As per 2009 stats, Chandol is the gram panchayat of the Chandol village.

The total geographical area of village is 2404.97 hectares. Chandol has a total population of 8,645 peoples, out of which male population is 4,411 while female population is 4,234. The literacy rate of Chandol is 64.64% out of which 73.00% males and 55.93% females are literate. There are about 1,699 houses in Chandol.

When it comes to administration, Chandol village is administrated by a sarpanch who is elected representative of the village by the local elections. As per 2019 stats, Chandol village comes under Chikhali Assembly constituency and Buldhana Lok Sabha constituency.

== Education ==
=== Shri Shivaji High School Chandol ===
Established in 1971, Shri Shivaji High School Chandol is located in a rural area of Maharashtra. In Chandol area of Buldhana tehsil of Buldhana district. Shri Shivaji High School provides upper primary, secondary and higher secondary (Grades 6–12) levels of education and is managed by a private aided organisation.

=== Sharad Pawar Urdu High & Jr College Chandol ===
Established in 2006, Sharad Pawar Urdu High & Jr College Chandol is also located in the Buldhana block of Chandol's Buldhana district in Maharashtra. This school provides secondary and higher secondary (Grades 9–12) levels of education and is managed by a private unaided organisation. The main language of instruction is Urdu language and the school is co-educational. The school is affiliated with State Board for both secondary and high secondary level.

=== ZP Urdu Upper Primary School Chandol ===
ZP Urdu Upper Primary School is located in the Chandol area of Buldhana block of Buldhana district in Maharashtra.

== Banks ==
The village is serviced by branches of the Bank of Maharashtra, Buldana Urban Bank and Chikhali Urban Bank.
