= Pandharinath Sitaramji Patil =

Indian social reformer

Pandharinath Sitaramji Patil MP

Member of Parliament, Rajya Sabha
- In office 3 April 1962 – 2 April 1968
- In office 3 April 1968 – 2 April 1974

Personal details
- Born: 20 September 1903 Amboda, Buldhana district, Maharashtra
- Died: 2 October 1978
- Party: Indian National Congress
- Spouse: Saraswati
- Occupation: Politician, social reformer, biographer

Pandharinath Sitaramji Patil (1903–1978) was an Indian social reformer, politician, and activist of the non-Brahmin movement. He was one of the earliest biographer of Jyotirao Phule.

== Early life ==
Patil was born to Radhabai and Sitaram Raut on 20 September 1903 at Amboda village in Buldhana district of Berar Province (now in Maharashtra). He had his primary education in Marathi in vernacular schools at Pimpri Adhao and Chandur Biswa. According to traditions of those days, he was married at a young age of nine with Saraswati (née Junare) in 1912.

He further had his English education at Pimpalgaon Kale during the years 1917–1919.

== Social work ==
Patil was an active member of non-Brahmin movement in the Buldhana district and was greatly inspired by the work of Jyotirao Phule. He started many schools at various places in the district like Jambhuldhaba, Kinhola, Deulgaon Mahi, Mera, Chandol, etc. He also founded a hostel named after Chokhamela. He successfully arranged a session of Satyashodhak Samaj at Amravati in 1925.

== Political career ==
Patil started his political career along with his work in non-Brahman movement. Following the Government of India Act 1935, when elections were held in 1937, he ran the elections as a candidate of non-Brahmin party and won the election against a candidate of Indian National Congress. He joined the Congress around the Quit India Movement of 1942. He was a member of Central Provinces and Berar assembly from 1937 to 1952.

After Independence of India, Patil was mostly involved in work in education and agriculture sector. He also took part in Samyukta Maharashtra Samiti in the 1950s.

Patil was elected to the upper house of Parliament of India, Rajya Sabha, in 1962 and was a member for two terms till 1974.

He died on 2 October 1978.
