= Amba Barwa Wildlife Sanctuary =

Wildlife sanctuary in India

- IUCN category IV (habitat/species management area)
- Location within Maharashtra Location within India
- Interactive map of Amba Barwa Wildlife Sanctuary
- Location: Buldhana district, Maharashtra, India
- Nearest city: Buldhana
- Coordinates: 21°13′20.3″N 76°38′55.2″E
- Area: 127.110 km^{2} (49.077 sq mi)
- Established: 1997
- Governing body: Maharashtra State Forest Department

The Amba Barwa Wildlife Sanctuary is situated in Satpura Range of Buldhana District of Maharashtra. It is a part of the Melghat Tiger Reserve. The sanctuary area includes Reserved forest 102.10sqkm, Protected forest 22.62 Sq. km.and remaining land is private cultivation and Abadi lands from ex-forest villages of Ambabarwa, Chunkhadi and Rohinkhidki of Sangrampur Taluka of Buldhana District.

== Management ==
The Sanctuary is under the Chief Conservator of forest and Field Director, Melghat Tiger Reserve with headquarters at Amravati.

== Tourist places ==
The sanctuary is 65 km from Shegaon. The tourist zone of the sanctuary is 21.26 Sq. km comprising eight forest compartments. The other tourist attraction are Mangri Mahadev Mandir, Jalkakund, Pipladohkhora, and Chimankhora.
