= Shweta Mahale =

Indian politician (born 1983)

Shweta Mahale Patil

Member of Maharashtra Legislative Assembly
- Incumbent
- Assumed office 24 October 2019
- Preceded by: Rahul Siddhvinayak Bondre
- Constituency: Chikhali

Personal details
- Born: March 27, 1983 (age 43) Lonar, Buldhana district
- Party: Bharatiya Janata Party
- Spouse: Vidyadhar Mahale
- Parent: Ankushrao Patil Padghan (Bappu)
- Education: Diploma in Pharmacy
- Occupation: Politician

Shweta Vidyadhar Mahale Patil (born 27 March 1983) is an Indian politician from Maharashtra. She represents the Chikhali Assembly constituency in the Maharashtra Legislative Assembly (MLA).

== Early life and education ==
Shweta Mahale was born in Lonar, Buldhana district. She completed her SSC in 1999 and later completed her Diploma in Pharmacy from Anuradha Pharmacy College Chikhli, Sant Gadge Baba Amravati University, Amravati in 2002. She married Vidhyadhar Mahale (the Personal assistant of Chief Minister of Maharashtra Devendra Fadnavis).

== Career ==
Shweta is a first-time member of the MLA. She won the 2019 Maharashtra Legislative Assembly Election from Chikhali Assembly Constituency defeating two-time MLA member Rahul Siddhvinayak Bondre of Indian National Congress by a margin of 6,810 votes.

In 2022, Mahale was honored with the Best MLA Award by Six Sigma Excellence.

In 2023, Mahale received the Lokmat Maharashtrian of the Year Award in 'Debutante Politician' category.

Shweta won the 2024 Maharashtra Legislative Assembly Election, defeating Indian National Congress candidate Rahul Siddhvinayak Bondre by a margin of 3201 votes.

Political offices
Preceded by Rahul Siddhvinayak Bondre	Member of the Maharashtra Legislative Assembly; 2019–2024	Succeeded by Self
Preceded by Self	Member of the Maharashtra Legislative Assembly; 2024–present	Succeeded by Vacant
