= Janephal =

Village in Maharashtra

- Village
- Location within Maharashtra
- Coordinates: 20°17′37″N 76°34′33″E
- Postal code: 443 304
- Area code: 07268

Janephal is a village in Buldhana District in the Indian state of Maharashtra. It is situated on Maharashtra State Highway 171 between Khamgaon and Mehkar. Janephal is known for its wide roads and central drainage system, which are rare in rural areas.

== History ==
Janephal appears in Marwadi history. The town existed before 400 B.C. Two original stone gates (Vesh) and one small fort (Gadhi) still exist in the village.

== Notable people ==
- Sadanand Deshmukh, author awarded the Sahitya Akademi Award in 2004.
