= Kanadi Budruk =

Village in Maharashtra

Coordinates: 18.7894°N 75.0105°E

Kanadi Budruk is a small village situated in the Ashti tehsil of the Beed district of Maharashtra. The population of the Kanadi Budruk is approximately 1800 as per latest census in 2011. The main occupation in the village is agriculture.

Pandurang Devastan in West Side of Village by Trustee Narendra Kulkarni Since Hereditary
