= Dhamangaon Badhe =

- Village
- Country: India
- State: Maharashtra
- District: Buldhana
- Taluka: Motala

Population (2011)
  - Total: 11,335

Dhamangaon Badhe is a town in Motala taluka of Buldhana district,It is located on the boundaries of the Buldhana, Jalgaon, and Aurangabad districts. Beauty of the city have masjid and mandir beside of each other.
