= Chinchpur =

Village in Maharashtra, India

Chinchpur is a village located in the Taluka of Motala, in Buldhana district, Maharashtra, India, with a total population of 1292.

According to the information of the 2011 Census, the location code or village code of Chinchpur village is 528732. It is situated 5 km away from the sub-district township of Motala and 25 km away from Buldhana. As per 2009 statistics, Sanglad is the gram panchayat of Chinchpur village.

The total area of the village is 614.41 hectares. There are about 281 houses in Chinchpur .
