= Dhad =

Dhad may refer to:

- Dihydroxy-acid dehydratase, an enzyme
- Dhad, Maharashtra, a village in Maharashtra, India
- Dhadd, an hourglass-shaped traditional musical instrument
- Raid (military), in Hindi language
- Ḍād, a letter of the Arabic alphabet
