= Isoli =

Village in Maharashtra, India

Isoli Esoli
- Village
- Nickname: Talukyachi rajkiya rajdhani
- Location in Maharashtra, India Isoli (India)
- Coordinates: 20.3526743°N 76.488553°E
- Country: India
- State: Maharashtra
- District: Buldana

Government
  - Type: Grampanchayat
  - Body: Congress
- Demonym: Isolikar

Languages
  - Official: Marathi
- Time zone: UTC+5:30 (IST)
- PIN: 444301
- Telephone code: 00-91-7264
- Vehicle registration: MH-28

Isoli is a village panchayat located in the Buldhana district, in the Chikhli Tehsil of Maharashtra, India. Mumbai is located 414.2 kilometer away from Isoli..

Nearby villages are: Karatwadi 9.9 km, Jamephal 11 km, Amdapur 8 km, Mahimal 11.7 km, Dasala 12.4 km, Peth 16.4 km, Kolara 21.6 km, Chikhli 24.9 km, Malgani 26.7 km, Hatni 26.9 km, Kelwad 29.5 km, Malshemba, Amona, Shelodi, Godri, Bharosa, Bramhapuri, Misalwadi.

== Demographics ==
The native language of Isoli is Marathi which is spoken by most village people. According to Census 2011 information the location code or village code of Isoli village is 529130. Isoli village is located in Chikhli Tehsil of Buldana district in Maharashtra, India. It is situated 32 km away from sub-district headquarter Chikhli and 55 km away from district headquarter Buldana. As per 2009 stats, Isoli village is also a gram panchayat.

The total geographical area of village is 1226 hectares. Isoli has a total population of 5,210 peoples. There are about 1,122 houses in Isoli village. As per 2019 stats, Isoli villages comes under Chikhli assembly & Buldhana parliamentary constituency. Chikhli is nearest town to Isoli which is approximately 32km away.

== Transportation ==
=== Railways ===
The nearest railway station to Isoli is Khamkhed which is located in and around 26.8 kilometer distance.

=== Airways ===
Isoli‘s nearest airport is Akola Airport situated at 70.6 km distance. Few more airports around Isoli are as follows. Akola Airport 70.6 km. Jalgaon Airport 112.5 km. Aurangabad Airport 126.3 km.

== Education ==
Some of the schools are:- Shri Shivaji Highschool Isoli 0 km . Shri Shivahi Highschool Janephal 11.0 km. Vivekanand School 13.0 km. Marathi Primary School Shelsur 17.5 km. Shivaji High School Shelsur 17.7 km. Z P Marathi School 18.7 km.
