= Deulgaon Kol =

Village in Maharashtra

Deulgaon Deulgaon Kol
- Village
- Location in Maharashtra Deulgaon (India)
- Country: India
- State: Maharashtra
- District: Buldhana

Government
  - Type: Grampanchayat
- Elevation: 502 m (1,647 ft)

Population (2011)
  - Total: 2,878

Languages
  - Official: Marathi
- Time zone: UTC+5:30 (IST)
- PIN: 443301
- Telephone code: 07269
- Vehicle registration: MH-28

Deulgaon, commonly known as Deulgaon Kol, is a village located in Sindkhed Raja taluka of Buldhana district, in state of Maharashtra, India.

== Demographics ==
According to the 2011 census:

- Deulgaon Kol has 638 families residing. The village has population of 2878.
- Out of the population of 2878, 1525 are males while 1353 are females.
- Literacy rate of the village is 77.51%.
- Average sex ratio of the village is 887 females to 1000 males. Average sex ratio of Maharashtra state is 929.

== Geography, and transport ==
Distance between Deulgaon Kol, and district headquarter Buldhana is 67 kilometres (42 mi).
