= Rohinkhed =

Village in Maharashtra

- Village
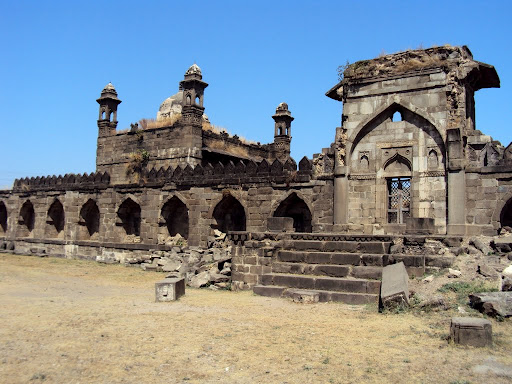
- The Jaama mosque at Rohinkhed

- Location within Maharashtra
- Coordinates: 20°37′47″N 76°07′46″E
- Country: India
- State: Maharashtra
- District: Buldhana

Population (2011)
  - Total: 7,849
- Postal code: 443101

Rohinkhed or Raunaqabad is a village in Buldhana district in the Indian state of Maharashtra. It is historically significant as the site of two battles, one in 1437 and another in 1590. The village contains a mosque, built by Khudawand Khan, the Mahdavi, in 1582.

The old name of this village is Raunaqabad. The Jaama mosque is designated by the Archaeological Survey of India as a cultural monument of national importance. The village is situated between the Nalganga and Utavli rivers.

== Battle of Rohinkhed 1437 ==
In 1437, Nasir Khan Faruqi, the Sultan of Khandesh, invaded Berar sultanate to avenge the ill-treatment of his daughter by Ala-ud-Din Bahman Shah, to whom she had been married. Khalaf Hasan Basri, the Governor of Daulatabad, was sent against the invader. He attacked Nasir Khan Faruqi at Rohinkhed, routed him, and pursued him to his capital, Burhanpur, which he sacked.

== Battle of Rohinkhed 1590 ==
In 1590, Burhan, the son of Hussain Nizam Shah I and brother of Murtaza Nizam Shah I of Ahmadnagar Sultanate, who had taken refuge at the court of Akbar, invaded Berar sultanate with Raja Ali Khan, a vassal ruler of Khandesh. Their aim was to establish his claim to the Ahmadnagar Sultanate against his son, Ismail Nizam Shah, who had been elevated to the throne by a faction led by Jamalkhan. The invaders met Jamalkhan's forces at Rohinkhed and utterly defeated them; Jamalkhan was slain, and young Ismail was captured at Rohinkhed.

A mosque was built at Rohinkhed in 1582 by Khudavand Khan Mahdavi, a follower of Jamalkhan. It is now in a dilapidated condition and bears an inscription of which only fragments are legible. The inscription records that the mosque was built in A.H. 990 (A.D. 1582) by Khudavand Khan, praising his generosity. It is said to be second only to Kabah at Mecca in sanctity.

The area surrounding Rohinkhed was once known as a hunting ground where various game birds and animals were found.
