= Borade =

Borade (Marathi: बोराडे) is a Marathi surname. Notable people with the surname include:

- Raosaheb Rangnath Borade (1940–2025), Indian Marathi-language novelist and dramatist
- Vanita Jagdeo Borade (born 1975), Indian conservationist and wildlife protection activist
