= Deulgaon Kundpal =

Village in Maharashtra

Deulgaon Deulgaon Kundpal Deulgaon Kund
- Village
- Location in Maharashtra Deulgaon (India)
- Coordinates: 19°57′0″N 76°29′0″E
- Country: India
- State: Maharashtra
- District: Buldhana

Government
  - Type: Grampanchayat
- Elevation: 454 m (1,490 ft)

Population (2011)
  - Total: 2,321

Languages
  - Official: Marathi
- Time zone: UTC+5:30 (IST)
- PIN: 443302
- Telephone code: 07260
- Vehicle registration: MH-28

Deulgaon, commonly known as "Deulgaon Kundpal" and sometimes as"Deulgaon Kund", is a village located in Lonar taluka of Buldhana district, in state of Maharashtra.

== Demographics ==
As per 2011 census:

- Deulgaon Kundpal has 474 families residing. The village has population of 2321.
- Out of the population of 2321, 1234 are males while 1087 are females.
- Literacy rate of the village is 76.09%.
- Average sex ratio of the village is 881 females to 1000 males. Average sex ratio of Maharashtra state is 929.

== Geography, and transport ==
Distance between Deulgaon Kundpal, and district headquarter Buldhana is 81 kilometres (50 mi).
