= Parodi, Beed =

Village in Maharashtra

Parodi
- Village
- Location in Maharashtra, India Parodi (India)
- Coordinates: 18°51′30″N 74°55′22″E
- Country: India
- State: Maharashtra
- District: Beed
- Taluka: Ashti

Languages
  - Official: Marathi
- Time zone: UTC+5:30 (IST)
- PIN: 414202
- Vidhan Sabha constituency: Ashti
- Climate: HOT (Köppen)

Parodi is a village in Ashti Taluka, Beed District, Aurangabad Division, Maharashtra, India.

== Demographics ==
In the 2001 census, the village of Parodi had 1,084 inhabitants, with 555 males (51.2%) and 529 females (48.8%), for a gender ratio of 953 females per thousand males.
