= Dhad, Maharashtra =

Dhad
- Village
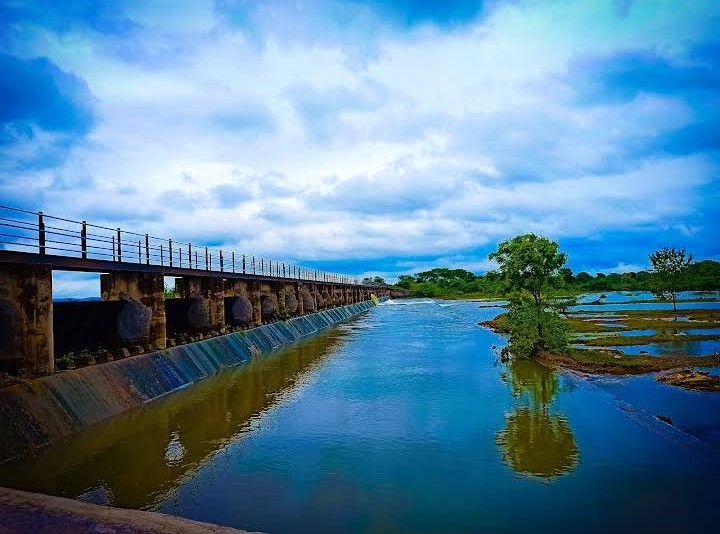
- Water Dam

- Location in Maharashtra India
- Coordinates: 20.3962°N 76.0000°E
- Country: India
- State: Maharashtra
- District: Buldhana
- Taluka: Buldhana

Government
  - Type: Panchayati Raj (India)
  - Body: Gram panchayat
  - Sarpanch: -
  - Up Sarpanch: -

Population (2011)
  - Total: 12,340

Language
  - Official: Marathi
- Time zone: UTC+5:30 (IST)
- Pin Code: 443106
- Area code: 07262
- Vehicle registration: MH-28

Dhad is a gram panchayat village in Buldhana Taluka in Buldhana District of Maharashtra, India. It belongs to Vidarbha region . It belongs to Amravati division.

== Demographics ==
According to 2011 census of India information the location code or village code of Dhad village is 529304. Dhad village is located in Buldhana tehsil of Buldhana district in Maharashtra. It is situated 25km away from sub-district headquarter Buldhana (tehsildar office) and 25km away from district headquarter Buldhana. As per 2009 stats, Dhad village is also a gram panchayat.

The total geographical area of village is 1541.27 hectares. Dhad has a total population of 12,340 peoples, out of which male population is 6,485 while female population is 5,855. Literacy rate of dhad village is 72.57% out of which 77.83% males and 66.75% females are literate. There are about 2,365 houses in dhad village. Pincode of dhad village locality is 443106.

When it comes to administration, Dhad village is administrated by a sarpanch who is elected representative of the village by the local elections. As per 2019 stats, Dhad village comes under Chikhli assembly constituency & Buldhana parliamentary constituency. Buldana is nearest town to dhad for all major economic activities, which is approximately 25km away.
