= Himmatrao Bawaskar =

Indian researcher & physician (born 1951)

Himmatrao Bawaskar Padma Shri
- Born: 3 March 1951 (age 75); Dehed village (now in Bhokardan, Jalna, Maharashtra), India
- Education: MBBS, MD
- Occupation: Physician
- Known for: Scorpion sting envenomation research
- Spouse: Dr. Pramodini Bawaskar
- Children: 2

Himmatrao Saluba Bawaskar is an Indian physician from Buldhana, Maharashtra. He is known for his research on treatment for scorpion stings. Much of his work has been published in the British medical journal The Lancet. He has also conducted research in the fields of snake bites, cardiovascular diseases, and hypothyroidism.

In 2022, Bawaskar was awarded India's third highest civil award, the Padma Shri.

== Early life and education ==
Bawaskar was born to Saluba and Rakhmabai in Dehed village (now in Bhokardan, Jalna, Maharashtra) He completed his schooling in Buldhana and worked in the farms, restaurants, temples, bookshops, the brick kiln, and held odd jobs to support his education.

He completed his studies at Government Medical College and Hospital, Nagpur. At Nagpur, he faced class- and caste-based discrimination and had to take a leave of absence for mental health reasons. He later completed an MD from the B. J. Medical College, Pune in 1981.

== Career ==
After his studies in Nagpur, Bawaskar was appointed in 1976 to a government-funded primary health centre in Birwadi, in Raigad district. Over the next 40 years of medical career, Bawaskar spent most of his time in the rural Konkan region of Maharashtra, at the foothills of Western Ghats.

At Birwadi, he witnessed high fatality rates of 8–40% due to the stings of Hottentotta tamulus scorpions; children being majority of the victims. The venom mainly affects the cardiovascular and pulmonary system, eventually leading to a pulmonary oedema, which may cause death. He compiled the findings and further tests were carried out at the Haffkine Institute in Mumbai. These latter stating these findings were published in The Lancet in 1978.

Bawaskar tried existing methods of symptomatic treatments with atropine, beta-blockers, chlorpromazine, and aminophylline. These methods however would not result in noticeable decrease in the death rates. Scorpion antivenom has little effect in clinical treatment but application of prazosin reduces the mortality rate to less than 4%.

As of 2016 he had published over 70 research articles. and his work has led the fatalities due to scorpion sting to drop from a high of 44% to <1%.

=== Other work ===
He has also conducted research in the fields of snake bite envenoming, cardiovascular diseases and hypothyroidism.

In the Vidarbha region of Maharashtra, Bawaskar has researched on the chronic renal failure associated with heavy metals contamination of drinking water.

He has written opinion pieces on ethics, corruption in medicine, public healthcare, violence against doctors, and state of medical research in India.
