= Takalsing =

Village in Maharashtra

Takalsing is a village in Ashti Taluka in Beed District of Maharashtra State, India. It belongs to Marathwada region, Aurangabad Division. It is located 82 km (51 mi) towards west from District headquarters Beed, 8 km (5.0 mi) from Ashti and 283 km (176 mi) from State capital Mumbai.

Tawalwadi (3 km (1.9 mi)), Ashti (9 km (5.6 mi)), Dhirdi (9 km (5.6 mi)), Ambhora ( 9 km (5.6 mi)) and Bandkhel (9 km (5.6 mi)) are the nearby villages to Takalsing. Takalsing is surrounded by Jamkhed Taluka towards East, Karjat Taluka towards South, Patoda Taluka towards East and Karmala Taluka towards South .

In Zilla, Parishad Madhyamik Shala Takalsing is a well-known school in Ashit Taluka. Kantilal Shravan Jogdand is 'Sarpanch of Takalsing village −2018

== Official language ==
The native language of Takalsing is Marathi and most of the village people speak Marathi.

== Population of Takalsing village ==
According to the 2011 census, Takalsing's population is 2753: 1426 males and 1327 females; 274 children aged 0–6 years: 156 boys and 118 girls.
