= Nalganga Dam =

- Location within Maharashtra
- Official name: Nalganga Dam D01216
- Location: Nalgangapur.motala dist.buldhana
- Coordinates: 20°43′34″N 76°10′49″E
- Opening date: 1967
- Owners: Government of Maharashtra, India

Dam and spillways
- Type of dam: Earthfill
- Impounds: Nalganga river
- Height: 29.8 m (98 ft)
- Length: 2,516 m (8,255 ft)
- Dam volume: 1,500 km^{3} (360 cu mi)

Reservoir
- Total capacity: 70,540 km^{3} (16,920 cu mi)
- Surface area: 10,980 km^{2} (4,240 sq mi)

The Nalganga Dam is an earthfill dam on the Nalganga River near Motala, Buldhana district, in the state of Maharashtra in India.

== Specifications ==
The height of the dam above its lowest foundation is 29.8 m (98 ft), while the length is 2,516 m (8,255 ft). Its volume is 1,500 km^{3} (360 cu mi), and its gross storage capacity is 71,860.00 km^{3} (17,240.13 cu mi).

== Purpose ==
- Irrigation
- The dam can provide a reliable source of water for irrigation, which can help increase agricultural productivity in Pimpalpati Village.
- The dam can also supply water for drinking and household purposes, reducing the pimpalpati villagers' reliance on other sources of water
- Mr.VILAS DIPCHAND PATIL{Sambare} (Helping for this information)

== See also ==
- Dams in Maharashtra
- List of reservoirs and dams in India
