= Rahul Siddhvinayak Bondre =

Indian politician

Rahul Bondre
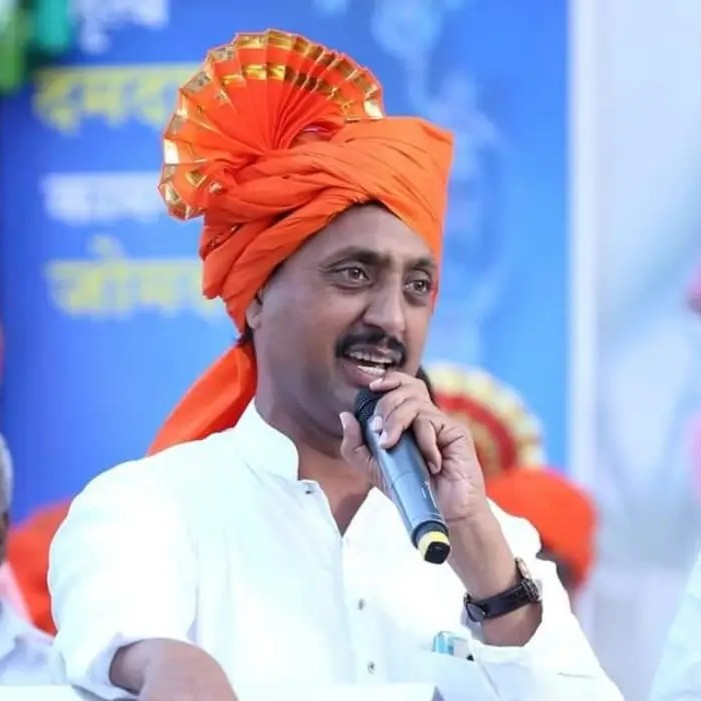

Member of Maharashtra Legislative Assembly
- In office 2009–2019
- Preceded by: Rekha Khedekar
- Succeeded by: Shweta Mahale
- Constituency: Chikhali

President of Indian National Congress Buldhana District
- In office 2014 – May 2026
- Succeeded by: Prakash Patil

Personal details
- Born: Rahul Siddhivinayak Bondre (Age 49) Chikhli, Buldhana District, Maharashtra
- Party: Indian National Congress
- Occupation: Politician
- Website: rahulbondre.in

Rahul Siddhivinayak Bondre is a member of the 13th Maharashtra Legislative Assembly. He representsChikhali Assembly constituency. He belongs to the Indian National Congress.
