= Pimpalgaon Raja =

Village in Maharashtra

- Village
- Location in Maharashtra, India
- Coordinates: 20°43′00″N 76°26′00″E
- Country: India
- State: Maharashtra
- District: Buldana

Government
  - Type: Grampanchiyat
  - Body: Grampanchiyat Members
  - Rank: 1

Population
  - Total: 15,234

Marathi, Hindi, English, Urdu
  - Official: Marathi, Hindi
- Time zone: UTC+5:30 (IST)
- Postal code: 444306
- Vehicle registration: MH-28

Pimpalgaon Raja is a gram panchayat located in tahsil Khamgaon of Buldhana district of Maharashtra situated on bank of Dnyanganga River. It is 14 km from Khamgaon. Pimpalgaon Raja is a large village located in Khamgaon of Buldhana district.

== Geography ==
20° 43' 0" North, 76° 26' 0" south

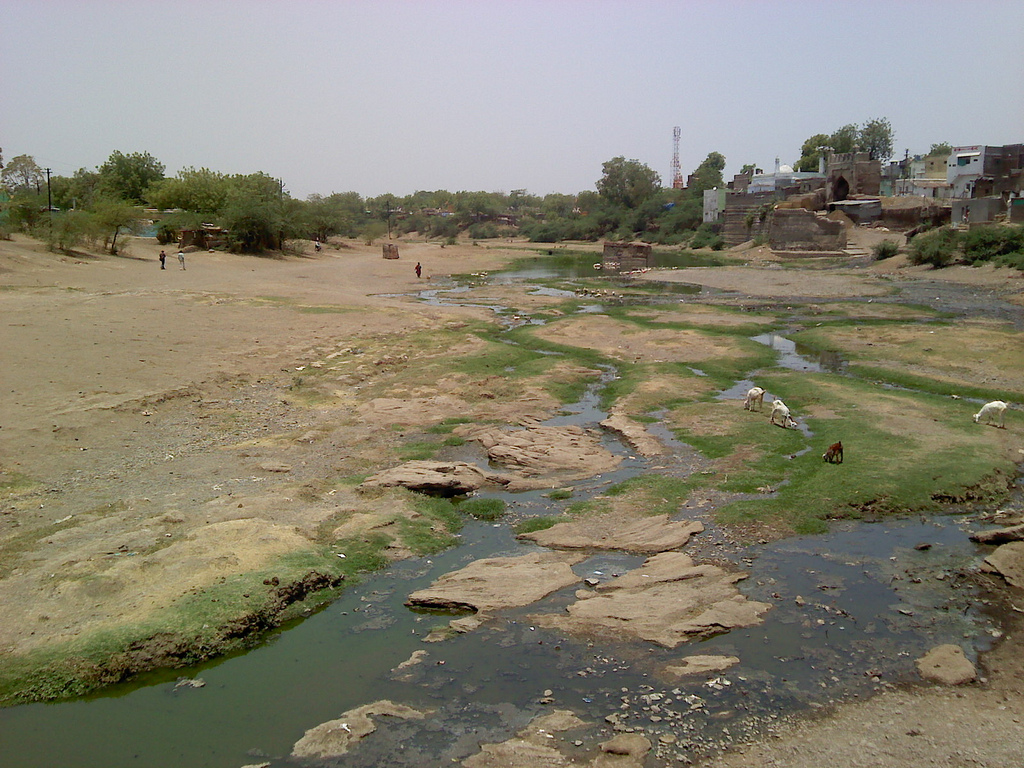
River Dnyanganga

- Renuka Devi Temple (Shivkalin temple). pilgrim mostly visit during the navratris popularly known as Jagdamba Temple
- Mahadev Temple
- Gajanan Maharaj Temple
- Shivakalin mahadeva temple
- Malvipura masjid.

 *Shri Sant Panchamdas Maharaj Math

== Education ==
- Zilha Parishad Marathi Primary Girls School
- Zilha Parishad Marathi Primary School.
- Zilha Parishad High School And Junior College Pimpalgaon Raja
- Gulshan-e-hafiza urdu primary school pimpalgaon raja
- Sahakar Vidya Mandir Pimpalgaon Raja
- Jamia Ammar bin Yaseer Rz Pimpalgaon Raja
- Urdu High School & Junior College Pimpalgaon Raja
- Madarsah Deeniyat Taqiya Masjid

== Agriculture ==
Agriculture is the primary economic activity in the town.Mostly people livelihood based on agriculture Cotton, Sorghum, Soybean, and other Legume crops are taken.

== Nearby places ==
Places around Pimpalgaon Raja:

- Tarwadi (9 km / 6 mi.Tarwadi is 292° West-northwest of Pimpalgaon Raja WNW)
- Goshing (12 km / 8 mi.Goshing is 262° West of Pimpalgaon Raja W)
- Nandura (13 km / 8 mi.Nandura is 8° North of Pimpalgaon Raja N, Pop. 39,650)
- Khamgaon (14 km / 9 mi.Khamgaon is 104° East Southeast of Pimpalgaon Raja ESE, Pop. 94,604)
