= Jamgaon, Ashti =

Village in Maharashtra

Jamgaon
- Village
- Location in Maharashtra, India
- Coordinates: 18.755270°N 75.192793°E
- Country: India
- State: Maharashtra
- District: Beed
- Taluka: Ashti

Area
  - Total: 14.6114 km^{2} (5.6415 sq mi)
- Time zone: UTC+5:30 (IST)
- PIN: 414203
- Telephone code: 02441
- Vehicle registration: MH-23 / 44
- Website: https://www.jamgaon-ashti.mahapanchayat.gov.in

Jamgaon is a village located in Ashti taluka, Beed district

As of 2011, it had a total population of 2,640. The total area of the village is 1,461.14 hectares (14.6114 km^{2}).

Nivrutti Dhas High School is located in the village.

== Notable Person ==
- Suresh Dash
