= Advihir =

Village in Maharashtra

Coordinates: 20°42′6″N 76°15′7″E

Advihir is a village in Motala taluka of Buldhana district, Amravati division, Maharashtra, India, and is 5 km east of Motala on Nandura–Motala road (MH SH 196).

As of 1976 Gazette, Advihir had around 2217 acres of agricultural land and 923 agriculturist in 569 houses. Advihir is one of the milk providing towns in Buldhana district. Around 5000 to 12000 liters of milk are exported daily from Advihir.

Nandura and Malkapur are nearby railway stations. There is a primary and secondary school in the village. There are nine temples in the village.
