= Gulam Rabbani Khan =

Indian Freedom Fighter, Soldier Of Indian National Army

Gulam Rabbani Khan (Freedom Fighter)
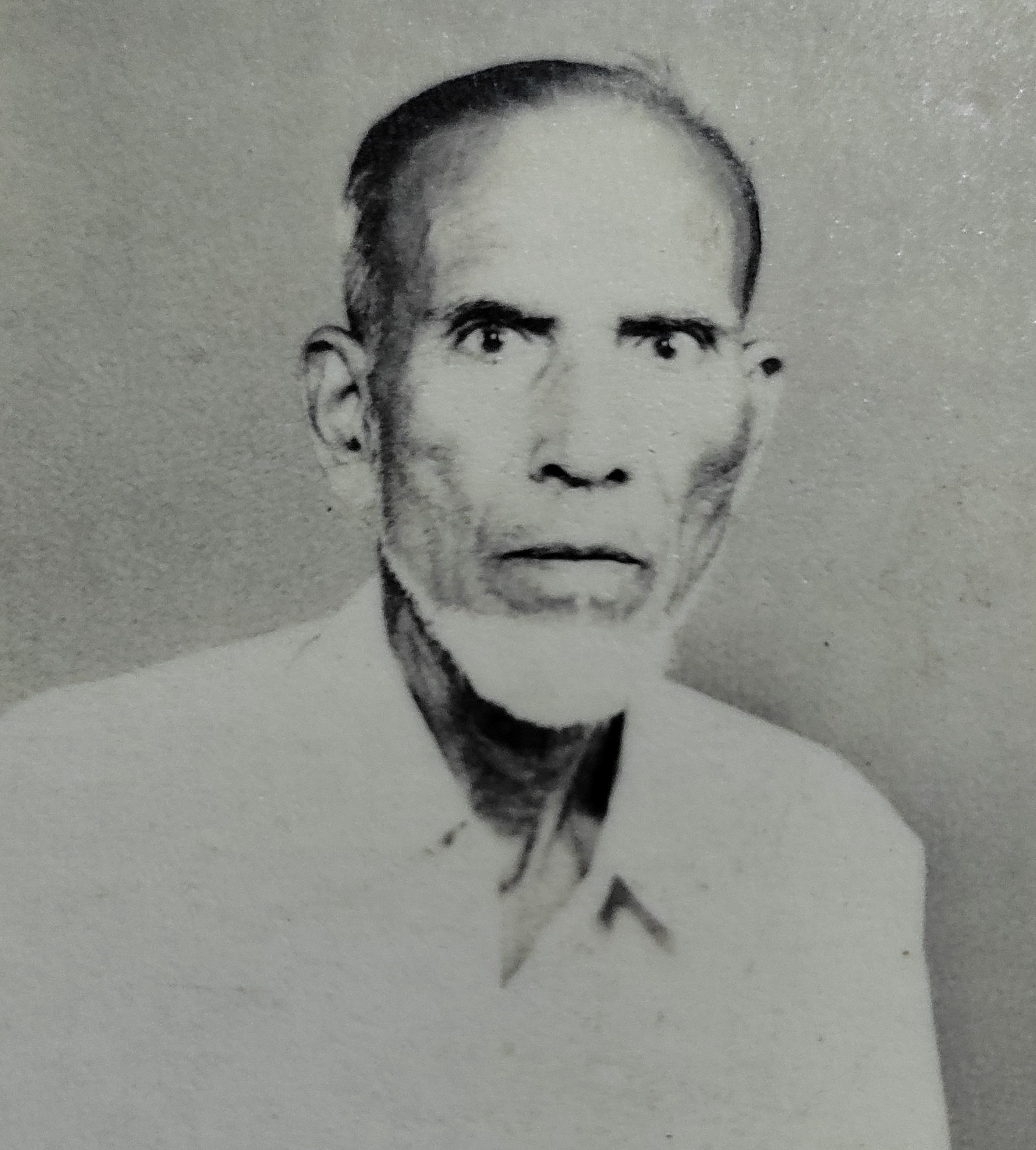
- Born: Gulam Rabbani Khan; 1918; Pimpalgaon Raja, Maharashtra, British India
- Died: 5 December 1991; Pimpalgaon Raja, Maharashtra, India
- Resting place: Malvipura Qabristan, Pimpalgaon Raja
- Occupation: Soldier of Indian National Army Azad Hind Fauj
- Years active: 1942–1991
- Organization: Pathan Regiment Indian National Army
- Known for: Played Active Role In Indian National Army Against British Government, For Freedom Struggle Movement
- Successor: Khan Yahya Ahmad
- Parent: Gulam Mustafa Khan

Gulam Rabbani Khan (Urdu:غلام ربانی خان, Hindi: गुलाम रब्बानी खान; (1918–1991) son of Gulam Mustafa Khan) was an Indian Freedom fighter, and a soldier in the British Indian Army. He joined the army in 1939. After two years he switched to the Indian National Army (Azad Hind Fauj) established by Subhas Chandra Bose to fight for Indian independence.

== Early life ==
Gulam Rabbani Khan was born in Malvipura of Pimpalgaon Raja in Berar Province, British India. He Joined the British Indian Army in 1939 and was sent abroad. In 1941 he was arrested by the Japanese Army during World War II.

== Freedom fighter ==
He participated in the Indian independence movement with father Gulam Mustafa Khan and Grandfather Gulam Ahmed Khan.

Captain General Mohan Singh and Captain Akram inspired Rabbani to join the Azad Hind Fauj. British officers asked him why he was leaving the British Indian Army. He told the British Commander that he had to free his country from British rule. He joined the Azad Hind Fauj Pathan Regiment.

On 15 August 1972, the Silver jubilee of India's independence was celebrated, and Rabbani was given a Certificate of Honor and a Medal.

He died on 5 December 1991.
