= Dadegaon =

Village in Maharashtra

- City
- Location in Maharashtra, India Dadegaon (India)
- Coordinates: 18.967°N 75.08°E
- Country: India
- State: Maharashtra
- District: Beed
- Elevation: 610 m (2,000 ft)

Population (2011)
  - Total: 2,846
- Demonym: Dadegaonkar

Languages
  - Official: Marathi
- Time zone: UTC+5:30 (IST)
- Postal code: 414202

Dadegaon is a village in Ashti tahsil of Beed District in Marathwada region of Maharashtra state, India.

== Geography ==
It is situated approximate 610 meters (2001.31 feet) above sea level. It is located 109 km towards west from District headquarters Beed. 54 km towards East from Ahmednagar. 10 km towards North from Kada. 46 km towards south from Pathardi. Dadegaon is 313 km from State capital Mumbai.

Dadegaon is surrounded by Jamkhed Taluka towards East, Patoda Taluka towards East, Karjat Taluka towards South, Shirur ( Ka ) Taluka towards North, Ahmednagar District towards West.

== Demographics ==
As of 2011 India census Dadegaon had a population of 2846 of which 1500 are males while 1346 are females. In Dadegaon village population of children with age 0-6 is 341 which makes up 11.98% of total population of village. Average Sex Ratio of Dadegaon village is 897 which is lower than Maharashtra state average of 929. Child Sex Ratio for the Dadegaon as per census is 795, lower than Maharashtra average of 894.

Dadegaon village has lower literacy rate compared to Maharashtra. In 2011, literacy rate of Dadegaon village was 69.90% compared to 82.34% of Maharashtra. In Dadegaon Male literacy stands at 78.85% while female literacy rate was 60.08%.

As per constitution of India and Panchyati Raaj Act, Dadegaon village is administrated by Sarpanch (Head of Village) who is elected representative of village.

== Education ==
=== Schools ===
- Zilla Parishad High School, Dadegaon
- Prabhu Ramchandra Vidyalaya, Dadegaon

=== Colleges near Dadegaon ===
- Shri Ram Junior College, Kada
- Pt.javaharlal Nehru Jr. College, Ashti
- Bhagawan Mahavidyalay, Ashti
- Amolak Jain Vidhyalaya, Kada
- Anandrao Dhode College, Kada

== Culture ==
Marathi is the local language.

The main occupation of people is farming. In Dadegaon village out of the total population, 1639 were engaged in work activities. 96.95% of workers describe their work as Main Work (Employment or Earning more than 6 Months) while 3.05% were involved in Marginal activity providing livelihood for less than 6 months. Of 1639 workers engaged in Main Work, 1048 were cultivators (owner or co-owner) while 420 were agricultural labourers.

Historical places: Ram Mandir, Surya Narayan Mandir

Dadegaon has a water supply under the Kadi project which was on a higher level than the town.

Dadegaon hosts the popular annual Ram Navami fair in March/April.
