= Kharbadi =

Village in Maharashtra

Coordinates: 21°23′N 78°21′E

Kharbadi is a village in Motala taluka, Buldhana district, Maharashtra, India. It is 3 km away from Motala.
