= Tavalwadi =

Village in Maharashtra

Tavalwadi is a small village situated at Ashti Taluka in Beed District in the state of Maharashtra in India.

Tavalwadi has a population of 1206 people, most of who are engaged in farming. It is famous for Bhaironath Temple. The farmers grown sugar cane, cotton, barley, jowar, wheat, soya bean and vegetables.
