= Chikhali Assembly constituency =

Vidhan Sabha constituency in India

Coordinates: 20.35°N 76.26°E

Chikhali
- Constituency No. 23 for the Maharashtra Legislative Assembly

Constituency details
- Country: India
- Region: Western India
- State: Maharashtra
- District: Buldhana
- Lok Sabha constituency: Buldhana
- Established: 1955
- Total electors: 306,506
- Reservation: None

Member of Legislative Assembly
- 15th Maharashtra Legislative Assembly
- Incumbent Shweta Mahale
- Party: BJP
- Alliance: NDA
- Elected year: 2019

Chikhali Assembly constituency is one of the 288 constituencies of Maharashtra Vidhan Sabha and one of the seven which are located in Buldhana district.

== Overview ==
It is a part of the Buldhana Lok Sabha constituency along with five other Vidhan Sabha (assembly) constituencies, viz. Buldhana, Sindkhed Raja, Mehkar, Khamgaon and Jalgaon (Jamod),

The seventh Malkapur from the Buldhana district is a part of the Raver Lok Sabha constituency from neighbouring Jalgaon district.

As per orders of Delimitation of Parliamentary and Assembly constituencies Order, 2008, No. 23 Chikhli Assembly constituency is composed of the following: 1. Chikhli Tehsil (Part), Revenue Circle - Undri, Amdapur, Eklara, Hatni, Kolara, Chikhli and Chikhli (MC), 2. Buldhana Tehsil (Part), Revenue Circle - Raipur, Dhad and Mhasla Bk of the Buldhana district.

Rahul Siddhvinayak Bondre of the Indian National Congress represents the constituency in the 13th Maharashtra Legislative Assembly, Chikhli constituency is considered as bastion of Congress Party as Rahul Bondre won it in tough "Modi wave".

Shweta Vidyadhar Mahale of Bharatiya Janata Party won in this constituency in 2019 Maharashtra Assembly Election with many votes than sitting MLA of Indian National Congress and destroyed 15 Years Bastion.

== Members of the Legislative Assembly ==
Year	Member	Party
1957	Namdeorao Punjaji Pawar	Indian National Congress
1962	Santoshrao Narayan Patil	Indian National Congress
1967	T. B. Khedekar	Indian National Congress
1972	Bharat Rajabhau Bondre	Indian National Congress
1978	Janardan Dattuappa Bondre	Indian National Congress (I)
1980	Bharat Rajabhau Bondre	Indian National Congress
1985	Bharat Rajabhau Bondre	Indian Congress
1990	Bharat Rajabhau Bondre	Indian National Congress
1995	Rekha Purushottam Khedekar	Bharatiya Janata Party
1999	Rekha Purushottam Khedekar	Bharatiya Janata Party
2004	Rekha Purushottam Khedekar	Bharatiya Janata Party
2009	Rahul Siddhvinayak Bondre	Indian National Congress
2014	Rahul Siddhvinayak Bondre	Indian National Congress
2019	Shweta Mahale	Bharatiya Janata Party
2024	Shweta Mahale	Bharatiya Janata Party

== Election results ==
=== Assembly Election 2024 ===
2024 Maharashtra Legislative Assembly election : Chikhali
Party	Candidate	Votes	%	±%
BJP	Shweta Mahale	109,212	48.95%	▲0.53
INC	Rahul Siddhvinayak Bondre	106,011	47.52%	▲2.63
NOTA	None of the Above	331	0.15%	▼0.39
Margin of victory		3,201	1.43%	▼2.09
Turnout		223,434	72.90%	▲7.32
Total valid votes		223,103		
Registered electors		306,506		▲3.89
BJP hold		Swing	▲0.53	

=== Assembly Election 2019 ===
2019 Maharashtra Legislative Assembly election : Chikhali
Party	Candidate	Votes	%	±%
BJP	Shweta Mahale	93,515	48.42%	▲22.10
INC	Rahul Siddhvinayak Bondre	86,705	44.89%	▲10.79
VBA	Ashok Shivsingh Suradkar	9,661	5.00%	New
NOTA	None of the Above	1,035	0.54%	▼0.20
Margin of victory		6,810	3.53%	▼4.26
Turnout		194,665	65.98%	▼2.54
Total valid votes		193,147		
Registered electors		295,018		▲11.11
BJP gain from INC		Swing	▲14.32	

=== Assembly Election 2014 ===
2014 Maharashtra Legislative Assembly election : Chikhali
Party	Candidate	Votes	%	±%
INC	Rahul Siddhvinayak Bondre	61,581	34.10%	▼14.78
BJP	Sureshaappa Wamanaappa Khabutare	47,520	26.31%	▼4.72
NCP	Dhrupadrao Bhagwan Sawale Patil	33,699	18.66%	New
SS	Dr. Pratapsing Dalsing Rajput	26,929	14.91%	New
MNS	Kharapas Vinod Bhaskarrao	3,103	1.72%	New
BBM	Kharat Vijay Gopala	2,253	1.25%	New
Independent	Ganesh Digambar Bahekar	2,001	1.11%	New
NOTA	None of the Above	1,321	0.73%	New
Margin of victory		14,061	7.79%	▼10.06
Turnout		181,970	68.53%	▲1.30
Total valid votes		180,582		
Registered electors		265,527		▲13.22
INC hold		Swing	▼14.78	

=== Assembly Election 2009 ===
2009 Maharashtra Legislative Assembly election : Chikhali
Party	Candidate	Votes	%	±%
INC	Rahul Siddhavinayak Bondre	76,465	48.88%	▲5.66
BJP	Prakash Rustumrao Javanjal	48,549	31.03%	▼12.88
JSS	Bharat Rajabhau Bondre	21,852	13.97%	New
Independent	Sanjay Sheshrao Ingle	2,523	1.61%	New
SBP	Kankhar Samadhan Sahebrao	2,061	1.32%	New
Shivrajya Party	Shelke Jayshree Sunil	2,029	1.30%	New
Independent	Shailandra Sheshrao Chavan	1,028	0.66%	New
Margin of victory		27,916	17.84%	▲16.22
Turnout		156,507	66.74%	▼6.09
Total valid votes		156,444		
Registered electors		234,514		▲8.69
INC gain from NCP		Swing	▲3.34	

=== Assembly Election 2004 ===
2004 Maharashtra Legislative Assembly election : Chikhali
Party	Candidate	Votes	%	±%
BJP	Rekha Purushottam Khedekar	68,969	43.91%	▼2.27
INC	Rahul Siddhavinayak Bondre	67,885	43.22%	New
BBM	Abhay Jagarao Chavan	16,734	10.65%	▼28.45
BSP	Siraj M. Siraj A. Samad	11,231	7.15%	New
Independent	Sekh.Siddik Shaikha Kureshi	7,266	4.63%	New
Margin of victory		2,558	1.63%	▼5.45
Turnout		157,101	72.81%	▲7.65
Total valid votes		157,071		
Registered electors		215,767		▲20.37
NCP gain from BJP		Swing	▼0.64	

=== Assembly Election 1999 ===
1999 Maharashtra Legislative Assembly election : Chikhali
Party	Candidate	Votes	%	±%
BJP	Rekha Purushottam Khedekar	53,923	46.17%	▲19.78
BBM	Dr. Pratapsing Dalsing Rajput	45,662	39.10%	▲19.68
NCP	Baban Chaudhari	15,463	13.24%	New
RJD	Palkar Vaibhao Uttam	1,064	0.91%	New
Margin of victory		8,261	7.07%	▲0.10
Turnout		125,850	70.21%	▼14.40
Total valid votes		116,781		
Registered electors		179,256		▲1.12
BJP hold		Swing	▲19.78	

=== Assembly Election 1995 ===
1995 Maharashtra Legislative Assembly election : Chikhali
Party	Candidate	Votes	%	±%
BJP	Rekha Purushottam Khedekar	37,216	26.39%	▼12.45
BBM	Dr. Pratapsing Dalsing Rajput	27,385	19.42%	New
Independent	Bharat Rajabhau Bondre	25,042	17.76%	New
Independent	Dhrupadrao Bhagawanrao Sawale Patil	24,051	17.06%	New
INC	Vitthalrao Sonaji Patil	13,123	9.31%	▼43.41
Independent	Thutte Eknath Punjaji	5,801	4.11%	New
JD	Bahekar Laxman Sitaram	4,473	3.17%	▼3.62
Margin of victory		9,831	6.97%	▼6.90
Turnout		144,449	81.48%	▲7.80
Total valid votes		141,011		
Registered electors		177,275		▲10.29
BJP gain from INC		Swing	▼26.33	

=== Assembly Election 1990 ===
1990 Maharashtra Legislative Assembly election : Chikhali
Party	Candidate	Votes	%	±%
INC	Bharat Rajabhau Bondre	60,796	52.72%	▲16.37
BJP	Jawanjal Prakash Rustumarao	44,797	38.85%	New
JD	Shewale Kisan Rangnath	7,832	6.79%	New
Margin of victory		15,999	13.87%	▼5.84
Turnout		117,318	72.99%	▲0.56
Total valid votes		115,318		
Registered electors		160,734		▲20.48
INC gain from IC(S)		Swing	▼3.34	

=== Assembly Election 1985 ===
1985 Maharashtra Legislative Assembly election : Chikhali
Party	Candidate	Votes	%	±%
IC(S)	Bharat Rajabhau Bondre	53,243	56.06%	New
INC	Janardan Dattuappa Bondre	34,523	36.35%	New
Independent	Suresh Eknath Ghorpade	5,600	5.90%	New
Independent	Keshaorao Jaiwantrao Bahekar	869	0.91%	New
Independent	Kasture Vijaykumar Sampatrao	738	0.78%	New
Margin of victory		18,720	19.71%	▲5.98
Turnout		96,591	72.40%	▼1.16
Total valid votes		94,973		
Registered electors		133,414		▲11.80
IC(S) gain from INC(U)		Swing	▲10.87	

=== Assembly Election 1980 ===
1980 Maharashtra Legislative Assembly election : Chikhali
Party	Candidate	Votes	%	±%
INC(U)	Bharat Rajabhau Bondre	39,012	45.19%	New
INC(I)	Janardan Dattuappa Bondre	27,162	31.46%	▼0.99
BJP	Daga Chittaranjan Ramvilas	17,600	20.39%	New
Independent	Borde Bhaurao Onkar	1,329	1.54%	New
Independent	Bharatsing Jaising More	1,225	1.42%	New
Margin of victory		11,850	13.73%	▲13.52
Turnout		88,258	73.96%	▼6.08
Total valid votes		86,328		
Registered electors		119,328		▲9.31
INC(U) gain from INC(I)		Swing	▲12.74	

=== Assembly Election 1978 ===
1978 Maharashtra Legislative Assembly election : Chikhali
Party	Candidate	Votes	%	±%
INC(I)	Janardan Dattuappa Bondre	27,785	32.45%	New
INC	Bharat Rajabhau Bondre	27,607	32.24%	▼18.19
JP	Keshaorao Jaiwantrao Bahekar	27,447	32.06%	New
Independent	Chintaman Mahadeo Kharat	1,557	1.82%	New
Independent	Vidwans Balwant Narayan	638	0.75%	New
Independent	Hiwale Datta Gangaram	583	0.68%	New
Margin of victory		178	0.21%	▼22.75
Turnout		87,867	80.49%	▲13.47
Total valid votes		85,617		
Registered electors		109,168		▲11.37
INC(I) gain from INC		Swing	▼17.98	

=== Assembly Election 1972 ===
1972 Maharashtra Legislative Assembly election : Chikhali
Party	Candidate	Votes	%	±%
INC	Bharat Rajabhau Bondre	32,110	50.44%	▲10.82
ABJS	Keshaorao Jaiwantrao Bahekar	17,492	27.47%	▼6.75
INC(O)	Shankarrao Sakharam Patil	9,361	14.70%	New
RPI	Sugdeorao Banduji Jadhao	4,480	7.04%	▼4.59
Margin of victory		14,618	22.96%	▲17.57
Turnout		65,835	67.16%	▼5.20
Total valid votes		63,666		
Registered electors		98,020		▲14.54
INC hold		Swing	▲10.82	

=== Assembly Election 1967 ===
1967 Maharashtra Legislative Assembly election : Chikhali
Party	Candidate	Votes	%	±%
INC	T. B. Khedekar	23,783	39.62%	▼16.13
ABJS	Keshaorao Jaiwantrao Bahekar	20,545	34.22%	▲4.68
Independent	D. T. Mahasaki	7,847	13.07%	New
RPI	G. S. Jadhao	6,982	11.63%	▲1.38
Independent	K. T. Sarakate	876	1.46%	New
Margin of victory		3,238	5.39%	▼20.81
Turnout		64,956	75.90%	▼5.78
Total valid votes		60,033		
Registered electors		85,576		▲5.76
INC hold		Swing	▼16.13	

=== Assembly Election 1962 ===
1962 Maharashtra Legislative Assembly election : Chikhali
Party	Candidate	Votes	%	±%
INC	Santoshrao Narayan Patil	34,254	55.75%	▲13.9
ABJS	Keshaorao Jaiwantrao Bahekar	18,154	29.55%	New
RPI	Syed Habib Rabi Syed Farid	6,300	10.25%	New
Independent	Kalu Tukaram Sarkate	2,734	4.45%	New
Margin of victory		16,100	26.20%	▲23.14
Turnout		65,016	80.35%	▲14.37
Total valid votes		61,442		
Registered electors		80,917		▲16.52
INC hold		Swing	▲13.90	

=== Assembly Election 1957 ===
1957 Bombay State Legislative Assembly election : Chikhali
Party	Candidate	Votes	%	±%
INC	Pawar Namdeo Punjaji	17,893	41.85%	New
Independent	Bhagaji Ramji	16,582	38.79%	New
SCF	Janwatkar Tukaram Kondaba	4,631	10.83%	New
Independent	Parwe Sadashio Ashru	2,018	4.72%	New
Independent	Wankhaday Sakharam Kondiram	1,628	3.81%	New
Margin of victory		1,311	3.07%	
Turnout		42,752	61.56%	
Total valid votes		42,752		
Registered electors		69,447		
INC win (new seat)				

== See also ==
- Chikhli, Maharashtra
