= Ashti, Beed =

Ashti
- Town
- Location in Maharashtra, India
- Coordinates: 18.8054151°N 75.1727902°E
- Country: India
- State: Maharashtra
- District: Beed
- Demonym: Ashtikar

Languages
- Time zone: UTC+5:30 (IST)
- PIN: 414203
- Telephone code: 02441
- Vehicle registration: MH-23 / 44
- Vidhan Sabha constituency: Ashti

Ashti is a city in Beed subdivision of Beed district in the Indian state of Maharashtra. Ashti (constituency number 231) is one of the six Vidhan Sabha constituencies located in Beed district. It covers the entire Ashti and Patoda tehsils and part of the Shirur tehsil of this district.

== History ==
Morala Fort (Marathi: मोराळा किल्ला) is a historical fort located in Morala, Beed district, Maharashtra, India.

== Location ==
The fort is situated in Morala village, approximately 65 km from Beed and around 30 km from Ashti, which is the taluka headquarters.

== Description ==
Morala Fort is considered a local landmark and point of historical interest. Modern travel platforms describe it as a tourist destination with an average visitor rating of 4.6 out of 5 stars.

== Dharmaji Prataprao ==
Dharmaji Prataprao (also known as Dharmaji Prataprao Garje) was a local leader from Beed district in Maharashtra, India, who is claimed to have led what some consider one of the first uprisings against the British in that region.

=== Early life and background ===
He belonged to the Vanjari, and was based in the Hatola village in Ashti taluka, Beed district. His family is said to have held a local stronghold (garh) in that village. The first references to his family's service are tied to historical associations with the Maratha empire.

=== Uprising against oppression ===
During the early 19th century, under the rule of the Nizam and dealing with oppressive agrarian demands, Dharmaji Prataprao refused to pay certain taxes (ṣhetsārā or land revenue) demanded under the combined pressure of the Nizam's local agents aligned with British influence. He organized a resistance, trained youth in marksmanship, gathered weapons, and fortified his defensive position.

On 11 July 1818, it is claimed British forces under Mortza Yarjungu [or “Murtza Yarjange” etc.] and Lieutenant Sutherland advanced toward Beed to suppress the uprising. Dharmaji and his followers resisted from the fort in Hatola. The British laid siege; Dharmaji's younger brother was among those taken captive. After prolonged conflict, the defenders left the fort and fled.

=== Legacy of Morala Fort ===
Although the uprising was ultimately quelled, Dharmaji's uprising is remembered locally as an early spark of resistance in the Beed region. His bravery is sometimes cited by historians and local tradition as among earliest acts of defiance against colonial or semi-colonial rule in that area. There are calls in Beed for more recognition, memorials, and historical documentation of his role.

== See also ==
- List of forts in Maharashtra

The town of Ashti came to prominence around the 16th century when it was awarded to the Dhonde as a "jagir". The Dhondes were one of the fiercest warriors and equally well educated and known for their benevolent rule. Under the Dhonde dynasty, the barren and rocky land of Ashti was converted to a more fertile place and a trade center that it is today.

The Sina River is a 55 km long tributary of the Bhima River in the Indian state of Maharashtra, with its sources near Ahilyanagar. The river's basin extends across the districts of Ahilyanagar, Beed, Dharashiv, and Solapur. The river is known to flood residential areas and roads during the monsoon season, and water quality studies have been conducted to address pollution issues. Key details about the Sina River: Length: Approximately 55 kilometers. Location: Maharashtra, India. Tributary of: Bhima River. Sources: Near Jamgaon and Sasewadi, Jeur, close to Ahilyanagar. Basin: Covers districts of Ahilyanagar, ASHTI Tauka (BEED) Dharashiv, and Solapur.

== Villages ==
Ashti taluka comprises 176 villages, among which:

- Morala
- Dadegaon
- Sangvi Ashti
- Deulgaon Ghat
- Jamgaon
- Parodi
- Takalsing
- Tavalwadi
- Hatolan
