= Deulgaon Awachar =

Village in Maharashtra

Deulgaon Deulgaon Awachar
- Village
- Location in Maharashtra Deulgaon (India)
- Country: India
- State: Maharashtra
- District: Parbhani

Government
  - Type: Grampanchayat
- Elevation: 420 m (1,380 ft)

Population (2011)
  - Total: 2,241

Languages
  - Official: Marathi
- Time zone: UTC+5:30 (IST)
- PIN: 431505
- Telephone code: 02452
- Vehicle registration: MH-22

Deulgaon, commonly known as Deulgaon Awachar, is a village located in Manwat taluka of Parbhani district, in the state of Maharashtra, India. It lies 18 kilometres (11 mi) from it taluka headquarters at Manwat.

== Demographics ==
As per 2011 census:

- Deulgaon Awachar has 524 families residing. The village has population of 2241.
- Out of the population of 2241, 1139 are males while 1102 are females.
- Literacy rate of the village is 69.50%.
- Average sex ratio of the village is 968 females to 1000 males. Average sex ratio of Maharashtra state is 929.
