= Deulgaon Kaman =

Village in Maharashtra

Deulgaon Deulgaon Kaman
- Village
- Location in Maharashtra Deulgaon (India)
- Country: India
- State: Maharashtra
- District: Jalna

Government
  - Type: Grampanchayat
- Elevation: 523 m (1,716 ft)

Population (2011)
  - Total: 861

Languages
  - Official: Marathi
- Time zone: UTC+5:30 (IST)
- PIN: 431114
- Telephone code: 02485
- Vehicle registration: MH-21

Deulgaon, commonly known as Deulgaon Kaman, is a village located in Bhokardan taluka of Jalna district, in state of Maharashtra, India.

== Demographics ==
As per 2011 census

- Deulgaon Kaman has 172 families residing. The village has population of 861.
- Out of the population of 861, 447 are males while 414 are females.
- Literacy rate of the village is 69.66%.
- Average sex ratio of the village is 926 females to 1000 males. Average sex ratio of Maharashtra state is 929.

== Geography, and transport ==
Distance between Deulgaon Kaman, and district headquarter Jalna is 53 kilometres (33 mi).
