= Deulgaon Dhudhate =

Village in Maharashtra

Deulgaon Deulgaon Dhudhate
- Village
- Location in Maharashtra Deulgaon (India)
- Coordinates: 19.079494942411742°N 76.88944094712565°E
- Country: India
- State: Maharashtra
- District: Parbhani

Government
  - Type: Grampanchayat
- Elevation: 384 m (1,260 ft)

Population (2011)
  - Total: 3,355

Languages
  - Official: Marathi
- Time zone: UTC+5:30 (IST)
- PIN: 431514
- Telephone code: 02452
- Vehicle registration: MH-22

Deulgaon, commonly known as "Deulgaon Dhudhate" is a village located in Purna taluka of Parbhani district, in state of Maharashtra.

== Demographics ==
As per 2011 census:

- Deulgaon Dhudhate has 690 families residing. The village has population of 3355.
- Out of the population of 3355, 1722 are males while 1633 are females.
- Literacy rate of the village is 66.15%.
- Average sex ratio of the village is 948 females to 1000 males. Average sex ratio of Maharashtra state is 929.

== Geography, and transport ==
Distance between Deulgaon Dhudhate, and district headquarter Parbhani is 31 kilometres (19 mi).
