= Kothali, Maharashtra =

Village in Maharashtra

Kothali कोथळी
- Village
- Interactive map of Kothali

Kothali is a village in Shirol Tehsil, Kolhapur district in Maharashtra state, India, situated on the bank of the Krishna River. It is notable for agricultural production. It is one of the oldest village in Maharashtra as per one research. It is banked on river Krishna and Waarana.

== People ==
Kothali's population is around 15,000. The native people of this village very kind and many are devotees of various temple / God. There is primary school and one secondary school in the village. The students educated from village are in all fields like engineer, doctor, Farmer, teacher, advocate, Businessman.

== Economy ==
Kothali is noted for the cultivation of tomatoes and for sugarcane production. Grapes, vegetables, and flowers are also grown.

== Transportation ==
Kothali is well connected to Jaysingpur, 6 kilometres (6,000 m) away, by public transport buses. Recently, roads were constructed from Kothali to neighboring villages. Travel to Kothali by water is also possible as it is situated on the banks of the Krishna River and small boats are available for travelling on the river.
