= Sadanand Deshmukh =

Marathi poet, lyricist, writer and actor

- Born: 9 October 1939; Amdapur, Buldhana district
- Writing career
- Notable works: Baromas, Tahan, Charimera, Bhuiringani
- Notable awards: Sahitya Akademi Award; 2004 Baromas

Sadanand Namdev Deshmukh is a Marathi language author. He was awarded with Sahitya Akademi Award in 2004 for his novel Baromas. His other novels include Tahan, Charimera, Bhuiringani.

== Works ==
- Baromas
- Tahan
- Charimera
- Bhuiringani
