= Vanita Jagdeo Borade =

Indian conservationist (born 1975)

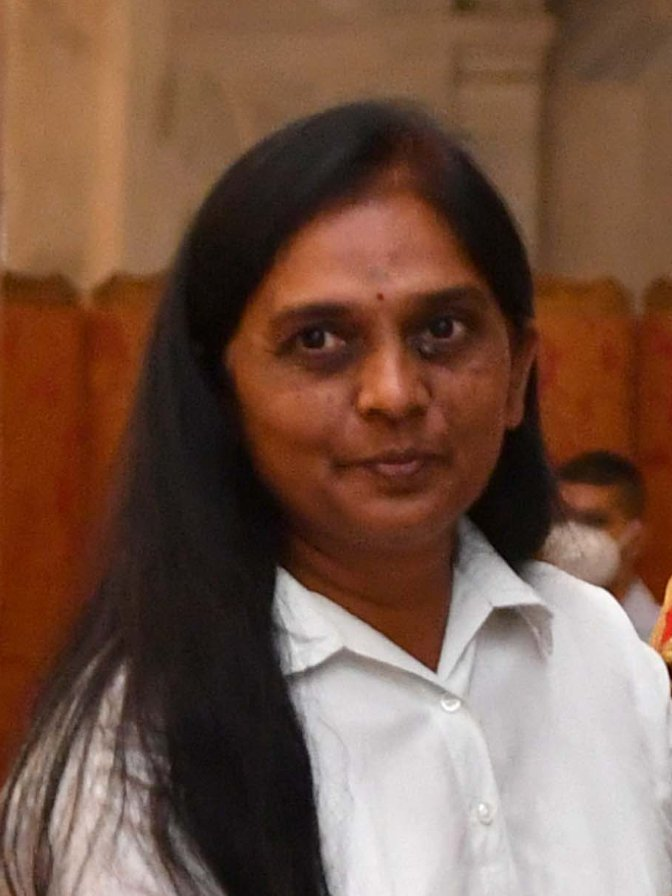
- Borade in 2022
- Born: 25 May 1975 (age 51)
- Known for: Rescuing snakes
- Awards: Nari Shakti Puraskar (2020)

Vanita Jagdeo Borade (born 25 May 1975) is an Indian conservationist and the founder of the Soyre Vanchare Multipurpose Foundation, which works in Wildlife conservation. She specializes in rescuing snakes and has been recognized as "India's first woman snake friend". Borade received the Nari Shakti Puraskar from the Government of India in recognition of her conservation efforts.

== Personal life ==
Vanita Jagdeo Borade was born on 25 May 1975. She lives with her husband in Buldhana, Maharashtra.

== Career ==
Borade learned to be at ease with wildlife as she was brought up on a farm, with friends who shared her interest in the local environment. She began catching venomous snakes at the age of twelve without ever being bitten. She founded the Soyre Vanchare Multipurpose Foundation, an environmental organization focusing on preventing pollution and protecting wildlife. Having rescued more than 50,000 snakes, Borade has been included in Guinness World Records. She is particularly compassionate towards snakes, but also has experience with Honey bee.

Borade has taught others how to treat snake bites, and aimed to reduce ophidiophobia (a fear of snakes) by providing realistic information about snakes: only ten percent of snakes in India are venomous, and every hospital has freely available antivenom drugs.

== Awards and recognition ==
India Post recognized Borade's achievements by issuing a stamp with her portrait. On International Women's Day 2022, she received the 2020 Nari Shakti Puraskar, the highest civilian honour for women in India, from President Ram Nath Kovind. Locally known as the "snake woman", Borade has been recognized as "India's first woman snake friend".
