= Deulgaon Mahi =

Village in Maharashtra, India

- Village
- Location within Maharashtra
- Coordinates: 20°05′N 76°11′E
- Country: India
- State: Maharashtra
- District: Buldhana

Government
  - Type: Grampanchayat
- Elevation: 502 m (1,647 ft)

Population (2011)
  - Total: 10,127

Languages
- Time zone: UTC+5:30 (IST)
- PIN: 443206
- Telephone code: 07261
- Vehicle registration: MH-28

"Deulgaon Mahi" is a village located in Deulgaon Raja taluka of Buldhana district, in state of Maharashtra, having six wards and 17 members' Grampanchayat body.

Some historical facts about Deulgaon Mahi:

1-The then taluka-Deulgaon raja

2- Population in 1910 - 901

3-Total area -4725 acres

4-Revenue- 2921 / - Rs.

5-Native inhabitants of the village-Kasar (bronze metal workers)

6-There are things about the word "Mahi" in the name Deulgaon Mahi:

i) Mahi was the name of a goddess to be worshiped.

7-Marathi School: There was a Marathi school for boys in the village since 1850 in which an average of 43 boys were studying every day in 1910. (ie there was not a single girl in these 43). The name of the school proves that it was a boys' school from the beginning. In the near future, the school is open to all.

8-Famous Places in the Village: i) Garhi ii) Branch Post Office iii) Opium & Liquor Shops iv) Post Bungalow

9-The weekly market day is Sunday from that time.

10-Famous product in the village: Blanket being made by "Dhangar community and till recently the village was famous for these blankets.

== Demographics ==
As per 2011 census:

- Deulgaon Mahi has 2146 families residing. The village has population of 10127.
- Out of the population of 10127, 5248 are males while 4879 are females.
- Literacy rate of the village is 84.47%.
- Average sex ratio of the village is 930 females to 1000 males. Average sex ratio of Maharashtra state is 929.

== Geography, and transport ==
Distance between Deulgaon Mahi, and district headquarter Buldhana is 59 kilometres (37 mi). Deulgaon Mahi city is famous for "Khadakpurna dam" which is the source of water for different purposes for a number of villages around Deulgaon Mahi. It is a well-known marketplace for small villages around it.

Deulgaon Mahi is connected to almost all major cities like Jalna, Aurangabad, Buldhana, Khamgaon, Amravati, Nagpur, Pune with a network of roads. This village is well connected to main cities of Maharashtra.
