= Diploma in Pharmacy =

Indian two year pharmacy credential

In India, Diploma in Pharmacy (often shortened as DPharm or DPharma) is an entry-level tertiary pharmacy credential. It is obtained following two years of training. Pharmacy colleges across the country offer this program, teaching students basic knowledge and practical skills needed in pharmacy. Students can enroll in the course after successfully completing higher secondary education in science stream with physics, chemistry and either biology or mathematics as subjects. After obtaining the diploma, registration with the pharmacy council is required to be a registered pharmacist. A D. Pharm holder can also enroll for a professional (undergraduate) degree course of Bachelor of Pharmacy via lateral entry scheme.

A diploma holder can be employed as a registered pharmacist in a hospital or pharmacy dispensing drugs and pharmaceuticals. It is mandatory that at least one person employed in a pharmacy be a qualified and registered pharmacist.

== First year subjects ==
Total marks -1000

1. Pharmaceutics
2. Pharmaceutical chemistry
3. Pharmacognosy
4. Human Anatomy and Physiology
5. Social Pharmacy
6. Pharmaceutics practical
7. Pharmaceutical chemistry practical
8. Pharmacognosy practical
9. Human Anatomy and Physiology practical
10. Social Pharmacy practical

== Second year subjects ==
Total marks -1100

1. Pharmacology
2. Community Pharmacy & management
3. Biochemistry & Clinical Pathology
4. Pharmacotherapeutics
5. Hospital & Clinical Pharmacy
6. Pharmacy law & ethics
7. Pharmacology practical
8. Community Pharmacy & management practical
9. Biochemistry & Clinical Pathology practical
10. Pharmacotherapeutics practical
11. Hospital & Clinical Pharmacy practical
