= Deulgaon Ghat =

Village in Maharashtra

Deulgaon Deulgaon Ghat
- Village
- Location in Maharashtra Deulgaon (India)
- Country: India
- State: Maharashtra
- District: Beed

Government
  - Type: Grampanchayat
- Elevation: 552 m (1,811 ft)

Population (2011)
  - Total: 1,843

Languages
  - Official: Marathi
- Time zone: UTC+5:30 (IST)
- PIN: 414202
- Telephone code: 02441
- Vehicle registration: MH-23

Deulgaon, commonly known as "Deulgaon Ghat" is a village located in Ashti taluka of Beed district, in state of Maharashtra.

== Demographics ==
As per 2011 census

- Deulgaon Ghat has 407 families residing. The village has population of 1843.
- Out of the population of 1843, 977 are males while 866 are females.
- Literacy rate of the village is 75.00%.
- Average sex ratio of the village is 886 females to 1000 males. Average sex ratio of Maharashtra state is 929.

== Geography, and transport ==
Distance between Deulgaon Ghat, and district headquarter Beed is 79 kilometres (49 mi).
