= Dnyanganga Wildlife Sanctuary =

Wildlife sanctuary in Buldhana district, Maharashtra, India

- Dhyanganga Wildlife Sanctuary
- Location within Maharashtra Location within India
- Interactive map of Dnyanganga Wildlife Sanctuary
- Location: Buldhana district, Maharashtra, India
- Nearest city: Khamgaon
- Coordinates: 20.548°N 76.650°E
- Area: 205.20 km^{2} (79.23 sq mi)
- Designation: Wildlife sanctuary
- Established: 1997
- Governing body: Forest Department, Government of Maharashtra
- Website: https://mahaforest.gov.in

Dnyanganga Wildlife Sanctuary (also spelled Dhyanganga Wildlife Sanctuary in some sources) is a wildlife sanctuary located in the Buldhana district of the Indian state of Maharashtra. The sanctuary is part of Melghat Tiger Reserve and is located near the Dnyanganga river, a tributary of the Tapti.

The sanctuary was notified by the Government of Maharashtra in 1997 under the Wildlife Protection Act, 1972 and covers an area of approximately 205.20 km^{2}. It lies within the Vidarbha region of Maharashtra and forms an important protected forest tract supporting regional biodiversity and wildlife movement.

== History ==
The forest area comprising the present Dnyanganga Wildlife Sanctuary was historically managed as reserved forest prior to its declaration as a protected area. Recognising its ecological importance, the Government of Maharashtra declared the area a wildlife sanctuary in 1997 under provisions of the Wildlife Protection Act, 1972. Since notification, the sanctuary has been managed by the Maharashtra Forest Department with objectives focused on wildlife conservation, habitat protection, and regulation of human activities.

== Geography and climate ==
Dnyanganga Wildlife Sanctuary is located in southern Buldhana district, near the towns of Khamgaon and Buldhana. The sanctuary forms part of the Deccan basaltic landscape and is characterised by undulating terrain with low hill ranges and shallow valleys. Elevation in the sanctuary generally ranges from about 250 to 550 metres above sea level. The climate is tropical monsoon in nature, with most rainfall occurring during the southwest monsoon season from June to September. Seasonal streams associated with the Dnyanganga River and its tributaries serve as important water sources for wildlife, particularly during the dry months.

== Flora ==
The sanctuary is dominated by southern tropical dry deciduous forest. Teak (Tectona grandis) is the predominant tree species, along with anjan (Hardwickia binata), ain (Terminalia elliptica), dhaora (Anogeissus latifolia), and bamboo species. Vegetation structure varies from open woodland to relatively dense forest patches, supporting a range of ecological niches and contributing to overall biodiversity.

== Fauna ==
Dnyanganga Wildlife Sanctuary supports a diverse assemblage of mammals typical of central Indian dry forests. Documented species include

- leopard (Panthera pardus),
- sloth bear (Melursus ursinus),
- striped hyena (Hyaena hyaena),
- sambar deer (Rusa unicolor),
- barking deer (Muntiacus muntjak),
- Nilgai (Boselaphus tragocamelus),
- wild boar (Sus scrofa),
- jackal
- Jungle cat.

Occasional reports of tiger movement have been recorded, indicating the sanctuary's role within a broader wildlife corridor in the Vidarbha region.

Occasional reports of Indian bison (Gaur) has also been reported on the sanctuary.

== Conservation and tourism ==
The sanctuary is administered by the Maharashtra Forest Department through the Buldhana Forest Division. Management priorities include habitat improvement, fire prevention and control, soil and water conservation measures, prevention of illegal grazing and tree felling, and protection against poaching.

The Sanctuary is not developed as a major tourism destination, and visitor access is regulated primarily for conservation and educational purposes. The forest department periodically conducts nature awareness programmes, wildlife census exercises, and guided forest visits aimed at promoting conservation awareness while minimising disturbance to wildlife.

== See also ==
- Lonar Wildlife Sanctuary
- Wan Wildlife Sanctuary
