= Dnyanganga River =

Coordinates: 20°55′46″N 76°29′21″E

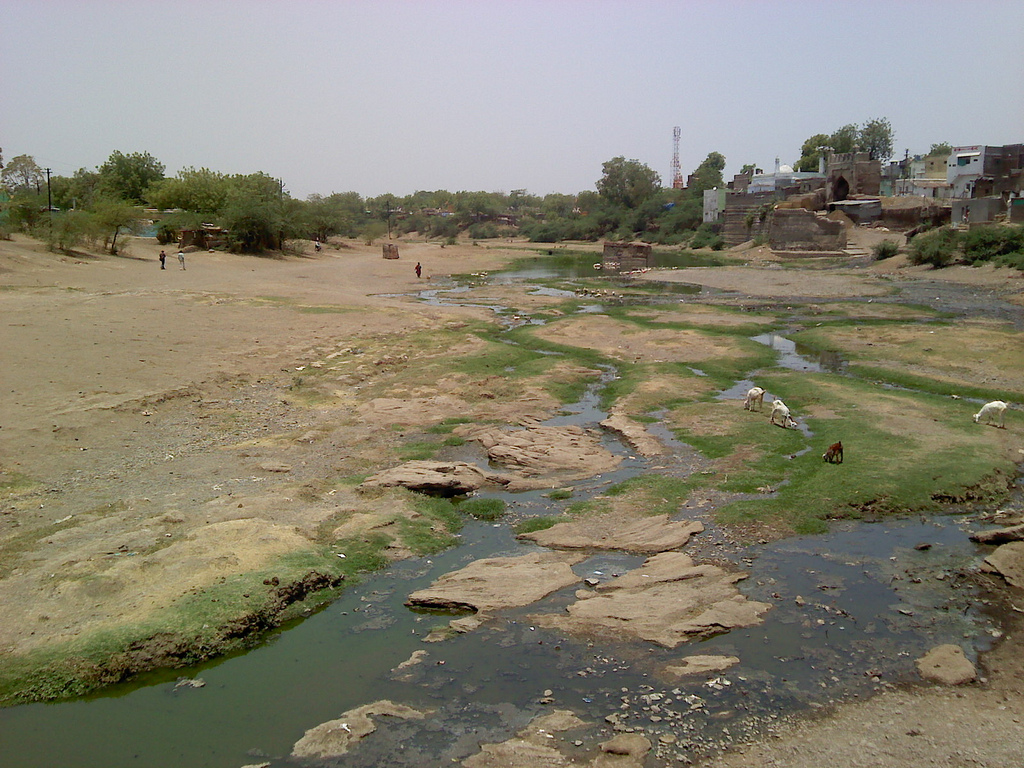
- Dnyanganga at Nandura
- Native name: ज्ञानगंगा नदी (Marathi)

Location
- Country: India

Physical characteristics
- Source
  - location: Near Dongar khandala, Taluka buldana, Dist. Buldhana
- Mouth
  - location: Falls into river Purna on south bank near Yerli, Ta. Nandura.
- Length: 50.5 mi (81.3 km)

Basin features
- River system: Tapti River

Dnyanganga (Marathi: ज्ञानगंगा नदी) is a minor river in Buldhana district of Maharashtra, India. It is a tributary of the Purna River, which itself is a tributary of the Tapti River.

== See also ==
- List of rivers of India
- Dnyanganga Wildlife Sanctuary
- Rivers of India
