= Buldhana district =

- District of Maharashtra
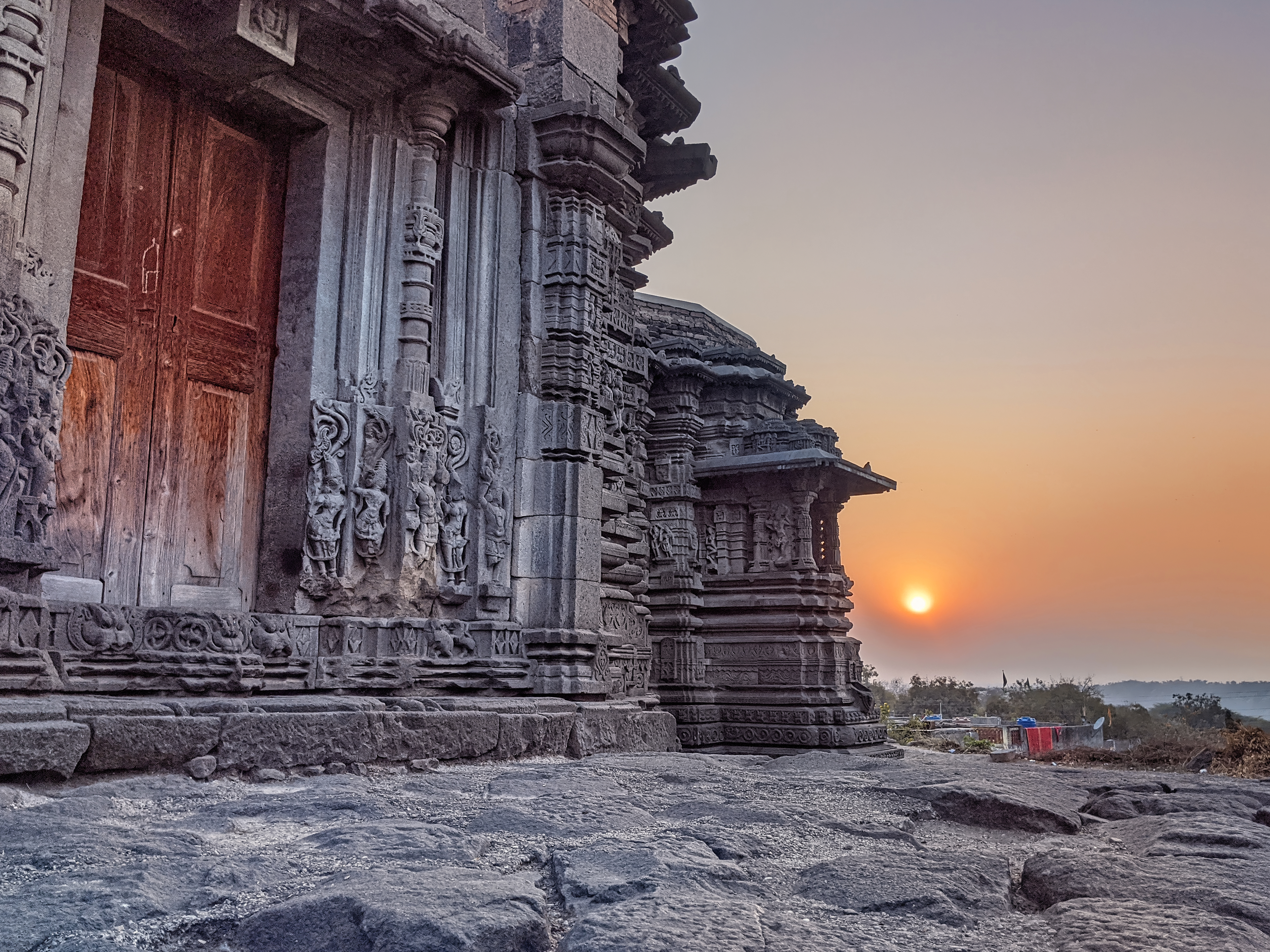
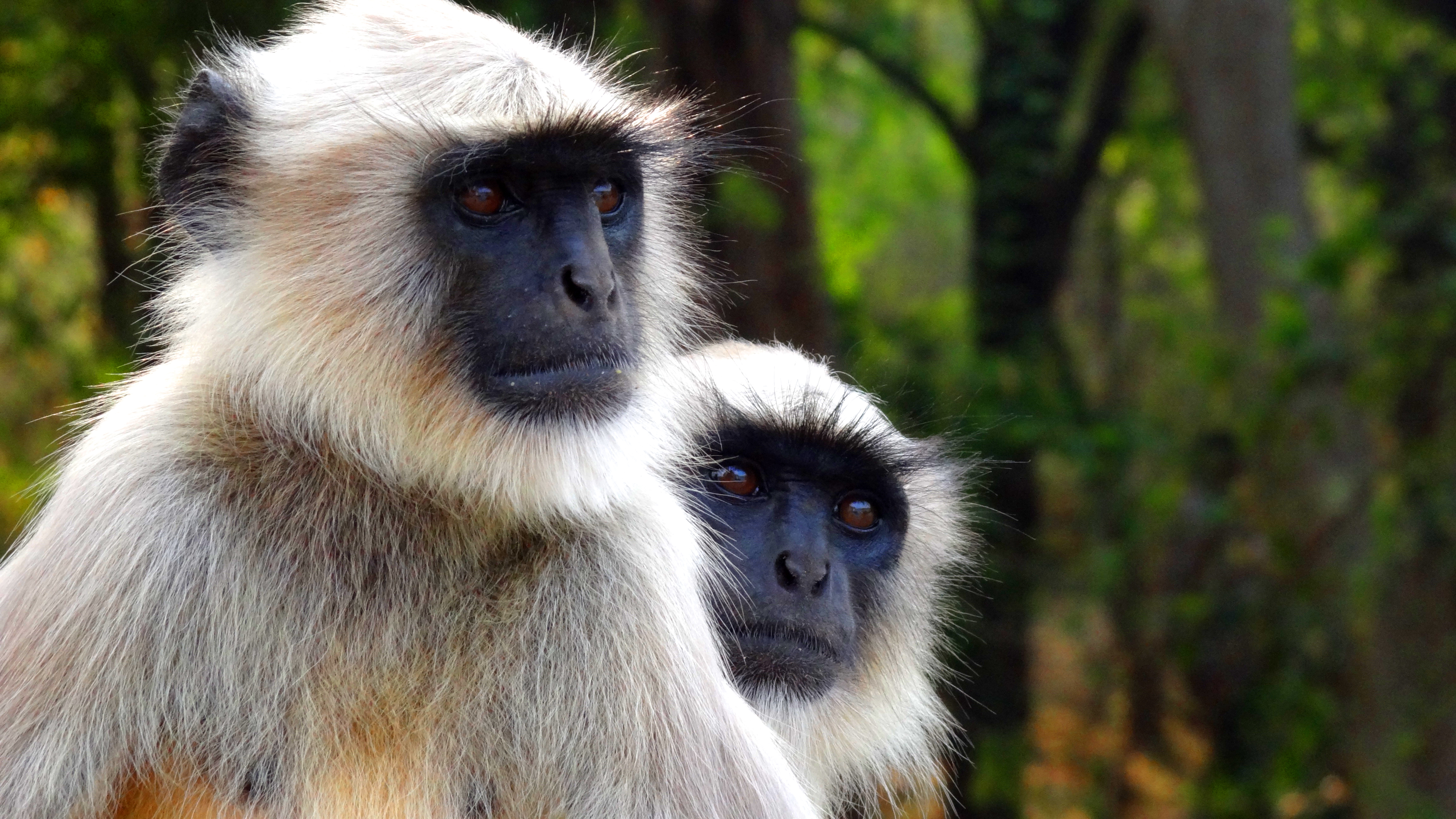
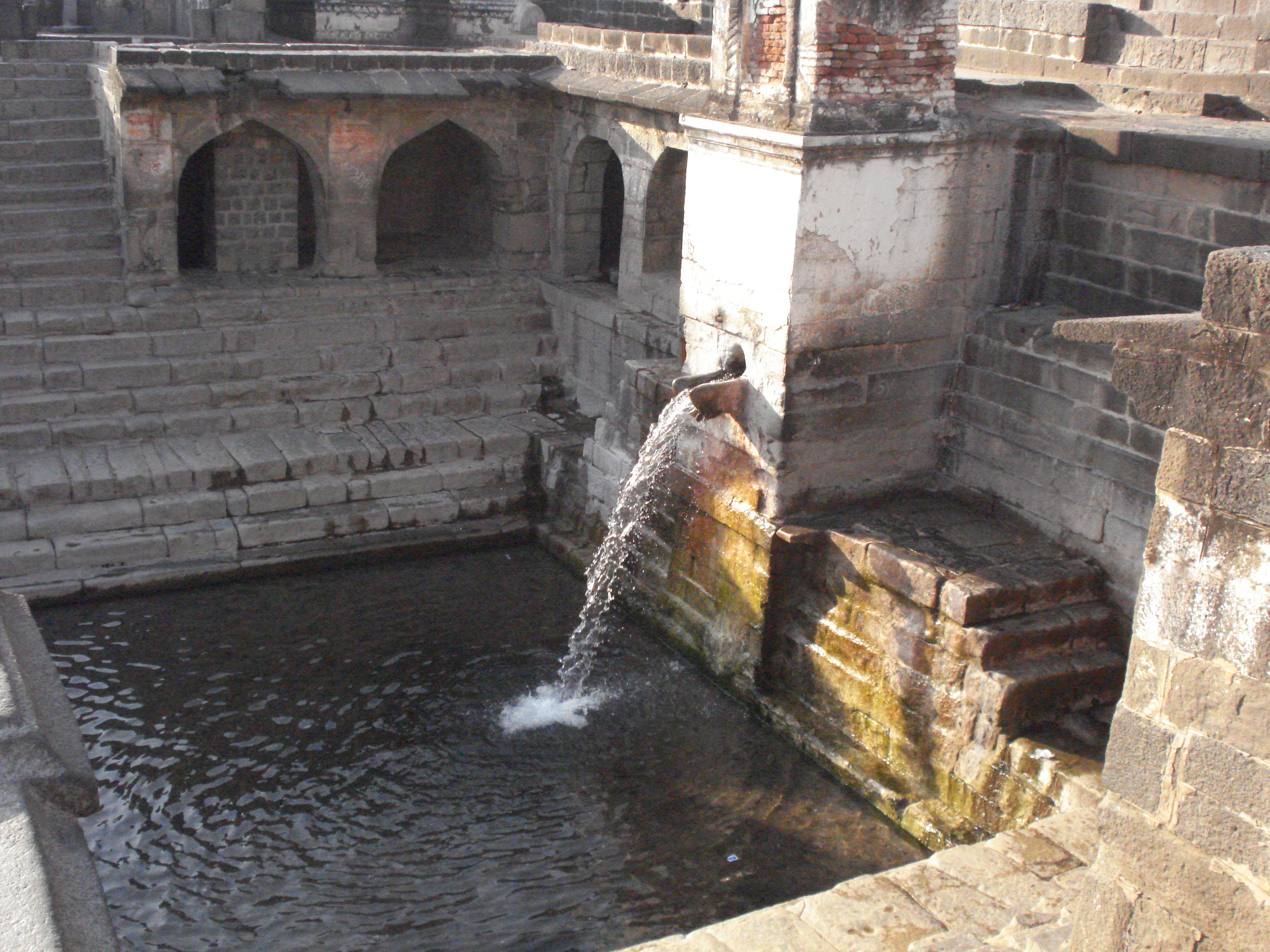
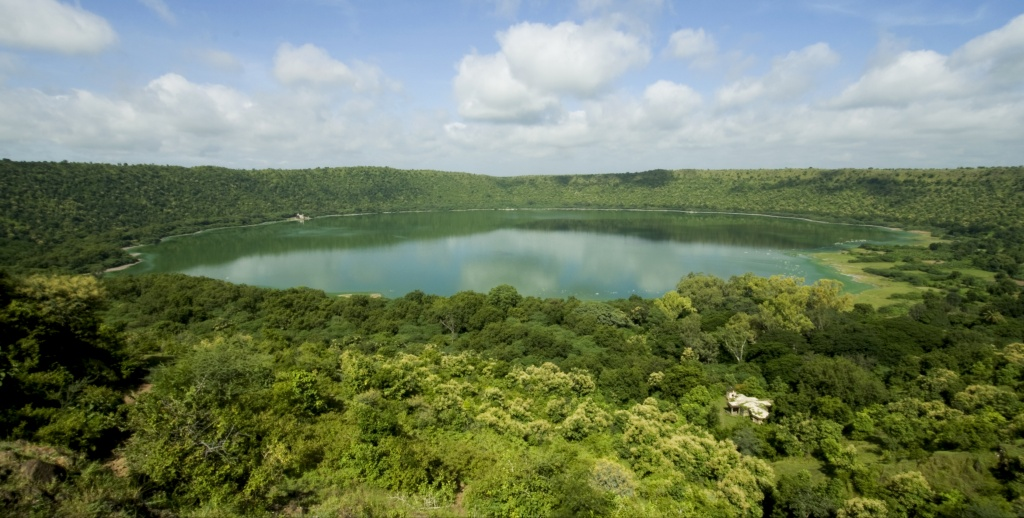
- Clockwise from top: temple of Daitya Sudana, Gaimukha Temple and Tank, Lonar Lake, langurs near Lonar Lake
- Interactive map of Buldhana district
- Coordinates (Buldhana): 20.5°N 76.15°E
- Country: India
- State: Maharashtra
- Division: Amravati
- Headquarters: Buldhana
- Tehsils: Buldhana; Chikhli; Deulgaon Raja; Khamgaon; Shegaon; Malkapur; Motala; Nandura; Mehkar; Lonar; Sindkhed Raja; Jalgaon Jamod; Sangrampur

Government
  - Body: Buldhana Zilla Parishad
  - Guardian Minister: Makrand Jadhav - Patil (Cabinet Minister)
  - President Zilla Parishad: President Mrs. Manisha Pawar; Vice President Mrs. Kamal Budhavat
  - District Collector: Dr. Pravinkumar Devare(IAS)
  - CEO Zilla Parishad: Mr. Gulabrao Kharat (IAS)
  - Superintendent of Police: Nilesh Tambe (IPS)

Area
  - Total: 9,661 km^{2} (3,730 sq mi)

Population (2011)
  - Total: 2,586,258
  - Density: 267.7/km^{2} (693.3/sq mi)

Demographics
  - Literacy: 82.09%
  - Sex ratio: 928
- Time zone: UTC+05:30 (IST)
- Major highways: NH-6; NH-753A
- Average annual precipitation: 946 mm
- Website: buldhana.nic.in

Buldhana district (Marathi pronunciation: [bulɖʰaːɳa]) is located in the Amravati division of Maharashtra, India. It is situated at the western border of Vidarbha region and is 500 km away from the state capital, Mumbai. The district has towns and cities like Deulghat, Dhad, Mehkar, Shegaon, Malkapur, Khamgaon, Lonar and Chikhli. It is surrounded by Madhya Pradesh in the north, Akola, Washim, and Amravati districts on the east, Jalna on the south, and Jalgaon and Aurangabad districts on the west. Khamgaon is the largest city in the district. The district headquarters is Buldhana.

Buldhana district holds religious significance as it is the site of the Shri Gajanan Maharaj Temple, Shegaon. Lonarkar Top (about 923 meters) is highest altitude in Buldhana District placed in Amba Barwa Wildlife Sanctuary.

== Office holders ==
=== Members of Parliament ===
- Prataprao Jadhav (SHS)
  (Buldhana)
- Raksha Khadse (BJP)
  (Raver)

=== Guardian minister ===
Guardian Minister Buldhana
- पालकमंत्री बुलढाणा
- Incumbent; Makrand Jadhav - Patil since 15 Dec 2024
- Style: The Honourable
- Residence: Buldhana
- Appointer: Chief Minister of Maharashtra
- Term length: 5 years / No time limit
- Website: buldhana.gov.in/en/

==== List of Guardian ministers ====
Name	Term of office
Suresh Shetty	7 November 2009 – 10 November 2010
Balasaheb Thorat	11 November 2010 – 26 September 2014
Eknath Khadse	5 December 2014 – 8 November 2019
Rajendra Shingne	9 January 2020 – 29 June 2022
Gulab Raghunath Patil	24 September 2022- 4 October 2023
Dilip Walse Patil	4 October 2023 – 14 December 2024

=== District Magistrate/Collector ===
District Magistrate / Collector Buldhana
- जिल्हाधिकारी तथा जिल्हदंडाधिकरी बुलढाणा
- Emblem of India
- Incumbent; Dr. Pravinkumar Devare (IAS) since April 2026
- Residence: At Buldhana
- Appointer: Government of Maharashtra
- Term length: No time limit
- Website: buldhana.gov.in/en/

==== list of District Magistrate / Collector ====
Name	Term of office
Dr.Kiran Patil (IAS)	January 2024 – April 2026
Dr.Pravinkumar Devare (IAS)	April 2026 – present

== History ==
The name of the district is probably derived from Bhil Thana (place of Bhils, a tribal group).

Buldhana, along with the rest of Berar Province, was part of the Vidarbha kingdom mentioned in the Mahabharata, a Sanskrit epic poem. Berar formed a part of the Maurya Empire during the reign of Ashoka (272–231 BCE). Berar came under the rule of the Satavahana dynasty (2nd century BCE–2nd century CE), the Vakataka dynasty (3rd to 6th centuries), the Chalukya dynasty (6th to 8th centuries), the Rashtrakuta Empire (8th to 10th centuries), the Chalukyas again (10th to 12th centuries), and finally the Yadava dynasty of Devagiri (late 12th to early 14th centuries).

In Rashtrakuta Empire, In Deccan Plateau though not as fertile as Gangetic plains but was rich in minerals. The copper mines of Kadapa, Ballari, Chandrapur, Buldhana, Narsinghpur, Ahmednagar, Bijapur and Dharwad were a source of income and played an important role in the economy of Rashtrakuta Empire

A period of Muslim rule began when Alauddin Khalji, the Sultan of Delhi conquered the region in the early 14th century. The region was part of the Bahmani Kingdom, which broke away from the Delhi Sultanate in the mid-14th century. The Bahmani Sultanate broke up into smaller sultanates at the end of the 15th century. In 1572, Berar became part of the Ahmadnagar Sultanate sultanate, based at Ahmednagar. The Nizam Shahis ceded Berar to the Mughal Empire in 1595. As Mughal rule started to unravel at the start of the 18th century, Asaf Jah I, the Nizam of Hyderabad, seized the southern provinces of the empire in 1724, forming an independent state. Berar was a part of the independent state.

In 1853, the whole district came under the administration of the East India Company. Berar was divided into East and West Berar with Buldhana district being included in West Berar. In 1903, Berar was leased by the Nizam of Hyderabad to the British Raj. Thus, Berar became part of Central Provinces. In 1950, it became part of Madhya Pradesh with Nagpur as its capital. In 1956, along with other Marathi-speaking regions of Vidarbha, it became part of the newly formed state Maharashtra in 1960.

== Administration ==
=== Sub-divisions ===
The district has six revenue sub-divisions headed by a Sub Divisional Officer (SDO): Buldhana, Mehkar, Khamgaon, Malkapur, Jalgaon Jamod, and Sindkhed Raja.

=== Tehsils ===
As of 2010, the district of Buldhana comprises thirteen Tehsil: Buldhana, Chikhli, Deulgaon Raja, Malkapur, Motala, Nandura, Mehkar, Sindkhed Raja, Lonar, Khamgaon, Shegaon, Jalgaon Jamod, and Sangrampur.

=== Education ===
All colleges in Buldhana are affiliated with Sant Gadge Baba Amravati University. One of the schools, Jawahar Navodaya Vidyalaya (JNV) Shegaon, a system of central schools for talented students predominantly from rural areas in India, is located in Shegaon near Chincholi village in Buldhana district.

=== Agriculture ===
The district superintending agriculture officer comes under the Divisional Joint Director of Amravati Division. There are three sub-divisions at Buldhana, Khamgaon, and Mehkar with a taluka agriculture officer posted at each taluka.

There are multiple circles under each taluka. They are Dhad, Shelapur, Dhamangaon, Motala, Shelsur, Amdapur, Chikhli, Dharangaon, Malkapur, Janephal, Mehkar, Bibi, Lonar, Sakharkherda, Sindkhed Raja, Mera Khurd, Deulgaon Mahi, Deulgaon Raja, Ganeshpur, Pimpalgaon Raja (Khamgaon), Nandura, Shegaon, Jalgaon Jamod, Warwat Khanderao, and Sangrampur.

=== Police ===
The district has six police subdivisions and thirty-three police stations.

=== Electricity ===
The distribution of electricity comes under Akola Zone and Buldhana Circle with Buldhana, Khamgaon, and Malkapur Divisions. Each subdivision caters to more nearby talukas and has 33KV distribution substations under them.

=== Irrigation ===
The district comes under Buldhana Irrigation Project Circle along with Akola and Washim district. The circle comes under Vidarbha Irrigation Development Corporation, Nagpur. It has its Major Project division at Shegaon, Khadakpurna at Deulgaon Raja, Mun Project division at Khamgaon, and Minor Irrigation Division at Chikhli and Akola.

The completed irrigation projects are the Nalganga Dam project in Motala and a major project in Vaan River having one-fourth of the benefit accrue to Akola district. Many further irrigation projects are under way or are in the planning stages.

=== Public Works Department ===
The district comes under Amravati Public Works Region and Akola Public Works Circle. It has one Public Works division at Buldhana with subdivision at Buldhana, Chikhli, Mehkar, and Deulgaon Raja; and a second, Khamgaon division, with subdivisions at Khamgaon, Jalgaon Jamod, and Malkapur; plus the Buldhana District Mechanical Subdivision.

There are Road Project subdivisions at Buldhana and Khamgaon under the Road Project Division of Akola. There is a separate Zilla Parishad Works Division at Buldhana with subdivisions at Buldhana, Khamgaon, Mehkar, and Malkapur. The department manages Government Rest houses at Buldhana, Khamgaon, Shegaon, Malkapur, Motala, Jalgaon Jamod, Sangrampur, Chikhli, Amdapur, Lavhala (Mehkar), Mehkar, Dongaon, Deulgaon Raja, Deulgaon Mahi, Sindkhed Raja, Lonar, and Nandura.

=== Politics ===
The district contributes one seat to the Lok Sabha (Lower House), namely Buldhana Lok Sabha constituency. Prataprao Jadhav of Shiv Sena is the current Member of Parliament from Buldhana.

The district has seven seats in the Maharashtra State legislature assembly: Buldhana, Chikhli, Sindkhed Raja, Mehkar, Khamgaon, and Jalgaon Jamod. The seventh seat at Malkapur is part of Raver Lok Sabha constituency in Jalgaon district.

== Demographics ==
Historical population
Year	Pop.	±% p.a.
1901	617,990	—
1911	673,698	+0.87%
1921	703,643	+0.44%
1931	766,584	+0.86%
1941	820,862	+0.69%
1951	870,168	+0.59%
1961	1,059,698	+1.99%
1971	1,262,978	+1.77%
1981	1,508,777	+1.79%
1991	1,886,299	+2.26%
2001	2,232,480	+1.70%
2011	2,586,258	+1.48%

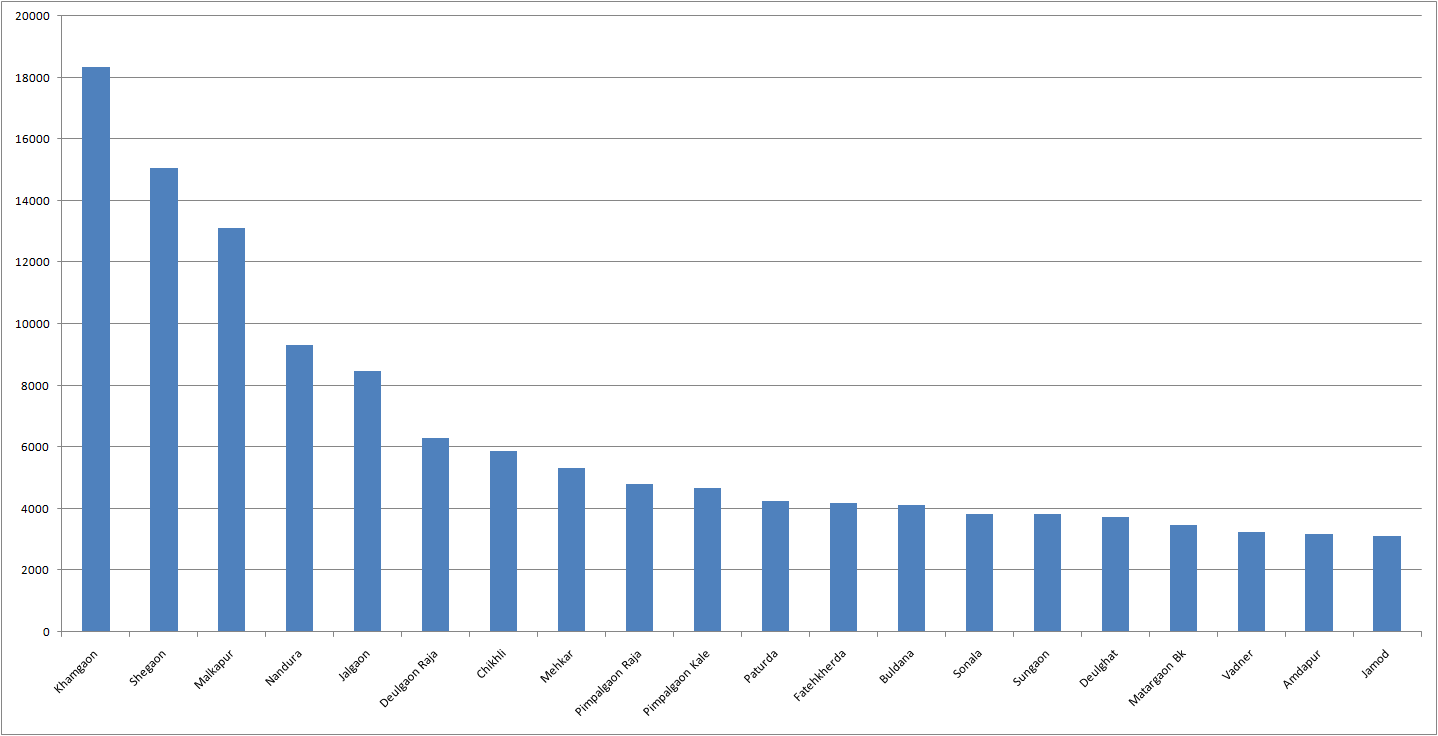
Top 20 most populated places buldhana district 1901 (click to enlarge).

According to the 2011 census Buldhana district has a population of 2,586,258, roughly equal to the nation of Kuwait or the US state of Nevada. This gives it a ranking of 159th in India (out of a total of 640). The district has a population density of 268 inhabitants per square kilometre (690/sq mi). Its population growth rate over the decade 2001-2011 was 15.93%. Buldhana has a sex ratio of 928 females for every 1000 males, and a literacy rate of 82.09%. 21.22% of the population lives in urban areas. Scheduled Castes and Scheduled Tribes make up 18.21% and 4.39% of the population respectively.

=== Religion ===
Religions in Buldhana district (2011)
Religion	Percent
Hinduism	71.35%
Buddhism	14.08%
Islam	13.70%
Jainism	0.47%
Other or not stated	0.40%

Tehsil Name	Hindu	Buddhist	Muslim	Jain	Others
Buldhana	68.91	13.06	16.99	0.59	0.45
Shegaon	69.63	16.81	13.08	0.24	0.24
Khamgaon	65.92	16.40	16.50	0.71	0.47
Malkapur	67.85	10.55	20.14	0.98	0.46
Nandura	70.46	13.94	15.12	0.24	0.24
Jalgaon Jamod	75.24	10.72	13.37	0.15	0.52
Sangrampur	75.02	12.51	11.93	0.01	0.53
Motala	73.17	13.14	13.17	0.21	0.31
Mehkar	75.00	15.03	09.15	0.45	0.37
Chikhli	70.82	14.98	13.53	0.37	0.30
Deulgaon Raja	73.33	14.67	10.54	1.04	0.42
Sindkhed Raja	74.65	16.76	7.94	0.22	0.43
Lonar	77.70	11.64	9.57	0.68	0.41

=== Languages ===
Languages in Buldhana district (2011)
1. Marathi (78.7%)
2. Urdu (11.0%)
3. Hindi (4.41%)
4. Lambadi (2.11%)
5. Others (3.82%)

At the time of the 2011 census of India, 78.67% of the population in the district spoke Marathi, 10.99% Urdu, 4.41% Hindi and 2.11% Lambadi as their first language.

Residents of Buldhana communicate in Marathi language. Nihali language, a language isolate of India, is spoken by some 2,000 people (1991) in Jalgaon Jamod tehsil. Apart from the commonly used Varhadi, a dialect of Marathi language used in the district includes Andh, an Indo-Aryan language spoken by 100,000 people. Hindi and English are also spoken in the region.

== Geography ==
=== Rivers ===
The district lies in the Tapi River and Godavari River basins. Purna River is a tributary of the Tapi River. Nalganga river is a tributary of Purna river. The Painganga and Khadakpurna rivers are tributaries of Godavari River.

Here are the rivers in the district, with their tributaries.

- Purna River
  - Vaan River
  - Mann River
  - Utawali River
  - Nipani River
  - Mas River
  - Bordi River
  - Dnyanganga River
  - Vishwaganga River
  - Nalganga River
- Painganga River
- Kadakpurna River
  - Dhamana River
  - Koradi River
  - Jamvani River
  - Tapi River

== Economy ==
Cotton, sorghum and other cereals, oilseeds, soybean, sunflower, and groundnuts are the predominant crops grown in the district.

Khamgaon and Malkapur are the major cotton trading towns in the district. The district has many minor and medium size irrigation projects. The important ones are Nalganga and Vaan. There are thirteen Agriculture Produce Market Committees-Main Market, one in each tehsil, and there are twenty sub-markets in the districts.

The Indian Council for Agriculture research funded a farm science centre Krishi Vigyan Kendra, Jalgaon Jamod in the district in 1994.

== Culture ==
There is a fair called Chaitra Masa Suklapaksha Navami at Shegaon on Rama Navami in Chaitra (March or April) each year.

Common folk arts are Bhajan (devotional singing), Kirtan (devotional chanting with musical instruments), and Gondhal (a complex art form involving ritual acts, dances, songs, and poems).

== Places of interest ==
=== Lonar Lake ===
Lonar Crater Lake is located in Buldhana district. It is the second largest impact crater in basaltic rock in the world. It was formed 60,000 years ago by a meteor impact. The pH of the water is about 11 (extremely alkaline). Lonar Crater has very different flora and fauna in its vicinity.

Lonar Altitude is on 563 meters.

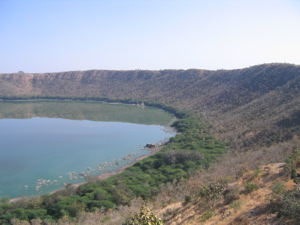
Different side of the crater during non-monsoon days

=== Sant Gajanan Maharaj Temple ===
Gajanan Maharaj from Shegaon, was a saint from India. "Shri Sant Gajanan Maharaj Sansthan", a body of 12 trustees was formed on 12 September 1908 to commemorate the holy place which the saint had hinted about, for Samadhi. Later, a temple was built around his Samadhi/tomb.

This temple has a tourist attraction called "Anand Sagar", an INR 3 billion project completed in 2005. It is maintained by the Gajanan Maharaj Sansthan. It surrounds a big artificial lake. It has a meditation center, an aquarium, temples, playgrounds, lawns and open theatre where fountain-show is conducted for entertainment. It has been decorated with artifacts and carvings. An amusement park has also started with a toy train encircling the entire place.

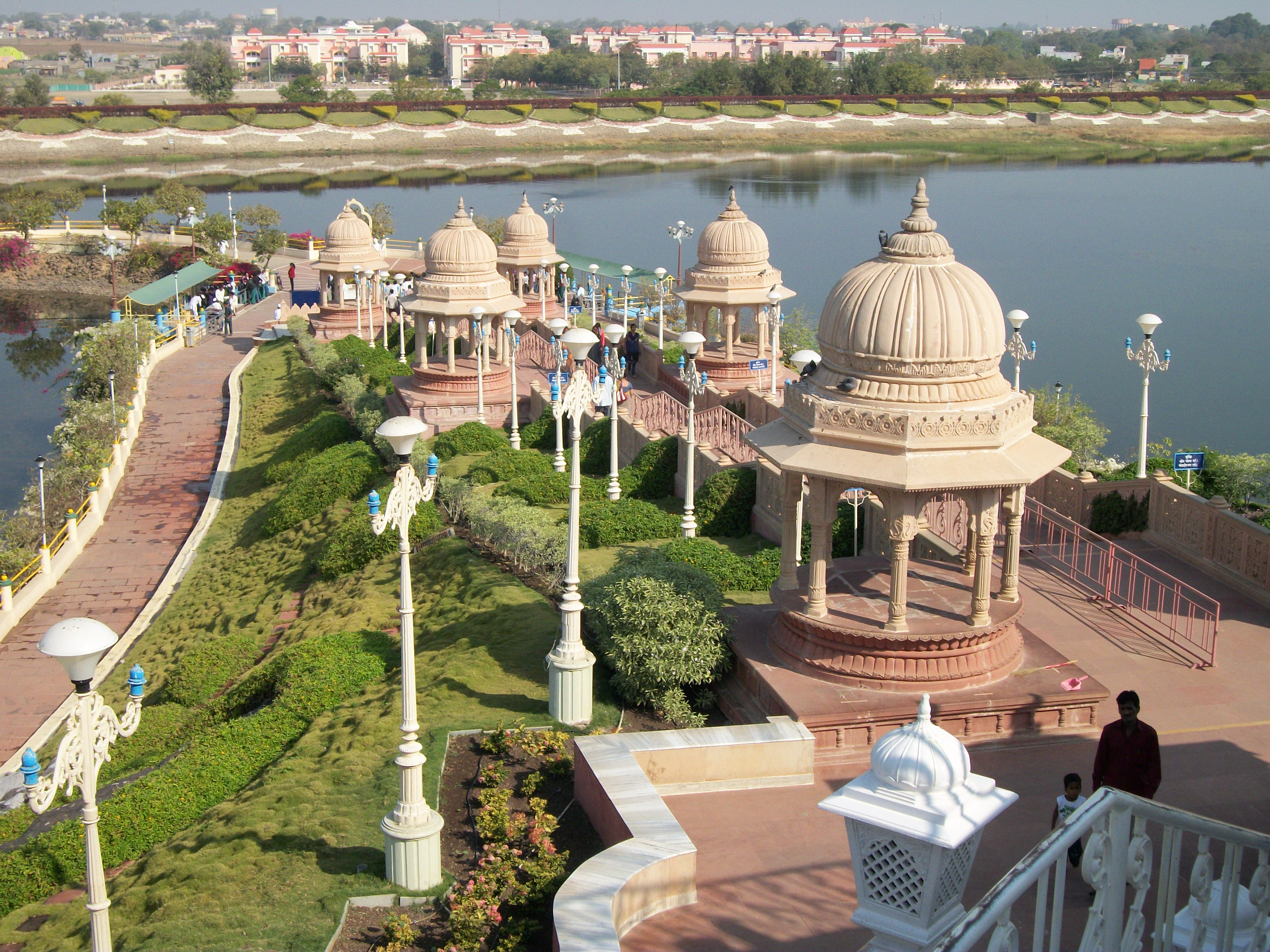
Top view of Anand Sagar and partial artificial lake

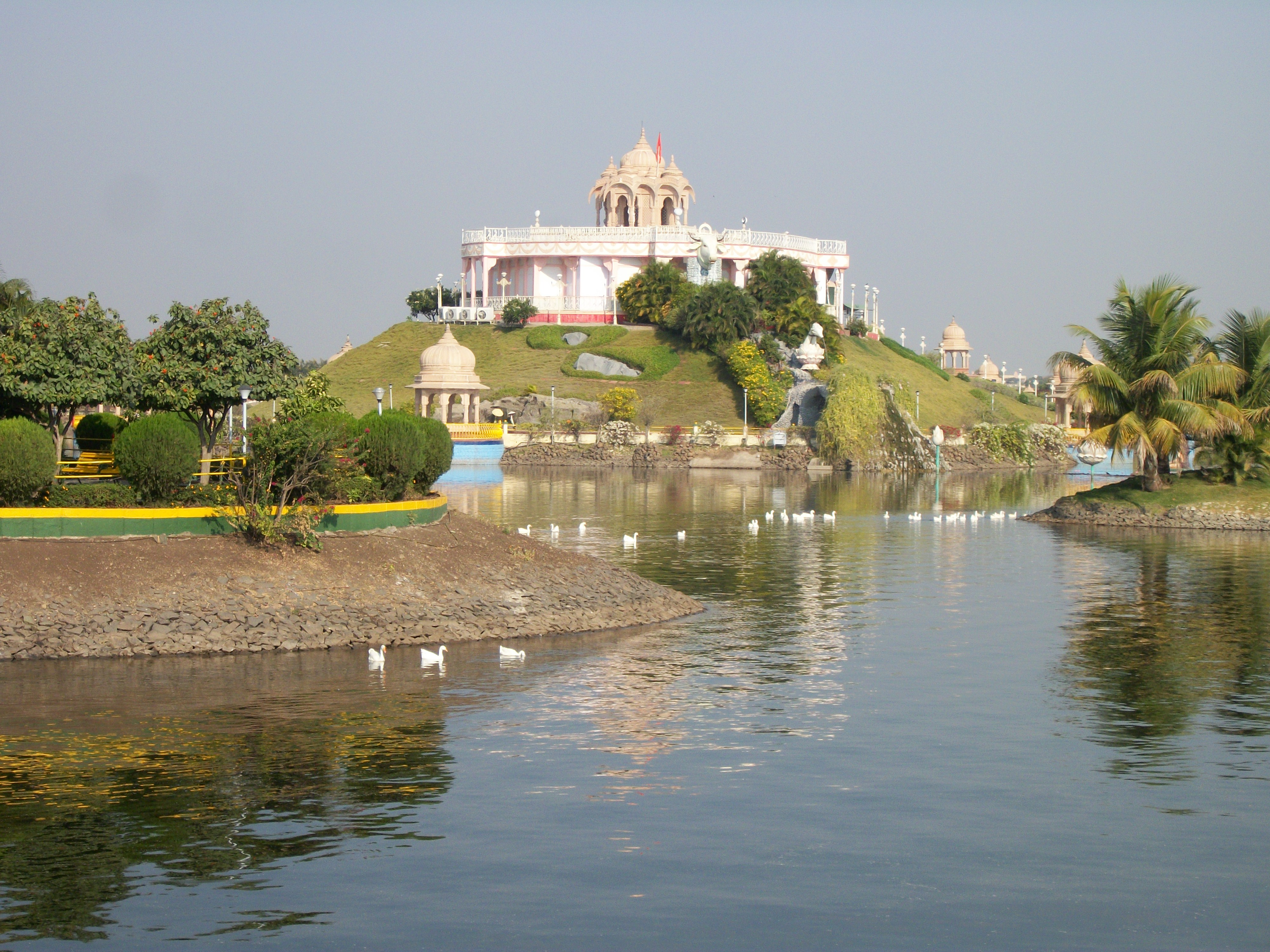
View of Anand Sagar from artificial lake

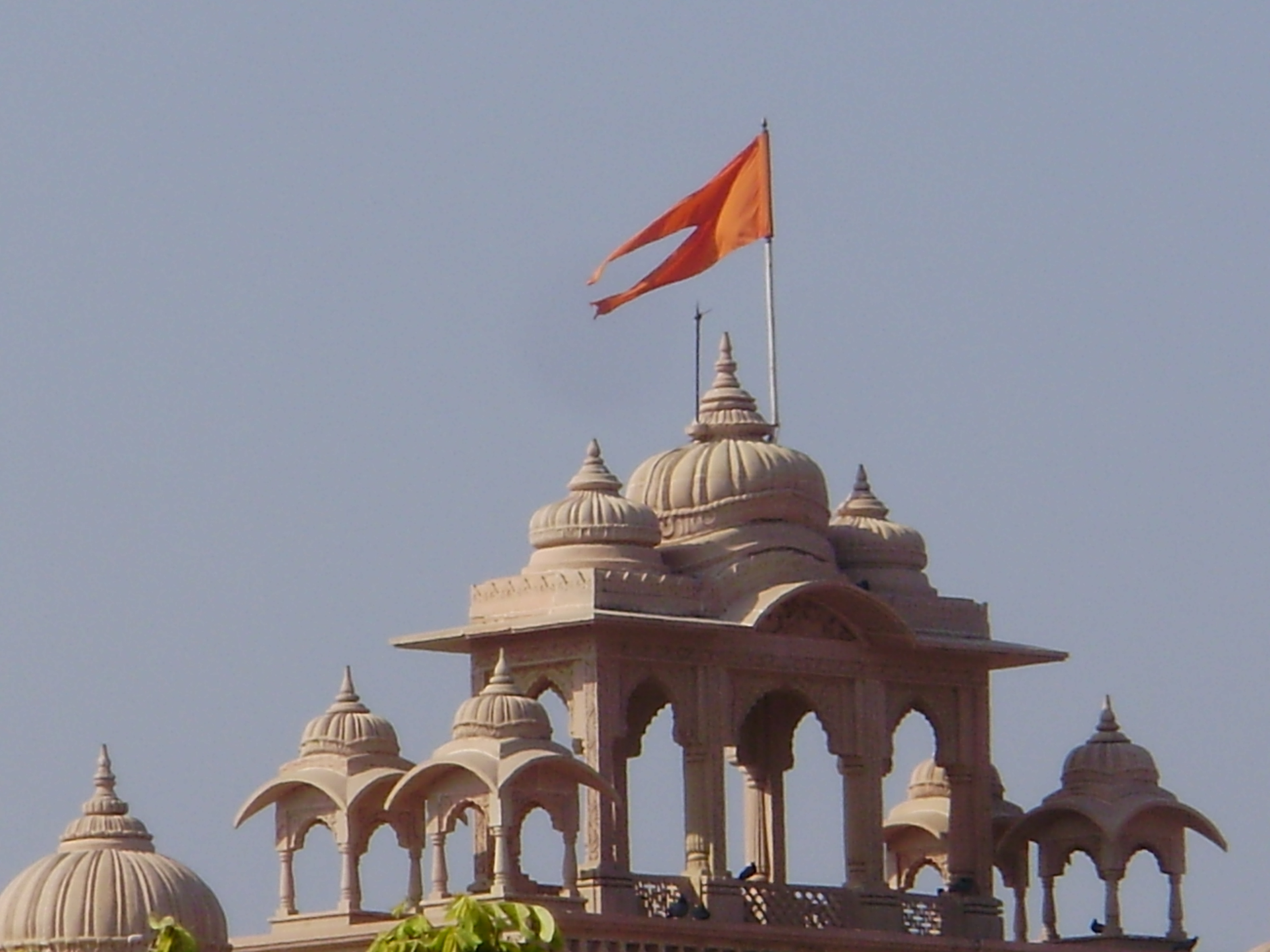
Front view of Anand Sagar

=== Sindkhed Raja ===
Sindkhed Raja is birthplace of Jijabai, mother of Shivaji, the town still has the palace and tomb of Lakhuji Jadhav, father of Jijabai.

=== Pentakali Dam ===
- Pentakali Dam is an earthfill dam on Painganga River near Mehkar, Buldhana district. It is located at 53 km from Buldhana and 21 km from Mehkar.

=== Other ===
- Hemadpanthi temples are located at Mehkar-Sonati, Sindhkhed Raja (Nilkantheshwar)
- Nalganga Dam in Malkapur.
- Dnyanganga Wildlife Sanctuary

== Notable people ==
- Lakhuji Jadhav, Father of Jijabai
- Jijabai, Mother of Shivaji
- Dhanaji Jadhav, Sarsenapati of Maratha Empire, great-greatgrandson of Lakhuji Jadhav
- Gulam Rabbani Khan, Indian Freedom Fighter
- Ram Krishna Khatri, freedom fighter involved in Kakori conspiracy
- Bhavanji Khimji, Freedom Fighter and Politician
- Pandharinath Patil, Social Reformer
- Tarabai Shinde, Feminist Activist
- Shripad Krushna Kolhatkar, Marathi Writer
- Vishnu Bhikaji Kolte, Marathi Writer
- Nagorao Deshpande, Marathi Poet
- Sadanand Deshmukh, Poet, lyricist
- Himmatrao Bawaskar, Physician, Padma Shri awardee
- Akash Fundkar, Cabinet Minister of Ministry of Labour (Maharashtra)
- Prataprao Jadhav, Union Minister
- Pandurang Fundkar, Former Minister
- Rajendra Shingne, Former Minister
- Sanjay Kute, MLA, Former Minister
- Dhiraj Lingade, MLC
- Chainsukh Sancheti, MLA
- Shweta Mahale, MLA
- Sanjay Gaikwad, MLA
- Siddharth Kharat, MLA
- Manoj Kayande, MLA
- Harshwardhan Sapkal, President of Maharashtra Congress Committee
- Dilip Sananda, Ex MLA
- Rajesh Ekade, Ex MLA
- Rahul Bondre, Ex MLA
- Sanjay Raimulkar, Ex MLA
- Shashikant Khedekar, Ex MLA
- Shankarrao Bobdey, ex Rajya Sabha Member
- V. G. Deshpande, Politician
- Daulat Gawai, Politician
- Sukhdev Kale, Politician
- Raju Kendre, Indian Educator, Entrepreneur
- Vanita Borade, Indian Conservationist
- Prathamesh Jawkar, Indian Archer, Gold Medalist 2022 Asian Games
- Shrikant Wagh, Cricketer
- Shubham Kapse, Cricketer
