= Buldhana =

- Nickname: Bhilthana
- Interactive map of Buldhana
- Coordinates: 20°31′58″N 76°10′58″E
- Country: India
- State: Maharashtra
- Region: Vidarbha
- District: Buldhana
- Established: 17 February 1893

Government
  - Type: Municipality
  - Body: Buldhana Municipal Council

Area
  - City: 21 km^{2} (8.1 sq mi)
  - Rank: 2nd in District
- Elevation: 639 m (2,096 ft)

Population (2021)
  - City: 91,000
  - Rank: 2nd in District
  - Density: 4,334/km^{2} (11,230/sq mi)
  - Metro: 152,000

Languages
  - Official: Marathi
- Time zone: UTC+5:30 (IST)
- PIN: 443001
- Vehicle registration: MH-28, MH-56
- Website: buldhana.nic.in

Buldhana (Marathi pronunciation: Bulḍhānā) is a city and a Municipal Council in the Indian state of Maharashtra, established on 17 February 1893. It is the administrative headquarters of Buldhana District in the Amravati Division. Buldhana is the second-largest city in the district after Khamgaon, and is known as a small hill station due to its location in the mountainous Ajanta range. The city is about 552 km from the state capital, Mumbai.

Buldhana is home to several historical and tourist sites, such as the Balaji Temple in Rajur Ghat, a replica of the famous Venkateswara Temple, Tirumala. Another significant religious site is the Shri Gajanan Maharaj Temple in Shegaon, around 75 km away. The world-famous Lonar Lake, a National Geo-heritage monument created by a meteorite impact, is located about 100 km from the city. The birthplace of Jijabai, Sindkhed Raja, is 90 km away, and the Sailani Baba Dargah, a major attraction, is just 25 km from the city. The World Heritage Site Ajanta Caves is 55 km away, and the Dnyanganga Wildlife Sanctuary is only 20 km from the Buldhana.

== Demographics ==
As of the 2011 India census, Buldhana had a population of 67,431. Males constitute 52% of the population and females 48%. Buldhana has an average literacy rate of 82%, higher than the national average of 59.5%, with male literacy at 82% and female literacy at 72%. 13% of the population is under six years of age.

Religion in Buldhana (2011)
Religion	Percent
Hinduism	59.14%
Islam	24.76%
Buddhism	13.78%
Jainism	1.52%
Others	0.81%

== Climate ==
Climate data for Buldhana (1991–2020)
Month	Jan	Feb	Mar	Apr	May	Jun	Jul	Aug	Sep	Oct	Nov	Dec	Year
Record high °C (°F)	35.8 (96.4)	37.8 (100.0)	41.0 (105.8)	44.0 (111.2)	44.2 (111.6)	42.4 (108.3)	35.5 (95.9)	35.0 (95.0)	36.0 (96.8)	35.8 (96.4)	39.5 (103.1)	34.0 (93.2)	44.2 (111.6)
Mean daily maximum °C (°F)	27.9 (82.2)	30.7 (87.3)	34.6 (94.3)	38.1 (100.6)	39.0 (102.2)	34.6 (94.3)	29.3 (84.7)	27.8 (82.0)	29.2 (84.6)	30.7 (87.3)	29.6 (85.3)	28.1 (82.6)	31.6 (88.9)
Mean daily minimum °C (°F)	14.6 (58.3)	17.1 (62.8)	21.0 (69.8)	25.2 (77.4)	26.0 (78.8)	24.0 (75.2)	22.2 (72.0)	21.4 (70.5)	21.6 (70.9)	20.2 (68.4)	17.4 (63.3)	14.7 (58.5)	20.4 (68.7)
Record low °C (°F)	5.0 (41.0)	4.4 (39.9)	11.2 (52.2)	15.9 (60.6)	15.1 (59.2)	17.5 (63.5)	14.2 (57.6)	16.4 (61.5)	15.0 (59.0)	13.4 (56.1)	11.0 (51.8)	5.9 (42.6)	4.4 (39.9)
Average rainfall mm (inches)	5.3 (0.21)	5.6 (0.22)	16.3 (0.64)	3.2 (0.13)	10.4 (0.41)	156.5 (6.16)	210.7 (8.30)	226.2 (8.91)	149.3 (5.88)	67.1 (2.64)	21.7 (0.85)	4.9 (0.19)	877.2 (34.54)
Average rainy days	0.4	0.5	0.8	0.7	0.9	7.8	12.6	12.1	7.8	3.0	1.2	0.2	48.0
Average relative humidity (%) (at 17:30 IST)	38	29	24	22	25	50	71	76	68	53	43	39	45
Source: India Meteorological Department
