= Dhala impact structure =

Impact structure in India

Coordinates: 25°18′N 78°8′E

- tapkeshwar pahadi
- Location within India
- Location: Bhonti village, Shivpuri district, Madhya Pradesh, India

Impact crater structure
- Confidence: Confirmed
- Diameter: 3–11 kilometres (1.9–6.8 mi)
- Age: 2.44 and 2.24 Ga

The Dhala impact structure (N25°17'59.7" and E78°8'3.1") is an impact structure formed by an asteroid impact. It is situated near Bhonti village in Pichhore block of Shivpuri district of Madhya Pradesh state in India. It is the largest impact structure in India, and between the Mediterranean and Southeast Asia. The diameter of the structure is estimated at 3 kilometres (1.9 mi), while other sources estimate its diameter to be 11 km diameter. It is the second such structure found in India, after Lonar lake.

It is 200 km east of the Ramgarh crater.

== Impact date ==
It is estimated that the impact occurred between 2.44 and 2.24 Ga. Basement rocks are predominantly composed of granitoids.

== Largest in India ==
This impact structure on the Bundelkhand craton is the largest in India.

== See also ==
Impact craters in India

- Lonar crater at Lonar in Buldhana district of Maharashtra
- Luna crater at Kutch district of Gujarat
- Ramgarh crater in Rajasthan
- Shiva crater, a proposed undersea crater west of India

Other related topics

- List of impact craters on Earth
- List of possible impact structures on Earth
- List of lakes in India
- List of national parks of India
- Ramsar Convention
- Soda lake
- Tiger reserves of Maharashtra
