= Luna crater =

Impact crater in Luna, Gujarat, India

Coordinates: 23°42′17″N 69°15′37″E

- Location within India
- Location: Luna village in Bhuj taluka, Kutch district, Gujarat, India

Impact crater structure
- Diameter: 1.2 kilometres (3/4 mi)

The Luna crater or Luna structure is an impact crater at Luna village in Bhuj taluka of Kutch district of Gujarat, India. The crater is located in a low-lying, soft, flat area and appears unconventional and deceptive when compared to other craters in India, which are usually found on hard, rocky surfaces.

The structure is the result of the largest iron bolide of the last 10,000 years or even 50,000 years.

== Description ==
Rock fragments and glasslike materials found at the site indicate a meteorite impact, the date of which has tentatively been put at around 2000 BCE. The crater, located in the Rann of Kutch, is circular, with a diameter of 1.2 kilometres (3/4 mi), and its lowest point is only about 2 metres (6.6 ft) above sea level.

The crater is visibly a kilometre wide, but the satellite radar imagery shows it is spread over a five-kilometre radius. Since it lacks the characteristics of a typical impact site, it is a unique site in the world – it has a very low depth-to-diameter ratio. A round lake 1 square kilometre in area and 2 meters in depth lies in the centre of the crater, which remains dry during the summer. The depression is covered with thick vegetation of thorny Acacia species (Acacia nilotica and Prosopis juliflora). The rim, with upturned beds and shatter cone, has no hard rocks. X-ray analysis of the materials adhering to meteorite fragments revealed stishovite and coesite, the high-pressure polymorphs of silica, which confirms the impact origin of the crater.

Among the various evidence expected at an impact site, dark, heavy, magnetic fragments, like metallic meteorites, with spherical cavities are found at the rim of the structure, and glassy objects comparable to tektites have been recovered.

== Religious significance ==
The Luna Dham Temple lies at the north end of the crater.

== More potential craters in Kutch ==
The satellite data indicate that there could be a few more craters within the Kutch, which are hidden by subsequent denudational activities.

== See also ==
Impact craters in India

- Dhala crater in Shivpuri district of Madhya Pradesh
- Lonar crater at Lonar in Buldhana district of Maharashtra
- Ramgarh Crater in Mangrol tehsil of Baran district of Rajasthan
- Shiva crater, an undersea super crater west of India

Other related topics

- List of impact craters on Earth
- List of possible impact structures on Earth
- List of lakes in India
- List of national parks of India
- Ramsar Convention
- Soda lake
