= Vidarbha =

Eastern Region of State of Maharashtra

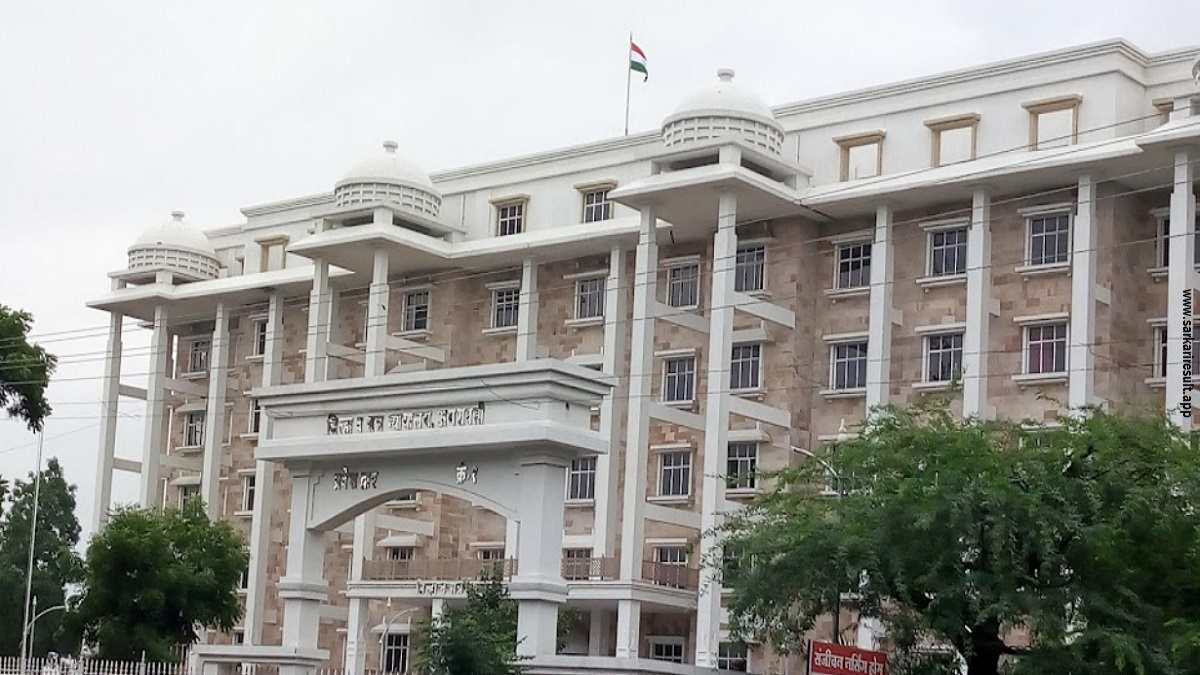
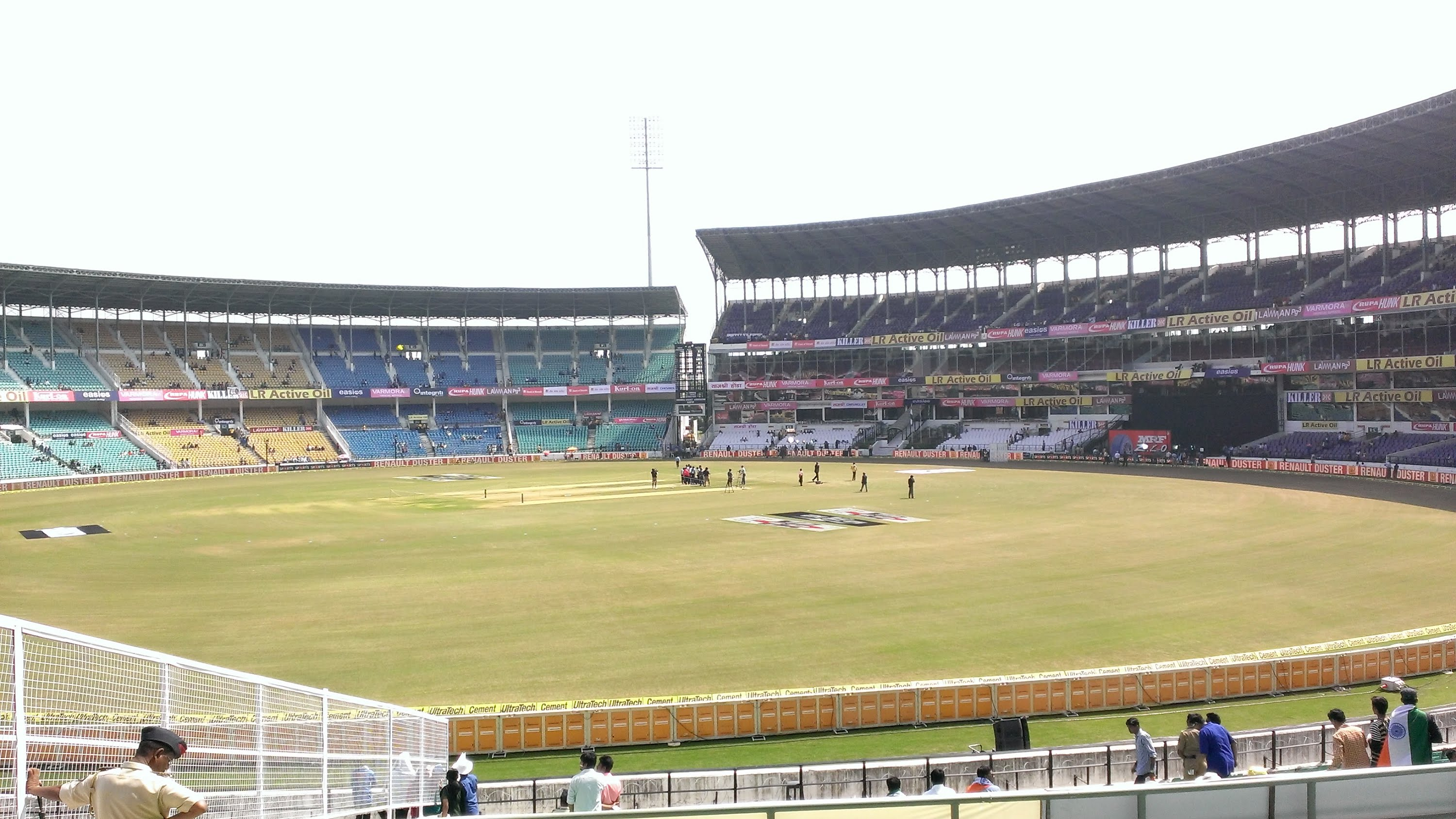
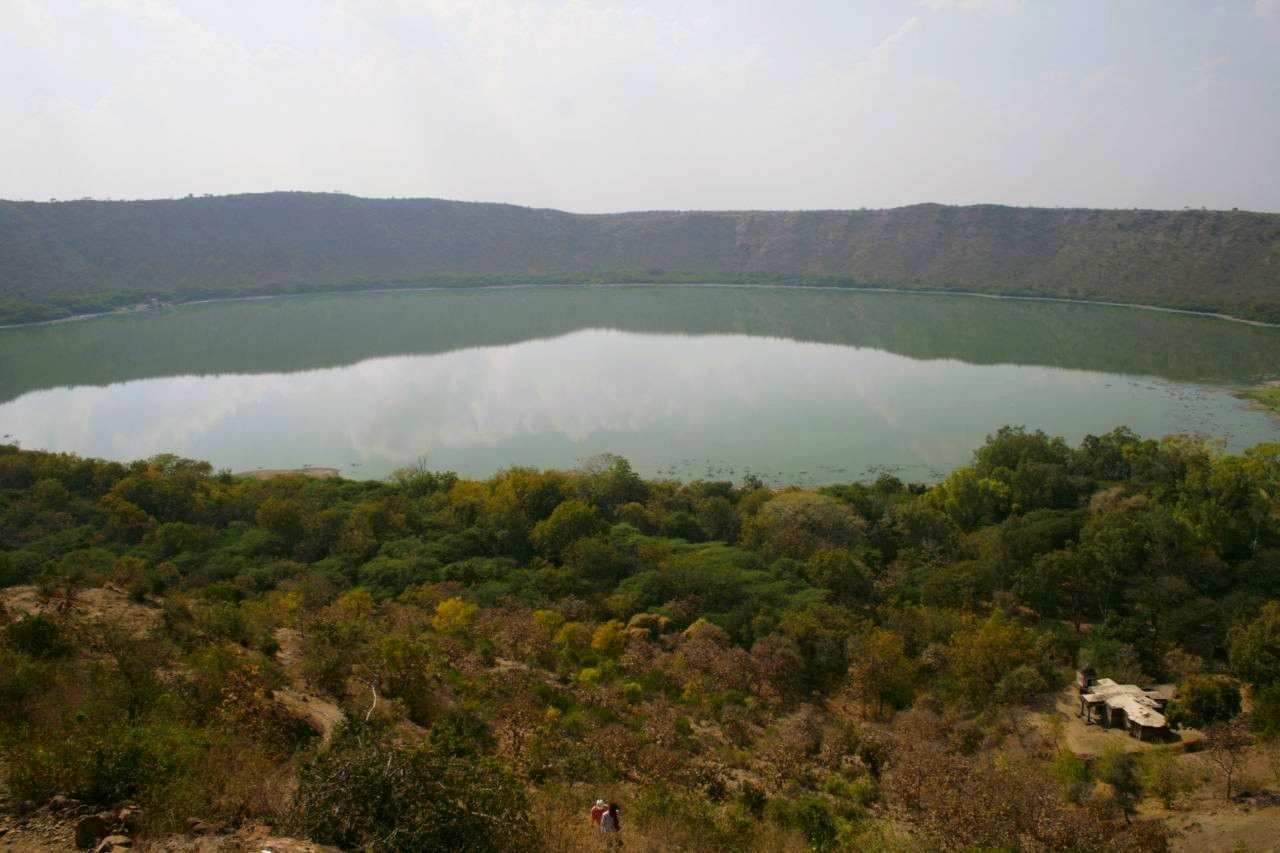
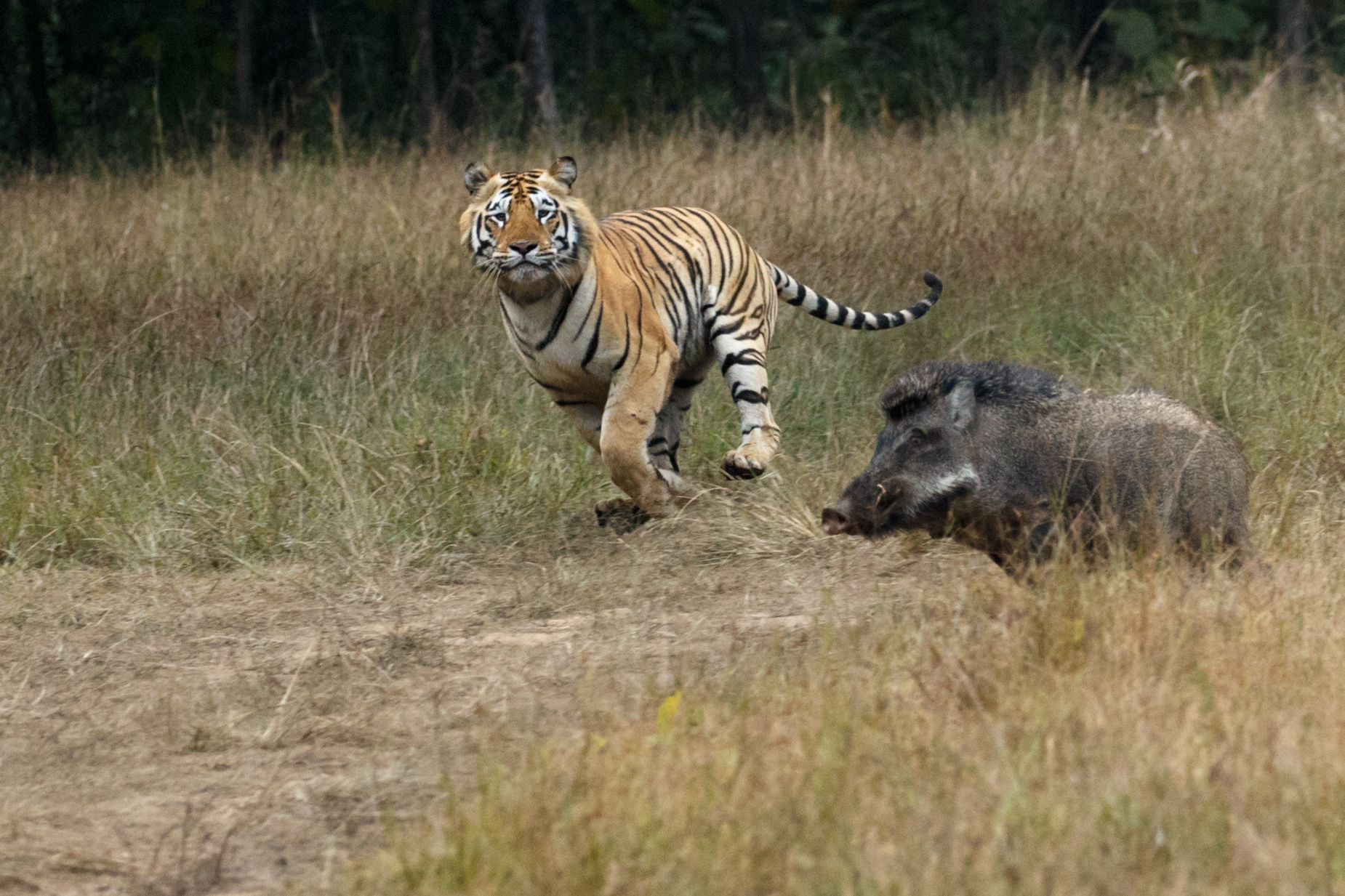
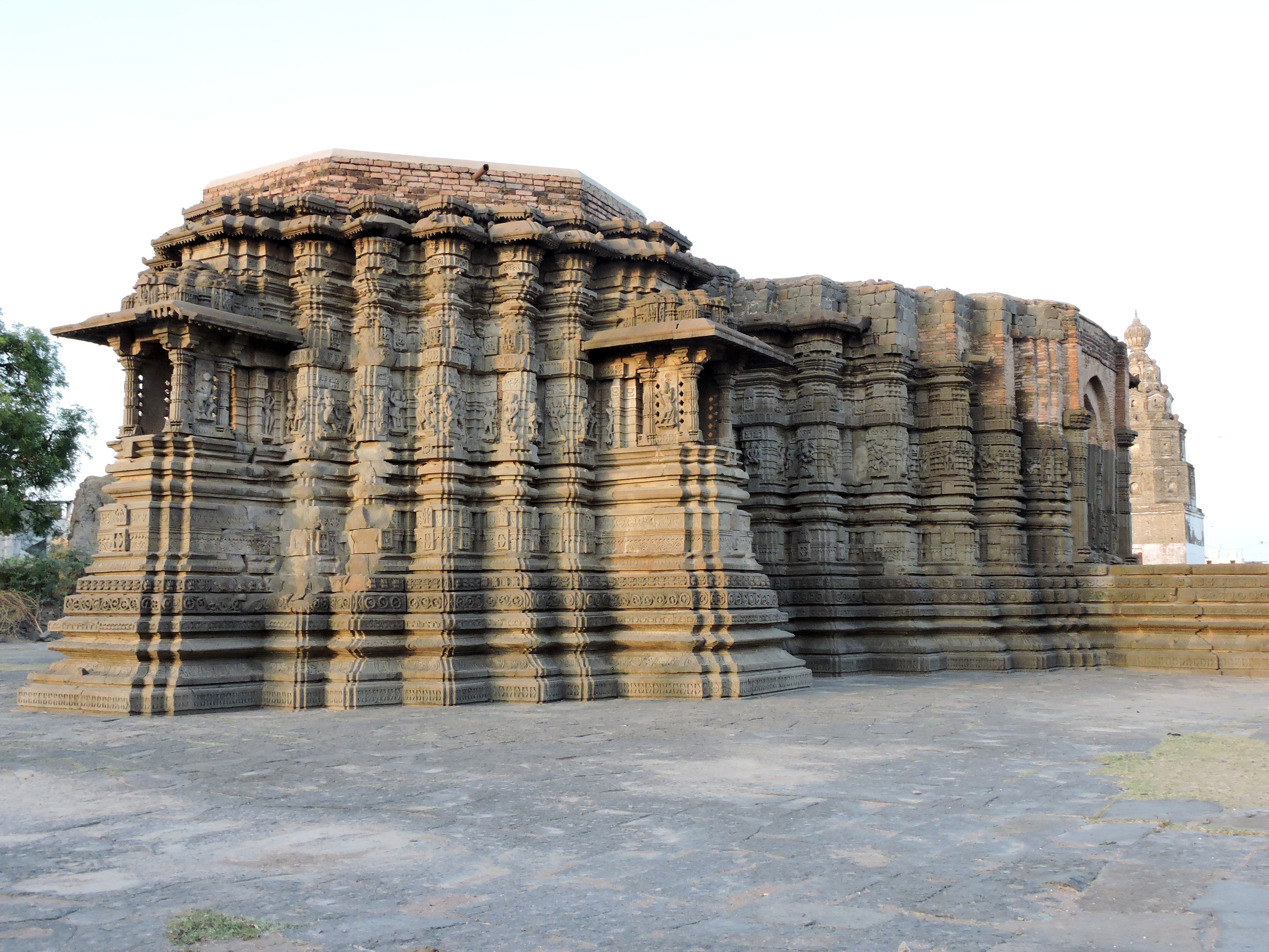
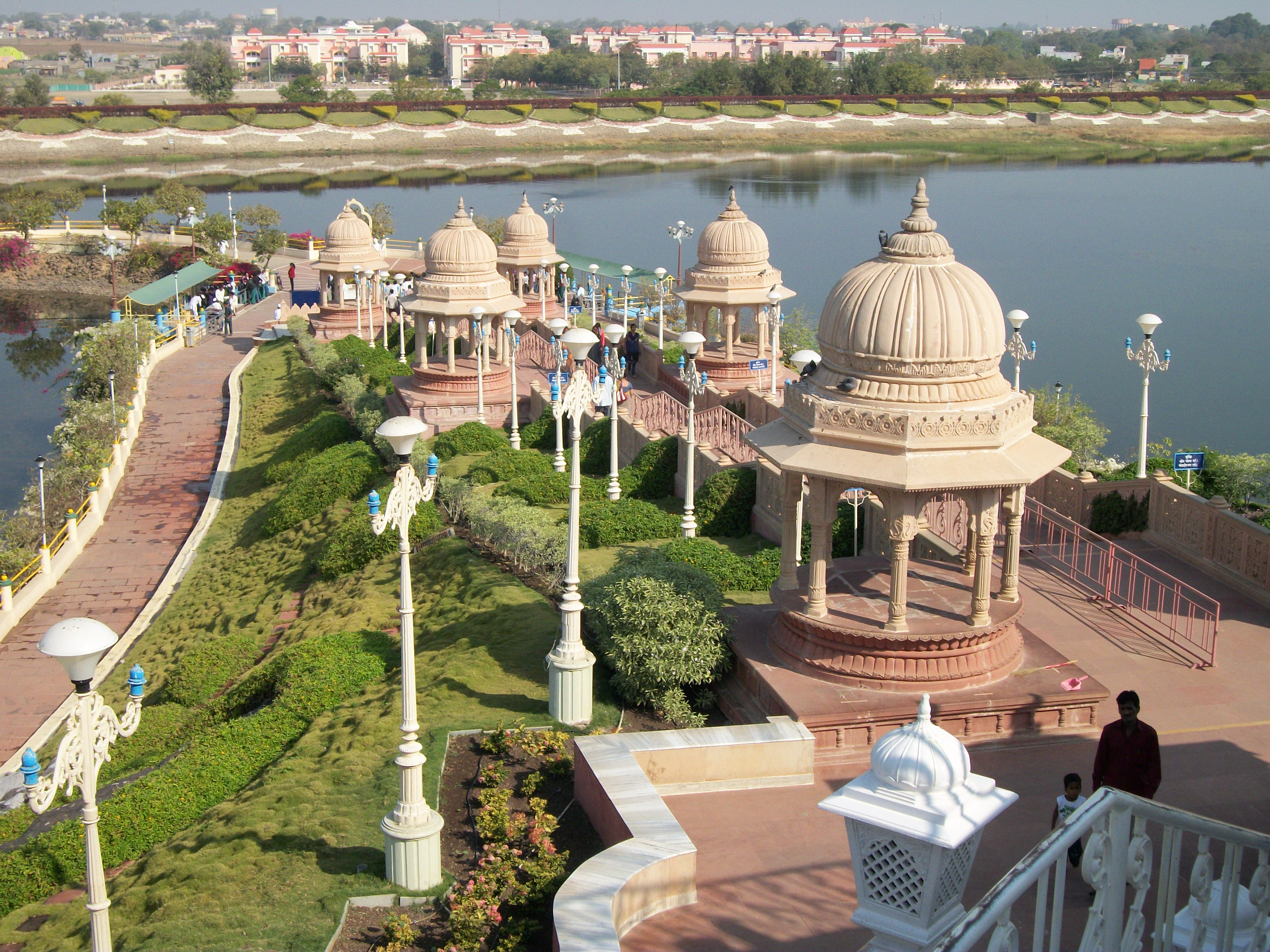
- Clockwise from top left: Court in Amravati, Vidarbha Cricket Association Stadium, Tadoba Andhari Tiger Reserve, Anand Sagar, Daitya Sudan Temple, and Lonar Lake

- Country: India
- State: Maharashtra
- District(s): Akola, Amravati, Bhandara, Buldhana, Chandrapur, Gadchiroli, Gondia, Nagpur, Wardha, Washim, Yavatmal
- Largest city: Nagpur

Population (2011)
  - Total: 23,003,179
- Time zone: Indian Standard Time

Vidarbha (Pronunciation: [ʋid̪əɾbʱə]) is a geographical region in the state of Maharashtra, located in the eastern part of the state. Forming the eastern part of the state, it comprises Amravati and Nagpur divisions. As per the 2011 Census, the region had a population of 23,003,179. The region occupies 31.6% of the total area and is home to 21.3% of the total population of Maharashtra. Situated in central India, it borders the state of Madhya Pradesh to the north, Chhattisgarh to the east, Telangana to the south and Marathwada and Uttar Maharashtra regions of Maharashtra to the west.

According to the Hindu epic Mahabharata, Rukmini, the wife of lord Krishna, was born to Bhishmaka, the king of the Vidarbha kingdom. Vidarbha was part of the Satavahana Empire during 1st to 2nd century CE). The coins and inscriptions from the period of Paramara king Jagadeva, the son of the Udayaditya (reigned c. 1060–1086) have been found in the northern parts the region. According to the Ain-i-Akbari, the region was part of Berar Subah, in the Medieval period. In 1680, the region was captured by Sambhaji, the son of Shivaji, who was the founder of Maratha Empire. In 1724, Asaf Jah, who later became the Nizam of Hyderabad, declared independence and brought most of the region under his nominal rule. The administration and right of collecting taxes were held by the Marathas. In 1803, following the defeat of the Marathas, the region came under the rule of British East India Company. Later, the British Empire took control of the region from the British East India Company in 1857, and the region was part of Berar and Central Provinces. After Indian Independence in 1947, the region remained a part of the Central Provinces and Berar. After the Re-organization of Indian states, majority of the region became part of Bombay State in 1957. After the bifurcation of Bombay State, into Gujarat and Maharashtra, the region became part of Maharashtra.

The GDP of the region is estimated to be ₹6,957.9 billion (equivalent to ₹7.2 trillion or US$77 billion in 2026) 2024-25. The economy of the region is largely dependent on agriculture with oranges and cotton being the major crops. The region also holds considerable mineral resources and forest cover. The region is economically under developed compared to the rest of Maharashtra with considerable poverty and malnutrition. Agriculture is largely dependent on seasonal monsoons and the region receives very less rainfall due to its location in the rain shadow region of the Western Ghats. Droughts and famines are common with more than 1.4 lakh farmer suicides in the period 1997 to 2006.

The largest and major city in the region is Nagpur and other major towns include Amravati, Akola, Chandrapur, Yavatmal and Gondia. Varhadi and Zadi dialects of Marathi is widely spoken. There have been demands for a separate state of Vidarbha, due to perceived neglect from the Government of Maharashtra. While the demand is supported by major political parties BJP and Congress, it is opposed by Shiv Sena, one of the major regional political parties in the state.

== History ==
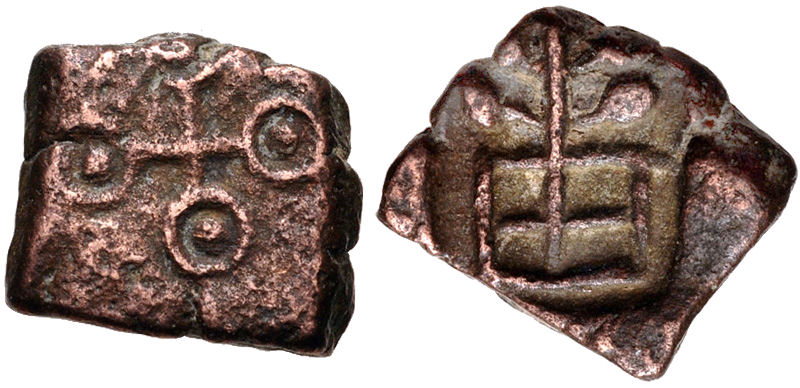
Coin of the Vidarbhas of the Deccan (1st century BCE)

According to the Hindu epic Mahabharata and other Puranic scriptures, princess Rukmini considered to be an incarnation of the goddess Lakshmi and the wife of lord Krishna, was born to Bhishmaka, the king of the Vidarbha kingdom. Vidarbha was part of the Satavahana Empire during 1st to 2nd century CE), ascertained by the Satavahana coins found in Pauni.

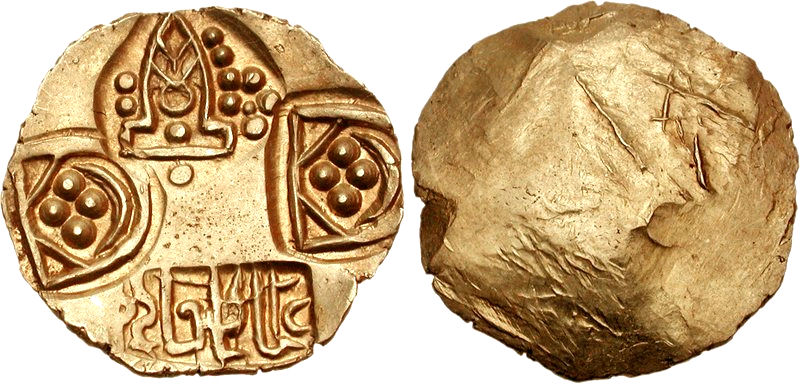
Coin of King Jagadeva of the Paramaras of Vidarbha, 12th–13th centuries CE

The coins and inscriptions from the period of Paramara king Jagadeva have been found in the northern parts the region. An inscription discovered at Jainad names Jagadeva as the son of the Paramara king Udayaditya (reigned c. 1060–1086). Scholar M. H. Krishna argued that the Chalukya king Someshvara was known by the title "Jagadeva" ("Lord of the world") in the northern part of his kingdom, and it was he who issued these coins. However, all the known Chalukya coins featured Kannada script, while the coins of Jagadeva featured the Nagari script used by the Paramaras.

According to the Ain-i-Akbari, the region was part of Berar Subah, known as the Gulshan-e-Berar in the Medieval period. In 1680, the region was captured by Sambhaji, the son of Shivaji who was the founder of Maratha Empire. In 1724, following a battle at Buldana, Asaf Jah defeated the Mughal governor and declared independence. Most of the region came under the nominal rule of Jah, who later became the Nizam of Hyderabad, though the administration and right of collecting chauth were held by the Marathas. In 1803, following the defeat of the Marathas, the region came under the rule of British East India Company.

Later, the British Empire took control of the region from the British East India Company in 1857. After Indian Independence in 1947, the region was part of the Bombay State. After the States Reorganisation Act, which re-organized state boundaries, majority of the region became part of Maharashtra.

== Geography ==
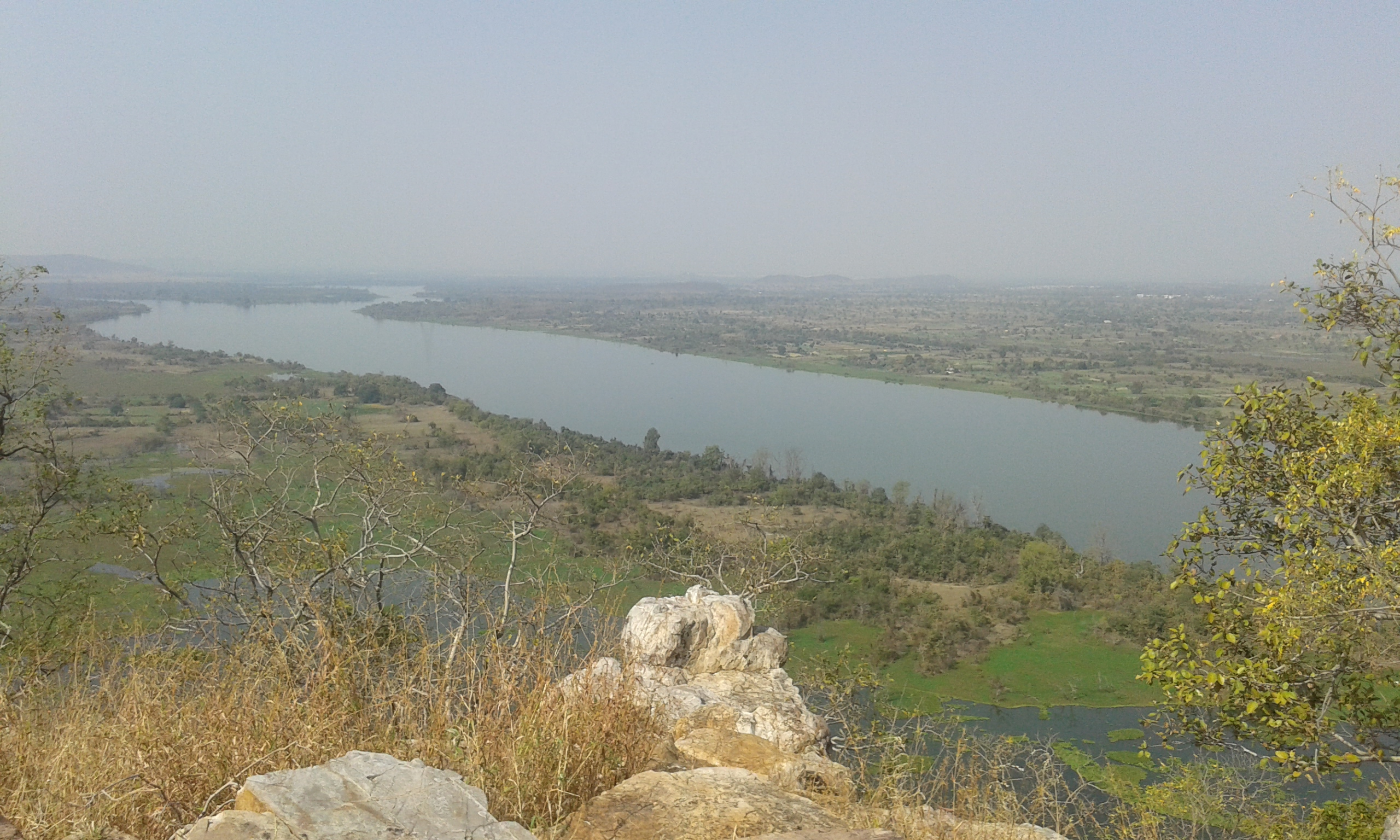
Wainganga river

Vidarbha lies in Central India on the northern part of the Deccan Plateau. It borders the state of Madhya Pradesh to the north, Chhattisgarh to the east, Telangana to the south and Marathwada and Uttar Maharashtra regions of Maharashtra to the west. It lies in the rain shadow region of the Western Ghats and the terrain is largely flat. The Satpura Range lies to the north of Vidarbha region with Melghat in Amravati district forming part of the southern offshoot of the Satpura Range. Large basaltic rock formations exists throughout the region, part of the 66-million-year-old volcanic Deccan Traps. Bhandara and Gondia district are entirely occupied by metamorphic rock and alluvium, making their geology unique in Maharashtra. The Poorna river basin lies in Western Vidarbha and comprises Akola, Amaravati and Buldhana districts. The region has extremely high innate soil and water salinity.

== Administration ==
Vidarbha has 11 districts divided into two divisions: Amravati (earlier Berar) and Nagpur divisions.

Division	Headquarters	Districts	Tehsils
Amravati	Amravati	Akola; Amravati; Buldhana; Washim; Yavatmal	56
Nagpur	Nagpur	Bhandara; Chandrapur; Gadchiroli; Gondia; Nagpur; Wardha	64

Each district has a collector's office which is responsible for day-to-day administration. The District Collector is a Central Indian Government IAS appointee who is in charge of the governance of a district in a state.

== Demographics ==
Vidarbha has a total population of 23,003,179 according to the 2011 India census. The region occupies 31.6% of the total area and is home to 21.3% of the total population of Maharashtra. According to the 2011 census, Hinduism was the principal religion in the state at 76.91% of the total population, while Buddhists constituted 13.08 of the total population. Vidarbha accounts for 45.91% of total Buddhists in Maharashtra.

Religion in Vidarbha (2011 census)
City	Population
Hinduism	76.91
Buddhism	13.08
Islam	8.34
Jainism	0.44
Christianity	0.34
Sikhism	0.18
Others/Non religious	0.72

Languages of Vidarbha (2011)
City	Population
Marathi	73.72
Hindi	8.30
Urdu	6.23
Lambadi	2.58
Gondi	1.83
Korku	1.10
Telugu	1.02
others	5.22

District	Male	Female	Total
Akola	936,226	882,391	1,818,617
Amravati	1,482,845	1,404,981	2,887,826
Bhandara	604,371	594,439	1,198,810
Buldhana	1,342,152	1,245,887	2,588,039
Chandrapur	1,120,316	1,073,946	2,194,262
Gadchiroli	542,813	528,982	1,071,795
Gondia	662,524	659,807	1,322,331
Nagpur	2,388,558	2,264,613	4,653,171
Wardha	665,925	630,232	1,296,157
Washim	621,228	575,486	1,196,714
Yavatmal	1,425,593	1,349,864	2,775,457

The largest city in the region is Nagpur and other major cities include Amravati, Akola, Chandrapur, Yavatmal and Gondia.

== Language and culture ==
As per the 2011 census, 73.72% of the population speaks Marathi, 8.30% Hindi, 6.23% Urdu, 2.58% Lambadi, 1.83% Gondi, 1.10% Korku, 1.02% Telugu and around 1% Powari their first language. Varhadi and Zadi dialects of Marathi are widely spoken.

Hindu festivals like Holi, Diwali and Dasara are celebrated throughout the region.

The Nagpur Central Museum (est. 1863) maintains collections from the region.

== Economy ==
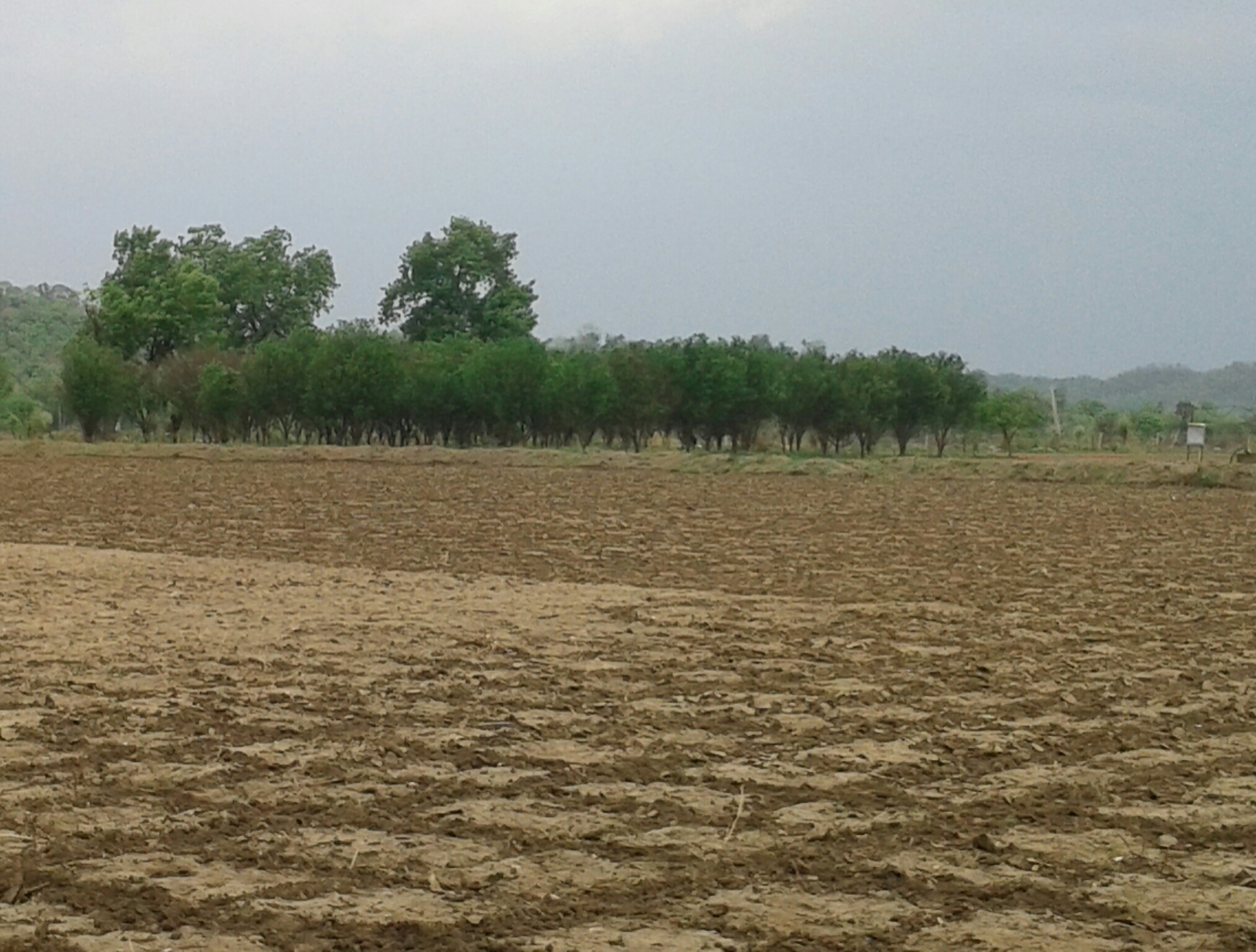
Farmland in Vidarbha region

The GDP of the region is estimated to be ₹5,445.4 billion (US$58 billion) 2022-23. The region also holds considerable mineral resources and forest cover. The region is economically under developed compared to the rest of Maharashtra with considerable poverty and malnutrition.

The economy of the region is largely dependent on agriculture with oranges and cotton being the major crops. Agriculture is largely dependent on seasonal monsoons and the region receives very less rainfall. Droughts and famines are common with more than 1.4 lakh farmer suicides in the period 1997 to 2006. Though the federal government has provided relief packages aimed at the region, with corruption rampant in the region. Columnist and journalist P Sainath opined that the relief packages were destined to fail as corruption in the government meant that little impact happened on the ground.

Nagpur is a major hub for business and healthcare. MIHAN is the major cargo hub in the region, operational out of Nagpur Airport. Nagpur also hosts Information Technology Special Economic Zone (IT SEZ) for information-technology companies. Amravati and Yavatmal are known for cotton production. Chandrapur has a thermal power station, which is one of the biggest in India. There are other heavy industries and mines in the region.

The region has mineral resources with coal and manganese, the major minerals. Iron ore and limestone have also been identified as potential mining resources. Chandrapur district contributes 29% of all mineral output of Maharashtra.

== Sports and recreation ==
Cricket is the most popular sport in the region. Nagpur's Vidarbha Cricket Association Ground (VCA) hosted international cricket matches. In 2008, the new Vidarbha Cricket Association Stadium was built in Jamtha.

The eastern part of Vidarbha consists of Maharashtra's oldest National Park, the Tadoba Andhari Tiger Reserve, one of the Project Tiger Reserves. Shegaon is a place of pilgrimage with temples attributed to the Hindu saint Gajanan Maharaj who lived there. Chikhaldara in Amravati district is a hill station and popular tourist destination.

== Politics ==
Vidarbha has ten Lok Sabha constituencies. Nagpur district has two seats Nagpur and Ramtek, while Gadchiroli-Chimur Lok Sabha constituency is spread across districts of Chandrapur, Gadchiroli and Gondia. Yavatmal and Washim districts form part of Yavatmal–Washim Lok Sabha constituency. Other seats include Akola, Amravati, Bhandara, Buldhana, Gondia, and Wardha. Amravati and Ramtek seats are reserved for Scheduled Caste candidates, while Gadchiroli-Chimur is reserved for Scheduled Tribes. In the Maharashtra Legislative Assembly, the region is represented by 62 Vidhan Sabha seats.

== Demand for statehood ==
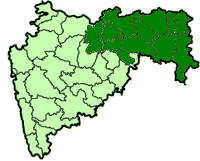
Vidarbha region in Maharashtra (dark green)

The Vidarbha movement started in the 1930s demanding a separate state of Vidarbha. The demand has been raised at times due to perceived neglect of the region by the Government of Maharashtra. While the demand is supported by major political parties BJP and Congress, it is opposed by Shiv Sena, one of the major regional political parties in the state. Political economist Shrikant Jichkar opposed the separation of the region from Maharashtra, stating that it was not sustainable. He noted that income from available natural resources would not be able to balance the subsidies given by the government, whose cooperation would be vital to any development and that the division introduces societal risks due to dividing of the Marathi-speaking state.

== See also ==
- Dehani lift irrigation scheme
- List of cities in Vidarbha
- List of Maratha dynasties and states
- Manav Vikas Mission
- Proposed states and territories of India
