= Streptomyces lonarensis =

Scientific classification
- Domain: Bacteria
- Kingdom: Bacillati
- Phylum: Actinomycetota
- Class: Actinomycetia
- Order: Streptomycetales
- Family: Streptomycetaceae
- Genus: Streptomyces
- Species: S. lonarensis

Binomial name
- Streptomyces lonarensis Sharma et al. 2016

Type strain
- DSM 42084, KCTC 39684, MTCC 11708, NCL 716

Species of bacterium

Streptomyces lonarensis is an alkaliphilic bacterium species from the genus of Streptomyces which has been isolated from soil from the Lonar Lake in India.

== See also ==
- List of Streptomyces species
