= Lift irrigation =

Method of irrigation

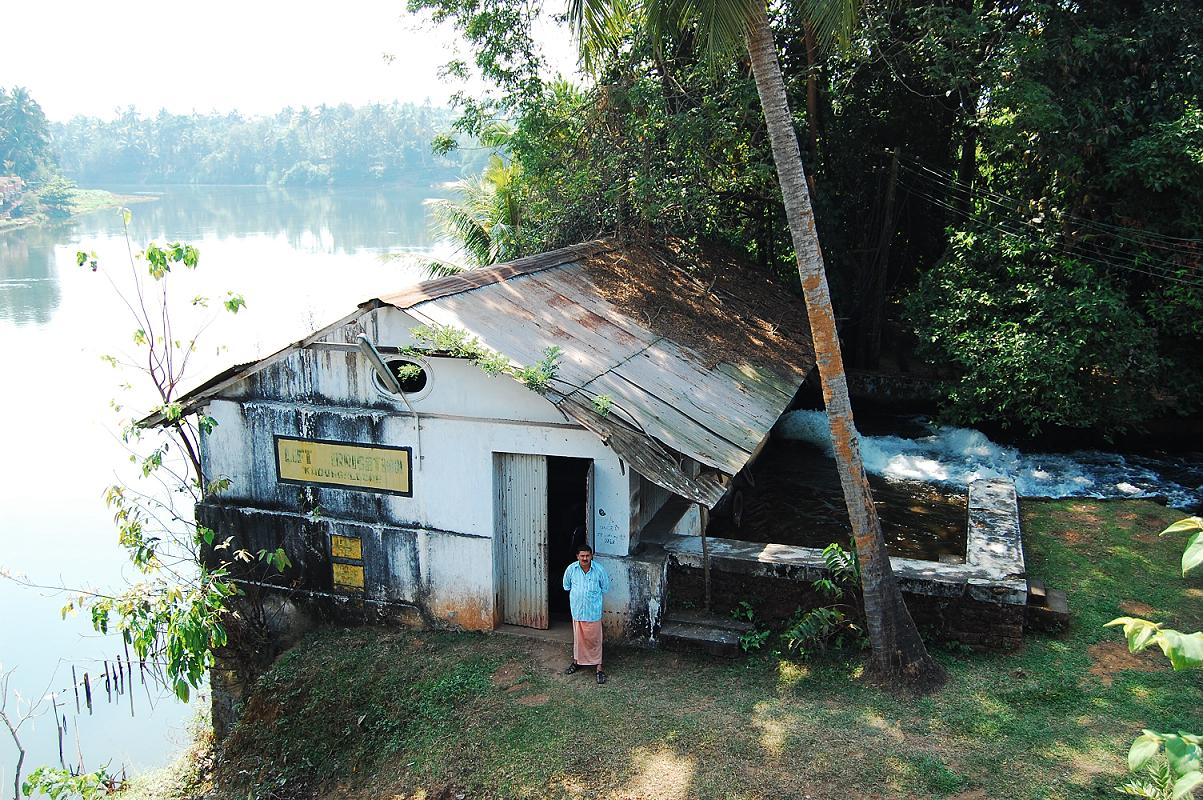
Periyar lift irrigation in Kadungallur, Kerala

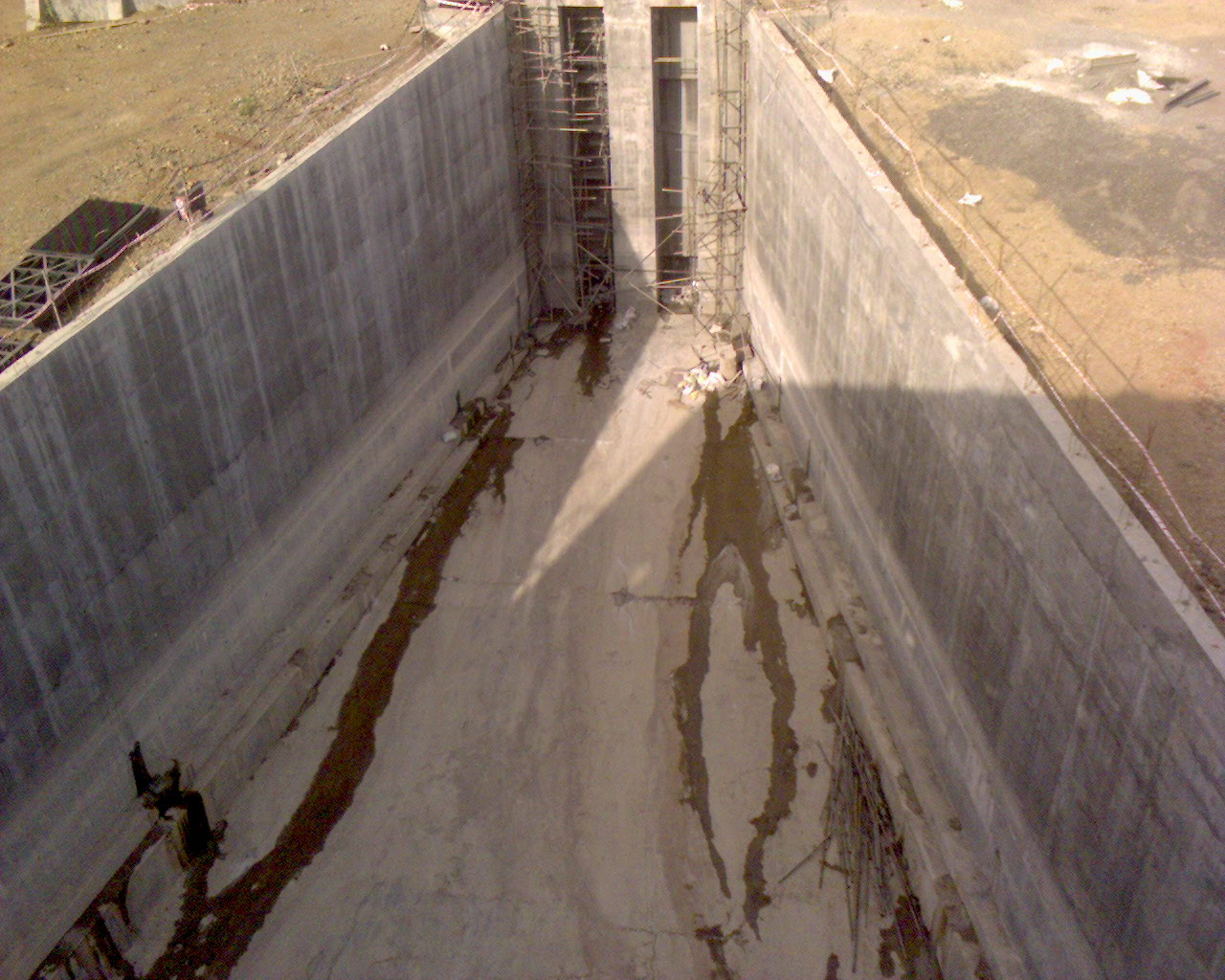
Forebay, Stage-1 of Dehani lift irrigation scheme, Maharashtra

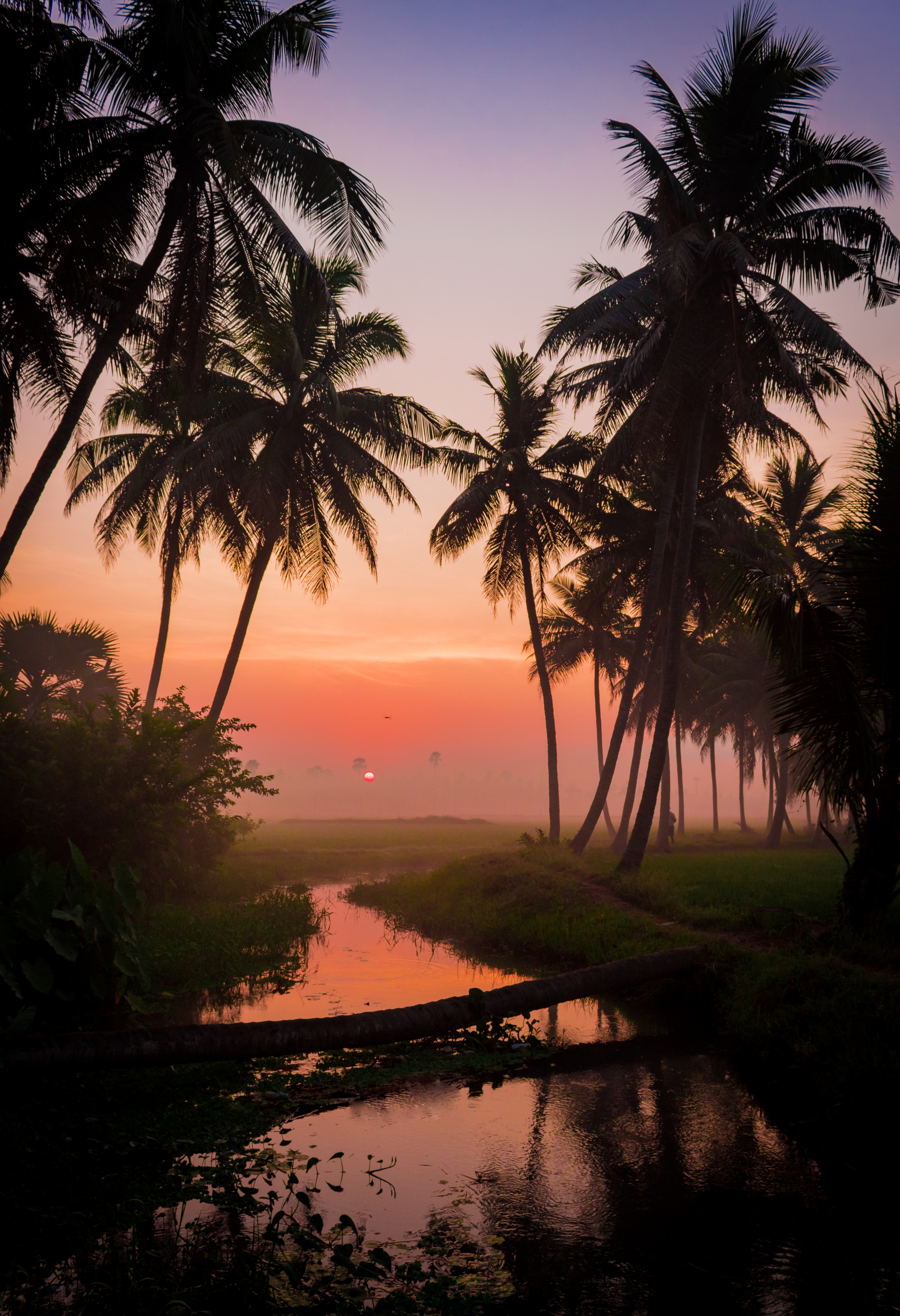
Lift Irrigation canal in West Godavari district

Lift irrigation is a method of irrigation in which water is not transported by natural flow, (as in gravity-fed canal) but is lifted with pumps or surge pools etc.

== Overview ==
Lift irrigation schemes must accomplish two main tasks: first, to carry water by means of pumps or other way, from the water source to the main delivery chamber, which is situated at the top most point in the command area. Second. they must distribute this water to the field of the beneficiary farmers by means of a suitable and proper distribution. So that in Lift Irrigation system, the gravity flow of water by canals or river is not available or used.

== Distribution ==
Of these two issues, distribution is the most complex, for several reasons. First, whereas the system for collecting water at the main delivery chamber makes use of pumps, the distribution system is typically completely gravity-based, and have to be designed solely on the basis of the available hydraulic head. In addition, the area to be irrigated is scattered and has varying topography, and each farm is of a different size, so it can be a challenge to design a gravity-based system that allots each farmer a fair amount of water. Several mechanisms have been developed to meet these challenges.

In the most prevalent system, the area under irrigation is divided into different blocks according to topography determined by contour plan. The water requirement for each block is determined, and pipe lines are designed for these blocks depending on the available head and required discharge. Field delivery chambers are then constructed on the distribution pipe lines, and valves are fitted to control the flow of the pipe lines, with flow from the main delivery chamber controlled by these valves. In this system, lines for lower fields have more discharge, because the force of gravity is greater, so water distribution can be unequal.

In other systems, the area is divided into three or four equal parts, and each part is given the entire discharge for one day. This means each part gets rotation of the full design discharge on the fourth or fifth day. Again, however, water distribution can be unequal, and alternate methods of distribution have been proposed to deal with this problem.

== List of lift irrigation schemes with Equal and Proportionate Distribution ==
Name of the Scheme	Location TQ.	Design Discharge Liters/sec	Irrigable Area, Hectare	No. of Members5	Working Since2011	Financed By	Estimated Cost, Rs. in lakhs	Actual Expenses
Abhyutthan Gram Vikas Mandal	Naranpur, Tal Uchchhal; Tapi district	368.00	467	909	2010	Irrigation Dept.Govt.of Gujarat and Abhyutthan Gram Vikas Mandal	914.00	881.30
Shivganga; Co-op LI Scheme	Pimpalgaon Bahula; Nashik district	250.00	50	61	1999	Nashik district Central Coop Bank Ltd	45.44	40.00
Jai Malhar; Co-op LI Scheme	Indorey, Tal Dindori; Nashik district	100.00	100	114	2004	Own Funds and Maharashtra Prabodhan Seva Mandal	75.00	72.30
Karbhari R. Nagre and Others	Pimpalgaon Bahula; Nashik district	30.00	40	7	2002	Own Funds	44.50	37.00
Waregaon; Pathre Co-op LI Scheme	Pathre, Tal. Sinnar Nashik district	200.00	170	163	2006	Nashik district Central Co-op Bank Ltd	150.00	N.A
Sonai Co-op; LI Scheme	Kondhar, Tal. Nandgaon; Nashik district	Survey, design completed, proposal submitted and pending for financial sanction.				Nashik district Central Co-op Bank Ltd		
Loknete V. Hiray; Co-op LI Scheme	Pumbarde tal. Malegaon; Nashik district	Survey, design completed, proposal submitted and pending for financial sanction				Nashik district Central Co-op Bank Ltd		
Yogesh Co-op; LI Scheme	Nalwadi, Tal Dindori; Nashik district	Survey, design completed, proposal submitted and pending for financial sanction				Nashik district Central Co-op Bank Ltd		

== About Lift Irrigation ==
In LI water is lifted from lower level to higher level with the help of pumps and other equipment. Construction of dams and canals helped tremendously to increase the irrigated area lying at lower level than the dam level, but scarcity of water remained the problem for higher level areas. So as to bring higher level area under irrigation L.I.S. are taken up. The 8% of Maharashtra irrigation is occupied by lift irrigation.

== Advantages of Lift Irrigation ==
1. Lift irrigation made irrigation possible at higher level.
2. Land acquisition problem in L.I.S. is less.
3. Water losses are low.
4. Man power is less used.

== Requirements of Lift Irrigation System (LIS) ==
Water Source-Suitable and constant water source should be available for whole year at the site of LIS. Water can be made available through Dams, Weir, River canal etc.
Lifting Medium-To lift water to the desired location, lifting medium i.e. pumps are required. Depending upon the Duty point head, discharge the different types of pumps are selected.
Conveying Medium-Rising main may be of steel, concrete or any other suitable material.

== Lift Irrigation Scheme in Telangana ==
In India, the National Bank for Agriculture and Rural Development reports that there are 1401 lift irrigation schemes financed by them. These schemes irrigate 22000 hectares of land, and have a total financial outlay of Rs. 6462.5 million. However, as many as 573 of these schemes are defunct, mainly due to poor distribution of water. Other schemes have been financed by the government, sugar factories, or individual farmers.

Water shortage is a huge predicament for a country like India which still relies on monsoon rains for much of its agricultural practices. As weather patterns become increasingly uncertain with time, most likely due to global warming, being prepared to cope with water shortages in the future is essential. Rural communities as well as huge population which are greatly affected by water scarcity are the people living in drought-prone areas or in semi-arid up-lands. Much of these disadvantaged areas are also inhibited by tribal villages in many parts of India and are also backward in agricultural practices. These tribal villages are mainly self-sustained in their living habits and rely heavily on the paddy crops for endurance. It is becoming progressively more intricate to maintain tribal lifestyle due to uncertain weather patterns resulting in dwindling of agricultural production over time and all the more increasing the burden on state to raise their standard of living in terms of food security, education, and health care. It is also seen, when time gets tough, villagers generally tend to migrate on a seasonal basis to seek other means of livelihood. Such seasonal migration of entire village population also affects their settled life hampering their children's education as well as their access to other developmental support coming from state.

It is consequently important to help their agriculture instead in order to reduce the incidence of migration in such areas. This can only be achieved by ensuring there is sufficient crop to feed villagers and to sell at market to allow income generation. Irrigation is the essential input to the soil for any vegetation to grow. It is used to lend a hand in the growing of agricultural crops, maintenance of landscapes, and potentials of vegetation by restoring humidity / humus in depleted soils of dry areas and during periods of insufficient rainfall. Additionally, irrigation also has a few other uses in crop production, which include shielding plants against frost, suppressing weed and wild vegetation in grain fields and helping in preventing soil erosion. In contrast, agriculture that relies only on direct rainfall is referred to as rain-fed agriculture, or if it falls in semi-arid regions, it is called dry land farming. Irrigation is often studied together with drainage, which is the natural or artificial removal of surface and subsurface water from a given area. Various types of irrigation techniques differ in how the water obtained from the source, and is distributed within the field. In general, the aim is to supply water homogeneously to the entire field, so that each land patch has enough amount of water it needs, neither too much nor too little. Irrigation Schemes primarily comprises canal irrigation and lift irrigation schemes. In such schemes, the most important and yet the most neglected part is the local ownership and institutions of farmers taking operative and m responsibilities.

== Participatory Irrigation Management ==
The main purpose of the irrigation reform programme in Andhra Pradesh is to improve the sustainability and productivity of irrigation through sharing irrigation management responsibility with the farmers organized as Water Users Associations. Towards this the State government enacted the Andhra Pradesh Farmers Management of Irrigation System Act in 1997. Presently, water users’ organizations under the APFMIS Act is constituted at three different levels in major irrigation projects - Water Users Associations (WUAs) at the minor canal level, Distributor Committees (DCs) at the distributor canal level and Project Committee (PCs) at the main canal level. In medium irrigation project they are constituted at two levels – WUA at the minor canal level and PC at the main canal level. In minor irrigation tanks only a WUA is constituted covering the whole tank command. A total of 10,748 WUAs have been constituted – 2261 in major irrigation projects, 410 in medium irrigation projects and 8077 in minor irrigation tanks.

The water users’ organizations undertake the responsibilities of seasonal crop planning and irrigation water regulation, O&M works on canal system and assist in tax collection. To facilitate the functioning of the water users’ organizations the State government re-ploughs 100% of the irrigation water tax collected from them. The water tax collection and plough back for O&M to water users’ organizations over the last 5 years is given in the Table below:

	Collection (in Rs. million)	O&M Plan (in Rs. millions)	Plough Back (in Rs. millions)	Budgetary Support (in Rs. millions)
2005-06	560	NA	0	0
2006-07	670	NA	300	0
2007-08	750	NA	300	0
2008-09	1150	2000	600	1400
2009-10	1320 (Projected)	1600	1000	600

== Maintenance of Lift Irrigation Schemes in AP ==
In Andhra Pradesh, Andhra Pradesh State Irrigation Development Corporation (APSIDC) was established in 1974 to exploit the ground and surface water potential through lifts in a big way. Till now APSIDC has constructed around 1150 Lift Irrigation Schemes, creating an irrigation potential of 430000 acres. There are several LIS constructed by Irrigation & Power Department, private farmers and farmer societies, creating an irrigation potential of about 2,70,000 acres. The schemes constructed by I & P D are being maintained by the department even now. APSIDC has constructed some schemes with the share capital (25%) given by the government and the balance 75% capital raised through Nationalized banks refinanced by NABARD. These schemes were maintained by APSIDC (IDC) till 1995. Later all these schemes were either handed over to the farmer's societies for maintenance or kept under lock and key. Some other schemes were constructed by IDC on agency basis as deposit works. These were handed over either to the beneficiary societies or sponsoring agencies for maintenance after commissioning.

== Maintenance of the LI Scheme by the Beneficiary Committee Society ==
There are several parameters influencing the maintainability of LIS by the beneficiaries. The inter and intra village rivalries, the empowerment and social involvement levels of the farmers, the electricity tariff rates (now it has been made free), quality and quantity of power supply, the quality and performance of different components of the LIS and the performance of whole LIS as a system etc. The Tyullar LIS was handed over to the beneficiaries during 2008. The scheme is being maintained by the beneficiaries successfully from 2008.

The profit and loss statement of the Tyullar LI Society shows that income over expenditure in the last 3 years is Rs 22, 12,551/- The society is cash rich and ready to meet any un-expected expenditure due to any contingency in the scheme. This ensures sustainability of maintenance by the society.

== Farmer’s Associations manage LI Schemes and pay for O&M ==
One of the main issues confronting irrigation system transfer is to decide on who would pay the cost of operation and maintenance of the system. APSIDC has handed over the LI schemes to Farmer's Associations to operate, maintain and manage. The Farmers’ Association members, who take over a scheme, will sign an agreement among themselves to share water as well as the cost of operation and maintenance equitably. The basis of each family's contribution will be worked out by the members and included in the annex to the MOA between the FA and APSIDC. The SO will facilitate this process and may sign as a witness.
