= Gotra, Maharashtra =

Village in Maharashtra, India

Gotra गोत्रा
- Village
- Country: India
- Maharashtra: Maharashtra
- Buldhana: Buldhana district
- Founder: -
- Named for: Gotra

Government
  - Type: Grampanchayat

Languages
  - Official: Marathi
- Time zone: UTC+5:30 (IST)
- 443302: 443302
- Website: www.buldhana.nic.in

Gotra is a village in the Lonar Taluka of Buldhana district, Maharashtra state, India.

== Demographics ==
Covering 700 hectares (1,700 acres) and comprising 277 households at the time of the 2011 census of India, Gotra had a population of 1244. There were 672 males and 572 females, with 191 people being aged six or younger.
