= Streptomyces alkalithermotolerans =

Scientific classification
- Domain: Bacteria
- Kingdom: Bacillati
- Phylum: Actinomycetota
- Class: Actinomycetia
- Order: Streptomycetales
- Family: Streptomycetaceae
- Genus: Streptomyces
- Species: S. alkalithermotolerans

Binomial name
- Streptomyces alkalithermotolerans Sultanpuram et al. 2015

Type strain
- AC3

Species of bacterium

Streptomyces alkalithermotolerans is an alkaliphilic and thermotolerant bacterium species from the genus Streptomyces which has been isolated from the Lonar soda lake in India.

== See also ==
- List of Streptomyces species
