= Shiva crater =

Alleged impact crater west of India

- Location within India
- Location: Offshore west of Mumbai, India; 18°40′N 70°14′E

Impact crater structure
- Confidence: Dubious
- Diameter: 500 km (310 mi)
- Age: ~66 million years Cretaceous–Paleogene boundary (claimed)
- Exposed: No
- Drilled: No

The Shiva crater is a proposed impact crater on the Indian continental shelf, located offshore to the west of Mumbai. Paleontologist Sankar Chatterjee and his colleagues proposed that the crater was formed around the Cretaceous–Paleogene boundary. They suggested that the impact may have contributed to the K–Pg extinction event. However, other researchers have found no convincing evidence of an impact structure.

== Formation and geology ==
As per paleontologist Sankar Chatterjee and his colleagues, the Shiva crater was formed around 65 million years ago, about the same time as a number of other impact craters were formed during the Cretaceous–Paleogene boundary. The age of the structure is inferred from the Deccan Traps which overlie part of it. The structure is estimated to be approximately 600 km (370 mi) long and 400 km (250 mi) wide. If confirmed as an impact crater, it would be the largest known impact crater on Earth. Unlike typical known extraterrestrial impact structures, the crater is teardrop shaped. Chatterjee argues that the low angle of an impact combined with boundary fault lines and unstable rock led to this unusual formation. Although the site has shifted since its formation due to sea floor spreading, Chatterjee proposed that it was formed by a asteroid approximately 40 km (25 mi) in diameter.

During the Cretaceous–Paleogene boundary, the Indian plate was located over the Réunion hotspot of the Indian Ocean. Hot material rising from the mantle flooded parts with a vast amount of lava, creating the Deccan Traps. It has been hypothesized that the significant geothermal activity in this region coupled with the impact which caused the crater together set ideal conditions for the maturation of oil and natural gas, which, it is suggested, is the reason for its high rate of occurrence there today.

=== K-Pg extinction event ===
Chatterjee proposed that the Shiva crater and other possible impact craters such as the Chicxulub crater were formed by multiple impacts which resulted in the massive extinction event at the end of the Cretaceous period. It has also been argued that since the Chicxulub impact is believed by some researchers to have occurred earlier, the impact that created the Shiva crater was enough to cause the mass extinction by itself. However, academic Paul R. Renne of the University of California, Berkeley suggests that the Chicxulub crater was formed within the time frame of when the mass extinction occurred.

== Criticism ==
The claims of an impact crater have been refuted by other researchers. Christian Koeberl, a professor of geology at the University of Vienna and a specialist on impact craters, described in 2004 that the claim was "a figment of imagination". He stated that the claim was "inconsistent not only with the regional geology and geophysics, but also with anything we know about impact cratering." In 2007, American geologist Gerta Keller stated, "We have worked extensively throughout India and investigated a number of the localities where Sankar Chatterjee claims to have evidence of a large impact he calls Shiva crater... Unfortunately, we have found no evidence to support his claims. Sorry to say, this is all nonsense." Geophysicist Sean Gulick stated, "There's a bunch of problems to say the least. There is no evidence that [Chatterjee is] presenting of it actually being a crater", and described the oval shape of the structure as unlikely for an impact crater. In the 2013 book Earth System Processes and Disaster Management, geologists Jayanta K. Pati and Puniti Pati write that "...the proposed Shiva structure in the Arabian Sea to the southwest of the Indian subcontinent (Chatterjee et al. 2006) have also been suggested to be of possible impact origin. However, Chatterjee et al. (2006) do not provide any substantial evidence for the existence of a crater structure and certainly not for the existence of an impact structure at Shiva."

== See also ==
Impact craters in India

- Lonar crater at Lonar in Buldhana district of Maharashtra
- Luna crater at Kutch district of Gujarat
- Ramgarh Crater in Mangrol tehsil of Baran district of Rajasthan

Other related topics

- List of impact craters on Earth
- List of possible impact structures on Earth

Indian Ocean submerged features

- Central Indian Ridge
- Southeast Indian Ridge
- Southwest Indian Ridge
- Rodrigues triple junction
