= Ramgarh crater =

Impact crater in Rajasthan

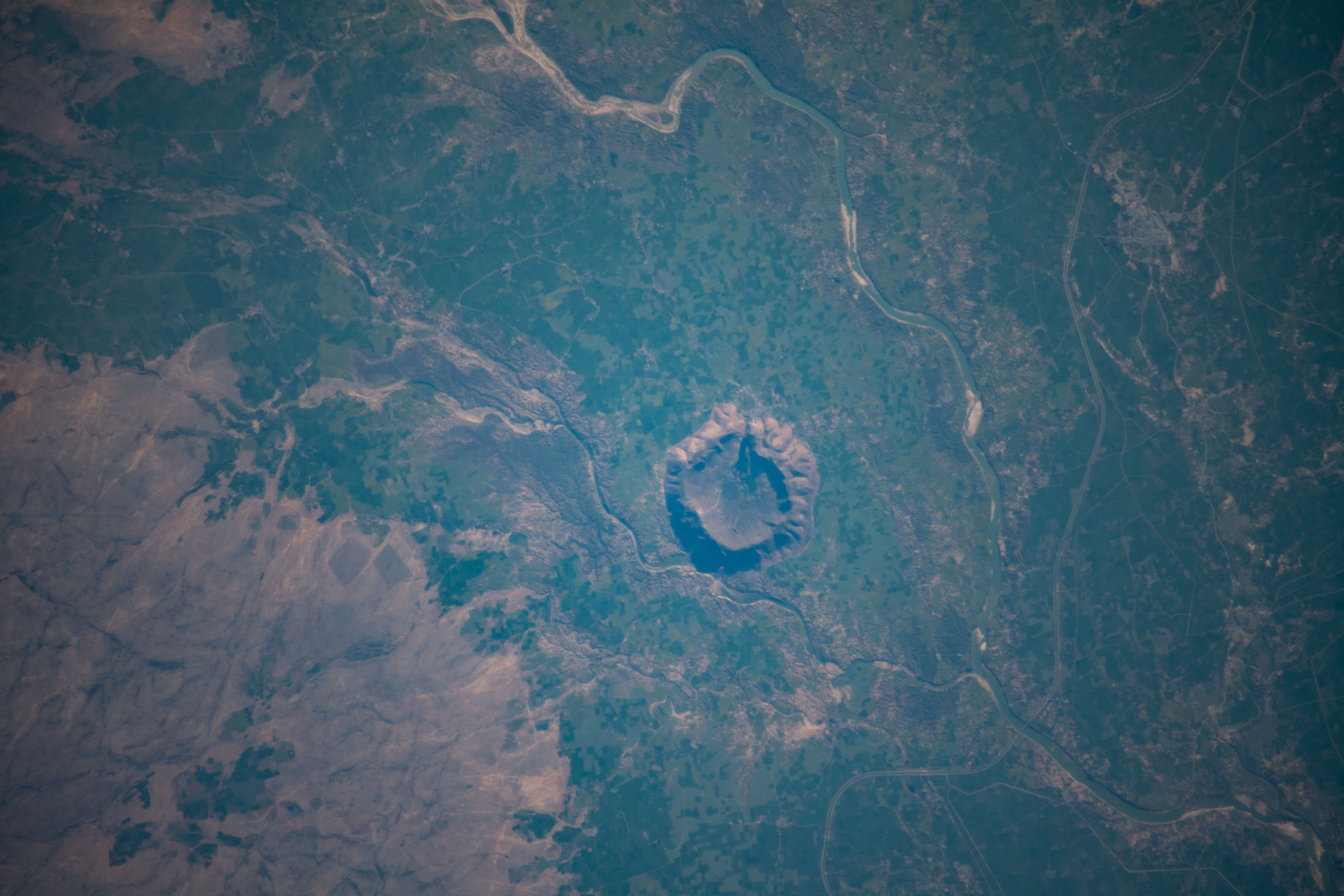
- View of the crater from the International Space Station

- Location within India
- Location: Ramgarh, Baran district, Rajasthan, India; 25°20′16″N 76°37′29″E

Impact crater structure
- Confidence: Confirmed
- Diameter: 3.2 km (2.0 mi) (Note: While the crater diameter is typically reported as 3.2–4 m (10–13 ft), some studies have proposed that the apparent collar is not the crater rim but instead represents a much larger impact structure with an approximate diameter of 10 km (6.2 mi).)

National Geological Monuments of India
- Official name: Ramgarh crater
- Designated: 2018
- Designated by: Geological Survey of India

Ramgarh crater is an impact crater near Ramgarh in Baran district of the Indian state of Rajasthan. Measuring 3.2 km (2.0 mi) in diameter, it rises 150–200 m (490–660 ft) above the surrounding plains. The site was designated as a National Geological Monument by the Geological Survey of India in 2018.

Ramgarh structure was initially considered an intrusive formation but several later theories were proposed regarding its origin and subsequent studies favoured an impact origin. Based on a 2020 study that provided stronger evidence for an impact origin, the Earth Impact Database classified the structure as a confirmed hypervelocity impact crater in 2020. Uranium–lead dating has its formation to the late Cambrian (528 to 395 Ma), while other studies have proposed a younger age.

== Description ==
Ramgarh crater is located near Ramgarh in Baran district of the Indian state of Rajasthan. The crater ring lies at an average elevation of 260 m (850 ft), while the surrounding plain lies at about 240 m (790 ft). Measuring 3.2 km (2.0 mi) in diameter, the crater walls rise 150–200 m (490–660 ft) from the surrounding plains. A small hill with a height of 6 m (20 ft) and base width of 20 m (66 ft) raises from the center of the crater.

The north-south measurement of the crater rim is approximately 1.4 times of its east-west extension. The crater is surrounded by an ejecta zone extending up to 770 m (2,530 ft) from the rim. The rim is discontinuous in the southwest and is displaced by several strike-slip faults. A small rivulet arises from the southwest chasm of the crater, which joins the Parbati River, located 4 km (2.5 mi) to the west. There are several other gullies and rills formed with radial and centripetal drainage towards the center of the crater.

== Geology and formation ==
The crater was visited by geologist Frederick Richard Mallet of the Geological Survey of India in 1869. Several scientific studies were conducted on the crater over the years. Based on unpublished maps of the crater by Kishen Singh in 1881-82, the Geological Survey of India catergorised it as an intrusion structure in the early 20th century. Further analysis and mapping of the area was carried out in the late 1960s and early 1970s. Magnetic and refraction seismic surveys conducted in the central depression in 1969-70 did not yield any evidence of the an intrusive body beneath the structure. In the early 1970s, several theories were proposed for the formation of the structure. One theory suggests that it formed through uplift caused by magma intrusion and tectonic movement, while other theories proposed its formation through kimberlite instrusion, lateral compression of shale, or diapirism.

In 1972, A. R. Crawford proposed a possible impact origin, after discovering shatter coned colluvium in the middle of the crater. Several studies during the 1970s including geological and satellite-imagery analyses, supported an impact origin, although the evidence remained inconclusive. A 452 m (1,483 ft) deep borehole drilled in the crater in 1981–1982 yielded no volcanic or intrusive rocks, further weakening the intrusion hypothesis. Subsequent remote sensing and digital-imaging studies identified several faults interpreted as later tectonic strike-slip faults after the formation of the crater. Studies in the 1990s increasingly treated it as a possible impact structure and focused on gathering further evidence for its impact origin.

In the early 21st century, claims and interpretations of planar deformation features and planar fractures on the quartz grains, which would prove its impact origin, were reported by several authors, but the evidence remained inconclusive. Studies also reported glass-like spherules rich in iron and silica and with elevated nickel and cobalt content and high natural remnant magnetization. These were interpreted as accretionary lapilli containing extraterrestrial material and were attributed to shock magnetization during an impact. The presence of minerals such as coesite, tridymite, and cristobalite suggested their formation under high pressure exceeding 30 GPa. However, the presence of microspherules does not conclusively establish an impact origin, as similar glassy spherules can form through various natural processes and impact spherules are generally expected in distal ejecta rather than at the centre of a crater.

A 2020 study provided stronger evidence supporting the impact origin of the Ramgarh crater. It documented the presence of planar deformation features, planar fractures, and feather features in quartz grains from sandstones and breccias in the central part of the structure. The crystallographic orientation of these features were consistent with shock deformation, corresponding to estimated pressures of approximately 4–10 GPa. Based on this study, the Earth Impact Database confirmed the structure as a hyper-velocity impact crater in 2020.

=== Ageing ===
Based on Uranium–lead dating, the Ramgarh impact event is proposed to have occurred between 528 and 395 million years ago (Ma). This places the event close to the Precambrian–Cambrian boundary (~543 Ma). The impact may have occurred in a shallow-water environment, as suggested by soft-sediment deformation features near the apparent crater rim and the overlying diamictite layer. The presence of gastropod fossils from the Middle Jurassic (174.1 to 164.5 Ma) within the diamictite layer might suggest that the impact happened during the period.

== See also ==
- Dhala crater – Impact structure in India
- Lonar lake – Crater Lake in Maharashtra, India
- Luna crater – Impact crater in Luna, Gujarat, India
- Shiva crater – Alleged impact crater west of India
- List of impact craters on Earth
- List of possible impact structures on Earth
