= Daitya Sudan Temple =

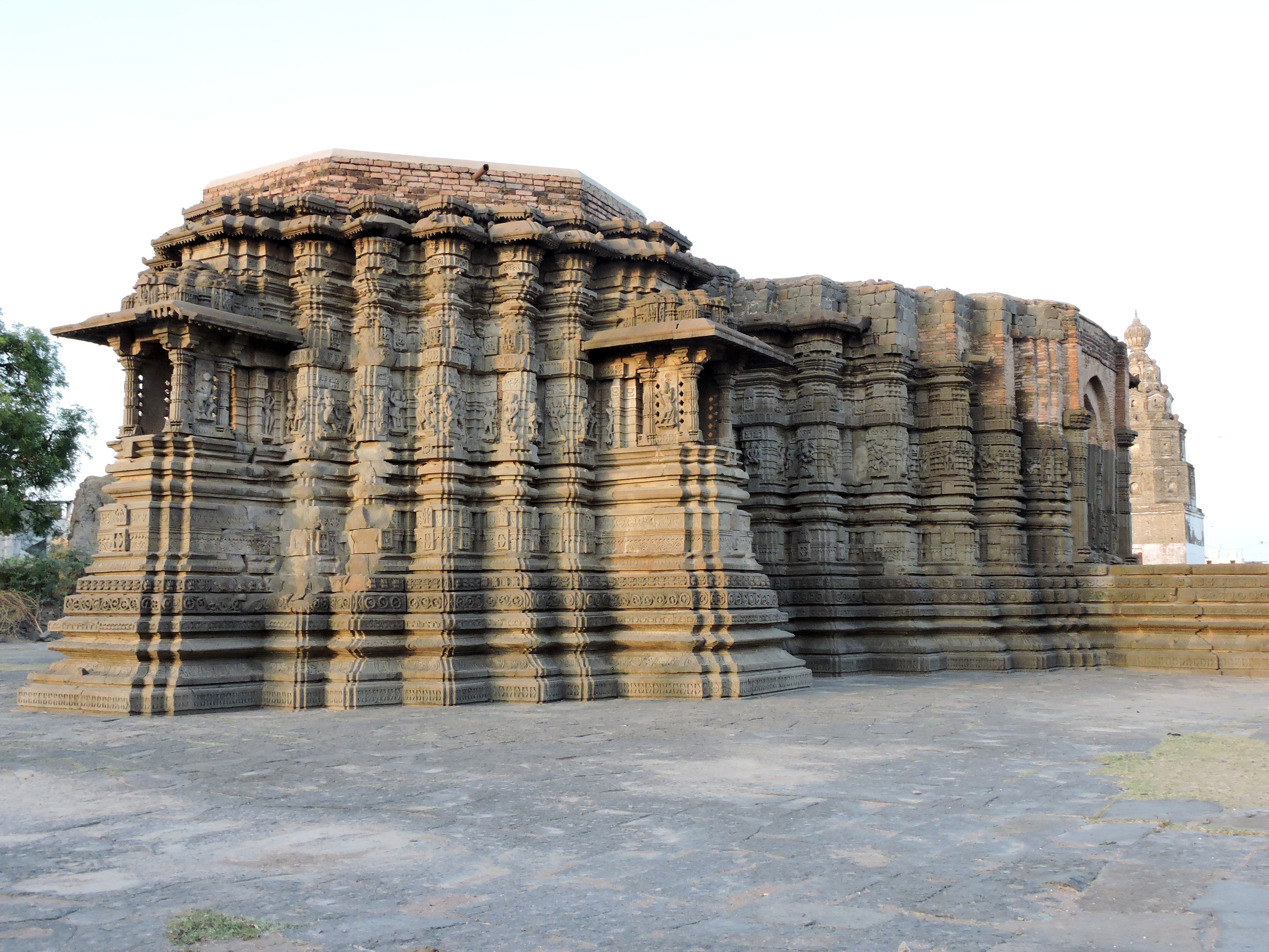

Religion
- Affiliation: Hinduism
- Deity: Vishnu as Daitya Sudan

Location
- Location: Buldhana district, Maharashtra
- Country: India
- Interactive map of Daitya Sudan Temple
- Coordinates: 19°59′01″N 76°31′11″E

Daitya Sudan Temple is a temple near Lonar Lake in the Indian state of Maharashtra.

== History ==
Henry Cousens dates the temple to the end of the 13th and beginning of the 14th centuries CE. He is of the opinion that the construction of the temple was never completed due to invasions of the Delhi Sultanate.

== Legend ==
The legend associated with the temple states that a giant named Lonasura (or Lavanasura) used to reside in the area. The giant terrorized humans and animals, and threatened to overthrow even the gods. The gods then beseeched Vishnu to assist them, who took upon the form of a handsome youth in order to gain assistance of the giant's two sisters. He discovered the giant's underground dwelling, threw the lid open, and then slew the giant, burying him within the same pit wherein he used to reside. Therefore, the Daitya Sudan (giant-slayer) incarnation of Vishnu is worshipped here.

The Lonar lake is supposed to be the pit within which the giant had resided, with its water representing his blood. A nearby hill is supposed to be the lid which Vishnu had thrown open.

== Description ==
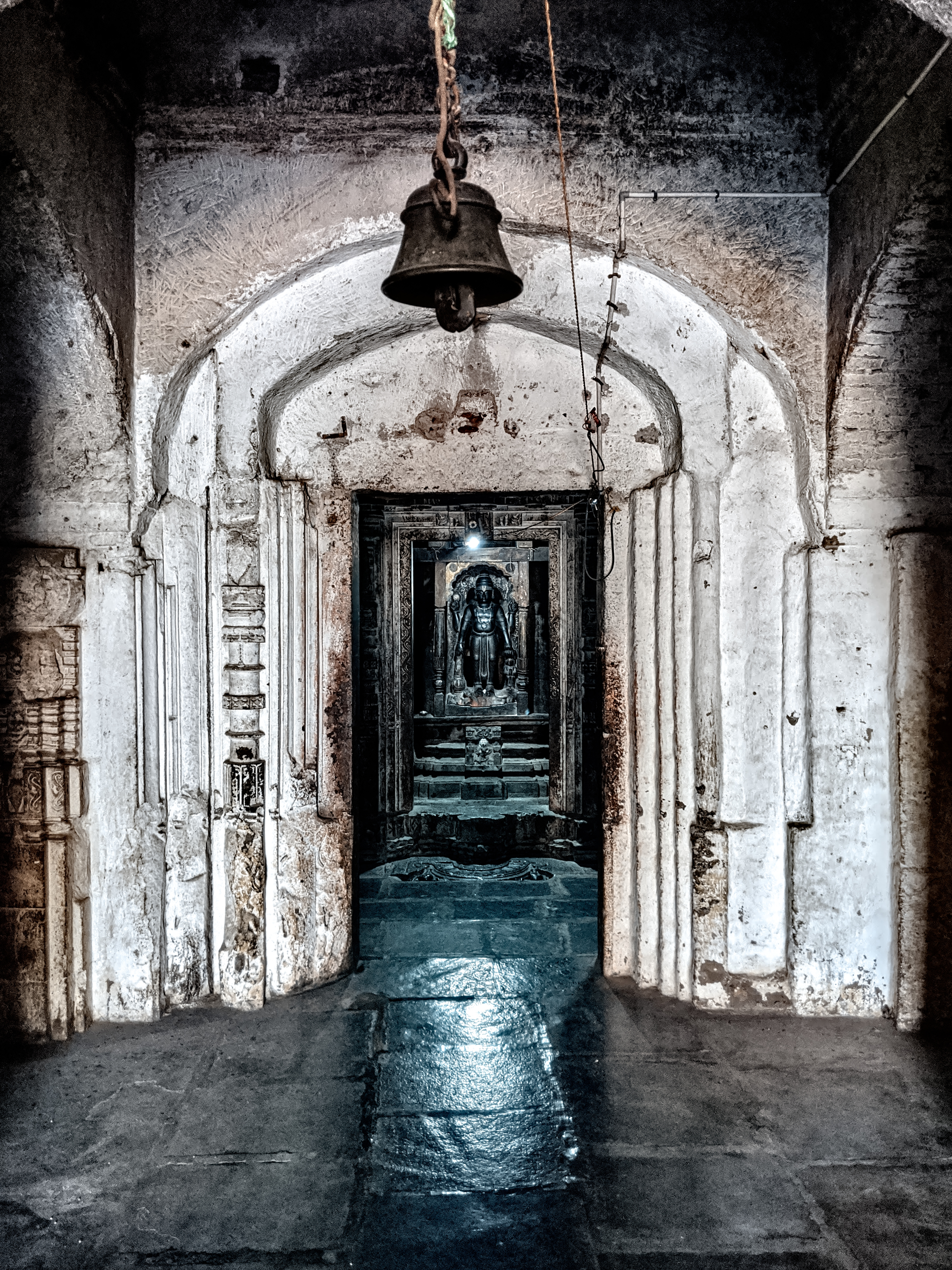
Sanctum with the principal deity Vishnu

The Hemadpanthi temple has a plan in the shape of an irregular star. Towards the east is a flight of ten steps, which leads to the terrace, where the principal entrance is located.

The temple is incomplete. A standing image of Surya occupies the niche at the back of the temple. This indicates that the temple might have been originally intended to be dedicated to Surya.

The doorway to the sanctum is carved elaborately with an image of Ganesha on its lintel. Within the sanctum is the idol of the principal deity Vishnu, in his four-armed form, holding a conch, a chakra, a club, and a man by the hair.
