= Dehani lift irrigation scheme =

Irrigation project in India

The Dehani lift irrigation scheme is a technologically sophisticated project to irrigate Vidarbha, a large, semi-arid region of India.

== Background ==
Vidharba is a semi-arid region that has an ailing agricultural community which has huge amounts of debts. This has led to a high farm suicide rate. The Prime Minister has proposed a centrally funded package to irrigate nearly 7,000 hectares (27 sq mi) and therefore provide economic relief.

== Details ==
The project is being executed by Vidarbha Irrigation Development Corporation and IVRCL Infrastructures and Projects Limited. The region to be irrigated is 6,968.01 hectares (26.9036 sq mi) in Dehani, Babhulgaon taluk, Yavatmal district, over the river Bembla at Khadasawanga. The project costed INR 1,988,300,000 (1.988 billion) and was completed in 2011.

This project was the first of its kind in India and envisions the drip irrigation of a large area, while making use of the latest in communication technology. The Supervisory Control and Data Acquisition System (SCADA) will interconnect all components of the system via a satellite uplink, making it possible for the central command centre of the irrigation scheme to be able to control all components remotely.

== Components ==
=== Bembla reservoir ===
The Bembla dam built over the river Bembla at Khadaksawanga is 7,650 metres (8,370 yd) long and 29.15 metres (95.6 ft) high, with a capacity of 322,068,000 cubic metres (421,249,000 cu yd). The Bembla project currently has a command area of 40,170 hectares (155.1 sq mi), and the completed project will have a command area of 52,543 hectares (202.87 sq mi). The total project cost is expected to be INR 12.8 billion.

=== Approach channel ===
A 1,700-metre (5,600 ft) approach channel carries water from the Bembla reservoir into the Forebay Stage-1. The channel is of trapezoidal cross-section.

=== Forebay Stage-1 ===
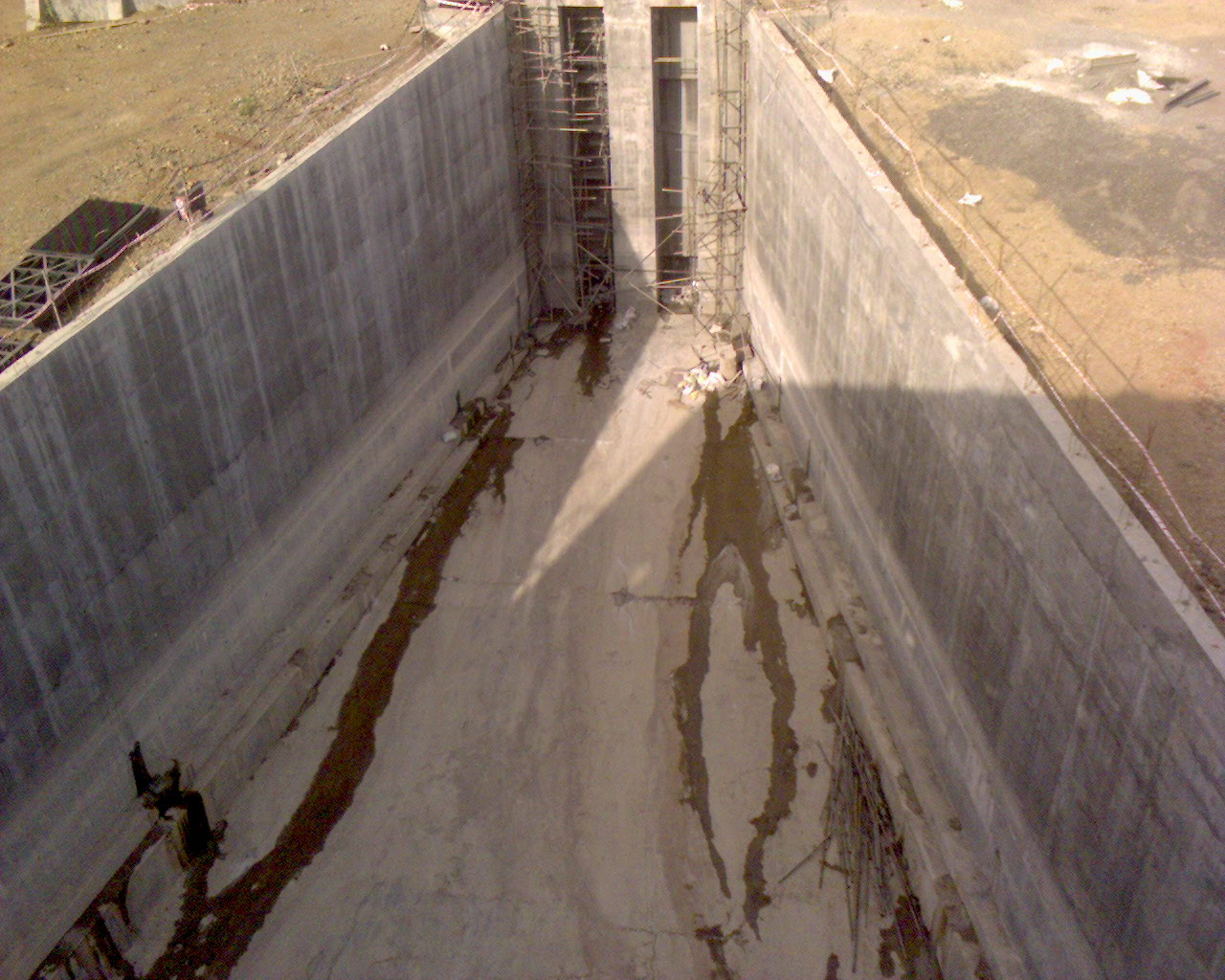
Forebay Stage-1

The forebay is 40 metres (130 ft) long and has an average depth of 12 metres (39 ft). This structure functions as a storage space for water before it is pumped farther ahead.

=== Pumphouse Stage-1 ===
This pumphouse is attached to the Forebay Stage-1 and has vertical turbine pumps with an installed capacity of 4,800 hp (3,600 kW). Water is pumped from a reduced level of 265 metres (869 ft) to the Main Distribution Chamber Stage-1 up to an elevation of 304 metres (997 ft) via the Rising Mains Stage-1, which consist of one row of 1,700 mm (67 in) steel pipe and one row of 900 mm (35 in) steel pipe.

=== Main Distribution Chamber (MDC) Stage-1 ===
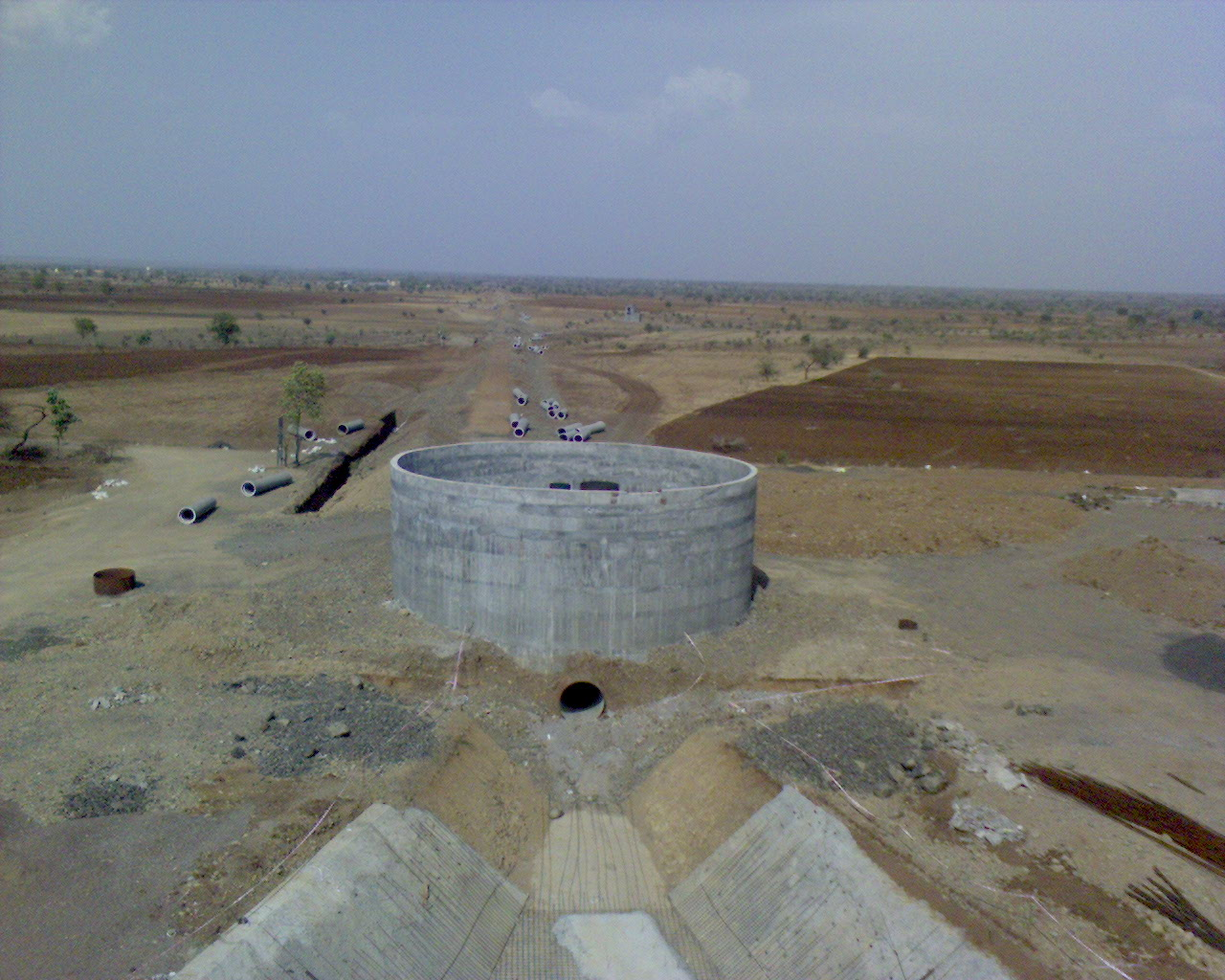
MDC Stage-1 and Forebay Stage-2

From MDC Stage-1, part of the water enters the forebay of Pumphouse Stage-2, which has an installed vertical turbine pump capacity of 1,640 hp (1,220 kW). The remainder of the water is supplied to 34 Sub Distribution Chambers via pre-stressed concrete pipes which form part of the Gravity Mains.

=== Sub Distribution Chamber (SDC) ===
Each SDC is a circular underground tank with a capacity of 150,000 litres (40,000 US gal). The average depth of each SDC below the ground level is 5–6 metres (16–20 ft). Each will service an area of 100 hectares (250 acres). Each SDC, along with its associated instrument panel room and transformer, has been allocated a 20 by 20 m (66 by 66 ft) area.

Each SDC has a 100 horsepower (75 kW) pump installed. A trained operator will be employed in each instrument panel room to make the relevant data entries regarding the type of crops on the sub-zones being serviced by that particular SDC. The programme distributes the exact amount of water required in each sub-zone and cuts off the flow when the requirement has been fulfilled.

The entire project has been divided into two stages, the first stage consists of 34 SDCs and the second stage consists of 23 SDCs. In all there will be 57 SDCs servicing the 57 zones that are subdivisions of the command area. Each zone is to be divided into 27 sub-zones. The SCADA system to be implemented is capable of delivering the exact amount of water required at each field according to the cropping pattern. It is proposed to train three representatives of the farming community from each zone, so that they will be able to operate the instrument panel of each SDC. For the initial three years of functioning, the IVRCL personnel will run the entire project, after which the responsibility of the day-to-day activities at the SDC will be handed over to the representatives of the farming community.

=== Forebay Stage-2 ===
Part of the water stored in the MDC Stage-1 is supplied into this forebay. From here 1,640 horsepower (1,220 kW) vertical turbine pumps (installed in the Pumphouse Stage-2) are used to pump the water farther ahead into the second stage of the project serviced by MDC Stage-2, which will supply 23 more SDCs.
