= Lonar Lake =

Crater Lake in Maharashtra, India

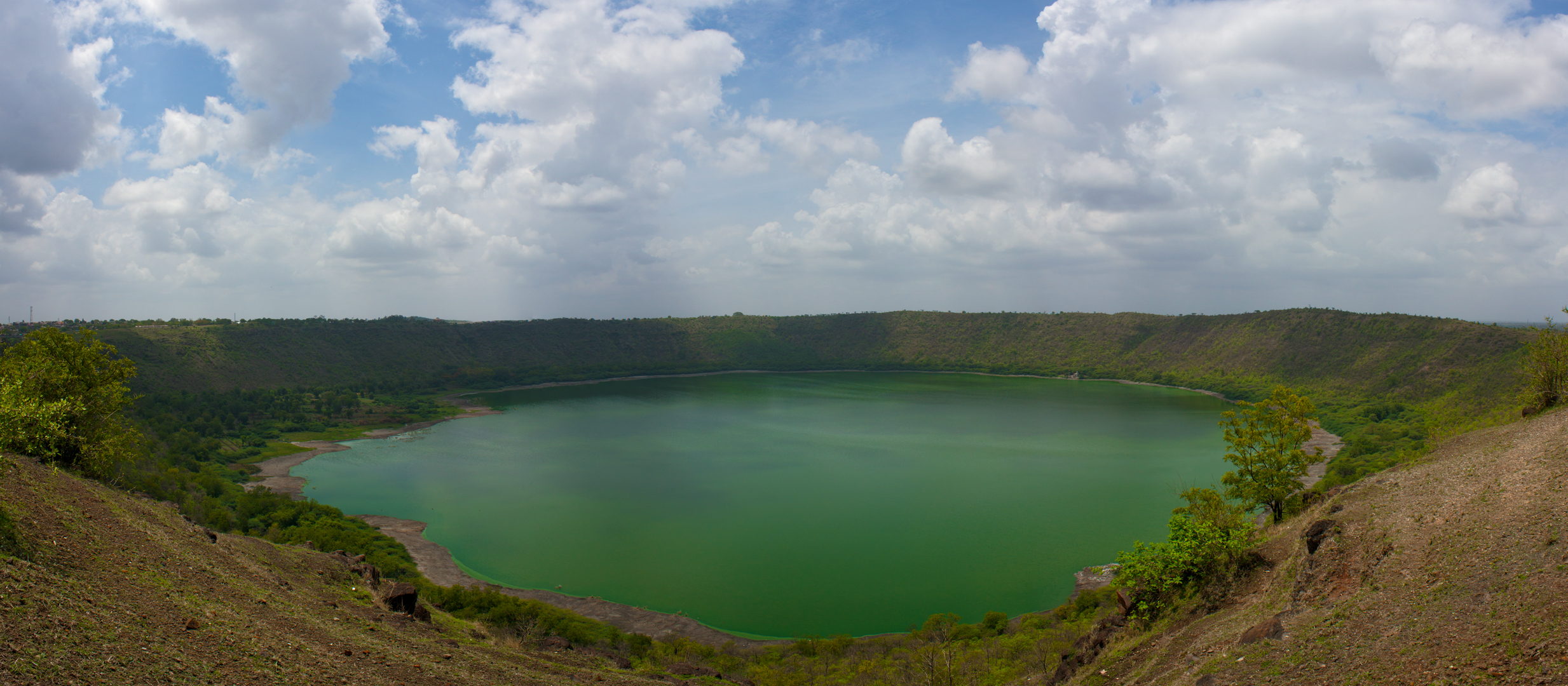

- Location in Maharashtra, India
- Location: Lonar, Maharashtra, India
- Coordinates: 19°58′30″N 76°30′27″E
- Type: Impact crater, salt, soda lake
- Basin countries: India
- Max. length: 1,830 m (6,000 ft)
- Surface area: 1.13 km^{2} (0.44 sq mi)
- Max. depth: 150 m (490 ft)
- Water volume: 0.15 km^{3} (0.036 cu mi)
- Residence time: IST
- Surface elevation: 480 m (1,570 ft)
- Settlements: Lonar

Ramsar Wetland
- Designated: 22 July 2020
- Reference no.: 2441

National Geological Monuments of India
- Designated: 1979

Lonar Lake is a saline, soda lake located near Lonar in Buldhana district of the Indian state of Maharashtra. It occupies an impact crater formed by a hypervelocity meteorite impact. It is the only crater lake of meteoritic origin in the country, and has been designated as a National Geological Monument and a Ramsar site.

The crater measures 1.8 km (1.1 mi) in diameter and is 150 m (490 ft) deep. While earlier analyses dated the structure to 52 ± 6 ka, subsequent argon-argon dating (^{40}Ar/^{39}Ar) yielded a much older age of 570 ± 47 ka. However, the ^{40}Ar/^{39}Ar age has been disputed, as inherited argon in the samples may have resulted in an overestimation of the crater's age. The crater lies on volcanic basalt of the Deccan Plateau, dating to about 66 Ma.

== Geography ==
Lonar Lake is located near Lonar in Buldhana district of the Indian state of Maharashtra. The lake is situated at an altitude of 480 m (1,570 ft) and occupies an impact crater measuring 1.83 km (1.14 mi) in diameter and 150 m (490 ft) deep. The crater rim is raised about 20 m (66 ft) from the surrounding land, and the crater walls dip at an angle between 5 and 25°.

It is a saline and a highly alkaline lake, lying within an endorheic basin. The basin is nearly circular in shape except on its northeastern side, where silt deposition has formed raised mud flats.

== Formation and geology ==
The impact crater on which the lake lies was formed by the hypervelocity impact of a two million tonne meteorite. The site is located in the Deccan Traps, a large igneous province in the Deccan Plateau composed of predominantly of basalt dating to about 66 Ma. The lake was initially thought to be of volcanic origin, but geological investigations established the crater's impact origin. Coarse breccia containing shatter cones and maskelynite-bearing have been recovered from drill cores beneath the crater floor, providing evidence of shock metamorphism associated with the impact. While earlier thermoluminescence analyses dated the structure to 52 ± 6 ka, subsequent argon-argon dating (^{40}Ar/^{39}Ar) yielded a much older age of 570 ± 47 ka. However, the ^{40}Ar/^{39}Ar age has been disputed, as inherited argon in the samples may have resulted in an overestimation of the crater's age.

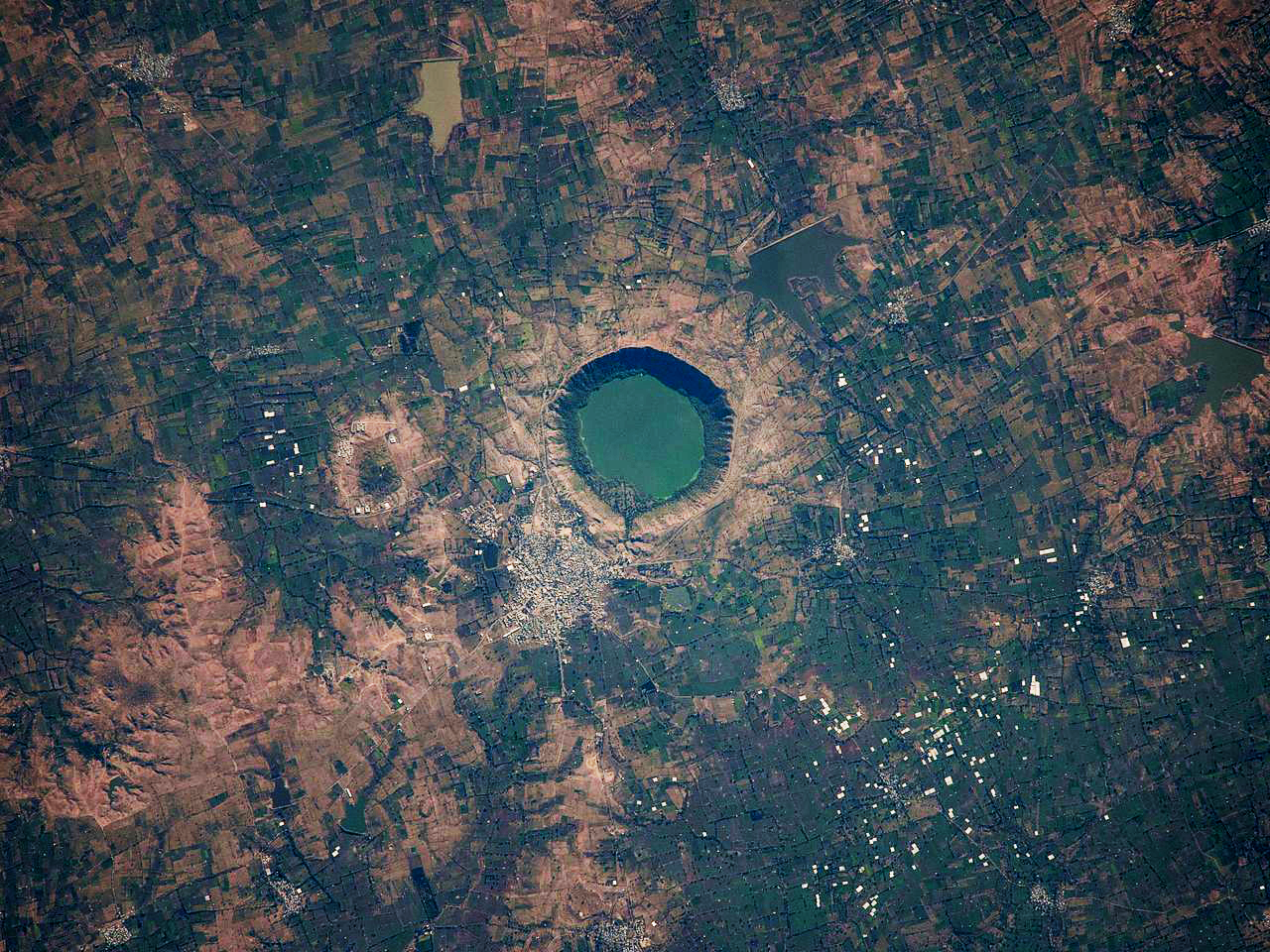
NASA satellite image of the crater

Lonar is the only terrestrial impact crater in the world that is formed entirely within basalt. The exposed rocks in the crater are compact, vesicular, and amygdaloidal basalt. The basalt flows dip away from the depression and successive lava flows are separated by red or bole coloured beds in places. The crater wall consists of 3 to 20 m (9.8 to 65.6 ft) thick, subhorizontal pahoehoe-like basaltic lava flows with vesicular tops and bottoms and dense interiors. The lavas are aphanitic and tholeiitic basalts, containing rare plagioclase and microphenocrysts. The crater wall shows no major faults, although rare faults with offsets of less than 10 m (33 ft) occur. A 2019 study conducted by IIT Bombay found that the minerals in soil samples from the crater were similar to those found in lunar rocks brough to Earth by the Apollo missions.

The impact crater is surrounded by a layer of debris formed from volcanic ejecta. This ejecta blanket extends about 2 km (1.2 mi) from the crater center. It is thickest near the crater rim and becomes thinner and discontinuous toward its outer edge. The ejecta blanket shows significant radial mass movement after deposition, forming layered structures similar to those seen on Mars. This movement formed a debris flow that travelled at estimated speeds of tens of metres per second. The ejecta consists of large, disrupted blocks near the crater and smaller, poorly sorted debris farther away. Glassy objects of varying sizes, up to 50 mm (2.0 in) in diameter and resembling meteorite impact melts, have been recovered from the ejecta blanket. Impact glass is preserved mainly on older, undisturbed surfaces as erosion and agricultural activity has resulted in the removal of much of the ejecta to the south and southwest.

The lake lacks an outflow, resulting in high concentrations of dissolved minerals. Its water is alkaline, with reported pH values generally ranging from about 9 to 10.5, although pH and other chemical characteristics vary spatially and seasonally.

== Biodiversity ==
Lake water changing colour from green to reddish-pink in June 2020

Despite its high salinity and alkalinity, the lake supports a diverse community of microorganisms, such as bacteria, archaea, micro-eukaryotes, and phytoplankton. Several species of bacteria have been reported from the lake, including several species first described from Lonar Lake. These include Nitritalea halalkaliphila, Indibacter alkaliphilus, Cecembia lonarensis, Georgenia satyanarayanai, Cohaesibacter haloalkalitolerans, and Nesterenkonia cremea. The new fungal species Curvularia lonarensis was described from water samples collected from the lake. Dense blooms of cyanobacteria, such as of the genus Arthrospira, give the lake its characteristic green colour. In early June 2020, the lake changed from its characteristic green colour to a reddish-pink colour within two to three days. Studies suggested that increased salinity associated with low water levels favoured the growth of Halobacterium and increased carotenoid levels, which in turn led to colour change.

The area surrounding the lake supports diverse wildlife and vegetation, sustained by freshwater springs. Tectona grandis, Wrightia tinctoria, Butea monosperma, and Helicteres isora occur on the crater slopes, while thorny shrubs such as Acacia nilotica and species of Ziziphus occur in the surrounding vegetation. Non-native Neltuma juliflora is widespread on the lakeshore. A total of 12 species of mammals, 160 species of birds, and 46 species of reptiles have been reported from the area surrounding the lake. These include the grey wolf (Canis lupus), Indian gazelle (Gazella bennettii), common langur (Semnopithecus entellus), Indian grey mongoose (Urva edwardsii), barking deer (Muntiacus muntjak), Asian woollyneck (Ciconia episcopus), common pochard (Aythya ferina), Ruddy shelduck (Tadorna ferruginea), black-winged stilt (Himantopus himantopus), Brahminy duck (Tadorna ferruginea), red-wattled lapwing (Vanellus indicus), Indian golden oriole (Oriolus kundoo), common tailorbird (Orthotomus sutorius), and baya weaver (Ploceus philippinus). Other animals and birds found in the region include bluejays, hoopoes, barn owls, larks, parakeet, peafowl, bats, snakes, scorpions, monitor lizards, and other amphibians and insects.

== History and religion ==
There are descriptions in the Skanda Purana (8th century) and Ain-i-Akbari (16th century) that have been associated with the lake, although this identification has not been conclusively established. The area surrounding the crater is home to several Hindu temples in the Chalukya and Hemadpanti architectures. These include the partially submerged Shankar Ganesha temple, Ram Gaya temple, Kamalja Devi temple, and Sita Nahani temple. The Daitya Sudan Temple is associated with the legend of Vishnu slaying the asura Lonasura, from whom the name "Lonar" is traditionally said to be derived. The crater was identified in 1823 by a British officer named C.J.E. Alexander.

== Threats and conservation ==
The Lonar Lake is threatened by the use of fertilisers, and pesticides on nearby agricultural fields, as well as littering and sewage dumping, which contribute to water pollution. Illegal logging, deforestation, illicit mining, and commercial construction in the vicinity of the lake have altered the surrounding natural topography.

The Lonar Lake was designated as a National Geological Monument by the Geological Survey of India in 1979. The Government of Maharashtra established the Lonar Wildlife Sanctuary on 8 September 2000 to protect the area surrounding the lake. The lake itself was incorporated into the sanctuary in November 2016. On 21 February 2017, the lake and its surrounding area were designated as an "Eco-sensitive Zone". In November 2020, the lake was designated as a protected Ramsar site. In 2022, the state government announced plans to develop the site as a geo-tourism destination.

== See also ==
Craters in India

- Dhala crater – Impact structure in India
- Luna crater – Impact crater in Luna, Gujarat, India
- Ramgarh crater – Impact crater in Rajasthan
- Shiva crater – Alleged impact crater west of India

Related lists

- List of impact craters on Earth
- List of possible impact structures on Earth
- List of lakes in India
