= Lonar =

- Town
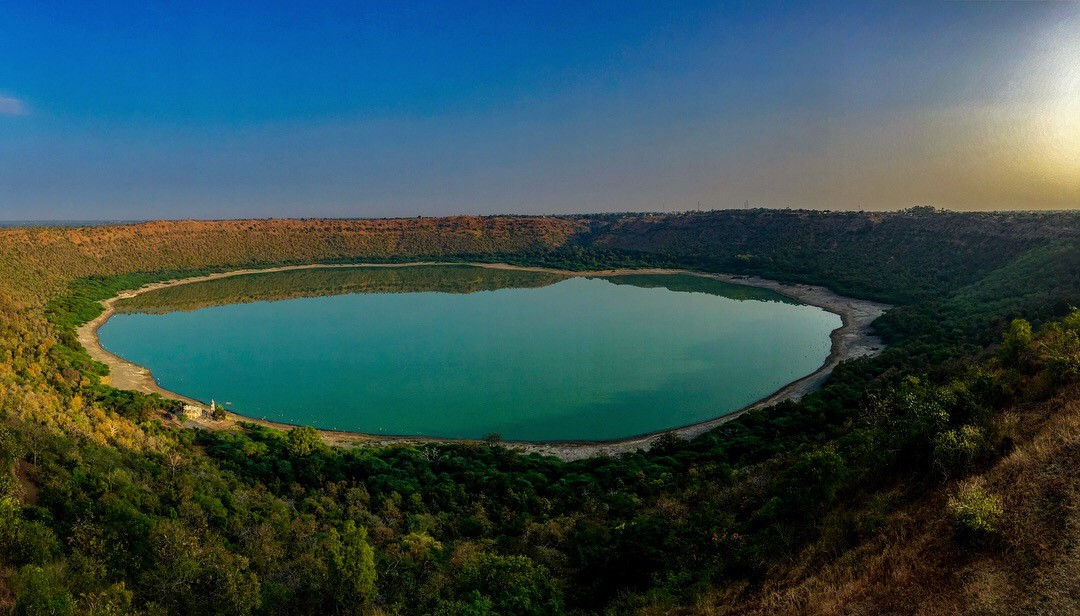
- Aerial view of Lonar crater lake in Buldhana district (Maharashtra)

- Location in Maharashtra, India
- Coordinates: 19.98°N 76.52°E
- Country: India
- State: Maharashtra
- District: Buldhana
- Founder: Indian ecological dept
- Elevation: 563 m (1,847 ft)

Population (2001)
  - Total: 20,082

Languages
  - Official: Marathi
- Time zone: UTC+5:30 (IST)
- PIN: 443302

Lonar is a town, just 79 km from Buldhana and municipal council in Buldhana district of Vidarbha region of the Indian state of Maharashtra. The town is the headquarter of Lonar taluka and is located near Mehkar.

Lonar is famous for Lonar crater and Lonar Lake, which is located at 19°58′N 76°30′E. It is a meteorite crater created in the Pleistocene Epoch. The crater contains salt water lake is 1.8 km in diameter and is about 137 m below the level of the crater rim. A small fresh water stream drains into the lake. Due to evaporite effects, the lake is mineral rich and salty and sodium and potassium salts are extracted from it.

== Geography ==
Lonar is situated around 360 km from Nagpur, around 100 km from Buldhana, around 100 km from Akola, 550 km from Mumbai, around 160 km from Aurangabad and around 140 km southeast of the Ajanta Caves, about 4½ hours drive via Buldhana.

Lonar town is located at 19°59′06″N 76°31′23″E. It has an average elevation of 563 m (1847 feet).

== Demographics ==
As of the 2001 Indian census, Lonar had a population of 20,082. Males constitute 52% of the population and females 48%. Lonar has an average literacy rate of 66%, higher than the national average of 59.5%: male literacy is 74%, and female literacy is 58%. In Lonar, 16% of the population is under 6 years of age.

| Year | Male | Female | Total Population | Change | Religion (%) | | | | | | | |
| Year | Male | Female | Total Population | Change | Hindu | Muslim | Christian | Sikhs | Buddhist | Jain | Other religions and persuasions | Religion not stated |
|---|---|---|---|---|---|---|---|---|---|---|---|---|
| 2001 | 10388 | 9694 | 20082 | - | 55.089 | 32.243 | 0.080 | 0.045 | 8.127 | 4.258 | 0.105 | 0.055 |
| 2011 | 12114 | 11302 | 23416 | 0.166 | 52.985 | 35.194 | 0.056 | 0.004 | 8.071 | 3.557 | 0.004 | 0.128 |

== Lonar crater ==
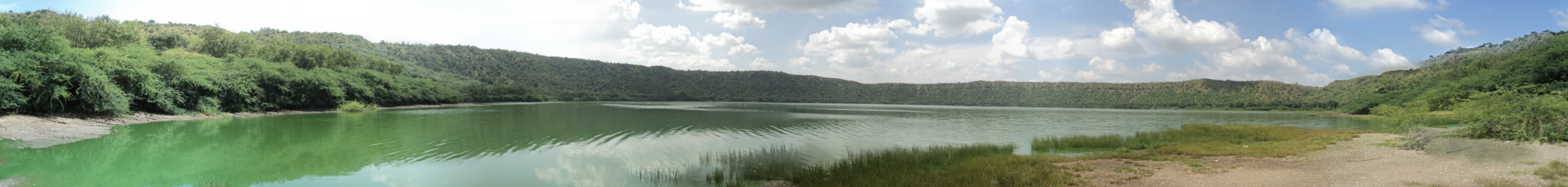
Panoramic view of Lonar Crater

The Lonar crater is the world's only salt water lake in basaltic rock, believed to have been caused by a meteorite hitting Earth around 52,000 years ago. It is surrounded by forests with a large variety of birds, particularly peacocks, owls, red-wattled lapwings and ducks.

=== Flora and fauna ===
Lonar has its own ecological system. As the sun sets, the entire lake appears differently. The lake water sweeps across the shore like sea water, and the birds, wolves, peacocks and other creatures start making their presence felt. It is a good scene to watch the sun rising or setting below the lake walls. The lake has a remarkable presence of splinters of glass confirming the meteorite's impact, which caused the enormous temperature rise thereby turning the sand into glass.

== Ambar lake ==
This lake was formed by a small meteor which might have been separated from the main meteor. Shags

== Temples ==
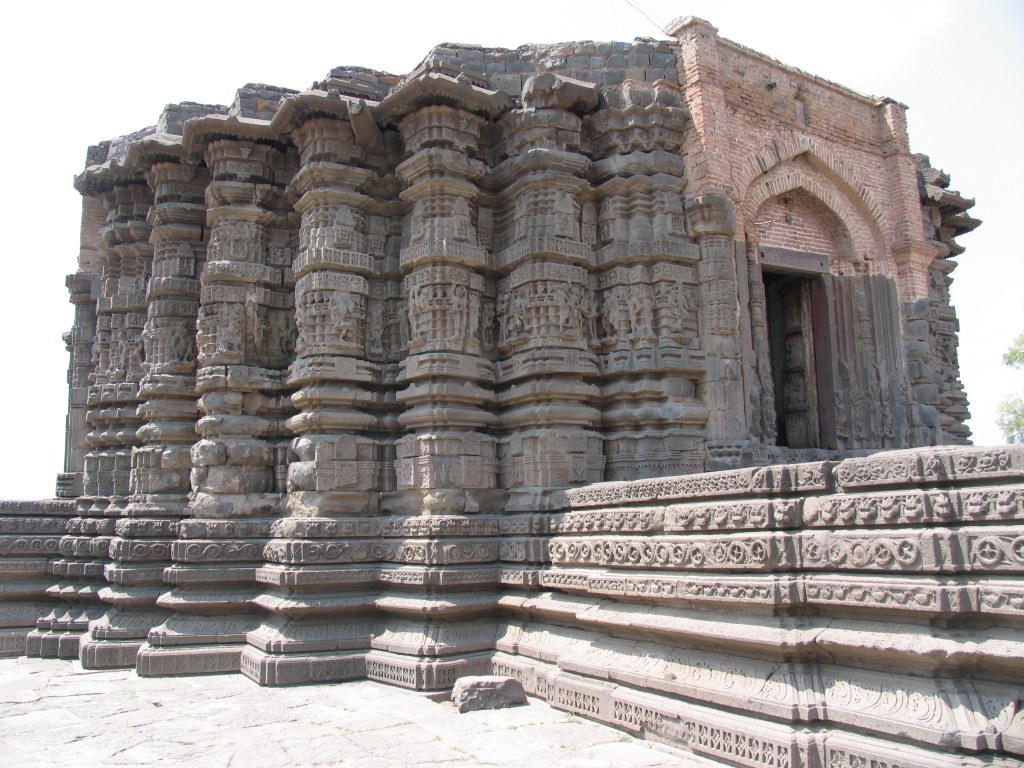
Side profile of the Daitya Sudan temple

Numerous temples surround the lake, around the rim of the crater and further down around the lake, most of which stand in ruins today, except for the temple of Daitya Sudan at the centre of the Lonar town, which was built in honour of Vishnu's victory over the giant Lonasur. It is a fine example of early Hindu architecture. Vishnumandir, Wagh Mahadev, Mora Mahadev, Munglyacha Mandir and Goddess Kamalaja Devia are the other temples found inside the crater.

== Transport and tourism ==
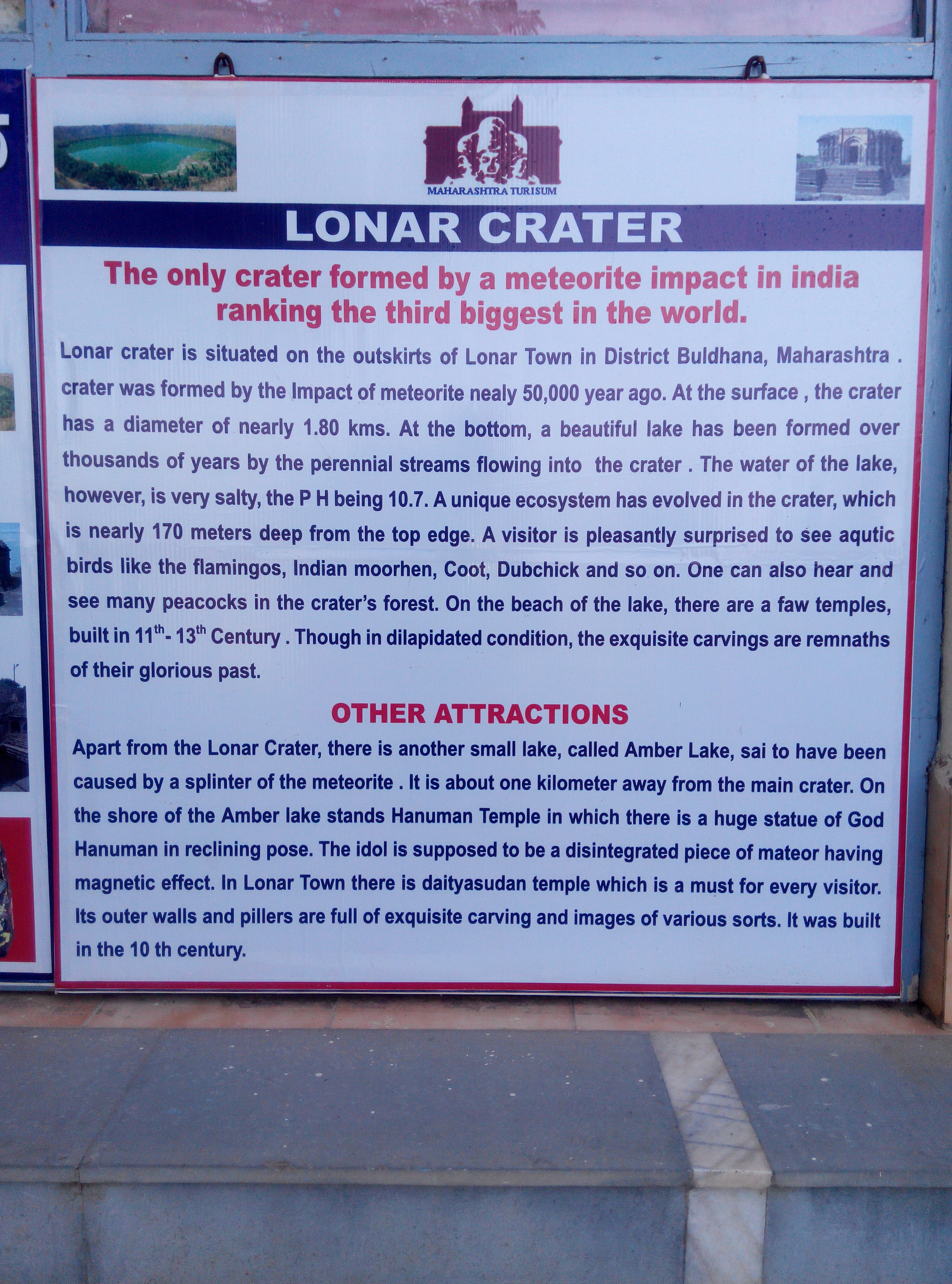
Maharashtra Tourism Information Board at Lonar Crater depicting information about the same

The nearest train stations are Shegaon near Khamgaon and Malkapur near Bhusawal railway-junction, on the Howrah–Nagpur–Mumbai line of Central Railway of Indian Railways and is around 100 km from Lonar. Buses also run to Lonar from Nagpur, Akola, Buldhana, Malkapur, Jalna and Nanded.

If travelling from Nagpur, one must take a bus till Mehkar near Washim and then head to Lonar. From Mumbai or Pune, the most convenient route is to first reach Aurangabad via bus (Mumbai and Pune) or train/flight (from Mumbai only) and then take a state transport bus to Lonar. From Pune, air-conditioned and regular buses run every hour from the Shivajinagar bus stand to Aurangabad.

Maharashtra Tourism runs a resort just 50 meters from the lake. The property is affordable, modern, and well-maintained. There are also several decent and budget-friendly lodges available in the town.

The food available in Lonar has influence from both Khandesh and Marathwada cuisines. It is unique and simple but spicy.
