= List of people from Nagpur =

The following is a list of notable people from and/or related to Nagpur, India.

== Academia ==
- Surendra Sheodas Barlingay (1919–1997), logician and Marathi writer
- Vidyadhar Johrapurkar, Sanskritist, social anthropologist and historian
- D. Raghavarao (1938–2013), Indian statistician, known for his contributions in design of experiments
- Sharadchandra Shankar Shrikhande (1917–2020), mathematician

== Activism, civil rights, and philanthropy ==
- Moreshwar Vasudeo Abhyankar (1886–1935), lawyer and freedom fighter
- Nirmala Deshpande (1929–2008), social activist
- Ram Ingole, social activist
- Shankar Mahale (1925–1943), young revolutionary
- R. K. Patil (1907–2007), Gandhian and freedom fighter
- Ram Puniyani, communal harmonist
- Varun Shrivastava, social activist

== Art, literature ==
- Gopalakrishna Adiga (1918–1992), Kannada poet
- Raja Badhe (1912–1977), Marathi poet
- Suresh Bhat (1932–2003), Marathi poet and ghazal poet
- Purushottam Bhaskar Bhave (1910–1980), Marathi writer
- Neelam Saxena Chandra, children's poet
- Eknath Easwaran (1910–1999), writer and spiritual teacher
- Mahesh Elkunchwar, playwright
- Vasudeo S. Gaitonde (1924–2001), abstract painter
- Ram Ganesh Gadkari (1885–1919), Marathi poet
- Manik Sitaram Godghate (Grace) (1937–2012), Marathi poet
- Dhanashree Halbe, translator, poet and children's writer
- Gauri Jog, Kathak dancer
- Shahid Kabir (1932–2001), Urdu-language poet
- Akshaykumar Kale, modern Marathi poetry critic
- Indra Bahadur Khare (1922–1953), Hindi poet
- Vishnu Bhikaji Kolte (1908–1998), Marathi writer; former vice-chancellor of Nagpur University
- Bhau Panchbhai (1944–2016), Marathi poet, writer, and Dalit activist
- Harishankar Parsai (1924–1995), Hindi writer
- Shishir Parkhie, ghazal singer and composer
- Wasudev Waman Patankar (1908–1997), Marathi shayar

== Business ==
- Jamnalal Bajaj (1889–1942), founder of the Bajaj Group
- Dinesh Keskar, president of Boeing Asia and vice-president of Boeing International
- Vikram Pandit, former chief executive officer of Citigroup
- Subramaniam Ramadorai, vice-chairman of Tata Consultancy Services
- Chandir Khemchandani, Partner and CEO, PEB360 Solutions LLP

=== Street vendor ===
- Dolly Chaiwala

== Film industry ==
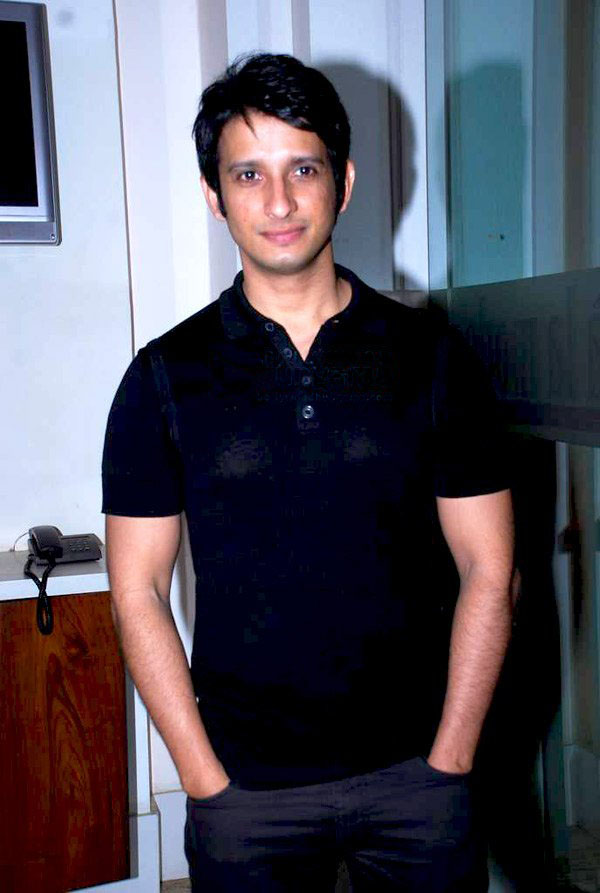
Sharman Joshi

- Jyoti Amge, actress and shortest woman currently alive
- Tarun Bose (1928–1972), actor
- Basanta Choudhury (1928–2000), actor
- Purushottam Darvhekar (1926–1999), playwright and songwriter
- Vaishnavi Dhanraj, television actress
- Mahesh Elkunchwar, playwright
- Subhash Ghai, film director, producer and screenwriter
- Sai Gundewar, actor
- Samidha Guru, Marathi theater, film and television actress
- Sharman Joshi, actor
- Rajkumar Hirani, film director, screenwriter and film editor
- Gayatri Joshi, model turned Bollywood actress
- Paras Kalnawat, Hindi television and web actor
- Abhijit Kokate, film editor and Bollywood director
- Ketaki Mategaonkar, Marathi playback singer and Marathi cinema actress
- Jag Mundhra (1948–2011), filmmaker
- Manava Naik, actress
- Salim Nasir (1944–1989), Pakistani actor
- Girija Oak, Marathi and Hindi film actress
- Shiv Panditt, Bollywood actor
- Piyush Ranade, Marathi film and television actor
- Ronit Roy, television actor
- Ruchi Savarn, television actress
- Aarti Shrivastava, documentary filmmaker
- Sunaina, Tamil actress
- Sanjay Surkar (1959–2012), Marathi film director
- Vaibbhav Tatwawdi, Marathi actor
- Tejas Prabha Vijay Deoskar, bollywood and Marathi director

== Health and medicine ==
- Zulekha Daud, physician-turned-entrepreneur; founder and chairperson of Zulekha Healthcare Group, including Zulekha Hospital UAE; Alexis Multispeciality Hospital, India and Zulekha Colleges, India
- Kamalabai Hospet (1896–1981), co-founder of Matru Sewa Sangh, and Vidya Shikshan Prasarak Mandal
- Vikram Marwah, orthopedic surgeon, social worker, and founder of Handicapped Children's Rehabilitation Centre and Children's Orthopedic Hospital of Matru Sewa Sangh
- Dr. Kshama Metre, founder of the Chinmaya Organization for Rural Development

== Marketing and sales ==
- Sanjay Arora
- Sanjay Singh
- Saiyed Farhan

== Military and policing ==
- Shirish Baban Deo, Vice Chief of the Air Staff of the Indian Air Force
- Suryakant Chintaman Chafekar, Air Vice Marshall
- Edgar Peacock (1893–1955), decorated British Army officer
- Hemant Karkare (1954–2008), chief of the Mumbai Anti-Terrorist Squad
- Ghulam Mansoor Subedar-major and scholar
- Manoj Pande, Chief of the Army Staff of the Indian Army

== Modeling ==
- Manasi Moghe, Miss India Universe 2013
- Lopamudra Raut, model and Miss United Continents 2016
- Madhu Sapre, Miss India Universe 1992

== Music ==
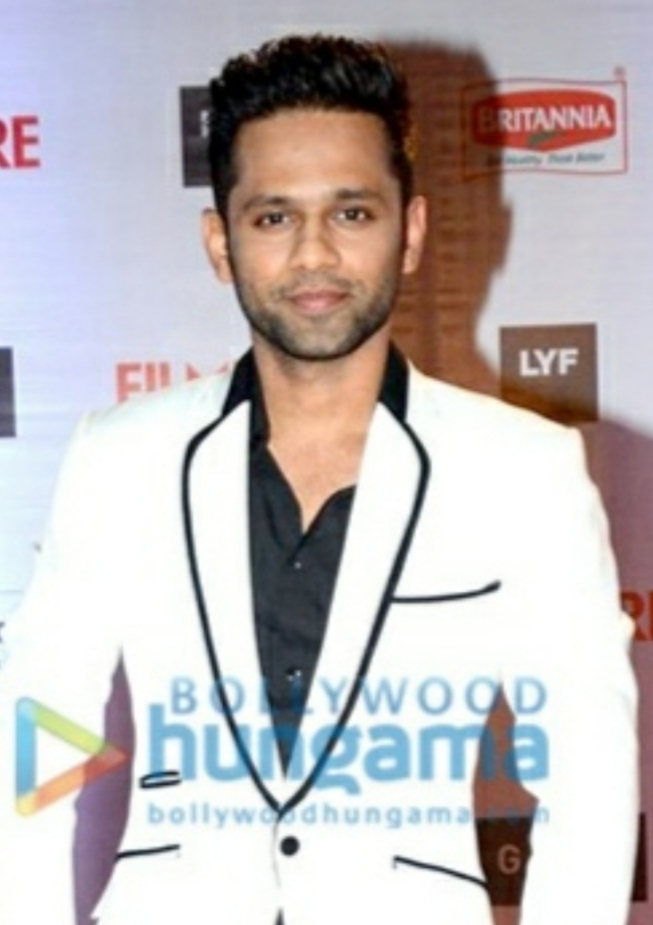
Rahul Vaidya

- Varsha Bhosle (1956–2012), singer and journalist
- Vasantrao Deshpande (1920–1983), Hindustani classical vocalist and performer of Natya Sangeet
- Ulhas Kashalkar, Hindustani classical vocalist
- Shishir Parkhie, playback ghazal bhajan singer and composer
- Avinash Balkrishna Patwardhan, musicologist
- Altaf Raja, singer
- Pandit Sudhir, sitar player of Hindustani classical music
- Usha Timothy, playback singer
- Rahul Vaidya, singer
- Vidyadhar Vyas, Hindustani classical vocalist

== Politics and government ==
- Madhav Shrihari Aney (1880–1968), politician
- Mohite Subodh Baburao, member of 14th Lok Sabha
- Bakht Buland Shah, founder and ruler of gond Kingdom of Nagpur
- Ardhendu Bhushan Bardhan (1924–2016), politician
- C. B. Bhave, financial regulator
- Raghoji I Bhonsle (1695–1755), Maratha general who took control of the Nagpur Kingdom in east-central India during the reign of Chattrapati Shahu
- Mudhoji II Bhonsle (?–1840), ruler of the Kingdom of Nagpur
- Raghoji II of Nagpur, Maratha ruler of the Kingdom of Nagpur in Central India from 1788 to 1816
- Baka Bai (1774–1858), Maratha stateswoman and favourite wife of Raghoji II Bhonsle, the king of Nagpur
- Raghuji Bhonsle III (c.1806–1853), ruler of the Principal States of Nagpur from 1818 to 1853
- Gangadhar Rao Chitnavis (1862–?), president of First and Second Legislative Council of Central Provinces
- Shankar Madhav Chitnavis (1867–?), deputy commissioner of Central Provinces
- Swati Dandekar, Democratic member of the Iowa Utilities Board
- Pravin Datke, former mayor of Nagpur, current BJP Nagpur City president
- Bhavna Kardam Dave, member of 12th Lok Sabha
- Narendra R Deoghare, member of 4th Lok Sabha
- Madhukar Dattatraya Deoras (1915–1996), third Sarsanghchalak of the Rashtriya Swayamsevak Sangh
- Ashish Deshmukh, member of 13th Maharashtra Legislative Assembly
- Ranjeet Deshmukh, member of 10th Maharashtra Legislative Assembly
- Sudhakar Deshmukh, member of 13th Maharashtra Legislative Assembly
- Devendra Fadnavis, Chief Minister of Maharashtra
- Parinay Fuke, member of the Maharashtra Legislative Council
- Nitin Gadkari, Union Minister and former President of the Bharatiya Janata Party
- Ramchandra Martand Hajarnavis, councillor and member of 4th Lok Sabha
- K. B. Hedgewar (1889–1940), founding Sarsanghachalak of the Rashtriya Swayamsevak Sangh
- Justice Mohammad Hidayatullah (1905–1992), Vice-President of India; former Chief Justice of India
- Shrikant Jichkar (1953–2004), politician, civil servant
- Sanjay Joshi, politician of the Bharatiya Janata Party, former national general secretary (organisation)
- Narayan Bhaskar Khare (1884–1970), member of the Indian National Congress
- Jogendra Kawade, founder and President of Peoples Republican Party
- Saroj Khaparde, member of Rajya Sabha
- Krishna Khopde, member of the 13th Maharashtra Legislative Assembly
- Vikas Kumbhare, member of the 13th Maharashtra Legislative Assembly
- Vikas Mahatme, member of the Rajya Sabha
- Milind Mane, member of the 13th Maharashtra Legislative Assembly
- Sameer Meghe, member of the 13th Maharashtra Legislative Assembly
- Gargi Shankar Mishra, member of 8th Lok Sabha
- Rajendra Mulak, former Minister of State for Finance & Planning, Energy, Water Resources, Parliamentary Affairs and State Excise
- Vilas Muttemwar, former Minister of State of the Ministry of New and Renewable Energy of India
- Avinash Pandey, member of the Maharashtra Legislative Assembly
- Vinod Gudadhe Patil, former Minister in the Narayan Rane ministry
- Shantaram Potdukhe, former Member of Parliament and Union Minister of State, Finance
- Rajani Rai, former Lieutenant Governor of Pondicherry
- P. V. Narasimha Rao (1921–2004), former Prime Minister of India
- Nitin Raut, Energy Minister
- N. K. P. Salve (1921–2012), Minister of State and BCCI president
- Ajay Sancheti, former member of Rajya Sabha
- Vasant Sathe (1925–2011), former Minister of Information and Broadcasting
- V Satish, National Jt. General Secretary of Bharatiya Janata Party
- Abdul Shafee (1925-2004), former Indian National Congress politician
- Rajendra Shingne, state vice-president of Nationalist Congress Party
- Anil Sole, Member of Legislative Council, Nagpur graduates constituency
- Sumatitai Sukaklikar (?–2011), a leader of Bharatiya Janata Party
- Vimla Verma, member of 12th Lok Sabha
- Mukul Wasnik, General Secretary of the Indian National Congress; former Union Minister

== Religion and spirituality ==
- Tajuddin Muhammad Badruddin (1861–1925), Muslim Sufi master
- Eyre Chatterton (1863–1950), Anglican bishop
- Madhav Sadashiv Golwalkar (1906–1973), second Sarsanghchalak (Supreme Leader) of Rashtriya Swayamsevak Sangh
- Alec Hardy (1891–1970), Anglican bishop
- Keshav Baliram Hedgewar (1889–1940), founder of Rashtriya Swayamsevak Sangh
- Mufti Zameen Misbahi, Ismamic scholar
- Eknath Ranade (1914–1982), founder of Vivekananda Kendra
- George Sinker (1900–1986), Anglican bishop
- Alex Wood (1871–1937), Anglican bishop

== Science ==
- Ramanath Cowsik, astrophysicist
- Ramesh Jain, scientist, professor and entrepreneur in the field of computer science
- Yashavant Kanetkar, computer scientist largely responsible for popularizing the C programming language in the whole of India; author of several computer books, including Let Us C
- Shekhar C. Mande, Shanti Swaroop Bhatnagar Award winner; scientist in the field of x-ray crystallography and biophysics
- S. Pancharatnam (1934–1969), physicist

== Sport ==
- Anilkumar Abhayankar, cricketer
- Malvika Bansod, badminton player
- Divya Deshmukh, chess player and Grandmaster (GM)
- Shashank Manohar, lawyer; president of the Board of Control for Cricket in India (BCCI)
- Mona Meshram, international cricket player
- C. K. Nayudu (1895–1967), first captain of the India national cricket team in Test matches
- Arundhati Pantawane, international badminton player
- R. T. Ramachandran, former cricket umpire
- Raunak Sadhwani, chess grandmaster
- N.K.P. Salve (1921–2012), former BCCI chief
- Rohit Sharma, cricketer
- Azhar Sheikh, cricketer
- Yash Thakur, cricketer (playing for Lucknow Super Giants in IPL)
- Prashant Vaidya, former cricketer
- S. K. Wankhede (1914–1988), former BCCI president
- Umesh Yadav, cricketer

== See also ==
- List of people from Maharashtra
- List of Marathi people
