= 1914 Birthday Honours =

National awards given by King George V

The 1914 Birthday Honours were appointments in the British Empire of King George V to various orders and honours to reward and highlight good works by citizens. The appointments were made to celebrate the official birthday of The King, and were published on 19 June 1914.

The recipients of honours are displayed here as they were styled before their new honour, and arranged by honour, with classes (Knight, Knight Grand Cross, etc.) and then divisions (Military, Civil, etc.) as appropriate.

== British Empire ==
=== Order of the Garter ===
- Right Honourable William, Earl Beauchamp, K.C.M.G.

=== Order of the Thistle ===
- Arthur FitzGerald, Baron Kinnaird

=== The Most Honourable Order of the Bath ===
==== Knight Grand Cross of the Order of the Bath (GCB) ====
Military Division

- Admiral Sir Reginald Friend Hannam Henderson, K.C.B., retired.
- General Sir Francis Reginald Wingate, G.C.V.O., K.C.B., K.C.M.G., D.S.O., Sirdar, Egyptian Army, and Governor-General, Sudan Administration.
- General Sir Arthur Singleton Wynne, K.C.B., Retired Pay, Colonel, The King's Own (Yorkshire Light Infantry), and Keeper of the Jewel House, Tower of London.

Civil Division

- The Right Honourable Herbert John, Viscount Gladstone, G.C.M.G.

==== Knight Commander of the Order of the Bath (KCB) ====
Military Division

- Rear-Admiral David Beatty, C.B., M.V.O., D.S.O.
- Surgeon-General Arthur William May, C.B., K.H.P.
- Rear-Admiral Richard Henry Peirse, C.B., M.V.O.
- Admiral Ernest Rice, retired.
- Vice-Admiral the Honourable Sir Alexander Edward Bethell, K.C.M.G.
- Lieutenant-General Herbert Eversley Belfield, C.B., D.S.O., Retired Pay, Colonel, The Duke of Wellington's (West Riding Regiment).
- Lieutenant-General Ernest De Brath, C.B, C.I.E., Retired Pay, Indian Army.
- Lieutenant-General Sir Malcolm Henry Stanley Grover, K.C.I.E., C.B., Indian Army, Commanding 4th (Quetta) Division, India.
- Colonel (temporary Brigadier-General) David Henderson, C.B., D.S.O., Director-General of Military Aeronautics, War Office.
- Colonel (local and temporary Major-General) Stanley Brenton von Donop, C.B., Master-General of the Ordnance and Fourth Military Member of the Army Council.

Civil Division

- Sir John Macdonell, C.B., King's Remembrancer.
- Richard Augustine Studdert Redmayne, Esq., C.B., Chief Inspector of Mines, Home Office.
- Sir Thomas William Holderness, K.C.S.I., Under-Secretary of State for India.

==== Companion of the Order of the Bath (CB) ====
Military Division

- Colonel (temporary Brigadier-General) Herbert Guthrie Smith, Director of Artillery, War Office.
- Colonel Alexander William Roper, Chief Engineer, South Africa.
- Colonel George Francis William St. John, halfpay, late Royal Artillery.
- Colonel (temporary Brigadier-General) The Honourable Cecil Edward Bingham, C.V.O., Commanding 4th Cavalry Brigade.
- Colonel William Hickie, Assistant Quartermaster-General, Irish Command.
- Colonel Francis John De Gex, Assistant Adjutant-General, Irish Command.
- Colonel Robert Scott-Kerr, M.V.O., D.S.O., Commanding Grenadier Guards and Regimental District.
- Colonel Archibald John Chapman, General Staff Officer, 1st Grade, Northern Command.
- Colonel Charles Henry Uvedale Price, D.S.O., Indian Army.
- Colonel Gilbert Walter Palin, C.I.E., Supply and Transport Corps, India.
- Colonel Courtenay Clarke Manifold, M.B., Indian Medical Service.
- Colonel William George Walker, V.C., Commandant, 1st Battalion, 4th Gurkha Rifles, Indian Army.
- Colonel (temporary Brigadier-General) Havelock Hudson, C.I.E., General Staff, Northern Army, India.
- Lieutenant-Colonel William Rice Edwards, C.M.G., M.D., Indian Medical Service.

Civil Division

- Rear-Admiral Dudley Rawson Stratford de Chair, M.V.O.
- Captain Philip Wylie Dumas, C.V.O., R.N.
- Captain Frederic Charles Dreyer, R.N.
- Commander Mansfield George Smith-Cumming, R.N., retired.
- Commander Cecil Ryther Acklom, R.N., retired.
- Paymaster-in-Chief Frederick James Krabbe, R.N.
- Lieutenant-Colonel and Honorary Colonel Frederick John Smith, V.D., Territorial Force Reserve, 8th Battalion, The Cameronians (Scottish Rifles).
- Major Charles Hotham Montagu Doughty-Wylie, C.M.G., Member of the Albanian Delimitation Commission.
- The Honourable James Eric Drummond, Private Secretary to the Prime Minister.
- Sir Guy Francis Laking, Bart., M.V.O., Keeper of the King's Armoury and Curator of the London Museum.
- The Honourable Gerald William Lascelles, Deputy Surveyor, New Forest.
- Herbert James Read, Esq., C.M.G., Principal Clerk, Colonial Office.
- William Henry Whiting, Esq., Superintendent of Construction Accounts and Contract Work, Admiralty.

=== Order of the Star of India ===
==== Knight Commander (KCSI) ====
- His Excellency Sardar Arfa, Amir Nuyan Sheikh Khazal Khan ibn Haji Jabir Khatij K.C.I.E., Sheikh of Mohammera. (Honorary)
- Sheikh Mubarak-bin-Subah, K.C.I.E., Ruler of Koweit.(Honorary)
- Michael William Fenton, Esq., C.S.I, Indian Civil Service, Financial Commissioner, Punjab.
- Sir Harold Arthur Stuart, K.C.V.O., C.S.I., Indian Civil Service, an Ordinary Member of the Council of the Governor of Fort St. George.
- Colonel Sidney Gerald Burrard, C.S.I, F.R.S., R.E., Surveyor-General in India.

==== Companion (CSI) ====
- Sheikh Esa bin Ali al Khalifa, Chief of Bahrein. (Honorary)
- Sardar Daljit Singh of Jullundur, Honorary Magistrate and an Additional Member of the Council of the Governor-General of India for making Laws and Regulations.
- Lieutenant-Colonel Raj Kumar Bir Bikram Singh, C.I.E., Commandant of the Imperial Service Sappers of the Sirmur State, Punjab.
- Walter Maude, Esq., Indian Civil Service, Temporary Member of the Executive Council of the Lieutenant-Governor, Bihar and Orissa.
- Bertram Sausmarez Carey, Esq., C.I.E., V.D., Burma Commission, Commissioner of the Sagaing Division, Burma.
- Michael Nethersole, Esq., Public Works Department, Inspector-General of Irrigation, Government of India.
- Henry Ashbrooke Crump, Esq., Indian Civil Service, Financial Commissioner, Central Provinces, India.
- William James Reid, Esq., Indian Civil Service, Chief Secretary to the Chief Commissioner, Assam, and a Member of the Council of the Chief Commissioner of Assam for making Laws and Regulations.
- Mysore Kantharaj Urs, Esq., Member of the Mysore State Council.
- Oswald Vivian Bosanquet, Esq., C.I.E., Indian Civil Service, Political Department, Government of India, Agent to the Governor-General in Central India.
- Walter Gunnell Wood, Esq., Chief Engineer and Secretary to Government in the Public Works Department, Buildings, Roads and Railways Branches, United Provinces of Agra and Oudh, and a Member of the Council of the Lieutenant-Governor for making Laws and Regulations.
- John Cornwallis Godley, Esq., M.A., Indian Educational Department, Director of Public Instruction, Punjab, and a Member of the Council of the Lieutenant-Governor of the Punjab for making Laws and Regulations.

=== Order of Saint Michael and Saint George ===
==== Knight Grand Cross of the Order of St Michael and St George (GCMG) ====
- The Right Honourable the Earl of Liverpool, K.C.M.G., M.V.O., Governor and Commander-in-Chief of the Dominion of New Zealand.
- The Right Honourable Robert Laird Borden, Prime Minister of the Dominion of Canada.
- General Sir Henry Macleod Leslie Rundle, R.A., G.C.B., G.C.V.O., K.C.M.G., D.S.O., Governor and Commander-in-Chief of the Island of Malta.
- Admiral Sir Day Hort Bosanquet, G.C.V.O., K.C.B., late Governor of the State of South Australia.
- His Excellency the Right Honourable Sir William Conyngham Greene, K.C.B., His Majesty's Ambassador Extraordinary and Plenipotentiary to His Majesty the Emperor of Japan.

==== Knight Commander of the Order of St Michael and St George (KCMG) ====
- Walter Edward Davidson, Esq., C.M.G., Governor and Commander-in-Chief of the Colony of Newfoundland.
- George Smith, Esq., C.M.G., Governor and Commander-in-Chief of the Nyasaland Protectorate.
- The Honourable George Eulas Foster, LL.D., Minister of Trade and Commerce of the Dominion of Canada.
- The Honourable William Hill Irvine, LL.D., K.C., Attorney-General of the Commonwealth of Australia.
- Sir Benjamin Robertson, K.C.S.I., C.I.E., Chief Commissioner of the Central Provinces of India; in recognition of his services in connection with the Indian Enquiry Commission in the Union of South Africa.
- Major-General Alexander John Godley, C.B., General Officer Commanding the Military Forces of the Dominion of New Zealand.
- The Honourable Charles Eugene Boucher De Boucherville, C.M.G., Senator of the Dominion of Canada.
- William Hepworth Mercer, Esq., C.M.G., one of the Crown Agents for the Colonies.
- Lieutenant-Colonel George Lancelot Eyles, C.M.G., M.Inst.C.E., Consulting Engineer for Railways to the Crown Agents for the Colonies.
- Murdoch Macdonald, Esq., C.M.G., M.Inst.C.E., Under Secretary of State for Public Works, Egypt.

==== Companion of the Order of St Michael and St George (CMG) ====
- William Barlow, Esq., LL.D., Vice-Chancellor of the University of Adelaide.
- Gilbert Edmund Augustine Grindle, Esq., M.A., of the Colonial Office.
- Gysbert Reitz Hofmeyr, Esq., Clerk of the House of Assembly of the Union of South Africa.
- James Rankine Leisk, Esq., Secretary for Finance, Union of South Africa.
- Reginald Popham Lobb, Esq., Colonial Secretary and Registrar-General of the Bermudas or Somers Islands.
- William Kirkpatrick McNaught, Esq., Member of the Legislative Assembly of the Province of Ontario.
- Major Harry Claude Moorhouse, D.S.O., Secretary, Southern Provinces, Nigeria.
- Colonel John William Parnell, District Commandant, 3rd Military District, Commonwealth of Australia.
- Christopher James Parr, Esq., Mayor of the City of Auckland, in the Dominion of New Zealand.
- Albert Edward Stephenson, Esq., Director of Colonial Audit.
- Reginald Edward Stubbs, Esq., Colonial Secretary of the Island of Ceylon.
- Lieutenant-Colonel George Llewellyn Douglas Swain, Inspector-General of Constabulary, and Commandant of Local Forces of the Trinidad and Tobago.
- Christopher Alexander Sapara Williams, Esq., Unofficial Member of the Legislative Council of the Colony of Nigeria.
- His Highness Mohamed Jemalulalam bin Almerhum Sultan Hashim Jalilulalam Akamuddin, Sultan of Brunei. (Honorary)
- Frank Gerard Clemow, Esq., M.D., British Delegate to the Ottoman Board of Health.
- Harry Halton Fox, Esq., His Majesty's Consul-General at Chengtu.
- Ernest Miles Hobart-Hampden, Esq., Japanese Secretary to His Majesty's Embassy at Tokio.
- Thomas Beaumont Hohler, Esq., First Secretary in His Majesty's Legation in Mexico.
- Arthur King Lewis, Esq., Director-General, Egyptian Customs Administration.
- Henry Edward Sly, Esq., His Majesty's Consul at Harbin.
- Major Lee Oliver Fitzmaurice Stack, Civil Secretary to the Soudan Government.

=== Order of the Indian Empire ===
==== Knight Commander (KCIE) ====
- Brian Egerton, Esq., C.I.E., Controller-General of Paigahs, Hyderabad.
- Maharaja Girija Nath Ray Bahadur of Dinajpur, Bengal.
- Stephen George Sale, Esq., M.A., Barrister-at-Law, Legal Adviser and Solicitor to the Secretary of State for India.

==== Companion (CIE) ====
- Lieutenant-Colonel William Molesworth, M.B., B.Sc., Indian Medical Service, Surgeon, 1st District, and Superintendent, Medical School, Rayapuram, Madras.
- Phillip Glynn Messent, Esq., M.I.C.E., Chief Engineer to the Bombay Port Trust.
- Lalubhai Samaldas Mehta, Esq., an Additional Member of the Council of the Governor of Bombay for making Laws and Regulations.
- Leonard Birley, Esq., Indian Civil Service, Magistrate and Collector of Dacca, Bengal.
- Babu Mohendra Nath Ray, Vakil of the High Court of Judicature in Fort William, Bengal, and an Additional Member of the Council of the Governor of Bengal for making Laws and Regulations.
- Frank Frederick Lyall, Esq., Indian Civil Service, Magistrate and Collector of Muzaffarpur, Bihar and Orissa.
- Lieutenant-Colonel George James Hamilton Bell, M.B., Indian Medical Service, Inspector-General of Prisons, Burma.
- Frank Currie Lowie, Esq., Public Works Department, India, Executive Engineer, Seniku-Htawgaw Road Extension, Burma.
- Lewis French, Esq., Indian Civil Service, Chief Minister, Kapurthala State, Punjab.
- Colonel Sidney Mercer Renny, R.A., Director of Ordnance Factories, India.
- Captain Walter Hugh Jeffery, 73rd Carnatic Infantry, Indian Army, General Staff Officer, 3rd Grade, Army Headquarters, India.
- Richard Meredith, Esq., Indian Telegraph Department, Director of Telegraphs, India.
- Albert Howard, Esq., M.A., Imperial Economic Botanist at Pusa, Bengal.
- Major Edward David Wilson Greig, M.B., B.Sc., Indian Medical Service, Assistant Director, Central Research Institute, Kasauli.
- Harold Arden Close, Esq., Indian Police, Inspector-General of Police, North-West Frontier Province, India.
- Richard Hugh Tickell, Esq., M.I.C.E., Public Works Department, India, Chief Engineer, Central Provinces, lately Superintending Engineer, Swat River Canals Circle, North-West Frontier Province, India.
- Francis Samuel Alfred Slocock, Esq., Indian Civil Service, Inspector-General of Police, Central Provinces and Berar.
- Lieutenant-Colonel Fitzwarren Lloyd, V.D., Commandant, Assam Valley Light Horse.
- Major Arthur Leslie Jacob, Indian Army, Political Agent, Zhob, Baluchistan.
- Nawab Khair Bakhsh, Khan Bahadur, Tumandar of the Mari Tribe, Baluchistan.
- Thomas Summers, Esq., D.Sc., M.I.C.E., late Bombay Public Works Department.
- Henry James Wakely Fry, Esq., Director-General of Stores, India Office.
- Haji Muhammad Ali, Rais-ut-Tujjar, of Mohammera. (Honorary)

=== Royal Victorian Order ===
==== Knight Grand Cross of the Royal Victorian Order (GCVO) ====
- Granville George, Earl Granville, C.V.O., Lord-in-Waiting to The King.

==== Knight Commander of the Royal Victorian Order (KCVO) ====
- The Rev. Canon Edgar Sheppard, C.V.O., D.D., Sub-Dean of the Chapels Royal.
- Major-General Frederick Spencer Robb, C.B., M.V.O., Major-General-in-Charge of Administration, Aldershot Command.

==== Commander of the Royal Victorian Order (CVO) ====
- Lionel Henry Cust, Esq., M.V.O., Surveyor of The King's Pictures and Works of Art.
- James Sant, Esq., R.A., Portrait Painter to Queen Victoria.

==== Member of the Royal Victorian Order, 4th class ====
- Major Robert Joseph Atkinson Terry, Royal Sussex Regiment, Provost Marshal, Aldershot.
- Harold Robert Dacre Spitta, Esq., M.D., Bacteriologist to His Majesty's Household.

==== Member of the Royal Victorian Order, 5th class ====
- Herbert George Sotheby, Esq., of the Private Secretary's Office, Buckingham Palace.
- William Richard Codling, Esq., of His Majesty's Stationery Office.

=== Companions of the Imperial Service Order ===
Home Civil Service

- William Elliott, Collector of Customs and Excise, Glasgow.
- William Evans, Chief Examiner and Visiting Inspector of Contracts, War Office.
- William Richard Kerr, Principal Clerk, Office of Works.
- William George Newton, Deputy Controller, Stationery Office.
- John Tenney, Principal Clerk, Exchequer and Audit Department.

Colonial Civil Service

- Richard Hallowes Addison, Chief Native Commissioner, Natal, Union of South Africa.
- Francis Cyrus Berteau, Comptroller and Auditor-General of the Colony of Newfoundland.
- Alexander Malcolm Campbell, Government Secretary, Territory of Papua.
- William Himsworth, Deputy Minister of Inland Revenue, Dominion of Canada.
- Henry Turner Machin, Assistant Treasurer of the Province of Quebec.
- George Cowie Morrison, Public Service Commissioner of the State of Victoria.
- Thomas Ronayne, lately General Manager of the New Zealand Railways.
- Ernest Daniel Rowland, MB, lately Resident Surgeon, Public Hospital, Georgetown, Colony of British Guiana.
- William Sutherland, lately Native Commissioner of the Colony of Fiji.
- John Trump, MInstCE, lately Director of Public Works, Federated Malay States.
- Haig Apisoghom Sdepan Utidjian, Translator of State Documents, Chief Secretary's Office, and Turkish Translator to the Legislative Council, Cyprus.
- William Marshall Vaudin, Superintendent of Public Works and Surveys, Colony of Seychelles.

Indian Civil Service

- William Houston Treasure, late Assistant Solicitor to the Secretary of State for India.
- Edward Holroyd Gadsden, Superintendent, Central Jail, Coimbatore, Madras.
- Manmatha Nath Ghosh, MA, BL, Provincial Civil Service, Deputy Magistrate, Bengal.
- James Guyer Harris, Provincial Civil Service, Superintendent, Office of the Commissioner, Mandalay Division, Burma.
- Rai Bahadur Tilok Chand, Provincial Civil Service, Extra Assistant Commissioner in the Punjab.
- Frank Luker, Superintendent, Government Press, Allahabad, United Provinces.
- Shankar Madho Chitnavis, BA, Statutory Civil Service, Deputy Commissioner, Chhindwara, Central Provinces and Berar.
- Arthur Henry Wilsone, Superintendent of the Office of the Inspector-General, Imperial Service Troops.
- Babu Kanti Bhushan Sen, Provincial Civil Service, Deputy Magistrate and Deputy Collector, Personal Assistant to the Commissioner of Chota Nagpur, Bihar and Orissa.
- Gilbert Franklyn Winn, Registrar in the Home Department of the Government of India.
- Rao Bahadur Anant Sadashiv Tambe, Deputy Assistant Political Agent, Junagadh State, Bombay Presidency.

=== Imperial Service Medal ===
- Parambalan Moidin Kutti, Pensioned Havildar, Divisional Office, Malapuram, Malabar District, Madras.
- Gangadin, late Jamadar peon in the office of the Superintending Engineer and Secretary to the Agent to the Governor General in Central India in the Public Works Department.
- Mahomed Ismail, late a Daftari in the Foreign and Political Department of the Government of India.

=== Appointments ===
- To Colonel-in-Chief
  - Her Majesty the Queen, of the 18th (Queen Mary's Own) Hussars.
  - Her Majesty Queen Alexandra, of the 19th (Queen Alexandra's Own Royal) Hussars and the Alexandra, Princess of Wales Own (Yorkshire Regiment).
  - Her Royal Highness the Princess Royal, of the 7th (Princess Royal's) Dragoon Guards.
  - Her Royal Highness Princess Louise, Duchess of Argyll, of the Princess Louise's (Argyll and Sutherland Highlanders).

=== Promotions ===
==== Royal Navy ====
- Commanders to the rank of Captain (dated 30 June 1914).
  - Hugh Gaultier Coghill Somerville.
  - Henry FitzRoy George Talbot.
  - Robert Cathcart Kemble Lambert.
  - Humphrey Wykeham Bowring.
  - George Michael Keane.
  - John Foster Grant-Dalton.
  - Alfred Astley Ellison.
  - Herbert Neville Garnett.
  - Herbert MacIver Edwards.
  - Charles Edward Whately Pyddoke.
  - Rudolf Miles Burmester.
  - David Thomas Norris.
  - Tufton Percy Hamilton Beamish.
  - George Parish Ross.
  - Henry Wise Parker.
  - Oliver Backhouse.
  - Oliver Schwann.
- Lieutenant-Commanders to the rank of Commander (dated 30 June 1914).
  - Arthur Douglas Barrow.
  - Malcolm Henry Somerled MacDonald.
  - Philip Henry Trimmer.
  - Reginald Henniker-Heaton.
  - Robert Stewart Roy.
  - Harold Edmund Denison.
  - James Geoffry Penrose Ingham.
  - Charles Stuart Forbes.
  - Thomas Bodley Scott.
  - Bernard William Murray Fairbairn.
  - Henry Gerard Laurence Oliphant.
  - Charles Arthur Scott.
  - Francis George Gillilan Chilton.
  - Francis Mary Hodgson.
  - Harold Brisbane Bedwell.
  - Roger L'Estrange Murray Rede.
  - Gerald Charles Dickens.
  - Hugh Dennis Marryat.
  - Arthur Horace Walker.
  - Kenneth Brounger.
  - Henry Francis Howard Wakefield.
  - Roland Cecil Sneyd Hunt.
  - Loftus William Jones.
  - John Peter Ralph Marriott.
  - Henry George Thursfield.
  - Colin Alfred Molyneux Sarel.
  - Gilbert George Pearse Hewett.
  - Dashwood Fowler Moir.
  - Arthur Edward Frederick Bedford.
  - Francis Loftus Tottenham.
  - Frederic Gerald Stuart Peile.
  - James Gordon Fraser.
  - Sidney Robert Bailey.
  - Hartley Russell Gwennap Moore.
  - Basil Edward Reinold.
  - Frederick Avenel Sommerville.
  - Alfred Headley Norman.
  - Geoffrey Blake.

==== Royal Naval Reserve ====
- Commanders to be Captain
  - Herbert James Haddock, CB, RD.
  - Owen Jones, RD.
  - James Thomas Walter Charles, CB, RD.
  - Charles Alfred Bartlett, RD.
- Honorary Commanders to be Honorary Captain
  - Walter Ernest Hutchinson.
  - Robert Cumming McFee.
  - Edward Collins.
  - Charles MacIver.
  - Henry MacIver.
  - The Right Honourable Earl Brassey, GCB.
  - John MacNab.
  - John Bell White.
  - Sir Charles Edward Heley Chadwyck-Healey, KCB, KC.
  - The Most Honourable the Marquis of Ormonde, KP.
  - Sir Richard Henry Williams-Bulkeley, Bt.
- Appointed Honorary Captain
  - Alfred Hamilton Frushard Young.
  - Sir Owen Philipps, KCMG.
  - Harold Sanderson.
- Lieutenants promoted to the rank of Commander
  - Arthur Edward Dunn.
  - Henry Lavington Walton.
- Appointed Honorary Commander
  - Charles Smith Creighton.
  - Percy Hamilton Rolfe.
  - Thomas Francis Gambell.
  - George Montagu Hicks.
  - John Campbell Drummond.
  - Edward Lionel Fletcher.
  - Charles Wood Gordon.
- Appointed Honorary Chief Engineer
  - James Edgar Wimshurst.
  - Roderick Morrison.

==== Promotions on the Retired List ====
- Commanders to be Captain
  - James Logan Parfitt
  - David Wilson Barker
  - Harvey William Broadbent, RD.
- Lieutenants to be Commander
  - Harris Lewis Wilson.
  - Alexander Hugh Hope Gibson Douglas, RD.
  - George Leigh King.
  - Francis Melville Tuke.
  - William Burvil Holmes.
  - Richard John Noal.

==== Army ====
- To Major, for services in connection with the Military Wing, Royal Flying Corps (dated 22 June 1914).
  - Captain (temporary Major) George Hebden Raleigh, The Essex Regiment.
  - Captain (temporary Major) John Harold Whitworth Becke, The Sherwood Foresters (Nottinghamshire and Derbyshire Regiment).
  - Captain (temporary Major) John Maitland Salmond, The King's Own (Royal Lancaster Regiment).
  - Captain (temporary Major) Charles Alexander Holcombe Longcroft, The Welsh Regiment.
- Honorary Chaplain to His Majesty
  - Reverend John M. Simms, DD, Chaplain to the Forces (1st Class)
