= Jack Marriott =

Jack Marriott may refer to:

- Jack Marriott (Royal Navy officer) (1879–1938), British naval officer
- Jack Marriott (footballer) (born 1994), English footballer

== See also ==
- John Marriott (disambiguation)
