= Visvesvaraya National Institute of Technology Nagpur =

Public engineering and research institute in India

Visvesvaraya National Institute of Technology, Nagpur
- Former name: Visvesvaraya Regional College of Engineering
- Motto in English: Excellence in action is Yoga
- Type: Public technical university
- Established: 1960; 66 years ago
- Chairperson: Madabhushi Madan Gopal, IAS (Retd.)
- Director: Dr. Prem Lal Patel
- Location: Nagpur, Maharashtra, India; 21°07′24″N 79°03′05″E
- Campus: Urban 215 acres (87 ha)
- Mascot: Flambeau
- Website: vnit.ac.in

Visvesvaraya National Institute of Technology Nagpur (VNIT), formerly known as Visvesvaraya Regional College of Engineering (VRCE) is a public technical university located in the city of Nagpur, Maharashtra. Established in 1960, the institute is among 31 National Institutes of Technology (NITs) in the country. In 2007, the institute was conferred with the status of Institute of National Importance by the National Institutes of Technology, Science Education and Research Act, 2007 of the Parliament of India with all other NITs.

Formerly known as Visvesvaraya Regional College of Engineering (VRCE), the institute is named in honour of an eminent engineer, planner and statesman Sir M. Visvesvaraya. The Institute awards Bachelor's, Master's and Doctorate degrees in engineering, technology, architecture, science and humanities.

== History ==
The institute's history can be traced back to 1947 when the Architecture Department was established by the Madhya Pradesh Government. Following the second five-year plan (1956–60) in India, several industrial projects were contemplated. The Regional Engineering Colleges (RECs) were established by the central government to mimic the IITs at a regional level and act as benchmarks for the other colleges in that state.

For the Western region in the year 1960, the institute was established under the name Visvesvaraya Regional College of Engineering (VRCE). It was established under the scheme sponsored by Govt. of India and Govt. of Maharashtra. The college was started in June 1960 by amalgamating the State Govt. Engineering College functioning in Nagpur since July 1956. In the meeting held in October 1962, the governing board of the college resolved to name it after the eminent engineer, planner, and statesman of the country M. Visvesvaraya.

The college started functioning in 1960 from a camp office in the premises of Government Polytechnic, Nagpur and subsequently, an area of about 214 acres was acquired to house an independent Regional Engineering College at its present location. It has its jurisdiction over entire state of Maharashtra.

== Campus ==
The VNIT Nagpur campus is located in the western part of Nagpur city near Ambazari Lake, about 7 kilometres (4.3 mi) from Nagpur Railway Station and 8 kilometres (5.0 mi) from Dr. Babasaheb Ambedkar International Airport. There are three main entrances to the 225 acres (91 ha) campus: the Main Gate on South Ambazari Road, the Bajaj Nagar Gate and the Yashwant Nagar Gate. The campus has significant green space, and is mostly untouched by the pollution of the rest of the city.

The institute has a gymkhana, as well as grounds for tennis, badminton, basketball, volleyball, football, hockey, and cricket. An NCC unit is also located on campus. There is also an auditorium and a medical centre.

== Infrastructure ==
- Academic Block: Ground + 6 floors for faculty and PhD scholars.
- Twenty Five Virtual Classrooms
- Girls Hostel: 1000 capacity with dedicated messes, community rooms and Multi Activity Complex.
- Boys Hostel: 7 hostels for its students. 1st year students share hostel rooms (two seater). 2nd year, 3rd year and 4th year students are given single room facility.
- Class Room Complex
- Health Center
- Library
- Auditorium
- Sports Facilities
  - Cricket Ground with six turf wickets. Cricket Pavilion with seating capacity - 500
  - Football Ground, Basketball Court and two Volleyball Courts with flood light arrangement.
  - Three Lawn Tennis Courts.
  - Kho-Kho, Kabaddi Grounds.
  - Well equipped gymnasium.
  - Indoor Badminton Stadium with four wooden sprung surfaced badminton courts.
  - Table Tennis Halls.
  - International Standard Swimming Pool

== Organisation and administration ==
=== Departments, laboratories and research centers ===
VNIT Nagpur has many academic departments, with over 30 specialised laboratories and research centres.

==== Departments and laboratories ====
- Applied Mechanics
- Applied and Environmental Microbiology
- Architecture and Planning
- Biomechatronics
- Biomedical Engineering
- Chemistry
- Chemical Engineering
- Civil Engineering
- Computer Science and Engineering
- Computational Physics
- Electrical and Electronics Engineering
- Electronics and Communication Engineering
- Geoscience and Technology
- Geobiology
- Humanities and Social Sciences
- Hydrologic Engineering
- Industrial and Manufacturing Engineering
- Mathematics
- Mechanical Engineering
- Metallurgical and Materials Engineering
- Mining Engineering
- Physics
- Urban Design & Planning

==== Centers ====
- Center of Excellence for Commbedded Systems
- Computer Aided Design (CAD)
- Computer Aided Manufacturing (CAM)
- Material Engineering Center
- Center for Remote Sensing
- Center for Water Resources
- Center for VLSI and Nanotechnology
- Incubation Center (CIVN: Center for Innovation)
- Center for Distance Engineering Education Program (C-DEEP)
- V.R. Jamdar Siemens Center of Excellence

== Academics ==
=== Academic programs ===
Undergraduate programs are offered in Architecture (B.Arch) and eight engineering (B.Tech.) disciplines:

- Electronics Engineering (VLSI Design and Technology)
- Chemical Engineering
- Civil Engineering
- Computer Science and Engineering
- Electrical and Electronics Engineering
- Electronics and Communications Engineering
- Mechanical Engineering
- Metallurgical and Materials Engineering
- Mining Engineering

The Engineering undergraduate programs are usually four years, while Architecture is a five-year program. The institute accepts an incoming freshman class of up to 1143 students.

Graduate and research programs leading to Master's (M.Arch, M.Sc. and M.Tech.) and Ph.D. degrees, are offered by the Architecture department, as well as all basic science departments and all eight engineering departments. A range of special fields of study are available in graduate and research programs in each discipline. The institute has launched an MTech in EV Technology And M.tech in Applied Ai and will soon offer Aeronautical Engineering. Up to 350 students are admitted to the Master's program each year.

The institute uses relative grading on a 10-point scale.

=== Admissions ===
Till 2012–13, admission to the undergraduate courses (B.Tech.) at NITs was through the All India Engineering Entrance Examination (AIEEE). From 2013 to 2014, admission to the undergraduate courses (B.Tech.) is through the Joint Entrance Examination (JEE) Main. The National Institutes of Technology (NITs) have one of the lowest acceptance rates for engineering institutes, around 2 to 3 percent, second only to the Indian Institutes of Technology (IITs) in India.

From 2015, the Joint Seat Allocation Authority (JoSSA)] conducts common counselling and allocates seats jointly for all Indian Institutes of Technology (IITs), National Institutes of Technology (NITs) and Indian Institutes of Information Technology (IIITs). In 2015, over 1,300,000 candidates appeared for the JEE exam for admission to 28,000 undergraduate engineering seats (B.Tech.) in 68 centrally-funded technical institutes that included all 19 IITs (10,000 seats), 31 NITs (15,500 seats) and 18 IIITs (2,500 seats).

Undergraduate admissions for foreign students and NRIs are done through Direct Admission of Students Abroad (DASA) scheme which considers SAT scores.

Eighty percent of students to the postgraduate programs (M.Tech.) are admitted based on performance in the Graduate Aptitude Test in Engineering (GATE) conducted by the Indian Institutes of Technology (IITs) and the Indian Institute of Science (IISc). These students receive stipends and tuition assistance from the institute and the Indian government. Another 20% of students are admitted based on industry or other research organization sponsorship, with full tuition typically paid by the sponsoring institution.

The institute invites applications for PhD degree admissions in all departments for two times during summer and winter session .

=== Rankings ===
University and college rankings

General – international
- Times (World) (2024): 1201-1500
- Times (Asia) (2024): 401-350

Engineering – India
- NIRF (2024): 39
- India Today (2024): 21
- Outlook India (2024): 25+

Architecture – India
- NIRF (2024): 10

VNIT Nagpur has been ranked 44th among engineering colleges and 89th rank Overall in India by the National Institutional Ranking Framework (NIRF) in 2025.

== Student life ==
=== Cultural and non-academic activities ===
- The annual Science & Technology festival of VNIT Nagpur, AXIS is every year and is one of the largest Science and Technology festival.
- The Entrepreneurship Cell of VNIT Nagpur (also known as E-Cell, VNIT), organizes several activities throughout the year in order to promote entrepreneurship. Consortium is an entrepreneurship conclave organized in the campus of VNIT Nagpur by E-Cell to bring together all the stakeholders of the entrepreneurship ecosystem.
- Aarohi is the annual cultural festival of VNIT Nagpur. Lasting three days, it is the largest youth event organized in the Octobers of Central India. It was started in 1989 by the pioneer batch of VNIT.

These college festivals are organised, financially managed and conducted entirely by the students of this institute. All these festivals and organisations are sponsored by private enterprise. Apart from these festivals, various other engineering streams based festivals are also being organised to motivate students towards Science and Technology. These include Symposium (Metallurgical and Material Science Engineering), Chemix (Chemical Engineering) etc.

VNIT Nagpur's Diamond Jubilee was held in 2020, with Union Minister for Road Transport and Highways, Nitin Gadkari attending as the chief guest at the inaugural function of the Diamond Jubilee celebrations.

== Notable alumni ==
- Neelam Saxena Chandra - poet and author
- Satyendra Pakhale - industrial designer, architect
- Sudev Nair - actor
- Vijay P. Bhatkar - scientist, Padma Bhushan and Padma Shri awardee, founding director of Centre for Development of Advanced Computing
- Budaraju Srinivasa Murty - director, Indian Institute of Technology Hyderabad
- Ramesh Jain - professor of Information & Computer Sciences, University of California, Irvine
- Nemkumar Banthia - professor of civil engineering at the University of British Columbia and CEO of IC-IMPACTS
- Akhilesh K. Gaharwar - professor of Biomedical Engineering, Texas A&M University.
- Pradeep Kar - chairman and founder, Microland
- Dinesh Keskar - senior vice president of sales in Asia-Pacific and India at Boeing Commercial Airplanes
- Hemant Karkare - late chief of Mumbai Anti-Terrorist Squad
- Sanjay Joshi - former member of the Bhartiya Janata Party national executive; Rashtriya Swayamsevak Sangh Pracharak.
- Anand Teltumbde - scholar, writer, and civil rights activist who is a management professor at the Goa Institute of Management
- Rashmi Urdhwareshe - An Indian automotive engineer, she is the director of the Automotive Research Association of India. In March 2020 she received the Nari Shakti Puraskar.
