= John Trump (engineer) =

British engineer in Malaya (1858–1941)

Director of the Public Works Department of the Federated Malay States
- In office 1908-1914
- Preceded by: Francis St. George Caulfeild
- Succeeded by: R.O.N. Anderson

Personal details
- Born: 1858
- Died: 1941 (aged 83)
- Occupation: Engineer

John Trump ISO (1858 – 1941) was a British engineer in British Malaya from 1878 to 1914, and served as head of the Public Works Department of the Federated Malay States.

== Career ==
John Trump began his career in 1878, aged 20, when he joined the Ceylon Public Works Department where he remained for five years.

In 1883, Trump went to Perak as officer commanding the 2nd Division of the Ceylon Pioneers. In 1886, he was appointed District Engineer of Kinta, was later promoted to Deputy State Engineer, and in 1901 was appointed to the substantive position of State Engineer.

In 1904, Trump was appointed as Acting Director of Public Works for the Federated Malay States, and in 1908 was promoted to head the department as Director. One of his achievements was working on the completion of the 21-mile long Krian Irrigation Canal in Perak which cost $1.6 million. In his final report as Director in 1914, he confirmed that $10.4 million had been spent on public works in the Federated Malay States in the preceding year, the highest expenditure being on expansion of the road network.

In 1914, he retired to England and died in London in 1941.

== Honours ==
In 1914, he was awarded the Imperial Service Order.
