= Thomas Ronayne =

New Zealand railway manager

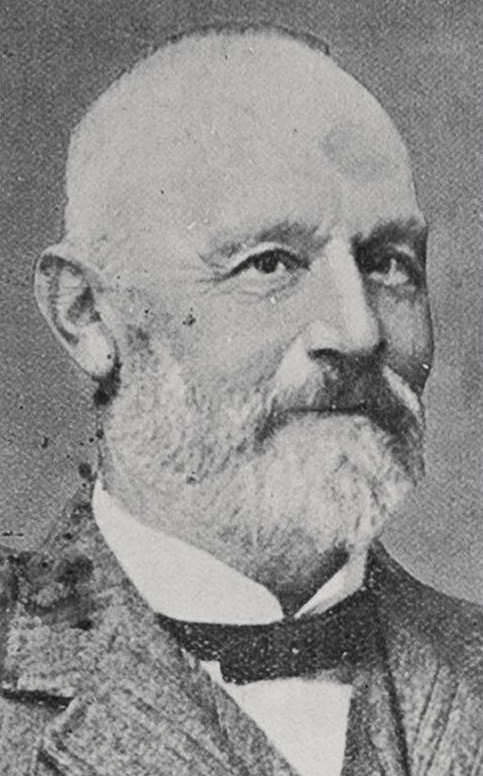
Thomas Ronayne

Thomas Ronayne ISO (1849 – 7 September 1925) was a New Zealand public servant involved in railway management. He was the general manager of New Zealand Railways from 1895 to 1913. He was a member of the New Zealand Railways Board, and was accidentally killed while inspecting the Clydevale mine near Westport on the West Coast.

== Biography ==
Ronayne was born in Youghal, County Cork, Ireland, in 1849, and was apprenticed in Manchester and Dublin. He arrived in New Zealand in 1875, and was put in charge of railway works at Helensville in 1875, Greymouth in 1876, and Addington in 1878. In 1890, he organised the Greymouth–Brunner Line.

Ronayne was appointed the general manager of New Zealand Railways from the start of 1895, and in 1906 he represented New Zealand at the International Railway Congress. He was succeeded as general manager by Ernest Hiley in September 1913, and was appointed a Companion of the Imperial Service Order in the 1914 King's Birthday Honours.

Following World War I, Ronayne served as a director of a number of small coal-mining companies on the West Coast. In that capacity, he visited the Clydevale mine at Seddonville with other directors on 7 September 1925. They travelled in one of the tubs of the aerial tramway, and heavy rain started; Ronayne covered his head with a sack, despite warnings from the mine manager. The sack dislodged the tub pin, causing the tub to tip, and Ronayne fell to the ground 25 feet below, dying from a fractured skull. An inquest at Seddonville returned a verdict of accidental death.
