= Yi Lu Murphey =

Electrical engineer and professor

Yi Lu Murphey (also published as Yi Lu) is an electrical engineer, the Paul K. Trojan Collegiate Professor of Engineering, professor in the Department of Electrical and Computer Engineering, and Associate Dean for Graduate Education and Research at the University of Michigan. Her research involves engineering applications of machine learning and computer vision.

Murphey earned a master's degree in electrical engineering from Wayne State University in 1983. She completed her Ph.D. in 1989 at the University of Michigan, where she was a student of Ramesh Jain.

She was named a Fellow of the Institute of Electrical and Electronics Engineers (IEEE) in 2014 "for her contributions to optimal energy control in hybrid electric vehicles".
