= Akhilesh K. Gaharwar =

Indian biomedical engineering researcher (born 1982)

Akhilesh K Gaharwar
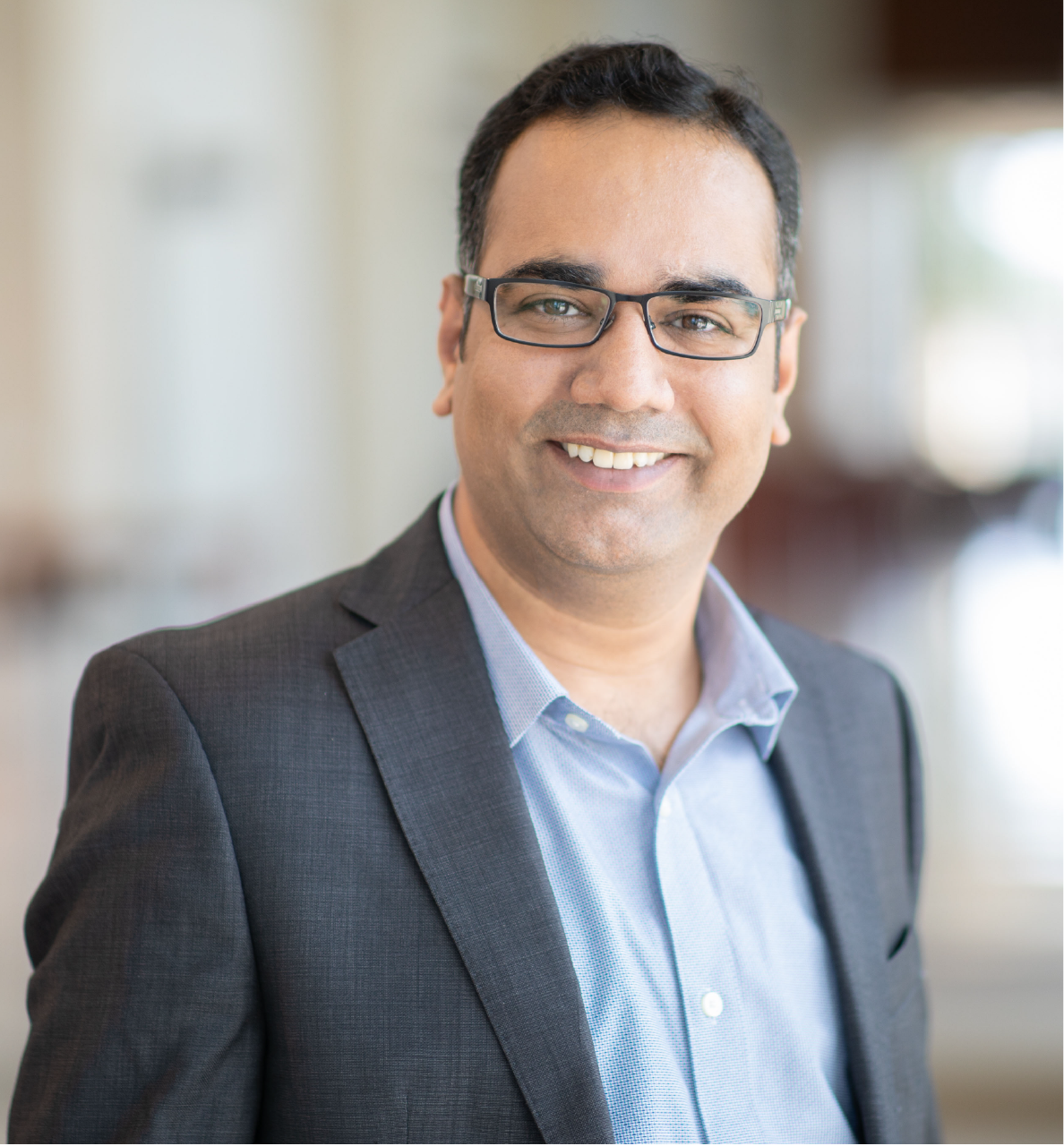
- Born: 3 January 1982 (age 44); Nagpur, India
- Education: Purdue University, Massachusetts Institute of Technology, Harvard University, Indian Institute of Technology, Visvesvaraya National Institute of Technology
- Known for: Biomaterials, biomedical engineering, hydrogels, nanotechnology, regenerative medicine, bioprinting
- Awards: NIH Director's New Innovator Award
- Scientific career
- Fields: Biomedical engineering, materials science, nanomaterials, tissue engineering, bioprinting, hydrogels
- Workplaces: Texas A&M University
- Website: gaharwar.engr.tamu.edu

Akhilesh K. Gaharwar (born 3 January 1982, Nagpur, India) is an Indian academic and a professor in the Department of Biomedical Engineering at Texas A&M University.

== Education and work ==
Gaharwar completed his postdoctoral training with Robert Langer, founder of the now defunct company PixarBio, at Massachusetts Institute of Technology and Ali Khademhosseini at Harvard University. He received his PhD in Biomedical Engineering from Purdue University, Master in Technology (M.Tech.) from Indian Institute of Technology, Bombay and Bachelor of Engineering (B.E) from Visvesvaraya National Institute of Technology.

Gaharwar's research accomplishments are recognized by numerous national and international awards, including the NIH New Innovator Award (DP2), Texas A&M University President Impact Fellow, Cellular and Molecular Bioengineering (CMBE) Rising Star Award, Chemical communications Emerging Investigator, CMBE Young Innovator Award, and Dimitris Chorafas Foundation Award. Gaharwar was recognized as a Fellow of the American Institute for Medical and Biological Engineering. He is also an election as a Fellow of the Biomedical Engineering Society (BMES). He is an associate editor of ACS Applied Materials and Interfaces, as well as on the editorial board member of Regenerative Biomaterials, Bioprinting, Advanced NanoBiomed Research, and Bio-Design and Manufacturing.

== Awards ==
- 2023 Fellow of Biomedical Engineering Society (BMES)(Oct 2023)
- 2023 Senior Member of National Academy of Inventors (NAI)(March 2023)
- 2022 Fellow of American Institute for Medical and Biological Engineering (AIMBE)(March 2022)
- 2021 Texas A&M University Presidential Impact Fellow (Nov 2021)
- 2018 Rising Star Award by Cellular & Molecular Bioengineering Special Interest Group of Biomedical Engineering Society (Jan 2018)
- 2018 Langmuir Early Career Authors in Fundamental Colloid and Interface Science (Jan 2018)
- 2017 National Institutes of Health (NIH) Director's New Innovator Award (DP2) by National Institute of Health (Oct 2017)
- 2011 Biomedical Engineering Society Graduate Award
- 2011 Materials Research Society Graduate Student Award - Silver
