= John Marriott =

John Marriott may refer to:

- John Marriott (poet) (1780–1825), English poet and clergyman
- Sir John Marriott (British politician) (1859–1945), British historian and member of Parliament
- Jack Marriott (Royal Navy officer) (1879–1938), British Royal Navy officer
- John Marriott (actor) (1893–1977), American actor
- Sir John Charles Oakes Marriott (1895–1978), British Army officer during World War I and World War II
- John Marriott (Australian politician) (1913–1994), Australian Senator
- Sir John Marriott (philatelist) (1922–2001), British philatelist, Keeper of the Royal Philatelic Collection
- Jackie Marriott (1928–2016), footballer
- John Marriott (footballer), Australian rules footballer in the SANFL
