= Robert Scott-Kerr =

British Army officer

Brigadier-General Robert Scott-Kerr CB CMG DSO MVO
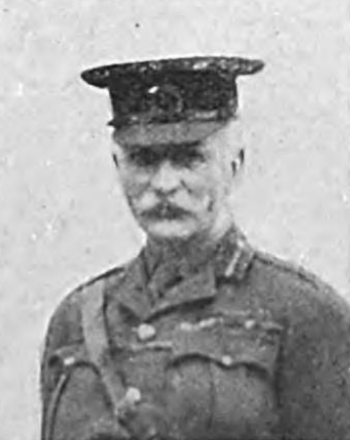
- Born: 2 November 1859
- Died: 25 November 1942 (aged 83)
- Alma mater: Eton; Trinity College, Cambridge
- Military career
- Allegiance: United Kingdom
- Branch: British Army
- Conflicts: Anglo-Zulu War; Mahdist War; Second Boer War; World War I

Brigadier-General Robert Scott-Kerr CB CMG DSO MVO (2 November 1859 – 25 November 1942) was a British Army officer.

== Military career ==
After being educated at Eton and Trinity College, Cambridge, he was commissioned in the 24th Regiment of Foot, later the South Wales Borderers, in 1879, transferring shortly thereafter to the Grenadier Guards. He saw service in the Zulu War in 1879, where he fought at the Battle of Ulundi. Promotion to lieutenant followed on 1 July 1881, and in 1885 he fought in the Mahdist War.

He was promoted to captain on 16 December 1890, and to major on 19 September 1896.

Following the outbreak of the Second Boer War in 1899, Scott-Kerr served with his regiment in South Africa. He took part in the operations in the Orange Free State April to May 1900, and in the Orange River Colony May to November 1900, including the actions at Biddulphsberg (May 1900) and Wittebergen (July 1900), where he was mentioned in despatches and for which he was awarded the Distinguished Service Order (DSO).

After peace was declared in May 1902, he left South Africa on board the SS Bavarian and arrived in the United Kingdom the following month.

On his return from South Africa, he was in July 1902 appointed second in command of the 2nd Battalion, Grenadier Guards, and on 14 February 1904 he was promoted to lieutenant colonel and succeeded Francis Lloyd as commanding officer (CO) of the 1st Battalion, Grenadier Guards. He was promoted to brevet colonel in February 1907 while in command of the battalion. He was made a Member of the Royal Victorian Order (MVO) in 1908 and was promoted to colonel on 7 November 1908.

On 30 July 1910, after serving on half-pay, he was placed in command of the Scots Guards regiment and regimental district. He was made a Companion of the Order of the Bath (CB) in the 1914 Birthday Honours.

On the outbreak of the First World War he was promoted to brigadier general and took command of 4th (Guards) Brigade in the British Expeditionary Force. He was wounded on 1 September, commanding 4th Brigade in a rearguard action during the Retreat from Mons, and returned to England. The injuries proved so severe that he never again held a field command; he commanded a brigade in the Home Forces for the remainder of the war, before retiring in 1919.

He was appointed a Companion of the Order of St Michael and St George in the 1919 New Year Honours.
