= Shankar Madhav Chitnavis =

Indian government official

Shankar Madhav Chitnavis ISO (born 1867 - ) was a statutory officer and worked a deputy commissioner of Central Province. He was brother of Gangadhar Rao Chitnavis.

He was member of First and Second Legislative Council of Central Provinces and Berar during 1921 – 23 and 1923–1926.

He was elected President of Third and Fourth Legislative Council of Central Provinces and Berar during 1927 – 30 and 1930–1937.

He was awarded the Kaisar-i-Hind Gold Medal 9 November 1901. and appointed ISO in the 1914 Birthday Honours.
