= Government Polytechnic, Nagpur =

Autonomous educational institution

Coordinates: 21°9′48.46″N 79°4′59.5″E

- GP Nagpur logo
- Former names: Government Engineering School
- Type: Public Government Institute
- Established: 19 July 1914 (111 years ago)
- Affiliations: Autonomous, AICTE, DTE
- Chairman: G. R. Thakare (Joint Director, Technical Education, Regional Office, Nagpur)
- Students: 2670 Approx.
- Location: Near Mangalwari Bazaar, Sadar, Nagpur, Pin-440001, Maharashtra, India
- Campus: Urban 22 acres (8.9 ha)
- Acronym: GP Nagpur
- Website: gpnagpur.ac.in

The Government Polytechnic, Nagpur is an autonomous educational institution of the government of Maharashtra, a state in Western India.

== History ==
It was founded on 14 July 1914 as the Government Engineering School. At its commencement the school had 16 students on roll and was located in the Victoria Science College (now the Institute of Science) in Nagpur. During its first year the school provided courses in Civil Engineering & Mechanical Engineering up to diploma standard. Later in 1915 Automobile Engineering Course was also established which vias subsequently converted into Post Diploma in Automobile Engineering. The institution has given birth to Engineering College presently known as Visvesvaraya National Institute of Technology, Nagpur(VNIT). The school was expanding rapidly & from 16 students enrolled in 1914 increased to nearly 2000 in current year and Govt. Engineering School converted to Government Polytechnic, Nagpur.

== Campus ==
The total intake capacity of all these programmes is 890 students. The premises of this institute is spread over 22 acres of land. Accommodation for 180 boys, 54 girls and 20 trainees is also available in the campus.

== Academics ==
Government Polytechnic Nagpur has various academic departments, with specialized laboratories and research centers.

=== Departments ===
- Applied Chemistry
- Applied Mathematics
- Applied Physics
- Applied Mechanics
- Humanities & Social Science
- Civil Engineering
- Mechanical Engineering
- Mechatronics Engineering
- Electrical Engineering
- Electronics and Telecommunication Engineering
- Computer Technology
- Information Technology
- Packaging Technology
- Metallurgical Engineering
- Textile Manufacturer
- Mine & Mine Surveying
- Automobile Engineering
- Travel & Tourism
- Artificial Intelligence and Machine Learning

== Courses ==
The institute is selected by Govt. of Maharashtra as a training provider in Information Technology to various institutions. Presently the institute is providing training to staff & students of Institute of Science, Nagpur & I.T.I in the region, Govt. Hotel Management & Catering Technology, Nagpur in addition to the institute.

Government of Maharashtra awarded academic autonomy to this institute in the year 1995.

The institute is conducting certificate courses of 3 months, 6 months, one-year duration in Information Technology & other advanced technology areas for 10th, 12th, graduate students. The World Bank Assisted Project was implemented at this institute from 1992 to 1995 for improvement of quality of technician education. Canada-India Institute Industry Linkage Project was implemented in the institute from 2000-2004.

== Awards ==
The institute was awarded World Bank assisted Technical Education Quality Improvement Program (TEQIP) through competitive bidding and received ₨2.55 crores. This fund was utilised for academic excellence, Networking of institutes and services to community and economic development. This institute received ISTE Narsee Monjee award for overall Best Performance in the year 1996 and Best Polytechnic award of Government of Maharashtra in the year 1997.

== Courses Offered ==
Sr No.	Name of Programme	Sanctioned Intake		Accreditation
		First Shift	Second Shift	
1	Diploma in Automobile Engineering	60	-	AICTE
2	Diploma in Civil Engineering	90	60	AICTE
3	Diploma in Computer Engineering	60	-	AICTE
4	Diploma in Electrical Engineering	60	-	AICTE
5	Diploma in Electronics & Telecommunication Engineering	60	60	AICTE
6	Diploma in Electronics & Telecommunication Engineering (Only for Female)	30	-	AICTE
7	Diploma in Information Technology	60	-	AICTE
8	Diploma in Mechanical Engineering	60	60	AICTE
9	Diploma in Metallurgical Engineering	40	-	AICTE
10	Diploma in Mining & Mine Surveying	40	-	AICTE
11	Diploma in Packaging Technology	60	-	AICTE
12	Diploma in Textile Manufacture	60	-	AICTE
13	Diploma in Travel & Tourism	30	-	AICTE
14	Diploma in Artificial Intelligiance and Machine Learning	30	-	AICTE
Total Intake - 920

All the above courses are of 3 years duration.
