= Francis St. George Caulfeild =

Irish civil engineer (1852–1933)

Francis St. George Caulfeild ISO MICE
- Born: 20 February 1852
- Died: 17 October 1933 (aged 81); Sproughton, Suffolk
- Education: Trinity College Dublin
- Occupation: Civil engineer
- Children: 1

Francis St. George Caulfeild (20 February 1852 – 17 October 1933) was an Irish civil engineer. He was Director of Public Works of the Federated Malay States from 1901 to 1907.

== Early life and education ==
Caulfeild was born on 20 February 1852, the son of Rt Rev Charles Caulfeild, Bishop of Nassau. He was descended from the Charlemont family title dating back to 1620. On his mother's side, he was connected with the family of St George, his mother being a daughter of Sir Richard Bligh St George, second Baronet. He was educated at Ruthin School, and Trinity College Dublin.

== Career ==
Caulfeild began his career with Brecon and Merthyr Railway and rose to assistant engineer in 1874. In the following year he was Resident Engineer on the railway works at Connah's Quay. From 1876 to 1878, he was assistant Engineer of Reading Drainage, Irrigation and Waterworks. He then became managing engineer in the firm of J. Russell in Westminster.

In August 1879, he went to Malaya as Superintendent of the Public Works Department, Surveyor and Registrar of Mines of Perak, and in 1883 was appointed State Engineer, before the creation of the Federation, serving in the post until 1901.

Caulfeild was known "in every sense a pioneer of the Public Works Department" being credited with the construction of the first water-works in Malay Peninsula at Taiping in 1883 and the first railway in 1886 from Port Weld to Taiping. He was responsible for the construction of a network of new cart roads which later formed the basis of Malaya's modern road system and many new buildings. In 1883, he explored the upper Perak River and parts of the Siamese Malay States. In 1899, he prepared the plans for the large Krian irrigation scheme which cost $1.6 million which improved rice and rubber production. From 1900 to 1901 he was in Singapore as acting Colonial Engineer, and was a member of the Legislative Council of Singapore.

In 1901, after the creation of the Federation, all the Public Works Departments of the four individual Malay states were amalgamated into a single body headed by Caulfeild as Director of Public Works of the Federated Malay States. In 1903, he completed surveys for the expansion of Kuantan Harbour. He retired in 1907.

== Personal life and death ==
Caulfeild married Helen Simonds on 11 November 1880 and they had a son. Caulfield was a keen Freemason and founder of the Masters of Perak Jubilee Lodge.

Caulfeild died on 17 October 1933 in Sproughton, Suffolk, aged 81.

== Honours ==
Caulfeild was appointed Companion of the Imperial Service Order (ISO) in 1904. In 1903, he was invested with the insignia of a Companion of the Distinguished Service Order.
