= Henry Machin =

Henry Turner Machin ISO (26 November 1832 in Newcastle-under-Lyme, England - 25 April 1918 in Sherbrooke, Quebec) was a senior bureaucrat in the province of Quebec.

He was the son of Reverend Thomas Machin and received his education at the Upper Canada College. He married Lucy Anne Hale, daughter of Edward Hale.

Machin was presented with the Imperial Service Order for his service as Deputy Minister of the Treasury of the Province of Quebec. Additionally, he was appointed as the Quebec financial representative in an arbitration case between the Provinces of Quebec and Ontario. This case lasted for eleven years.

He is buried at Saint Peter Cemetery, Sherbrooke, Quebec.
