= Rashmi Urdhwareshe =

Indian automotive engineer

Rashmi Urdhwardeshe
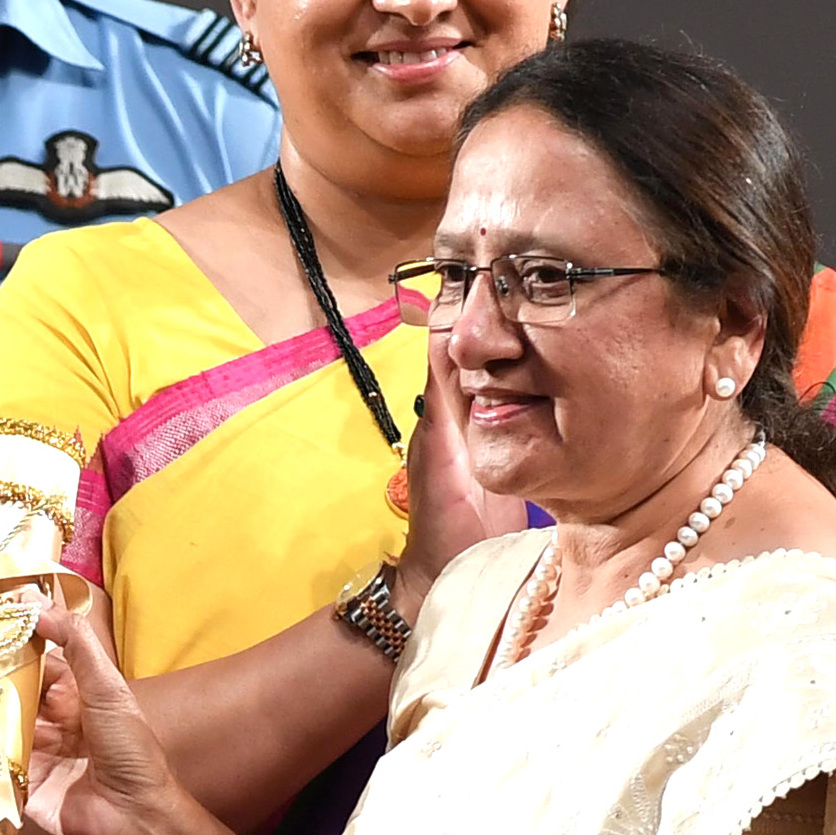
- in March 2020
- Born: Rashmi Ranade; 1959 (age 66–67); Nagpur
- Education: Visvesvaraya National Institute of Technology, Nagpur
- Occupation: Indian automotive engineer
- Employer: Automotive Research Association of India
- Known for: awarded the Nari Shakti Puraskar

Rashmi Urdhwardeshe born Rashmi Ranade (born c.1959) is an Indian automotive engineer. She is the director of the Automotive Research Association of India. In March 2020 she received the Nari Shakti Puraskar.

== Life ==
Urdhwareshe was born in Nagpur in 1959. In 1977 she opted to study at Visvesvaraya National Institute of Technology, Nagpur Electrical Engineering and then completed her post graduation from COEP in Automotive Engineering, which was then an unusual and challenging choice of career for a woman in India. There were few women (and not many toilets) at the engineering college and automotive was usually an all-male preserve.

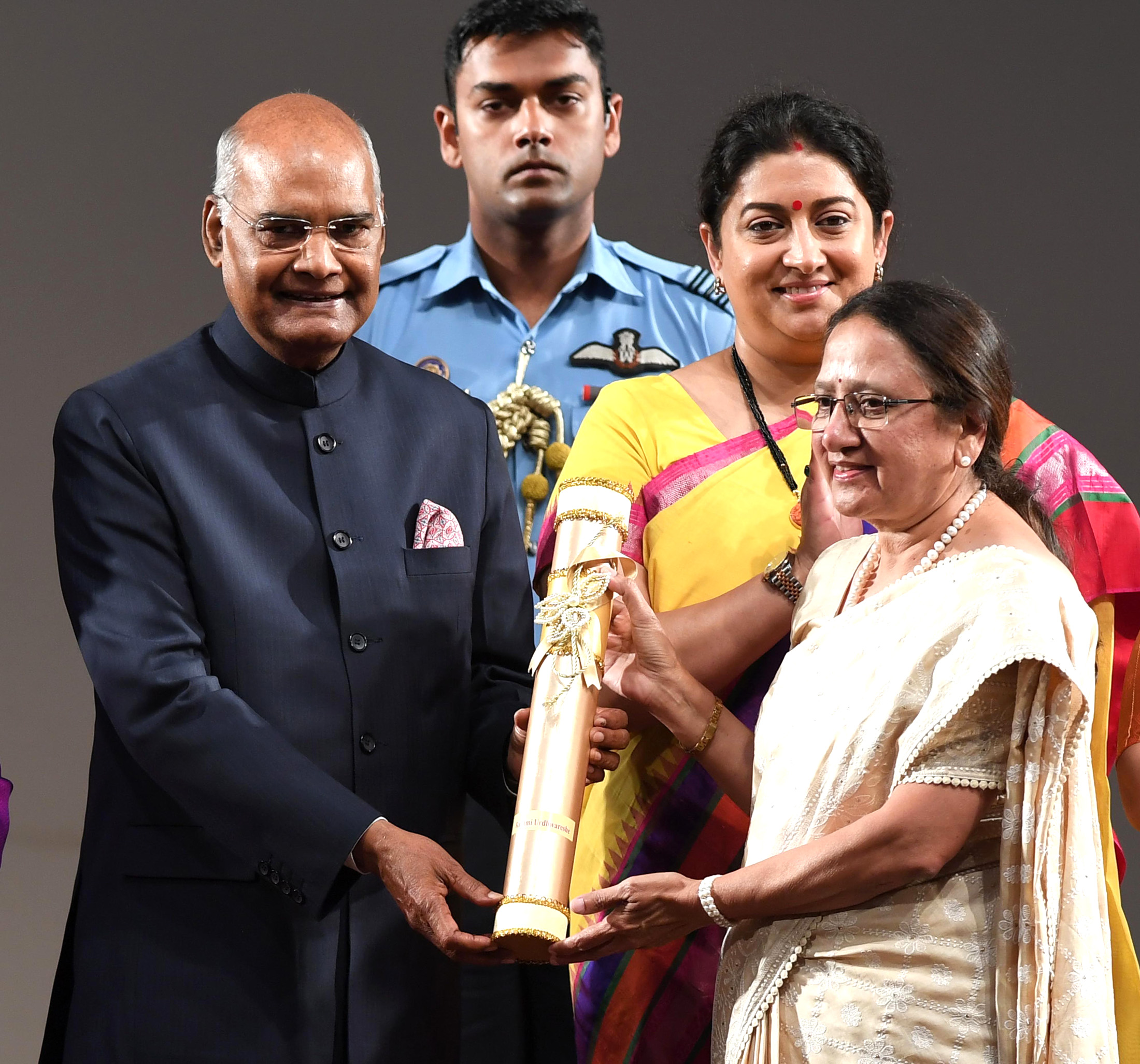
President Ram Nath Kovind presenting the Nari Shakti Puruskar to Rashmi Urdhwareshe watched by the Minister for Women Smriti Irani

She was trained in electronic engineering and helped to develop controls for the hydraulics of testing machines and then on emission control. She helped develop methods of measurement of emissions at what was the first Indian laboratory studying emissions. Her areas of expertise are automotive safety, emissions and ambient air quality (AQM), E-mobility, sustainable transport, vehicle regulation, homologation, etc. She is an expert on total quality management and co-authored a book on the subject.

She was keen on sport as a girl, learned to play the sitar and in time she was a champion at Bridge for her state.

She was chosen to be the next director of the Automotive Research Association of India in 2014.

In March 2020, her work in 2019 was recognised with the highest award for women in India. The Nari Shakti Puraskar was given by the President of India Ram Nath Kovind recognising her work over 35 years work in automotive research and development. At the time she was based in Pune so she travelled to get the award in Delhi at the Rashtrapati Bhavan Cultural Center. The award is made to women who have worked exceptionally for women's empowerment. After the ceremony Urdhwardeshe complimented the Prime Minister Narendra Modi for his work in this area noting the largely untapped potential of under educated women in India. Rashmi Urdhwareshe is the incoming President of SAE India.

== Private life ==
Her husband Hemant Urdhwareshe is also an engineer. He cared for their fourteen-month-old child, Sarang Urdhwareshe, while his wife was in Germany for six months.
