= Matru Sewa Sangh =

Indian non-profit

Matru Sewa Sangh is an Indian non-profit organisation founded in 1921, by Kamalatai Hospet and Venutai Nene in Nagpur, Maharashtra. It runs a network of sites dedicated to providing health services to the poor, including a maternity hospital, school for the intellectually disabled, home for the aged, child adoption services, working women's hostel and family counseling center. It also runs the Institute of Social Work, affiliated with Nagpur University, which provides adult education and development programmes. Matru Sewa Sangh was founded by Kamalatai Hospet (1896–1981) and Venutai Nene (1896–1973).

Matru Sewa Sangh has gradually expanded its activities beyond maternal health, establishing centres across central India that focus on community welfare, social rehabilitation and accessible healthcare. Over the decades, the organisation introduced specialised services such as neonatal care, disability support, geriatric care and women’s shelter facilities, reflecting its broader mandate of social development. Its programmes are designed to serve economically disadvantaged groups, with an emphasis on preventive healthcare, education, and training in social work.

== Recognition ==
The leaders of Indian society, such as Jawaharlal Nehru and Indira Gandhi, among others, recognised Matru Sewa Sangh's work over the course of its existence.

Awards to the organisation and its staff include:

- 1961 Padma Shri, Government of India: Kamalatai Hospet
- 1961 Nalava Best Nurse Award, Red Cross Society: Krishnatai Bhave
- 1980 Jamnalal Bajaj Award, Bajaj Foundation: Kamalatai Hospet
- 1994 Platinum Jubilee Endowment Trust Award, Indian Merchants' Chamber, Bombay: Matru Sewa Sangh, Nagpur
- 1996 Sir Arthur Eyre Brook International Award, World Orthopaedic Concern, Amsterdam: Dr Vikram Marwah

== Maternity hospitals ==
The organisation has 12 maternity hospitals in the states of Maharashtra and Madhya Pradesh. Founded in 1921, the original hospital at Nagpur now provides 75 beds and a range of out-patient clinics. It is a government-recognised facility for training house officers and for medical fee reimbursement. Services include family planning, antenatal and postnatal care, premature baby care, a well-baby clinic with a neonatal intensive care unit (NICU), cancer detection, orthopaedics, and homeopathy and ayurvedic clinics. The hospital has an outreach vehicle taking family planning services to outlying areas.

== Matru Sewa Sangh Institute of Social Work ==
The MSS Institute of Social Work was founded in 1921, is the first Institute of Social Work in Vidarbha and provides Social Work Education in Nagpur for both men and women. It also runs Field Action Projects and programmes in the slums and in rural areas. In conjunction with Nagpur University it grants bachelor's and master's degrees in social work, M.Phil (Social Work) and PhD programme in Social Work. It is a NAAC accredited A grade college with its own spacious campus in Bajaj Nagar, Nagpur. The Institute also collaborates with the Tata Institute of Social Sciences (Deemed University), Mumbai, for running Bachelor of Vocation courses in Child Care, Child Protection and Geriatric Care.

== Snehangan ==
This residential school for physically handicapped children is a project by Matru Sewa Sangh for Physically Handicapped Students. This institute aims at the Rehabilitation of the children by providing them medical attention & education simultaneously.

== Other organisations ==
In 1971, Kamalatai Hospet also co-founded Vidya Shikshan Prasarak Manda, which now has more than fifty educational institutes.^{1}
