= Bernard William Murray Fairbairn =

Vice-Admiral Bernard William Murray Fairbairn (18 April 1880 – 5 April 1960) was a Royal Navy officer.

During the Second World War, he returned to service first as a convoy commodore from 1939 to 1942, then as Flag Officer in Charge, Milford Haven, from 1942 to 1945.
