= Kamalabai Hospet =

Indian social worker

- Born: 23 May 1896; Shirpur, Dhule, Maharashtra, India
- Died: 15 November 1981 (aged 85)

Kamalabai Hospet (1896–1981), also known as Kamalatai Hospet, was a co-founder of Matru Sewa Sangh, a non-profit social organisation based in Nagpur, Maharashtra, India. Together with Venutai Nene (1896–1973), she founded Matru Sewa Sangh in 1921. In 1971, she also co-founded Vidya Shikshan Prasarak Mandal, which now has more than fifty educational institutes.

== Early life ==
Kamalabai Hospet was born on 23 May 1896 in Shirpur village in Dhule of Maharashatra State in India. Her maiden name was Yamuna Krushna Mohoni. She was the seventh child of Krushnaji Tatya Mohoni and Radhabai Mohoni. She was married at the age of 12 year to Mr. Gururao Hospet as was the custom in those days. Mr. Gururao died when Kamalabai was a mere 15 years old. The Hospet family was very conservative and as per custom in those days Kamalabai's head was to be tonsured. Kamalabai's brother Mr. D.K Mohoni realised this and returned her to her maternal home in Nagpur with the help of local police.

== Later life ==
For further education she was sent to Hingana, Pune at the institute founded by Maharshi Dhondo Keshav Karve. She did not complete her education here however, to avoid the financial burden of her education on her brothers' families. With the thought of becoming financially independent, she joined a nursing course at the Dufferin Hospital in Nagpur. She was a student here from 1918 to 1920.

While undergoing training at the Dufferin Hospital she was reprimanded by a British doctor for offering a bed pan to a poor Indian patient. This incident made a deep impact on her and she decided to start a maternity home which would serve all Indian women without discrimination. As a result, she founded such a maternity home called Matru Sewa Sangh at Sitabuldi, Nagpur as soon as she completed her training. This maternity home started with four beds in one location and during her lifetime had expanded to 21 branches across multiple states such as Maharashtra, Madhya Pradesh and Rajasthan. She paid personal care and attention to her patients as well as their families. Apart from running the maternity home, she started a Nurses Training School, and Institute of Social Work, a school for mentally disabled students: Nandanwan, a senior citizen home: Panchavati, a foundling home and an orphanage all under the aegis of Matru Sewa Sangh.

Kamalabai also rendered great service in the India Freedom struggle. She worked as a volunteer in the All India Congress Session at Nagpur in 1920.

== Death ==
Kamalbai Hospet died on 15 November 1981 leaving behind a retinue of dedicated workers which included members of her family as well.

== Recognition ==
Kamalabai was conferred in 1959 with Nalawa Medal by Indian Red Cross Society, which is an award for excellence in nursing in India. In 1961, the Government of India honoured her social work with a Padma Shri title and later Jamnalal Bajaj Award in 1980.
