= Ramesh Jain =

American computer scientist

Ramesh C Jain
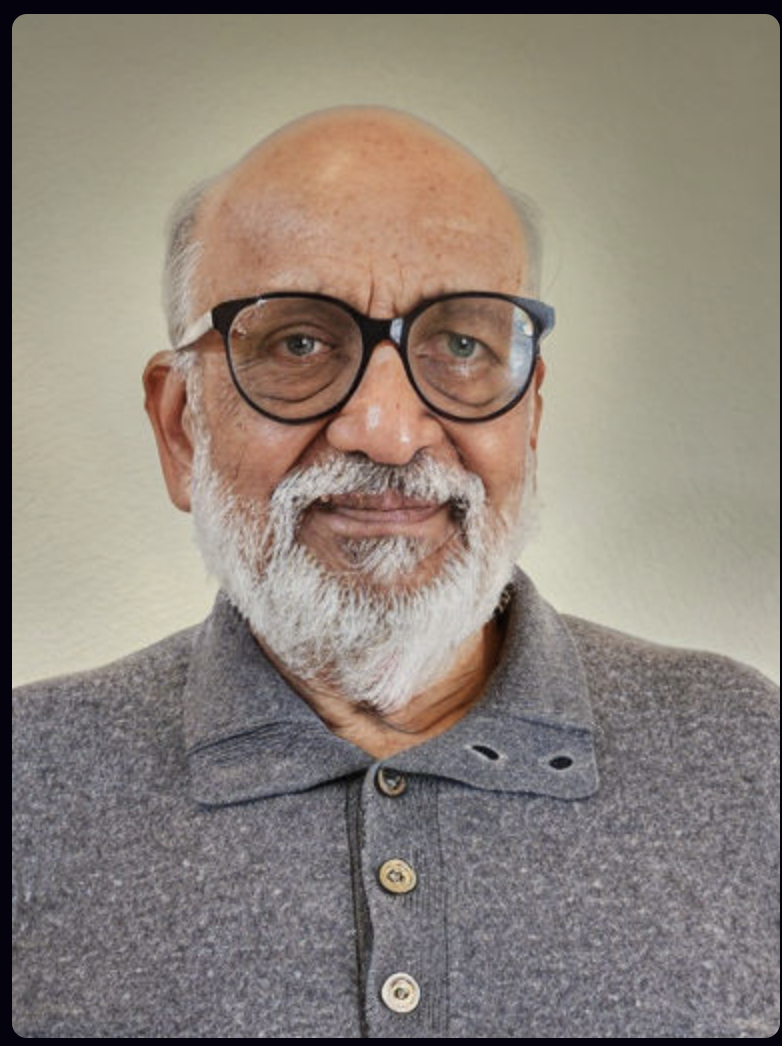
- Born: 8 June 1949 (age 77); Nagpur, India
- Education: Indian Institute of Technology, Kharagpur; Visvesvaraya National Institute of Technology Nagpur
- Known for: Dynamic vision, multimedia computing, navigational approach to health, food computing
- Scientific career
- Fields: Control theory Computer vision Artificial intelligence Multimedia; Digital health
- Workplaces: Indian Institute of Technology, Kharagpur; University of Hamburg; University of Texas, Austin; Wayne State University; University of Michigan; University of California, San Diego; Georgia Tech; University of California, Irvine; National University of Singapore; Stanford University
- Doctoral students: Yi Lu Murphey

Ramesh Chandra Jain (born 8 June 1949) is a scientist and entrepreneur in the field of information and computer science. He is a Distinguished Professor Emeritus in the Department of Computer Science, Donald Bren School of Information and Computer Sciences, University of California, Irvine.

== Education ==
He graduated with a bachelor's degree from Visvesvaraya National Institute of Technology, Nagpur, India and has a Ph.D. in electronics engineering (1975) from Indian Institute of Technology, Kharagpur, India.

== Career ==
Ramesh Jain has been a researcher, an entrepreneur, and an educator. His activities have been mostly in the areas of Computer Vision, Artificial Intelligence, Multimedia and using these to build real world systems, particularly to enhance health and societal well-being.

Jain joined IIT Kharagpur as a faculty member in 1972. In 1976 he went to Germany to join Prof. H. H. Nagel’s group in computer vision at University of Hamurg, He moved to USA in 1978. In 1987, Jain became the founding director of the Artificial Intelligence (AI) Lab at the University of Michigan, where he began his work on multimedia computing, computer vision, and AI. His work in these areas helped shape the development of AI-driven health technologies and contributed to foundational research in computer science.

He served as Chairman of ACM SIG Multimedia.

He served in academic positions at many universities. He served as a professor of computer science and engineering at the University of Michigan, Ann Arbor and the University of California, San Diego; in each case he founded and directed artificial intelligence and visual information systems labs. He served as Farmer Professor at Georgia Tech from 2002 to 2004. In 2005 he was named the first Bren Professor in Information and Computer Science for the Donald Bren School of Information and Computer Sciences, University of California, Irvine.

He was the founding Editor-in-Chief of IEEE MultiMedia magazine and the Machine Vision and Applications journal. He still serves on the editorial boards of several journals. He has been elected a Fellow of the Association for Computing Machinery (ACM), the Institute of Electrical and Electronics Engineers (IEEE), the International Association for Pattern Recognition (IAPR), the Association for the Advancement of Artificial Intelligence (AAAI), American Association for Advancement of Science (AAAS), and the Society for Optics and Photonics Technology (SPIE). He has published over 400 research papers in scientific journals and conferences.

=== ^{Entrepreneurship} ===
He founded or co-founded multiple startup companies including Imageware, Virage, Praja, and Seraja. Virage is considered the first company to address photo and video management applications that have become central to human experience in digital world.

Notable among them is Personicle.org, an open-source platform for personalized health management, and HealthUnity.org, which promotes open data for health research.

== Research ==
His research interests started in cybernetic systems. That interest brought him to research in pattern recognition, computer vision. and artificial intelligence. He was the coauthor of the first computer vision paper addressing analysis of real video sequence of a traffic scene. After working on several aspects of computer vision systems and coauthoring a text book in machine vision, he realized that to solve hard computer vision problem one must include all other available information from other signals and contextual sources. This realization resulted in his becoming active in developing multimedia computing systems. His contributions to developing visual information management systems influenced many researchers. He also participated in developing concept of immersive as well as multiple perspective interactive videos, to use multiple video cameras to build three dimensional video where a person can decide what they want to experience. His research in multimedia computing convinced him that experiences are central human knowledge acquisition and use, resulting in his interest in 'experiential computing' Since 2012, he has been engaged in developing a navigational approach to guide people in their lifestyle for achieving their personal health goals. Since food is one of the most important component of human lifestyle and is so central to all aspects of human society, he is working with several international researchers in the area of food computing

His early work in multimedia computing and AI helped lay the groundwork for the integration of these technologies into health applications, particularly in terms of data processing and user interaction.

Jain’s work in experiential computing focuses on the idea of creating systems that adapt to individual users’ needs and behaviors.

Jain’s vision for personalized healthcare revolves around integrating data from various sources (e.g., wearable sensors, genetic data, environmental information) to create individualized health models. At the UCI Institute for Future Health, Jain’s team works on developing systems for continuous health monitoring that provide actionable insights to users in real-time, ultimately helping individuals optimize their lifestyles to maintain good health.

=== Personal Health Navigator ===
Jain is perhaps best known for leading the development of the Personal Health Navigator, an innovative application that combines lifestyle, environmental, and health data to provide personalized advice for improving health. The Personal Health Navigator is designed to be used on mobile phones, offering users continuous guidance to optimize their health, manage chronic conditions, and achieve health goals. This project has gained international recognition, and its standards are being adopted globally by the International Organization for Standardization (ISO).

== Views and advocacy ==
Jain is an advocate for the future of personalized, tech-driven healthcare. He believes that traditional healthcare systems, which rely heavily on hospitals and clinics, should evolve toward more personalized and accessible models that allow individuals to take control of their health on a daily basis. His vision involves leveraging AI, machine learning, and real-time data to monitor health continuously, making it possible for individuals to optimize their lifestyle and avoid health issues before they require medical intervention.

== Recognition and awards ==
=== Fellowships ===
- Association for Computing Machinery (ACM)
- Institute of Electrical and Electronics Engineers (IEEE)
- American Association for the Advancement of Science (AAAS)
- International Association for Pattern Recognition (IAPR)
- American Association for Artificial Intelligence (AAAI)
- Society of Photo-Optical Instrumentation Engineers (SPIE)

Awards

- ACM Distinguished Service Award (2022) for his leadership in establishing SIGMultiMedia
- ACM SIGMM Technical Achievement Award
- IEEE TCMC Impact Award for pioneering contributions to multimedia computing
- IEEE Meritorious Service Award for his dedication to the field of computing

== Selected publications ==
=== Journals ===
- Jain, R.; Worring, M.; Santini, S.; Gupta, A.; Smeulders, A.W.M. (2000). "Content-based image retrieval at the end of the early years". IEEE Transactions on Pattern Analysis and Machine Intelligence. 22 (12): 1349–1380. doi:10.1109/34.895972.
- Jain, Ramesh; Sebe, Nicu; Djeraba, Chabane; Lew, Michael S. (1 February 2006). "Content-based multimedia information retrieval: State of the art and challenges". ACM Trans. Multimedia Comput. Commun. Appl. 2 (1): 1–19. doi:10.1145/1126004.1126005.
- Jain, Ramesh; Pandey, Vaibhav; Putzel, Preston J.; Bhimaraju, Hari; Krishnan, Srikanth; Nag, Nitish (15 October 2018). "Cross-Modal Health State Estimation". Proceedings of the 26th ACM international conference on Multimedia. pp. 1993–2002. arXiv:1808.06462. doi:10.1145/3240508.3241913. ISBN 978-1-4503-5665-7. PMC 6530992. PMID 31131378.
- Antani, Sameer; Kasturi, Rangachar; Jain, Ramesh (1 April 2002). "A survey on the use of pattern recognition methods for abstraction, indexing and retrieval of images and video". Pattern Recognition. 35 (4): 945–965. Bibcode:2002PatRe..35..945A. doi:10.1016/S0031-3203(01)00086-3. ISSN 0031-3203.
- Coleman, E. North; Jain, Ramesh (1 April 1982). "Obtaining 3-dimensional shape of textured and specular surfaces using four-source photometry". Computer Graphics and Image Processing. 18 (4): 309–328. doi:10.1016/0146-664X(82)90001-6. ISSN 0146-664X.
- Hampapur, A.; Weymouth, T.; Jain, R. (15 October 1994). "Digital video segmentation". Proceedings of the second ACM international conference on Multimedia - MULTIMEDIA '94. pp. 357–364. doi:10.1145/192593.192699. ISBN 0-89791-686-7.

== Books ==
- Jalali, Laleh; Jain, Ramesh (2021). Event mining for explanatory modeling. New York, NY: Association for Computing Machinery. ISBN 978-1450384827.
- Gupta, Amarnath; Jain, Ramesh (2011). Managing Event Information (1st 2011 ed.). Cham: Springer International Publishing. p. 127. ISBN 9783031018824.
- Jain, Ramesh; Grosky, William I; Mehrortra, Rajiv (1997). The handbook of multimedia information management. Upper Saddle River, NJ: Prentice Hall PTR. p. 499. ISBN 9780132073257.
- Jain, Ramesh; Jain, Anil K. (1990). "Report: 1988 NSF Range Image Understanding Workshop". Analysis and Interpretation of Range Images. Springer. pp. 1–31. doi:10.1007/978-1-4612-3360-2_1. ISBN 978-1-4612-3360-2.
- Shah, Mubarak (1997). Motion-Based Recognition. Dordrecht: Springer Netherlands. p. 374. ISBN 9780792346180.
- Jain, Ramesh; Kasturi, Rangachar; Schunck, Brian K. (1995). Machine vision. New York: McGraw-Hill. ISBN 0-07-032018-7.
- Smeulders, Arnold; Jain, Ramesh (1998). Image Databases and Multi-Media Search. p. 328. doi:10.1142/3656. ISBN 978-981-4496-67-4.
