= Gangadhar Rao Chitnavis =

Indian landholder and politician

Sir Gangadhar Rao Chitnavis KCIE (1862 – ?) was an Indian landholder and politician in the Central Provinces, British India.

== Background and family ==
Chitnavis belonged to the prominent Chitnavis family of Nagpur, a Chandraseniya Kayastha Prabhu family that had followed the Bhonsla rulers from Berar to Nagpur in the middle of the eighteenth century. At Bhonsla court of Nagpur, Chitnavis had served as secretaries and ministers until the middle of the nineteenth century.

He was son of Madhav Rao Chitnavis. His brother Shankar Madhav Chitnavis was a Statutory officer and worked a deputy commissioner of Central Province.

His son Madhav Gangadhar Chitnavis established five charitable and religious trusts namely Sir Gangadharrao Chitnavis Memorial Medical Research Trust, Smt. Dadimay Memorial Medical Research Research, Balkrishna Deosthan Trust, Sant Sonaji Maharaj Trust and the Gopalkrishna Deosthan Trust. His residence Chitnavis wada, a listed heritage building, is now owned by the Gopalkrishna Deosthan Trust.

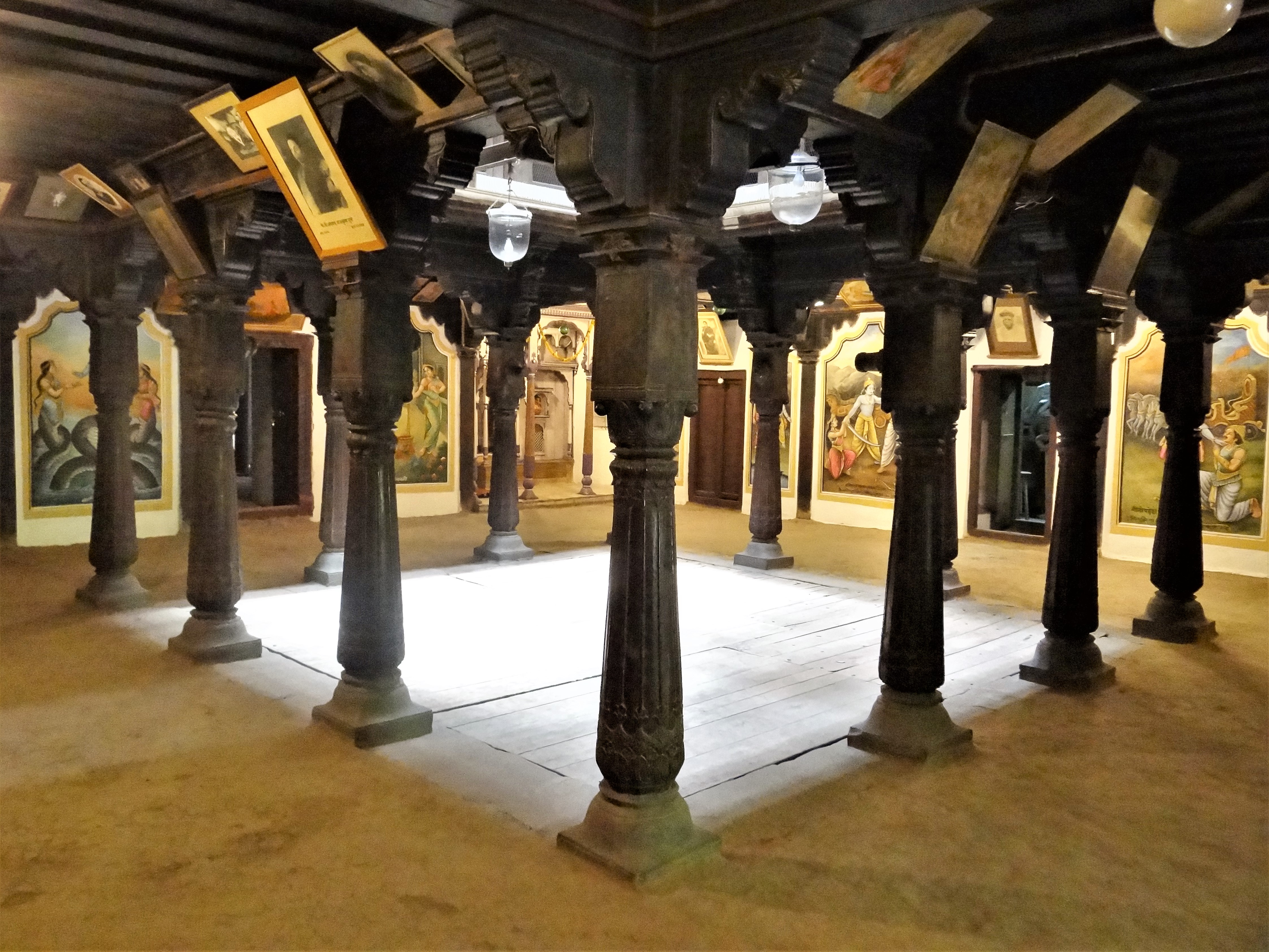
Chitnavis Wada

== Career ==
Chitnavis was president of the Nagpur Municipality. He was appointed as a member of the Imperial Legislative Council in 1893 and represented the Landholders Constituency from the Central Provinces and Berar for several years.

In 1902, he was chosen to represent the Central Provinces at the coronation in London of King Edward VII and Queen Alexandra.

He was Governor-appointed President of First and Second Legislative Council of Central Provinces and Berar from 1921 to 1923 and from 1923 to 1926. He was a member of the Indian National Congress.

== Honours ==
Gangadhar Rao was awarded CIE by the British Government on 25 May 1895 and later knighted as a KCIE in a special honours list on 12 December 1911.
