= Dinesh Keskar =

Indian businessman

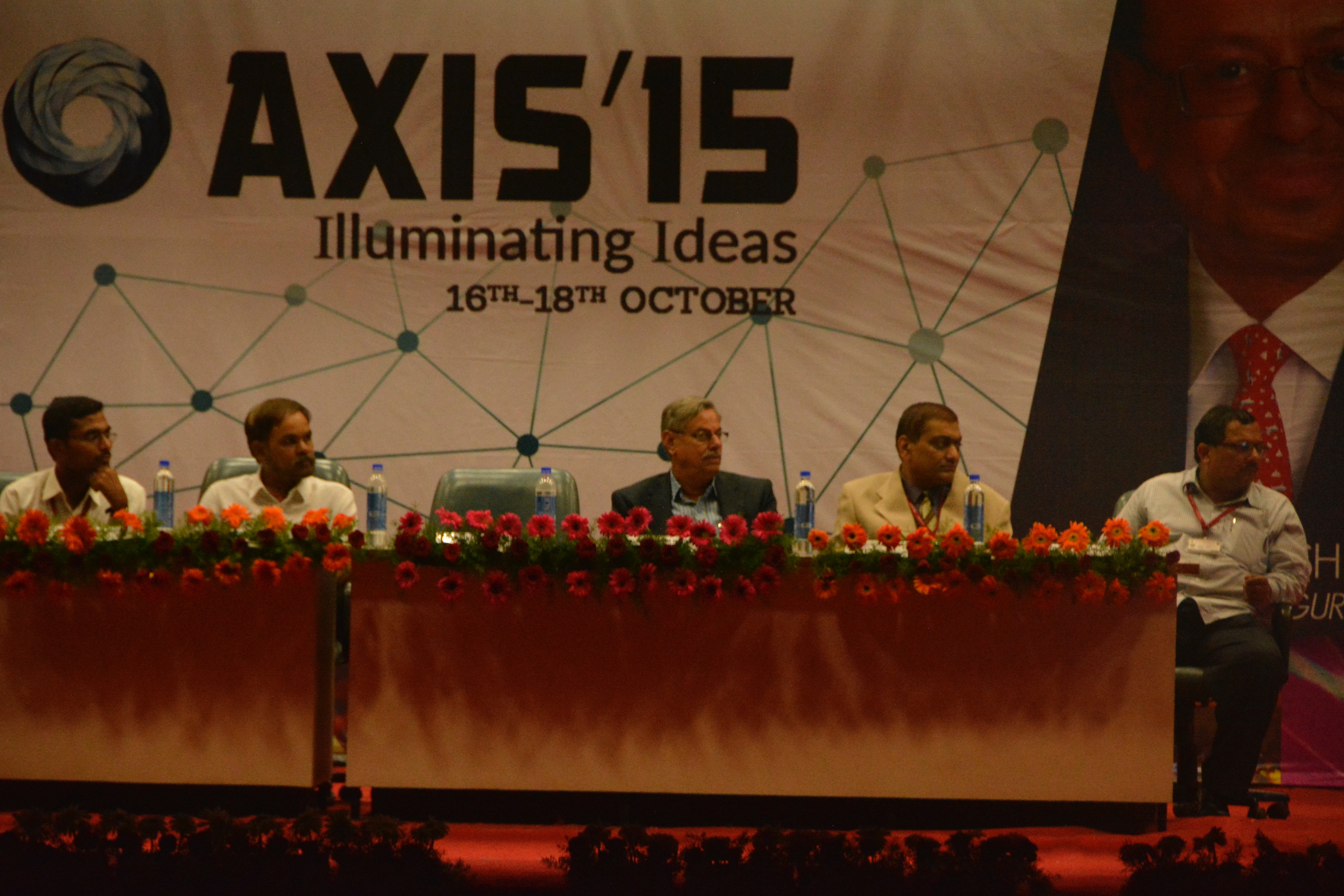
- Dinesh Keskar at AXIS
- Born: दिनेश केसकर; 25 July 1954 (age 72); Rajkot, India
- Education: Visvesvaraya National Institute of Technology, (B.S., 1975); University of Cincinnati (M.S., 1976); City University of Seattle (M.B., 1987); University of California, Berkeley
- Scientific career
- Workplaces: Langley Research Center; Boeing Commercial Airplanes

Dinesh Keskar (born 25 July 1954) is senior vice president of sales in Asia-Pacific and India at Boeing Commercial Airplanes.

== Early life ==
Keskar was born in 1954 in Rajkot, India. His father was a teacher at the Dharmendra Singhji College, while his grandfather was a renowned academician and statistician. He is the second-born in his family and have two brothers; Nalini and Achyut. When Keskar was five, his family move to Amravati, Maharashtra where he and his brothers learned Marathi language.

== Education ==
At the Manibai Gujarati High School, Amravati, from which Keskar graduated after completing 8th grade, he was the top merit student. Upon completion, his father bought him a scooter before he died in a car accident in Mumbai. Dr. Keskar received his bachelor's degree in mechanical engineering from Visvesvaraya National Institute of Technology with a gold medal in 1975. He received his master's and doctorate degrees in aerospace engineering from the University of Cincinnati in 1976 and 1978, respectively, under the supervision of Neil Armstrong. While employed by Boeing, he received his Master's of Business Administration from City University of Seattle in 1987 and attended the Berkeley Executive Program at the University of California, Berkeley in 1994.

== Career ==
Keskar joined Boeing in June 1980 and since that year was promoted to various senior positions in fields of engineering, marketing and sales. From 1980 to 1986, he was a researcher and consultant in system identification, digital signal processing and control theory. Dinesh Keskar is known for the development of techniques to conduct flight tests by using its data to obtain airplane math models to simulate flight of such Boeing airliners as 737, 747, 757 and 767. Prior to his appointment at Boeing, Keslar used to work at the Flight Dynamics and Control Division of NASA's Langley Research Center.

From 1987 to 1995, Keskar was a director of International Sales, where he managed Boeing's airplane sales in India, and was responsible for managing negotiations between Boeing and government-operated Air India and Indian Airlines. From 1995 to 2000, Keskar served as president of Boeing India and since that year forward, was vice president for Sales and president of its Aircraft Trading. Until 2005, while serving on those posts, he was responsible for marketing of all types of aircraft, owned by Boeing, to customers worldwide.

In 2004 Keskar served as vice president of Boeing Commercial Airplanes, where he was responsible for overseeing commercial airliners sales in South and Southeast Asia. From 2009 and until February 2012 he served as vice president of Boeing International and president of Boeing India.

== Honors ==
- Fellow of the American Institute of Aeronautics and Astronautics
