= Shankar Mahale =

Indian revolutionary (1925–1943)

- शंकर महाले
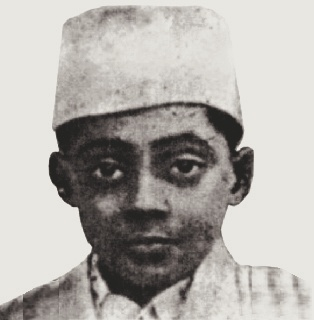
- Born: 18 January 1925; Nawabpura, Nagpur, Maharastra, India
- Died: 19 January 1943 (aged 18); Nagpur Central Jail, Nagpur, Maharastra
- Cause of death: Execution by hanging
- Known for: Participation in Quit India Movement

Shankar Mahale (शंकर महाले, Marathi pronunciation: [ʃəŋkəɾ məɦaːləi]; 18 January 1925 – 19 January 1943) was an Indian revolutionary from Maharashtra who opposed the British Raj. He was arrested along with four other people in the case of the death of a policeman and was later sentenced to death, making him one of the youngest martyrs of the Indian Independence Movement. He was educated up to the fourth standard when he quit school. He joined Mahatma Gandhi's Quit India Movement in 1942 and held a job as a mill worker in Nagpur while participating in the movement. Mahale was 18 years and 1 day old at the time of his hanging.

== Early life and activism ==
Shankar was born on 18 January 1925 in Nagpur, Maharashtra. He dropped out of Government School after the fourth standard because of what he considered rash behavior from British teachers and Indian students. Shankar continued to study history and politics at home under his father Dajiba Mahale, who was a teacher. Shankar joined the Quit India Movement at the age of seventeen after Mahatma Gandhi's "Do or Die" speech. Starting on 9 August 1942, Shankar took part in a strike in protest of the ill treatment of factory workers. The protest, during which government offices and police outposts were set on fire, lasted until the 11th.

== Death ==
Shankar's father Dajiba Mahale was shot to death by police while participating in the Quit India Movement in 1942. In retaliation, Shankar and his colleagues raided the Nagpur police station on the night of 13 August 1942. They raided the police station armed with batons, resulting in the death of a policeman. As they seized arms and ammunition, they were surrounded by armed police reinforcements and eventually captured.

Shankar and his colleagues were put on trial facing capital punishment. Mahale claimed he was solely responsible for the death of the policeman (he later stated his father would not have wanted him to plead for a milder sentence). Ultimately, he was sentenced to death while his colleagues were sentenced to life in prison. Shankar Mahale was executed by hanging on January 19, 1943, at Nagpur Central Jail. His conspirators' sentences were commuted after the Republic of India was formed.

== Legacy ==
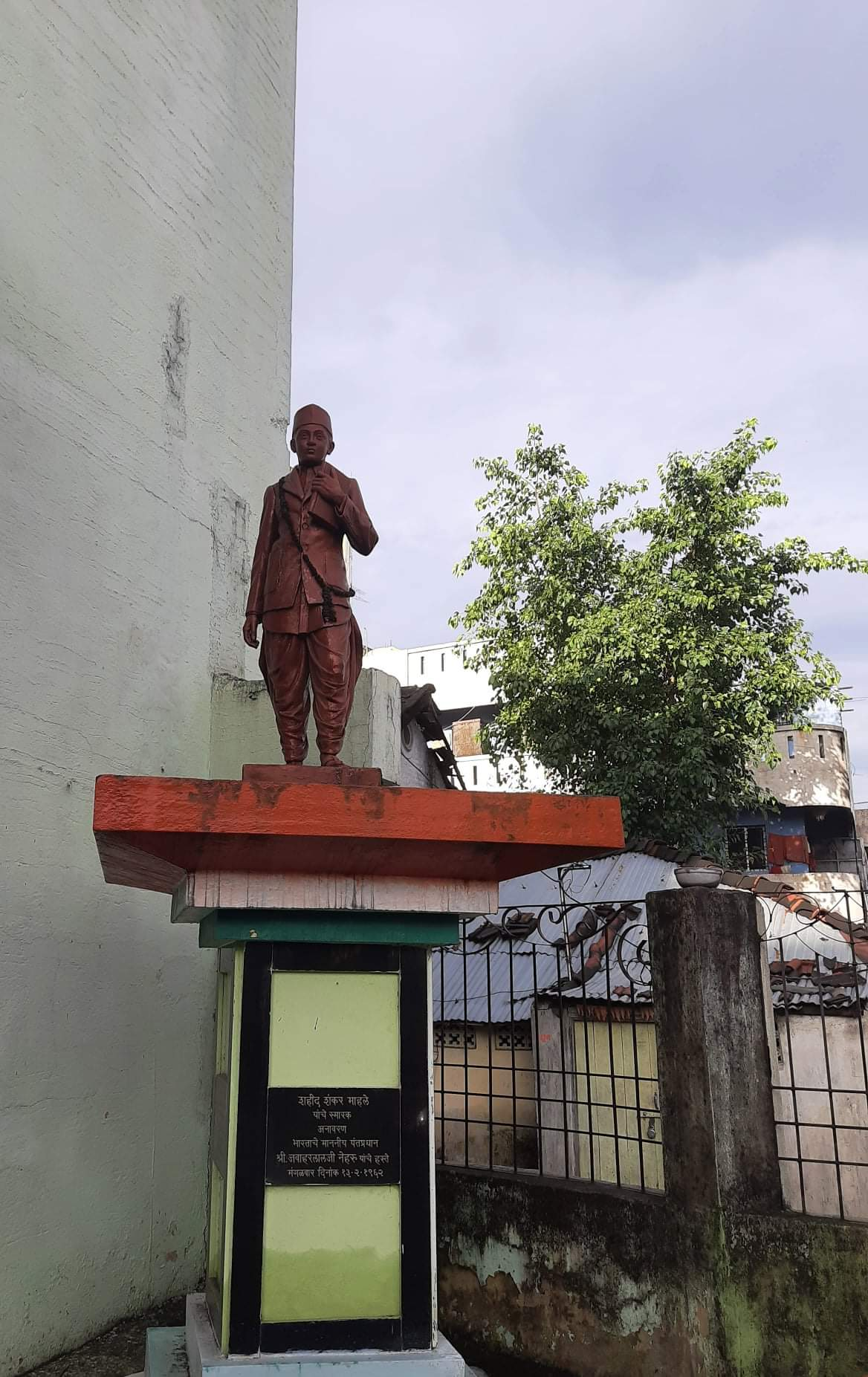
Martyr Shankar Mahale Statue in Maharashtra

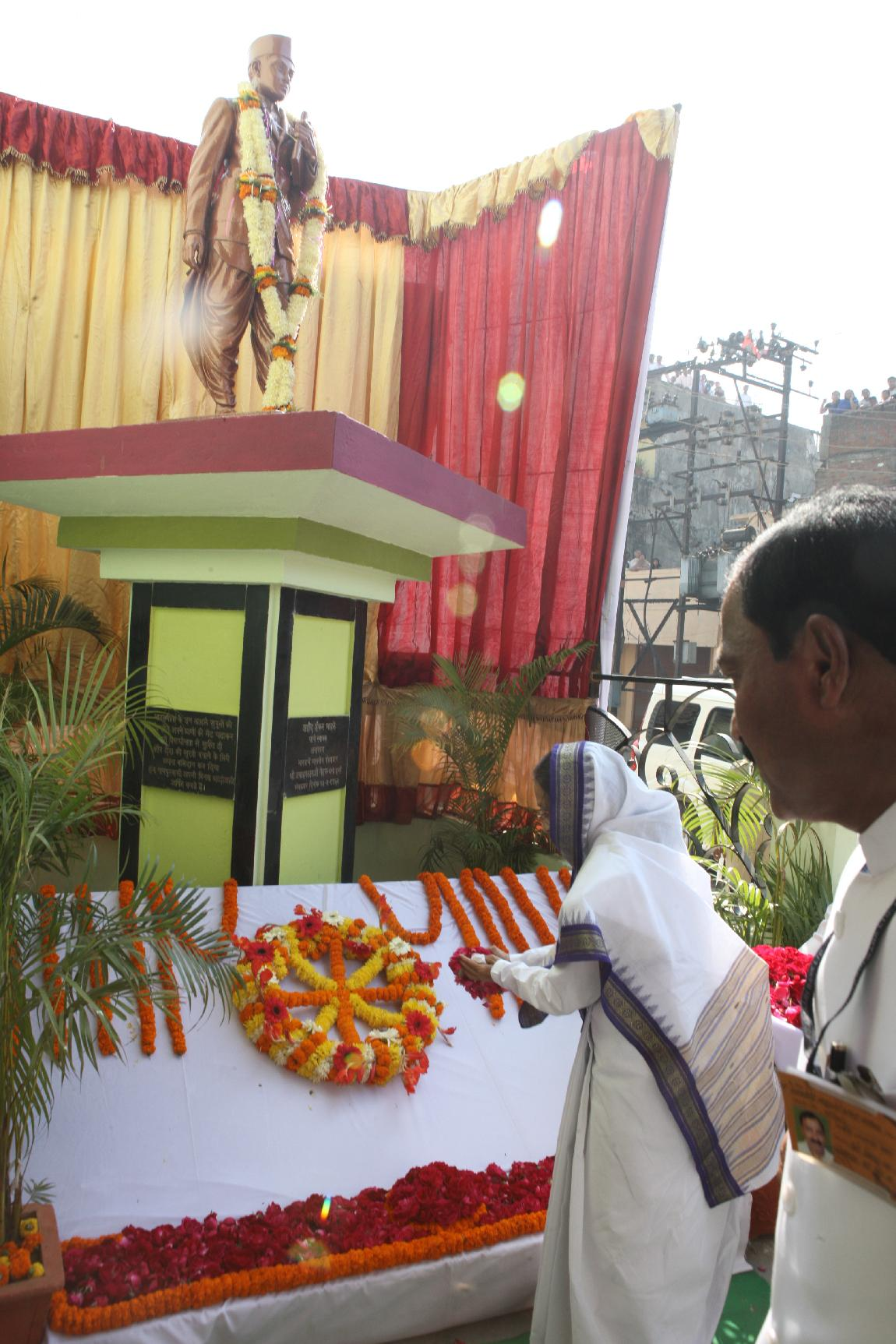
Shrimati Pratibha Patil honors the martyr Shankar Mahale Statue.

Pandit Jawaharlal Nehru had a statue of Shankar Mahale erected in his honor at Nagpur Chowk.

Later Pratibha Patil, the 12th President of India had a small memorial built in the honor of the martyr Shankar on 17 February 2011.
