= Walter Maude =

British administrator in India

Sir Walter Maude KCIE CSI (1862 – 2 May 1943) was a British administrator in India.

Maude was born in Highgate, London, and was educated at Highgate School and Balliol College, Oxford. He joined the Indian Civil Service in 1881 and went out to India in 1883, being posted to Bengal. In 1912, he transferred to the new province of Bihar and Orissa, where he was to spend the rest of his career, as a Member of the Board of Revenue. He became a member of the Governor's Executive Council in 1917 and the president of the Provincial Legislature in 1921. He retired in 1921 and returned to live in Jersey and then Guernsey, but left for England before the German invasion in 1940.

He was appointed Companion of the Order of the Star of India (CSI) in 1914 and Knight Commander of the Order of the Indian Empire (KCIE) in the 1920 New Year Honours.
