= Sanjay Joshi =

Indian politician

Sanjay Vinayak Joshi
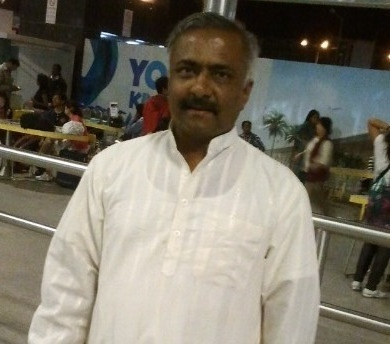
- Sanjay Vinayak Joshi greets his followers

National General Secretary (Organization), Bharatiya Janata Party
- In office 2001-2005
- Preceded by: Narendra Modi
- Succeeded by: Ram Lal

Personal details
- Born: 6 April 1962 (age 64) Nagpur, Maharashtra, India
- Citizenship: Indian
- Party: Bharatiya Janata Party
- Education: Visvesvaraya National Institute of Technology, Nagpur
- Occupation: Politician
- Website: sanjayvinayakjoshi.com

Sanjay Vinayak Joshi is an Indian politician belonging to the Bharatiya Janata Party. He was a long-time member of the Gujarat BJP and was a member of the BJP national executive until he was forced to resign after public pressure. During his 2001-2005 tenure as National General Secretary (Organization), he led the organization that enabled BJP to win the Assembly elections in nine states (Himachal Pradesh, Uttarakhand, Chhattisgarh, Jharkhand, Jammu and Kashmir, Bihar, West Bengal, Orissa and Madhya Pradesh).

== Background ==
Joshi was born in Nagpur on 6 April 1962. A mechanical engineer from VNIT, Nagpur by training, Joshi was a lecturer in an engineering college, but he resigned to become a full-time pracharak in the nationalist Rashtriya Swayamsevak Sangh (RSS) in Maharashtra. Noting his organizational acumen, he was asked to join BJP in Gujarat in 1988, where the party was politically weak. He is known for his good rapport with grass root level workers.

Joshi became a leading figure in BJP politics in Gujarat. From 1988 to 1995, he worked closely with Narendra Modi as a secretary of Gujarat BJP. A former colleague, Gordhan Zadafia has said of him that he is "a silent worker with immense capability and is popular and loved by party workers, while Modi has a dictatorial attitude.". Joshi was viewed as a bachelor who had dedicated his life to the party.

== Public feud with Narendra Modi ==
After a revolt by Shankersinh Vaghela, Narendra Modi was shunted out, and BJP won in the subsequent elections in 1998. Joshi became the general secretary of BJP in Gujarat. In 2001, BJP Central leadership removed Keshubhai Patel and allowed Modi to become chief minister. Since then Joshi has been the focus of several of Modi's actions.

=== Resignation from BJP national executive ===
In May 2012, it was reported that Modi had called Gadkari, threatening to boycott the BJP national meet unless Joshi was removed from the BJP. In what is widely seen as an erosion of the BJP president's power, Joshi was forced to resign from the BJP executive, and within two hours, Modi announced his decision to attend the BJP meet. The RSS chief Mohan Bhagwat expressed his displeasure at this treatment of Joshi.

In July 2012, Joshi sought security cover z++ category from the Home Ministry as according to him there was threat to his life and had received threatening letters and calls on his mobile phone from a person named Rasool Khan.

In May 2013, Modi again lobbied for non-inclusion of Joshi in an important electoral committee of the BJP. In his tussle with Modi, Joshi apparently enjoys the support of several RSS groups, and also former BJP chief Rajnath Singh, and others.

Currently Joshi has no assignment with BJP; He stays in Central Delhi. His place of residence is full of political activity with senior BJP leaders and party workers wants to meet him. As party man with strong backing in RSS, Sanjay Joshi played an important role in organization building in Nagpur.

== Political views ==
=== Praise for Narendra Modi ===
Sanjay Joshi has given a series of statements praising the functioning of the National Democratic Alliance (NDA) Government at center and PM Narendra Modi. Joshi said Narendra Modi is my leader.

Joshi speaking as a chief guest at a seminar - Nationalism and Indian culture, Basics of social equality organized by a group of Rashtriya Swayamsevak Sangh (RSS) volunteers and BJP workers under the banner of Deen Dayal Sewa Pratishthan on the birth of Swami Vivekananda declared that Modi is his leader and showered praise on him for getting international recognition for Yoga.

=== Criticism of Rahul Gandhi for airing views against revocation of Article 370 ===
Sanjay Joshi has criticised Rahul Gandhi for his remarks against revocation of Article 370 at multiple forums including the Jan Ashirwad rally in Kaithal on 2 September 2019. He praised the bold step taken by the BJP government at the centre of revoking Article 370 of the Indian Constitution while lashed out at Congress Leaders, who criticised the move.

=== Ram Temple ruling ===
In anticipation of the Supreme Court ruling on Ram Temple, on 16 October 2019, Sanjay Joshi expressed displeasure that Babri Action Committee could not settle the issue out of court and that the matter should not have reached the Hon'ble Supreme court. Sanjay Joshi expressed that people have faith in the highest court of justice and that the common man's emotions shall be taken care of, in the final judgement on Ram Temple.

=== Citizenship Amendment Act ===
Mr Joshi applauded the BJP in government bill for Citizenship Amendment Act and praised the Parliament for its smooth passage in both Houses of Parliament on 23rd Dec 2019. According to the Bill, members of the Hindu, Christian, Sikh, Buddhist and Zoroastrian communities who have come from Pakistan, Afghanistan, and Bangladesh till December 31, 2014 and facing religious persecution there will not be treated as illegal immigrants but given Indian citizenship. It also relaxes the provisions for "Citizenship by naturalisation". The law reduces duration of residency from existing 11 years to just five years for people belonging to the same six religions and three countries. In his opinion, CAA will provide much needed relief to 6 communities who have faced religious persecution in the 3 Islamic nations. The Act shall enable the 6 religious communities to lead a life of dignity in India as Indian citizens.
