= Nemkumar Banthia =

Indian-born Canadian civil engineer

Nemkumar Banthia PhD, P.Eng, FRSC
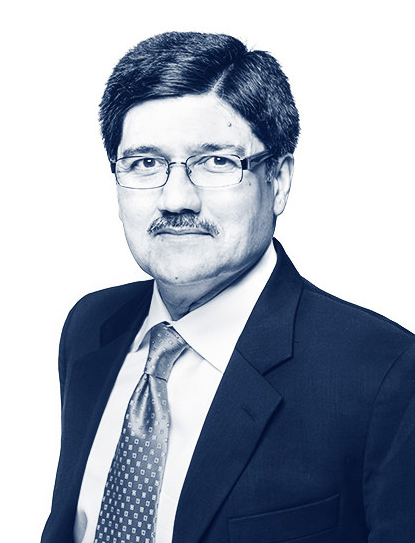
- Born: Nemkumar Patel; 1959 (age 66–67); Nagpur, India
- Education: IIT Delhi (Master); University of British Columbia (PhD)
- Occupations: University Killam Professor, Researcher
- Website: https://www.civil.ubc.ca/faculty/nemkumar-banthia

Nemkumar Banthia FRSC, (born 1959) is an Indian-born Canadian engineer and professor of civil engineering at the University of British Columbia and the CEO of IC-IMPACTS. He is best known for his research in the fields of cement-based and polymer-based fiber reinforced composites, particularly on testing and standardization, fracture behavior, strain-rate effects, durability and development of sustainable materials.

== Early life ==
Banthia was born in 1959 in Nagpur, India. Growing up in India, he was concerned with the poor quality of housing, poor quality of water, and the little state of transportation infrastructure. This further motivated him to pursue a field where he could transform societies and create healthy communities and vibrant economies by creating proper infrastructure. He obtained a Bachelor of Engineering degree from Nagpur University and a Master of Technology in structural engineering in 1982, from the Indian Institute of Technology, New Delhi. Banthia then moved to Canada where he obtained his doctorate in Civil Engineering Materials from UBC in 1987.

== Career ==
Banthia's main area of research is fiber-reinforced composites and is he is credited for his contributions to the fundamental understanding of sprayed concrete including particle and fiber kinematics, rebound modeling, in-situ quality control and performance characterization. Banthia is a Tier 1 Canada Research Chair and previous Distinguished University Scholar at the University of British Columbia. He is also a fellow of the American Concrete Institute, the Canadian Society for Civil Engineering, the Indian Concrete Institute, the Canadian Academy of Engineering and the Indian National Academy of Engineering.

=== University of British Columbia ===
Banthia was first appointed as an associate professor at UBC in 1992 and later promoted to professor in 1997. He leads the Civil Engineering Materials group, also known as SIERA (Sustainable InfrastructurE ReseArch). With Banthia's leadership, the group is extremely experienced in the field of composites and is well known for its extensive research in the field of fibre reinforcement, including shotcrete applications. Banthia was recognized by the university's Distinguished University Scholar (DUS) program and received an award in 2003.

Banthia has developed a number of novel methodologies for fibers use in concrete and shotcrete reinforcement, developed a family of fibres for reinforcing Portland cement-based materials, pioneered research in microfiber-reinforced cement composites for civil applications, demonstrated use of fiber-reinforced polymers (FRPs) in new construction and repairs. Some more specific topics of current and planned research include mechanical properties and durability of Portland cement concrete (plain and fibre-reinforced); permeability of Portland cement concrete; shotcrete (wet and dry processes); shrinkage, cracking and durability; impact/blast resistance of concrete and fiber reinforced concrete; use of fiber reinforced plastic composites for new construction and repair, and use of recycled materials in concrete.

=== IC-IMPACTS ===
In 2012, Banthia was named Scientific Director of the India-Canada Centre for Innovative Multidisciplinary Partnerships to Accelerate Community Transformation and Sustainability (IC-IMPACTS). IC-IMPACTS is the first, Canada-India Research Centre of Excellence established through the Canadian Networks of Centres of Excellence (NCE) as a Centre dedicated to the development of research collaborations between Canada and India. A number of projects led by Banthia at IC-IMPACTS have been covered by media outlets globally.

== Committees ==
Banthia has served on numerous committees and is currently actively involved with CSA: Canadian Highway Bridge Design Code (CHBDC) as the Chair of Technical Subcommittee on Durability. He also serves on editorial boards of eight international journals and is the editor-in-chief of the Journal of Cement and Concrete Composites. With a citeScore of 10.9 and an impact factor of 6.257 the journal has one of the highest impact factor in the field.

== Conferences and seminars ==
Through seminars and other events, Banthia contributes towards continuing education of practicing engineers, graduate students and other institutions, business personnel and technicians.

Some of his most recent involvements, with international conferences, include:

- Chair Steering Committee, PROTECT2017
- Conference co-chair CONSEC2016
- Conference chair, BEFIB 2016
- Conference co-chair, ACMBS-XI
- Chair Steering Committee, PROTECT2015
- Conference chair, ConMat'15

== Publications ==
Banthia has more than 450 research publications with an outstanding H-index value of 48 (Web of Science). To date, he holds nine patents, has published over 450 refereed papers and over 30 books, edited volumes, and special journal issues.

== Awards and honours ==
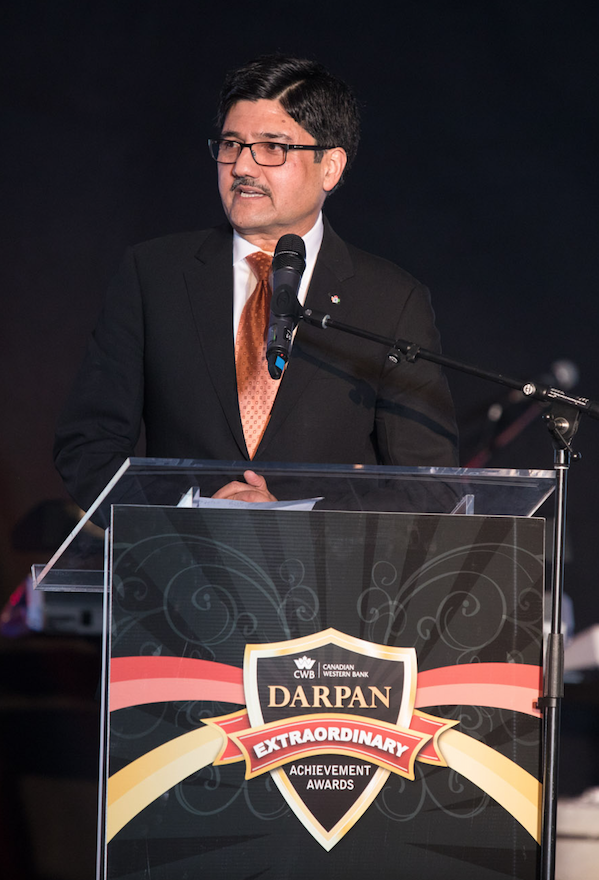
2017 Darpan Achievement Award for Industry Marvel

Banthia was inducted as a Distinguished University Scholar at UBC in 2003 and was appointed as a Senior Canada Research Chair in Infrastructure Rehabilitation and Sustainability in 2006. He was honoured by the British Columbia Innovation Council by its Solutions Through Research Award and jointly by the Seoul National University and the Korea Concrete Institute by their Distinguished Researcher Award. Some of Banthia's recent academic and professional awards and distinctions include:

- Distinguished Alumni Award by the IIT-Delhi Alumni Association, October 2020.
- Global Citizenship Award received at the alumni UBC Achievement Awards, November 2018.
- Industry Marvel Award by Darpan Magazine, September 2017.
- World CSR Excellence Award of Global CSR Foundation, March 2017. Award given in Mumbai, India.
- Drishti Award for Innovations in Science and Technology, November 2015.
- Special Commemorative Conference organized by American Concrete Institute to honor N. Banthia in Mumbai, India, December 2015.
- Best Paper Award from the Int. J of Civil Structural Health Monitoring [Paper in 1:25-35, 2011] Award presented in November 2013.
- Aftab Mufti Medal of the International Society for Structural Health Monitoring of Intelligent Infrastructure (ISHMII) November 2013.
- Horst Leipholz Medal, Canadian Society for Civil Engineering (2012).
- Killam Research Prize, UBC (2012).
- Leadership in Science and Technology, Drishti (2016).
- Distinguished Alumnus Award, UBC (2018).
- University Killam Professor, UBC (2023).

== In the media ==
Banthia's innovative research work has been covered by different media outlets. A number of his research projects have received intense attention, including the development of the new coating material to protect concrete pipes from corrosion.

Banthia's work on the innovative carbon-neutral concrete coating, which is a product made from recycled material specifically designed to repair old and deteriorating sewer pipes, was featured in June 2021 in an article by The Weather Network.

The use of recycled vehicle tires as fibers in concrete to strengthen the material, add reinforcement, and enhance its properties has received significant interest. Use of recycled material in concrete helps in reducing its environmental impacts, hence the innovation has had positive feedback from the media.

Another well perceived project is the deployment of the famous self-healing road in Thondebhavi, India. The project has been highlighted as one of 2016's most transformative inventions and important scientific discoveries having the potential to impact millions of people. He has also been interviewed for his opinion on the safety of B.C.'s bridges and the need for more condition assessment.

Banthia's contributions to different communities through the work of IC-IMPACTS have been covered by Canadian news sources. In celebration of Canadian Water Week, IC-IMPACTS water projects and initiatives were featured in print copies of The Vancouver Sun and online articles in The Province and CBC in March 2017. The research work was highlighted during an interview on the CBC Radio show Quirks & Quarks which aired in January 2017.

In 2016, Banthia was featured on the cover of Drishti Magazine when he won the DRISHTI Award for Leadership in Science and Technology.
