= Philip Wylie Dumas =

Royal Navy Admiral (1868–1948)

Admiral Philip Wylie Dumas, CB, CVO (9 March 1868 – 11 December 1948) was a British Royal Navy officer. He was a noted advocate of the use of oil and of the internal combustion engine for naval vessels.

Dumas entered the Royal Navy cadet training ship HMS Britannia on 15 July 1881, and passed out as midshipman. He was promoted to lieutenant on 26 August 1890, shortly after he was posted to the Royal Yacht HMY Victoria and Albert, then promoted to commander on 31 December 1901. In early March 1903 he was posted to the HMS Pembrokefor torpedo duties in Fleet and Dockyard Reserves.

During the First World War, Dumas held a series of appointments at the Admiralty until 1917, when he was given command of HMS Agamemnon. He was promoted to rear-admiral in 1918 and retired. He was promoted on the retired list to vice-admiral in 1924 and to admiral on 21 January 1928.
