= Vikram Marwah =

Indian orthopedic surgeon and social worker (1925–2013)

Dr. Vikram Marwah
- Born: 4 June 1925; Shivni, Nagpur, Maharashtra, India
- Died: 6 November 2013 (aged 88); Nagpur, Maharashtra, India
- Resting place: Mokshadham
- Occupation: Orthopedic surgeon
- Known for: Medical and social service
- Spouse: Mrs. Mohini Marwah
- Children: 2; Dr. Pragati Marwah Vaid (Anesthetsiologist); Dr. Sanjay Marwah (Arthroscopy Surgeon)
- Awards: Padma Shri; Dr. B. C. Roy Award; A. A. Mehta Gold Medal; Sir Arthur Eyre Brook Award
- Website: Web site

Vikram Marwah (4 June 1925 – 6 November 2013) was an Indian orthopedic surgeon, social worker and the founder of Handicapped Children's Rehabilitation Centre and Children's Orthopedic Hospital of the Matru Sewa Sangh, Sitabuldi and Matrubhu Antargat Sanskar, a children's magazine. A winner of Dr. B. C. Roy Award, he was honored by the Government of India, in 2002, with the fourth highest Indian civilian award of Padma Shri.

== Biography ==
Vikram Marwah was born on 4 June 1925 in Shivni village of Nagpur district in the Western Indian state of Maharashtra. He graduated in medicine (MBBS) from Calcutta Medical College in 1948 and started his career as a medical volunteer serving the refugees of the freedom movement and the victims of draught affected areas in Bengal. Later, he pursued his higher studies and became a Fellow of the Royal College of Surgeons (FRCS) in 1956. He returned to India in 1961 and started working as a Professor of Surgery at Aurangabad where he worked till 1971. During this period, he is known to have established the departments of orthopedics and paraplegia. He received a scholarship from the Indian Council of Medical Research (ICMR) and the Commonwealth fellowship in 1971. The next year, he moved to the Government Medical College, Nagpur and worked there till his retirement from the government service in 1980 as the Dean of the college.

After retirement, Marwah founded the Handicapped Children's Rehabilitation Centre and Children's Orthopedic Hospital, in 1981, associated with the Matru Sewa Sangh, Sitabuldi for treating polio affected and physically challenged children and worked there for 20 years. He also founded the Matrubhu Antargat Sanskar, a magazine for children. A supporter of Hindi language, Marwah served as the vice president of the Hindi Rashtra Bhasha Prachar Samiiti and Vidharbha Seva Samiti. His contributions are also reported behind the establishment of Bharti Krishna Vidhya Vihar School and the organization of several surgical and blood donation camps.

Marwah, who is credited with 22 medical papers, was an approved examiner of post graduate courses in general surgery and orthopedics. A former president of the Indian Orthopedics Association and a co-founder of the Vidarbha Orthopaedic Society, he was a fellow of Johnson and Johnson and Smith and Nephew. He is a recipient of A. A. Mehta Gold Medal and Sir Arthur Eyre Brook award. In 1979, he received the Dr. B. C. Roy Award - Medical Teacher, the highest Indian award in the medical category. The Government of India honoured him with the civilian award of Padma Shri in 2002.

Vikram Marwah died at the age of 88 on 6 November 2013 succumbing to old age illnesses, leaving behind his wife and two children, a son and a daughter.

== See also ==
- Matru Sewa Sangh
- Government Medical College, Nagpur
