= Jack Marriott (Royal Navy officer) =

Royal Navy officer (1879–1938)

Captain Jack Marriott CMG
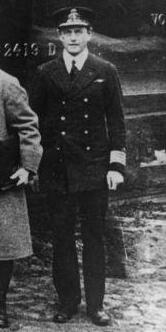
- Photograph of Marriott taken on 11 November 1918 after the signing of the armistice

Captain John Peter Ralph Marriott, CMG (28 November 1879 – 21 December 1938) was a Royal Navy officer who served in World War I.

Marriott was the son of Major Charles Frederick Marriott of the British Army and his wife Isabella (née Jerningham). He married Margaret Murray, daughter of the oceanographer Sir John Murray, and they had two sons, John and Peter. In 1894, he joined the Royal Navy as a Naval Cadet, and he was promoted to lieutenant on 1 April 1902. As a junior officer he was posted to the sloop HMS Beagle on 1 July 1902, serving on her in the South Atlantic. Later, he served in the light cruiser HMS Hyacinth, flagship of the East Indies and Egyptian Squadron, the armoured cruiser HMS Drake, flagship of the 5th Cruiser Squadron, and the cadet training cruiser HMS Cornwall. For two years he served on the staff of the Royal Naval College, Osborne.

In June 1914, he was promoted Commander and became executive officer of the cruiser HMS Charybdis. In Gallipoli, he was attached to the staff of the Australian and New Zealand Army Corps, and was mentioned in dispatches. He then became Naval Assistant to the First Sea Lord, Rosslyn Wemyss (whose flagship the Charybdis had been), at the Admiralty in London, with the rank of acting captain.

Representing Britain at the signing of the Armistice in a railway carriage in Compiègne Forest on 11 November 1918, he was witness to the end of World War I and a marked victory for the Allies. He was promoted to captain in December 1918. He later attended the Paris Peace Conference, 1919. In 1920 he was appointed Naval Attaché in Tokyo. He voluntarily retired in 1922 following the "Geddes Axe", hoping that by so doing he would save from compulsory retirement an officer who was less able to afford it. He was recalled for special service in Egypt during the period of tension over Abyssinia.

For his war service, he was appointed Companion of the Order of St Michael and St George (CMG) in the 1920 New Year Honours and also Chevalier of the Légion d'honneur, Commander of the Order of the Crown of Italy, Officer of the Order of the Nile and the Order of the Rising Sun.
