= Imperial Service Order =

Award to British Empire civil servants on retirement

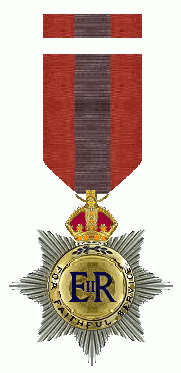
- Decoration as worn by gentlemen.

Awarded by Charles III
- Type: Order
- Established: August 1902
- Awarded for: Nationally important service
- Status: Currently constituted (only in Papua New Guinea)
- Sovereign: Charles III
- Grades: Companion
- Post-nominals: ISO
- Ribbon bar of the order

The Imperial Service Order was established by King Edward VII in August 1902. It was awarded on retirement to the administration and clerical staff of the Civil Service throughout the British Empire for long and meritorious service. Normally a person must have served for 25 years to become eligible, but this might be shortened to 16 years for those serving in unhealthy climates abroad. There is one class: Companion. Both men and women are eligible, and recipients of this order are entitled to use the post-nominal letters 'ISO'.

== History ==
The new order was announced in the 1902 Coronation Honours list published on 26 June 1902, on the day scheduled for the coronation of King Edward VII and Queen Alexandra. The coronation was postponed due to the King's illness, however, and the statutes of the order were published on 8 August 1902, to coincide with the actual coronation on the following day. The first list of recipients was included in the Birthday Honours list published on the King′s birthday 9 November 1902.

== Insignia ==
The insignia of the order for men was an eight-pointed silver star, with the top ray obscured by a crown; the golden central medallion bore the cipher of the reigning monarch surrounded by the legend 'For Faithful Service'. This was suspended on a ribbon of crimson with a blue central stripe.

The insignia of the order for women had the same medallion as for men, surrounded by a silver laurel wreath and topped by a crown. This was suspended on a bow of crimson with a blue central stripe.

== Imperial Service Medal ==
Imperial Service Medal

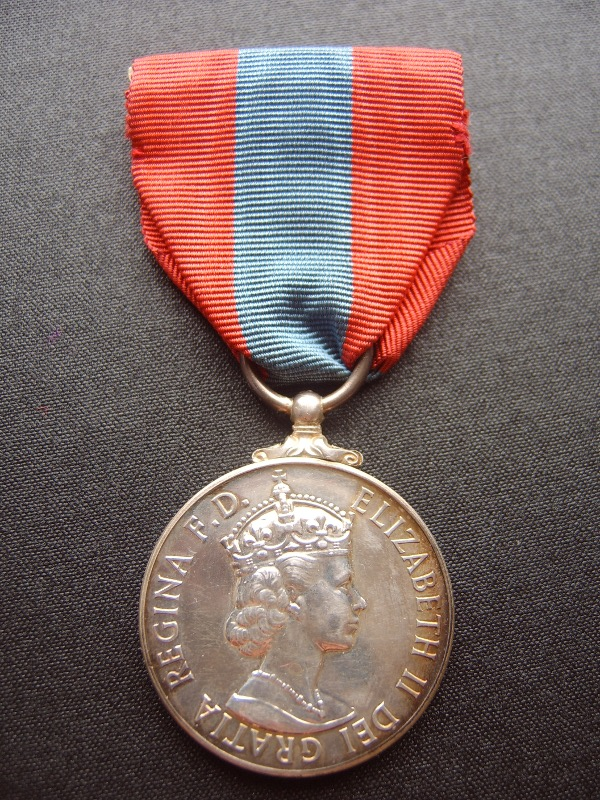
Obverse

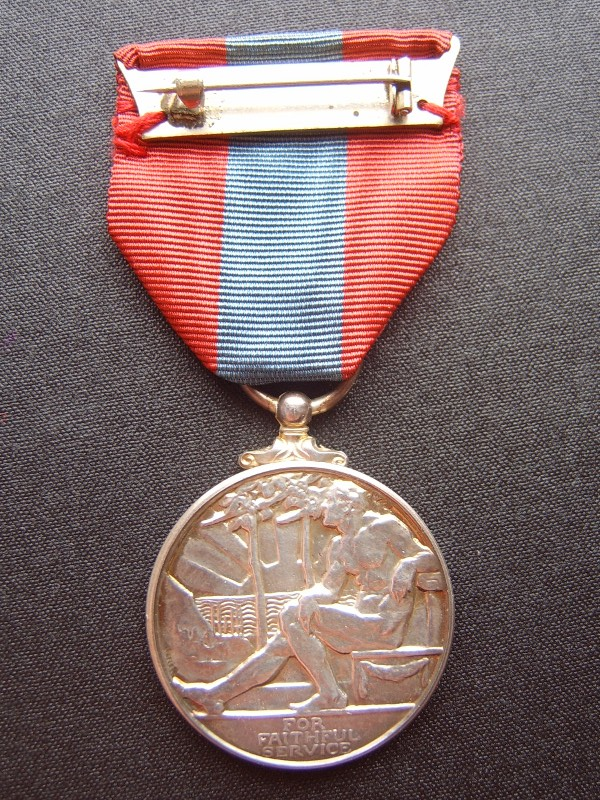
Reverse

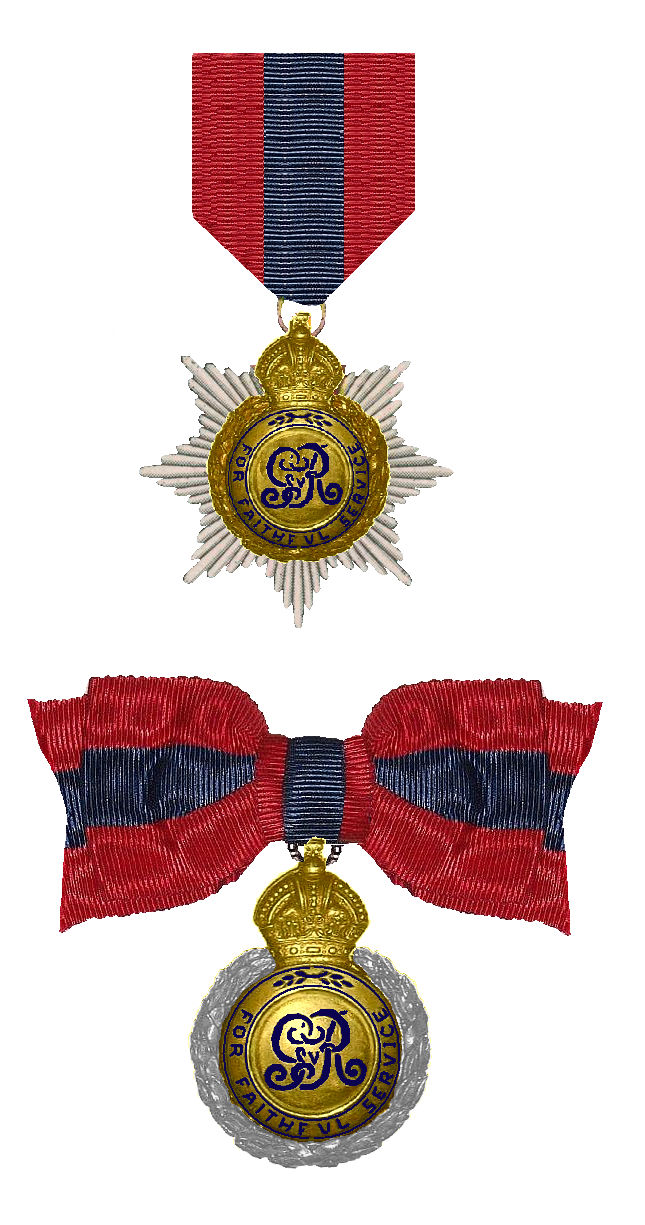
ISO as worn by gentlemen (above) and ladies (below)

Civil servants who complete 25 years' service are eligible for the Imperial Service Medal (ISM) upon retirement. The medal is a silver circular medal bearing the effigy of the reigning monarch on the obverse, and the motif of a man resting after work with the legend 'For Faithful Service' on the reverse. The ribbon or bow pattern is the same as the Imperial Service Order.

== 1993 reforms ==
During the 1993 reform of the British honours system the British Government decided to make no new appointments to the Imperial Service Order. The Imperial Service Medal, however, continues to be awarded in recognition of certain individuals who make positive contributions.

== Statutes ==
The Order is governed by statutes.

== See also ==
- Orders and decorations of the Commonwealth realms
