= Khobragade =

Khobragade is an Indian surname that may refer to

- Dadaji Ramaji Khobragade, an Indian cultivator who invented a high-yielding variety of paddy, HMT.
- B.D. Khobragade (1925–1984), Indian lawyer and politician
- Devyani Khobragade, Indian Foreign Service officer
  - Devyani Khobragade incident in 2013 related to a visa fraud
- Uttam Khobragade, Indian Administrative Service officer, father of Devyani
