= Venkatesh =

Venkatesh is a given name and family name from the Indian subcontinent derived from Venkateswara, a Hindu deity. Notable persons with the name include:

- A. Venkatesh Naik (1936–2015), Indian politician
- A. Venkatesh (director), Indian Tamil film director
- Akshay Venkatesh (born 1981), Australian mathematician
- G. K. Venkatesh (1927–1993), Indian Kannada film music composer
- Marthand K. Venkatesh, Indian film editor
- Mukta Venkatesh (1902–2003), Indian artist
- Masti Venkatesh Iyengar, Indian Kannada writer
- Poojashree Venkatesh, Indian tennis player
- Venkatesh Geriti, Indian political activist
- Pramod Venkatesh Mahajan, Indian politician
- Venkatesh Iyer, Indian cricketer
- S. P. Venkatesh, Indian composer
- Shanmugam Venkatesh (born 1977), Indian football player
- Shridhar Venkatesh B. Ketkar (1857–1930), Indian Marathi scholar and astronomer
- Sudhir Alladi Venkatesh, American sociologist and urban ethnographer
- T. G. Venkatesh, Indian businessman and politician
- Venkatesh (actor) (born 1960), aka Victory Venkatesh, Indian Telugu film actor
- Venkatesh Kabde, Indian politician
- Venkatesh Kulkarni (1945–1998), American novelist and academic
- Vyankatesh Madgulkar (1927–2001), Indian Marathi writer
- Venkatesh Prasad (born 1969), Indian cricketer
