= Ramdas Athawale =

Indian politician (born 1959)

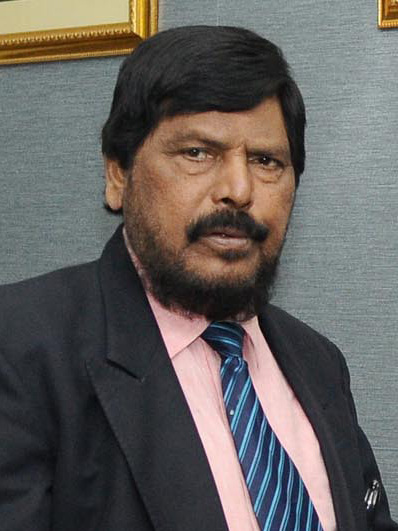
- Athawale in 2018

Union Minister of State for Social Justice and Empowerment
- Incumbent
- Assumed office 5 July 2016
- Prime Minister: Narendra Modi
- Minister: Thawar Chand Gehlot (till 2021); Virendra Kumar Khatik (from 2021)
- Preceded by: Manikrao Hodlya Gavit

Member of Parliament, Rajya Sabha
- Incumbent
- Assumed office 3 April 2014
- Chairman: Mohammad Hamid Ansari; Venkaiah Naidu; Jagdeep Dhankhar; C. P. Radhakrishnan
- Preceded by: Prakash Javadekar
- Constituency: Maharashtra

Member of Parliament, Lok Sabha
- In office 6 October 1999 – 16 May 2009
- Preceded by: Sandipan Thorat
- Succeeded by: Constituency abolished
- Constituency: Pandharpur, Maharashtra
- In office 10 March 1998 – 26 April 1999
- Preceded by: Narayan Athawale
- Succeeded by: Manohar Joshi
- Constituency: Mumbai North Central, Maharashtra

Maharashtra Minister of Social Welfare, Transport, Sports and Youth Welfare, and Employment Guarantee
- In office 1990–1995
- Chief Minister: Sharad Pawar; Sudhakarrao Naik

Member of Maharashtra Legislative Council
- In office 1990–1996

President of Republican Party of India (A)
- Incumbent
- Assumed office 25 May 1999
- Preceded by: Office established

Personal details
- Born: Ramdas Bandu Athawale; 25 December 1959 (age 66) Agalgaon, Maharashtra, India
- Party: Republican Party of India (A) (since 1990)
- Other political affiliations: National Democratic Alliance (since 2014); Republican Party of India (until 1990)
- Occupation: Trade unionist; social worker

Ramdas Bandu Athawale (Marathi pronunciation: [aːʈʰʋəle]; born 25 December 1959) is an Indian politician, social activist and trade unionist from Maharashtra. Since 1999, he is the president of the Republican Party of India (A), a splinter group of the Republican Party of India, which has its roots in the Scheduled Castes Federation led by Dr. B. R. Ambedkar. Since 2016, he has served as the Minister of State in the Ministry of Social Justice and Empowerment, Government of India and represented Maharashtra in the Rajya Sabha, the upper house of India's Parliament since 2014. Previously, he was Lok Sabha MP from Pandharpur from 1999 to 2009 and from Mumbai North Central Lok Sabha constituency from 1998 to 1999. He was also Cabinet minister of Maharashtra from 1990 to 1995 and a member of the Maharashtra Legislative Council from 1990 to 1996.

== Early life ==
Athawale was born on 25 December 1959 in Agalgaon, Sangli district, Bombay State, which is now Maharashtra, and belongs to the Mahar caste.His parents were Bandu Bapu and Honsabai Bandu Athawale. He attended Siddharth College of Law, Mumbai and married to Seema Athawale, on 16 May 1992. He has a son. Ramdas Athawale is a practitioner of Buddhism.

Athawale has been editor of a weekly magazine called Bhumika and is a founder member of Parivartan Sahitya Mahamandal. He has served as president of Parivartan Kala Mahasangha, the Dr. Babasaheb Ambedkar Foundation and the Bauddha Kalawant Academy (Buddhist Artists Academy) and was founder president of Bauddha Dhamma Parishad (Buddhism conference). He played the title role in a Marathi film, Anyayacha Pratikar, and also had a small role in another Marathi film, Joshi ki Kamble, as well as roles in Marathi dramas such as Ekach Pyala.

== Political career ==
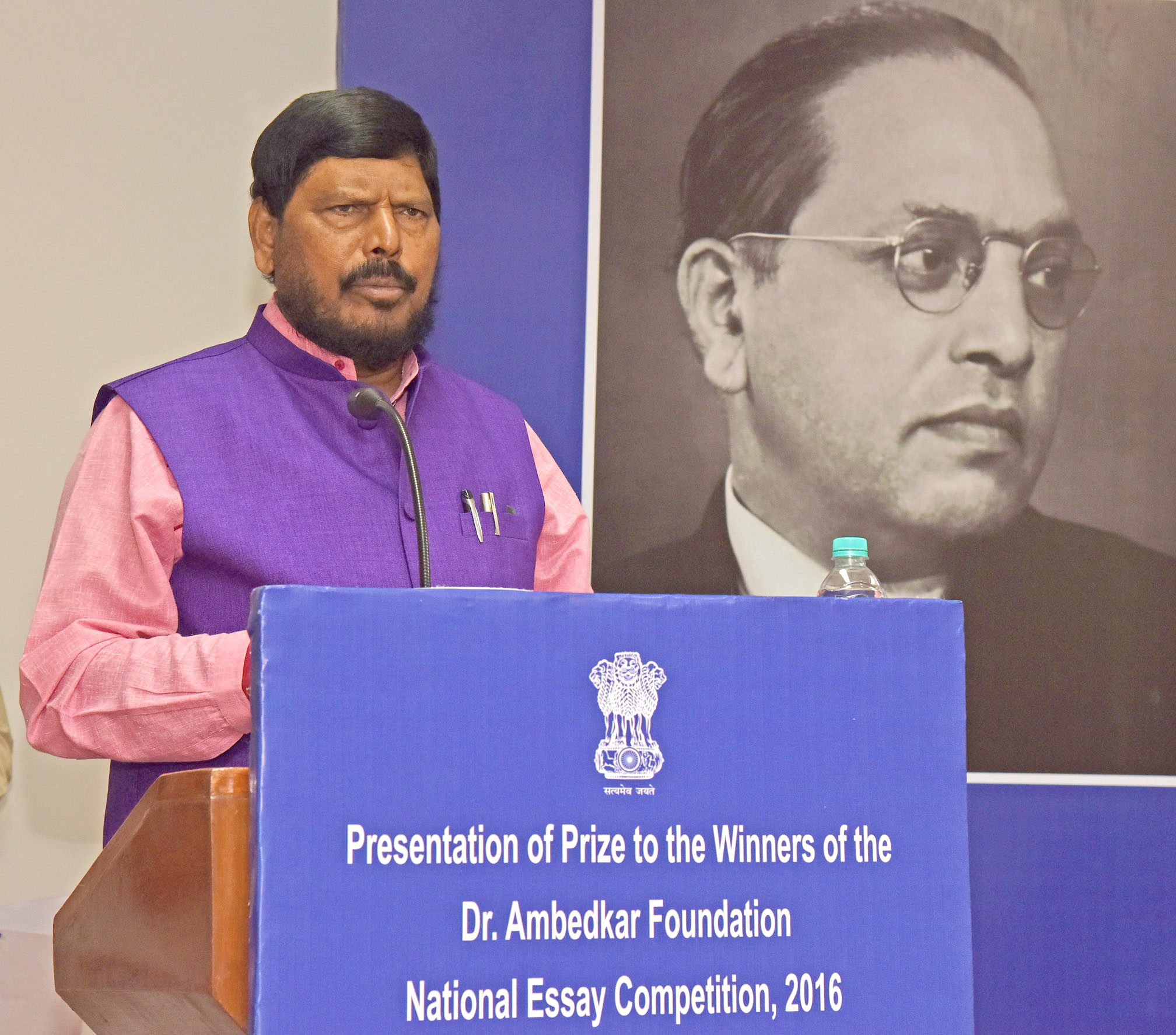
The Minister of State for Social Justice & Empowerment, Ramdas Athawale addressing at the presentation of the Essays Competition awards under Dr. Ambedkar Foundation, in New Delhi on October 11, 2017

Athwale was inspired by B. R. Ambedkar, the Indian polymath. Following a split in the Dalit Panther movement in 1974, Athawale joined Arun Kamble and Gangadhar Gade in leading a rump in Maharashtra. His involvement with a faction of the Republican Party of India, despite the Panther's general disdain for its leadership, eventually led to an association with the Indian National Congress (INC).

Athawale was member of Maharashtra Legislative Council from 1990 to 1996 and was Cabinet Minister for Social Welfare and Transport, Employment Guarantee Scheme and Prohibition Propaganda in the Government of Maharashtra between 1990 and 1995.

He represented the Pandharpur constituency of Maharashtra and is the president of the Republican Party of India (Athawale) (RPIA).

Athawale represented Mumbai North Central in the 12th Lok Sabha during 1998-99 and was elected to serve a second term in the 13th Lok Sabha of 1999–2004. A third term, in the 14th Lok Sabha, followed from 2004 to 2009. Considered something of a lightweight in state politics, he has been courted at various times by various parties because of a perception that he might assist in mobilising the scattered Maharashtrian Dalit vote in their favour. He left the Nationalist Congress Party-INC alliance in 2011 after having lost in the 2009 Lok Sabha election, when he contested the reserved Shirdi constituency. This defeat was despite a subsequent report by Social Watch which ranked him as the second-best performing member of the 14th Lok Sabha, based on an analysis of various data points. Athawale led the RPI party, joined the alliance of Shivsena and the Bharatiya Janata Party (BJP) in 2011 and contested Brihanmumbai Municipal Corporation elections together.

In 2014, Athawale was elected to the Rajya Sabha, which is the upper house of parliament. He became Minister of State in the Ministry of Social Justice and Empowerment on 6 July 2016, working under Thawar Chand Gehlot.

His RPI(A) organisation is a part of the National Democratic Alliance led by the BJP.

Devyani Khobragade was proposed for the role of Personal Secretary to Athawale in July 2016 but the appointment was refused by Gehlot, who saw a conflict of interest because her father, Uttam Khobragade, was the national executive president of the RPI(A).

When Athawale established a children's wing of the RPI(A) in September 2017, he appointed his son, then aged 12, to be its leader.

In May 2019, Athawale continued his position as Minister of State for Social Justice and Empowerment.

In March 2020, a video of Athawale chanting 'Go Corona!' at a rally went viral and became a popular meme.

During a 3-day tour of Bihar, on 29 March 2025, Athawale asserted that Prime Minister Narendra Modi will "break the record of Jawahar Lal Nehru" and retain power for the fourth consecutive term.

== Social activism ==
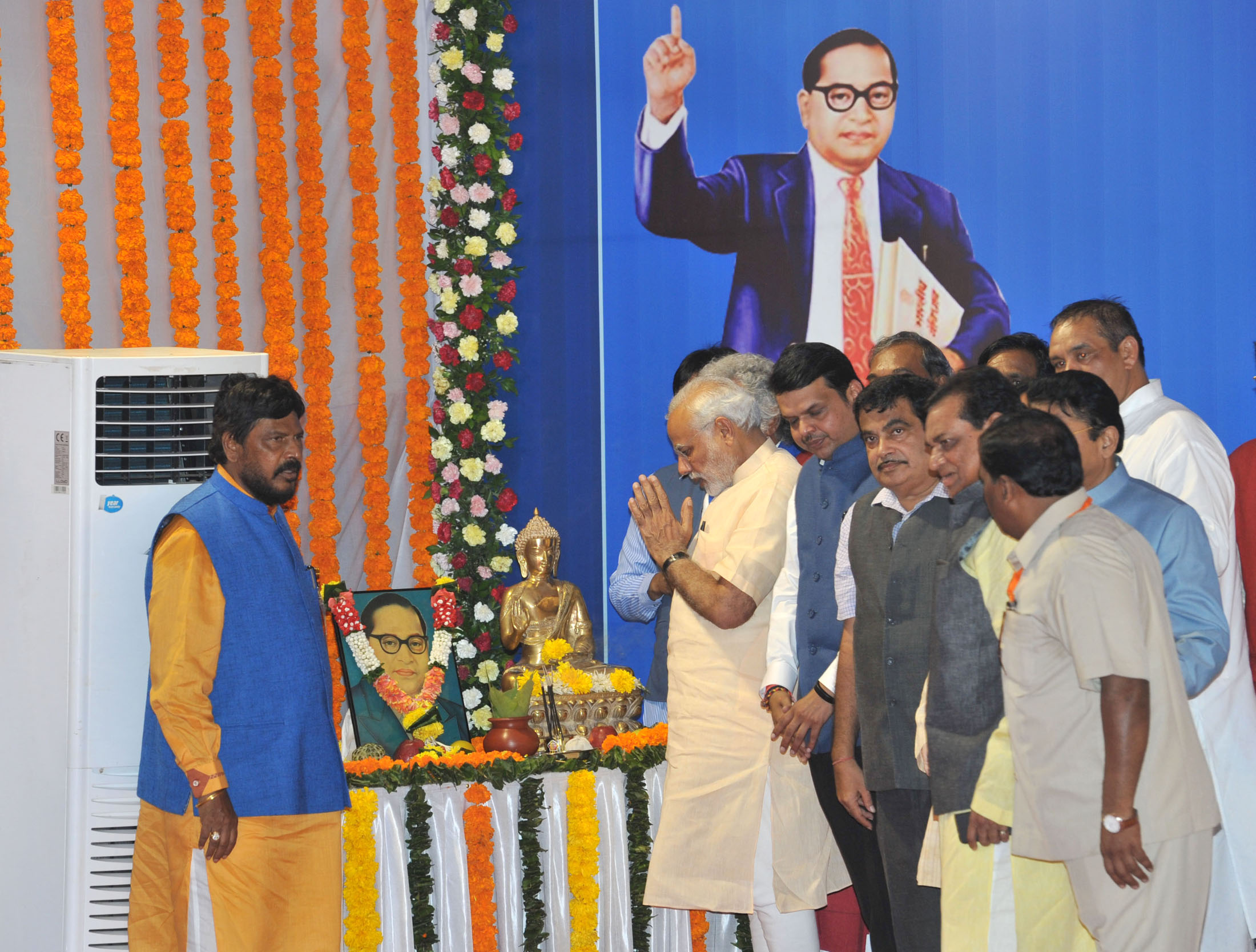
Ramdas Athawale with Narendra Modi, Nitin Gadkari and Devendra Fadnavis paying tribute to B. R. Ambedkar.

In 2015, following attacks on Dalits in the state of Haryana, Athawale said that if the police were to continue turning a blind eye to their plight then special protection squads led by senior police officers should be formed from among members of the community and they should be granted firearms licenses so that they could protect themselves. In December 2017, he suggested that Dalits should renounce Hinduism in favour of Buddhism in order to stop being subject to "atrocities". He also criticised the record of the Hindu-centric BJP and Rashtriya Swayamsevak Sangh (RSS) in dealing with issues relating to discrimination of not only Dalits but also other disadvantaged communities in India. In March 2018, echoing remarks he had made soon after becoming Minister of State in 2016 and reacting in particular to recent atrocities against Dalits in Saharanpur, Unnao and Allahabad, Athawale advocated inter-caste marriage as the best way to minimise such events and noted that he had married a Brahmin "to set an example". As he had done in December 2017, he attacked Mayawati, a Dalit former Chief Minister of Uttar Pradesh, on this occasion for what he perceived as a lack of action to help Dalits during her four terms in office. He said that this had caused the community to shift their support to the BJP and RPI, while refuting charges that he was a puppet under BJP control.

Although described as a Dalit leader, Athawale has caused controversy among Dalits. In January 2018, around 130 people were arrested when some Dalit activists protested against him during a speech.

Aside from his involvement in Dalit affairs, Athawale has also advocated reservation for economically disadvantaged upper caste communities. He has said that the government of India should release the caste-based information collected during the 2011 Census of India, which is considered to be a politically sensitive dataset, in order to address inequities in the reservation system across the board. He rejects claims that doing so would lead to an increase in casteism.

Athawale has said that reservation quota of 25 percent for Dalits should be introduced to sports, including cricket, following India's defeat in the 2017 ICC Champions Trophy Final against Pakistan, and that the armed forces should also be subject to a quota regime. He has also said that, just as the Lok Sabha has constituencies reserved for members of the Scheduled Castes and Scheduled Tribes, so too should the Rajya Sabha and the Union cabinet. In addition, he favours increasing the prevailing 50 per cent quota that exists for government jobs and places at educational institutions to 75 per cent, stressing that this would apply to all castes that are recognised as economically disadvantaged, which includes those categorised at Other Backwards Classes.

On April 28, 2025, following the Pahalgam attack and the 2025 India-Pakistan border skirmishes and diplomatic crisis, he stated that India should declare war against Pakistan if the country refuses to surrender "Pakistan-occupied Kashmir".

== Positions held ==
- 1990–96: Member, Maharashtra Legislative Council
- 1990–95: Cabinet Minister, Social Welfare and Transport, Employment Guarantee Scheme and Prohibition Propaganda, Government of Maharashtra
- 1998–99: Member, Twelfth Lok Sabha
- 1998–99: Member, Committee on Transport and Tourism Member, Consultative Committee for the Ministry of Industry
- 1999–2000: Member, Committee on Industry
- 1999–2004: Member, Thirteenth Lok Sabha (second term)
- 2002–2004: Member, Consultative Committee for the Ministry of Youth Affairs and Sports
- 2004–2009: Member, Fourteenth Lok Sabha (third term)
- 2004: Member, Committee on Transport, Tourism and Culture April
- 2014: Elected to Rajya Sabha
- Aug. 2014-past: Member, Committee on the Welfare of Scheduled Castes and Scheduled Tribes Sept.
- 2014-past: Member, Committee on Industry Nov.
- 2014-past: Member, Library Committee Freedom Fighter
- 2016–past: Minister of State for Social Justice and Empowerment, Government of India
- 2020: Reelected to Rajya Sabha unopposed.
- 2026: Reelected to Rajya Sabha unopposed.

== Election History ==
=== Rajya Sabha ===
Position	Party	Constituency	From	To	Tenure
Member of Parliament, Rajya Sabha (1st Term)	RPI(A)	Maharashtra	3 April 2014	2 April 2020	5 years, 365 days
Member of Parliament, Rajya Sabha (2nd Term)	RPI(A)	Maharashtra	3 April 2020	2 April 2026	5 years, 364 days
Member of Parliament, Rajya Sabha (3rd Term)	RPI(A)	Maharashtra	3 April 2026	2 April 2032	5 years, 365 days
