= Adarsh Housing Society scandal =

Housing allocation scheme in Mumbai

Coordinates: 18.9093°N 72.8167°E

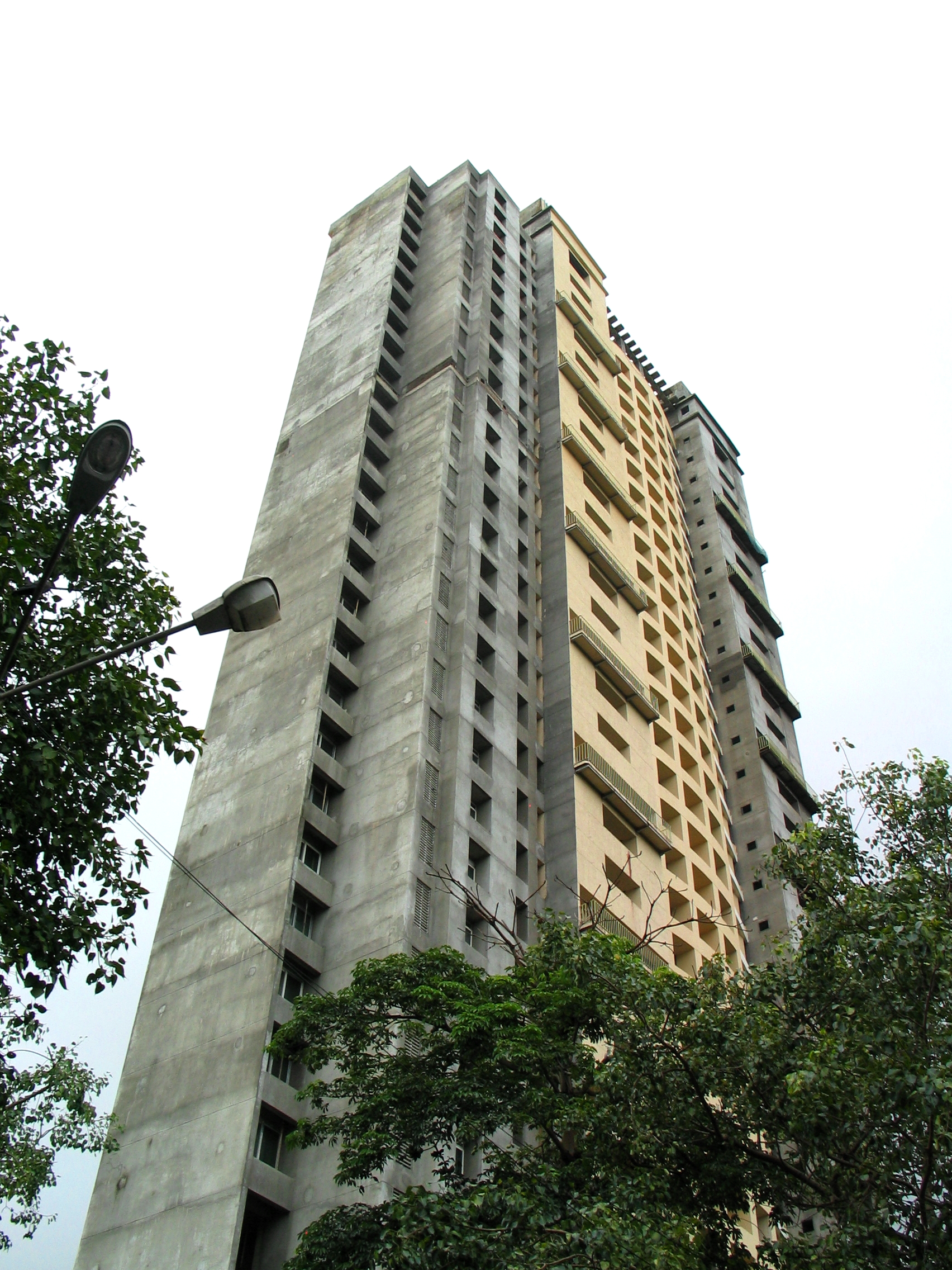
Adarsh Housing Society in July 2011.

The Adarsh Housing Society is a 31-story building constructed on prime real estate in Colaba, Bombay, for the welfare of war Widows and personnel of India's Ministry of Defence. Over a period of several years, politicians, bureaucrats and military officers allegedly conspired to bend several rules concerning land ownership, zoning, floor space index and membership getting themselves flats allotted in this cooperative society at below-market rates.

In 2011, a report of the Comptroller and Auditor General of India (CAG) said, "The episode of Adarsh co-operative Housing Society reveals how a group of select officials, placed in key posts, could subvert rules and regulations in order to grab prime government land – a public property – for personal benefit."

In January 2011, the Maharashtra government set up a two-member judicial commission to inquire into the matter. The commission was headed by retired High Court judge Justice J A Patil, with N N Kumbhar acting as member secretary. After deposing 182 witnesses over 2 years, the commission submitted its final report in April 2013 to the Maharashtra government. The report highlighted 25 illegal allotments, including 22 purchases made by proxy. The report also indicted four former chief ministers of Maharashtra: Ashok Chavan, Vilasrao Deshmukh, Sushilkumar Shinde and Shivajirao Nilangekar Patil, 2 former urban development ministers: Rajesh Tope and Sunil Tatkare and 12 top bureaucrats for various illegal acts. The allottees included Devyani Khobragade. Allegations of corruption resulted in the resignation of Chief Minister of Maharashtra, Ashok Chavan in 2012.

The Central Bureau of Investigation (CBI), the Income Tax Department and the Enforcement Directorate (ED) are currently investigating allegations that three former chief ministers of Maharashtra – Sushilkumar Shinde, Vilasrao Deshmukh and Ashok Chavan – were involved.

As of 2024, the Adarsh Society case still being heard by the courts and a final verdict has not yet been reached.

== Alleged violations ==
The Adarsh Society high-rise was constructed in the Colaba locality of Mumbai. This is considered a sensitive coastal area by the Indian Defence forces and is the location of various Indian defence establishments. The society is also alleged to have violated Indian environment ministry rules.

The issue was first raised by IBN7 News channel in 2003 as mentioned by Indian Navy in its affidavit to committee probing Adarsh Scam. Sr journalist Ravindra Ambekar expose this scam. In 2010, it was again raised by various newspapers and TV channels. Questions were raised about the manner in which apartments in the building were allocated to bureaucrats, politicians and army personnel who had nothing to do with the Kargil War and the way in which clearances were obtained for the construction of the building of the Adarsh Society. It had led to the resignation of the then Chief Minister, Ashok Chavan. Some of the current allottees of the flats in the Adarsh co-operative society building have offered to return their flats, denying allegations that they were allotted flats because they influenced or helped, in some manner, the construction of the society by violating the rules.

In an interview to The Hindu published on 26 March 2012, General VK Singh, the Chief of Army Staff ascribed many of the attempts to malign him during his tenure to, amongst others, those he described as "the Adarsh lobby", as well as those who were affected by his efforts to rid the army of corruption.

== Current state of investigation ==
Several inquiries have been ordered by the army and the Government to probe into the irregularities.

=== Bombay High Court monitoring of CBI investigation ===
There was a spate of petitions filed in Bombay High Court seeking to monitor CBI investigation. The petitions are Criminal PIL No. 34 of 2010 by former Journalist Ketan Tirodkar, Criminal Writ Petition No. 3359 of 2010 by Simpreet Singh and Criminal PIL No. 36 of 2010 by Mahendra Singh. Ref. Bombay High Court order dated 17 Feb. 2011 . By this order High Court asked CBI to amend the F.I.R. by adding Benami Properties Transaction Act section 4. Also, the High Court transferred the missing files probe from Mumbai Police to CBI. Praveen Wategaonkar filed Criminal PIL later seeking invoking of Prevention of Money Laundering Act (PMLA) into the case. So it has been invoked and Enforcement Directorate came into picture.

Reacting to these petitions and based on the slow pace of the investigation in the last two years, Bombay High Court severely castigated Enforcement Directorate for its failure to initiate any probe in the matter on 28 February 2012. Expressing its unhappiness the court observed, "It is unfortunate that ED has remained a mute spectator. There is a serious lapse on the agency's part for not probing into money laundering offence. ED has not moved an inch. It reflects a sorry state of affairs. We are summoning the director as there has been no assistance from his department to the court." The Court also rapped the CBI for the tardiness in its investigations (begun in January 2011). The High Court, again on 12 March 2012, severely castigated the CBI for not arresting any of the accused in spite of having evidence and ordered it to take action without fear or favour. ED having registered a case under Prevention of Money Laundering Act, has decided to launch attachment proceedings of the flats after going through the latest chargesheet filed by CBI. In a landmark judgement, the Bombay high court on 29 April 2016, ordered the demolition of the building.

=== Arrests ===
Following the Court's criticism, the CBI carried out eight arrests including two retired Major Generals Tej Kaul and AR Kumar, retired brigadier MM Wanchoo, former General Officer Commanding(GOC) of Maharashtra, Gujarat and Goa, Adarsh promoter Kanhaiyalal Gidwani and Pradeep Vyas, the then city collector and currently, finance secretary (expenditure) in the Govt. of Maharashtra. Accordingly, on 22 March 2012, the Chief Minister of Maharashtra, Prithviraj Chavan announced in the legislative assembly that the two IAS officers whose names have featured in the report: Pradeep Vyas and Jairaj Phatak have been suspended from government service.

According to newspaper reports, many of the arrested hold more than one flat in the society in fictitious names. Former Congress MLC Kanhaiyalal Gidwani was reported to have as many as ten flats, which he had bought on behalf of top politicians. Gidwani and his son had been earlier arrested on 6 March 2012, by the CBI for trying to influence CBI officials investigating their alleged involvement. In a further twist to the case, the CBI officers arrested their own lawyers, J K Jagiasi and Mandar Goswami. Jagiasi allegedly asked an Air India (AI) official, one of the accused in the case, to pay a bribe of Rs 5 million in exchange for diluting charges levelled against him. The petty cash books maintained by Jagiasi helped unearth the conspiracy. In addition, Rs 2.5 million was allegedly paid to Goswami. He was the Special Counsel in the Ministry of Law and Justice and at present is working as Retainer Counsel for CBI. According to CBI sources, the tainted AI official approached the CBI for dilution of the case filed against him.

Jairaj Phatak and Ramanand Tiwari were arrested by the CBI on 3 April 2012, for their alleged involvement in receiving illegal gratification in the Adarsh Housing Society.

=== Bail ===
On 29 May 2012, a special CBI court granted bail to seven of the nine arrested since the CBI failed to file a chargesheet within the stipulated 60 days from the time it took them in custody. Those granted bail include Maj. Gen. (Retired-retd) A. R. Kumar, Maj. Gen. (retd) T. K. Kaul, Brig. (retd) M. M. Wanchu, IAS officer and former Mumbai district collector Pradeep Vyas, former Defence Estate officer R. C. Thakur, IAS officer P. V. Deshmukh and former Congress member of the Legislative Council Kanhaiyalal Gidwani (the chief promoter of Adarsh). The bail was set at ₹500,000 rupees (US$7,700). They have been directed to attend the CBI office every Tuesday and Thursday between 10 am and 12 pm. The court also told the accused to deposit their passports and not tamper with evidence. Aniket Nikam will represent the Ministry of Defence before the commission set up to investigate the Adarsh Housing Society scandal.

=== Role of Maharashtra Governor K Sankaranarayanan ===
In spite of CBI having a strong 'quid pro quo' case against ex Maharashtra CM Ashok Chavan, Maharashtra Governor K. Sankaranarayanan refused to grant permission to prosecute Chavan.

Case Time Lines

Jan 2014: Sessions court refuses to delete Ashok Chavan's name as accused in the case on request made by CBI.

Mar 2015: Bombay High Court also dismisses Ashok Chavan's petition seeking deletion of his name from the case.

Oct 2015: CBI submits fresh evidence to Maharashtra Governor Ch Vidyasagar Rao seeking sanction once again.

Feb 2016: Governor Rao grants the CBI permission to prosecute Ashok Chavan. Chavan approaches HC challenging Governor's order.

Dec 22, 2017: HC allows Chavan’s petition and quashes and sets aside Governor’s order granting sanction to prosecute him.

== Inquiry by a Judicial Commission ==
On 9 January 2011, Government of Maharashtra appointed a two-member judicial commission, under the Commissions of Inquiry Act, 1952, to investigate alleged irregularities and corruption. It was decided that the commission would be led by a retired Bombay High Court judge JA Patil while former State Chief Secretary P Subramanian would be the member.

The Commission's terms of reference were to investigate all aspects, including land ownership and allotment, permissions given to Adarsh. The Commission was given three months' time to complete the investigation.

On 27 June 2012, while deposing before the two-member panel probing the affair, Vilasrao Deshmukh, Union Minister and former chief minister of Maharashtra contended that land was allotted to the housing society after getting clearance from the Revenue Department, passing the buck to his successor, Ashok Chavan who headed the department then.

=== Report and role of Maharashtra state cabinet led by Prithviraj Chavan ===
Adarsh not a saga of ideal cooperation but a shameless tale of blatant violations of statutory provisions, rules and regulations. It reflects greed, nepotism and favoritism on the part of some people.

— Justice JA Patil and P Subramanian Commission report

In April 2013, the commission submitted its final report to the Government of Maharashtra but it refused to table it in the assembly. The Government of Maharashtra deliberately adopted delay tactics and it was only after queries from the Bombay High Court that the Government tabled the report purposely on the very last day of Assembly's Winter Session in December 2013 so that the Adarsh report cannot be discussed in the Winter session of 2013. The report that was tabled was conveniently rejected by the Maharashtra Cabinet led by Prithviraj Chavan.

The report indicted 4 former chief ministers: Ashok Chavan, Vilasrao Deshmukh, Sushilkumar Shinde and Shivajirao Nilangekar Patil, 2 former urban development ministers: Rajesh Tope and Sunil Tatkare and 12 top bureaucrats. The report said Ashok Chavan and other bureaucrats gave permissions and clearances in exchange for flats. It found 25 of the society's 102 members ineligible. The report also said Adarsh enjoyed the "political patronage" of Late Vilasrao Deshmukh, Sushil Kumar Shinde, Chavan, Sunil Tatkare and Rajesh Tope. The report revealed that 22 benami transactions took place and that the Adarsh society never sought any environmental clearances. The report mentioned that Devyani Khobragade (who was in the news for a visa fraud allegation by United States Government around the same time the report was released), was an illegal beneficiary of a flat allotted to her.

After Rahul Gandhi and Sonia Gandhi publicly disapproved of Maharashtra cabinet's decision to reject judicial report, Prithviraj Chavan convened a cabinet meet to review the decision. The report was partially accepted by the state cabinet. It was decided that the 12 officials named in the report will face departmental inquiry for violating the service conduct rules but appeared going soft on politicians named by the commission for political patronage. The cabinet has also decided to initiate proceedings against 22 benami transactions, adding the commission had recommended action against allottees of such flats as they were found to be in violation of the Benami Transactions Prohibition Act.

== CBI special court rejects CBI plea ==
K. Sankaranarayanan, Governor of Maharashtra (2010-2014) in 2013 rejected the proposal of Central Bureau of Investigations to grant sanction to prosecute former Chief Minister Ashok Chavan for having favoured Adarsh Society by way of allotment of additional Floor Space Index illegally. It is stated in the C.B.I. proposal that Mr. Chavan grabbed two apartments in the to be decided tainted society for these illegal decisions.

Acitivist Ketan Tirodkar moved Bombay High Court seeking direction to C.B.I. to proceed against Ashok Chavan without sanction on the basis of Supreme Court Judgement stating that sanction to prosecute is not required in cases that are monitored by Court.[Application 27 of 2013 in Cr.PIL 34 of 2010]. The application states that Governor Mr. Sankarnarayan was Union Minister with father of Ashok Chavan and Ashok met governor on later's birth-day 15 October; 2013; at Raj Bhavan; official residence of the Governor. This meet lasted for an hour; as stated in the application after which Governor rejected the CBI plea of sanction. The application in High Court seeks direction to CBI to proceed with prosecution of Ashok Chavan & Governor.

The CBI decided not to challenge the Governor's decision stating that all the available evidence of Mr Chavan's involvement had been placed before him and that they would only do so if new evidence emerged. However the special court rejected the CBI's plea to drop his name from the list of accused in the Adarsh case. Special CBI court observed even though governor K Sankaranarayanan had rejected CBI's plea for sanction to prosecute Chavan, he could still be tried under the Prevention of Corruption act as he has been accused of criminal misconduct. Special CBI Public Prosecutor Bharat Badami himself admitted in the court that the CBI would be "very happy" to prosecute the former chief minister but "our hands are tied". Another Public Interest Litigation has been moved by activist Ketan Tirodkar seeking to prosecute State Cabinet for having rejected Judicial Commission findings pertaining to Adarsh housing affair..

== Other Issues ==
Adarsh Housing Society has defended its actions as similar to other housing societies such as Samata, Nyay Sagar & likes in which "serving and retired judges already owned homes in Mumbai but transferred these in names of their children to become eligible for apartments in Samata & Nyay Sagar." Also, Nyay Sagar Society is constructed upon a plot of land reserved for Housing the War Disabled.

== Events since 2014 ==
In 2014, when the BJP led NDA formed the government of Maharashtra, the case against Ashok Chavan was reopened. However, Chavan appealed and the Bombay High court rejected the reopening of the case. In 2016, the same court ordered the building to be demolished holding that it was illegally constructed. However, the society appealed to the Supreme court of India which in 2018 ordered a stay on the demolition. On the orders of the Supreme Court, the Indian army has secured the building pending further appeals.

== See also ==
- Aiyaary, a film directed by Neeraj Pandey based on the affair.
- Central Bureau of Investigation
- Enforcement Directorate
- Encyclopedia for Co-operative Housing Society
