= Bapusaheb Gorthekar =

Indian politician

Bapusaheb Gorthekar Deshmukh
- श्रीनिवास उर्फ बापूसाहेब गोरठेकर

Member of Maharashtra Legislative Assembly
- In office 2004–2009
- Preceded by: Balajirao Gopalrao Gorthekar Deshmukh
- Succeeded by: Ashok Chavan
- Constituency: Bhokar

Personal details
- Born: At.Gortha, Tq.Umri, Nanded
- Party: Bhartiya Janata Party (2019-2020)
- Other political affiliations: Nationalist Congress Party (till 2019)
- Spouse: 2
- Children: Shirish, Kailas.
- Parent: Babasaheb Gorthekar Deshmukh (father)
- Education: SSC
- Nickname: Bapu

Shrinivas Sawant Deshmukh alias Bapusaheb Babasaheb Gorthekar Deshmukh is a politician and a former Nanded District President of the Nationalist Congress Party, and son of Balajirao Gopalrao Gorthekar Deshmukh. He was a Member of the Maharashtra Legislative Assembly from the Bhokar constituency.

He Contested an Assembly election against Ashok Chavan in 2019 from Bhokar as BJP Candidate.
