= Madhavrao Bhujangrao Kinhalkar =

Indian politician (born 1957)

Dr. Madhavrao Kinhalkar
- डॉ. माधवराव किन्हाळकर

Member of the Maharashtra Legislative Assembly for Bhokar
- In office 1990–1999
- Preceded by: Shankarrao Chavan
- Succeeded by: Babasaheb Deshmukh

Personal details
- Born: Madhav Bhujangrao Kinhalkar; 27 September 1957 (age 69) Bhokar, Nanded district
- Citizenship: Indian
- Party: Nationalist Congress Party – Sharadchandra Pawar (2024-Present)
- Other political affiliations: Bharatiya Janata Party (2014-2024); Nationalist Congress Party (1999-2014); Indian National Congress (Before 1999)
- Spouse: Vrushali Kinhalkar
- Relations: Married
- Children: Only Daughter
- Education: Swami Ramanand Teerth Rural Medical College
- Profession: Doctor, Politician
- Known for: Author, Babli project
- Website: http://facebook.com/BallalkarMaruthiRao

Madhavrao Kinhalkar is a former Minister in Sharad Pawar Government. He is a member of the Bharatiya Janata Party after resignation from NCP.

== Career ==
He served as a Congress Member of the Legislative Assembly of Bhokar Constituency from 1991 through 1999. He served as Minister of State for Home Affairs, Revenue and Co-operation in the Maharashtra government from 1991 to 1995 headed by Sharad Pawar.

He was a Nationalist Congress Party leader, but in 2014 he joined the Bharatiya Janata Party at Mumbai.

In 2014, he contested from Bhokar (Vidhan Sabha constituency) as BJP Candidate against Ameeta Ashokrao Chavan unsuccessfully with securing 53,224 votes as running candidates.

== Litigation surrounding paid news ==
Kinhalkar is the main litigant in the Ashok Chavan Paid News case of 2009 Maharashtra Vidhan Sabha. He Independently contested against him in the 2009 assembly poll from Bhokar Assembly Constituency.
