= Bhokar Assembly constituency =

Constituency of the Maharashtra legislative assembly in India

Bhokar
- Constituency No. 85 for the Maharashtra Legislative Assembly

Constituency details
- Country: India
- Region: Western India
- State: Maharashtra
- District: Nanded
- Lok Sabha constituency: Nanded
- Established: 1951
- Total electors: 303,352
- Reservation: None

Member of Legislative Assembly
- 15th Maharashtra Legislative Assembly
- Incumbent Sreejaya Chavan
- Party: Bhartiya Janta Party
- Elected year: 2024

Bhokar Assembly constituency is one of the 288 Vidhan Sabha (legislative assembly) constituencies of Maharashtra state in Western India. This constituency is located in Nanded district.

== Members of Legislative Assembly ==
Year	Member	Party
1952	Digambarrao Govindrao Bindu	Indian National Congress
1967	Shankarrao Chavan	Indian National Congress
1972	Shankarrao Chavan	Indian National Congress
1978	Shankarrao Chavan	Independent
1980	Babasaheb Gorthekar Deshmukh	Indian National Congress
1985	Babasaheb Gorthekar Deshmukh	Indian National Congress
1990	Dr. Madhavrao Kinhalkar	Indian National Congress
1995	Dr. Madhavrao Kinhalkar	Indian National Congress
1999	Babasaheb Gorthekar Deshmukh	Independent
2004	Bapusaheb Babasaheb Gorthekar Deshmukh	Nationalist Congress Party
2009	Ashok Chavan	Indian National Congress
2014	Ameeta Chavan	Indian National Congress
2019	Ashok Chavan	Indian National Congress
2024	Sreejaya Chavan	Bharatiya Janata Party

== Election results ==
=== Assembly Election 2024 ===
2024 Maharashtra Legislative Assembly election : Bhokar
Party	Candidate	Votes	%	±%
BJP	Sreejaya Chavan	133,187	57.15	▲36.23
INC	Tirupati Baburao Kadam Kondhekar	82,636	35.46	▼32.74
VBA	Suresh Tikaram Rathod	8,872	3.81	▼4.83
BSP	Kamlesh Choudante	1,664	0.71	▲0.11
NOTA	None of the above	284	0.12	▼0.51
Margin of victory		50,551	21.69	▼25.59
Turnout		233,349	76.92	▲2.59
Total valid votes		233,065		
Registered electors		303,352		▲8.73
BJP gain from INC		Swing	▼11.05	

=== Assembly Election 2019 ===
2019 Maharashtra Legislative Assembly election : Bhokar
Party	Candidate	Votes	%	±%
INC	Ashok Chavan	140,559	68.20	▲13.36
BJP	Bapusaheb Gorthekar	43,114	20.92	▼8.04
VBA	Ayalwad Namdev Nagorao	17,813	8.64	New
SBP	Bhagwan Bhimrao Kadam	2,069	1.00	New
NOTA	None of the above	1,297	0.63	▼0.11
BSP	Ratnakar S/o Shamrao Taru	1,240	0.60	▼1.74
Margin of victory		97,445	47.28	▲21.40
Turnout		207,385	74.33	▲3.86
Total valid votes		206,085		
Registered electors		279,004		▲5.88
INC hold		Swing	▲13.36	

=== Assembly Election 2014 ===
2014 Maharashtra Legislative Assembly election : Bhokar
Party	Candidate	Votes	%	±%
INC	Ameeta Ashokrao Chavan	100,781	54.84	▼24.81
BJP	Dr. Madhavrao Bhujangrao Kinhalkar	53,224	28.96	New
SS	Baban Alias (Khobaji) Ramrao Barse	12,760	6.94	▲2.72
NCP	Dharmraj Ganpatrao Deshmukh	7,809	4.25	New
BSP	Dr. Shyam Pawar	4,299	2.34	▼1.80
Republican Sena	Adv. Siddharth Chandrakant Kadam	2,107	1.15	New
NOTA	None of the above	1,368	0.74	New
WPOI	Sayyad Yusuf Sayyad Murtuza	1,343	0.73	New
Margin of victory		47,557	25.88	▼44.97
Turnout		185,711	70.47	▲1.31
Total valid votes		183,782		
Registered electors		263,518		▲20.07
INC hold		Swing	▼24.81	

=== Assembly Election 2009 ===
2009 Maharashtra Legislative Assembly election : Bhokar
Party	Candidate	Votes	%	±%
INC	Ashok Chavan	120,849	79.65	New
Independent	Dr. Madhavrao Bhujangrao Kinhalkar	13,346	8.80	New
SS	Kshirsagar Bhimrao Mariba	6,405	4.22	▼27.64
BSP	Gajbhare Bapurao	6,279	4.14	▲1.88
Independent	Kshirsagar Balaji Digambar	1,490	0.98	New
SBP	Hulgunde Kishanrao Vithoba	1,433	0.94	New
Margin of victory		107,503	70.85	▲66.10
Turnout		151,782	69.16	▼5.18
Total valid votes		151,724		
Registered electors		219,464		▲15.51
INC gain from NCP		Swing	▲43.04	

=== Assembly Election 2004 ===
2004 Maharashtra Legislative Assembly election : Bhokar
Party	Candidate	Votes	%	±%
NCP	Bapusaheb Babasaheb Gorthekar Deshmukh	51,694	36.61	▲15.30
SS	Naganath Lakshman Ghisewad	44,992	31.86	▲20.69
Independent	Dr. Madhavrao Bhujangrao Kinhalkar	28,610	20.26	New
BBM	Raja Khanderao	7,295	5.17	▼26.36
BSP	Pawar Rajaram Hobaji	3,188	2.26	New
Independent	Prop. Madhukar Gangaram Dhuture	2,789	1.98	New
Independent	Jadhav Sainath Datta	1,403	0.99	New
Independent	Doiwad Vyankatrao Govindrao	1,232	0.87	New
Margin of victory		6,702	4.75	▲2.21
Turnout		141,235	74.34	▲3.27
Total valid votes		141,203		
Registered electors		189,990		▲19.49
NCP gain from Independent		Swing	▲2.54	

=== Assembly Election 1999 ===
1999 Maharashtra Legislative Assembly election : Bhokar
Party	Candidate	Votes	%	±%
Independent	Babasaheb Gorthekar Deshmukh	35,411	34.07	New
BBM	Ghisewad Naganath Lakshman	32,773	31.53	New
NCP	Dr. Madhavrao Bhujangrao Kinhalkar	22,147	21.31	New
SS	Manurkar Bhagwan Shankar	11,607	11.17	▼1.20
ABS	Jadhav Sattya Narayan Ramu	1,992	1.92	New
Margin of victory		2,638	2.54	▲1.14
Turnout		112,996	71.07	▼12.10
Total valid votes		103,930		
Registered electors		159,002		▲1.81
Independent gain from INC		Swing	▲5.41	

=== Assembly Election 1995 ===
1995 Maharashtra Legislative Assembly election : Bhokar
Party	Candidate	Votes	%	±%
INC	Dr. Madhavrao Bhujangrao Kinhalkar	36,183	28.66	▲4.83
Independent	Babasaheb Gorthekar Deshmukh	34,411	27.26	New
BBM	Ghisewad Naganath Lakshman	16,468	13.04	New
SS	Sanjaykumar Dattatry Kulkarni	15,622	12.37	▼8.86
Independent	Solunke Hanmantrao Tripatrao	12,231	9.69	New
JD	Jadhav Uttamrao Lachchma	6,467	5.12	▼1.26
Independent	Gaikwad Kishan Satwaji	1,810	1.43	New
Independent	Rathod Ramdhan Alu	1,069	0.85	New
Margin of victory		1,772	1.40	▼0.75
Turnout		129,897	83.17	▲17.10
Total valid votes		126,247		
Registered electors		156,177		▲5.14
INC hold		Swing	▲4.83	

=== Assembly Election 1990 ===
1990 Maharashtra Legislative Assembly election : Bhokar
Party	Candidate	Votes	%	±%
INC	Dr. Madhavrao Bhujangrao Kinhalkar	22,838	23.83	▼21.41
Independent	Kesrale Kishor Bhujangrao	20,774	21.67	New
SS	Uttam Lachma Jadhav	20,351	21.23	New
Independent	Kalyankar Venkatrao Bapurao	10,475	10.93	New
BSP	Yerawad Dattatrayrao Rajaram	7,317	7.63	New
JD	Puyed Balaji Ganpati	6,119	6.38	New
Independent	Manoorkar Ganpat Piraji	3,267	3.41	New
Independent	Battewad Sitaram Dyanoba	2,249	2.35	New
Margin of victory		2,064	2.15	▼1.28
Turnout		98,131	66.07	▲4.85
Total valid votes		95,847		
Registered electors		148,536		▲29.60
INC hold		Swing	▼21.41	

=== Assembly Election 1985 ===
1985 Maharashtra Legislative Assembly election : Bhokar
Party	Candidate	Votes	%	±%
INC	Babasaheb Gorthekar Deshmukh	30,912	45.24	New
IC(S)	Dr. Madhavrao Bhujangrao Kinhalkar	28,569	41.81	New
CPI	Karkhelikar Venkat Sayanna	7,792	11.40	New
Independent	Motilal Bhoju	418	0.61	New
Margin of victory		2,343	3.43	▼66.83
Turnout		70,168	61.22	▲9.73
Total valid votes		68,333		
Registered electors		114,609		▲5.51
INC gain from INC(I)		Swing	▼38.71	

=== Assembly Election 1980 ===
1980 Maharashtra Legislative Assembly election : Bhokar
Party	Candidate	Votes	%	±%
INC(I)	Babasaheb Gorthekar Deshmukh	45,582	83.95	New
JP	Mundada Chandulal Bajranglal	7,431	13.69	New
Independent	Chalikwar Manohar Babarao	1,283	2.36	New
Margin of victory		38,151	70.26	▲53.89
Turnout		55,928	51.49	▼19.82
Total valid votes		54,296		
Registered electors		108,622		▲7.85
INC(I) gain from Independent		Swing	▲33.18	

=== Assembly Election 1978 ===
1978 Maharashtra Legislative Assembly election : Bhokar
Party	Candidate	Votes	%	±%
Independent	Shankarrao Chavan	34,896	50.77	New
INC	Babasaheb Gorthekar Deshmukh	23,645	34.40	▼38.01
CPI	Karkhalikar Venkatarao Sayanna	7,042	10.25	▲7.54
Independent	Digambararao Bapurao Dhanorkar	1,531	2.23	New
Independent	M. Assadulla M. Ubedulla	876	1.27	New
Margin of victory		11,251	16.37	▼35.22
Turnout		71,818	71.31	▲2.31
Total valid votes		68,727		
Registered electors		100,713		▲4.72
Independent gain from INC		Swing	▼21.64	

=== Assembly Election 1972 ===
1972 Maharashtra Legislative Assembly election : Bhokar
Party	Candidate	Votes	%	±%
INC	Shankarrao Chavan	45,803	72.41	▲4.06
RPI	Atnod. T. D	13,171	20.82	▼10.83
CPI	K. V. Sayamna	1,714	2.71	New
Independent	Baburao Fakirappa	1,471	2.33	New
ABJS	Belurkar B. Natupaoo	1,094	1.73	New
Margin of victory		32,632	51.59	▲14.90
Turnout		66,362	69.00	▲7.63
Total valid votes		63,253		
Registered electors		96,174		▲14.91
INC hold		Swing	▲4.06	

=== Assembly Election 1967 ===
1967 Maharashtra Legislative Assembly election : Bhokar
Party	Candidate	Votes	%	±%
INC	Shankarrao Chavan	32,910	68.35	▲28.13
RPI	N. S. Vibhute	15,241	31.65	New
Margin of victory		17,669	36.69	▲21.58
Turnout		51,361	61.37	▲26.34
Total valid votes		48,151		
Registered electors		83,692		▲81.06
INC hold		Swing	▲28.13	

=== Assembly Election 1952 ===
1952 Hyderabad State Legislative Assembly election : Bhokar
Party	Candidate	Votes	%	±%
INC	Digamber Rao Bindu	6,512	40.22	New
PDF	Pundalik Rao	4,066	25.11	New
Independent	Rangrao Saheb	3,989	24.64	New
RRP	Balwant Rao	1,625	10.04	New
Margin of victory		2,446	15.11	
Turnout		16,192	35.03	
Total valid votes		16,192		
Registered electors		46,223		
INC win (new seat)				

== See also ==
- Bhokar
- List of constituencies of Maharashtra Vidhan Sabha

== Notes ==
19.2208604°N 77.6683612°E
