= Mudkhed Assembly constituency =

Constituency of the Maharashtra legislative assembly in India

Coordinates: 19.15°N 77.50°E

Mudkhed
- Former constituency for the Maharashtra Legislative Assembly

Constituency details
- Country: India
- Region: Western India
- State: Maharashtra
- District: Nanded
- Established: 1978
- Abolished: 2008

Mudkhed was one of the 288 Vidhan Sabha (legislative assembly) constituencies of Maharashtra state, western India. This constituency was located in Nanded district. This constituency was abolished during delimitation of the constituencies that happened in 2008.

== Representatives ==
Year	Member	Party
1978	Chandrakant Maski	Janata Party
1980	Sahebrao Baradkar Deshmukh	Indian National Congress
1985	Sahebrao Baradkar Deshmukh	Indian National Congress
1990	Sahebrao Baradkar Deshmukh	Indian National Congress
1995	Sahebrao Baradkar Deshmukh	Indian National Congress
1999	Ashok Chavan	Indian National Congress
2004	Ashok Chavan	Indian National Congress

== Election results ==
=== Assembly Election 2004 ===
2004 Maharashtra Legislative Assembly election : Mudkhed
Party	Candidate	Votes	%	±%
INC	Ashokrao Shankarrao Chavan	105,932	62.15%	▲3.12
Independent	Gangadharrao Deshmukh Kunturkar	35,478	20.81%	New
SBP	Dr. Shobhatai (Vrushali) Waghmare	10,513	6.17%	▼17.53
BBM	Govande Bhaskar Kakanaji	7,561	4.44%	New
BSP	Suryatale Balaji Namdev	4,913	2.88%	New
Independent	Waghmare Ramesh Ramchandra	2,420	1.42%	New
Margin of victory		70,454	41.33%	▲6.01
Turnout		1,70,479	73.31%	▲5.52
Total valid votes		1,70,459		
Registered electors		2,32,530		▲28.02
INC hold		Swing	▲3.12	

=== Assembly Election 1999 ===
1999 Maharashtra Legislative Assembly election : Mudkhed
Party	Candidate	Votes	%	±%
INC	Ashokrao Shankarrao Chavan	67,727	59.02%	▲33.42
SBP	Manikrao Rajegore	27,193	23.70%	New
SS	Patil Hemlata Narendra	15,642	13.63%	▲0.71
Independent	Gawli Murlidhar Vishwanath	2,234	1.95%	New
Independent	Dhole Digamber Munjaji	1,153	1.00%	New
Margin of victory		40,534	35.32%	▲34.98
Turnout		1,23,133	67.79%	▼6.78
Total valid votes		1,14,748		
Registered electors		1,81,639		▲2.63
INC hold		Swing	▲33.42	

=== Assembly Election 1995 ===
1995 Maharashtra Legislative Assembly election : Mudkhed
Party	Candidate	Votes	%	±%
INC	Sahebrao Baradkar Deshmukh	33,781	25.60%	▼3.80
Independent	Rajegore Manikrao Laxmanrao	33,330	25.26%	New
SS	Rathod Krishna Bajrang	17,049	12.92%	New
BSP	More Digambar Sambhaji	13,863	10.50%	New
Independent	Ram Choudhary	13,823	10.47%	New
Independent	Deshmukh Shankarrao Rajaramji	10,751	8.15%	New
JD	More Balwantrao Kishanrao	2,651	2.01%	▼16.77
Margin of victory		451	0.34%	▼6.82
Turnout		1,36,204	76.96%	▲8.35
Total valid votes		1,31,967		
Registered electors		1,76,979		▲9.70
INC hold		Swing	▼3.80	

=== Assembly Election 1990 ===
1990 Maharashtra Legislative Assembly election : Mudkhed
Party	Candidate	Votes	%	±%
INC	Sahebrao Baradkar Deshmukh	31,403	29.40%	▼32.78
BJP	Choudhary Ramrao Laxmikantrao	23,757	22.24%	▼0.19
Independent	Umrekar Sambhaji Ramji Patil	23,076	21.60%	New
JD	Rajegore Manikrao Laxmanrao	20,061	18.78%	New
Independent	Kaxi Salauddin Jalaloddin	2,856	2.67%	New
Independent	Kadam Ssahebrao Pundalikrao	2,046	1.92%	New
Independent	Yamalwad Maloji Ramji	1,284	1.20%	New
Margin of victory		7,646	7.16%	▼32.60
Turnout		1,09,546	67.90%	▲14.89
Total valid votes		1,06,821		
Registered electors		1,61,332		▲26.64
INC hold		Swing	▼32.78	

=== Assembly Election 1985 ===
1985 Maharashtra Legislative Assembly election : Mudkhed
Party	Candidate	Votes	%	±%
INC	Sahebrao Baradkar Deshmukh	40,658	62.18%	New
BJP	Chandrakant Govindrao Maski	14,664	22.43%	▼7.18
Independent	Kamble Bhagwan Vithal	8,073	12.35%	New
Independent	Gadhe Sambhaji Wamanrao	808	1.24%	New
Independent	Khule Sheshrao Ramji	773	1.18%	New
Independent	Kolhe Ramaji Sakharam	410	0.63%	New
Margin of victory		25,994	39.75%	▲7.62
Turnout		66,883	52.50%	▲3.61
Total valid votes		65,386		
Registered electors		1,27,395		▲8.20
INC gain from INC(I)		Swing	▲0.45	

=== Assembly Election 1980 ===
1980 Maharashtra Legislative Assembly election : Mudkhed
Party	Candidate	Votes	%	±%
INC(I)	Sahebrao Baradkar Deshmukh	34,680	61.73%	New
BJP	Chandrakant Govindrao Maski	16,630	29.60%	New
RPI(K)	Pandit Bhimmrao Sharao	4,867	8.66%	New
Margin of victory		18,050	32.13%	▲16.74
Turnout		57,840	49.13%	▼12.68
Total valid votes		56,177		
Registered electors		1,17,740		▲8.52
INC(I) gain from JP		Swing	▲22.71	

=== Assembly Election 1978 ===
1978 Maharashtra Legislative Assembly election : Mudkhed
Party	Candidate	Votes	%	±%
JP	Chandrakant Govindrao Maski	25,568	39.02%	New
Independent	Sirsat Sambhajirao Ramji	15,481	23.63%	New
INC	Jadhav Vithalrao Madhavrao	13,714	20.93%	New
Independent	Lone Niwarati Gyanoji	7,258	11.08%	New
Independent	Deshmukh Manikrao Madhavrao	2,175	3.32%	New
Independent	Kamble Tulsiram Ranba	693	1.06%	New
Independent	Unhale Pandurang Narsingrao	634	0.97%	New
Margin of victory		10,087	15.39%	
Turnout		68,364	63.01%	
Total valid votes		65,523		
Registered electors		1,08,492		
JP win (new seat)				
