= Sahebrao Baradkar Deshmukh =

Indian politician

- साहेबराव बारडकर देशमुख

Member of Maharashtra Legislative Assembly
- In office 1980–1999
- Preceded by: Chandrakant Maski
- Succeeded by: Ashok Chavan
- Constituency: Mudkhed

Personal details
- Party: Indian National Congress
- Parent: Sakhojirao Deshmukh (father)

Sahebrao Sakhojirao Deshmukh was a politician and a member of the Indian National Congress, and son of Sakhojirao Baradkar Deshmukh. He was a four term Member of the Maharashtra Legislative Assembly from the Mudkhed constituency.

He was born in Barad.
