= T. H. Sonawane =

Indian politician (1910–1973)

T.H. Sonawane

Member of Parliament, Lok Sabha
- In office 1957–1971
- Succeeded by: Nivruti Kamble
- Constituency: Pandharpur, Maharashtra

Personal details
- Born: 10 September 1910 Najhra, Solapur, Bombay Presidency, British India
- Died: 10 November 1973 (aged 63) Bombay, India
- Party: Indian National Congress
- Spouse: Yashodabai

Tayappa Hari Sonawane (10 September 1910 – 10 November 1973) was an Indian politician. He was elected to the Lok Sabha, the lower house of the Parliament of India as a member of the Indian National Congress.

Sonawane died in Bombay on 10 November 1973, at the age of 63.
