= Sreejaya Chavan =

Indian politician

Adv. Sreejaya Chavan

Member of the Maharashtra Legislative Assembly
- Incumbent
- Assumed office November 2024
- Preceded by: Ashok Chavan
- Constituency: Bhokar

Personal details
- Party: Bharatiya Janata Party
- Parent(s): Ashok Chavan and Ameeta Ashokrao Chavan
- Education: Mumbai University
- Profession: Lawyer

Sreejaya Ashokrao Chavan is an Indian politician. At a very young age of 32 she was elected to the Maharashtra Legislative Assembly from Bhokar as a member of the Bharatiya Janata Party.
