= Devyani Khobragade incident =

2013 arrest and detention in New York City

On December 11, 2013, Devyani Khobragade, then the Deputy Consul General of the Consulate General of India in New York City, was charged by U.S. authorities with committing visa fraud and providing false statements in order to gain entry to the United States for Sangeeta Richard, a woman of Indian nationality, for employment as a domestic worker for Khobragade in New York. She was additionally charged with failing to pay the domestic worker a minimum wage.

Khobragade was arrested the next day by U.S. federal law enforcement authorities, subjected to a "strip search", presented to a judge, and released the same day. Her arrest and treatment received much media attention particularly in India, and led to a diplomatic row between India and the United States.

One week later, Khobragade was transferred by the government of India to the UN mission in New York, subject to clearance from the United States Department of State, which would entitle her to full diplomatic immunity. Her former post entitled her only to consular immunity.

On January 8, 2014, the U.S. issued Khobragade the G-1 visa that granted her full diplomatic immunity. Following this an unknown US State official is reported to have stated "The US requested waiver of immunity (of Devyani Khobragade). India denied that request. We then requested her departure, as per the standard procedure and the charges remain in place." The next day, Khobragade left the United States by plane to India. That same day she was indicted by a federal grand jury with visa fraud and making false statements.

On March 12, 2014, Judge Shira Scheindlin ordered that all charges against Khobragade be dismissed because she had diplomatic immunity at the time of her indictment on visa fraud charges due to her posting to the United Nations prior to the indictment. Two days later, Khobragade was re-indicted on the same charges.

== People ==
=== Devyani Khobragade ===
Devyani Khobragade is an Indian Foreign Service officer and a medical doctor who until December 18, 2013, was deputy consul general in the Consulate General of India in New York. She joined Indian Foreign Service in 1999. In her capacity of deputy consul general for India, she handled women's affairs as well as political and economic issues. Khobragade is married, with two children, to a U.S. citizen, Aakash Singh Rathore whose birthplace has not been verified.

=== Sangeeta Richard ===
Sangeeta Richard, 42, an Indian national and earlier holder of an Indian diplomatic passport, worked as nanny and domestic help for Khobragade from November 2012 until June 2013. Her husband, Philip Richard, used to work as a driver with the Mozambique mission in New Delhi. It has been reported that Sangeeta's mother-in-law was employed with a senior US diplomat, who was posted in India between 2002 and 2007 and her father-in-law is still working in the US embassy in India.

== Timeline ==
=== Hiring of Richard ===
In November 2012, Khobragade employed Richard, as a nanny and domestic servant for her residence in New York. Richard traveled on an Indian diplomatic passport issued by the government of India for its diplomatic staff. Richard entered the U.S. on an A-3 visa, which is a non-immigrant visa and permits the holder to work anywhere in the US for a specified employer.

In a legal complaint later filed by Richard and the United States government, it was described that before hire, Khobragade and Sangeeta Richard verbally agreed in India to a starting salary of 25,000 rupees per month, plus an additional 5,000 rupees for overtime. Based on the exchange rate at that time, 30,000 rupees was equivalent to 573.07 U.S. dollars or about $3.31 an hour, assuming a 40-hour work week. Khobragade signed a written contract with Richard which stipulated her hourly salary in the U.S. would be $9.75 and that the normal working hours per week shall be 40. This contract was submitted to the U.S. government as part of the visa application where Khobragade stated Richard would be making "around $4,500 per month". The complaint claims that Khobragade instructed Richard not to say anything to the embassy interviewer about being paid only 30,000 rupees per month, but to say she would be paid $9.75 an hour and work 40 hours a week.

The complaint then alleges that Khobragade asked Richard to sign another employment contract shortly before leaving India, which was not intended to be revealed to the U.S. government. This second contract allegedly says she was to be paid an expected salary of Rs. 30,000 per month with no mention of sick days or vacation time.

=== Richard leaving Khobragade's home ===
On June 21, 2013, Khobragade left her children in the care of Richard and went on an out-of-town trip. On returning on June 23, 2013, Khobragade found Richard missing from her home. On June 24, 2013, Khobragade informed the Office of Foreign Missions (OFM) and requested help in tracing Richard. The OFM directed her to file a missing person report with New York City Police Department (NYPD). Initially NYPD refused to file the report, since Richard was not a family member. After written requests made on June 25, 2013, the NYPD filed a missing person report. The NYPD then closed the case and it determined that Richard had simply left.

After walking out of the house, Richard lived on the support of strangers within the Indian community in New York City, including a Gurdwara. Later, Richard contacted Safe Horizon, a nonprofit that has an anti-trafficking program, which took Richard to the State Department with the allegations.

On July 1, 2013, Khobragade received a phone call from a person claiming to be Richard's lawyer and requesting her to process a change in visa status of Richard and provide compensation based on 19 hours of work per day. Khobragade refused to negotiate on the phone and demanded the caller's identity. On July 2, 2013, Khobragade informed OFM to direct NYPD to identify the caller as the caller was trying to extort money. On July 5, 2013, Khobragade filed a complaint of "aggravated harassment" with NYPD alleging extortion and blackmail by the caller. In India, officials briefed US embassy officials about the reports filed with NYPD and sought assistance in the matter. The Indian Embassy in Washington also made similar requests with the State Department in Washington.

On July 8, 2013, "Access Immigration", a law office representing Richard, called for a meeting with Khobragade. Khobragade with other consulate officers met Richard. Richard requested payment of US$10,000, conversion of her Indian diplomatic passport to an India ordinary passport and assistance for getting required US visa for continued stay in United States. Indian consulate officers informed Richard that she was required to return to India as she was on an Indian diplomatic passport and that compensation regarding work hours would be settled before departure to India.

On July 19, 2013, Philip Richard, husband of Richard, filed a petition in Indian court alleging that Khobragade and the Indian government held his wife in police custody in New York and had kept in "slavery-like conditions or keeping a person in bondage". The petition also stated that Uttam Khobragade had called Richard's family in India and threatened them with dire consequences if Richard were to complain. The petition was withdrawn four days later.

=== Legal action against Richard ===
Following the July 8 meeting, the Indian government revoked Richard's Indian diplomatic passport with effect from June 22, 2013, and informed OFM about the termination of the passport.

On September 4, 2013, the US State Department issued a letter to the Indian ambassador to probe the allegation of Richard and for proof of minimum wages paid. Following this, on September 10, 2013, the Indian Ministry of External Affairs lodged strong protest with the US officials regarding the tone and content of the letter. Then, on September 21, 2013, the Indian Embassy sent a reply to the US State Department, highlighting that Richard seeks to subvert both Indian and US laws.

On November 19, 2013, based on a complaint lodged by Khobragade, a Delhi court issued a non-bailable arrest warrant against Richard, which was forwarded to US State Department and US embassy for her immediate arrest.

On December 10, 2013, Philip Richard, along with two children, went to the U.S. on a T visa; this visa permits victims of human trafficking and their close relatives to stay in the U.S. to testify against those accused of human trafficking crimes. Indian media claimed that the cost of air tickets for Philip Richard, and two children Jennifer and Jatin, was paid by the U.S. Embassy to India.

== Visa fraud charges ==
On December 11, 2013, Khobragade was charged with visa fraud. The charges allege that she committed visa fraud willfully and under penalty of perjury under Title 18, United States Code, Section 1546. It further alleges that Khobragade submitted an employment contract to the U.S. Department of State, in support of a visa application filed by Khobragade for another individual, which she knew to contain materially false and fraudulent statements. The visa fraud charge carries a maximum sentence of 10 years in prison and the false statements charge carries a maximum sentence of five years.

=== Arrest ===
Based on the charges filed by a special agent with the US Department of State, Bureau of Diplomatic Security, the United States magistrate judge Debra Freeman issued an arrest warrant against Khobragade. Khobragade was arrested by US Department of State's Diplomatic Security Service on December 12, 2013, around 9:30 am after dropping off her daughters at school on West 97th Street in Manhattan.

Around noon, Khobragade was escorted to the federal courthouse in downtown Manhattan, where she was transferred into the custody of the U.S. Marshals Service and strip searched by a female deputy marshal in a private setting. She was presented before a U.S. magistrate judge and pleaded not guilty to the charges. She was released at 4 p.m. the same day on a $250,000 recognizance bond. She also surrendered her passport.

After her release, Khobragade wrote an email to her colleagues in the Indian Foreign Service where she claimed that she "broke down many times", owing to "the indignities of repeated handcuffing, stripping, and cavity searches, swabbing", and to being held "with common criminals and drug addicts".

The next day, Indian media sources echoed her claims that after her arrest she was handcuffed, strip searched, DNA swabbed and subjected to a cavity search.

On December 18, 2013, Nikki Credic-Barrett, a spokeswoman for the U.S. Marshals Service, stated that Khobragade was strip searched but not subjected to a cavity search. Per agency regulations, a strip search can include a "visual inspection" of body cavities. Credic-Barrett also stated that anyone taken to holding cells of the New York federal courthouse is automatically subjected to a strip search if they are placed among other prisoners. With reference to DNA swabbing, Credic-Barrett said that the responsibility for collection of a DNA sample was that of the arresting agency, US Department of State, Bureau of Diplomatic Security.

On December 19, 2013, Preet Bharara, U.S. Attorney for the Southern District of New York, claimed that after her arrest, Khobragade was "accorded courtesies well beyond what other defendants, most of whom are American citizens, are accorded". For about two hours after her arrest, she was allowed to make numerous phone calls in order to arrange for child care and sort out personal matters.

=== Post transfer to United Nations ===
The Indian government moved Khobragade to a permanent position at the Indian Mission at the United Nations, New York in order to provide her with diplomatic immunity. The US State Department clarified that the full diplomatic immunity which she might receive in that post would not be retroactive. On December 23, 2013, the United Nations approved a request from India to accredit Khobragade, but also stated that US approval was still needed. Khobragade was granted an exemption from personally appearing in court for the case.

Khobragade was granted a G-1 visa by the United States Department of State on January 8, 2014, under the terms of Section 15 of the Headquarters Agreement between the United Nations and the United States which gave her full diplomatic immunity and would preclude any court jurisdiction over her. The U.S. officials said that the State Department had no choice but to grant Khobragade full diplomatic immunity once she was accredited to the United Nations because she did not pose a national security threat.

=== Indictment and return to India ===
On January 9, 2014, a US grand jury indicted her on two counts, for visa fraud and making false statements to get a work visa for Sangeeta Richard, her housekeeper in New York. Preet Bharara later confirmed that the charges against her will remain pending until she can be brought to court to face them, either through a waiver of immunity or her return to the US without immunity status. Hours after Khobragade was indicted for visa fraud, India refused the US request to waive the immunity and transferred her to the Ministry of External Affairs in New Delhi.

On January 9, 2014, Khobragade left the United States by plane to India after first receiving permission from U.S. District Judge Shira Scheindlin upon the advice of her lawyer, Daniel Arshack. As she left, she commented to an American colleague about her own leaving and Mrs. and Mr. Richard staying by saying that, "You have lost a good friend. It is unfortunate. In return, you got a maid and a drunken driver. They are in, and we are out."

There are other accounts that despite Khobragade's media bravado, she was reluctant to leave US and had to be sternly told to return to India by the Indian External Ministry.

Khobragade's children, aged 4 and 7, have remained in the U.S. with her husband Dr. Aakash Singh Rathore, who was then a visiting scholar in the department of Arts and Sciences at University of Pennsylvania. All three are United States citizens. Khobragade may only return to the U.S. to submit to the jurisdiction of a court. Upon returning to India, Khobragade expressed that she missed her family. "I wonder if I will be able to ever reunite with my family, my husband, my little kids. I miss them ... What if I can never return to the US, which I cannot now. Does it mean we will never be able to live together as a family again?" she said. On January 13 it was announced that Foreign Secretary Sujatha Singh had placed a gag order on Khobragade. As of February 9 Khobragade's husband and children were living in the apartment for Devyani Khobragade at the Indian Embassy in Turtle Bay, Manhattan, creating the unusual situation in which they as American citizens had access to the Indian Embassy and the apartment without living with a diplomat. Her husband planned to return to India with the children within two weeks. He had apparently received a job offer to teach at Jawaharlal Nehru University in Delhi which the Vice challencor at that time, S.K Sopory said he was not aware about.

=== Dismissal and re-issuance of indictment ===
==== Dismissal ====
On February 8, 2014, Khobragade moved for her visa fraud charge to be dismissed, reasoning that the country had no authority over her as she was granted diplomatic immunity when the indictment case was filed. The prosecution opposed the motion, reasoning: "Having left the U.S. and returned to India, the defendant currently has no diplomatic or consular status in the U.S., and the consular level immunity that she did have at the relevant times does not give her immunity from the charges in this case, crimes arising out of non-official acts."

On March 12, 2014, Judge Shira Scheindlin ordered that all charges against Khobragade be dismissed. Her ruling noted that Khobragade received diplomatic immunity from the United Nations on January 8 and she held that immunity until January 9, on which day she left the United States. Since the indictment was issued on January 9, the court found that "the government may not proceed on an indictment obtained when Khobragade was immune from the jurisdiction of the court." The order did leave open the possibility that prosecutors could bring a new indictment, given that she no longer had immunity, having departed the U.S. Immediately after the indictment was dismissed, prosecutor Preet Bharara's office stated "there is currently no bar to a new indictment against her for her alleged criminal conduct, and we intend to proceed accordingly". Devyani Khobragade's father Uttam Khobragade said, "They tried to trap Devyani with a false complaint against her. I thank the Indian government and the Indians for their cooperation and help. She will go back to America with full diplomatic immunity."

==== Re-issuance of indictment ====
On March 14, 2014, Khobragade was re-indicted on the same charges. A new warrant for Khobragade's arrest was subsequently issued. Salman Khurshid, Indian Cabinet Minister of the Ministry of External Affairs, said that the re-issuance of an indictment was "extremely irksome".

== US diplomat expulsion ==
On January 10 the Indian government ordered the expulsion of US diplomat Wayne May because he had assisted Richard's family in securing T-visas and traveling to the United States. Media sources stated that May had taken "unilateral actions" in expediting the travel of Richard's family from India and violated various procedures with respect to actions taken related to the case. Media sources also quoted disparaging remarks about India and Indian culture made by May and his wife on their personal social media accounts since their posting to New Delhi. At the time of his expulsion, May was the head of the embassy's diplomatic security contingent managing a staff of 424 security officers including 10 Marine security guards, and had been in India since 2010. The expulsion of a US diplomat by India is viewed as unprecedented. In the history of the US-India relationships, a similar event has happened only once when India blocked appointment of George G B Griffin, a Reagan appointee, to the post of US political counselor, the third-ranking post in the United States Embassy.

Sangeeta Richard's parent's-in-law worked for Wayne May, and he was accused of "evacuating" Richard's family illegally two days prior to Khobragade's arrest.

== Reactions and effects ==
=== Khobragade ===
In an email to her Indian diplomatic colleagues released to the media on December 18, 2013, Khobragade wrote:

I am so grateful for all the outpouring of unequivocal support and backing that has been available to me from the fraternity. I take comfort in the confidence that this invaluable support will also be translated into strong and swift action, to ensure the safety of me and my children, as also to preserve the dignity of our service which is unquestionably under siege. While I was going through it, although I must admit that I broke down many times as the indignities of repeated handcuffing, stripping and cavity searches, swabbing, hold up with common criminals and drug addicts were all being imposed upon me despite my incessant assertions of immunity, I got the strength to regain composure and remain dignified thinking that I must represent all of my colleagues and my country with confidence and pride. I feel I can continue to do so thanks to this strong and prolific support.

=== India ===
In India, much of criticism of the actions of the US authorities centered on the claims made by Indian media that Khobragade was handcuffed in public, subjected to a strip search, and made to share a cell with "drug addicts".

Government officials and ministers in India reacted strongly against the arrest of the diplomat and cited the Vienna Convention on Consular Relations whereby diplomats enjoy immunity. US government officials maintain that they followed "standard procedures", and that Khobragade has only consular immunity, giving her protection from arrest related to her consular duties but not to crimes committed on US soil. India's Foreign Secretary Sujatha Singh registered a protest with the US ambassador to India Nancy Jo Powell. Powell clarified that immunity from US courts only applies to "acts performed in the exercise of consular functions."

In further protest, several senior politicians and officials from Indian government refused to meet the US Congressional delegation that was visiting India at that time. These included Speaker of the Lok Sabha Meira Kumar, Minister of Home Affairs Sushilkumar Shinde, Congress Vice President Rahul Gandhi and prime ministerial candidate of NDA for the then upcoming 2014 Indian general elections and Chief Minister of Gujarat Narendra Modi. The US Congressional delegation included representatives George Holding, Pete Olson, David Schweikert, Rob Woodall and Madeleine Bordallo.

Former Finance Minister Yashwant Sinha called for the arrest of same-sex companions of US diplomats, citing the Supreme Court of India's recent upholding of Section 377 of the Indian Penal Code. The Indian government asked US consular officers posted in India to return all identity cards.

On December 17, 2013, Delhi Police removed security barricades on the road outside the US Embassy in New Delhi, citing need for improvement of traffic flow in that area. India has demanded an unconditional apology from the US government and asked the details of the salaries of all domestic help, gardeners and other staff employed by US consulates in India to check for inconsistency or frauds. India moved to block perks such as alcohol and food imports at concessional rates, for embassy employees. With new restrictions, U.S. Embassy vehicles will not be immune to traffic violations, the restrictions also requires the embassy not to hold "Commercial Activities" in its premises. Indian income tax and immigration authorities are investigating allegations of work-permit, visa and income tax fraud at the American Embassy School.

On December 18, 2013, the Prime Minister of India, Manmohan Singh, criticized the actions of the US authorities as "deplorable". Bahujan Samaj Party leader Mayawati complained that the Indian government was not reacting strongly enough, asserting that it was insufficiently supportive to Khobragade because she belonged to a Dalit caste.

Protests took place outside the US consulates in New Delhi, Mumbai, Chennai and Hyderabad.

On January 23, 2014, Indian External Affairs Minister Salman Khurshid raised with US Secretary of State John Kerry, the issue of granting US visa to the husband of Sangeeta Richard despite a police case pending against him in a Delhi court.

On January 29, 2014, Indian ambassador to United States, S Jaishankar opined that this incident should never have happened and called for the need of greater sensitivity, of better understanding and of stronger oversight of ties between two countries.

On February 13, 2014, the front-runner in opinion polls to lead the next Indian government, Narendra Modi, echoed the Indian government's position in calling for a permanent solution to the Devyani Khobragade issue during his talks with the US Ambassador Nancy Powell.

On March 15, 2014, Indian government spokesman Syed Akbaruddin said India was "disappointed" by the U.S. Justice Department's second indictment of Khobragade, calling the decision to do so "unnecessary" and warned that: "Any measures consequent to this decision in the US will unfortunately impact upon efforts on both sides to build the India-US strategic partnership, to which both sides are committed." He added that the Indian government will "no longer engage on this case in the United States' legal system".

=== United States ===
On December 18, 2013, John Kerry expressed regret over the circumstances regarding the arrest and strip-search of the Indian diplomat Devyani Khobragade and empathized as a father of two daughters at similar age as Khobragade.

Preet Bharara, U.S. Attorney for the Southern District of New York, whose office had filed the charges, defended the handling of the arrest and custody, though his office was not involved. He claimed that Khobragade was accorded courtesies well beyond what other defendants, most of whom are American citizens, are accorded.

On the evening of December 19, 2013, US undersecretary of state for political affairs Wendy Sherman called up Indian foreign secretary Sujatha Singh to convey regrets regarding the episode. Sherman offered a consular dialogue between India and US to resolve the problems of domestic staff and immunity issue. Sherman spoke with Indian Foreign Secretary Sujatha Singh to stress the importance of ties following the arrest details and pledged to work through the complex issues of the case.

On December 19, 2013, State Department Spokeswoman Marie Harf told reporters Washington was not pressuring U.S. law enforcement to drop the case.

On March 14, 2014, when Khobragade was indicted again after a dismissal of the first indictment on March 12, State Department Spokeswoman Marie Harf told reporters that the State Department stands by the court papers it had filed opposing Khobragade's bid to get the charges dismissed.

On 28 May 2014, Robert D. Blackwill, the former US ambassador to India from 2001 to 2003 and currently a Henry A. Kissinger senior fellow for US foreign policy at the Council on Foreign Relations (CFR) opined that the treatment meted out to Devyani Khobragade and the subsequent impact of the incident on US-India relations as giving a "new meaning to the word stupid".

Speaking at Harvard Law School in 2014, the U.S. Attorney for the Southern District of New York, Preet Bharara, in the Khobragade case, said: "(It was) not the crime of the century but a serious crime nonetheless, that is why the State Department opened the case, that is why the State Department investigated it. That is why career agents in the State Department asked career prosecutors in my office to approve criminal charges." Bharara, who was born in India, said that he was upset by attacks on him in the Indian press.

The 2014 State Department's annual Trafficking in Persons (TIP) report appeared to classify the Khobragade incident as an example of human trafficking, stating: "An Indian consular officer at the New York consulate was indicted in December 2013 for visa fraud related to her alleged exploitation of an Indian domestic worker." In response, India has shown no urgency to allow visits to India by the newly appointed US anti-people trafficking ambassador Susan P. Coppedge. Indian ambassador to the US, Arun K. Singh reiterated India's commitment to work within an international framework to tackle the problem of trafficking but rejected any "unilateral assessments" by another country saying "We will never accept it" and downplayed the importance of the visits: "When you ask a U.S. official when somebody will be given a visa, they always say 'we will assess when visa is applied for.' ... I can do no better than to reiterate the U.S. position."

=== Sangeeta Richard ===
Sangeeta Richard, the domestic worker in the Khobragade case, is being represented by Safe Horizon, a victim assistance agency. On December 20, 2013, Dana Sussman, staff attorney in the anti-trafficking program at Safe Horizon said there was "frustration and disappointment that the media and the officials portrayed this story in the way that they have." Sussman also denied claims that Richard had sought to extort money from Khobragde after leaving her employment. "She essentially worked very long hours, was isolated within the home, and attempted to ask for more time off, ask for more reasonable hours, but those attempts to resolve the issues were unsuccessful." Describing Richard's reaction to the publicity surrounding the case, Sussman said "It's quite overwhelming for her. I think she's been frustrated with the response that somehow has been on the victimization of the defendant."

In court papers filed in Delhi, Richard's husband Phillip alleged that she was required to work from 6 am to 11 pm every day, with just two hours off on Sunday to go to church. He also claimed that money was deducted from Richard's wages when she fell ill, and that Uttam Khobragade, Devyani's father, had threatened the Richard family with abduction and false drugs allegations if Richard complained about her treatment.

In January 2014, several days after Sangeeta and her husband had started to live together in US, the couple filed for divorce.

=== Domestic worker groups ===
On December 20 a group of nearly fifty people representing migrant domestic workers protested for an hour outside the Indian Consulate in New York City. Among the rights groups were Safe Horizon, the victim assistance agency representing Richard, the National Domestic Workers Alliance, Damayan Migrant Workers Association and the National Guestworker Alliance. Yomara Velez of the National Domestic Workers Alliance said "We are calling for a fair trial and compensation for Richard. There is a larger issue here about diplomatic immunity and about how do we provide basic labour protections for all domestic workers not just in the US but globally as well."

== See also ==
- Nannygate
