= JP Dange =

Indian Administrative Service Officer

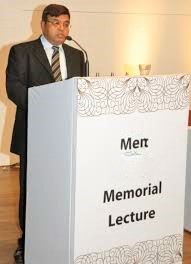

Member - Ministry of Social Justice & Empowerment, Government Of India
- In office 2017–2019
- Prime Minister: Narendra Modi

State Finance Commission Chairman - Maharashtra
- In office 2011–2016
- Prime Minister: Manmohan Singh Narendra Modi
- Governor: K. Sankaranarayanan, C. Vidyasagar Rao

Chief Secretary - Government of Maharashtra
- In office 2009–2011
- Governor: S.C. Jamir
- Preceded by: Johny Joseph
- Succeeded by: R. Y. Gaikwad.

Personal details
- Spouse: Kanta Dange
- Children: Dr.Ravindra Dange (IRS); Dr.Nirupama Dange (IAS)
- Education: Bath University (United Kingdom), Pune University, Nagpur University
- Occupation: Civil service IAS
- Profession: Civil Servant, Writer

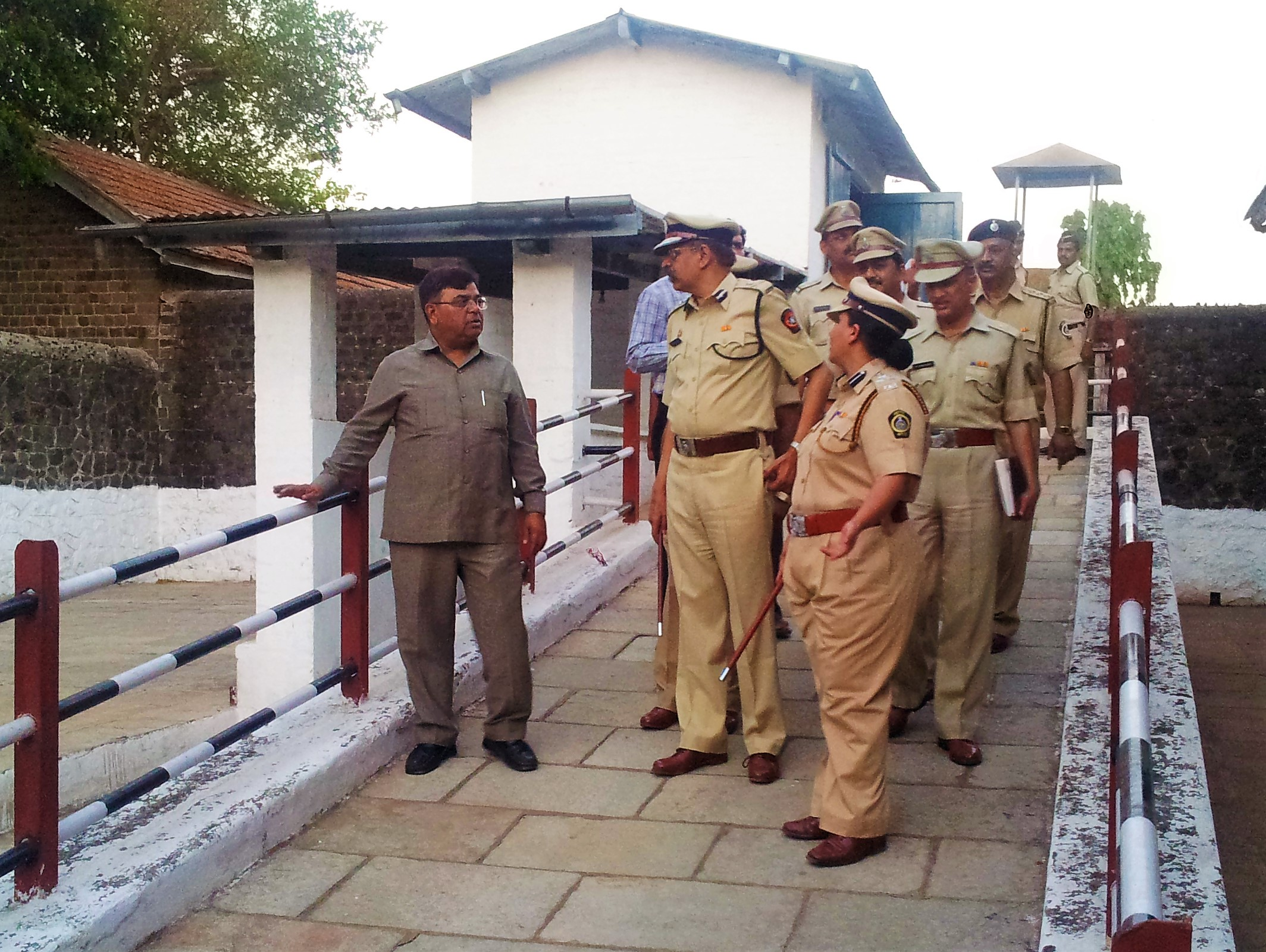
Official Inspection of Undertrials, Convicts and Women Prisoners at Central Prison, India. Shri J.P Dange IAS, Chairman Finance Commission accompanied by Addl. DG (Law & Order), IG (Prisons), DIG(Prisons), SP and PIs.

JP Dange was the Chief Secretary Government of Maharashtra and Civil service IAS officer in Maharashtra. He Graduated from Nagpur University with Bachelors in Law (L.L.B) and Commerce (B.Com.) and Post-graduated from Pune University with Masters in Business Administration (M.B.A). He further did M.Sc. in Development Administration from Bath University (United Kingdom) under the Colombo Plan. He was 'AIR' - 38 at Combined Defense Services Examination 1972 in first attempt and appointed as Commissioned Officer in IAF at Defense Services Staff College, Wellington by the President of India. He was 'AIR' - 23 at the Union Public Service Commission Civil Services Examination 1973 in first attempt and got selected in the Indian Administrative Service (I.A.S) aged 21. He was appointed by the Union and State Government as the youngest 'Home Secretary' aged 37 Years after the serial Bombay Bomb Blasts, 1993. He was tasked as Competent Authority in capacity of Hon'ble Chief Secretary in management of Ajmal Kasab Hanging - Operation X in 2011–12. In recognition of his long and illustrious Administrative Service of 46 Years, he was given 'Best Governance Award' by Government of India, Ministry of Housing and Urban Affairs in 2020.

== Positions held in Election Commission of India, Govt. Of India ==
▪General Observer - M.P Baramulla, J & K. 2006

▪General Observer - M.L.A Bikaner, Rajasthan. 2005

▪General Observer - M.P Patna, Bihar. 2004

▪General Observer - M.L.A Aizawl, Mizoram. 2003

▪General Observer - M.L.A Imphal, Manipur. 2002

▪General Observer - M.L.A Chennai, Tamil Nadu. 2000

▪General Observer - M.P Basti, Uttar Pradesh. 1999

▪General Observer - M.L.A Sirsa, Haryana. 1998

▪General Observer - M.P Hoshiarpur, Punjab. 1996

▪General Observer - M.L.C Latur, Maharashtra. 1991

== Positions held in the Maharashtra Government ==
- Chairman - All India Administrative Services Examination Committee
- Chairman - Admission Regulating Authority
- Hon'ble Member - Maharashtra Revenue Tribunal (Judicial)
- 4th State Finance Commission Chairman - Maharashtra
- Chief Secretary - Government of Maharashtra
- Additional Chief Secretary - Revenue Department Maharashtra.
- Additional Chief Secretary - Forest Department Maharashtra.
- Principal Secretary - Cooperation and Labour Department
- Principal Secretary - Animal Husbandry, Fisheries, Dairy Department
- Secretary - Trade, Commerce, Mining Department
- Secretary - Social Welfare Department
- Secretary - Sports, Vocational Department
- Secretary - Home Department (Preventive Detention)
- CEO - Home Department (Maritime Security, Operations, Personnel)
- Commissioner of Thane Municipal Corporation
- Commissioner of Nashik Municipal Corporation
- Addl. Commissioner - Aurangabad
- Addl. Commissioner - Nagpur
- Collector and District Magistrate - Bhandara
- Collector and District Magistrate - Osmanabad
- Settlement Commissioner, Maharashtra
- Chairman - PCNTDA, Pradikaran.
- Managing Director - MSSC, Government of Maharashtra
- CEO - Zilla Parishad, Buldhana
- CEO - Zilla Parishad, Nagpur
- CEO - Zilla Parishad, Chandrapur
- Assistant Collector - Nashik
- Assistant Collector - Jalna

== Ex-Officio Membership (2003-2011) ==
▪Chairman - State Civil Services Board (IAS, IPS, Central Services)

▪Chairman - High Power Committees (P.D.S, Infra Development, Medical Education, Public Health, Irrigation, Police Establishments, State Security, Urban Development & Rural Development Board)

▪Chairman - CIDCO, MIDC, MADC, YASHADA, SIAC, NABARD

▪Member - State Civil Services Board (IFoS)

▪Member - Maharashtra Judicial Academy

== Personal Details ==
J P Dange is married to Kanta Dange who is a former school teacher and ex-president of 'IASOWA' Maharashtra. They have two sons and one daughter. All of them are medical post-graduates, eldest son and daughter belong to 2004 batch of Civil Services.
