= Nivruti Satwaji Kamble =

Indian politician (born 1910)

Member of Parliament, Lok Sabha
- In office 1971–1977
- Preceded by: T.H. Sonawane
- Succeeded by: Sandipan Thorat
- Constituency: Pandharpur, Maharashtra

Personal details
- Born: 14 April 1910 Virwade Tal, Mohalh, Solapur, Bombay Presidency, British India
- Party: Republican Party of India
- Spouse: Prayagbai Kamble

Nivruti Satwaji Kamble (born 14 April 1910, date of death unknown) was an Indian politician. He was elected to the Lok Sabha, the lower house of the Parliament of India as a member of the Republican Party of India.
