= Bhokar =

Bhokar भोकर
- Town & Tehsil HQ
- Location in Maharashtra, India Bhokar (India)
- Coordinates: 19.217803°N 77.669392°E
- Country: India
- State: Maharashtra
- Region: Marathwada
- District: Nanded
- Founded by: Satvahana Kings
- Named after: Maharashtra Police Academy

Government
  - Type: Municipal Council
  - Body: BMC
  - Administrator: Pavan Yadav, CEO
  - MLA: Mr.Ashok Chavan
  - MP: Vasant Balwant Chavan
- Elevation: 460.00 m (1,509.19 ft)

Population (2011)
  - Total: 32,899

Languages
  - Official: Marathi
- Time zone: UTC+5:30 (IST)
- PIN: 431 801
- STD Telephone code: 02467
- Vehicle registration: MH 26
- Lok Sabha constituency: Nanded
- Vidhan Sabha constituency: Bhokar
- Nearest city: Nanded

Bhokar is a town, tehsil, municipal council and subdivision of Nanded district in the Indian state of Maharashtra.

== Demographics ==
Religions in Bhokar
Religion	Percent
Hindu	56.61%
Muslim	33.48%
Buddhist	09.21%
Sikh	0.15%
Others†	1%
†Includes Jains

As of the 2011 census, Bhokar had a population of 32,899. The Municipal Council had a gender ratio of 924 females per 1,000 males. 12.4 percent of the population were under six years old. Effective literacy was 87.40 percent. 81.74 percent of women were literate. Male literacy was 92.68 percent.

Year	Male	Female	Total Population	Change	Religion (%)							
Year	Male	Female	Total Population	Change	Hindu	Muslim	Christian	Sikhs	Buddhist	Jain	Other religions and persuasions	Religion not stated
2011	17104	15795	32899	-	56.610	33.475	0.188	0.149	9.210	0.182	0.012	0.173

== See also ==
- Bhokar (Vidhan Sabha constituency)
