= Pandharpur Lok Sabha constituency =

Former constituency of the Indian parliament in Maharashtra

Coordinates: 17.7°N 75.3°E

Pandharpur
- Former Lok Sabha constituency

Constituency details
- Country: India
- Region: Western India
- State: Maharashtra
- Established: 1962
- Abolished: 2008
- Reservation: SC

Pandharpur was a Lok Sabha parliamentary constituency of Maharashtra. It covered Solapur District.

== Members of Parliament ==
Year	Member	Party
1952-62 : Constituency did not exist
1962	Tayappa Hari Sonawane	Indian National Congress
1967	Tayappa Hari Sonawane	Indian National Congress
1971	Nivrutti Satwaji Kamble	Republican Party of India
1977	Sandipan Thorat	Indian National Congress
1980	Sandipan Thorat	Indian National Congress
1984	Sandipan Thorat	Indian National Congress
1989	Sandipan Thorat	Indian National Congress
1991	Sandipan Thorat	Indian National Congress
1996	Sandipan Thorat	Indian National Congress
1998	Sandipan Thorat	Indian National Congress
1999	Ramdas Athawale	Independent
2004	Ramdas Athawale	Republican Party of India (Athawale)
2008 onwards : See Madha Lok Sabha constituency

== Election Results ==
Vote share of Winning candidates
2004	50.38%
1999	52.91%
1998	54.84%
1996	45.45%
1991	66.85%
1989	63.43%
1984	57.17%
1980	57.65%
1977	65.93%
1971	69.44%
1967	50.17%
1962	53.29%

=== 2004 ===
2004 Indian general election: Pandharpur (SC)
Party	Candidate	Votes	%	±%
RPI(A)	Ramdas Athawale	347,215	50.38	▼2.53
BJP	Kshirsagar N. Dattatray	247,522	35.92	▲16.25
IND	Kalyan Lankeshwar	33,265	4.83	
RSPS	Naiknavare Bhagvan	20,684	3.00	
IND	Sharda Sonavane	12,895	1.87	
BSP	Ramesh Nirmal	11,059	1.60	▲1.22
IND	Texasdada Gaikwad	8,135	1.18	
IND	Avinash Kale	4,698	0.68	
PRCP	Sunil Waghmare	3,654	0.53	
Majority		99,693	14.46	▼18.78
Turnout				
RPI(A) gain from Independent		Swing		

=== 1999 ===
1999 Indian general election: Pandharpur (SC)
Party	Candidate	Votes	%	±%
IND	Ramdas Athawale	413,115	52.91	
BJP	Kshirsagar N. Dattatray	153,610	19.67	▼18.14
INC	Sandipan Thorat	111,903	14.33	▼40.51
IND	Dagadu Ghodake	99,242	12.71	
BSP	Pritish Jalgaonkar	2,940	0.38	
Majority		259,505	33.24	▲16.21
Turnout		827,541	74.80	▲21.06
Independent gain from INC		Swing		

=== 1998 ===
1998 Indian general election: Pandharpur (SC)
Party	Candidate	Votes	%	±%
INC	Sandipan Thorat	313,676	54.84	▲9.39
BJP	Sukhdeo Kamble	216,244	37.81	▲7.18
JD	Lalit Parsu Babar	35,253	6.16	
OTH	3 Other Candidates	6,806	1.19	
Majority		97,432	17.03	▲2.21
Turnout		587,626	53.74	▲4.53
INC hold		Swing		

=== 1996 ===
1996 Indian general election: Pandharpur (SC)
Party	Candidate	Votes	%	±%
INC	Sandipan Thorat	230,214	45.45	▼21.40
BJP	Sukhdeo Kamble	155,126	30.63	▲17.56
RPI	Kamble Trimbak	93,642	18.49	
OTH	14 Other Candidates	27,508	5.43	
Majority		75,088	14.82	▼34.91
Turnout		520,828	49.21	▲1.00
INC hold		Swing		

=== 1991 ===
1991 Indian general election: Pandharpur (SC)
Party	Candidate	Votes	%	±%
INC	Sandipan Thorat	315,641	66.85	▲3.42
JD	Arun Kamble	80,833	17.12	
BJP	Shrikant Dhondiram	61,738	13.07	▼2.36
OTH	10 Other Candidates	13,976	2.96	
Majority		234,808	49.73	▲3.09
Turnout		481,168	48.21	▼0.98
INC hold		Swing		

=== 1989 ===
1989 Indian general election: Pandharpur (SC)
Party	Candidate	Votes	%	±%
INC	Sandipan Thorat	296,671	63.43	▲6.26
RPI	Jaydeo Gaikwad	78,527	16.79	▲13.88
BJP	Jagaonkar Shivajirao	72,156	15.43	
IND	13 Independent Candidates	20,382	4.37	
Majority		218,144	46.64	▲27.40
Turnout		481,585	49.19	▼12.75
INC hold		Swing		

=== 1984 ===
1984 Indian general election: Pandharpur (SC)
Party	Candidate	Votes	%	±%
INC	Sandipan Thorat	269,989	57.17	▼0.48
IC(S)	Laxmanrao Dhobale	179,156	37.93	
RPI	Bajirao Kamble	13,765	2.91	▲2.17
IND	4 Independent Candidates	9,362	1.98	
Majority		90,833	19.24	▼6.90
Turnout		486,645	61.94	▲8.38
INC gain from INC(I)		Swing		

=== 1980 ===
1980 Indian general election: Pandharpur (SC)
Party	Candidate	Votes	%	±%
INC(I)	Sandipan Thorat	210,925	57.65	▼8.28
INC(U)	Laxman Dhobale	115,272	31.51	
RPI(K)	Subhanji Bansode	31,819	8.70	▼25.37
IND	Parappa Khadatare	3,176	0.87	
RPI	Ramchandra Jadhav	2,722	0.74	
IND	Nitin Lavangare	1,356	0.37	
IND	Subhana Salve	612	0.17	
Majority		95,653	26.14	▼5.72
Turnout		378,461	53.56	▲1.97
INC(I) gain from INC		Swing		

=== 1977 ===
1977 Indian general election: Pandharpur (SC)
Party	Candidate	Votes	%	±%
INC	Sandipan Thorat	203,709	65.93	
RPI(K)	Manohar Tatyasaheb	105,257	34.07	▲15.37
Majority		98,452	31.86	▼18.88
Turnout		318,855	51.59	▲6.22
INC gain from RPI		Swing		

=== 1971 ===
1971 Indian general election: Pandharpur (SC)
Party	Candidate	Votes	%	±%
RPI	Nivruti Kamble	153,794	69.44	▲19.61
RPI(K)	Sakharam Ramchandra	41,422	18.70	
SSP	Sadashiv Kadam	20,302	9.17	
IND	Ginyani Bhagwan	3,028	1.37	
IND	Chandrakant Sonwane	2,916	1.32	
Majority		112,372	50.74	▲50.40
Turnout		227,757	45.37	▼23.01
RPI gain from INC		Swing		

=== 1967 ===
1967 Indian general election: Pandharpur (SC)
Party	Candidate	Votes	%	±%
INC	T. H. Sonawane	159,818	50.17	▼3.12
RPI	N. S. Kambale	158,739	49.83	▲16.39
Majority		1,079	0.34	▼19.51
Turnout		333,717	68.38	▲14.84
INC hold		Swing		

=== 1962 ===
1962 Indian general election: Pandharpur (SC)
Party	Candidate	Votes	%	±%
INC	T. H. Sonawane	121,716	53.29	
RPI	Sidram Babaji Babar	76,384	33.44	
IND	Kisan Mahadu Shinde	25,317	11.08	
RRP	Sopan Dhondi Sarvagod	4,985	2.18	
Majority		45,332	19.85	
Turnout		238,807	53.54	
INC gain from RPI		Swing		

== See also ==
- Pandharpur
- List of constituencies of the Lok Sabha
