= Ameeta Ashokrao Chavan =

Indian politician

Member of Maharashtra Legislative Assembly
- In office 30 October 2014 – 31 October 2019
- Preceded by: Ashok Chavan
- Succeeded by: Ashok Chavan
- Constituency: Bhokar

Personal details
- Born: Mumbai
- Party: Bharatiya Janata Party
- Other political affiliations: Indian National Congress
- Spouse: Ashok Chavan
- Children: 2, including Sreejaya

Ameeta (Bhabhi) Chavan is an Indian politician belonging to the Bhartiya Janta Party. She was a Member of Legislative Assembly (MLA) of the state from 2014 to 2019. She won from the Bhokar (Vidhan Sabha constituency) in 2014 Maharashtra Legislative Assembly election. defeating BJP's Dr. Madhavrao Kinhalkar. She is married to Ashok Chavan, a former chief minister of the state Maharashtra. The couple is having twins daughter, of which one is Sreejaya Chavan.

== Position held ==
- Member of Legislative Assembly
- Vice-President: Sharda Bhavan Education Society, Nanded
- V.P.- Bhaurao Chavan Co-operative Sugar Industry, Degaon-Yelegaon Dist. Nanded
