= Sandipan Thorat =

Indian politician (1932–2023)

Member of Parliament, Lok Sabha
- In office 22 March 1977 — 6 October 1999
- Preceded by: Nivruti Kamble
- Succeeded by: Ramdas Athawale
- Constituency: Pandharpur, Maharashtra

Personal details
- Born: 6 December 1932 Solapur, Bombay Presidency, British India
- Died: 31 March 2023 (aged 90) Solapur, Maharashtra, India
- Party: Indian National Congress
- Spouse: Prabhawati
- Children: 4 sons and 3 daughters

Sandipan Bhagwan Thorat (6 December 1932 – 31 March 2023) was an Indian National Congress politician who was elected to the Lower House of Indian Parliament the Lok Sabha from Pandharpur, Maharashtra in 1977, 1980, 1984, 1989, 1991, 1996 and 1998.
