= Johny Joseph (civil servant) =

Indian civil servant

Chief Secretary, Government of Maharashtra
- In office 30 April 2007 – 30 November 2009
- Preceded by: D.K. Sankaran
- Succeeded by: JP Dange

Municipal commissioner
- In office 1 March 2004 – 29 April 2007
- Preceded by: K.C. Srivastava
- Succeeded by: Jairaj Phatak

Personal details
- Born: 29 May 1949 (age 77)
- Spouse: Reena Joseph
- Occupation: Civil service IAS

Johny Joseph (born 29 May 1949) is an Indian Administrative Service officer of 1972 batch. He graduated from Trivandrum Engineering College with a degree in Mechanical Engineering and served as commissioner of Brihanmumbai Municipal Corporation from 29 February 2004 to May 2007.

== Work ==
Johny Joseph was the Maharashtra's Principal Secretary to the Chief Minister before the state government granted him the post of the civic chief of Mumbai. He was succeeded by Jairaj Phatak in May 2007. On 1 May 2007, he was appointed as Chief Secretary of Maharashtra.

== Posts held in the Government ==
- Chief Secretary Government of Maharashtra
- Municipal commissioner of Brihanmumbai Municipal Corporation
- Lokayukta

== Personal life ==
Johny Joseph is married to Reena Joseph who is an active environmentalist and patron of several social causes.
