= Republican Party of India (Athawale) =

Splinter group of the Republican Party of India

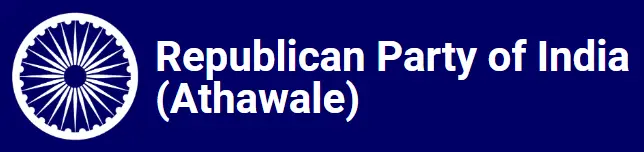
- Abbreviation: RPI (A)
- President: Ramdas Athawale
- Founder: Ramdas Athawale
- Founded: 25 May 1999 (27 years ago)
- Split from: Republican Party of India
- Headquarters: No.11, Safdurjung Road, New Delhi 110001, India
- Ideology: Constitutionalism; Republicanism; Nationalism; Progressivism; Secularism; Egalitarianism
- Political position: Syncretic
- Colours: Blue
- ECI status: State Party
- Alliance: National Democratic Alliance (2011–present); United Progressive Alliance (2004–2011)
- Seats in Rajya Sabha: 1 / 245
- Seats in Lok Sabha: 0 / 543
- Seats in Nagaland Legislative Assembly: 2 / 60

Election symbol
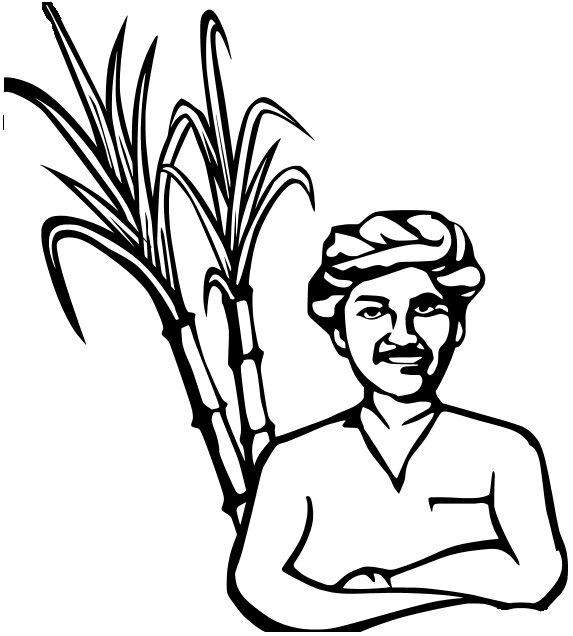
- Farmer

Party flag
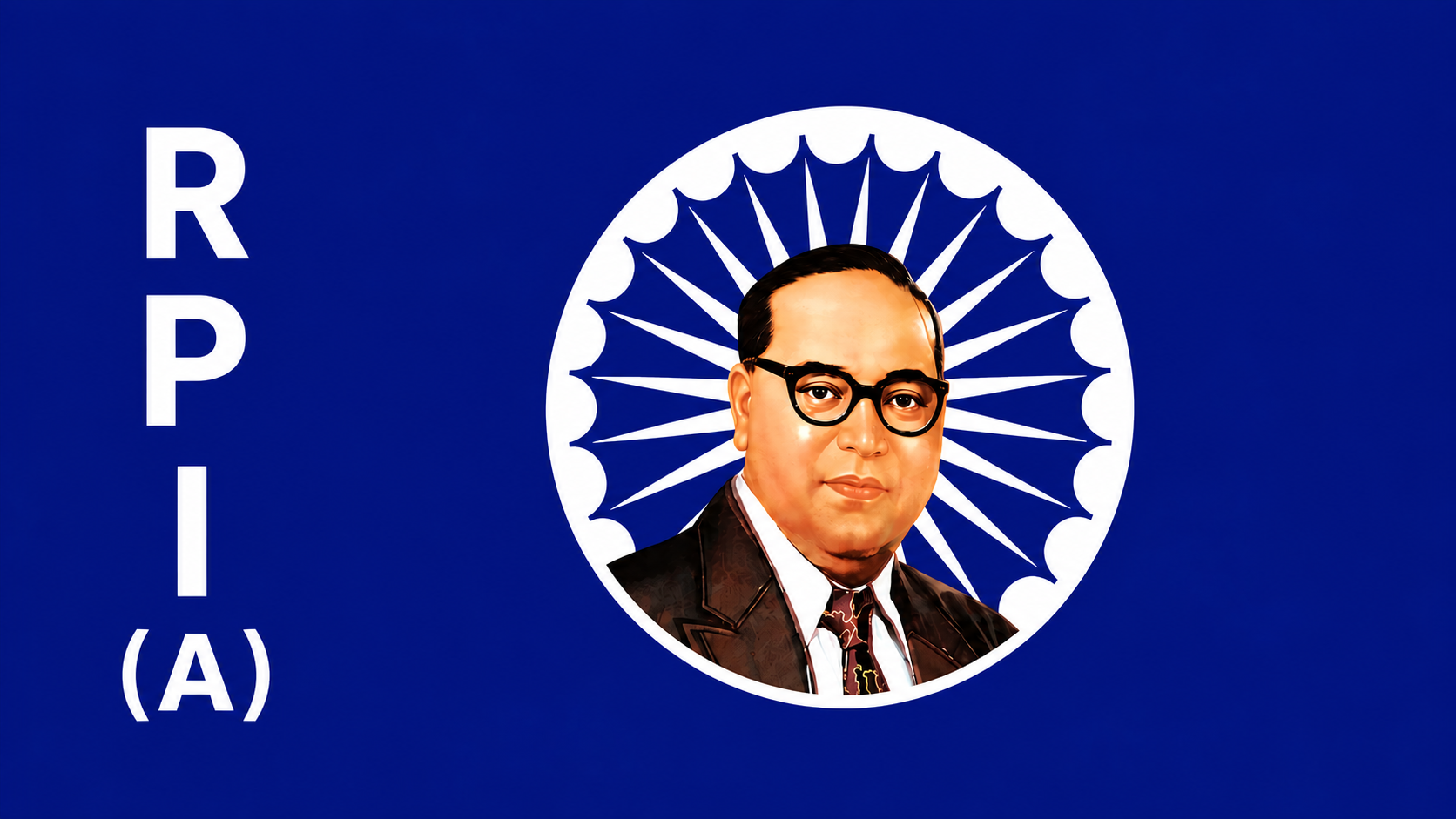

Website
- https://rpiathawale.in

The Republican Party of India (Athawale) is a political party in India. The party is a splinter group of the Republican Party of India. The president of the party is Ramdas Athawale. The party currently holds 1 seat in the Rajya Sabha from Maharashtra.

== Office holders ==
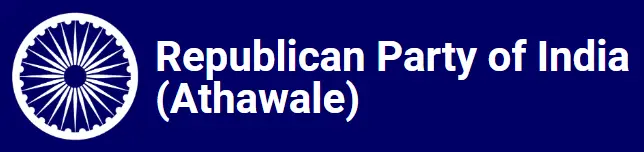
President Republican Party of India (Athawale)
S.No.	Portrait	Name (born /death & Office holders)	Term in office		
S.No.	Portrait	Name (born /death & Office holders)	Assumed office	Left office	Time in office
National President & Founder Republican Party of India (Athawale)
1.		Ramdas Athawale born 25 December 1959	25 May 1999	Incumbent	27 years, 141 days
Secretary General & Republican Party of India (Athawale)
2		Dr Rajeev Menon; National Secretary General	4 August 2010	Incumbent	16 years, 70 days

== History ==
Ramdas Athawale was a member of the Maharashtra Legislative Council from 1990 to 1995 and a cabinet member in the Government of Maharashtra. Subsequently, he was elected to the Parliament of India, representing Mumbai North Central in the 12th Lok Sabha in 1998 and 1999 and the Pandharpur constituency from 1999 to 2004. After the 2004 election, it had a small representation in the Lok Sabha and was a constituent of the ruling United Progressive Alliance (UPA). Its presence is limited to Maharashtra.

All factions of the RPI, except Prakash Ambedkar's Bharipa Bahujan Mahasangh, have united to form the Republican Party of India (United).

In 2011, the party aligned itself with the National Democratic Alliance (NDA), led by the Bharatiya Janata Party (BJP).

In June 2014, Bollywood actress Rakhi Sawant joined the party, and was made the chief of the party's state women's wing.

In September 2015, the RPI(A) was among 16 political parties in Maharashtra whose registrations were revoked for failing to submit audited balance sheets and income tax returns since 2005. As a result, the party lost its official election symbol.

Athawale is a Member of Parliament in the Rajya Sabha. He has been serving as the Minister of State for Social Justice and Empowerment since 2016.

== See also ==
- Politics of India
- List of political parties in India
- National Democratic Alliance
- Dalit
