= Deshmukh Balajirao Gopalrao =

Indian politician

Babasaheb Gorthekar
- बाबासाहेब गोरठेकर

Member of Maharashtra Legislative Assembly
- In office 1980–1990
- Preceded by: Shankarrao Chavan
- Succeeded by: Madhavrao Bhujangrao Kinhalkar
- Constituency: Bhokar
- In office 1999–2004
- Preceded by: Madhavrao Bhujangrao Kinhalkar
- Succeeded by: Bapusaheb Gorthekar
- Constituency: Bhokar

Personal details
- Party: Indian National Congress (till 1999)
- Children: Bapusaheb Gorthekar
- Parent: Gopalrao Sawant-Deshmukh (father)

Balajirao Gopalrao Sawant Deshmukh Gorthekar Alias Babasaheb Gorthekar is a politician and a former member of the Indian National Congress, and son of Gopalrao Gorthekar Deshmukh. He was a Three times Member of the Maharashtra Legislative Assembly from the Bhokar constituency.

He Contested an Assembly election against Shankarrao Chavan in 1978 from Bhokar as Indian National Congress Candidate.
