= Gortha =

Village in Maharashtra

Gortha (a.k.a. Gorthe) is a small village in Umri taluka in Nanded district of Maharashtra an Indian state.

== Das Ganu Maharaj ==
Gorathe is famous for as it related to Saint Das Ganu Maharaj.

== Transportation ==
Gortha is just 5 kilometers from Umari, and on the way to Mudkhed via Umri road. One can also reach via Bhokar-Umri, however road conditions in that direction are poor.

The nearest railway station for Gortha is Umri railway station and is located on the Secunderabad-Manmad section of Nanded railway division of the South Central Railway Zone (SCR).

The nearest airport is Nanded Airport, the Shri Guru Gobind Singh Ji Airport. Currently Hyderabad to Nanded TrueJet flight is already operating on daily basis from 17 April. Under central government's UDAN scheme for regional air connectivity, Nanded will be connected with scheduled regular flights from airline operator TrueJet to Mumbai soon.
