= Ashok Chavan =

Indian politician (born 1958)

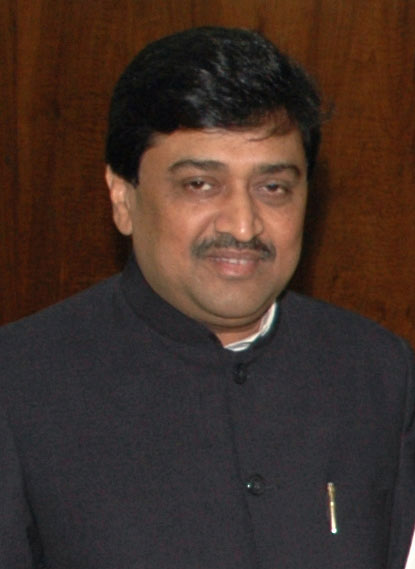
- Chavan in 2008

Member of Parliament, Rajya Sabha
- Incumbent
- Assumed office 3 April 2024
- Preceded by: Narayan Rane
- Constituency: Maharashtra

Ministry of Public Works Government of Maharashtra
- In office 30 December 2019 – 30 June 2022
- Chief Minister: Uddhav Thackeray
- Preceded by: Balasaheb Thorat
- Succeeded by: Eknath Shinde

16th Chief Minister of Maharashtra
- In office 8 December 2008 – 11 November 2010
- Preceded by: Vilasrao Deshmukh
- Succeeded by: Prithviraj Chavan

Minister of Industries & Mining Government of Maharashtra
- In office 9 November 2004 – 8 December 2008
- Chief Minister: Vilasrao Deshmukh
- Preceded by: Vilasrao Deshmukh
- Succeeded by: Narayan Rane

Minister of Transport Government of Maharashtra
- In office 18 January 2003 – 1 November 2004
- Chief Minister: Sushilkumar Shinde
- Preceded by: Shivajirao Moghe
- Succeeded by: Surupsingh Hirya Naik

Minister of Revenue Government of Maharashtra
- In office 18 October 1999 – 18 January 2003
- Chief Minister: Vilasrao Deshmukh
- Preceded by: Narayan Rane
- Succeeded by: Sushilkumar Shinde

Member of Maharashtra Legislative Assembly
- In office 2019–2024
- Preceded by: Ameeta Chavan
- Succeeded by: Sreejaya Chavan
- Constituency: Bhokar
- In office 2009–2014
- Preceded by: Bapusaheb Gorthekar
- Succeeded by: Ameeta Chavan
- Constituency: Bhokar
- In office 1999–2009
- Preceded by: Sahebrao Deshmukh
- Succeeded by: Constituency defunct
- Constituency: Mudkhed

Minister of State Government of Maharashtra
- In office 6 March 1993 – 14 March 1995
- Chief Minister: Sharad Pawar
- Department: Home Affairs; Public Works; Urban Development

Member of Maharashtra Legislative Council
- In office 8 July 1992 – 7 July 1998
- Constituency: elected by Members of Legislative Assembly

Member of Parliament, Lok Sabha
- In office 2014–2019
- Preceded by: Bhaskarrao Patil
- Succeeded by: Prataprao Patil Chikhalikar
- Constituency: Nanded
- In office 1987–1989
- Preceded by: Shankarrao Chavan
- Succeeded by: Venkatesh Kabde
- Constituency: Nanded

Personal details
- Born: Ashok Shankarrao Chavan; 28 October 1958 (age 68) Bombay, Bombay State, India
- Party: Bharatiya Janata Party (2024–present)
- Other political affiliations: Indian National Congress (1977–2024)
- Spouse: Amita Sharma-Chavan (m. 1982)
- Children: 2, including Sreejaya Chavan
- Parents: Shankarrao Chavan (father); Kusumtai Chavan (mother)
- Education: Hazarimal Jomani College (BSc); B.Y.K. College of Commerce (MBA)

Ashok Shankarrao Chavan (born 28 October 1958) is an Indian politician from Maharashtra. He is the son of the late former Maharashtra Chief Minister Shankarrao Chavan. He was one of the most influential leaders of Indian National Congress in Maharashtra but joined Bhartiya Janata Party on 13 February 2024. He served as the chief minister of Maharashtra state from 8 December 2008 to 9 November 2010.

On 9 November 2010, the Congress Party asked him to resign from office over corruption allegations relating to Adarsh Housing Society scam. In the 2014 general elections, despite the allegations and anti-incumbency wave, he won the Lok Sabha election from his Nanded constituency with a comfortable margin. In 2015, he was appointed the president of Maharashtra Pradesh Congress Committee. Chavan lost his Nanded seat in the 2019 Lok Sabha election to Pratap Patil Chikhalikar of the BJP.

Chavan belongs to an influential political family based in Nanded district of Maharashtra state. He is the son of Shankarrao Chavan, a former chief minister of Maharashtra himself; they are the first father–son duo in the state's history to become chief ministers. His brother-in-law Bhaskarrao Bapurao Khatgaonkar Patil was a three-time Member of Legislative Assembly (MLA) and a three-time MP, and Chavan's wife, Amita was MLA from Bhokar constituency in Nanded for years 2014-19.

== Personal life ==
Chavan did his schooling at the St. Xavier's High School, Fort. He graduated in Science and has obtained his Master's in Business Management from Hazarimal Jomani College and B.Y.K. College of Commerce.

Chavan belongs to a political dynasty that includes his father and wife. Chavan's father, Shankarrao Chavan had a long career as a minister and was twice, the chief minister of Maharashtra. He had also served as a senior minister in the national government under various Congress governments. Ashok Chavan is married to Ameeta (née Sharma). Ameeta is current member of Maharashtra Legislative Assembly from Bhokar constituency which has previously been represented by both Shankarrao Chavan and Chavan himself. The couple has twin daughters Srijaya and Sujaya.

== Political career ==
=== Organisational ===
He started career as student leader of University of Pune occupying post of University Representative (UR).

He started his political career in Congress Party as general secretary, Maharashtra Pradesh Congress Committee from 1995 to 1999.

President: Maharashtra Pradesh Congress Committee from 2014 to 2019.

MEMBER: CONGRESS WORKING COMMITTEE from August 2023 to 12 February 2024.

On 12 February 2024, he resigned from the Congress Party's primary membership.

On 13 February 2024, he joined BJP.

=== Electoral politics ===
In 1987–89, he held post of Member of Parliament from Nanded Lok Sabha constituency.

In 1992, he was elected as M.L.C. to the Maharashtra Legislative Council and later joined as minister of state for public works, urban development and home in March 1993.

In 2003, Vilasrao Deshmukh appointed Chavan as minister for transport, ports, cultural affairs and protocol.

In November 2004, he was given the portfolio of industries, mining, cultural affairs and protocol in Maharashtra cabinet.

== As a cabinet minister ==
- 1993: MoS, Home & PWD
- 1999: Minister of revenue and protocol
- 2003: Transport minister
- 2004: Minister of industries
- 2008: Chief Minister of Maharashtra
- 2019: Sworn in as cabinet minister in Uddhav Thackeray's Ministry

== Tenure as Chief Minister of Maharashtra ==
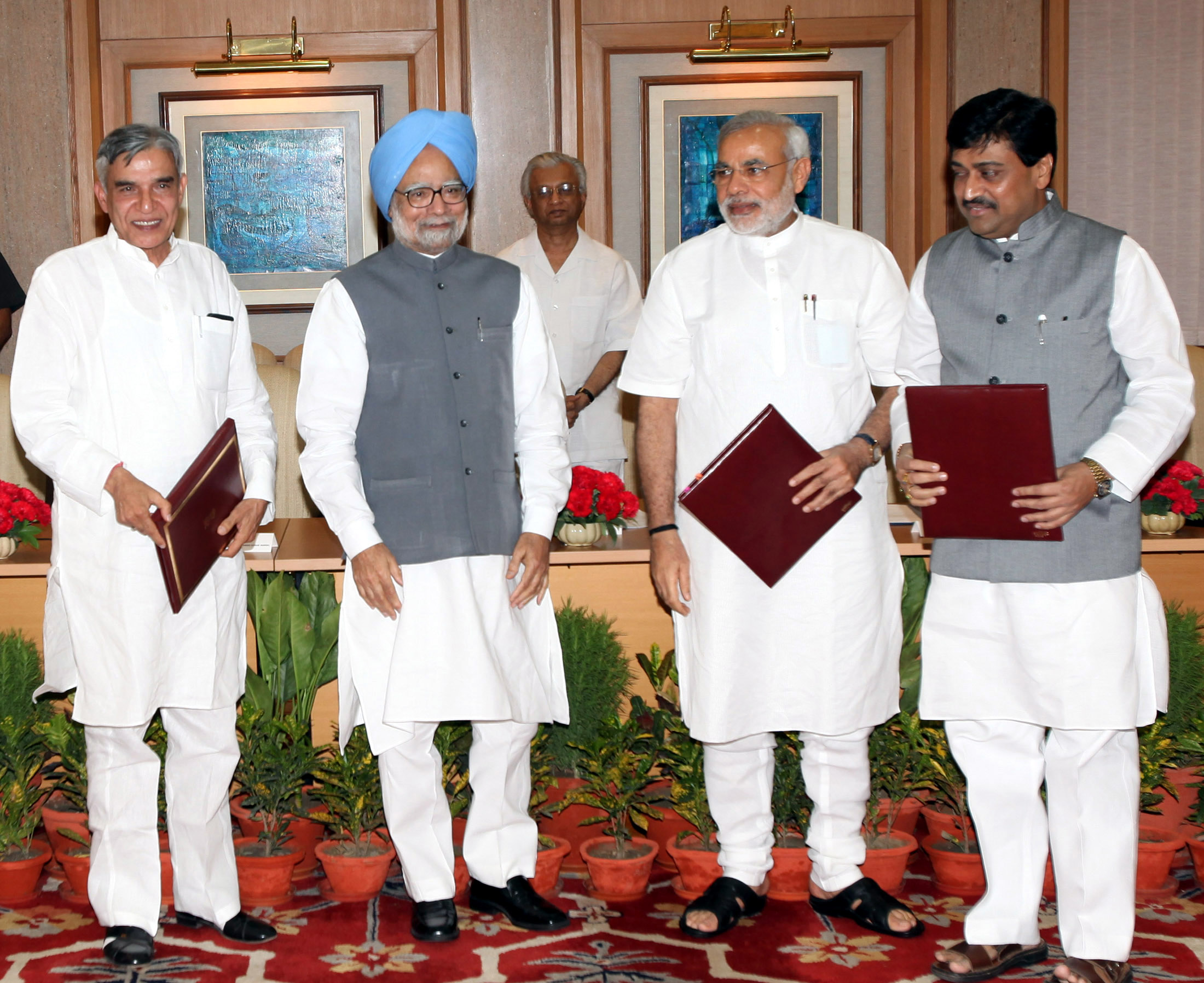
The prime minister, Dr. Manmohan Singh along with the chief minister of Gujarat, Shri Narendra Modi, the chief minister of Maharashtra, Shri Ashok Chavan and the Union Minister for Parliamentary Affairs and Water Resources, Shri Pawan Kumar Bansal at the signing ceremony of a tripartite MoU for preparation of DPR of Damanganga-Pinjal Link Project and Par-Tapi-Narmada Link Project, in New Delhi on 3 May 2010.

In the aftermath of the 2008 Mumbai attacks, Vilasrao Deshmukh took the moral responsibility and offered to resign, which was then accepted by the party and Chavan was elected as Chief Minister of Maharashtra.

After winning assembly elections in 2009, Congress President Sonia Gandhi once again nominated Chavan as the chief minister of Maharashtra. Sharad Pawar, the leader of rival coalition partner NCP party, had been lukewarm towards Chavan, after his first choice of union power minister Sushil Kumar Shinde was ignored well before the race began.

Congress had clearly plumped for a Maratha to lead the party in the state, and had ignored the NCP view that a non-Maratha should be selected for the position to set right the social combination.

As a result, NCP chose a non-Maratha, Chhagan Bhujbal to occupy the deputy chief minister's post and gave the home ministry to Jayant Patil. The latter being a Maratha balanced the NCP's own bid to remain the community's first choice. Chavan was asked to resign as chief minister during a meeting with Congress president, Sonia Gandhi, after it emerged that three of his relatives owned apartments in the Adarsh Housing Society which was created specifically to house Indian war veterans in the upmarket Colaba area of Mumbai. He was succeeded by Prithviraj Chavan.

== Post Chief Minister ==
Despite the corruption allegations, the Congress party put him up as a party candidate for the 2014 Lok Sabha Elections. He won the election by a huge margin. In Maharashtra, Rajiv Satav and Chavan were the only Congress candidates elected.

In 2015, he took over as the chief of the Maharashtra Pradesh Congress Committee.

Chavan contested the 2019 Lok Sabha Elections from Nanded Constituency but lost the election to BJP's Prataprao Patil Chikhalikar. He is one of the 9 former chief ministers of Congress who lost in Lok Sabha 2019 Election. In February 2024, he was nominated for Rajya Sabha from Maharashtra by the BJP.

== Guinness Book Record ==
Both father-son duo has a unique record having been elected in both Houses of Parliament as well as State legislature.

== Controversy, scams and allegations ==
Apart from the much discussed Adarsh Housing Society Scam, Chavan was accused of using his office to fund his relatives' bank. Recently High court of Maharashtra state denied permission to the agency investigating the Adarsh scam to question Chavan.

In the 2009 Assembly Elections, he was accused of hiding expenses on a paid supplement titled Ashok Parva in a leading Marathi daily. However, he denied the allegation by the Election Commission of India of having inserted favourable Paid News in newspapers.

== Election's record ==
- 1999 Maharashtra Legislative Assembly Election
  - Constituency: Mudkhed-Nanded (Nanded district)
  - Result: Won with a strong majority.
  - Role: Served as minister of transport in the Maharashtra government.
- 2004 Maharashtra Legislative Assembly Election
  - Constituency: Mudkhed-Nanded (Nanded district)
  - Result: Won with a strong majority.
  - Role: Served as Minister of Industries, Mines, Protocol, and Cultural Affairs in the Maharashtra government.
- 2009 Maharashtra Legislative Assembly Election
  - Constituency: Bhokar
  - Result: Reelected with a significant margin.
  - Role: Appointed the chief minister of Maharashtra following the election. However, he resigned in 2010 due to allegations related to the Adarsh Housing Society scam.
- 2014 Maharashtra Legislative Assembly Election
  - Constituency: Bhokar
  - Result: Chavan's wife Ameeta Bhabhi elected despite a challenging political environment due to the decline of Congress's influence in the state.
  - Role: Continued as a key Congress leader in Maharashtra.
- 2019 Maharashtra Legislative Assembly Election
  - Constituency: Bhokar
  - Result: Won against BJP candidate Bapusaheb Gorthekar.
  - Role: Played a pivotal role in forming the Maha Vikas Aghadi coalition government.

SI No.	Year	Legislative Assembly	Constituency	Margin	Party	Post
1.	2009	12th	Bhokar	1,07,503	Indian National Congress	Chief Minister of Maharashtra
2.	2019	14th	Bhokar	97,445	Indian National Congress	PWD Minister of Maharashtra

Lok Sabha
Preceded by Shankarrao Chavan	Member of Parliament for Nanded; 1987 – 1989	Succeeded by Venkatesh Kabde
Preceded by Bhaskarrao Bapurao Khatgaonkar Patil	Member of Parliament for Nanded; 2014 – 2019	Succeeded by Prataprao Govindrao Chikhalikar
Political offices
Preceded by Vilasrao Deshmukh	Chief Minister of Maharashtra; 8 December 2008 – 10 November 2010	Succeeded by Prithviraj Chavan
Party political offices
Preceded by Manikrao Thakare	President of Maharashtra Pradesh Congress Committee; 2015 – 2019	Succeeded by Balasaheb Thorat
