= Mukta Venkatesh =

- Born: May 1902; Madras, Tamil Nadu, British Raj
- Died: 2003 (aged 101)
- Known for: Painting

Mukta Venkatesh (May 1902–2003) was an Indian painter. She is best known for her intricate floral paintings.

== Life ==
Mukta Venkatesh was born as Muthulakshmi in Madras, Tamil Nadu in 1902. Her parents Meenakshi and A. Madhaviah, were committed to various social causes and her father was a well-known author in Tamil and English. As a child, she was influenced by her father's passion for literature and progressive views. She was the fourth of the eight children, and she was taught by her father for most of her early life, since they lived along the Coromandel Coast where schools were sparse. Her family survived the influenza pandemic of 1917. Later, she married M. Venkatesh who worked for the Mysore Railways, and had two daughters.

== Career ==
Mukta Venkatesh's art-work contains unique and elaborate floral patterns. While she initially painted outdoor landscapes, Venkatesh later shifted her focus to flowers, since travelling outdoors got harder with age She is also well-known for her skill with embroidery and needle-work. Venkatesh regularly painted even late into her life, and has described painting as a deeply meditative practice: "When I paint I am very happy. I am lost in the effort of how to produce on paper my impression of what I see. So the household problems are kept at bay."
