= Venkatesh Kabde =

Indian politician

Member of the Lok Sabha of Nanded
- In office 1989–1991
- Preceded by: Ashok Shankarrao Chavan
- Succeeded by: Suryakanta Patil

Personal details
- Born: Venkatesh Kabde; 4 September 1940 (age 85) Degloor, Nanded district, Hyderabad State, British India (present-day Maharashtra, India)

Dr. Venkatesh Kabde (born 4 September 1940) is an Indian politician who is representing the former Member of Parliament for Nanded constituency of Maharashtra and was a member of the Janata Dal political party. Dr. Venkatesh Kabde leads the governing body of peoples college Nanded.
