= Dadaji Ramaji Khobragade =

Indian agronomist (1939–2018)

- Born: May 17, 1939
- Died: June 3, 2018 (aged 79)
- Known for: Inventor of HMT-Sona and ten other popular rice varieties

Dadaji Ramaji Khobragade (1939–3 June 2018) was an Indian agronomist who bred and refined a high-yielding variety of paddy, HMT.

D.R. Khobragade belonged to Nanded Village from Nagbhid Taluka of Chandrapur district, Maharashtra.

Around 1983, Khobragade noticed a plant with slightly different appearance and yellowish seeds in his field planted with the 'Patel 3' variety of paddy, which he experimented on in the years to come. The new variety was found giving high yields compared to the varieties available at that time. By 1990, the variety was given a name HMT.

Despite his innovation, Khobragade lived a poor and mostly neglected life. He got some media attention when Forbes magazine named him among seven most powerful entrepreneurs of India in 2010.

He first shot to fame when he accused the state-run Punjabrao Krishi Vidyapeeth (PKV) of taking credit for the brand that he had originally bred on his farm and given to the university scientists in 1994.

While Dadaji claimed the PKV had appropriated his variety, the PKV held that they sourced it from him and significantly improved the variety with their scientific inputs. The issue remains unresolved till date. PKV never officially gave Dadaji his credit in its varietal release proposal.

The National Innovation Foundation (NIF) recognised his work in 2003-04 and the Maharashtra government gave him the Krishi Bhushan and Krishi Ratna awards for his innovations. One of his varieties called Chinnour is akin to the Basmati of the north. He named his latest variety after himself: DRK.

Over two decades, Khobragade bred at least nine rice varieties tailored to local needs, including Nanded Chinur (1987), Nanded 92 (1992), Nanded Heera (1994), Vijay Nanded (1996, yielding up to 25 bags per acre), Deepak Ratna (1997), DRK (1998, named after himself), Katey HMT (2002), and DRK Sugandhi (2003, mildly scented).

His innovations earned him over 100 awards, including the President's award from A. P. J. Abdul Kalam, a 2010 Forbes listing among powerful rural entrepreneurs, the third National Grassroots Innovation Award from the National Innovation Foundation in 2005, the first Richharia Award, and recognition from local authorities like the Nanded Gram Panchayat in 1993.

In 2012, HMT and DRK were registered under the Protection of Plant Varieties and Farmers’ Rights Authority as Dadaji HMT, with rights transferred to the NIF for Rs. 1 lakh, and he became a founding member of the Bharat Beej Swaraj Manch to advocate for seed sovereignty.

Khobragade's legacy is marked by controversy, as the Panjabrao Krishi Vidyapeeth university took his HMT seeds in 1994, "purified" them, and released PKV-HMT in the late 1990s without crediting him, leading to widespread media criticism of institutional disregard for farmer innovators. Similarly, his DRK variety was renamed Jai Sriram by the university Despite such setbacks and personal struggles—including selling land for his ill son's medical expenses and dying unable to pay his own hospital bills—his work empowered marginalized farmers and highlighted the value of informal, community-driven agricultural research.

== Awards ==
- First Richharia award for developing HMT and other paddy varieties.
- 2005: Vasantrao Naik Krishibhushan Award.
- 2005: National award for HMT paddy variety at third National Grassroots Innovation Awards.
- 2009: Diffusion award for DRK paddy variety at fifth National Grassroots Innovation Awards.
- 2010: Dr. Panjabrao Deshmukh Krishiratna award by Government of Maharashtra.

== Notes and references ==
- Kakoty, Sanjeeb (2013). "Appropriate technology movement". Strategies for Sustainable Technologies and Innovations. pp. 125–126. ISBN 9781781006832.
- Cox, Stan (2013). Any Way You Slice It. New Press. pp. 161–162. ISBN 9781595588098.

External videos
- https://vimeo.com/127400150
