= Jairaj Phatak =

- Education: IIT Bombay

Jairaj Moreshwar Phatak, an IAS officer of 1978 batch, served as the 25th municipal commissioner of the Brihanmumbai Municipal Corporation (BMC), India from May 2007 to October 2009. He succeeded Johny Joseph as the Municipal Commissioner of Mumbai in May 2007. Currently, he is in the governing council as Director-General and Secretary of All India Institute of Local Self-Government

== Early life and education ==
He graduated with an M.Sc. from IIT Bombay. He later obtained a postgraduate degree from Harvard University. He obtained a doctorate from the University of Mumbai in 2004.

== Career ==
Earlier, he served as the Principal Secretary in Urban Development department of Maharashtra Government. During his tenure as Secretary, school education department was lauded for the efforts he undertook to improve welfare of students.

Phatak was posted, as a Collector Nagpur, Municipal Commissioner, Mumbai or managing director of the rural electrification corporation, Mr. Phatak retired from service on 31 March 2015 after more than three and a half decades.

Earlier Maharashtra government had suspended IAS officers Jairaj Phatak and Pradeep Vyas for their alleged involvement in the Adarsh housing society scam. He was accused of illegally approving apartment constructions in exchange for kickbacks including getting a flat illegally allocated for his son. These flats were originally meant for war widows. The case continues.
