= Devyani Khobragade =

Indian central civil servant

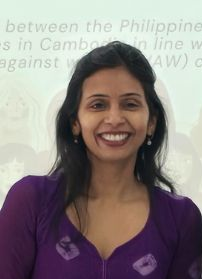
- Born: 25 May 1974 (age 52); Tarapur, Maharashtra, India
- Occupation: Central Civil Servant of Indian Foreign Service cadre
- Years active: 1999–2025
- Employer: Government of India
- Organization: Ministry of External Affairs (India)
- Parent: Uttam Khobragade (father)

Devyani Khobragade is a central civil servant of Indian Foreign Service cadre. She was in the news after being charged with visa fraud when she was posted in the Indian Consul in New York City in the United States. Currently she is serving as the Ambassador of India to Tunisia. She was previously serving as ambassador of India to Cambodia at Embassy of India, Phnom Penh.

== Early life ==
Khobragade was born May 25, 1974 in Tarapur, Maharashtra, in a Buddhist family from Gadchiroli, Maharashtra. Khobragade's father, Uttam Khobragade, was an officer in the Indian Administrative Service. He was also implicated in a number of corruption scandals.

She attended Mount Carmel High School in Mumbai. She obtained a degree in medicine from King Edward Memorial Hospital and Seth Gordhandas Sunderdas Medical College.

== Career ==
Khobragade joined the Indian Foreign Service in 1999. In 2012, she was posted to the Consulate General of India in New York where she worked as Deputy Consul General till December 2013. She handled women's affairs as well as political and economic issues. As acting Consul General, she provided her personal perspective on Women's Rights and the Influence of Demographics in India at the Australian Consulate-General in New York in April 2013.

On 20 January 2014 she was posted to New Delhi as director of the Development Partnership Administration (DPA), an agency formed in 2013 at the Ministry of External Affairs to handle India's projects overseas. In December 2014 the Ministry of External Affairs removed her from this post and placed her on "compulsory wait". In July 2015 she was reinstated as a director in the Ministry of External Affairs, this time in its State Governments division. She chose to work with Kerala, aiming to promote its interests overseas in areas like investment, culture, tourism and the well-being of its large diaspora in the Gulf countries.

Khobragade was selected for the Chevening Rolls-Royce scholarship in 2012.

She was Ambassador to Cambodia from 2 October 2020 to January 2025.

== Personal life ==
Khobragade is married to an American citizen, Aakash Singh Rathore, who is research professor at University of Luiss, Rome, Italy. Since Rathore is a foreign national married to an Indian diplomat, he has applied for Indian citizenship which has not yet been granted since he has not completed the required domicile period in India.

The couple have two daughters, who were ages 7 and 4 in 2013. Khobragade's father, Uttam, was an officer in the Indian Administrative Service.

== Controversies ==
Besides the Devyani Khobragade incident, her name is mostly in news with her father Uttam Khobragade for Adarsh Housing Society scam.

=== United States visa fraud ===
On 12 December 2013, Devyani Khobragade, India's Deputy Consul General at its diplomatic mission in New York City at that time, was arrested on charges of visa fraud and perjury under Title 18, United States Code, Section 1546. This incident led to a major diplomatic standoff between India and the United States.

=== Adarsh Housing Society scam ===
Devyani Khobragade and her father Uttam Khobragade owned a flat in the Adarsh Housing Society. A government investigation and subsequent media coverage described false statements that she made to acquire the flat, as part of the Adarsh Housing Society scam.

=== Undue favours in her postings ===
There is a clear finding by the Supreme Court of India that Ms. Devyani Khobragade was given a posting of her choice in the Indian Foreign Service by bending and modifying the specific rules of allocation for the specific year of 1999 where she was ranked lower than a meritorious batch mate of hers, Mr. Mahaveer C Singhvi. The finding appears in the judgment of the Supreme Court of India in a case filed by the victim batch mate against the vendetta activities of the Ministry of External Affairs effecting his service in the case of Union of India v Mahaveer C Singhvi. The Supreme Court of India in its Judgment stated "The mode of allotment was amended for the 1999 Batch in such a calculated fashion that Ms. Khobragade, who was at Serial No.7, was given her choice of German over and above the Respondent who was graded at two stages above her."

=== Children's dual citizenship ===
After her return to India in December was asked to deposit her children's passports with the Ministry of External Affairs. It was at this time Khobragade revealed that her children had passports from two countries, India and the United States. The ministry instated a panel headed by the Ministry's Joint Secretary of Cypher, NGO and Vigilance (CNV), A.K. Chatterjee to determine whether she had violated Central Civil Services Conduct rules. After a nine-month enquiry, the panel ruled against her and found her guilty of "serious misconduct". In another administrative action, the ministry revoked the children's Indian passports. Khobragade filed a petition in Delhi High Court against this action, arguing that though Indian law forbids dual citizenship, it is permitted for minors. Legal opinion holds that though minors born abroad are allowed to hold dual citizenship once they reach the age of majority (18 years), they have 6 months in which to decide which citizenship to go with. If they fail to make the decision within that timeframe, they automatically lose Indian citizenship. It is unclear, however, whether it is legal for minors to hold both a foreign passport and an Indian passport. In May 2015, Justice Shakdher of the Delhi High Court put a hold on revoking the passports and asked the Ministry of External Affairs to explain to the court why it took this administrative action.

In a legal response to the Delhi High Court, the Ministry of External Affairs claimed that Khobragade obtained these passports for her children in violation of Indian law and without informing the ministry, thus raising questions about her "trustworthiness and integrity". The ministry claimed that Khobragade obtained Indian diplomatic passports for her daughters by "suppressing material facts" which established that she "wilfully and blatantly violated the Indian Passport Act". The ministry rejected Khobragade's petition for dual citizenship on the grounds that it is only applicable to those children who were born outside India. As Khobragade's children were born in India they do not qualify for dual citizenship according to interpretation of MHA. By acquiring US passports, the children had acquired US citizenship and would require a visa to travel to India, which the ministry would be willing to grant should the need arise.

== Other ==
In 2016, she published a book, The White Sari.
