= Uttam Khobragade =

Indian civil servant (born 1951)

Uttam Patruji Khobragade
- Born: 8 May 1951 (age 74); Mumbai, Maharashtra, India
- Occupation(s): Indian Administrative Service Officer, Politician
- Years active: 1984 – 2011
- Spouse: Manda Uttam Khobragade
- Children: Devyani Khobragade; Sharmistha Khobragade

Uttam Khobragade is a senior retired officer of the Indian Administrative Service and father of Indian Diplomat Devyani Khobragade.

== Early life ==
Khobragade was born on 8 May 1951 in Gadchiroli, Maharashtra.

== Career ==
Khobragade qualified to become an officer of the Indian Administrative Service of the 1984 batch. From 1 August 1986 to 1 December 1993 he served in the departments of Land Revenue Management and Rural Development. After that, he was Collector and District Magistrate of Mumbai Suburban District up to 1 July 1996. He subsequently worked in various departments such as Planning and Program Implementation, Environment and Forests, Social Justice and Empowerment, and Rural Development. From 1 October 1998 to 18 October 2000 he was Managing Director of Maharashtra Agricultural and Food Processing Corporation (MAFCO).It was he who closed MAFCO .Khobragade was CEO of Maharashtra Housing and Area Development Authority from 18 October 2000 until he was transferred out of this position on 1 August 2002.From 1 August 2002 to 16 July 2004, he was Commissioner of Food and Drug Administration, Maharashtra State. On 16 July 2004, he returned to Maharashtra Housing and Area Development Authority as its Vice President and CEO. On 25 May 2005 he was assigned position as Vice-Chairman and Managing Director of Maharashtra State Road Transport Corporation.In 2006, he served as Principal Secretary, Animal Husbandry and Dairy Development, Government of Maharashtra. From 28 June 2006 to 2 June 2010 he was General Manager of Brihanmumbai Electric Supply and Transport (BEST). From 2 June 2010 to 31 May 2011 he served as Principal Secretary, Tribal Welfare Department.
