= Ministry of Textiles (Maharashtra) =

Government ministry in Maharashtra

Ministry of Textiles Government of Maharashtra
- मंत्रालय वस्त्रोद्योग विभाग, महाराष्ट्र शासन
- Seal of the state of Maharashtra

- Building of Administrative Headquarters of Mumbai

Ministry overview
- Jurisdiction: (India) Maharashtra
- Headquarters: Mantralay, Mumbai
- Minister responsible: Sanjay Savkare, Cabinet Minister
- Deputy Minister responsible: Vacant, TBD since 29 June 2022, Minister of State
- Parent department: Government of Maharashtra
- Website: mahatextile.maharashtra.gov.in

The Ministry of Textiles is a ministry in the Government of Maharashtra. It is responsible for the promotion of the textile industry in Maharashtra.

The Ministry is headed by a cabinet level minister. Sanjay Savkare is current Minister of Textiles. The Cabinet Minister is assisted by the Minister of State.

== Head office ==
Minister of Textiles मंत्री वस्त्रोद्योग विभाग
- Emblem of India

- Flag of India
- Incumbent; Sanjay Savkare since 21 December 2024
- Ministry of Textiles (Maharashtra)
- Style: The Honourable
- Abbreviation: Cabinet Minister
- Member of: State Cabinet
- Reports to: Chief Minister, Maharashtra Legislature
- Seat: Mantralaya, Mumbai
- Appointer: Governor on the advice of the Chief Minister
- Term length: 5 years
- Precursor: Devendra Fadnavis; (2024- 2024)
- Inaugural holder: Marotrao Kannamwar; (1960-1962)
- Formation: 1 May 1960
- Deputy: Vacant, TBD; since 29 June 2022

== Cabinet Ministers ==
No.	Portrait	Minister (Constituency)	Term of office			Political party	Ministry	Chief Minister
No.	Portrait	Minister (Constituency)	From	To	Period	Political party	Ministry	Chief Minister
Minister of Textiles
01		Marotrao Kannamwar (MLA for Saoli Constituency No. 73- Chandrapur District) (Legislative Assembly)	01 May 1960	07 March 1962	1 year, 310 days	Indian National Congress	Yashwantrao I	Yashwantrao Chavan
02		Marotrao Kannamwar (MLA for Saoli Constituency No. 73- Chandrapur District) (Legislative Assembly)	08 March 1962	19 November 1962	256 days	Indian National Congress	Yashwantrao II	Yashwantrao Chavan
03		Gopalrao Bajirao Khedkar (MLA for Akot Constituency No. 28- Akola District) (Legislative Assembly)	20 November 1962	24 November 1963	1 year, 4 days	Indian National Congress	Kannamwar l	Marotrao Kannamwar
04		Parashuram Krishnaji Sawant (MLA for Chiplun Constituency No. 265- Ratnagiri District) (Legislative Assembly) (Interim Chief Minister)	25 November 1962	04 December 1963	9 days	Indian National Congress	Sawant	Parashuram Krishnaji Sawant
05		D. S. Palaspagar (MLC for Elected by MLAs Constituency No. 19 - Bhandara District) (Legislative Council)	05 December 1963	01 March 1967	3 years, 86 days	Indian National Congress	Vasantrao I	Vasantrao Naik
06		Shankarrao Chavan (MLA for Bhokar Constituency No. 85- Nanded District) (Legislative Assembly)	01 March 1967	27 October 1969	2 years, 240 days	Indian National Congress	Vasantrao II	Vasantrao Naik
07		Madhukar Dhanaji Chaudhari (MLA for Raver Constituency No. 11- Jalgaon District) (Legislative Assembly)	27 October 1969	13 March 1972	2 years, 138 days	Indian National Congress	Vasantrao II	Vasantrao Naik
08		Vasantrao Patil (MLC for Elected by MLAs Constituency No. 20 - Sangli District) (Legislative Council)	13 March 1972	04 April 1973	1 year, 32 days	Indian National Congress	Vasantrao III	Vasantrao Naik
09		Vasantrao Naik (MLA for Pusad Constituency No. 81- Yavatmal District) (Legislative Assembly) (Chief Minister)	04 April 1973	17 Match; 1974	347 days	Indian National Congress	Vasantrao III	Vasantrao Naik
10		Abdul Rahman Antulay (MLA for Shrivardhan Constituency No. 193- Raigad District) (Legislative Assembly)	17 Match; 1974	21 February 1975	341 days	Indian National Congress	Vasantrao III	Vasantrao Naik
11		Rafiq Zakaria (MLC for Elected by MLAs Constituency No. 16 - Mumbai Suburban District) (Legislative Council)	21 February 1975	16 April 1977	2 years, 54 days	Indian National Congress	Shankarrao I	Shankarrao Chavan
12		Madhukar Dhanaji Chaudhari (MLA for Raver Constituency No. 11- Jalgaon District) (Legislative Assembly)	17 April 1977	07 March 1978	1 year, 324 days	Indian National Congress	Vasantdada I	Vasantdada Patil
13		Jawaharlal Darda (MLC for Elected by MLAs Constituency No. 19 - Yavatmal District) (Legislative Council)	07 March 1978	18 July 1978	133 days	Indian National Congress	Vasantdada II	Vasantdada Patil
14		Hashmukhbhai Upadhaya (MLA for Kandivali Constituency No. 161- Mumbai Suburban District) (Legislative Assembly)	18 July 1978	18 February 1980	1 year, 215 days	Janata Party	Pawar I	Sharad Pawar
15		Nanabhau Yembadwar (MLC for Bhandara - Gondia Local Authorities Constituency No. 14 - Gondia District) (Legislative Council)	09 June 1980	21 January 1982	1 year, 226 days	Indian National Congress	Antulay	Abdul Rahman Antulay
16		Shantaram Gholap (MLA for Murbad Constituency No. 139- Thane District) (Legislative Assembly)	21 January 1982	02 February 1983	1 year, 12 days	Indian National Congress	Bhosale	Babasaheb Bhosale
17		Ramrao Adik (MLC for Elected by MLAs Constituency No. 05 - Ahmednagar District) (Legislative Council) (Deputy Chief Minister)	07 February 1983	05 March 1985	2 years, 26 days	Indian National Congress	Vasantdada III	Vasantdada Patil
18		V. Subramanian (MLA for South Mumbai Constituency No. 121- Mumbai City District) (Legislative Assembly)	12 March 1985	03 June 1985	83 days	Indian National Congress	Vasantdada IV	Vasantdada Patil
19		Sudhakarrao Naik (MLA for Pusad Constituency No. 81- Yavatmal District) (Legislative Assembly)	03 June 1985	12 March 1986	282 days	Indian National Congress	Nilangekar	Shivajirao Patil Nilangekar
20		Vilasrao Deshmukh (MLA for Latur City Constituency No. 235- Latur District) (Legislative Assembly)	12 March 1986	26 June 1988	2 years, 106 days	Indian National Congress	Shankarrao II	Shankarrao Chavan
21		W. R. Sherekar (MLC for Elected by MLAs Constituency No. 22 - Chandrapur District) (Legislative Council)	26 June 1988	03 March 1990	1 year, 250 days	Indian National Congress	Pawar II	Sharad Pawar
22		Narendra Marutrao Kamble (MLC for Elected by Governor Nominated No. 10 - Mumbai City District) (Legislative Council)	03 March 1990	25 January 1991	328 days	Indian National Congress	Pawar III	Sharad Pawar
23		Jawaharlal Darda (MLC for Elected by MLAs Constituency No. 19 - Yavatmal District) (Legislative Council)	25 January 1991	25 June 1991	151 days	Indian National Congress	Pawar III	Sharad Pawar
24		Jawaharlal Darda (MLC for Elected by MLAs Constituency No. 19 - Yavatmal District) (Legislative Council)	25 June 1991	22 February 1993	1 year, 242 days	Indian National Congress	Sudhakarrao	Sudhakarrao Naik
25		Sarawan Parate (MLC for Elected by MLAs Constituency No. 14 - Kolhapur District) (Legislative Council)	06 March 1993	18 November 1994	1 year, 257 days	Indian National Congress	Pawar IV	Sharad Pawar
26		Jaiprakash Mundada (MLA for Basmath Constituency No. 92- Hingoli District (Legislative Assembly)	14 March 1995	01 February 1999	3 years, 324 days	Shiv Sena	Joshi	Manohar Joshi
27		Nitin Gadkari (MLC for Nagpur Graduates Constituency No. 03 - Nagpur District) (Legislative Council)	01 February 1999	11 May 1999	99 days	Bharatiya Janata Party	Rane	Narayan Rane
28		Jaiprakash Mundada (MLA for Basmath Constituency No. 92- Hingoli District (Legislative Assembly)	11 May 1999	17 October 1999	159 days	Shiv Sena	Rane	Narayan Rane
29		Vilasrao Deshmukh (MLA for Latur City Constituency No. 235- Latur District) (Legislative Assembly) (Chief Minister)	19 October 1999	27 October 1999	8 days	Indian National Congress	Deshmukh I	Vilasrao Deshmukh
30		Ranjeet Deshmukh (MLA for Savner Constituency No. 49- Nagpur District) (Legislative Assembly)	27 October 1999	16 January 2003	3 years, 81 days	Indian National Congress	Deshmukh I	Vilasrao Deshmukh
31		Ranjeet Deshmukh (MLA for Savner Constituency No. 49- Nagpur District) (Legislative Assembly)	18 January 2003	01 November 2004	1 year, 295 days	Indian National Congress	Sushilkumar	Sushilkumar Shinde
32		Vilasrao Deshmukh (MLA for Latur City Constituency No. 235- Latur District) (Legislative Assembly) (Chief Minister)	01 November 2004	09 November 2004	8 days	Indian National Congress	Deshmukh II	Vilasrao Deshmukh
33		Ashok Chavan (MLA for Bhokar Constituency No. 85- Nanded District) (Legislative Assembly)	09 November 2004	01 December 2008	4 years, 22 days	Indian National Congress	Deshmukh II	Vilasrao Deshmukh
34		Anees Ahmed (MLA for Nagpur Central Constituency No. 55- Nagpur District (Legislative Assembly)	08 December 2008	06 November 2009	333 days	Indian National Congress	Ashok I	Ashok Chavan
35		Mohammed Arif Naseem Khan (MLA for Chandivali Constituency No. 168- Mumbai Suburban District) (Legislative Assembly)	07 November 2009	10 November 2010	1 year, 3 days	Indian National Congress	Ashok II	Ashok Chavan
36		Mohammed Arif Naseem Khan (MLA for Chandivali Constituency No. 168- Mumbai Suburban District) (Legislative Assembly)	11 November 2010	26 September 2014	3 years, 319 days	Indian National Congress	Prithviraj	Prithviraj Chavan
37		Chandrakant Patil (MLA for Kothrud Constituency No. 210- Pune District) (Legislative Assembly)	31 October 2014	08 July 2016	1 year, 251 days	Bharatiya Janata Party	Fadnavis I	Devendra Fadnavis
38		Subhash Deshmukh (MLA for Solapur South Constituency No. 251- Solapur District (Legislative Assembly)	08 July 2016	16 June 2019	2 years, 343 days	Bharatiya Janata Party	Fadnavis I	Devendra Fadnavis
39		Ram Shinde (MLA for Karjat Jamkhed Constituency No. 127- Ahmednagar District) (Legislative Assembly)	16 June 2019	12 November 2019	149 days	Bharatiya Janata Party	Fadnavis I	Devendra Fadnavis
40		Devendra Fadnavis (MLA for Nagpur South West Constituency No. 52- Nagpur District) (Legislative Assembly) (Chief_Minister); In Charge	23 November 2019	28 November 2019	5 days	Bharatiya Janata Party	Fadnavis II	Devendra Fadnavis
41		Nitin Raut (MLA for Nagpur North Constituency No. 57- Nagpur District) (Legislative Assembly)	28 November 2019	30 December 2019	32 days	Indian National Congress	Thackeray	Uddhav Thackeray
42		Aslam Shaikh (MLA for Malad West Constituency No. 162- Mumbai Suburban District) (Legislative Assembly)	30 December 2019	29 June 2022	2 years, 181 days	Indian National Congress	Thackeray	Uddhav Thackeray
43		Eknath Shinde (MLA for Kopri-Pachpakhadi Constituency No. 147- Thane District) (Legislative Assembly) (Chief Minister); In Charge	30 June 2022	14 August 2022	45 days	Shiv Sena (2022–present)	Eknath	Eknath Shinde
44		Chandrakant Patil (MLA for Kothrud Constituency No. 210- Pune District) (Legislative Assembly)	14 August 2022	26 November 2024	2 years, 135 days	Bharatiya Janata Party	Eknath	Eknath Shinde
45		Devendra Fadnavis (MLA for Nagpur South West Constituency No. 52- Nagpur District) (Legislative Assembly) (Chief_Minister); In Charge	05 December 2024	21 December 2024	16 days	Bharatiya Janata Party	Fadnavis III	Devendra Fadnavis
46		Sanjay Savkare (MLA for Bhusawal Constituency No. 12- Jalgaon District (Legislative Assembly)	21 December 2024	Incumbent	1 year, 281 days	Bharatiya Janata Party	Fadnavis III	Devendra Fadnavis

== Ministers of State ==
No.	Portrait	Deputy Minister (Constituency)	Term of office			Political party	Ministry	Minister	Chief Minister
No.	Portrait	Deputy Minister (Constituency)	From	To	Period	Political party	Ministry	Minister	Chief Minister
Deputy Minister of Textiles
Vacant			23 November 2019	28 November 2019	5 days	NA	Fadnavis II	Devendra Fadnavis	Devendra Fadnavis
01		Rajendra Patil Yadravkar (MLA for Shirol Constituency No. 280- Kolhapur District) (Legislative Assembly)	30 December 2019	27 June 2022	2 years, 179 days	Shiv Sena	Thackeray	Aslam Shaikh	Uddhav Thackeray
02		Prajakt Tanpure (MLA for Rahuri Constituency No. 223- Ahmednagar District) (Legislative Assembly); Additional_Charge	27 June 2022	29 June 2022	2 days	Nationalist Congress Party	Thackeray	Aslam Shaikh	Uddhav Thackeray
Vacant			30 June 2022	26 November 2024	2 years, 149 days	NA	Eknath	Eknath Shinde (2022 - 2022); Chandrakant Patil (2022 – 2024)	Eknath Shinde
Vacant			21 December 2024	incumbent	1 year, 281 days	NA	Fadnavis III	Sanjay Savkare (2024 – Present)	Devendra Fadnavis

== Ministers of Printing Presses (1960 - 1978 ) ==
No.	Portrait	Minister (Constituency)	Term of office			Political party	Ministry	Chief Minister
No.	Portrait	Minister (Constituency)	From	To	Period	Political party	Ministry	Chief Minister
Minister of Printing Presses
01		Sultan. G. Kazi (MLC for Elected by Local Authorities Constituency No. 14 - Ahmednagar District) (Legislative Council)	01 May 1960	07 March 1962	1 year, 310 days	Indian National Congress	Yashwantrao I	Yashwantrao Chavan
02		Shankarrao Chavan (MLA for Bhokar Constituency No. 85- Nanded District) (Legislative Assembly)	08 March 1962	19 November 1962	256 days	Indian National Congress	Yashwantrao II	Yashwantrao Chavan
03		Homi J. H. Taleyarkhan (MLC for Elected by MLAs Constituency No. 22 - Mumbai Suburban District) (Legislative Council)	20 November 1962	24 November 1963	1 year, 4 days	Indian National Congress	Kannamwar l	Marotrao Kannamwar
04		P. K. Sawant (MLA for Chiplun Constituency No. 265- Ratnagiri District) (Legislative Assembly) (Interim Chief Minister)	25 November 1962	04 December 1963	9 days	Indian National Congress	Sawant I	P. K. Sawant
05		Homi J. H. Taleyarkhan (MLC for Elected by MLAs Constituency No. 22 - Mumbai Suburban District) (Legislative Council)	05 December 1963	01 March 1967	3 years, 86 days	Indian National Congress	Vasantrao I	Vasantrao Naik
06		D. S. Palaspagar (MLC for Elected by MLAs Constituency No. 19 - Bhandara District) (Legislative Council)	01 March 1967	27 October 1969	2 years, 240 days	Indian National Congress	Vasantrao II	Vasantrao Naik
07		Gopalrao Bajirao Khedkar (MLA for Akot Constituency No. 28- Akola District) (Legislative Assembly)	27 October 1969	13 March 1972	2 years, 138 days	Indian National Congress	Vasantrao II	Vasantrao Naik
08		M. B. Popat (MLA for Dhobitalao Constituency No. 160- Mumbai City District) (Legislative Assembly)	13 March 1972	17 March 1974	2 years, 4 days	Indian National Congress	Vasantrao III	Vasantrao Naik
09		Shankarrao Chavan (MLA for Bhokar Constituency No. 85- Nanded District) (Legislative Assembly)	17 Match; 1974	21 February 1975	1 year, 323 days	Indian National Congress	Vasantrao III	Vasantrao Naik
10		Narendra Mahipati Tidke (MLA for Savner Constituency No. 49- Nagpur District) (Legislative Assembly)	21 February 1975	16 April 1977	2 years, 54 days	Indian National Congress	Shankarrao I	Shankarrao Chavan
11		Shankarrao Genuji Kolhe (MLA for Shirdi Constituency No. 218- Ahmednagar District) (Legislative Assembly)	17 May 1977	07 March 1978	1 year, 294 days	Indian National Congress	Vasantdada I	Vasantdada Patil
Ending on 7 March 1978

== Textile in Maharashtra ==
In the second half of the 19th century, a large textile industry grew up in the Mumbai city and surrounding towns, operated by Indian entrepreneurs. Simultaneously a labour movement was organized. Starting with the Factory Act of 1881, the state government played an increasingly important role in regulating the industry. The Bombay presidency set up a factory inspection commission in 1884. There were restrictions on the hours of children and women. An important reformer was Mary Carpenter, who wrote factory laws that exemplified Victorian modernization theory of the modern, regulated factory as vehicle of pedagogy and civilizational uplift. Laws provided for compensation for workplace accidents.

The Great Bombay Textile Strike brought changes in textile industry. It was a textile strike called on 18 January 1982 by the mill workers of Mumbai under trade union leader Dutta Samant. The purpose of the strike was to obtain bonus and increase in wages. The majority of the over 80 textile mills in Central Mumbai closed during and after the strike, leaving more than 150,000 workers unemployed. The textile industry in Mumbai has largely disappeared, reducing labour migration after the strikes.

As one of the consequence of the strike, the textile industries in Mumbai shut down and moved to the periphery or to other states as the land became real estate gold mine. Mumbai's functional nature changed from being industrial to commercial.

== Textile parks ==
Maharashtra government is planning to set up 9 textile parks.
