= Orange City LGBT Pride March =

Annual LGBT Pride event in Nagpur, India

Orange City LGBT Pride March or Nagpur Pride Parade is the pride march organised annually in Nagpur, Maharashtra. It was started in the year 2016. It is a festival to honour and celebrate Lesbian, Gay, Bisexual and Transgender people and their supporters.

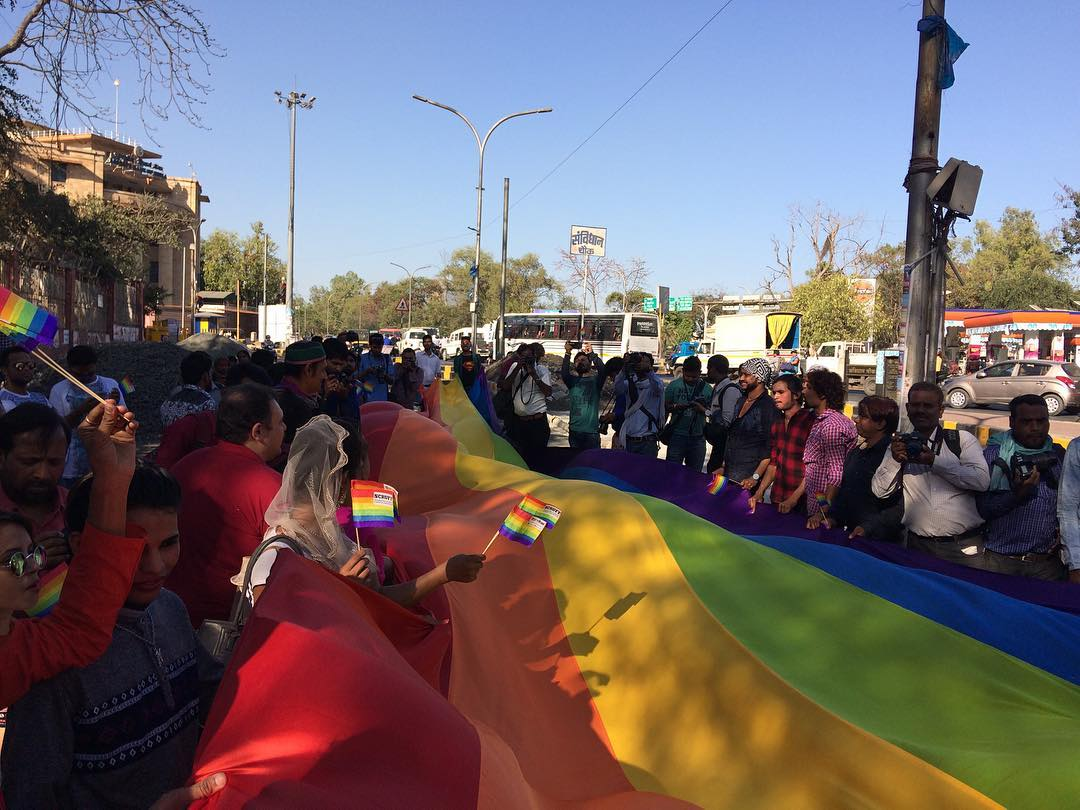
Participants of Orange City LGBT Pride Parade in Nagpur, 2017

== 2016 ==
The first Pride March was conducted on 5 March, 2016; organised by the Sarathi Trust, and supported by organisations like Red Cross Society, YMCA, India Peace Centre, National Council of Churches in India, Maharashtra Andhashraddha Nirmoolan Samiti, Matrusewa Sangh Institute of Social Work, etc. It was flagged off by the BJP MLA Milind Mane in his "personal capacity", who expressed his support, saying that "Every person of any sex should be allowed to choose a partner of their own choice" The march saw the presence of around 400 people including 122 straight supporters. The march commenced from the Samvidhan Square at 3pm, and went to Zero Mile to Variety Square to Jhansi Rani Square to University Library, Canal Road, Ramdaspeth, Lokmat Square to Panchasheel Square to Jhansi Rani Square and back to Samvidhan Square. The ages of the LGBTQ participants ranged between 19–42.

== 2017 ==
The second Orange City Pride March was organised on 18 February by the Orange City Pride March Committee, along with the Sarathi Trust. The parade started from Samvidhan Square, Civil Lines, Nagpur. It was flagged off by Prince Manvendra Singh Gohil, India's first openly gay royal. He also unveiled a calendar by AIDS Healthcare Association (AHF).The march saw a colorful variety of placards and banners, with slogans being raised such as "I’m gay, that’s okay". The march saw attendance by around 300 people.

== 2018 ==
The third Pride march was held on 13 January. The two hour march started from RBI Square towards Zero Mile and Variety Square, crossing Rani Jhansi Square to return to where it started from, the Samvidhan Square. Mr. Nikunj Joshi, the chief executive officer of Sarathi Trust expressed his opinion, saying,"It is necessary to organize this march so that the hidden population of the community is motivated to open themselves and assert its identity." Attending the event a second time, Prince Gohil added, " I like the way the pride is conducted in Nagpur. It is great to see that people who are not a part of the community have also come forward to support." Anand Chandrani, a primary organizer of pride marches in Nagpur, stated that the foremost motive of the third march would be an emphasis on jobs for the members of the community. He said, "We need to train our people in the right kind of skills, upgrade their education to be in sync with the rest of the aspirational youth of the country."

== 2019 ==
The fourth Pride march was held on 16 February. This was the first Pride March organised after consensual same sex sexual acts, that were previously criminalised under the Section 377 of IPC, were decriminalised on 6 September 2018. As a part of pre-pride events, the film Evening Shadows was screened in Nagpur.

== 2020 ==
The fifth Pride march was held on 18 January 2020, from Samvidhan Square. Present during the march were Sarathi trust office bearers Anand Chandrani, Nikunj Joshi, members of LGBTQI community and citizens from Nagpur and cities around.

== 2023 ==
The sixth edition Pride march was held on 7 January 2023, from Samvidhan Square. This event happened after a two year break in 2021 and 2022 due to the COVID-19 pandemic.

== 2024 ==
The seventh edition Pride march was held on 6 January 2024. This event also saw attendees from other cities in Maharashtra and from neighbouring states of Chhattisgarh and Madhya Pradesh. This event was organised by Saarthi Trust in association with Keshav Suri Foundation

== See also ==
- Queer Azaadi Mumbai Pride March
- Pune Pride
- Nagpur LGBT Queer Carnival
