= Buldhana Assembly constituency =

Assembly constituency in Maharashtra

Coordinates: 20.53°N 76.18°E

Buldhana
- Constituency No. 22 for the Maharashtra Legislative Assembly

Constituency details
- Country: India
- Region: Western India
- State: Maharashtra
- District: Buldhana
- Lok Sabha constituency: Buldhana
- Established: 1951
- Total electors: 308,194
- Reservation: None

Member of Legislative Assembly
- 15th Maharashtra Legislative Assembly
- Incumbent Sanjay Gaikwad
- Party: SHS
- Alliance: NDA
- Elected year: 2024

Buldhana Assembly constituency is one of the 288 constituencies of the Maharashtra Vidhan Sabha and one of the seven that are located in Buldhana district.

== Overview ==
It is part of the Buldhana Lok Sabha constituency, along with five other Vidhan Sabha(assembly) constituencies: Chikhali, Sindkhed Raja, Mehkar (SC), Khamgaon and Jalgaon (Jamod),

The seventh constituency, Malkapur from Buldhana district is part of the Raver Lok Sabha constituency from neighbouring Jalgaon district.

As of 2008, the Buldhana constituency comprises the Motala taluka and part of the Buldhana taluka, including the Buldhana Rural and Padali revenue circles, as well as the Buldhana Municipal Council.

== Members of the Legislative Assembly ==
Year	Member	Party
1952	Namdeo Punjaji Pawar	Indian National Congress
1957	Indira Ramrao Kotambkar	Indian National Congress
1962	Indira Ramrao Kotambkar	Indian National Congress
1967	S. S. Patil	Indian National Congress
1972	Ramsingh Deosingh Bhonde	Indian National Congress
1978	Shivajirao Bhiku Patil	Indian National Congress
1980	Sakharam Vithoba Aher	Indian National Congress
1985	Vithalrao Sonaji Patil	Indian National Congress
1990	Rajendra Gode	Shiv Sena
1995	Vijayraj Shinde	Shiv Sena
1999	Drupadrao Sawale Patil	Indian National Congress
2004	Vijayraj Shinde	Shiv Sena
2009	Vijayraj Shinde	Shiv Sena
2014	Harshwardhan Sapkal	Indian National Congress
2019	Sanjay Gaikwad	Shiv Sena
2024	Sanjay Gaikwad	Shiv Sena

== Election results ==
=== Assembly Election 2024 ===
2024 Maharashtra Legislative Assembly election : Buldhana
Party	Candidate	Votes	%	±%
SS	Sanjay Gaikwad	91,660	47.39%	▲9.33
SS(UBT)	Jayshree Sunil Shelke	90,819	46.95%	New
VBA	Prashant Uttam Waghode	7,146	3.69%	▼19.73
NOTA	None of the above	1,354	0.70%	▲0.09
Margin of victory		841	0.43%	▼14.21
Turnout		194,774	63.20%	▲4.66
Total valid votes		193,420		
Registered electors		308,194		▲0.63
SS hold		Swing	▲9.33	

=== Assembly Election 2019 ===
2019 Maharashtra Legislative Assembly election : Buldhana
Party	Candidate	Votes	%	±%
SS	Sanjay Gaikwad	67,785	38.06%	▲17.84
VBA	Vijay Haribhau Shinde	41,710	23.42%	New
INC	Harshwardhan Vasantrao Sapkal	31,316	17.58%	▼11.26
Independent	Yogendra Rajendra Gode	29,943	16.81%	New
AIMIM	Mohammed Sajjad Abdul Khalik	3,792	2.13%	New
BSP	Abdul Rajjak Abdul Sattar	2,914	1.64%	▼0.03
NOTA	None of the above	1,088	0.61%	▼0.02
Margin of victory		26,075	14.64%	▲7.48
Turnout		179,292	58.54%	▼1.56
Total valid votes		178,110		
Registered electors		306,272		▲12.27
SS gain from INC		Swing	▲9.22	

=== Assembly Election 2014 ===
2014 Maharashtra Legislative Assembly election : Buldhana
Party	Candidate	Votes	%	±%
INC	Harshwardhan Vasantrao Sapkal	46,985	28.84%	▼11.96
MNS	Sanjay Rambhau Gaikwad	35,324	21.68%	New
BJP	Gode Yogendra Rajendra	33,237	20.40%	New
SS	Vijayraj Haribhau Shinde	32,946	20.22%	▼26.52
NCP	Naresh Rajaram Shelake	4,387	2.69%	New
BBM	Azhar Sikandar Khan	3,052	1.87%	▲0.83
BSP	Shankarseth Onkar Chaudhary	2,728	1.67%	New
Independent	Prashant Uttam Waghode	1,170	0.72%	New
NOTA	None of the above	1,021	0.63%	New
Margin of victory		11,661	7.16%	▲1.22
Turnout		163,945	60.10%	▼0.10
Total valid votes		162,916		
Registered electors		272,798		▲15.38
INC gain from SS		Swing	▼17.90	

=== Assembly Election 2009 ===
2009 Maharashtra Legislative Assembly election : Buldhana
Party	Candidate	Votes	%	±%
SS	Vijayraj Haribhau Shinde	66,524	46.74%	▲12.85
INC	Dhrupadrao Bhagwan Sawale Patil	58,068	40.80%	▲15.84
SWP	Sonone Shrikrishna Supada	4,449	3.13%	New
Independent	Narkhede Vishwasrao Ramdas	2,795	1.96%	New
AIUDF	Izhaar Ahmad Deshmukh	2,313	1.63%	New
Independent	Sambare Dinkar Tukaram	2,078	1.46%	New
Independent	Gaikwad Dadarao Bansi	1,860	1.31%	New
BBM	Vijayrao Ramkrushnrao Kale	1,475	1.04%	▼0.19
Margin of victory		8,456	5.94%	▼2.99
Turnout		142,333	60.20%	▼10.36
Total valid votes		142,328		
Registered electors		236,442		▲1.74
SS hold		Swing	▲12.85	

=== Assembly Election 2004 ===
2004 Maharashtra Legislative Assembly election : Buldhana
Party	Candidate	Votes	%	±%
SS	Vijayraj Haribhau Shinde	55,546	33.89%	▲6.62
INC	Muktayarsingh Julalsingh More	40,908	24.96%	▼8.02
Independent	Sanjay Gaikwad	32,351	19.74%	New
Independent	Chandak Radheshyam Devkisan (Bhaiji)	14,890	9.09%	New
BSP	Patil Pradip Prataprao	9,419	5.75%	New
Independent	Vijay Ramkrushna Kale	2,996	1.83%	New
BBM	Manik Sopan Pawar	2,014	1.23%	New
Independent	Dabhade Somchandra Sitaram	1,555	0.95%	New
Margin of victory		14,638	8.93%	▲3.22
Turnout		163,969	70.56%	▼1.30
Total valid votes		163,880		
Registered electors		232,397		▲23.63
SS gain from INC		Swing	▲0.91	

=== Assembly Election 1999 ===
1999 Maharashtra Legislative Assembly election : Buldhana
Party	Candidate	Votes	%	±%
INC	Sawale Drupatrao Bhagwanrao	42,079	32.98%	▲5.69
SS	Shinde Vijay Haribhau	34,789	27.27%	▼6.85
Independent	Tekade Sanjaykumar Ramdas	25,829	20.25%	New
NCP	Dr. Gode Rajendra Vyankatrao	18,667	14.63%	New
Independent	Gaikwad Sanjay Rambhau	5,360	4.20%	New
Independent	Khare Muktabai Shamrao	858	0.67%	New
Margin of victory		7,290	5.71%	▼1.12
Turnout		135,087	71.86%	▼7.17
Total valid votes		127,582		
Registered electors		187,980		▲1.33
INC gain from SS		Swing	▼1.14	

=== Assembly Election 1995 ===
1995 Maharashtra Legislative Assembly election : Buldhana
Party	Candidate	Votes	%	±%
SS	Shinde Vijay Haribhau	48,842	34.12%	▼5.21
INC	Gode Dr. Rajendra Vyankatrao	39,069	27.29%	▼11.35
Independent	Tekade Sanjaykumar Ramdas	26,026	18.18%	New
BSP	Gore Ashok Nathuji	6,936	4.85%	New
JD	Bhonde Ramdas Vitthalrao	6,379	4.46%	▼10.82
BBM	Parhad Madhukar Rustumrao	4,988	3.48%	New
Independent	Wankhede Ashok Daulatrao	3,392	2.37%	New
Independent	Mohanlal Mishrilal Sancheti	2,103	1.47%	New
Margin of victory		9,773	6.83%	▲6.13
Turnout		146,599	79.03%	▲10.89
Total valid votes		143,152		
Registered electors		185,509		▲12.89
SS hold		Swing	▼5.21	

=== Assembly Election 1990 ===
1990 Maharashtra Legislative Assembly election : Buldhana
Party	Candidate	Votes	%	±%
SS	Gode Rajendra Vyankatrao	43,244	39.33%	New
INC	Shingane Bhaskarrao Sampatrao	42,478	38.64%	▼4.39
JD	Bhonde Ramdas Vitthal	16,800	15.28%	New
INS(SCS)	Purohit Premsukh Murlidhar	1,930	1.76%	New
Independent	Deshpande Padmakar Ramdas	1,424	1.30%	New
Independent	Kolte Shobha Namdeo	937	0.85%	New
Margin of victory		766	0.70%	▼4.55
Turnout		111,973	68.14%	▲3.46
Total valid votes		109,942		
Registered electors		164,325		▲23.57
SS gain from INC		Swing	▼3.70	

=== Assembly Election 1985 ===
1985 Maharashtra Legislative Assembly election : Buldhana
Party	Candidate	Votes	%	±%
INC	Patil Vithalrao Sonaji	36,277	43.03%	New
IC(S)	Patil Sumanbai Shivajirao	31,850	37.78%	New
Independent	Khillare Pundlik Konduji	7,075	8.39%	New
Independent	More Bapu Jaiwant	5,122	6.08%	New
Independent	Deshmukh Madhukar Sahebrao	1,974	2.34%	New
Independent	Palwe Atmaram Devaji	590	0.70%	New
Independent	Gawande Tarabai Pralhadrao	525	0.62%	New
Margin of victory		4,427	5.25%	▼1.11
Turnout		86,020	64.68%	▼1.03
Total valid votes		84,308		
Registered electors		132,984		▲12.16
INC gain from INC(I)		Swing	▼0.46	

=== Assembly Election 1980 ===
1980 Maharashtra Legislative Assembly election : Buldhana
Party	Candidate	Votes	%	±%
INC(I)	Aher Sakharam Vithoba	33,143	43.49%	▼0.21
INC(U)	Patil Shivajirao Bhiku	28,299	37.13%	New
BJP	Bahekar Keshevrao Jaywantrao	12,561	16.48%	New
Independent	Palwe Atmaram Dewaji	1,234	1.62%	New
Independent	Arjun Totaram Gawai	743	0.97%	New
Margin of victory		4,844	6.36%	▼5.15
Turnout		77,907	65.71%	▼10.64
Total valid votes		76,213		
Registered electors		118,564		▲7.88
INC(I) hold		Swing	▼0.21	

=== Assembly Election 1978 ===
1978 Maharashtra Legislative Assembly election : Buldhana
Party	Candidate	Votes	%	±%
INC(I)	Patil Shivajirao Bhiku	35,503	43.70%	New
Independent	Pawar Atmaram Totaram	26,152	32.19%	New
INC	Bhonde Ramsing Deosing	12,346	15.20%	▼37.35
JP	Gupta Dulichand Munnalal	7,240	8.91%	New
Margin of victory		9,351	11.51%	▼5.11
Turnout		83,914	76.35%	▲12.45
Total valid votes		81,241		
Registered electors		109,901		▲16.73
INC(I) gain from INC		Swing	▼8.85	

=== Assembly Election 1972 ===
1972 Maharashtra Legislative Assembly election : Buldhana
Party	Candidate	Votes	%	±%
INC	Ramsingh Deosingh Bhonde	30,540	52.55%	▲7.67
Independent	Murlidhar Chango Patil	20,878	35.92%	New
RPI	Parve Sadashiv Asaru	3,965	6.82%	▼24.49
INC(O)	Dulichand Munnalal Gupta	1,654	2.85%	New
RPI(K)	Datta Gangaram Hiwale	817	1.41%	New
Margin of victory		9,662	16.62%	▲3.05
Turnout		60,166	63.90%	▼11.62
Total valid votes		58,118		
Registered electors		94,150		▲11.71
INC hold		Swing	▲7.67	

=== Assembly Election 1967 ===
1967 Maharashtra Legislative Assembly election : Buldhana
Party	Candidate	Votes	%	±%
INC	S. S. Patil	27,016	44.88%	▲3.47
RPI	A. V. L. Seth	18,849	31.31%	New
ABJS	D. Z. Warade	13,007	21.61%	New
Independent	B. D. Borde	715	1.19%	New
SWA	R. R. Palaskar	606	1.01%	New
Margin of victory		8,167	13.57%	▼6.38
Turnout		63,647	75.52%	▲5.44
Total valid votes		60,193		
Registered electors		84,277		▲23.75
INC hold		Swing	▲3.47	

=== Assembly Election 1962 ===
1962 Maharashtra Legislative Assembly election : Buldhana
Party	Candidate	Votes	%	±%
INC	Indirabai Ramrao Kotambkar	18,266	41.41%	▼14.41
ABJS	Damodhar Zipra Varhade	9,465	21.46%	New
Independent	Tukaram Shankar Patil	9,196	20.85%	New
RPI	Dharamaji Dagdu Ingle	4,664	10.57%	New
Independent	Prabhakar Dagdu	2,517	5.71%	New
Margin of victory		8,801	19.95%	▼15.71
Turnout		47,729	70.08%	▲7.56
Total valid votes		44,108		
Registered electors		68,103		▲14.77
INC hold		Swing	▼14.41	

=== Assembly Election 1957 ===
1957 Bombay State Legislative Assembly election : Buldhana
Party	Candidate	Votes	%	±%
INC	Indirabai Ramrao Kotambkar	20,708	55.82%	▲10.04
Independent	Ramrao Punjaji	7,480	20.16%	New
ABJS	Vyawhare Ramkrishna Tukaram	6,638	17.89%	▲1.28
ABHM	Pandit Awadhbihari Kalicharan	2,271	6.12%	New
Margin of victory		13,228	35.66%	▲12.38
Turnout		37,097	62.52%	▼2.96
Total valid votes		37,097		
Registered electors		59,340		▲12.59
INC hold		Swing	▲10.04	

=== Assembly Election 1952 ===
1952 Hyderabad State Legislative Assembly election : Buldhana
Party	Candidate	Votes	%	±%
INC	Namdeo Punjaji Pawar	15,797	45.78%	New
Independent	Ramsngh Deosngh Bhonde	7,764	22.50%	New
ABJS	Keshaorao Jaywant Bahekar	5,733	16.61%	New
Independent	Kalu Tukaram Sarkate	2,713	7.86%	New
Socialist	Atmaram Bhimji Pande	2,502	7.25%	New
Margin of victory		8,033	23.28%	
Turnout		34,509	65.48%	
Total valid votes		34,509		
Registered electors		52,705		
INC win (new seat)				

== See also ==
- Buldhana
- Motala
