= Ashish Deshmukh =

Indian politician

Member of Maharashtra Legislative Assembly
- Incumbent
- Assumed office 2024
- Preceded by: Sunil Kedar
- Constituency: Savner
- In office 2014–2019
- Preceded by: Anil Deshmukh
- Succeeded by: Anil Deshmukh
- Constituency: Katol

Personal details
- Born: 8 April 1974 (age 52) Nagpur, Maharashtra, India
- Party: Bharatiya Janata Party (2009-2018) & (2023-Present)
- Other political affiliations: Indian National Congress (2018-2023)
- Spouse: Ayushree Deshmukh
- Children: Hriday & Jigrr
- Parents: Ranjeet Deshmukh (father); Roopa Deshmukh (mother)
- Education: Shri Ramdeobaba College of Engineering and Management
- Occupation: Business and Agriculture Master of Business Administration (MBA) Master of Technology (M.Tech)

Dr. Ashish Ranjeet Deshmukh is the member of the 15th Maharashtra Legislative Assembly. He is representing the Savner Assembly Constituency. He rejoined Bharatiya Janata Party in 2023. Deshmukh is the son of former president of Maharashtra Pradesh Congress Committee and former Maharashtra minister Ranjeet Deshmukh. In December 2013, Deshmukh had undertaken an indefinite fast to press for formation of a separate Vidarbha state.

== Early life ==
Ashish Deshmukh was born to Roopa Deshmukh and Ranjeet Deshmukh, an ex-Cabinet Minister Maharashtra and MLA from Ramtek belongs to Indian National Congress Party.

Deshmukh has authored a book titled Gramvikasacha Password in December 2015.

== Political career ==
He was the Member of 13th Maharashtra Legislative Assembly. He strongly contested assembly elections in 2019 against the then chief minister (Devendra Fadnavis). On 2 October 2018, he became a part of the Indian National Congress. He has been expelled by the grand old party for his statements against party leader Rahul Gandhi and Maharashtra Pradesh Congress Committee (MPCC) President Nana Patole for a period of six years.

In 2023, he returned to Bharatiya Janata Party (BJP) and became BJP OBC Morcha President.

In October 2024, he got ticket offered from BJP for Maharashtra Vidhan Sabha Election 2024 from Savner Kamleshwar Vidhan Sabha Seat against ex-Minister Sunil Kedar's Wife Anuja (Vijaykar) Kedar. On Result Day (i.e. 23 November 2024), Dr. Ashish Deshmukh won the Savner Kalmeshwar Vidhan Sabha Seat by a massive margin of 26,401 votes.

== Associated with ==
- Chairman, No Tobacco Organization
- Founder, YOUTH for INDIA
- Founder Member, Vidarbha Progressive Farmers Association
- Chairman, Arvind Sahakari Bank Ltd.
- Treasurer, Lata Mangeshkar Hospital Trust, Nagpur, Lata Mangeshkar Hospital
- Working president, VSPM Academy of Higher Education, Nagpur
- Treasurer, Madhuribai Deshmukh Seva Pratisthan, Vadvihira, District : Nagpur
- President, Woodball Association of India
- Chairman, International Council for Sports Promotion & Research
- Vice President, Asian woodball association
- Working president, Arvindbabu Deshmukh Pratishthan Journalism Awards

== Author of books ==
- GRAMVIKASACHA PASSWORD. (2017)
- BAAP-MANUS. (2021)
- BHARAT NAVNIRMAN (2024)
- SADE-TOD (2024)

=== Positions held ===
==== Within BJP ====
- MLA since 2014 Katol till 2019

==== Legislative ====
1. Member, Maharashtra Legislative Assembly - 2014 to 2019 2. Member, Maharashtra Legislative Assembly - 2024
