= Maharashtra Pradesh Congress Committee =

Maharashtra affiliate of the Indian National Congress

- Abbreviation: MPCC or Maharashtra PCC
- Leader: Prithviraj Chavan
- President: Harshwardhan Vasantrao Sapkal
- Chairman: Vijay N. Wadettiwar
- Headquarters: Tilak Bhawan, Kaka Saheb Gadgil Marg, Dadar, Mumbai-400025, Maharashtra Gandhi Bhawan, Colaba Causeway, Mumbai-400 005, Maharashtra
- Student wing: Maharashtra NSUI
- Youth wing: Maharashtra Youth Congress
- Women's wing: Maharashtra Pradesh Mahila Congress Committee
- Ideology: Civic nationalism; Social liberalism; Social democracy; Secularism; Economic liberalism
- Political position: Centre
- ECI status: A State Unit of Indian National Congress
- Alliance: Maha Vikas Aghadi
- Seats in Rajya Sabha: 2 / 19
- Seats in Lok Sabha: 13 / 48
- Seats in Maharashtra Legislative Council: 5 / 78
- Seats in Maharashtra Legislative Assembly: 16 / 288

Election symbol

Website
- incmaharashtra.org

The Maharashtra Pradesh Congress Committee (or MPCC) is the state unit of the Indian National Congress for the state of Maharashtra. It is responsible for organizing and coordinating the party's activities and campaigns within the state, as well as selecting candidates for local, state, and national elections in Maharashtra.

== History ==
The Maharashtra was formed on 1 May 1960, and since then its politics have been evolving. The INC was long without a major challenger, and enjoyed overwhelming support from the state's sugar co-operatives and thousands of other cooperative organizations involved in the rural agricultural economy of the state such as marketing of dairy and vegetable produce, credit unions etc. Since 1930s when Keshavrao Jedhe joined the Congress party, the politics of the Bombay state and its successor Maharashtra state has been dominated by the mainly rural Maratha-Kunbi caste. This group dominates the cooperative institutions and with the resultant economic power, control politics from the village level up to the Assembly and Lok Sabha seats. Since 1980s, this group has also been active in setting up private educational institutions. Major past political figures of Congress party from Maharashtra such as Keshavrao Jedhe, Yashwantrao Chavan, Vinayakrao Patil, Vasantdada Patil, Shankarrao Chavan Keshavrao Sonawane and Vilasrao Deshmukh have been from this group. Sharad Pawar, who had been a towering figure in Maharashtrian and national politics belongs to this group. The state's political status quo was upset when Sharad Pawar defected from the INC, which he perceived as the vehicle of the Gandhi dynasty, to form the Nationalist Congress Party. This followed disputes between Pawar and the INC president Sonia Gandhi. This offshoot of the Congress party split the Maratha community support. In the last thirty years, however, Shiv Sena and the BJP began gaining a foothold in the state of Maharashtra, especially in the urban areas such as Mumbai. Shiv Sena and the BJP came into the power in 1995, which was a big blow to the INC. After one term, however, the Congress-NCP alliance regained power and held it until 2014. The INC contested the 2014 state assembly election without getting in a formal alliance with the NCP and lost power to the BJP. The INC won just 16 seats in 2024.

== Maharashtra Legislative Assembly elections ==
Year	Party leader	Change in Seats	Seat won	Outcome
Bombay Presidency
1937	B. G. Kher	▲86	86 / 175 (49%)	Government
1946	B. G. Kher	▲39	125 / 175 (71%)	Government
Bombay State
1952	Morarji Desai	▲94	269 / 315 (85%)	Government
1957	Yashwantrao Chavan	▼35	234 / 396 (59%)	Government
Maharashtra State
1962	Marotrao Kannamwar	▲215	215 / 264 (81%)	Government
1967	Vasantrao Naik	▼12	203 / 270 (75%)	Government
1972	Vasantrao Naik	▲19	222 / 270 (82%)	Government
1978	Vasantdada Patil	▼153	69 / 288 (24%)	Opposition
1980	A. R. Antulay	▲117	186 / 288 (65%)	Government
1985	Shivajirao Patil Nilangekar	▼25	161 / 288 (56%)	Government
1990	Sharad Pawar	▼20	141 / 288 (49%)	Government
1995	Sharad Pawar	▼61	80 / 288 (28%)	Opposition
1999	Vilasrao Deshmukh	▼5	75 / 288 (26%)	Government
2004	Vilasrao Deshmukh	▼6	69 / 288 (24%)	Government
2009	Ashok Chavan	▲13	82 / 288 (28%)	Government
2014	Prithviraj Chavan	▼40	42 / 288 (15%)	Opposition
2019	Balasaheb Thorat	▲2	44 / 288 (15%)	Government later Opposition
2024	Nana Patole	▼28	16 / 288 (6%)	Opposition

Maharashtra Congress Legislative Assembly seat count

== Performance in Maharashtra Lok Sabha elections ==
Lok Sabha Elections
Year	Lok Sabha	Party Leader	Seats contested	Seats won	(+/-) in seats	% of votes	Vote swing	Popular vote	Outcome
1951	1st	Jawaharlal Nehru	44	40 / 45 (89%)	New entry	50.15%	New entry	57,81,277	Government
1957	2nd	Jawaharlal Nehru	66	38 / 66 (58%)	▼2	48.66%		81,56,272	Government
1962	3rd	Jawaharlal Nehru	44	41 / 44 (93%)	▲3	52.89%		58,95,958	Government
1967	4th	Indira Gandhi	45	37 / 45 (82%)	▼4	48.51%		66,18,181	Government
1971	5th	Indira Gandhi	44	42 / 48 (88%)	▲5	63.18%		87,90,135	Government
1977	6th	Indira Gandhi	47	20 / 48 (42%)	▼22	47.02%		79,42,267	Opposition
1980	7th	Indira Gandhi	48	39 / 48 (81%)	▲19	53.30%		98,55,580	Government
1984	8th	Rajiv Gandhi	47	43 / 48 (90%)	▲4	51.24%		1,11,83,424	Government
1989	9th	Rajiv Gandhi	48	28 / 48 (58%)	▼15	45.36%		1,24,96,088	Opposition
1991	10th	P. V. Narasimha Rao	48	38 / 48 (79%)	▲10	48.40%		1,12,80,003	Government
1996	11th	P. V. Narasimha Rao	48	15 / 48 (31%)	▼23	34.78%		98,64,853	Opposition
1998	12th	Sitaram Kesri	41	33 / 48 (69%)	▲18	43.64%		1,37,44,283	Opposition
1999	13th	Sonia Gandhi	42	10 / 48 (21%)	▼23	29.71%		98,12,144	Opposition
2004	14th	Sonia Gandhi	26	13 / 48 (27%)	▲3	23.77%		81,43,246	Government
2009	15th	Manmohan Singh	25	17 / 48 (35%)	▲4	19.61%		72,53,634	Government
2014	16th	Rahul Gandhi	26	4 / 48 (8%)	▼13	18.13%		88,30,190	Opposition
2019	17th	Rahul Gandhi	25	1 / 48 (2%)	▼3	16.27%		87,92,237	Opposition
2024	18th	Mallikarjun Kharge	17	13 / 48 (27%)	▲12	16.92%		96,41,856	Opposition

Maharashtra Congress Lok Sabha seat count

== Status in municipal corporations ==
Municipal Corporation	Seats	Status
Brihanmumbai Municipal Corporation	24 / 227	Opposition
Pune Municipal Corporation	16 / 162	Opposition
Nagpur Municipal Corporation	34 / 151	Opposition
Chandrapur City Municipal Corporation	27 / 66	Opposition
Thane Municipal Corporation	0 / 131	Opposition
Pimpri-Chinchwad Municipal Corporation	0 / 128	Opposition
Nashik Municipal Corporation	3 / 122	Opposition
Solapur Municipal Corporation	1 / 102	Opposition
Amravati Municipal Corporation	21 / 87	Opposition
Ulhasnagar Municipal Corporation	1 / 78	Opposition
Akola Municipal Corporation	19 / 80	Opposition
Jalgaon City Municipal Corporation	0 / 70	Opposition
Ahmednagar Municipal Corporation	0 / 68	Opposition
Navi Mumbai Municipal Corporation	0 / 111	Opposition
Sangli, Miraj and Kupwad City Municipal Corporation	18 / 78	Opposition
Panvel Municipal Corporation	4 / 78	Opposition
Parbhani City Municipal Corporation	12 / 65	Coalition partner
Nanded-Waghala City Municipal Corporation	10 / 81	Opposition
Malegaon Municipal Corporation	3 / 84	Opposition
Dhule Municipal Corporation	6 / 74	Opposition
Latur City Municipal Corporation	43 / 70	Government
Mira-Bhayandar Municipal Corporation	7 / 95	Opposition
Vasai-Virar City Municipal Corporation	1 / 115	Opposition
Bhiwandi-Nizampur City Municipal Corporation	30 / 90	Coalition partner
Kolhapur Municipal Corporation	34 / 81	Opposition

== List of presidents ==
S.no	President	Portrait	Term	
1	Gopalrao Bajirao Khedkar		1960	1963
2	Vinayakrao Patil		1963	1967
3	Vasantdada Patil		1967	1972
4	P. K. Sawant		1972	1978
5	Narendra Tidke		1978	1978
6	Nashikrao Tirpude		1978	1979
7	Ramrao Adik		1979	1980
8	Premala Chavan		1980	1981
9	Gulabrao Patil		1981	1982
10	S M I Asir		1983	1983
11	N. M. Kamble		1983	1985
12	Prabha Rau		1985	1988
13	Pratibha Patil		1988	1989
(11)	N. M. Kamble		1989	1990
14	Sushilkumar Shinde		1990	1991
15	Shivajirao Patil Nilangekar		1991	1992
16	Shivajirao Deshmukh		1992	1993
(14)	Sushilkumar Shinde		1993	1997
17	Ranjeet Deshmukh		1997	1998
18	Prataprao Baburao Bhosale		1998	2000
19	Govindrao Adik		2000	2003
(17)	Ranjeet Deshmukh		2003	2004
(12)	Prabha Rau		2004	2008
20	Patangrao Kadam		2008	2008
21	Manikrao Thakare		2008	2015
22	Ashok Chavan		2015	2019
23	Balasaheb Thorat		2019	2021
24	Nana Patole		5 February 2021	13 February 2025
25	Harshwardhan Vasantrao Sapkal		13 February 2025	Incumbent

== Officeholders ==
President of the Maharashtra Pradesh Congress Committee
- Indian National Congress

- Incumbent; Harshwardhan Sapkal since 13 February 2025
- Indian National Congress
- Style: Mr. President
- Type: Political Party Office
- Residence: Mumbai
- Nominator: Committee consisting of members of the Indian National Congress from the National
- Appointer: National President
- Term length: no term limit
- Constituting instrument: Constitution of the Indian National Congress
- Precursor: Nana Patole
- Formation: 1 May 1960
- First holder: Abasaheb Khedkar (1960-1963)
- Website: www.inc.in

=== President ===
Shri. Harshwardhan Vasantrao Sapkal

=== Political Affairs Committee ===
1. Shri. Ramesh Chennithala - In-Charge - Chairman

2. Shri. Harshwardhan Vasantrao Sapkal

3. Shri. Vijay Namdevrao Wadettiwar

4. Shri. Satej Patil

5. Shri. Mukul Wasnik

6. Shri. Avinash Pandey

7. Shri. Balasaheb Thorat

8. Shri. Sushilkumar Shinde

9. Shri. Prithviraj Chavan

10. Smt. Rajani Ashokrao Patil

11. Shri. Manikrao Thakare

12. Shri. Nana Patole

13. Smt. Varsha Gaikwad

14. Shri. Imran Pratapgarhi

15. Shri. Sunil Chhatrapal Kedar

16. Dr. Nitin Raut

17. Shri. Amit Deshmukh

18. Smt. Yashomati Chandrakant Thakur

19. Shri. Shivajirao Moghe

20. Shri. Chandrakant Handore

21. Shri. Naseem Khan

22. Smt. Praniti Shinde

23. Shri. Muzaffar Hussain

24. Shri. Kagda Chandya Padvi

25. Shri. Aslam Shaikh

26. Shri. Vishwajeet Kadam

27. Shri. Kalyan Kale

28. Prof. Vasant Purke

29. Shri. Amin Patel

30. President, Mahila Congress

31. President, Youth Congress

32. Chief Coordinator, Seva Dal

33. President, National Students' Union of India

34. President, Indian National Trade Union Congress

35. President, SC Department

36. Adv. Ganesh Patil - Convenor

Ex-Officio Members

37. AICC Secretaries, In-charge, Maharashtra

38. AICC Secretaries & Joint Secretaries from Maharashtra

== Treasurer ==
1. Shri. Abhay Chhajed

== Senior vice presidents ==
1. Adv. Abhijit Wanjarri

2. Adv. Ganesh Patil

3. Dr. Sunil Deshmukh

4. Dr. Wajahat Mirza

5. Shri. Anees Ahmed

6. Shri. Gopal Agrawal

7. Shri. Kalyan Kale

8. Shri. Mohan Joshi

9. Shri. Mujaffar Husain

10. Shri. Nana Gawande

11. Shri. Rajendra Mulak

12. Shri. Ramesh Bagave

13. Shri. Ranjit Kamble

14. Shri. Sachin Naik

15. Shri Tukaram Renge Patil

== Vice presidents ==
1. Shri. Anil Patel

2. Shri. Ashok Dhavad

3. Shri. Ashok Garg

4. Shri. Ashok Nilangekar

5. Adv. Asif Shaukat Qureshi

6. Shri. B. I. Nagrale

7. Shri. Balasaheb Shankarrao Deshmukh

8. Shri. Baldev Maharaj Rathod

9. Shri. Harish Bhaiya Pawar

10. Shri. Hidayat Patel

11. Shri. Kalyan Dale

12. Shri. Kamaal Farooqui

13. Shri. Kishor Govindrao Kanhere

14. Shri. Laxman Ghumare

15. Shri. M. M. Shaikh (Ex MLC)

16. Shri. Mirza Ariz Hafiz Beg

17. Shri. Rajaram Pangavhane

18. Shri. Rajan Bhosale

19. Shri. Rajendra Rakh

20. Shri. Rajesh Sharma

21. Shri. Ramchandra (Aaba) Dharmaji Dalvi

22. Shri. Ramesh Shetty

23. Shri. Ramhari G. Rupanwar (Ex MLC)

24. Smt. Rani Agrawal

25. Adv. Sandeep Suresh Patil

26. Smt. Sandhya Sawwalakhe

27. Shri. Sanjay Rathod

28. Shri. Sharad Aher

29. Shri. Siddhartha Hattiambire

30. Shri. Suresh Bhoyar

31. Shri. Suresh Taware (Ex MP)

32. Smt. Takshashila Wagdhare

33. Shri. Virendra Jagtap (Ex MLA)

34. Shri. Vishal Muttemwar

35. Shri. Yogendra Patil

36. Dr. Zeeshan Husain

== Senior spokespersons ==
1. Shri. Anant Gadgil

2. Shri. Atul Londhe

3. Shri. Dhiraj Deshmukh

4. Shri. Gopal Tiwari

5. Shri. Sachin Sawant

== General Secretaries ==
1. Shri. Abhijit

2. Shri. Abid Khan

3. Shri. Aditya Ashokrao Patil

4. Shri. Ajay Ramayyaji Kankdalwar

5. Shri. Amar Khanapure

6. Adv. Amit A. Karande

7. Shri. Amir Sheikh

8. Shri. Anant Vishwanath Mohod

9. Shri. Anis Qureshi

10. Dr. Archana Patil

11. Shri. Ashokrao Bobade

12. Shri. Atul Kotecha

13. Shri. Satish Manoharrao Warujkar

14. Shri. Babu Nair

15. Adv. Bhausaheb Ajabe

16. Shri. Bhanudas Mali

17. Smt. Bhavana Jain

18. Shri. Brijkishor Dutt

19. Shri. Dadasaheb Maruti Munde

20. Dr. Darbarsing Girase

21. Shri. Dhanajay Shinde

22. Shri. Dhananjay Shirish Chaudhary

23. Adv. Dileep Edatkar

24. Shri. Dileep Sarnaik

25. Dr. Dinesh Fakirchand Kambale

26. Dr. Dinesh Yashwantrao Nikhate

27. Smt. Dipti Chaudhari (Ex Mayor, Ex MLC)

28. Shri. Domnic D'mello

29. Shri Girish Pandav

30. Shri. Gurbindersingh Bachher

31. Shri. Haider Ali Dosani

32. Shri. Haribhau Mohad

33. Shri. Harishchandra Chimaji Thorat

34. Shri. Hemant Ogale (MLA)

35. Smt. Husnabanu Khalife (Ex MLC)

36. Dr. Jitendra Dehade

37. Shri. Jojo Thomas

38. Shri. Karan Jayant Sasane

39. Shri. Ketan Vikas Thakre

40. Shri. Kishor Borkar

41. Shri. Kunal Raut

42. Smt. Kunda Raut

43. Shri. Lahu Hanumantrao Shewale

44. Shri. Madhu Mohite

45. Smt. Madhuri Aade

46. Shri. Mahesh Gangane

47. Shri. Manish Somnath Ganore

48. Shri. Manoj Kambale

49. Shri. Milind Chimote

50. Shri. Milind Padgaonkar

51. Shri. Mohan Deshmukh

52. Smt. Monica Jagtap

53. Shri. Mrunal Patil

54. Shri. Mufti Harun Nadvi

55. Shri. Mujahid Khan

56. Shri. Munna Bandu Kurane

57. Dr. Nadeem

58. Smt. Nanda Mhatre

59. Smt. Nanda Parate

60. Shri. Nandakumar Sarjerao Kumbhar

61. Adv. Navin Singh

62. Dr. Noor Ansari

63. Smt. Prabhavati Janardhan Ghogare

64. Shri. Pradeep (Pappu) Ranka

65. Shri. Prakash Sonavane

66. Shri. Prasanna Baburao Tidke

67. Shri. Rajendra Shelar

68. Shri. Rajesh Rathod (MLC)

69. Shri. Ramesh Keer

70. Shri. Ramvijay Burungale

71. Adv. Ravi Prakash Jadhav

72. Shri. Ravindra Darekar

73. Smt. Rekha Dattatraya Chavan

74. Shri. Sadanand Shetty

75. Shri. Sahebrao Kamble

76. Shri. Sainath Chavan

77. Adv. Sandeep Davhale Patil

78. Shri. Sandesh Kondvilkar

79. Shri. Sandesh Singalkar

80. Shri. Sanjay Balgude

81. Shri. Sanjay Dube

82. Shri. Santosh Singh Chandan Singh Rawat

83. Shri. Sayed Zeeshan Ahmed

84. Shri. Shah Alam

85. Shri. Shakur Nagani

86. Shri. Sham Umalkar

87. Shri Shashank Bawachakar

88. Shri. Shiva Rao Polisetti

89. Adv. Shraddha Thakur

90. Dr. Sharavan Govindrao Rapanwad

91. Shri. Shrikrishana Sangale

92. Shri. Shrirang Barge

93. Shri. Shrirang Eknath Chavan

94. Shri. Sunil Malke

95. Adv. Surendra Ghodajkar

96. Shri. Suryakant Baburao Patil Budhihalkar

97. Shri. Taufik Mulani

98. Shri. Umakant Agnihotri

99. Shri. Yadnyawalk Jichkar

100. Shri Yashraj Parkhi

101. Shri. Yogesh Shankar Nam

102. Shri. Yuvraj Karankal

103. Shri. Zakir Ahmed

104. Shri Ziya Patel

105. Adv. Shekhar Shetty

106. Shri. Aravind Kolte

107. Dr. Shivanand Hulyalkar

== Secretaries ==
1. Shri. Aanand Mainbhadur Singh

2. Shri. Abhyuday Meghe

3. Dr. Aishwari Rathod

4. Shri. Akash More

5. Shri. Akshay Raut

6. Shri. Ashok Rohidas Dolas

7. Shri. Asif Tawakel

8. Smt. Avantika Lekurwale

9. Shri. Baliram Dhole

10. Shri. Bandu Dhotre

11. Adv. Carina Sharon Xavier

12. Shri. Chandrakant Sathe

13. Shri. Chhagan Khatke Patil

49. Shri. Al Naseer Zakaria

89. Shri. Vishwajit Happe

90. Shri. Vishwajit Marotrao Kowase

91. Shri. Pradeep Ram Rao

92. Smt. Vidya Shashikant Patil

93. Shri. Surendra Adhav

94. Shri. Harish Rawal

95. Shri. Ashok Ganpatrao More

== Media coordinator ==
1. Shri. Shrinivas Bhikkad

== Executive Committee ==
1. Harshwardhan Vasantrao Sapkal

2. Shri. Mukul Wasnik

3. Shri. Avinash Pandey

4. Shri. Vijay Namdevrao Wadettiwar

5. Shri. Satej Patil

6. Shri. Amin Patel

7. Shri. Balasaheb Thorat

8. Shri Prithviraj Chavan

9. Shri. Sushilkumar Shinde

10. Shri. Manikrao Thakare

11. Smt. Rajani Ashokrao Patil

85. Shri. Suresh Shetty

86. Shri. Madhu Chavan

87. Shri. Munaf Hakim

=== Various committees ===
Screening Committee, Election Coordination Committee, Election Committee, Election Management Committee, Campaign Committee, Media Coordination Committee, Publicity Committee, Manifesto Committee, Finance Committee are constituted and Observers are appointed during Assembly and Parliament elections. Subject Committees may be constituted on various issues and matters.

=== Delegates ===
The MPCC has 553 PCC delegates & 100 AICC delegates, while the MRCC has 236 PCC delegates & 43 AICC delegates.

== Frontal organisations ==
=== Maharashtra Pradesh Congress Sevadal ===
- Shri. Vilas Autade, Chief Organizer.

=== Maharashtra Pradesh Mahila Congress ===
- Smt. Sandhaya Sawwalakhe, President.

=== Maharashtra Pradesh Youth Congress ===
- Shri. Shivraj More, President,

=== Maharashtra Pradesh National Students Union of India ===
- Shri. Sagar Salunkhe, President.

=== Maharashtra Pradesh Indian National Trade Union Congress ===
- Shri. Prakash Hirachand Mutha, President

== Departments and cells ==
=== Maharashtra Pradesh Congress SC Department ===
Shri. Siddhartha Hattiambire, President.

=== Maharashtra Pradesh Congress ST Department ===
Shri. Vasant Purke, President

=== Maharashtra Pradesh Congress OBC Department ===
- Dr. Yashpal Bhinge, President.

=== Maharashtra Pradesh Congress Minority Department ===
Dr. Wajahat Mirza, President.

== List of chief ministers of Maharashtra from the Congress Party ==
#	Name	Took office	Left office
1	Yashwantrao Chavan	1 November 1956	19 November 1962
1962 Maharashtra Legislative Assembly election
2	Marotrao Kannamwar	20 November 1962	24 November 1963
3	Vasantrao Naik	5 December 1963	20 February 1975
4	Shankarrao Chavan	21 February 1975	17 May 1977
5	Vasantdada Patil	17 May. 1977	7 March 1978
1980 Maharashtra Legislative Assembly election
7	A. R. Antulay	9 June 1980	12 January 1982
8	Babasaheb Bhosale	21 January 1982	1 February 1983
9	Vasantdada Patil (3rd Term)	2 February 1983	1 June 1985
1985 Maharashtra Legislative Assembly election
10	Shivajirao Patil Nilangekar	3 June 1985	6 March 1986
11	Shankarrao Chavan	12 March 1986	26 June 1988
12	Sharad Pawar (2nd Term)	26 June 1988	25 June 1991
9th Assembly Elections (1991)
13	Sudhakarrao Naik	25 June 1991	22 February 1993
14	Sharad Pawar (3rd Term)	6 March 1993	14 March 1995
1999 Maharashtra Legislative Assembly election
15	Vilasrao Deshmukh (1st Term)	18 October 1999	16 January 2003
16	Sushilkumar Shinde	18 January 2003	30 October 2004
2004 Maharashtra Legislative Assembly election
19	Vilasrao Deshmukh (2nd Term)	1 November 2004	4 December 2008
20	Ashok Chavan	8 December 2008	5 November 2010
21	Prithviraj Chavan	6 November 2010	25 September 2014

== Performance in state elections ==
Year	General election	Votes polled (%)	Seats won
1962	3rd Assembly	56,17,347	215
1962	3rd Lok Sabha	58,95,958	41
1967	4th Assembly	62,88,564	203
1967	4th Lok Sabha	66,18,181	37
1971	5th Lok Sabha	87,90,135	42
1972	5th Assembly	85,35,832	222
1977	6th Lok Sabha	79,42,267	20
1978	6th Assembly	51,59,828	69
1980	7th Assembly	78,09,533	186
1980	7th Lok Sabha	98,55,580	39
1984	8th Lok Sabha	1,11,83,424	43
1985	8th Assembly	95,22,556	161
1989	9th Lok Sabha	1,24,96,088 (45.36%)	28
1990	9th Assembly	1,13,34,773 (38.17%)	141
1991	10th Lok Sabha	1,12,80,003 (48.4%)	38
1995	10th Assembly	1,19,41,832 (31%)	80
1996	11th Lok Sabha	98,64,853 (34.78%)	15
1998	12th Lok Sabha	1,37,44,283 (43.64%)	33
1999	13th Lok Sabha	98,12,144 (29.71%)	10
1999	11th Assembly	89,37,043 (27.20%)	75
2004	14th Lok Sabha	81,43,246 (23.77%)	13
2004	12th Assembly	88,10,363 (21.06%)	69
2009	15th Lok Sabha	72,53,634 (19.61%)	17
2009	13th Assembly	95,21,703 (21.01%)	82
2014	16th Lok Sabha	88,30,190 (18.29%)	2
2014	14th Assembly	94,96,095 (17.95%)	42
2019	17th Lok Sabha	87,92,237 (16.41%)	1
2019	15th Assembly	87,52,199 (15.87%)	44
2024	18th Lok Sabha	96,41,856 (16.92%)	14
2024	16th Assembly	80,20,921 (12.42%)	16

== See also ==
- All India Congress Committee
- Congress Working Committee
- Indian National Congress
- Politics of Maharashtra
- Pradesh Congress Committee

== General sources ==
- News Network of India
