= Ranjeet Deshmukh =

Indian politician

Member of Maharashtra Legislative Assembly
- In office 1985–1995
- Preceded by: Naik Ramji Chiman
- Succeeded by: Sunil Chhatrapal Kedar
- Constituency: Savner

Member of Maharashtra Legislative Council
- In office (1995-1998), (1998 – 2004)
- Constituency: Elected by MLA's

Leader of The House Maharashtra Legislative Council
- In office 18 Jan 2003 – 23 Dec 2003
- Chief Minister: Sushilkumar Shinde
- Chairman of the House: N. S. Pharande

President of Maharashtra Pradesh Congress Committee
- In office (1997-1998), (2003 – 2004)
- Preceded by: Sushilkumar Shinde
- Succeeded by: Prabha Rau

Cabinet Minister in Fourth Pawar ministry Government of Maharashtra
- In office 6 March 1993 – 14 March 1995
- Minister: Rural Development; Employment Guarantee; Ex. Servicemen welfare

Cabinet Minister in First Deshmukh ministry Government of Maharashtra
- In office 18 Oct 1999 – 16 Jan 2003
- Minister: Agriculture; Textiles; Khar land development

Cabinet Minister in Shinde ministry Government of Maharashtra
- In office 27 Jan 2003 – 19 Oct 2004
- Minister: Rural Development; Textiles; Marketing; Woman and Child development

Personal details
- Born: 29 May 1946 (age 80) Wadvihira, Central Provinces and Berar, British India
- Party: Indian National Congress
- Spouse: Smt.Roopa Deshmukh
- Children: Ashish Deshmukh & Amol Deshmukh
- Education: Graduate Professional B.E. (MECHANICAL) MYSORE UNIVERSITY, MANIPAL YEAR- 1970
- Website: nkpsims.edu.in afalindia.com

Ranjeet Arvindbabu Deshmukh is an Indian politician and Senior Congress leader. He held the position as state unit president of the party on two occasions was the president of Maharashtra Pradesh Congress Committee (MPCC). He was first elected to the MLA in 1985 from the Savner constituency.

== Political career ==
Ranjeet Deshmukh, joined politics in the 1970. He was a youth leader and the head of the youth congress of the Indian National Congress who worked very closely with Sanjay Gandhi. He was first elected as an MLA from Ramtek constituency Maharashtra. In the 1990s he was involved in the movement for a separate statehood for Vidarbha. Ranjeet Deshmukh considered 'chief minister material' for Maharashtra. He was in the reckoning but party colleague Vilasrao Deshmukh got the post Later, he fell out with the Congress leadership over granting of statehood to Vidarbha. Ranjeet Deshmukh held several Cabinet portfolios right from rural development in which he made significant contribution pioneering village cleanliness drives, to education, technical education, health, agriculture and textiles. He was in the Congress-led governments in the state for almost two decades. He had love-hate relationship with former CM late Vilasrao Deshmukh. In 2004 he unsuccessfully contested from Nagpur West Assembly seat and was defeated by former Maharashtra CM Devendra Fadnavis of the BJP. He was a two-term president of Maharashtra Pradesh Congress Committee and ex-minister. Ranjit Deshmukh was seeking a desperate comeback into the Congress mainstream. His 65th birthday celebrations provided an occasion. His old associates organized a function which looked more like a Congress event. The organizing committee of over 150 Congressmen was headed by district guardian minister Shivajirao Moghe and had two ministers from the city Nitin Raut and Rajendra Mulak. In 2014 he quit the Indian National Congress because of poor functioning" of the organisation.

== Personal life ==
Ranjeet Deshmukh is married to Mrs.Roopa Deshmukh and has 2 children: Ashish Deshmukh and Dr. Amol Deshmukh. His elder son Ashish Deshmukh was elected as an MLA in the 2014 Maharashtra Assembly Election. He represents the Katol Assembly Constituency. He belonged to the Bharatiya Janata Party 2014. His younger son Dr. Amol Deshmukh fought the 2014 Assembly Election on a Nationalist Congress Party ticket. In 2002 along with Chikki Panday he founded the 'Akshara Foundation of Arts & Learning' which works towards providing education to under privileged children. In the year 1990 Ranjeet Deshmukh also founded the NKP Salve Institute of Medical Sciences, now a leading name in private medical education.

== Positions held ==
- Elected MLA Maharashtra Legislative Assembly 1985 from the Savner constituency
- Two terms MPCC president Maharashtra Pradesh Congress Committee
- Two terms MLC Maharashtra Legislative Council
