= Pune Pride =

Annual LGBT event in Pune, India

- Frequency: Annual
- Locations: Pune, Maharashtra, India
- Inaugurated: 11 December 2011
- Organizer: Samapathik Trust

Pune Pride is an annual LGBT pride parade that was first held in Pune, Maharashtra on 11 December 2011. It is the second Pride parade to be organized in the state of Maharashtra, after the Queer Azaadi Mumbai Pride March.

== History of Pune Pride Parade ==
The city saw its first pride march also known as the "Gay Pride & HIV awareness march" in the old city area of Pune on 11 December 2011 where around 50 people from the LGBT community and equal number of supporters participated. It was organised by Samapathik Trust which is a men's sexual health organization. Participants were requested to not wear masks or paint their faces and to not engage in "skin show".

== 2011 ==
The 11 December 2011 parade was the first open pride parade event in Pune's history, and was organized by SAMAPATHIK TRUST, Pune (Reg. No E3662)(founded by Gay Activist Bindumadhav Khire). Samapathik Trust Staff had requested participants, who numbered around 50-60 according to Daily News and Analysis, (actual participants were 93) to not wear masks and to wear professional clothing in order to reflect the culturally-conservative "ethos" of the city. Participants who came from Mumbai noted the comparatively subdued atmosphere of the parade in comparison to the more-flamboyant atmosphere of Pride events in Mumbai. The parade was preceded the previous day by a Queer Fest in the Kala Chhaya, which was organized by Open Space, Birds of a Feather, The Queer Chronicle which is India's longest running LGBT monthly online magazine (Source: Indian Express, 8 November 2012) and Quintessence and hosted over 200 participants.

== 2012 ==
Pune witnessed its 2nd queer pride parade organized by Samapathik Trust on 9 December 2012. The pride parade focused upon breaking the stereotypical image of Queer people in the films and TV serials and creating awareness about the same along with clearing the misconceptions about the Gay community.

== 2013 ==
On 24 November 2013, The third edition of Pune pride saw more than 150 people from the LGBT community and allies walking the pride and showing their support towards the LGBTQ community. The parade started from Pune Sarvajanik Sabha at 11AM and it was led by the Sonal Giani and other members from Umang Trust in order to spread the sensitization about issues faced by Lesbian, Bisexual and Trans men from the Queer community. The highlight of the pride was the open support shown by Police department led by Inspector Bhanupratap Barge, whose team distributed Red Roses to the participants as a gesture of support and cooperation towards the rights of the community.

== 2014 ==
The fourth edition of the Pune LGBT Pride March will be held on Sunday, 9 November 2014, Organized by Samapathik Trust, Pune. The Theme of this year would be "Youngistan Zindabaad". As the theme suggests, The focus was on addressing the issues faced by the youngsters because it is very important for them to accept their sexuality and be aware of their rights. To incorporate more youths, the organizers have changed the route of the march, While earlier it used to be a walk through Laxmi Road and the Peth areas, this time around they will follow the JM Road and FC Road route.

== 2015 ==
On 23 August 2015 the fifth edition of Pune pride was organized by Samapathik Trust. The march started at 11AM from Sambaji Park at JM Road with participants from various cities walking down the lanes with posters and banners, colorful clothes and rainbow umbrellas with them. The pride theme this year was "Addressing the Transgender rights", in order to focus the issues related with the discrimination and harassment faced by Hijra/Transgender community due to section 377. There was a special bus being arranged by an organization called "Gay Bombay" to provide an easy conveyance for the participants from Mumbai willing to attend this Pride.

== 2016 ==
The sixth edition of Pune pride was organized by Samapathik Trust founded by Mr. Bindumadhav Khire on Sunday, 7 August 2016. The parade started from Sambhaji Park and following Fergusson college road it ended at back to JM Road. The pride theme for this year was "Inclusivity at workplace" to address the discrimination and challenges faced by LGBTQ employees in the corporate environment. Despite heavy rain, the pride march received a rousing response from the Queer community. It was the first time when the representatives from the multinational corporations like IBM, Symantec and ThoughtWorks showed their active participation by attending the pride carrying supporting banners and T-shirts.

== 2017 ==
The Seventh edition of Pune Pride took place on 11 June 2017 with 700 people participating in the march. The Pride parade received an open support by many known corporates like IBM, ADP, Thoughtworks, Symantec, Accenture, Symantec and The Bank of New York Mellon. The pride started at 10:30 AM from The Chhatrapati Sambhaji Garden, went down to Garware Chowk and ended at JM Road. The pride theme for this year was to express the gratitude towards parents, families and allies of LGBTQ people for their understanding, acceptance and due support. This was the first time when the grand Marshalls for the pride were the parents, siblings, Allies and friends of LGBTQ people leading the pride and spreading the message of supporting the cause.

The pride also received opposition from participants due to its stringent rules, telling attendees to wear "decent clothes" and not to use any placards or slogans which are against Supreme Court, political parties, leaders, religion and caste. To ensure the event ran with no issues one of the organizers hired six bouncers.

== 2018 ==
The Pune Pride march in 2018 was once again organised by the Samapathik Trust took place on 3 June and more than 800 community members and supporters were in attendance. The march was supported by prominent organisations including Humsafar Trust, Umang Organisation For Lesbian Bisexual and Transgender Women and Sweekar, and the Rainbow Parents of India. The pride also saw the support of the local police force as well as corporate houses. Veteran activists Ashok Row Kavi and Vivek Raj Anand from Humsafar Trust were felicitated at the event.

== 2019 ==
The ninth (9th) Pune LGBTIQ pride walk was organized by 'Indradhanu Committee' on 2 June 2019, a wing of 'Samapathik Trust'. Omkar Joshi, Sagar Barve and Sukrut Deshpande served as committee members. Dr. Jyoti Shetty, Psychiatrist, Bharati Vidyapith and Hospital, Pune was invited as Grand Marshal for the pride walk. There was marked presence of associates from corporate organizations viz. Cummins India, HSBC Bank, Northern Trust, Infosys, IBM, and Tata Consultancy Services (TCS) during the pride walk. Around 1000 participants attended the pride walk.

== 2020 ==
In 2020 the Citizenship Amendment Act protests heavily affected the Pune Pride organizing team, as Queer Azaadi Mumbai had been denied permission for their 2020 event after slogans related to the CAA were displayed during a previous gathering. Police were concerned that the Mumbai parade would be used to further protest the CAA. The 2019 organizer of Pune Pride took to social media to shame the organizers, accusing them of turning pride into an "anti-national activity". Following this the organizers of Pune Pride splintered. The leader of the Samapathik Trust, who organized the previous events later decided to step back.

== 2022 ==
After two year gap due to the pandemic, Pune Pride returned with the theme "Traditional Pride" on 5 June 2022. The event marked 10 years of Pune Pride, with the march beginning at Sambhaji Maharaj Garden near Deccan Pune and ending at the Fergusson College gate.

The events theme was controversial, as organizers announced that only the rainbow flag and the Indian flag would be allowed in to be displayed in the march. This meant the transgender flag, raising complaints that the event was not inclusive. Dalit Queer Project also voiced frustration with what they saw as a monopoly by upper caste organizers, with some attendees being told to keep their "Dalit identity at home".

== 2023 ==
2023 saw two separate Pride parades in Pune. The first was held in April and had been organized by the MIST Foundation. Organizers from MIST said they decided to hold a separate march was made after they felt a more inclusive and open Pride was needed in Pune.

The second march took place on 4 June, with YUTAK Charitable Trust running organizing the event. Organizers asked attendees to focus on the rights of the community, forbidding any political slogans or banners in the march. Political parties were allowed to join the Pride, but only to show support for the LGBT community.

== 2024 ==
In 2024 the city held two marches, with the MIST Foundation holding one and YUTAK Trust hosting the other.

== 2025 ==
Two Prides were held in 2025, with MIST Foundation running their event on June 1. They collaborated with seven other groups to strengthen the event. This followed MIST Foundation losing their United States Agency for International Development funding, making the organization turn to crowdfunding to run their programs.

The Yutak LGBTQ trust held their parade on June 8 with the District Judge of Pune leading the parade.

== 2026 ==
In 2026 the Pune Pride walk was scheduled for the 13 June, with several pre-pride events scheduled to address various issues faced by the community. This included a panel discussion with various transgender women held by Yutak LGBTQ trust, and a talk by the Police Sub-Inspector on how to avoid extortion on dating apps.

== See also ==
- Queer Azaadi Mumbai Pride March
- Orange City LGBT Pride March
