= Milind Mane =

Indian politician

Member of the Maharashtra Legislative Assembly for Nagpur North
- In office 2014–2019
- Preceded by: Nitin Raut
- Succeeded by: Nitin Raut

Personal details
- Born: 3 December 1970 (age 55) Nagpur, Maharashtra, India
- Party: Bharatiya Janata Party
- Spouse: Sarita Mane
- Children: 3 Tejal Mane, Aastha Mane, Maitreya Mane
- Occupation: Politician
- Website: www.mahabjp.org

Milind Mane (born 3 December 1970) was a member of the 13th Maharashtra Legislative Assembly. He represented the Nagpur North Assembly Constituency. He belongs to the Bharatiya Janata Party (BJP). Mane has been a corporator in the Nagpur Municipal Corporation, in 2012, as sitting corporator, he unsuccessfully contested the municipal corporation elections representing the RPI Aghadi. Mane is a medical doctor.

== Early life ==
Mane was born in Paras village of Akola district. His father was a gateman with the Indian Railways, who was an alcoholic, the family sank in poverty. His mother therefore had to supplement the family income by working as a labourer. Poverty forced Mane as a child and youth to do various types of farm jobs, hawking and menial work, and at one time he was forced to beg for a living for several days. He studied dentistry for six months, however he shifted to studying medicine on obtaining admission to Indira Gandhi Government Medical college, from where he secured his MBBS degree. He subsequently secured his MD degree.

== Political career ==
=== Positions held ===
==== Within BJP ====
- MLA in 2014 by defeating Cabinet Minister Nitin Raut

==== Legislative ====
- BJP MLA in 2014 Maharashtra Legislative Assembly

Mane is a vocal supporter of LGBTQ rights in the region. He is known to have spoken in various LGBTQ events about the importance of sex education in school and discrimination against the LGBTQ community. During his tenure as North Nagpur MLA, he flagged off the first Orange City LGBTQ Pride March in Nagpur in 2016.
