= Sanjay Gaikwad =

Indian politician

Member of the Maharashtra Legislative Assembly
- In office 24 October 2019 – 24 October 2024
- Preceded by: Harshwardhan Sapkal
- Constituency: Buldhana
- Incumbent
- Assumed office 25 October 2024

Personal details
- Born: July 1, 1967 (age 59) Buldhana, Maharashtra
- Party: Shiv Sena
- Other political affiliations: Maharashtra Navnirman Sena (2014)
- Spouse: Pooja Gaikwad
- Children: 2
- Occupation: Politician

Sanjay Gaikwad is an Indian politician who served as a MLA in the Maharashtra Legislative Assembly from Buldhana Assembly constituency as a member of Shiv Sena. He became MLA for the second time by winning from the constituency with a narrow margin of 841 seats in the 2024 assembly elections. In 2024 assembly elections, he won the seat again.

== Positions held ==
- 2019: Elected to Maharashtra Legislative Assembly
- 2024: Elected to Maharashtra Legislative Assembly

== Controversies ==
In September 2024, before the assembly elections, Sanjay Gaikwad stirred controversy after saying that he would give ₹11 lakh (US$11,000) to anyone who chops off Leader of the Opposition in Lok Sabha Rahul Gandhi's tongue for his remarks on reservations in India.

He allegedly assaulted a canteen staffer at the Akashwani MLA residence over stale food on 8 July 2025. Gaikwad stated that he does not regret his action, describing it as "Shiv Sena style" and indicating that he was adhering to the teachings of Bal Thackeray. Opposition parties have condemned him for his behaviour.
