= N. M. Kamble =

Indian politician (1925–2021)

Narendra Marutrao Kamble

President of the Maharashtra Pradesh Congress Committee
- In office 1989–1990
- Chief Minister: Sharad Pawar
- Succeeded by: Sushil Kumar Shinde
- In office 1983–1985
- Preceded by: S. M. I. Amir
- Succeeded by: Prabha Rau

Cabinet Minister, Government of Maharashtra
- In office 2 November 1989 – 3 March 1990
- Minister for: Rural Development; Protocol; Housing; Labour; Textiles; Relief and rehabilitation

Member of Parliament, Rajya Sabha
- In office 1974–1982
- Constituency: Maharashtra
- In office 1984–1988
- Constituency: Maharashtra

Vice-Chairman, National Commission for Scheduled Castes
- In office 2007–2010

Mayor of Mumbai
- In office 1957–1962

Personal details
- Born: October 24, 1925 Bavdhan, Satara District, Bombay Presidency, British India
- Died: 3 April 2021 (aged 95)
- Party: Indian National Congress
- Other political affiliations: Republican Party of India

Narendra Marutrao Kamble (24 October 1925 – 3 April 2021) was an Indian politician. He was a Member of Parliament representing Maharashtra in the Rajya Sabha the upper house of India's Parliament as member of the Indian National Congress. He was the Vice-Chairman of the National Commission for Scheduled Castes. He was an Ambedkarite and Buddhist. He died on 3 April 2021.
