= Sanjay Savkare =

Indian politician

Minister of Textiles Government of Maharashtra
- Incumbent
- Assumed office 15 December 2024
- Chief Minister: Devendra Fadnavis
- Guardian minister: Bhandara district
- Preceded by: Chandrakant Patil

Minister of State Government of Maharashtra
- In office 11 June 2013 – 28 September 2014
- Chief Minister: Prithviraj Chavan
- Minister: Radhakrishna Vikhe Patil
- Department: Agriculture

Member of Maharashtra Legislative Assembly
- Incumbent
- Assumed office 2009
- Preceded by: Santosh Chaudhari
- Constituency: Bhusawal

Personal details
- Born: 11 December 1969 (age 55); Bhusawal, Maharashtra, India
- Political party: Bharatiya Janata Party
- Occupation: Politician

Sanjay Savkare is member of Bharatiya Janata Party and represents Bhusawal Constituency. He was in NCP before joining BJP.

== Education and early career ==
He studied in Bhusawal.

== Political career ==
Sanjay Savkare was member of Nationalist Congress Party representing Bhusawal in 2009.

=== Positions held ===
Guardian Minister of Jalgaon District

==== Legislative ====
- Member, Maharashtra Legislative Assembly- 2014

== See also ==
- Devendra Fadnavis ministry (2014–)
- Make in Maharashtra
