= Harshwardhan Vasantrao Sapkal =

Indian politician

Harshwardhan Sapkal

25th President of Maharashtra Pradesh Congress Committee
- Incumbent
- Assumed office 13 February 2025
- Preceded by: Nana Patole

Member of Maharashtra Legislative Assembly
- In office 2014–2019
- Preceded by: Vijay Shinde
- Succeeded by: Sanjay Gaikwad
- Constituency: Buldhana

Personal details
- Born: 31 August 1968 (age 57)
- Party: INC
- Education: Graduate
- Occupation: Politician

Harshwardhan Vasantrao Sapkal is a member of the 13th Maharashtra Assembly. He also represented the Buldhana Assembly constituency between 2014 and 2019 and he belongs to the Indian National Congress and he served as the president of the Buldhana Zilla Parishad from 1999 to 2002 and in 1999, when he was 27 & became one of Maharashtra's youngest leaders in that role.

Once a state-level kabaddi player who joined the National Students' Union of India (NSUI), the Congress's student wing, Sapkal started his career as a sarpanch in Buldhana.

In 1999, when he was 27, Sapkal became one of the youngest zilla parishad chiefs of the state.

In 2014, he became MLA for the first time, winning from the Buldhana Assembly seat on a Congress ticket. He has handled organisational work for the Congress in Gujarat and Madhya Pradesh and was earlier secretary, AICC. He currently heads the Rajiv Gandhi Panchayat Raj Sanghatan, an outfit affiliated with the Congress which works for the empowerment of local self-government bodies, and is considered close to the Leader of the Opposition in Lok Sabha, Rahul Gandhi.

Sapkal describes himself as a committed "sarvodayee" – the Gandhian ideology conceptualised and popularised by his disciple Vinoba Bhave with a vision for a class-free society.

On 22 March 2017, Sapkal was suspended along with 18 other MLAs until 31 December for interrupting Maharashtra Finance Minister Sudhir Mungantiwar during a state budget session and burning copies of the budget outside the assembly four days earlier.
