= Nagpur LGBT Queer Carnival =

LGBTQ event in Nagpur, India

Nagpur LGBT Queer Carnival is an annual event organised by Orange Tales, a start up event organisation, as a part of Pride Month celebrations in Nagpur, Maharashtra. The purpose of the event is to spread awareness about the community around the city. The event involves dance performances, story telling, and poetry reading events. This event has been held annually since 2018. The event is attended by various local celebrities and members from the LGBT+ community
