= Padali =

Village in Maharashtra

- Village
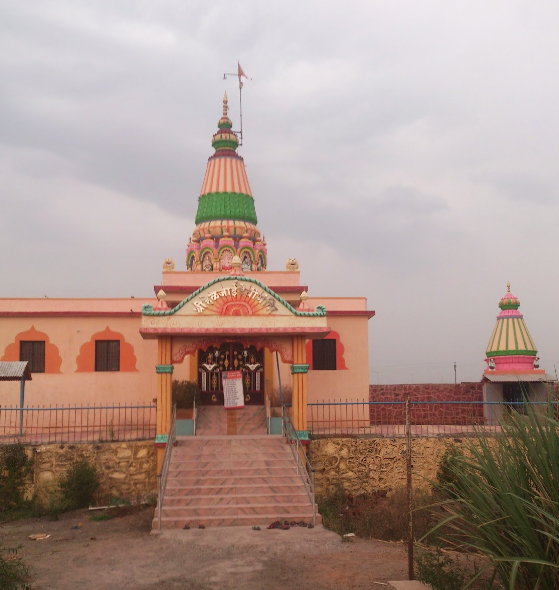
- Heljai Mandir Padali

- Location in Maharashtra, India
- Coordinates: 17.4801163°N 74.1856956°E
- Country: India
- State: Maharashtra
- District: Satara

Government
  - Body: Grampanchayat
  - Sarpanch: Bhanudas Jadhav
- Elevation: 56 m (184 ft)

Population (2011)
  - Total: 3,550
- Demonym: Padalkar
- Time zone: UTC+5:30 (IST)
- PIN: 415106
- Telephone code: +91-2164
- Vehicle registration: MH- 50
- Website: www.padali.in

Padali is a census village in Karad Taluka, Satara District, Maharashtra, India. It is surrounded by mountains on three sides. There is a temple of Heljaidevi Mandir. The main occupation of the village is agriculture, with more than 75% of the total area being used for agricultural activities.

Per the Constitution of India and Panchyati Raaj Act, Padali is administrated by an elected Sarpanch (head of village).

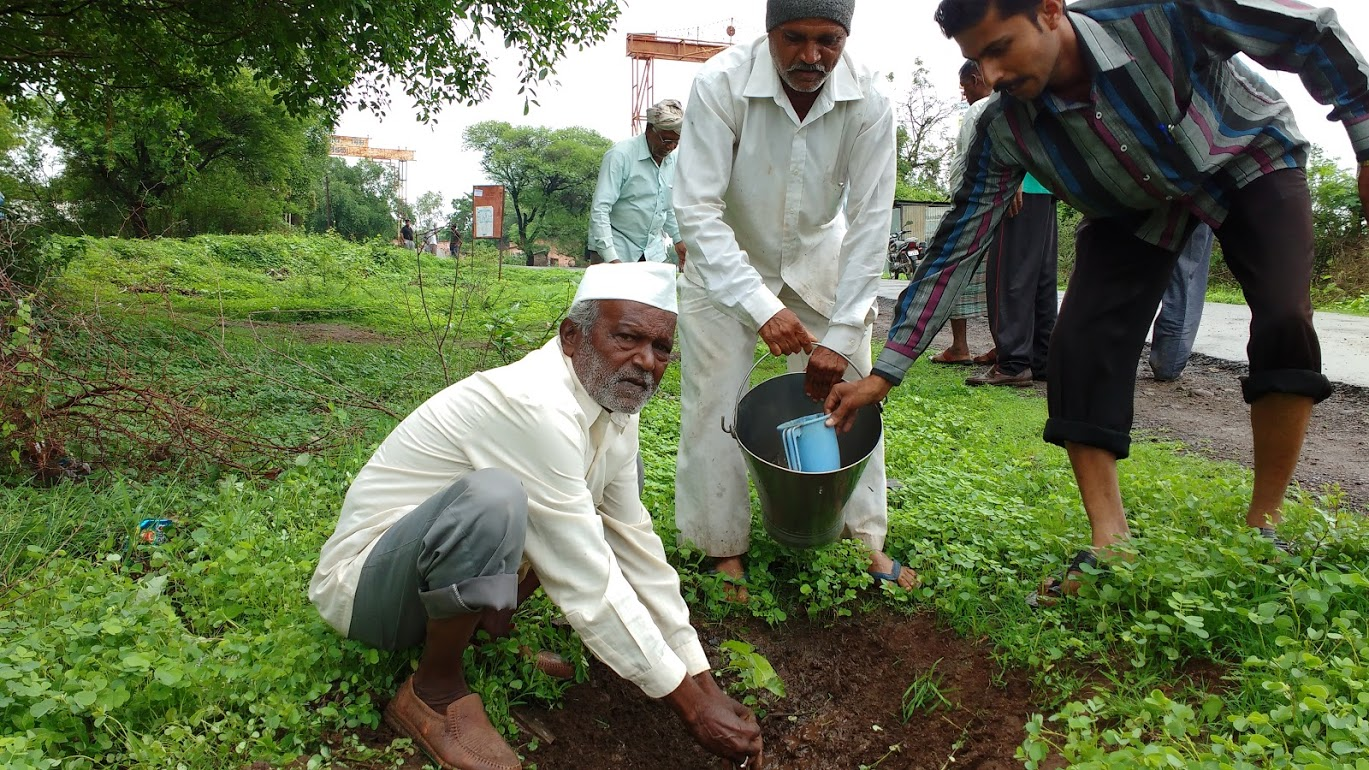
HeljaiMata Bachat Gat Tree Plantation 2016

== History ==
=== List of sarpanch ===
• Bhanudas Jadhav 2022- present

- Surekha Jadhav 2017-2022
- Manjusha Bhoj 2012-2017
- Bhanudash Jadhav 2007-2012
- Uma Augade 2002-2007
- Shivaji Bhoj 1997-2002

== Geography ==
Padali is a village in Karad Taluka in Satara District of Maharashtra, India. It belongs to Desh or Paschim Maharashtra region and to Pune Division. It is located 32 km to the south of Satara, the district headquarters. It is located 28 km from Karad, and 276 km from the state capital Mumbai. The pin code is 415106 and the post office is Padali (Satara). Nearby villages include Gaikwadwadi, Gosavewadi, Banugadewadi, Wather, Sathewadi. Padali is surrounded by Karad Taluka to the north, Kadegaon Taluka to the South, Koregaon Taluka to the east, and Patan Taluka to the west.

Nearby cities include Satara, Wai, Mahabaleswar, and Karad.

== Locality ==
Railway station

- Satara Rail Way Station - 35 km
- Targaon Rail Way Station - 10 km

Engineering Colleges near Padali

- Satara Polytechnic Khindwadi Satara
- K.B.P. Polytechnic, Panmalevadi varied Satara
- Gourishankar Polytechnic, Limb Khind Satara
- Government Eng. College, Vidhyanagar Karad
- Satara College of Pharmacy Degaon, Satara

Schools & Colleges near Padali

- Z.P. Primary School Padali
- Sardar Babasaheb Mane Vidyalaya Padali
