= Savner Assembly constituency =

Constituency of the Maharashtra legislative assembly in India

Coordinates: 21.4°N 78.9°E

Savner
- Constituency No. 49 for the Maharashtra Legislative Assembly
- Savner Assembly constituency

Constituency details
- Country: India
- Region: Western India
- State: Maharashtra
- District: Nagpur
- Lok Sabha constituency: Ramtek
- Established: 1961
- Total electors: 322,122
- Reservation: None

Member of Legislative Assembly
- 15th Maharashtra Legislative Assembly
- Incumbent Ashish Deshmukh
- Party: BJP
- Alliance: NDA
- Elected year: 2024

Savner Assembly constituency formerly Saoner is one of twelve constituencies of the Maharashtra Vidhan Sabha located in Nagpur district.

It is a part of the Ramtek Lok Sabha constituency (SC) from Nagpur district along with five other assembly constituencies, viz. Katol, Hingna, Umred (SC), Kamthi and Ramtek Assembly constituency.

On 24 December 2023, Savner Assembly Constituency became vacant as Sunil Chhatrapal Kedar was disqualified from the Maharashtra Legislative Assembly.

== Members of the Legislative Assembly ==
Year	Member	Party
1962	Narendra Tidke	Indian National Congress
1967	Narendra Tidke	Indian National Congress
1972	Narendra Tidke	Indian National Congress
1978	Ramji Naik	Indian National Congress (I)
1980	Ramji Naik	Indian National Congress (I)
1985	Ranjeet Deshmukh	Indian National Congress
1990	Ranjeet Deshmukh	Indian National Congress
1995	Sunil Kedar	Independent
1999	Devrao Asole	Bharatiya Janata Party
2004	Sunil Kedar	Independent
2009	Sunil Kedar	Indian National Congress
2014	Sunil Kedar	Indian National Congress
2019	Sunil Kedar	Indian National Congress
2024	Ashish Deshmukh	Bharatiya Janata Party

== Election results ==
=== Assembly Election 2024 ===
2024 Maharashtra Legislative Assembly election : Savner
Party	Candidate	Votes	%	±%
BJP	Ashish Ranjeet Deshmukh	119,725	53.75	▲12.34
INC	Anuja Sunil Kedar	93,324	41.90	▼12.04
BSP	Tarabai Babulalji Gaurakar	2,263	1.02	▼1.07
VBA	Ajay Kundalik Sahare	2,152	0.97	▼0.72
NOTA	None of the Above	633	0.28	▼0.58
Margin of victory		26,401	11.85	▼0.68
Turnout		2,23,374	69.34	▲1.25
Total valid votes		2,22,741		
Registered electors		3,22,122		▲3.57
BJP gain from INC		Swing	▼0.18	

=== Assembly Election 2019 ===
2019 Maharashtra Legislative Assembly election : Savner
Party	Candidate	Votes	%	±%
INC	Sunil Chhatrapal Kedar	113,184	53.93	▲7.95
BJP	Rajeev Bhaskarrao Potdar	86,893	41.41	New
BSP	Sanchayata Sudesh Patil	4,381	2.09	▼3.94
VBA	Pramod Vyankatrao Bagde	3,539	1.69	New
NOTA	None of the Above	1,819	0.87	▼0.59
Margin of victory		26,291	12.53	▲7.52
Turnout		2,11,781	68.09	▼0.02
Total valid votes		2,09,853		
Registered electors		3,11,018		▲15.11
INC hold		Swing	▲7.95	

=== Assembly Election 2014 ===
2014 Maharashtra Legislative Assembly election : Savner
Party	Candidate	Votes	%	±%
INC	Sunil Chhatrapal Kedar	84,630	45.99	▼1.14
SS	Vinod Bapuraoji Jivtode (Guruji)	75,421	40.98	New
BSP	Sureshbabu Dongre	11,097	6.03	▲2.20
NCP	Kishor Shankarrao Chaodhari	6,139	3.34	New
NOTA	None of the Above	2,681	1.46	New
Margin of victory		9,209	5.00	▲3.02
Turnout		1,86,879	69.17	▼2.30
Total valid votes		1,84,030		
Registered electors		2,70,185		▲8.73
INC hold		Swing	▼1.14	

=== Assembly Election 2009 ===
2009 Maharashtra Legislative Assembly election : Savner
Party	Candidate	Votes	%	±%
INC	Sunil Chhatrapal Kedar	82,452	47.13	▲40.79
BJP	Ashish Ranjeet Deshmukh	78,980	45.14	▲12.84
BSP	Chandrakant Vinayakrao Wankhede	6,699	3.83	▼8.38
Independent	Bhimrao Raghobaji Nikose	2,250	1.29	New
Independent	Ashish Deshmukh	1,280	0.73	New
Margin of victory		3,472	1.98	▼7.01
Turnout		1,75,056	70.45	▼4.12
Total valid votes		1,74,957		
Registered electors		2,48,489		▲23.63
INC gain from Independent		Swing	▲5.83	

=== Assembly Election 2004 ===
2004 Maharashtra Legislative Assembly election : Savner
Party	Candidate	Votes	%	±%
Independent	Sunil Chhatrapal Kedar	61,863	41.30	New
BJP	Deorao Vitthalrao Asole	48,396	32.31	▼4.31
BSP	Amarchand Fulchand Jain	18,293	12.21	▲9.14
INC	Prof. Chandansingh Premsingh Rotele	9,499	6.34	▼20.77
Independent	Sunil Shamrao Pal	3,614	2.41	New
Independent	Pramod Namdeorao Dhole	2,133	1.42	New
GGP	Dinesh Kaluram Uikey	1,570	1.05	New
Margin of victory		13,467	8.99	▲5.37
Turnout		1,49,837	74.55	▲8.93
Total valid votes		1,49,799		
Registered electors		2,00,994		▲14.46
Independent gain from BJP		Swing	▲4.68	

=== Assembly Election 1999 ===
1999 Maharashtra Legislative Assembly election : Savner
Party	Candidate	Votes	%	±%
BJP	Devrao Vitthalrao Asole	42,180	36.62	▲20.98
NCP	Sunil Chhatrapal Kedar	38,005	32.99	New
INC	Shantaram Ramchandra Gawande	31,228	27.11	▼0.30
BSP	Suresh Nilkanth Kekatpure	3,535	3.07	▼4.35
Margin of victory		4,175	3.62	▼11.44
Turnout		1,21,632	69.26	▼16.41
Total valid votes		1,15,197		
Registered electors		1,75,604		▲1.39
BJP gain from Independent		Swing	▼5.85	

=== Assembly Election 1995 ===
1995 Maharashtra Legislative Assembly election : Savner
Party	Candidate	Votes	%	±%
Independent	Sunil Chhatrapal Kedar	60,325	42.47	New
INC	Ranjeet Deshmukh	38,932	27.41	▼8.49
BJP	Dadarao Mahadeorao Mangale	22,206	15.63	▼15.80
BSP	Suresh Nilkanth Kekatpure	10,538	7.42	▲2.36
Independent	Jaibhulkar Atmaram Dajiba	2,497	1.76	New
Independent	Dhore Bhujangrao Nathuji	1,969	1.39	New
Independent	Ashok Vithalrao Ingole	1,144	0.81	New
Margin of victory		21,393	15.06	▲10.59
Turnout		1,45,097	83.78	▲16.42
Total valid votes		1,42,041		
Registered electors		1,73,198		▲12.03
Independent gain from INC		Swing	▲6.57	

=== Assembly Election 1990 ===
1990 Maharashtra Legislative Assembly election : Savner
Party	Candidate	Votes	%	±%
INC	Ranjeet Deshmukh	36,410	35.90	▼15.67
BJP	Dadarao Mahadeorao Mangale	31,873	31.43	▼6.50
Independent	S. Q. Jama Abdul Quddus	8,020	7.91	New
Independent	Krushnarao Baburaoji Mowade	6,513	6.42	New
BSP	Suresh Nilkanth Kekatpure	5,129	5.06	New
PWPI	Narayan Anantramjji Kedar	4,703	4.64	New
BRP	Aole Anil Kawaduji	2,333	2.30	New
Margin of victory		4,537	4.47	▼9.17
Turnout		1,03,155	66.72	▲8.64
Total valid votes		1,01,412		
Registered electors		1,54,605		▲30.77
INC hold		Swing	▼15.67	

=== Assembly Election 1985 ===
1985 Maharashtra Legislative Assembly election : Savner
Party	Candidate	Votes	%	±%
INC	Ranjeet Deshmukh	34,728	51.58	New
BJP	Dadarao Mahadeorao Mangale	25,539	37.93	New
RPI(K)	Ganpati Tulhsiram Dhole	2,451	3.64	New
Independent	Dhanraj Kawadu Awale	1,667	2.48	New
Independent	Rewaram Gowardhan Chakrawarti	631	0.94	New
Independent	Dhote Shrikant Madhukarrao	620	0.92	New
Independent	Narottam Bapurao Lambhare	495	0.74	New
Margin of victory		9,189	13.65	▲1.48
Turnout		68,647	58.06	▲4.74
Total valid votes		67,332		
Registered electors		1,18,229		▲11.21
INC gain from INC(I)		Swing	▼0.55	

=== Assembly Election 1980 ===
1980 Maharashtra Legislative Assembly election : Savner
Party	Candidate	Votes	%	±%
INC(I)	Ramji Chiman Naik	28,932	52.13	▲2.38
INC(U)	Vithalrao Kisan Ingole	22,181	39.96	New
RPI	Gajendra Umashankar Lodhi	2,602	4.69	New
Independent	Narottam Bapurao Lambghare	1,161	2.09	New
Independent	Sheshrao Tohluji Bagde	629	1.13	New
Margin of victory		6,751	12.16	▼5.29
Turnout		56,654	53.29	▼21.69
Total valid votes		55,505		
Registered electors		1,06,310		▲5.55
INC(I) hold		Swing	▲2.38	

=== Assembly Election 1978 ===
1978 Maharashtra Legislative Assembly election : Savner
Party	Candidate	Votes	%	±%
INC(I)	Ramji Chiman Naik	37,028	49.75	New
JP	Shankerao Ramchandrarao Phate	24,034	32.29	New
INC	Chhatrapal Anandrao Kedar	13,078	17.57	▼33.26
Margin of victory		12,994	17.46	▲9.32
Turnout		76,375	75.83	▲10.83
Total valid votes		74,433		
Registered electors		1,00,720		▲8.42
INC(I) gain from INC		Swing	▼1.09	

=== Assembly Election 1972 ===
1972 Maharashtra Legislative Assembly election : Saoner
Party	Candidate	Votes	%	±%
INC	Narendra Mahipati Tidke	29,784	50.83	▼7.27
AIFB	Bhau Jambuwantrao Dhote	25,018	42.70	New
RPI	Mool Janardan Mahadeorao	2,113	3.61	▼14.07
RPI(K)	Dayaram Shrawan Nikose	1,678	2.86	New
Margin of victory		4,766	8.13	▼32.29
Turnout		60,805	65.46	▼0.38
Total valid votes		58,593		
Registered electors		92,895		▲14.70
INC hold		Swing	▼7.27	

=== Assembly Election 1967 ===
1967 Maharashtra Legislative Assembly election : Saoner
Party	Candidate	Votes	%	±%
INC	Narendra Mahipati Tidke	29,859	58.11	▲6.31
RPI	S. Z. Deshbhratar	9,086	17.68	New
ABJS	K. B. Dhote	7,538	14.67	▲6.38
Independent	Ramji Chimnaji Naik	3,882	7.55	New
Independent	M. L. Danao	1,023	1.99	New
Margin of victory		20,773	40.42	▲12.26
Turnout		54,271	67.01	▲5.33
Total valid votes		51,388		
Registered electors		80,988		▲13.86
INC hold		Swing	▲6.31	

=== Assembly Election 1962 ===
1962 Maharashtra Legislative Assembly election : Saoner
Party	Candidate	Votes	%	±%
INC	Narendra Mahipati Tidke	21,413	51.80	New
Independent	Ramji Chimnaji Naik	9,771	23.64	New
CPI	Fatesingh Hansrajsing Thakur	5,983	14.47	New
ABJS	Ranchhoddas Asaram Gandhi	3,425	8.29	New
Independent	Tejrao Nagorao Kedar	747	1.81	New
Margin of victory		11,642	28.16	
Turnout		43,579	61.27	
Total valid votes		41,339		
Registered electors		71,128		
INC win (new seat)				

== See also ==
- Savner
- Kalameshwar
