= Nagpur North Assembly constituency =

Constituency of the Maharashtra legislative assembly in India

Coordinates: 21.22°N 79.09°E

Nagpur North
- Constituency No. 57 for the Maharashtra Legislative Assembly

Constituency details
- Country: India
- Region: Western India
- State: Maharashtra
- District: Nagpur
- Lok Sabha constituency: Nagpur
- Established: 1967
- Total electors: 428,993
- Reservation: SC

Member of Legislative Assembly
- 15th Maharashtra Legislative Assembly
- Incumbent Nitin Raut
- Party: INC
- Alliance: MVA
- Elected year: 2024

Nagpur North Assembly constituency is one of the 288 Vidhan Sabha (legislative assembly) constituencies of Maharashtra state in central India. It is one of the six assembly seats which make up Nagpur Lok Sabha constituency. The constituency is represented by Nitin Raut, who serves as a minister in the Government of Maharashtra. By Saksham bhau

== Extent of the constituency ==
The Assembly Constituency presently comprises the following neighbourhoods:

Neighbourhood
Jaripatka
Mankapur
Wanjra ( Ajri Majri )
Kalamna Market
New Khasala
Teka Naka
Indora (Kamal Chowk part)
Rani Durgawati chowk
Vaishali Nagar
Shanti Nagar

== Members of the Legislative Assembly ==
Year	Name	Party
Until 1967: Constituency did not exist
1967	P. R. Wasnik	Indian National Congress
1972	Daulatrao Ganvir	All India Forward Bloc
1978	Suryakant Dongre	Republican Party of India
1980	Suryakant Dongre	Republican Party of India
1985	Damyantibai Deshbhratar	Indian National Congress
1990	Upendra Shende	Republican Party of India
1995	Badhel Bhola Janglu	Bharatiya Janata Party
1999	Nitin Raut	Indian National Congress
2004	Nitin Raut	Indian National Congress
2009	Nitin Raut	Indian National Congress
2014	Milind Mane	Bharatiya Janata Party
2019	Nitin Raut	Indian National Congress
2024	Nitin Raut	Indian National Congress

== Election results ==
=== Assembly Election 2024 ===
2024 Maharashtra Legislative Assembly election : Nagpur North
Party	Candidate	Votes	%	±%
INC	Dr. Nitin Kashinath Raut	127,877	51.22%	▲6.42
BJP	Dr. Milind Mane	99,410	39.82%	▲5.70
BSP	Manoj Dashrath Sangole	12,487	5.00%	▼7.04
AIMIM	Dongare Kirti Deepak	3,819	1.53%	▼3.28
NOTA	None of the Above	988	0.40%	▼0.63
Margin of victory		28,467	11.40%	▲0.72
Turnout		250,632	58.42%	▲7.83
Total valid votes		249,644		
Registered electors		428,993		▲11.50
INC hold		Swing	▲6.42	

=== Assembly Election 2019 ===
2019 Maharashtra Legislative Assembly election : Nagpur North
Party	Candidate	Votes	%	±%
INC	Dr. Nitin Kashinath Raut	86,821	44.80%	▲17.15
BJP	Dr. Milind Mane	66,127	34.12%	▼3.96
BSP	Suresh Bhagwan Sakhare	23,333	12.04%	▼18.46
AIMIM	Dongare Kirti Deepak	9,318	4.81%	New
VBA	Vinay Purushottam Bhange	5,599	2.89%	New
NOTA	None of the Above	1,986	1.02%	▲0.62
Margin of victory		20,694	10.68%	▲3.10
Turnout		195,842	50.90%	▼3.15
Total valid votes		193,785		
Registered electors		384,742		▲13.79
INC gain from BJP		Swing	▲6.72	

=== Assembly Election 2014 ===
2014 Maharashtra Legislative Assembly election : Nagpur North
Party	Candidate	Votes	%	±%
BJP	Dr. Milind Mane	68,905	38.08%	▲12.13
BSP	Kishore Uttamrao Gajbhiye Ias (R)	55,187	30.50%	▲21.79
INC	Dr. Nitin Kashinath Raut	50,042	27.65%	▼9.87
NOTA	None of the Above	734	0.41%	New
Margin of victory		13,718	7.58%	▼3.99
Turnout		181,756	53.75%	▲5.60
Total valid votes		180,952		
Registered electors		338,120		▲4.95
BJP gain from INC		Swing	▲0.56	

=== Assembly Election 2009 ===
2009 Maharashtra Legislative Assembly election : Nagpur North
Party	Candidate	Votes	%	±%
INC	Dr. Nitin Kashinath Raut	57,929	37.52%	▼12.73
BJP	Tambe Rajesh	40,067	25.95%	▲2.12
Independent	Dr. Milind Mane	23,662	15.33%	New
BSP	Dharampal Alias Dharamkumar Deorao Patil	13,447	8.71%	▼10.97
IUML	Sangode Neha	5,382	3.49%	New
Independent	Sangole Manoj Dashrath	3,111	2.02%	New
Democratic Secular Party	Dr. Kavita Sonkusare (Shende)	2,481	1.61%	New
Margin of victory		17,862	11.57%	▼14.85
Turnout		154,892	48.08%	▲1.93
Total valid votes		154,379		
Registered electors		322,158		▲5.23
INC hold		Swing	▼12.73	

=== Assembly Election 2004 ===
2004 Maharashtra Legislative Assembly election : Nagpur North
Party	Candidate	Votes	%	±%
INC	Dr. Nitin Kashinath Raut	70,758	50.26%	▼2.15
BJP	Nanaji Sitaram Shamkule	33,556	23.83%	▼10.26
BSP	Rajesh Tambe	27,704	19.68%	▲15.21
BBM	Dr. Milind Mane	3,714	2.64%	New
Independent	Waman Shivaji Somkuwar	1,259	0.89%	New
SP	Upendra Mangal Das Shende	1,222	0.87%	New
Margin of victory		37,202	26.42%	▲8.11
Turnout		140,806	45.99%	▼3.62
Total valid votes		140,791		
Registered electors		306,139		▲18.60
INC hold		Swing	▼2.15	

=== Assembly Election 1999 ===
1999 Maharashtra Legislative Assembly election : Nagpur North
Party	Candidate	Votes	%	±%
INC	Dr. Nitin Kashinath Raut	67,110	52.41%	New
BJP	Suryavanshi (K. P. ) Krushnakumar Premlal	43,658	34.10%	▼7.02
BSP	Karwade Rajendra Domaji	5,714	4.46%	▼5.95
Independent	Patil Dharmkumar Deorao	4,375	3.42%	New
Independent	Bhola Jangluji Badhel	3,313	2.59%	New
Independent	Shende Upendra Mangaldas	2,612	2.04%	New
Margin of victory		23,452	18.32%	▲5.90
Turnout		130,726	50.64%	▼13.54
Total valid votes		128,046		
Registered electors		258,134		▲5.56
INC gain from BJP		Swing	▲11.30	

=== Assembly Election 1995 ===
1995 Maharashtra Legislative Assembly election : Nagpur North
Party	Candidate	Votes	%	±%
BJP	Badhel Bhola Janglu	63,488	41.11%	▲17.41
RPI(K)	Shende Upendra Mangaldas	44,320	28.70%	▼8.60
BSP	Motghare Rajratan Wamanrao	16,084	10.42%	▲3.45
Independent	Sheikh Mustafa Sheikh Husain	11,872	7.69%	New
Independent	Janorkar Ramratan Jalim	5,659	3.66%	New
Independent	Pandurang Shrawanji Hiwrale	2,133	1.38%	New
Independent	Karwade Charandas Haridas	1,235	0.80%	New
Margin of victory		19,168	12.41%	▼1.18
Turnout		157,411	64.37%	▲18.89
Total valid votes		154,424		
Registered electors		244,547		▲20.14
BJP gain from RPI(K)		Swing	▲3.82	

=== Assembly Election 1990 ===
1990 Maharashtra Legislative Assembly election : Nagpur North
Party	Candidate	Votes	%	±%
RPI(K)	Shende Upendra Mangaldas	33,603	37.30%	New
BJP	Badhel Bhola	21,358	23.71%	New
Independent	Lokhande Bhaurao Bajirao	14,205	15.77%	New
BSP	Motghare Rajratan Wamanrao	6,277	6.97%	New
CPI	Nahar Shersingh Ramuji	6,186	6.87%	New
Independent	Raut Nitin Alias Namdeo Kashinath	3,947	4.38%	New
INS(SCS)	Samundre Niolprabha Horilal	827	0.92%	New
Margin of victory		12,245	13.59%	▼0.47
Turnout		91,033	44.72%	▲0.13
Total valid votes		90,094		
Registered electors		203,556		▲38.15
RPI(K) gain from INC		Swing	▼17.30	

=== Assembly Election 1985 ===
1985 Maharashtra Legislative Assembly election : Nagpur North
Party	Candidate	Votes	%	±%
INC	Damuantibai Madhukar Deshbhratar	35,507	54.60%	New
RPI	Dongre Suryakant Jagobaji	26,364	40.54%	New
Independent	Ramdas Vithobaji Meshram	1,687	2.59%	New
Independent	Dinanath Jagdish Bagade	1,020	1.57%	New
Margin of victory		9,143	14.06%	▲2.34
Turnout		65,670	44.57%	▲0.46
Total valid votes		65,029		
Registered electors		147,342		▲17.46
INC gain from RPI(K)		Swing	▲0.95	

=== Assembly Election 1980 ===
1980 Maharashtra Legislative Assembly election : Nagpur North
Party	Candidate	Votes	%	±%
RPI(K)	Dongre Suryakant Jagobaji	29,397	53.66%	▲7.49
INC(I)	Belekar Pushpchandra Marotrao	22,975	41.93%	▼0.93
INC(U)	Pantawane Mahanand Haribhau	2,416	4.41%	New
Margin of victory		6,422	11.72%	▲8.42
Turnout		55,331	44.11%	▼22.45
Total valid votes		54,788		
Registered electors		125,442		▲10.68
RPI(K) hold		Swing	▲7.49	

=== Assembly Election 1978 ===
1978 Maharashtra Legislative Assembly election : Nagpur North
Party	Candidate	Votes	%	±%
RPI(K)	Dongre Suryakant Jagobaji	34,598	46.16%	▲22.96
INC(I)	Balkrishna Ramchandra Wasnik	32,121	42.86%	New
INC	Ganvir Daulatrao Husan	3,560	4.75%	▼25.66
CPI	Gabhiye Kashinath Lataru	2,840	3.79%	New
Independent	Uke Tarachand Gomaji	756	1.01%	New
Independent	Lanjewar Bhimshankar Tukaram	450	0.60%	New
Margin of victory		2,477	3.31%	▲0.63
Turnout		76,300	67.32%	▲7.66
Total valid votes		74,945		
Registered electors		113,340		▼4.64
RPI(K) gain from AIFB		Swing	▲13.08	

=== Assembly Election 1972 ===
1972 Maharashtra Legislative Assembly election : Nagpur North
Party	Candidate	Votes	%	±%
AIFB	Daulatrao Husanji Ganvir	22,993	33.09%	New
INC	Ganpat Hiralal Bhagat	21,135	30.41%	▼14.46
RPI(K)	Suryankant J. Dongre	16,123	23.20%	New
RPI	Kisan Hanuji Jambhulkar	3,546	5.10%	▼34.2
Independent	Madhukarrao S. Wasnik	2,590	3.73%	New
Independent	Damyantibai S. Dongre	1,463	2.11%	New
Independent	Bhaiyyasaheb Chaware	488	0.70%	New
Margin of victory		1,858	2.67%	▼2.90
Turnout		70,820	59.58%	▼3.85
Total valid votes		69,493		
Registered electors		118,861		▲13.02
AIFB gain from INC		Swing	▼11.78	

=== Assembly Election 1967 ===
1967 Maharashtra Legislative Assembly election : Nagpur North
Party	Candidate	Votes	%	±%
INC	P. R. Wasnik	29,404	44.87%	New
RPI	D. G. Songare	25,754	39.30%	New
Independent	P. H. Shambharkar	3,905	5.96%	New
Independent	N. L. Jambhurkar	3,826	5.84%	New
Independent	R. R. Sonak	1,725	2.63%	New
Independent	P. T. Patel	656	1.00%	New
Margin of victory		3,650	5.57%	
Turnout		70,025	66.59%	
Total valid votes		65,534		
Registered electors		105,166		
INC win (new seat)				
