= Sunil Chhatrapal Kedar =

Indian politician

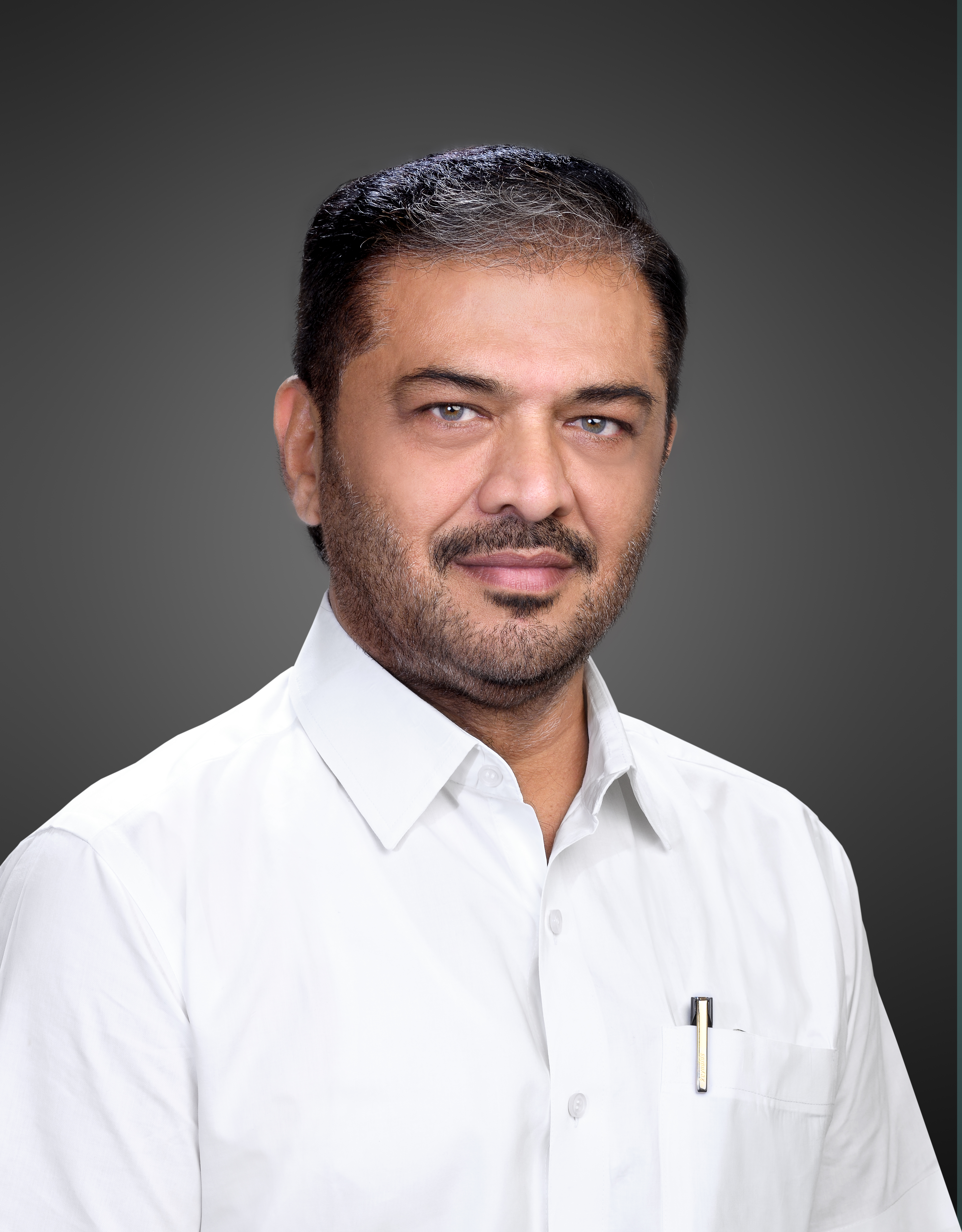

Member of Maharashtra Legislative Assembly
- In office (2004-2009), (2009-2014), (2014-2019), (2019 – 2023)
- Preceded by: Devrao Asole
- Succeeded by: Ashish Deshmukh
- Constituency: Savner
- In office (1995–1999)
- Preceded by: Ranjeet Deshmukh
- Succeeded by: Devrao Asole
- Constituency: Savner

Cabinet Minister Government of Maharashtra
- In office 30 December 2019 – 29 June 2022
- Minister: Animal Husbandry; Dairy Development; Sports and Youth Welfare
- Preceded by: Balasaheb Thorat; Subhash Desai
- Succeeded by: Radhakrishna Vikhe Patil; Girish Mahajan

Minister of State Government of Maharashtra
- In office 14 March 1995 – 31 January 1999
- Minister: Ministry of Transport (Maharashtra); Ministry of Power (Maharashtra)

Minister of State Government of Maharashtra
- In office 1996–1999
- Minister: Ministry of Ports Development (Maharashtra)

Personal details
- Born: 7 April 1961 (age 65) Nagpur, Maharashtra, India
- Party: Indian National Congress (2003-Present)
- Other political affiliations: Nationalist Congress Party (1999-2003)
- Spouse: Anuja Vijaykar
- Children: 2 daughters
- Parents: Chhatrapal Anandrao Kedar alias Babasaheb Kedar (father); leelabai Kedar (mother)
- Relatives: Sudhir Babasaheb Kedar (Brother)

Sunil Chhatrapal Kedar (born 7 April 1961) is a former Cabinet Minister in the Maharashtra government and Member Of Maharashtra Legislative AssemblyFrom Savner Assembly Constituency and an Indian politician of Indian National Congress who was born in Nagpur. Sunil Kedar is son of late former Maharashtra minister and pioneer of co-operative movement in Nagpur district, Chhatrapal Kedar (Also known as Babasaheb Kedar).

== Personal life ==
Sunil Kedar was born on 7 April 1961 in Nagpur. He is the son of former Minister Chhatrapal Kedar. He graduated in agricultural science and has obtained his Master of Business and Management. He is married to Anuja Vijaykar (daughter of Kundatai Vijaykar and granddaughter of Barrister S. K. Wankhede). The couple has two daughters named Purnima and Pallavi. He is a businessman and farmer by profession.

== Political career ==
Sunil Kedar's political journey started when he was elected in 1992 as a Nagpur Zilla Parishad Member. In 1995 in the 9th Maharashtra Legislative Assembly he was elected independently from Saoner Assembly Constituency. In 1995 Kedar was a Minister of State for the ministries of Ministry of Power and Ministry of Transport. And in 1996 he also became Minister of State for the ministry of Ports. Again In 2004 in the 11th Maharashtra Legislative Assembly he was elected independently from Saoner assembly constituency. In 2009 in the 12th Maharashtra Legislative Assembly he was elected from Saoner assembly constituency as an Indian National Congress candidate. And again in 2014 in 13th Maharashtra Legislative Assembly he was elected from Saoner assembly constituency as an Indian National Congress candidate.

In 2019 in the 14th Maharashtra Legislative Assembly he was elected from Saoner assembly constituency as an Indian national congress candidate and became cabinet minister of Maharashtra State.

According to several local news reporters and journalists Sunil Kedar is said Kingmaker or Masterstroke for Congress Party as he has a powerful hold in Nagpur Rural Area Politics be it Nagpur APMC Election, Gram Panchayat Elections, District Council (Zilla Parishad) Elections, Ramtek Lok Sabha Election 2024, and other Local Government Body Elections.

Sunil Kedar was disqualified as an Member of Maharashtra Legislative Assembly on 24 December 2023 following his conviction and five-year imprisonment term by Nagpur High Court in connection with a 25 year-old-case related to financial irregularities in Nagpur District Central Co-operative Bank (NDCCB) Scam.
