= Queer Azaadi Mumbai =

Annual LGBT event in Mumbai, India

Queer Azaadi Mumbai Pride March ("Azaadi" meaning "freedom" in Hindi and Urdu), also called Queer Azaadi March and Mumbai pride march, is an annual LGBTQIA pride parade that is held in the city of Mumbai, capital of Maharashtra, India. It usually begins from Gowalia Tank (popularly known as August Kranti Maidan) ending at Girgaum Chowpatty. It, along with the Pride Week, is organized by Queer Azaadi Mumbai (abbreviated as QAM), a collective of organizations and individuals working for the rights of LGBTQIA community. The participants of the march include people from the LGBTQIH community as well their "straight allies", from India and outside. In addition to being a celebration of queer pride, the pride march and related events are a platform to ask for equal rights.

== Objectives ==
The following are the demands and objectives of the Queer Azadi March:

- Equal rights for the LGBT community and an end to discrimination against members of the community.
- Constitutional protection against discrimination on the basis of gender and sexuality.
- Legal recognition for all members of the LGBTIQ community, and equal rights for those who do not fit the male-female classification.
- Sensitisation of society towards the rights and aspirations of the community, to put an end to practices like forced marriages. Specific sensitisation for the medical community regarding the treatment of community members.
- Elimination of violence, hate, homophobia and transphobia within families, educational institutions, workplaces and public places.

== History ==
Pride marches have been held annually in Mumbai since 2005, however, it got its official name Queer Azaadi March in 2008.

=== 2008 ===
The first Queer Azaadi March was held on 16 August, a day after the Independence Day of India, with about 500 people participating in it. It was flagged off by Indian actress Celina Jaitly. The theme of this march was freedom from Section 377 of Indian Penal Code (IPC). During the march, Manvendra Singh Gohil, known as "India's first gay prince" gave a speech and demanded an apology from the British for including Section 377 in IPC.

=== 2009 ===
The Pride parade was held on 16 August, with Celina Jaitly flagging off the march for the second year in a row. With over 500 people turning up, gay activists claimed it to be one of the biggest pride marches in the country.

=== 2011 ===
The fourth Queer Azaadi March was held on 29 January with the Queer Azaadi Mumbai Pride Week (from 22–29 January) preceding it. It was inaugurated by Anand Grover, founder of Lawyers’ Collective, who has also represented Naz Foundation since 2001. Another person to inaugurate was Vivek Patil, chief-executive of Humsafar Trust, the oldest LGBTQ organization in India. The Pride Week, held for the first time in the Mumbai march, included festivities, like QAM Mela and drag shows, play readings, shopping, panel discussions and films. There were also live music and dance concerts at the Carter Road open auditorium and the SNDT University at Juhu. This pride became famous for it Pride Week and because people came in large numbers, with only a few wearing masks and being open about their identity.

=== 2012 ===
The fifth pride march was also held on 28 January. This year witnessed Asia’s first flash mob at the Pride Week celebrations. More than 2000 queer individuals took part in the event that was a display of gay pride. As a part of the march, Queer Azadi Mumbai also organised queer games which was held on 15 January 2012.

In the run up to the Mumbai Queer Azaadi March 2012, the organizers held a live performance by the Hijra community and band "Agnee", at Carter Road Amphitheatre, on 5 Jan and a photo, Cartoon, Caricature Contest against prejudice. Pictures were displayed at Tata Institute of Social Sciences, Chembur on 21 and 22 January.

=== 2013 ===
The pride march was held on 2 February. The events leading up to the pride march included a kite festival, Queer Games, literary events and concerts.

=== 2014 ===
This year the pride parade was held on 1 February and became the first parade to happen after the Supreme Court judgement of upholding Section 377 of IPC.

=== 2015 ===
This parade was held on 31 January with more than 6000 people participating in it. There were also many parents there in support of their children and the LGBTQIH community. Vikram Doctor, a gay rights activist, claimed that while earlier there was an occasional presence of mothers, sisters or aunts of the a gay person, this time there were fathers and brothers too. The theme of this march was fakr (meaning pride). People could be seen dressed colorfully, with head gears, carrying balloons and flags of rainbow colors. There were also slogans, chanting and banners and posters opposing the Section 377 of IPC.

=== 2016 ===
The pride march was held on 6 February. It started from August Kranti Maidan continuing to Opera House, and then Kennedy Bridge, before looping back to the maidan. There were speeches from equal rights activists like Harish Iyer and Chitra Palekaras well as Manoj Bajpayee, the lead actor of Bollywood movie ‘Aligarh’. The crew of the movie and Mahendra Singh Gohil were part of the more than 7000 participants. The screenwriter of ‘Aligarh’, Apurva Asrani, even came out as gay for the first time during the walk. In the parade, people came dressed as drag queens, in jalabiyyahs, political figures from history and many other costumes.

=== 2017 ===
The ninth edition of the pride parade, held on 28 January, was the largest march of India yet with around 14000 people showing up. The Pride Week was also extended to a month long celebration, with new initiatives of community building and focusing on minorities within the LGBTQIH community. It was also Mumbai's first accessible pride walk. There were provisions like ramp to access the stage, sign language interpreters, and pick and drop services for people needing wheelchairs, as well as other volunteers to assist people with disabilities.

2018

The tenth edition of the Mumbai Pride Parade was held on 3 February 2018, with the theme #377QuitIndia. The theme, chosen by organisers Queer Azadi Mumbai, was a reference to Section 377 of the Indian Penal Code. This section criminalises "carnal intercourse against the order of nature", often used as an instrument to prosecute homosexuality. The March began from August Kranti Maidan (where the Quit India Movement was launched from) and ended at Girgaum Chowpatty beach. The Mumbai Pride organisers provided for sign language interpreters and mobi-cabs to enhance access to the disabled. This tenth edition of the Pride coincided with the 75th anniversary of the Quit India Movement and the organisers linked the event to the Quit India Movement to amplify the call for freedom from oppressive legislation. This was commemorated with the release of 'stamps' by organisers as each event logo. Indian corporate Godrej will be supporting the effort and organising some events. In addition to parties, a number of events were organised as part of a Pride month leading up to the Pride Parade:

- Sporting events for LBT (Lesbian-Bisexual-Transgender) women;
- 'Queer and Political', an event to analyse the political stance of the individuals within the LGBT community;
- Networking, talks and discussions, such as Karim Ladak speaking about his experience with LGBTIQ movements across the world;
- Theatre, such as 'Ek Madhav Baug', a play by Chetan Datar on the process of coming out;
- The 'Mr. Gay World India Finale'

With around 10,000 individuals, the event continued to show strong growth in the number of participants. Moreover, participants are increasingly comfortable revealing their identities, and fewer resorting to the use of masks.

=== 2020 ===
The police denied permission for the 2020 pride parade over concerns that it may be linked to the Citizenship Amendment Act protests.

=== 2024 ===
Mumbai Queer Pride March was held on 3 February with about 1000 people participating in it.
