= Nitin Raut =

Indian politician and social activist

Cabinet Minister of Renewable Energy and Energy Department of Maharashtra
- In office 28 November 2019 – 29 June 2022
- Governor: Bhagat Singh Koshyari
- Chief Minister: Uddhav Thackeray
- Deputy CM: Ajit Pawar
- Preceded by: Rahul gandhi
- Succeeded by: Saksham meshram

Guardian minister of Nagpur District Government of Maharashtra
- In office 09 January 2020 – 29 June 2022
- Constituency: Nagpur North

Member of the Maharashtra Legislative Assembly
- Incumbent
- Assumed office 26 November 2019
- Preceded by: Milind Mane
- Constituency: Nagpur North
- In office 1999–2014
- Preceded by: Badhel Bhola Janglu
- Succeeded by: Milind Mane

Personal details
- Born: 9 October 1952 (age 73) Nagpur, Maharashtra, India
- Party: Indian National Congress
- Occupation: Business
- Profession: Politician, Social activism

Nitin Kashinath Raut (born 9 October 1952) is an Indian politician, Businessman and social activist from Maharashtra. He was a former Cabinet minister in the Uddhav Thackeray ministry, Government of Maharashtra. He is the Working President of the Indian National Congress party Maharashtra and Chairman AICC (All India Congress Committee) for SC Department. He was the Cabinet Minister of Employment Guarantee and Water Conservation in the Government of Maharashtra, India until 2014.

== Political career ==
He was elected to the Maharashtra Legislative Assembly from Nagpur North constituency, in Nagpur district consecutively in the 1999, 2004 and 2009 elections. As of 2014 he served as a Maharashtra Cabinet Minister for Employment Guarantee Scheme and Water Conservation. He was former Minister for Animal Husbandry, Dairy Development, and Fisheries, Home, Jail, State Labor and Excise Department.

== Held positions ==
- 1999 – 2004: Member of Maharashtra Legislative Assembly (1st term)
- 2004 – 2009: Member of Maharashtra Legislative Assembly (2nd term)
- 2008 - 2009 : Maharashtra state minister for Department of Home, Prison, State Labor and Excise
- 2009 – 2014: Member of Maharashtra Legislative Assembly (3rd term)
- 2009 - 2014 : Maharashtra Cabinet minister for Horticulture, Fisheries, Animal Husbandry, Dairy Development, Employment Guarantee Scheme and Water Resources
- 2009 - 2014 : Appointed guardian minister of Yavatmal District
- 2019 – current : Member of Maharashtra Legislative Assembly (4th term)
- 2019 – 2019 : Cabinet minister for Public Works (excluding PSUs), Tribal Development, Women and Child Development, Textiles, Relief and Rehabilitation, Other Backward Classes, Socially and Educationally Backward Classes, Deprived Castes, Nomadic Tribes and Special Backward Classes Welfare
- 2019 – 2022 : Maharashtra Cabinet Minister for Renewable Energy and Energy Department
- 2020 - 2022 : Guardian minister of Nagpur district

=== Other positions ===
He became the Vice President of Maharashtra Pradesh Congress Committee (MPCC) in 2001.

He served as the General Secretary MPCC.

He is an active member of the MPCC Core Group and Media Committee.

He began serving as a member of the All India Congress Committee in 2001.

Empowered Action Group of Leaders and Experts (EAGLE) Committee Member

== Books and publications ==
- Buddhist Marriage and Succession Act, 2007
- Dr. Babasaheb Ambedkar's views on Birth Control and its Relevance with Modern India
- Buddhism and Dalit: Social Philosophy and Tradition

== Personal life ==
His family, inspired by B. R. Ambedkar, follows Buddhism and he strongly believes in Buddhist philosophy.

== Social work ==
Nitin Raut carries out social work through 'Sankalp', an NGO that works to aid Dalits and other downtrodden people. It provides relief to victims of natural and man-made calamities such as floods and communal riots.
