= V. G. Deshpande =

Indian politician

V G Deshpande

Member of Parliament, Lok Sabha
- In office 1952–1957
- Succeeded by: Vijaya Raje Scindia
- Constituency: Guna

Personal details
- Born: Mehkar, Maharashtra, India
- Party: Hindu Mahasabha
- Relations: Nagorao Ghanashyam Deshpande (brother) Sumatitai Suklikar (cousin)

Vishnu Ghanashyam Deshpande was an Indian politician. He was born in Mehkar, Buldhana district, Maharashtra. He was the general secretary of the Hindu Mahasabha.

V.G. Deshpande took part in the civil resisters' mission of the Hindu Mahasabha to Hyderabad State in March 1939, to protest against the Nizam's rule.

During the period of 1948 to 1952, V.G. Deshpande was repeatedly targeted by preventive arrests. On 27 January 1948 he had denounced Mahatma Gandhi, claiming Gandhi was responsible for the Partition of India. After the murder of Gandhi three days later by a Hindu Mahasabha member, Deshpande was arrested.

In the 1951–52 Indian general election, V.G. Deshpande managed to get elected from two Lok Sabha constituencies (Gwalior and Guna). In Guna he obtained 56,518 votes (40.70% of the votes in the constituency), defeating the Indian National Congress candidate Gopi Krishna Vijayvargiya. In Gwailor he got 65,695 votes (45.49%), defeating the Vaidehi Charan Parashar. He renounced his Gwailor seat, to enable Hindu Mahasabha president Narayan Bhaskar Khare to contest it in a by-election.

V.G. Deshpande lost his parliamentary seat in the 1957 general election to Vijaya Raje Scindia of INC. He finished second with 58,521 votes (33.04% of the votes in Guna). He later joined the Bharatiya Jana Sangh.

In early 1964, V.G. Deshpande called for on the Indian and Pakistani governments to initiate a population exchange, transporting the Hindu minority of Pakistan to India and expelling the Muslims of West Bengal and Assam to Pakistan.

V. G. Deshpande took part in the foundation of the Vishva Hindu Parishad in 1964.

His brother, Nagorao Ghanashyam Deshpande (1909-2000), was a noted Marathi poet. His cousin, Sumati Sukalikar, was also a leader of Bharatiya Jana Sangh in Nagpur, who contested a couple of elections unsuccessfully.
