= Tukaram Mundhe =

Indian civil servant (born 1975)

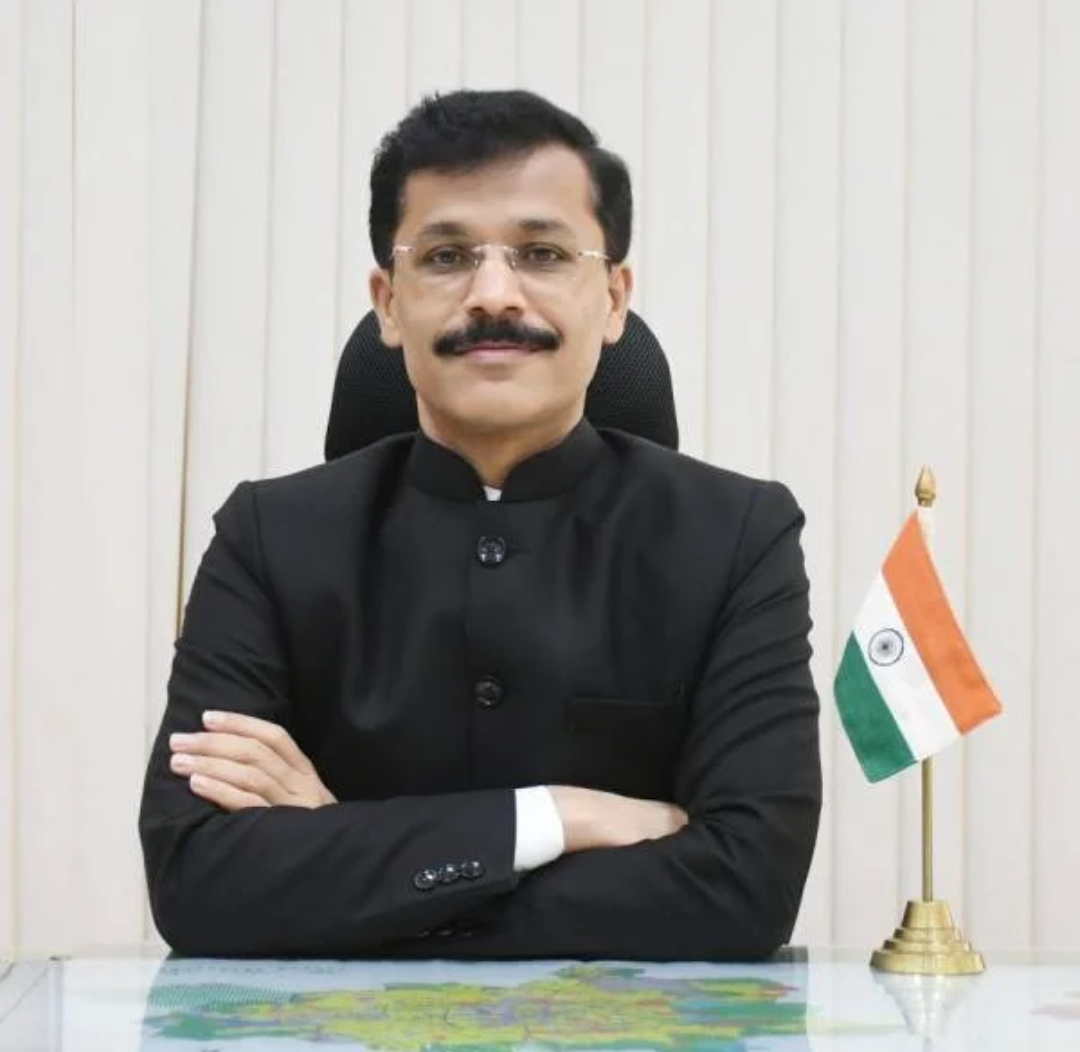

Commissioner, Food and Drug Administration, Maharashtra
- Incumbent
- Assumed office 2026

District Collector, Solapur
- In office 2014–2016

Personal details
- Born: 3 June 1975 (age 51) Beed district, Maharashtra, India
- Education: (B.A.) (M.A.); Dr. Babasaheb Ambedkar Marathwada University
- Occupation: Public servant, Government official
- Known for: Administrative reforms and public-service initiatives

Tukaram Mundhe (born 3 June 1975) is an Indian Administrative Service officer of the Maharashtra Cadre, who is currently serving as the Commissioner of Food and Drug Administration, Maharashtra. He was also named member-secretary of a five-member inquiry committee chaired by former judge Dilip Bhosale to investigate alleged examination paper leaks and other irregularities in the commission's functioning.

== Early and personal life ==
Tukaram Haribhau Mundhe was born on 3 June 1975 in Beed, Marathwada, Maharashtra. His father, Haribhau, was a farmer, while his mother, Aasrabai, was a homemaker. He grew up working on his family's subsistence farm and sold vegetables. As a child, he would walk barefoot to his Zila Parishad High School. Seeing his family's difficulties inspired him to join the Indian Administrative Service. His elder brother, Ashok, was the first from their village to go to a college for education, and funded Tukaram's education.

In 1996, Mundhe earned a bachelor's degree from the Government College of Arts and Science, Aurangabad. He completed his Master of Arts in Political science from Dr. Babasaheb Ambedkar Marathwada University in 1998.

Without any coaching, he cleared the UPSC Civil Service Aptitude Test in 2004, securing the 20th rank in the country. He joined the Maharashtra cadre of IAS in 2005.

As of 2026, Mundhe is the father of two teenagers.

== Career ==
While Mundhe has been awarded and gained significant recognition for his work, his approach has not been received well. As of August 2026, he had been transferred 25 times in 21 years of service, and has not been able to complete a full tenure in any of his postings. He is sometimes referred to as "Singham", after the Bollywood film character from the movie of the same name. For his work in conservation of water, he has also been referred to as the "waterman of Maharashtra".

As part of his first posting in Solapur, he opposed the sand mafia, facing death threats. In 2016, when posted as the Municipal Commissioner of Navi Mumbai, he opposed two multi-crore projects that had already been approved, stating them as unnecessary and redirecting the funds to public infrastructure and to make the city more accessible for persons with disabilities. As part of his "Walk with the Commissioner" initiative, he would go for morning walks every Sunday, inviting citizens to join him to discuss public issues. While corporators across political parties called for a bandh against him, citizens started an online petition and organized a march in his support, gathering over 6000 signatures. He was transferred in 2017.

Later, in 2017-18, he laid off 158 contract drivers of the Pune Mahanagar Parivahan Mahamandal Limited (PMPML) for chronic absenteeism. This was met with opposition from unions. He also hiked the fare of monthly passes of senior citizens. He was transferred to Nashik after nine months. In 2022, when he was made the Health Commissioner, he took steps against corruption and took action against government doctors who ran private clinics during government working hours. Surprise inspections were ordered of hospitals and as first warning, salaries of one day was ordered to be deducted for doctors and staff who were absent. He was transferred in two months.

As the Commissioner of Food and Drug Administration, Maharashtra, in 2026, he closed multiple popular eateries for violations of the Food Safety and Standards Act, 2006. His 2026 enforcement drive triggered broader operational impact across India, with media reporting proactive internal audits in commercial kitchens and public calls for similar administrative measures in Delhi-NCR.

=== Positions held ===
Following is the list of positions held by Mundhe in chronological order.

- District Collector of Solapur (2014-16)
- CEO, Khadi and Village Industries Commission (KVIC)
- 2017 - Municipal Commissioner, Navi Mumbai Municipal Corporation (NMMC)
- 2017-18 - Managing Director, Pune Mahanagar Parivahan Mahamandal Limited (PMPML)
- 2018 - Municipal Commissioner, Nashik Municipal Corporation (NMC)
- 2018 - Additional Secretary, Planning, Mantralay, Government of Maharashtra
- 2020 - Municipal Commissioner, Nagpur Municipal Corporation
- Oct 2022 - Nov 2022 - Health Services Commissioner of Maharashtra
- 2026 - Commissioner of Food and Drug Administration, Maharashtra
- October 2026- Secretary to Maharashtra Public Service Commission

== Awards and accolades ==
In 2015-16, he received the Best Collector Award from the Government of Maharashtra. He was also awarded the National Award for Social Justice and Empowerment by the Ministry of Social Justice and Empowerment. While he was the Municipal Commissioner, the Navi Mumbai Municipal Corporation received the SKOCH Order of Merit for its seismic retrofitting initiatives and EToilets. Further, he was awarded the National Award for the Best Integrated Traffic Management System in 2017.

== Legacy ==
A book on his life was released on 17 July 2026. Written by author-journalist Shafi Pathan, it is titled Tukaram.
