= Sivaram =

Sivaram may refer to:

- Peketi Sivaram, South Indian actor and director
- Taraki Sivaram or Dharmeratnam Sivaram, Tamil journalist of Sri Lanka
- Sivaramapuram, village panchayat in Salur mandal of Vizianagaram district in Andhra Pradesh, India

== See also ==
- Shivram, an Indian male given name
- Sivaraman, an Indian surname
- Sivaramakrishnan (disambiguation)
- Sewraam Rambaran Mishre (1915–1964), Indo-Surinamese physician and politician, deputy prime minister
- Sewram Gobin (born 1983), Indo-Mauritian footballer
