= Sindkhed Raja Assembly constituency =

Assembly constituency in Maharashtra

Coordinates: 19.96°N 76.12°E

Sindkhed Raja
- Constituency No. 24 for the Maharashtra Legislative Assembly

Constituency details
- Country: India
- Region: Western India
- State: Maharashtra
- District: Buldhana
- Lok Sabha constituency: Buldhana
- Established: 1978
- Total electors: 324,075
- Reservation: None

Member of Legislative Assembly
- 15th Maharashtra Legislative Assembly
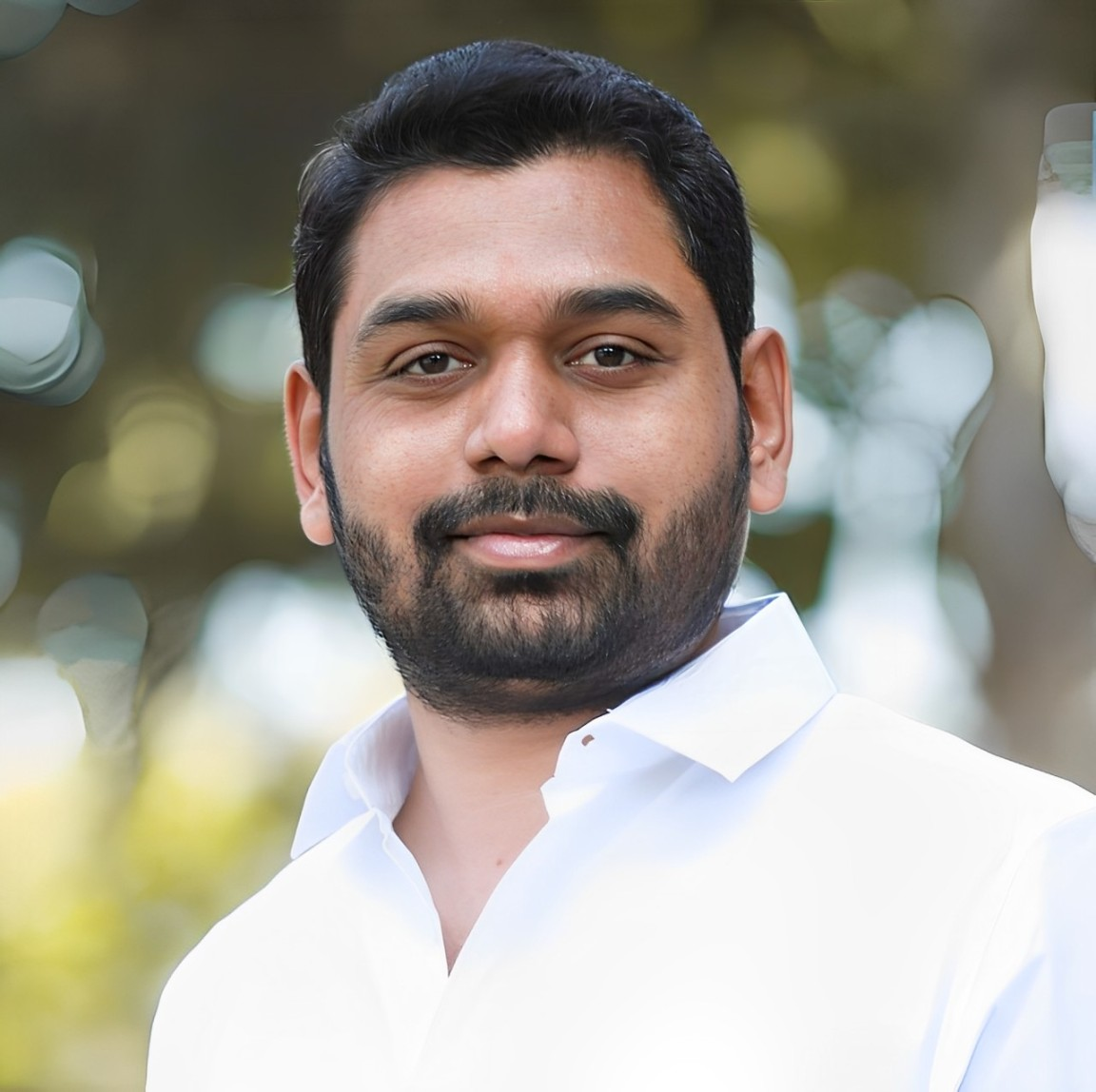
- Incumbent Manoj Kayande
- Party: NCP
- Alliance: NDA
- Elected year: 2024

Sindkhed Raja Assembly constituency is one of the 288 constituencies of the Maharashtra Vidhan Sabha and one of the seven which are located in Buldhana district.

== Overview ==
It is a segment of Buldhana Lok Sabha constituency, along with five other Vidhan Sabha (Legislative Assembly) constituencies, namely Buldhana, Chikhali, Mehkar, Khamgaon and Jalgaon (Jamod).

As per orders of Delimitation of Parliamentary and Assembly constituencies Order, 2008, No. 24 Sindkhed Raja Assembly constituency is composed of the following: 1. Deolgaon Raja Tehsil, 2. Sindkhed Raja Tehsil, 3. Chikhli Tehsil (Part), Revenue Circle - Mera and 4. Lonar Tehsil (Part), Revenue Circle Bibi. of Buldhana district.

== Members of the Legislative Assembly ==
Year	Member	Party
1978	Jayawantrao Kharat	Indian National Congress (I)
1980	Bhaskarrao Shingne	Peasants and Workers Party
1985	Totaram Kayande	Indian Congress (Socialist)
1990	Totaram Kayande	Independent
1995	Rajendra Shingne	Independent
1999	Rajendra Shingne	Nationalist Congress Party
2004	Rajendra Shingne	Nationalist Congress Party
2009	Rajendra Shingne	Nationalist Congress Party
2014	Shashikant Khedekar	Shiv Sena
2019	Rajendra Shingne	Nationalist Congress Party
2024	Manoj Kayande	Nationalist Congress Party

== Election results ==
=== Assembly Election 2024 ===
2024 Maharashtra Legislative Assembly election : Sindkhed Raja
Party	Candidate	Votes	%	±%
NCP	Manoj Devanand Kayande	73,413	31.96	New
NCP-SP	Dr. Rajendra Bhaskarrao Shingane	68,763	29.93	New
SS	Dr. Shashikant Narsingrao Khedekar	60,635	26.39	▼10.04
VBA	Savita Shivaji Mundhe	16,658	7.25	▼12.72
RSPS	Princ Dattu Rambhau Chavan	3,535	1.54	New
SBP	Dattatraya Dagdu Kakde	2,509	1.09	New
NOTA	None of the Above	742	0.32	▼0.49
Margin of victory		4,650	2.02	▼2.45
Turnout		230,471	71.12	▲7.00
Total valid votes		229,729		
Registered electors		324,075		
NCP gain from NCP		Swing	▼8.96	

=== Assembly Election 2019 ===
2019 Maharashtra Legislative Assembly election : Sindkhed Raja
Party	Candidate	Votes	%	±%
NCP	Dr. Rajendra Bhaskarrao Shingane	81,701	40.91	▲20.58
SS	Dr. Shashikant Narsingrao Khedekar	72,763	36.44	▲1.31
VBA	Savita Shivaji Mundhe	39,875	19.97	New
NOTA	None of the Above	1,616	0.81	▲0.11
BSP	Shivshankar Dattatray Wayal	1,315	0.66	▼3.24
Margin of victory		8,938	4.48	▼5.84
Turnout		201,390		▼0.47
Total valid votes		199,699		
Registered electors		312,571		
NCP gain from SS		Swing	▲5.79	

=== Assembly Election 2014 ===
2014 Maharashtra Legislative Assembly election : Sindkhed Raja
Party	Candidate	Votes	%	±%
SS	Dr. Shashikant Narsingrao Khedekar	64,203	35.12	▲1.74
BJP	Dr. Ganesh Baburao Mante	45,349	24.81	New
NCP	Rekha Purushorttam Khedekar	37,161	20.33	▼27.04
MNS	Vinodbhau Laxman Wagh	13,533	7.40	▼6.98
INC	Pradip Baburao Nagre	7,261	3.97	New
BSP	Vasantrao Rajaram Magar	7,121	3.90	▲1.22
Republican Sena	Panditrao Govindrao Khandare	4,565	2.50	New
NOTA	None of the Above	1,279	0.70	New
Margin of victory		18,854	10.31	▼3.67
Turnout		184,122		▼1.94
Total valid votes		182,787		
Registered electors		284,006		
SS gain from NCP		Swing	▼12.24	

=== Assembly Election 2009 ===
2009 Maharashtra Legislative Assembly election : Sindkhed Raja
Party	Candidate	Votes	%	±%
NCP	Dr. Rajendra Bhaskarrao Shingane	81,808	47.37	▲1.54
SS	Dr. Shashikant Narsingrao Khedekar	57,658	33.39	▼3.72
MNS	Vinodbhau Laxman Wagh	24,833	14.38	New
BSP	A. Hafiz A. Aziz	4,614	2.67	New
Independent	Dilip Tryambak Kale	2,328	1.35	New
Margin of victory		24,150	13.98	▲5.26
Turnout		172,758	66.32	▼8.33
Total valid votes		172,702		
Registered electors		260,494		▲24.55
NCP hold		Swing	▲1.54	

=== Assembly Election 2004 ===
2004 Maharashtra Legislative Assembly election : Sindkhed Raja
Party	Candidate	Votes	%	±%
NCP	Dr. Rajendra Bhaskarrao Shingane	71,527	45.83	▼3.69
SS	Dr. Shashikant Narsingrao Khedekar	57,918	37.11	▲20.78
BBM	Abhay Jagarao Chavan	16,734	10.72	New
Independent	Sekwsiddik Shaikha Kureshi	7,266	4.66	New
Independent	Dr. Dilip Atmaram Kharat	1,423	0.91	New
Independent	Kharat Shaligram Nanabhau	1,215	0.78	New
Margin of victory		13,609	8.72	▼6.99
Turnout		156,083	74.63	▲5.78
Total valid votes		156,083		
Registered electors		209,156		▲16.68
NCP hold		Swing	▼3.69	

=== Assembly Election 1999 ===
1999 Maharashtra Legislative Assembly election : Sindkhed Raja
Party	Candidate	Votes	%	±%
NCP	Dr. Rajendra Bhaskarrao Shingane	61,111	49.52	New
INC	Kayande Nandabai Devanand	41,721	33.81	▲5.64
SS	Chhagan Gopalrao Mehetre	20,148	16.33	▲14.31
Margin of victory		19,390	15.71	▼6.94
Turnout		129,644	72.32	▼11.56
Total valid votes		123,410		
Registered electors		179,262		▲2.50
NCP gain from Independent		Swing	▼1.30	

=== Assembly Election 1995 ===
1995 Maharashtra Legislative Assembly election : Sindkhed Raja
Party	Candidate	Votes	%	±%
Independent	Dr. Rajendra Bhaskarrao Shingane	71,465	50.82	New
INC	Kayande Totaram Tukaram	39,613	28.17	▲12.45
BBM	Magar Vasantrao Rajaram	19,086	13.57	New
SS	More Witthal Bajirao	2,837	2.02	▼15.25
Independent	Jadhao Wamanrao Ramchandra	2,752	1.96	New
BSP	Kharat Chagan Bhaurao	881	0.63	New
Independent	Sable Daguba Balaji	879	0.63	New
Margin of victory		31,852	22.65	▲18.56
Turnout		143,402	81.99	▲10.20
Total valid votes		140,626		
Registered electors		174,893		▲12.55
Independent hold		Swing	▲23.37	

=== Assembly Election 1990 ===
1990 Maharashtra Legislative Assembly election : Sindkhed Raja
Party	Candidate	Votes	%	±%
Independent	Kayande Totaram Tukaram	29,949	27.45	New
JD	Jadhao Wamanrao Ramchandra	25,489	23.36	New
SS	Magar Vasantrao Rajaram	18,834	17.26	New
INC	Khandebharad Tukaram Narayan	17,152	15.72	▼25.26
BRP	Rathod Thawaraji Raghoji	12,914	11.84	New
Independent	Kasture Vijay Kumar Sampatrao	1,007	0.92	New
Margin of victory		4,460	4.09	▼3.02
Turnout		110,665	71.22	▼1.52
Total valid votes		109,094		
Registered electors		155,387		▲20.41
Independent gain from IC(S)		Swing	▼20.63	

=== Assembly Election 1985 ===
1985 Maharashtra Legislative Assembly election : Sindkhed Raja
Party	Candidate	Votes	%	±%
IC(S)	Kayande Totaram Tukaram	44,513	48.09	New
INC	Shingane Bhaskarrao Sampatrao	37,935	40.98	New
Independent	Jadhao Gangadhar Nagorao	6,828	7.38	New
Independent	Gawai Deorao Bhiwaji	1,831	1.98	New
Independent	Bondre Bhagwanappa Thamaappa	590	0.64	New
Margin of victory		6,578	7.11	▼4.12
Turnout		94,314	73.09	▲4.02
Total valid votes		92,567		
Registered electors		129,046		▲14.51
IC(S) gain from PWPI		Swing	▼4.88	

=== Assembly Election 1980 ===
1980 Maharashtra Legislative Assembly election : Sindkhed Raja
Party	Candidate	Votes	%	±%
PWPI	Shingane Bhaskarrao Sampatrao	40,420	52.97	▲28.01
INC(I)	Jaywantrao Kaluji Kharat	31,854	41.74	▲7.45
BJP	Ware Ambadas Govind	1,447	1.90	New
Independent	Kharat Trambak Ramrao	811	1.06	New
Independent	Maske Atmaram Sitaram	795	1.04	New
RPI	Ghumre Januji Gyanuji	694	0.91	New
Margin of victory		8,566	11.23	▲1.89
Turnout		78,018	69.23	▼10.28
Total valid votes		76,307		
Registered electors		112,691		▲9.09
PWPI gain from INC(I)		Swing	▲18.67	

=== Assembly Election 1978 ===
1978 Maharashtra Legislative Assembly election : Sindkhed Raja
Party	Candidate	Votes	%	±%
INC(I)	Kharat Jayawantrao Kaluji	27,632	34.30	New
PWPI	Shingane Bhaskarrao Sampatrao	20,112	24.96	New
Independent	Sangale Wamanrao Kisanrao	14,923	18.52	New
Independent	Deshmukh Appasaheb Narayanrao	9,228	11.45	New
INC	Chavan Jagarao Raoji	5,527	6.86	New
JP	Karimkhan Mohammadkhan	2,857	3.55	New
Margin of victory		7,520	9.33	
Turnout		82,640	80.00	
Total valid votes		80,570		
Registered electors		103,298		
INC(I) win (new seat)				

== See also ==
- Sindkhed Raja
- Lonar
- Deulgaon Raja
