= Shivram =

Shivram is a given name and a surname. Notable people with the name include:

- Shivram Shankar Apte, aka Dadasaheb Apte (1907–1985), founder and first General Secretary of the Vishva Hindu Parishad
- Vaman Shivram Apte (1858–1892), Indian lexicographer and a professor of Sanskrit at Pune's Fergusson College
- Shivram Bhoje (born 1942), Indian nuclear scientist who worked in the field of fast-breeder nuclear reactor technology
- Shivram Dattatray Joshi (1926–2013), Indian Sanskrit scholar and grammarian based in Pune, Maharashtra
- Shivram Karanth (1902–1997), Indian polymath, novelist in Kannada language, playwright and ecological conservationist
- Yadav Shivram Mahajan (born 1911), member of the 4th Lok Sabha of India from the Buldhana constituency of Maharashtra
- Balakrishna Shivram Moonje (1872–1948), leader of the Hindu Mahasabha in India
- Shivram Mahadev Paranjape (1864–1929), Marathi writer, scholar, orator, journalist and freedom fighter
- Shivram Dattatreya Phadnis (born 1925), cartoonist and illustrator from India
- Shivram Rango Rane (1901–1970), politician from Bombay State
- Purushottam Shivram Rege (1910–1978), Marathi writer from Maharashtra, India
- Ivaturi Shivram (born 1954), former Indian cricket umpire
- K. Shivram (born 1953), Indian actor, politician and former bureaucrat
- Palwankar Shivram (1878–1941), Indian cricketer
- Pratap Shivram Singh, Indian politician, social worker and British Indian Army soldier

== See also ==
- Shiv Ram
- Shivam (disambiguation)
- Shivaram
