= Sanjay Raimulkar =

Indian politician

Dr. Sanjay Raimulkar

Member of Legislative Assembly of Maharashtra
- In office (2009-2014), (2014-2019), (2019 – 2024)
- Constituency: Mehkar

Personal details
- Born: 3 August 1964 (age 61) Nandra Dhande, Mehkar, Buldhana district, Maharashtra
- Party: Shiv Sena
- Spouse: Ranjana S. Raimulkar
- Children: 1 Son (Neeraj), 1 Daughter (Nayan)

Sanjay Bhashkar Raimulkar is a Shiv Sena politician from Buldhana district, Maharashtra. He is a member of the 14th Maharashtra Legislative Assembly. He represents the Mehkar Assembly constituency as member of Shiv Sena. He has been elected to Maharashtra Legislative Assembly for two consecutive terms in 2009 and 2014.

== Positions held ==
- 2008: Sabhapati, Krishi Utpanna Bazaar Samiti, Mehkar
- 2009: Elected to Maharashtra Legislative Assembly (1st term)
- 2014: Re-elected to Maharashtra Legislative Assembly (2nd term)
- 2019: Re-elected to Maharashtra Legislative Assembly (3rd term)

== See also ==
- Buldhana Lok Sabha constituency
- Mehkar Assembly constituency
