= Khudnapur =

Khudnapur खुदनापूर
- Location in Maharashtra, India
- Coordinates: 20°19′5″N 76°28′43″E
- Country: India
- State: Maharashtra
- District: Buldhana

Government
  - Body: Gat Grampanchayat, Thar-Bardapur

Population (2011)
  - Total: 118
- PIN: 443301
- Telephone code: (07268)
- Vehicle registration: MH-28
- Nearest city: Chikhli, Mehkar, Khamgaon.

Khudnapur is a village in Mehkar taluka of Buldhana district of Maharashtra. It is a part of Thar-Bardapur Gat Grampanchayat. The village had a population of 118 as per census of 2011.

Shri. Vijay Mohrut is Sarpanch of the village in 2019.
