= Shashikant Narsingrao Khedekar =

Indian politician

Dr. Shashikant Khedekar

MLA in 13th Legislative Assembly of Maharashtra
- In office October 2014 – October 2019
- Preceded by: Dr. Shingne Rajendra Bhaskarrao
- Succeeded by: Dr. Shingne Rajendra Bhaskarrao
- Constituency: Sindkhed Raja

Personal details
- Born: 15 December 1954 (age 71) Buldana
- Party: Shiv Sena

Shashikant Narsingrao Khedekar is Shiv Sena politician from Buldhana district, Maharashtra. He is a member of the 13th Maharashtra Legislative Assembly and represents the Sindkhed Raja Assembly Constituency.

== Positions held ==
- 2014: Elected to Maharashtra Legislative Assembly

== See also ==
- Buldhana Lok Sabha constituency
