= Nagorao Ghanashyam Deshpande =

Marathi poet, lyricist, writer and actor

Nagorao Ghanshyam Deshpande
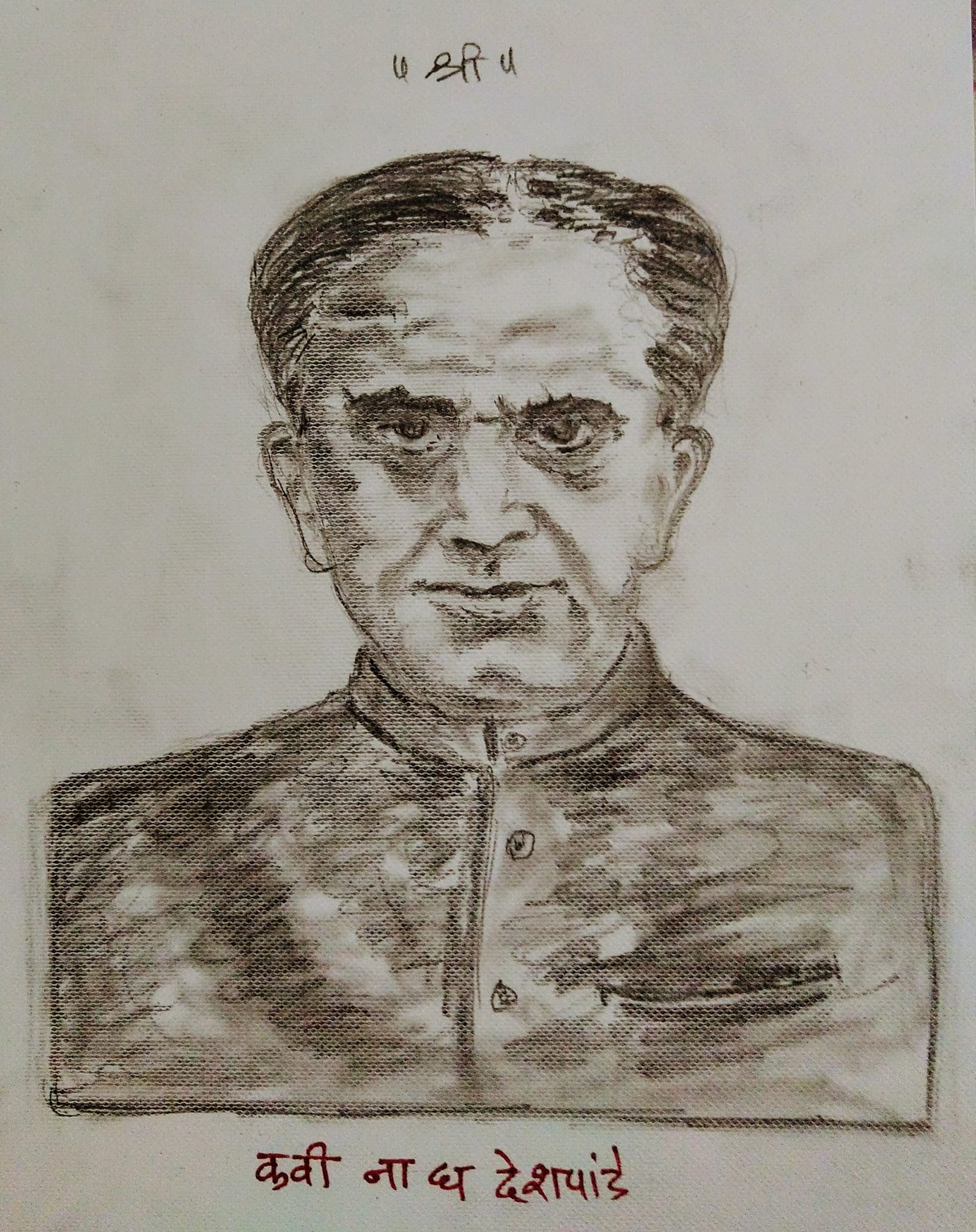
- Sketch of N G Deshpande
- Born: 21 August 1909; Shendurjan, Buldhana district, Maharashtra
- Died: 2000 (aged 90–91)
- Occupation: Poet
- Relatives: V. G. Deshpande (brother); Sumatitai Suklikar (cousin)
- Writing career
- Notable awards: Sahitya Akademi Award

Nagorao Ghanashyam Deshpande (1909–2000) was a Marathi poet from Maharashtra, India.

Deshpande was born on 21 August 1909 in the town of Shendurjan in Buldhana District of Maharashtra. He died on 10 May 2000.

He lived most of his life in the town of Mehkar, also in Buldhana District. Because of his Preterm birth, he suffered considerable sickness through much of his life of 91 years. His brother (V G Deshpande) and cousin (Sumati Suklikar) were politicians with Bharatiya Jana Sangh. Poet Deshpande's poems have been set to music, mainly by singer-composer G N Joshi.

Deshpande received in 1986 a Sahitya Akademi award for his collection of poems Khoon Gathi.

The following are the titles of the five collections of his poems:

- Sheel (1954)
- Abhisar (1963)
- Khoon Gathi (1985)
- Gumphan (1996)
- Kanchanicha Mahal (1996)
