= Sivaramakrishnan =

Sivaramakrishnan may refer to:

- Laxman Sivaramakrishnan, Indian cricketer
- Vidyut Sivaramakrishnan, Indian cricketer
- Sivaramakrishnan Balachandar, Indian-American physicist

== See also ==
- Sivaram (disambiguation)
- Sivaraman, an Indian surname
