= Buldhana Lok Sabha constituency =

Lok Sabha constituency in Maharashtra

Coordinates: 20.5°N 76.2°E

Buldhana
- Lok Sabha constituency
- Map of Buldhana Lok Sabha constituency

Constituency details
- Country: India
- Region: Western India
- State: Maharashtra
- Assembly constituencies: Buldhana; Chikhali; Sindkhed Raja; Mehkar; Khamgaon; Jalgaon (Jamod)
- Established: 1952
- Reservation: None

Member of Parliament
- 18th Lok Sabha
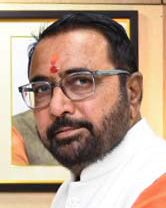
- Incumbent Prataprao Ganpatrao Jadhav
- Party: SHS
- Alliance: NDA
- Elected year: 2024
- Preceded by: Anandrao Adsul

Buldhana Lok Sabha constituency is one of the 48 Lok Sabha (parliamentary) constituencies of Maharashtra state in western India. This constituency largely represents Buldhana district in the Lok Sabha of Indian parliament, except Malkapur Assembly constituency, which is part of Raver Lok Sabha constituency from Jalgaon district of Khandesh region.

== Assembly segments ==
Presently, after the implementation of the Presidential notification on delimitation on 19 February 2008, Buldhana Lok Sabha constituency comprises six Vidhan Sabha (legislative assembly) segments. These segments with constituency numbers and reservation (if any) are:

No	Name	District	Member	Party	Leading (in 2024)
22	Buldhana	Buldhana	Sanjay Gaikwad	SHS	SS(UBT)
23	Chikhali	Buldhana	Shweta Mahale	BJP	SS(UBT)
24	Sindkhed Raja	Buldhana	Manoj Kayande	NCP	IND
25	Mehkar (SC)	Buldhana	Siddharth Kharat	SS(UBT)	SHS
26	Khamgaon	Buldhana	Akash Fundkar	BJP	SHS
27	Jalgaon (Jamod)	Buldhana	Sanjay Kute	BJP	SHS

== Members of Parliament ==
Year	Name	Party
1952	Gopalrao Bajirao Khedkar	Indian National Congress
1952	Laxman Shrawan Bhatkar	Indian National Congress
1957	Shivram Rango Rane	Indian National Congress
1962	Shivram Rango Rane	Indian National Congress
1967	Shivram Rango Rane	Indian National Congress
1970^	Yadav Shivram Mahajan	Indian National Congress
1971	Yadav Shivram Mahajan	Indian National Congress
1977	Daulat Gunaji Gawai	Republican Party of India (Khobragade)
1980	Balkrishna Ramchandra Wasnik	Indian National Congress (I)
1984	Mukul Wasnik	Indian National Congress
1989	Sukhdev Nanaji Kale	Bharatiya Janata Party
1991	Mukul Wasnik	Indian National Congress
1996	Anandrao Vithoba Adsul	Shiv Sena
1998	Mukul Wasnik	Indian National Congress
1999	Anandrao Vithoba Adsul	Shiv Sena
2004	Anandrao Vithoba Adsul	Shiv Sena
2009	Prataprao Jadhav	Shiv Sena
2014	Prataprao Jadhav	Shiv Sena
2019	Prataprao Jadhav	Shiv Sena
2024	Prataprao Jadhav	Shiv Sena

^ - bypoll

== Election results ==
=== General election 2024 ===
2024 Indian general election: Buldhana
Party	Candidate	Votes	%	±%
SHS	Prataprao Jadhav	349,867	31.53	▼15.06
SS(UBT)	Narendra Khedekar	320,388	28.88	New entry
Independent	Ravikant Tupkar	249,963	22.53	New entry
VBA	Vasantrao Magar	98,441	8.87	▼6.54
Independent	Sandeep Shelke	13,050	1.20	New entry
NOTA	None of the above	3,786	0.34	N/A
Margin of victory		29,479	2.66	▼9.24
Turnout		11,09,496	62.24	▼1.36
SHS gain from SS		Swing		

=== General election 2019 ===
2019 Indian general election: Buldhana
Party	Candidate	Votes	%	±%
SS	Prataprao Jadhav	521,977	46.59%	▼5.42
NCP	Rajendra Shingne	388,690	34.69%	▼1.02
VBA	Baliram Sirskar	172,627	15.41%	New entry
BSP	Abdul Hafeez Abdul Aziz	6,565	0.60%	▼
BMP	Pratap Pandharinath Patil	4,307	0.39%	▼
Margin of victory		133,587	11.90%	▼4.40
Turnout		11,21,151	63.60%	▲2.25
SS hold		Swing		

=== General election 2014 ===
2014 Indian general election: Buldhana
Party	Candidate	Votes	%	±%
SS	Prataprao Jadhav	509,145	52.01%	▲10.56
NCP	Krushanrao Ingle	3,49,566	35.71%	▼2.45
Independent	Balasaheb Darade	29,793	3.04%	N/A
BSP	Abdul Hafeez Abdul Aziz	33,783	3.45%	▼6.13
BMP	Sandesh Ashok Ambedkar	7,927	0.82%	▼
NOTA	None of the Above	10,546	1.08%	N/A
Margin of victory		159,579	16.30%	▲13.01
Turnout		978,876	61.35%	
SS hold		Swing		

=== General election 2009 ===
2009 Indian general election: Buldhana
Party	Candidate	Votes	%	±%
SS	Prataprao Jadhav	353,671	41.45%	
NCP	Rajendra Shingne	325,593	38.16%	
BSP	Vasantrao Dandge	81,763	9.58%	
BBM	Ravindra Tulshiramji Dhokne	31,034	3.64%	
Independent	Sy. Bilal Sy. Usman	16,405	1.92%	
Independent	Chhagan Babulal Rathod	11,989	1.41%	
Margin of victory		28,078	3.29%	
Turnout		853,380	61.72%	
SS hold		Swing		

=== General election 2004 ===
2004 Indian general election: Buldhana (SC)
Party	Candidate	Votes	%	±%
SS	Anandrao Adsul	369,975	48.60%	
INC	Mukul Wasnik	310,068	40.73%	
BBM	Bhimrao Senu Jadhao	21,197	2.78%	
BSP	Sitaram Keruji Kankal	18,241	2.40%	
Independent	Devidas Piraji Sarkate	17,455	2.29%	
Margin of victory		59,907	7.87%	
Turnout		761,264%	63.50%	
SS hold		Swing		

=== General election 1999 ===
1999 Indian general election: Buldhana (SC)
Party	Candidate	Votes	%	±%
SS	Anandrao Adsul	294,922	41.82	
INC	Mukul Wasnik	249,915	35.44	
NCP	Sahebrao Ashruji Sardar	1,33,165	18.88%	
Independent	Baliram Chavan	18,948	2.69%	
Margin of victory		45,007	6.38%	
Turnout		7,43,613	71.56%	
SS gain from INC		Swing		

=== General election 1998 ===
1998 Indian general election: Buldhana (SC)
Party	Candidate	Votes	%	±%
INC	Mukul Wasnik	348,094	51.82%	
SS	Anandrao Adsul	294,537	43.85%	
Jharkhand Party	Panditrao Khandare	14,006	2.09%	
JD	Gangadharrao Gade	5,431	0.81%	
BSP	Krushnarao Mohodkar	3,131	0.47%	
Margin of victory		53,557	7.97	
Turnout		671,692	66.48	
INC gain from SS		Swing		

=== General election 1996 ===
1996 Indian general election: Buldhana (SC)
Party	Candidate	Votes	%	±%
SS	Anandrao Adsul	281,953	47.50	
INC	Mukul Wasnik	212,522	35.81	
JD	Suresh Umale	51,499	8.68%	
Margin of victory		69,431	11.70%	
Turnout		593,540	61.72%	
SS gain from INC		Swing		

=== General election 1991 ===
1991 Indian general election: Buldhana (SC)
Party	Candidate	Votes	%	±%
INC	Mukul Wasnik	213,495	46.53	
BJP	P. G. Gawai	176,404	38.44	
RPI	Suryabhan Shinde	14,794	3.22	
BRP	R.S. Sawadekar	12,444	2.71	
Margin of victory		37,091	8.09	
Turnout		458,866	50.83	
INC gain from BJP		Swing		

=== General election 1989 ===
1989 Indian general election: Buldhana (SC)
Party	Candidate	Votes	%	±%
BJP	Sukhdev Kale	297,984	50.84	
INC	Mukul Wasnik	231,990	39.58	
BRP	Dharma Kharate	31,446	5.36	
DMM	Ashok Wankhede	7,038	1.20	
Margin of victory		65,994	11.26	
Turnout		586,168	66.19	
BJP gain from INC		Swing		

=== General election 1984 ===
1984 Indian general election: Buldhana (SC)
Party	Candidate	Votes	%	±%
INC	Mukul Wasnik	166,281	35.91	
IC(S)	Sukhdev Kale	118,223	25.53	
BJP	Daulat Gunaji Gawai	73,036	15.77	
Independent	Laxman Ghumare	45,762	9.88	
Independent	Sakharam Mhaske	40,390	8.72	
Margin of victory		48,058	10.38	
Turnout		463,003	64.44	
INC gain from INC(I)		Swing		

=== General election 1980 ===
1980 Indian general election: Buldhana (SC)
Party	Candidate	Votes	%	±%
INC(I)	Balkrishna Wasnik	175,800	52.48	
INC(U)	Datta Hiwale	62,704	18.72	
Independent	Daulat Gunaji Gawai	61,527	18.37	
Margin of victory		113,096	33.76	
Turnout		335,001	51.92	
INC(I) gain from RPI(K)		Swing		

=== General election 1977 ===
1977 Indian general election: Buldhana (SC)
Party	Candidate	Votes	%	±%
RPI(K)	Daulat Gunaji Gawai	183,460	53.62	
RPI	Gopalrao Jadhav	140,605	41.09	
Independent	Bapu More	7,313	2.14	
Independent	Deorao Gawai	4,848	1.42	
Independent	Prabhakar Aware	4,205	1.23	
Margin of victory		42,855	12.53	
Turnout		342,151	60.77	
RPI(K) gain from INC		Swing		

=== General election 1971 ===
1971 Indian general election: Buldhana
Party	Candidate	Votes	%	±%
INC	Yadav Shivram Mahajan	206,180	66.91	
ABJS	Uttamrao Patil	92,457	30.01	
PWPI	Devram Chaudhari	4,965	1.61	
Independent	Ganpat Dhivre	4,525	1.47	
SWA	S. H. Awachar	7,246	2.19	
Margin of victory		113,723	36.90	
Turnout		308,127	64.94	
INC hold		Swing		

=== General election 1967 ===
1967 Indian general election: Buldhana
Party	Candidate	Votes	%	±%
INC	Shivram Rane	172,178	52.09	
ABJS	Kisanlal Sancheti	77,274	23.38	
RPI	S. H. Awachar	47,555	14.39	
PSP	K. M. Patil	26,257	7.94	
SWA	S. H. Awachar	7,246	2.19	
Margin of victory		94,904	28.71	
Turnout		330,510	72.48	
INC hold		Swing		

=== General election 1962 ===
1962 Indian general election: Buldhana
Party	Candidate	Votes	%	±%
INC	Shivram Rane	153,490	53.93	
PWPI	Sonu Ananda Pandit	71,311	25.05	
ABJS	Vithal Nathu Patil	59,835	21.02	
Margin of victory		82,179	28.88	
Turnout		284,636	70.32	
INC hold		Swing		

=== General election 1957 ===
1957 Indian general election: Buldhana
Party	Candidate	Votes	%	±%
INC	Shivram Rane	131,914	53.56	
ABJS	Keshavrao Bahekar	78,678	31.94	
PSP	Pandurang Jagdeorao	35,707	14.50	
Margin of victory		53,236	21.62	
Turnout		971,850	62.35	
INC hold		Swing		

=== General election 1951 ===
1951 Indian general election: Buldhana-Akola
Party	Candidate	Votes	%	±%
Margin of victory				
Turnout				
	gain from	Swing		

== See also ==
- Buldhana district
- Akola Lok Sabha constituency (1951 elections as Buldhana Akola Lok Sabha constituency electing two seats)
- Khamgaon Lok Sabha constituency (1962 - 1967 - 1971 elections )
- List of constituencies of the Lok Sabha
