= Rajendra Shingne =

Indian politician from Maharashtra (born 1960)

Cabinet Minister Government of Maharashtra
- In office 30 December 2019 – 29 June 2022
- Minister: Ministry of Food and Drug Administration
- Governor: Bhagat Singh Koshyari
- Deputy: Rajendra Patil Yadravkar
- Chief Minister: Uddhav Thackeray
- Deputy CM: Ajit Pawar
- Preceded by: Jayakumar Jitendrasinh Rawal
- Succeeded by: Eknath Shinde

Member of Maharashtra Legislative Assembly
- In office October 2019 – 26 November 2024
- Preceded by: Shashikant Narsingrao Khedekar
- Succeeded by: Manoj Kayande
- Constituency: Sindkhed Raja
- In office 1995–2014
- Preceded by: Kayande Totaram Tukaram
- Succeeded by: Shashikant Narsingrao Khedekar
- Constituency: Sindkhed Raja

Ministry of Health and Family Welfare in Government of Maharashtra
- In office December 2008 – October 2014
- Chief Minister: Ashok Chavan; Prithviraj Chavan
- Succeeded by: Eknath Shinde

Minister of State for Revenue in Government of Maharashtra
- In office November 2004 – December 2008
- Chief Minister: Vilasrao Deshmukh

Minister of State for Education in Government of Maharashtra
- In office October 1999 – November 2004
- Chief Minister: Vilasrao Deshmukh; Sushilkumar Shinde

Personal details
- Born: 30 March 1960 (age 66) Buldhana, Maharashtra, India
- Party: Nationalist Congress Party (Sharadchandra Pawar)
- Parent: Bhaskarrao Shingne
- Education: B.A.M.S. from Nagpur University
- Occupation: MLA
- Profession: Politician, Doctor

Rajendra Bhaskarrao Shingne is an Indian politician and a member of 9th, 10th, 11th, 12th and 14th Legislative Assembly of Maharashtra. He was Cabinet Minister for Food and Drugs administration in the Government of Maharashtra.

== Early life and education ==
Shingne was born 30 March 1960 in Buldhana of Maharashtra to his father Bhaskarrao Shingne. In 1988, he had completed HSC from Shivaji High School, Buldhana and he got BAMS degree in 1993, from Shri Gurudev Ayurvedic College, Mojhari, Amravati district (Rashtrasant Tukadoji Maharaj Nagpur University).

== Political career ==
Shingne is a prominent leader of the Nationalist Congress Party (NCP) from Vidarbha and is now the state vice-president of Nationalist Congress Party. Shingne served as a Member of Legislative Assembly from Sindkhed Raja Assembly constituency. He was elected to the Buldhana District Cooperative Credit Society in 1991. He started his journey in Maharashtra Assembly in 1995 when elected from Sindkhed Raja as an Independent candidate and joined Nationalist Congress Party in 1999 along with prominent leaders like Rajesh Tope Jayant Patil, Manohar Naik and R. R. Patil as well. Re-elected MLA in 1999 from Nationalist Congress Party, Shingne was a Minister of State for Education and in 2004 served as the Minister of State for Revenue. He was appointed cabinet minister for Health and Family Welfare in 2008 and 2009.

== Posts held ==
#	From	To	Position	Comments
01	March 1995	October 1999	Member, 9th Legislative Assembly of Maharashtra	1st term
02	October 1999	October 2004	Member, 10th Legislative Assembly of Maharashtra	2nd term
03	October 1999	October 2004	Minister of State for Education	Vilasrao Deshmukh Ministry
04	October 2004	October 2009	Member, 11th Legislative Assembly of Maharashtra	3rd terms
05	October 2004	October 2009	Minister of State for Revenue	Vilasrao Deshmukh Ministry
06	October 2009	October 2014	Member, 12th Legislative Assembly of Maharashtra	4th terms
07	October 2009	October 2014	Cabinet Minister of Health and Family Welfare	Ashok Chavan and Prithviraj Chavan Ministry
08	October 2019	November 2024	Member, 14th Legislative Assembly of Maharashtra	5th terms
09	October 2019	November 2024	Cabinet Minister of Food and Drug Administration	Uddhav Thackeray Ministry (2019 - 2022)
