= Deulgaon Raja =

- city
- Nickname: Pratitirupati
- Location in Maharashtra, India
- Coordinates: 20°01′N 76°17′E
- Country: India
- State: Maharashtra
- District: Buldhana

Government
  - Type: Municipal Council (Nagar Palika)
  - Body: Deulgaon Raja Municipal Council
  - President of Municipal Council: Madhuri Shimpane
  - Member of Legislative Assembly: Manoj Kayande (NCP)
  - Vice-President of Municipal Council: Vanita Bhutada
  - MP: Prataprao Jadhav (Shiv Sena)

Area
  - Total: 7.86 km^{2} (3.03 sq mi)

Population (2016)
  - Total: 67,827
  - Density: 8,630/km^{2} (22,400/sq mi)

Languages
  - Official: Marathi
- Time zone: UTC+5:30 (IST)
- Postal code: 443204
- Telephone code: 07261
- ISO 3166 code: IN-MH
- Vehicle registration: MH-28

Deulgaon Raja is a city and municipal council in the Buldhana district of Maharashtra, India. The city is located at the border of Vidarbha and Marathwada and is also called Pratitirupati by the people of Maharashtra.

== Demographics ==
As of 2011 India census, Deulgaon Raja had a population of 30,827. Males constitute 52% of the population and females 48%. Deulgaon Raja has an average literacy rate of 76%, higher than the national average of 59.5%: male literacy is 81.5% and, female literacy is 70%. In Deulgaon Raja, 13% of the population is under 6 years of ages. Deulgaon Raja is known for the temple of Balaji.

| Year | Male | Female | Total Population | Change | Religion (%) | | | | | | | |
| Year | Male | Female | Total Population | Change | Hindu | Muslim | Christian | Sikhs | Buddhist | Jain | Other religions and persuasions | Religion not stated |
|---|---|---|---|---|---|---|---|---|---|---|---|---|
| 2001 | 12633 | 11739 | 24372 | - | 67.742 | 23.531 | 0.213 | 0.025 | 4.965 | 3.340 | 0.185 | 0.000 |
| 2011 | 15954 | 14873 | 30827 | 0.265 | 64.713 | 25.478 | 0.308 | 0.182 | 6.008 | 3.247 | 0.000 | 0.065 |

== History ==
Balaji temple is among the popular religious places of Maharastra and more important is that it is in Deulgaon Raja. Balaji temple has its own festival of "Lalit", celebrated by all Deulgaon Rajakars. The big woods approximately of 30 feet 21 wooden trunks are arranged in line and have diameter of 1 foot. These trunks are worshiped by all devotees. That trunks are usually called as 'laata'. The Sansthan handles the whole work and arrangement of mandir. It is called that the statue is found to Raje Jadhao. He proposed and created the temple. The area around the mandir is known as Balaji faras. The biggest festival of this town is Vijayadashami and which is celebrated a day before main Vijayadashami celebrated among whole India. The god balaji's statue is kept in palakhi during the time of Vijayadashami. It is an auspicious day for all the devotees. Many devotees come a day before the ritual of falling of laata. Its the ritual which occurs in very early morning.when laata falls down from that day second festival starts Like Diwali. For Diwali in Deulgaon raja all Deulgaonkers arrange Yatraa for all tourist who come from out of India, Out of Maharashtra, Out of Buldhana. We welcome all of the with love. The yatra goes till one month.
