= Mukul Wasnik =

Indian politician

Mukul B. Wasnik
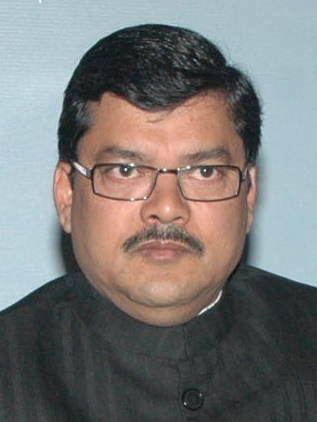
- Wasnik in January 2010

AICC General Secretary for Gujarat
- Incumbent
- Assumed office 24 December 2023
- Appointed by: Mallikarjun Kharge
- Preceded by: Raghu Sharma

Member of Parliament, Rajya Sabha
- Incumbent
- Assumed office 5 July 2022
- Preceded by: Ram Kumar Verma
- Constituency: Rajasthan

Union Minister of Social Justice and Empowerment
- In office 28 May 2009 – 27 October 2012
- Prime Minister: Manmohan Singh
- Preceded by: Meira Kumar
- Succeeded by: Selja Kumari

Union Minister of State for Parliamentary Affairs
- In office 19 January 1993 – 16 May 1996
- Prime Minister: P. V. Narasimha Rao
- Minister: Vidya Charan Shukla; Ghulam Nabi Azad

Union Minister of State for Human Resource Development (Youth Affairs and Sports)
- In office 18 January 1993 – 16 May 1996
- Prime Minister: P. V. Narasimha Rao
- Minister: Arjun Singh; P. V. Narasimha Rao; Madhavrao Scindia; P. V. Narasimha Rao

Member of Parliament, Lok Sabha
- In office 16 May 2009 – 16 May 2014
- Preceded by: Prakash Jadhav
- Succeeded by: Krupal Tumane
- Constituency: Ramtek
- In office 3 March 1998 – 26 April 1999
- Preceded by: Anandrao Vithoba Adsul
- Succeeded by: Anandrao Vithoba Adsul
- Constituency: Buldhana
- In office 20 June 1991 – 13 May 1996
- Preceded by: Sukhdev Nanaji Kale
- Succeeded by: Anandrao Vithoba Adsul
- Constituency: Buldhana
- In office 31 December 1984 – 2 December 1989
- Preceded by: Balkrishna Ramchandra Wasnik
- Succeeded by: Sukhdev Nanaji Kale
- Constituency: Buldhana

President of the Indian Youth Congress
- In office 1988–1990
- Preceded by: Gurudas Kamat
- Succeeded by: Ramesh Chennithala

National President of the National Students Union of India
- In office 1984–1986
- Preceded by: Ramesh Chennithala
- Succeeded by: Manish Tewari

Personal details
- Born: 27 September 1959 (age 67) New Delhi, India
- Party: Indian National Congress
- Spouse: Ravina Wasnik
- Parent: Balkrishna Ramchandra Wasnik (father)
- Education: BSc, MBA
- Alma mater: University of Nagpur

Mukul Balkrishna Wasnik (born 27 September 1959) is an Indian Politician and a Member of Parliament. He was the Minister for Social Justice and Empowerment in Government of India. He represented the Ramtek Lok Sabha constituency of Maharashtra from 2009 to 2014. He is a member of the Indian National Congress (INC) political party. He is also a General Secretary of the All India Congress Committee. In 2022, Wasnik was elected member of the Rajya Sabha.

== Personal life ==
Wasnik was born in a Buddhist family to Veteran Congress leader and three time MP, Balkrishna Ramchandra Wasnik.

In March 2020, Mukul Wasnik married his friend Raveena Khurana at the age of 60. In 2008, Wasnik suffered a brain haemorrhage.

== Political career ==
Earlier Wasnik represented Buldhana Lok Sabha constituency of Maharashtra during 8th,10th,12th from 1984 - 1999. In 1984, Wasnik became the youngest Member of Parliament aged 25. He has tended to win and lose alternately. From Buldhana - winning in 1984 and losing the next in 1989, winning in 1991 and losing the next in 1996, winning in 1998 and losing in 1999. Then winning from Ramtek in 2009 and losing the next one from there in 2014.

Wasnik was elected as the National President of National Students' Union of India during 1984–1986.

Later Wasnik was elected as President of Indian Youth Congress during 1988–1990.

In June 2022, Wasnik was elected to the Rajya Sabha from Rajasthan on Indian National Congress nomination.

Political offices
| Preceded by Meira Kumar | Minister of Social Justice and Empowerment; 2009-2012 | Succeeded by Selja Kumari |
