= Mehkar Assembly constituency =

Constituency of the Maharashtra legislative assembly 0n India

Coordinates: 20.15°N 76.58°E

Mehkar
- Constituency No. 25 for the Maharashtra Legislative Assembly

Constituency details
- Country: India
- Region: Western India
- State: Maharashtra
- District: Buldhana
- Lok Sabha constituency: Buldhana
- Established: 1952
- Total electors: 306,583
- Reservation: SC

Member of Legislative Assembly
- 15th Maharashtra Legislative Assembly
- Incumbent Siddharth Kharat
- Party: SS(UBT)
- Alliance: MVA
- Elected year: 2024

Mehkar Assembly constituency is one of the 288 constituencies of Maharashtra Vidhan Sabha and one of the seven which are located in the Buldhana district. It is reserved for Scheduled Caste candidates.

== Overview ==
It is a part of Buldhana Lok Sabha constituency along with five other Vidhan Sabha (assembly) constituencies, viz. Buldhana, Chikhali, Sindkhed Raja, Khamgaon and Jalgaon (Jamod).

The seventh Malkapur Assembly constituency from Buldhana district is a part of Raver Lok Sabha constituency from neighbouring Jalgaon district.

This city based on the bank of the Painganga. Painganga source through Satmala Agintha Dongar.

As per orders of Delimitation of Parliamentary and Assembly constituencies Order, 2008, No. 25 Mehkar Assembly constituency is composed of the following: 1. Mehkar Tehsil, 2. Lonar Tehsil (Part), Revenue Circle Sultanpur, Titavi and Lonar, Lonar (MC) of Buldhana district.

== Members of the Legislative Assembly ==
Year	Member	Party
1952	Anandrao Marotrao Pawar	Indian National Congress
1952	Kakal Tulsiram Rodu (Sc)	Scheduled Castes Federation
1957	Annasaheb Alias Shankarrao Vithalrao	Peasants and Workers Party of India
1957	Laxman Thakuji Gawai	Sarvodaya Karnataka Paksha
1962	Annasaheb Deshmukh Alias Shankarrao	Indian National Congress
1967	Sitaram Chinkaji Lodhe	Indian National Congress
1972	Sitaram Chinkaji Lodhe	Indian National Congress
1978	Subodh Keshao Saoji	Indian National Congress
1980	Kisanrao Tukaram Sangle	Indian National Congress
1985	Subodh Keshao Saoji	Independent politician
1990	Subodh Keshao Saoji	Indian National Congress
1995	Prataprao Jadhav	Shiv Sena
1999	Prataprao Jadhav	Shiv Sena
2004	Prataprao Jadhav	Shiv Sena
2009	Sanjay Raimulkar	Shiv Sena
2014	Sanjay Raimulkar	Shiv Sena
2019	Sanjay Raimulkar	Shiv Sena
2024	Siddharth Kharat	Shiv Sena (UBT)

== Election results ==
=== Assembly Election 2024 ===
2024 Maharashtra Legislative Assembly election : Mehkar
Party	Candidate	Votes	%	±%
SS(UBT)	Siddharth Kharat	104,242	48.79	New
SS	Sanjay Bhaskar Raimulkar	99,423	46.53	▼18.39
VBA	Dr. Rutuja Rushank Chavan	2,054	0.96	▼3.70
Independent	Prof. Bhaskar Govinda Ingle	1,330	0.62	New
NOTA	None of the Above	467	0.22	▼1.08
Margin of victory		4,819	2.26	▼33.79
Turnout		214,128	69.84	▲10.90
Total valid votes		213,661		
Registered electors		306,583		▲4.44
SS(UBT) gain from SS		Swing	▼16.13	

=== Assembly Election 2019 ===
2019 Maharashtra Legislative Assembly election : Mehkar
Party	Candidate	Votes	%	±%
SS	Dr. Sanjay Bhaskar Raymulkar	112,038	64.92	▲16.61
INC	Adv.Anant Sakharam Wankhede	49,836	28.88	▲2.17
VBA	Aabarao Shriram Wagh	8,050	4.66	New
NOTA	None of the Above	2,241	1.30	▲0.31
BSP	Anil Devrao Khadse	1,411	0.82	▲0.04
Independent	Manwatkar Laxman Krishnaji	1,240	0.72	New
Margin of victory		62,202	36.04	▲14.44
Turnout		174,918	59.59	▼0.58
Total valid votes		172,575		
Registered electors		293,549		▲4.77
SS hold		Swing	▲16.61	

=== Assembly Election 2014 ===
2014 Maharashtra Legislative Assembly election : Mehkar
Party	Candidate	Votes	%	±%
SS	Dr. Sanjay Bhaskar Raymulkar	80,356	48.31	▼9.66
INC	Laxmanrao Januji Ghumare	44,421	26.71	New
BJP	Gawai Narhari Onkar	17,035	10.24	New
NCP	Ashwini Shivcharan Akhade	12,759	7.67	▼29.33
BBM	Prakash Chindhaji Gawai	4,267	2.57	New
NOTA	None of the Above	1,646	0.99	New
BSP	Khandare Sahebrao Rambhau	1,290	0.78	▼0.33
Margin of victory		35,935	21.60	▲0.63
Turnout		168,034	59.98	▼4.25
Total valid votes		166,330		
Registered electors		280,172		▲12.95
SS hold		Swing	▼9.66	

=== Assembly Election 2009 ===
2009 Maharashtra Legislative Assembly election : Mehkar
Party	Candidate	Votes	%	±%
SS	Dr. Sanjay Bhaskar Raymulkar	91,475	57.97	▲3.95
NCP	Adv. Sahebrao Ashruji Sardar	58,380	37.00	▲20.16
Independent	Bharat Punjaji Shingane	2,622	1.66	New
PWPI	Pradip Eknath Ambhore	2,534	1.61	New
BSP	Randhir Sadashiv Kharat	1,745	1.11	▼0.95
Independent	Dewanand Sahebrao Chavan	1,042	0.66	New
Margin of victory		33,095	20.97	▼9.19
Turnout		157,814	63.62	▼10.70
Total valid votes		157,798		
Registered electors		248,049		▲24.06
SS hold		Swing	▲3.95	

=== Assembly Election 2004 ===
2004 Maharashtra Legislative Assembly election : Mehkar
Party	Candidate	Votes	%	±%
SS	Prataprao Jadhav	80,277	54.02	▲5.17
Independent	Bhagwat Mhataraji Magar	35,456	23.86	New
NCP	Subodh Keshao Saoji	25,017	16.83	▲13.41
BSP	Shankar Shriram Darade	3,051	2.05	New
BBM	Gawai Madhukar Pralhad	2,269	1.53	New
Independent	Davhale Ashwinkumar Laxmanrao	934	0.63	New
Margin of victory		44,821	30.16	▲0.11
Turnout		148,673	74.36	▲3.19
Total valid votes		148,602		
Registered electors		199,950		▲23.75
SS hold		Swing	▲5.17	

=== Assembly Election 1999 ===
1999 Maharashtra Legislative Assembly election : Mehkar
Party	Candidate	Votes	%	±%
SS	Prataprao Jadhav	56,138	48.85	▼6.00
Independent	Subodh Keshao Saoji	21,607	18.80	New
INC	Umalkar Shyam Motiram	21,413	18.63	▼11.13
Independent	Mapari Kishor Gulabrao	11,826	10.29	New
NCP	Kale Bhaskarrao Punjaji	3,939	3.43	New
Margin of victory		34,531	30.05	▲4.96
Turnout		121,564	75.24	▼9.05
Total valid votes		114,923		
Registered electors		161,575		▼2.32
SS hold		Swing	▼6.00	

=== Assembly Election 1995 ===
1995 Maharashtra Legislative Assembly election : Mehkar
Party	Candidate	Votes	%	±%
SS	Prataprao Jadhav	72,744	54.85	▲14.45
INC	Subodh Keshao Saoji	39,472	29.76	▼19.34
BBM	Bhaskarrao Kisanrao Sangle	14,273	10.76	New
Independent	Akhade Keshaorao Vithoba	1,733	1.31	New
JD	Bore Keshaorao Anandrao	1,091	0.82	▲0.42
Margin of victory		33,272	25.09	▲16.39
Turnout		135,153	81.71	▲7.22
Total valid votes		132,622		
Registered electors		165,409		▲9.29
SS gain from INC		Swing	▲5.75	

=== Assembly Election 1990 ===
1990 Maharashtra Legislative Assembly election : Mehkar
Party	Candidate	Votes	%	±%
INC	Subodh Keshao Saoji	54,219	49.10	▲33.10
SS	Prataprao Jadhav	44,609	40.40	New
Independent	Abdul Hadikha A. Hamikha	5,983	5.42	New
Independent	Gaikwad Dattaraya Gopal	3,104	2.81	New
Margin of victory		9,610	8.70	▲4.43
Turnout		112,265	74.18	▲3.16
Total valid votes		110,424		
Registered electors		151,345		▲24.08
INC gain from Independent		Swing	▲11.73	

=== Assembly Election 1985 ===
1985 Maharashtra Legislative Assembly election : Mehkar
Party	Candidate	Votes	%	±%
Independent	Subodh Keshao Saoji	31,817	37.37	New
IC(S)	Rahate Ruprao Ayaji	28,177	33.10	New
INC	Sangle Kisanrao Tukaram	13,625	16.00	New
Independent	More Digambar Shankar	6,185	7.26	New
Independent	Chavan Haribhau Bakshu	3,499	4.11	New
Margin of victory		3,640	4.28	▼20.27
Turnout		86,966	71.30	▲8.02
Total valid votes		85,137		
Registered electors		121,970		▲14.92
Independent gain from INC(I)		Swing	▼21.31	

=== Assembly Election 1980 ===
1980 Maharashtra Legislative Assembly election : Mehkar
Party	Candidate	Votes	%	±%
INC(I)	Sangle Kisanrao Tukaram	38,481	58.68	▲5.65
INC(U)	Kale Ashru Baliram	22,388	34.14	New
BJP	Namdeo Daulat Shewale	4,704	7.17	New
Margin of victory		16,093	24.54	▼5.68
Turnout		67,354	63.46	▼13.12
Total valid votes		65,573		
Registered electors		106,132		▲7.66
INC(I) hold		Swing	▲5.65	

=== Assembly Election 1978 ===
1978 Maharashtra Legislative Assembly election : Mehkar
Party	Candidate	Votes	%	±%
INC(I)	Saoji Subodh Kesh Keshaosa	39,163	53.04	New
Independent	Bajad Anant Tulshiram	16,848	22.82	New
INC	Lodhe Sitaram Ghinkaji	16,280	22.05	▼27.19
RPI(K)	Sawale Rajabhau Dhanaji	1,020	1.38	New
PWPI	Jadhao Ramkrishanrao Abahi	528	0.72	New
Margin of victory		22,315	30.22	▲24.52
Turnout		76,214	77.31	▲8.23
Total valid votes		73,839		
Registered electors		98,580		▲7.79
INC(I) gain from INC		Swing	▲3.80	

=== Assembly Election 1972 ===
1972 Maharashtra Legislative Assembly election : Mehkar
Party	Candidate	Votes	%	±%
INC	Sitaram Chinkaji Lodhe	30,022	49.24	▲7.47
Independent	Tale Yadaorao Vithoba	26,548	43.54	New
RPI	Kisan Govinda Kakde	3,288	5.39	▼27.54
Independent	Januji Gyanuji Ghumre	1,116	1.83	New
Margin of victory		3,474	5.70	▼3.14
Turnout		63,343	69.26	▼7.86
Total valid votes		60,974		
Registered electors		91,456		▲12.85
INC hold		Swing	▲7.47	

=== Assembly Election 1967 ===
1967 Maharashtra Legislative Assembly election : Mehkar
Party	Candidate	Votes	%	±%
INC	Sitaram Chinkaji Lodhe	25,232	41.77	▼9.92
RPI	G. V. Tale	19,895	32.93	New
ABJS	B. H. Dalimkar	12,753	21.11	New
Independent	P. G. Athavale	2,527	4.18	New
Margin of victory		5,337	8.84	▼5.41
Turnout		65,025	80.23	▲3.88
Total valid votes		60,407		
Registered electors		81,045		▲14.04
INC hold		Swing	▼9.92	

=== Assembly Election 1962 ===
1962 Maharashtra Legislative Assembly election : Mehkar
Party	Candidate	Votes	%	±%
INC	Annasaheb Deshmukh Alias Shankarrao	25,957	51.69	▲35.88
Independent	Kisan Tukaram Sangle	18,803	37.44	New
PWPI	Ramkrishna Abaji Jadhao	5,456	10.87	▼14.04
Margin of victory		7,154	14.25	▲5.90
Turnout		54,129	76.17	▼41.50
Total valid votes		50,216		
Registered electors		71,067		▼40.36
INC gain from PWPI		Swing	▲26.79	

=== Assembly Election 1957 ===
1957 Bombay State Legislative Assembly election : Mehkar
Party	Candidate	Votes	%	±%
PWPI	Annasaheb Alias Shankarrao Vithalrao	33,285	24.90	New
SCF	Kakal Tulsiram Rodu (Sc)	22,132	16.56	▲6.81
INC	Ingle Ramchandra Thamkaji (Sc)	21,136	15.81	▼5.32
INC	Pawar Anandrao Marotirao	16,454	12.31	▼8.82
Independent	Kale Punjaji Ayaji	16,338	12.22	New
ABJS	Mhaski Shamrao Balaji	7,305	5.47	New
Independent	Borade Baliram Dewaj (Sc)	6,171	4.62	New
Margin of victory		11,153	8.34	▲8.01
Turnout		133,659	112.16	▲14.29
Total valid votes		133,659		
Registered electors		119,166		▲24.93
PWPI gain from INC		Swing	▲3.77	

=== Assembly Election 1952 ===
1952 Madhya Pradesh Legislative Assembly election : Mehkar
Party	Candidate	Votes	%	±%
INC	Anandrao Marotrao Pawar	19,729	21.13	New
SKP	Laxman Thakuji Gawai	19,415	20.80	New
SKP	Shankarrao Vithalrao Deshmukh	18,518	19.84	New
INC	Tukaram Narayan Sable	15,198	16.28	New
SCF	Baliram Dowaji Borde	9,097	9.74	New
Independent	Tulsiram Hedu	4,593	4.92	New
Independent	Nivritti Anandrao	3,777	4.05	New
Margin of victory		314	0.34	
Turnout		93,352	97.87	
Total valid votes		93,352		
Registered electors		95,385		
INC win (new seat)				
