= Mehkar =

- Town
- Location in Maharashtra, India Mehkar (India)
- Coordinates: 20°09′N 76°34′E
- Country: India
- State: Maharashtra
- District: Buldhana
- Taluka: Mehkar Taluka

Government
  - Type: Municipal Council
  - Body: Mehkar Municipal Council
  - President (Nagaradhyaksha): Kishor Bhaskar Garole

Area
  - Total: 12.5 km^{2} (4.8 sq mi)
- Elevation: 288 m (945 ft)

Population (2011)
  - Total: 45,248
  - Density: 3,620/km^{2} (9,380/sq mi)

Languages
  - Official: Marathi
- Time zone: UTC+5:30 (IST)
- PIN: 443301
- Telephone code: 07268
- Vehicle registration: MH-28
- Sex ratio: 944 ♀/1000 ♂
- Literacy: 86.43%
- River: Painganga River

Mehkar is a town and tehsil in the Buldhana district of the state of India. It is governed by the Mehkar Municipal Council and is situated in the Vidarbha region. The town lies near the Painganga River. The local economy is primarily based on agriculture and small-scale industries.

== History ==
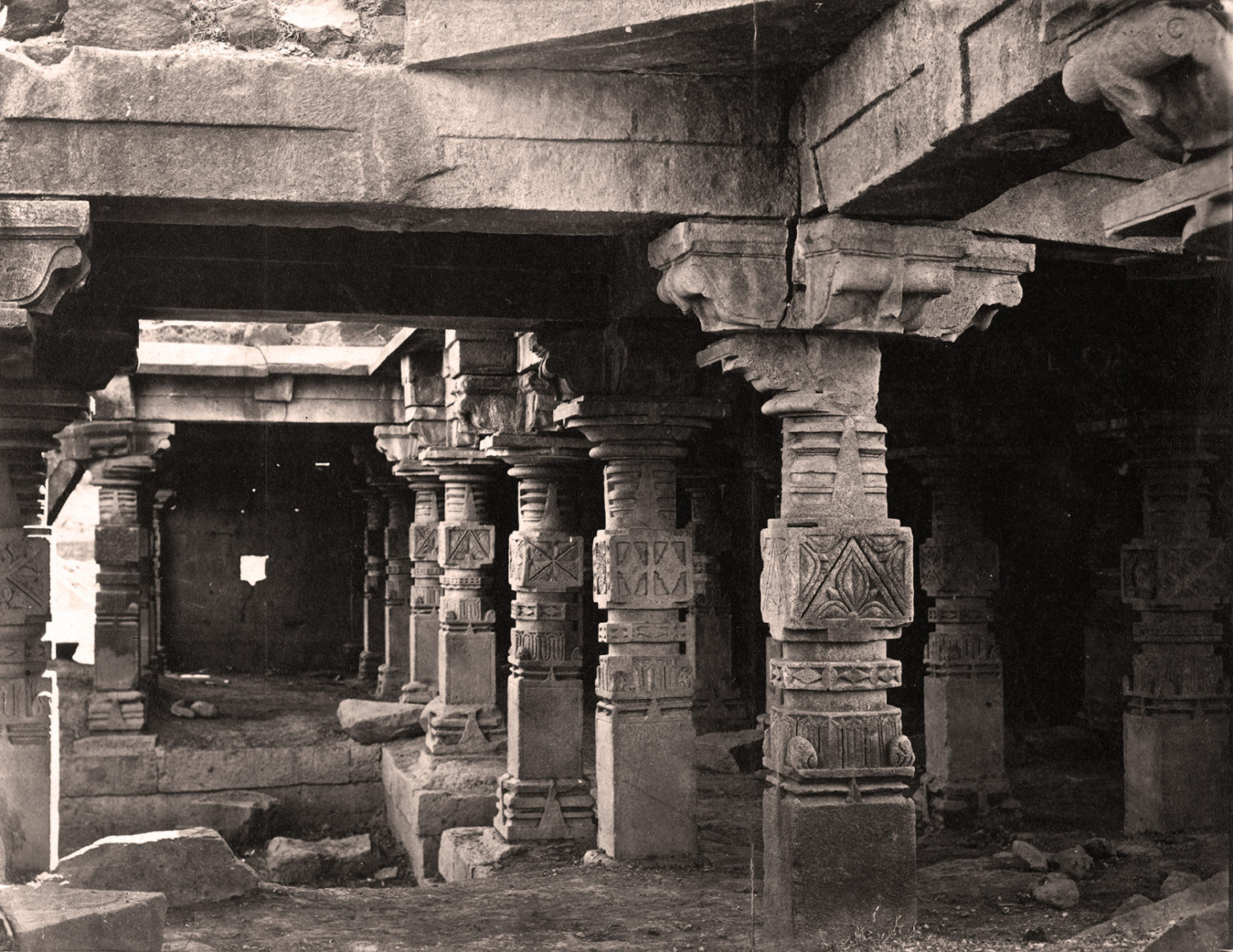
Remains of Dharmashala

=== Mythological origins ===
Mehkar has significant mythological associations. According to local tradition, the town derives its name from a demon called Meghankara, who is said to have terrorised the region. The demon was slain by Vishnu in his incarnation as Sharangadhara, and the place came to be known by a corrupted form of his name, eventually becoming Mehkar.

=== Early historical references ===
Mehkar finds mention in the Ain-i-Akbari as the headquarters of a sarkar (administrative division) during the Mughal period. Some traditional accounts also suggest that the town existed several centuries before the Hijri era, indicating its antiquity.

=== Medieval period ===
During the medieval period, Mehkar developed as a fortified settlement. A prosperous community of weavers and Momins is believed to have fortified the town around the 15th century. An inscription on one of the gates records the construction date as 1488 CE, indicating organised urban development and economic prosperity during this time. The town was once a thriving centre of weaving, particularly known for the production of fine dhotis.

=== Maratha and British period ===
In 1769, Madhavrao Peshwa camped at Mehkar along with Rukn-ud-Daula, the minister of the Nizam, during a campaign against Janoji Bhonsle. Later, in 1817, General Doveton camped at Mehkar during British military operations against Appa Saheb Bhonsle.

=== Architectural and archaeological remains ===
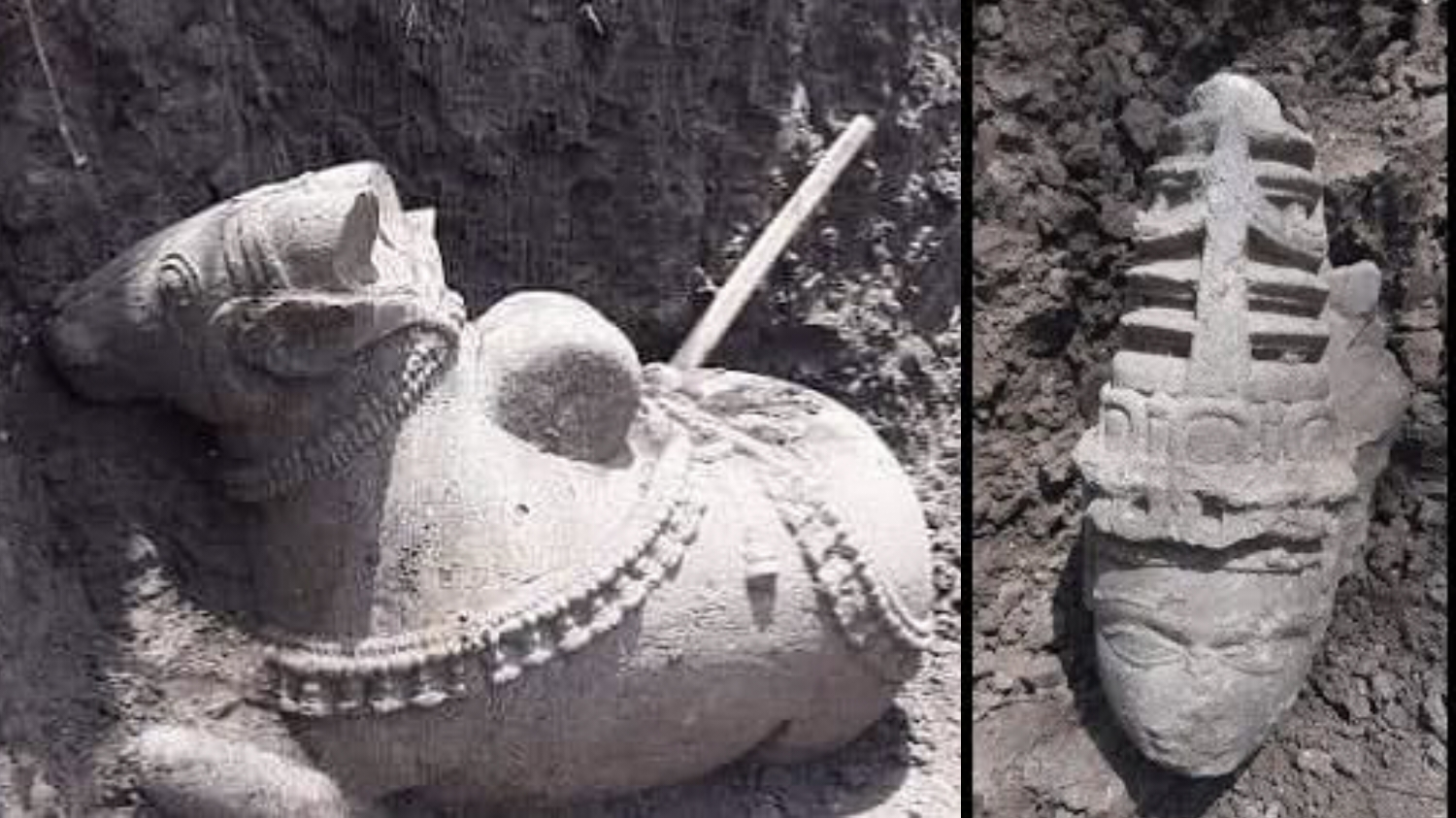
Remains of Hemadpanthi temple in Mehkar

Archaeological remains in and around Mehkar indicate the presence of medieval structures. Traces of a Hemadpanti temple survive mainly in the form of retaining walls. Nearby is a partially ruined dharmashala, characterised by a colonnaded structure with geometric and floral designs, suggesting construction during a later medieval phase. Other notable historical sites include the Punch Pir shrine located on elevated ground to the east of the town, and the remains of a structure locally known as Kanchani-cha Mahal situated to the northeast.

=== Modern development ===
Historically, Mehkar served as an important administrative centre and at one time gave its name to a district. It functioned as a district headquarters before administrative reorganisation shifted this status to Buldhana. The municipality of Mehkar was established in 1929, marking the beginning of organised local self-governance. As the headquarters of Mehkar taluka, the town houses various administrative offices including those of the Tahsildar, Civil Judge, Judicial Magistrate, police station and panchayat samiti.

== Geography ==
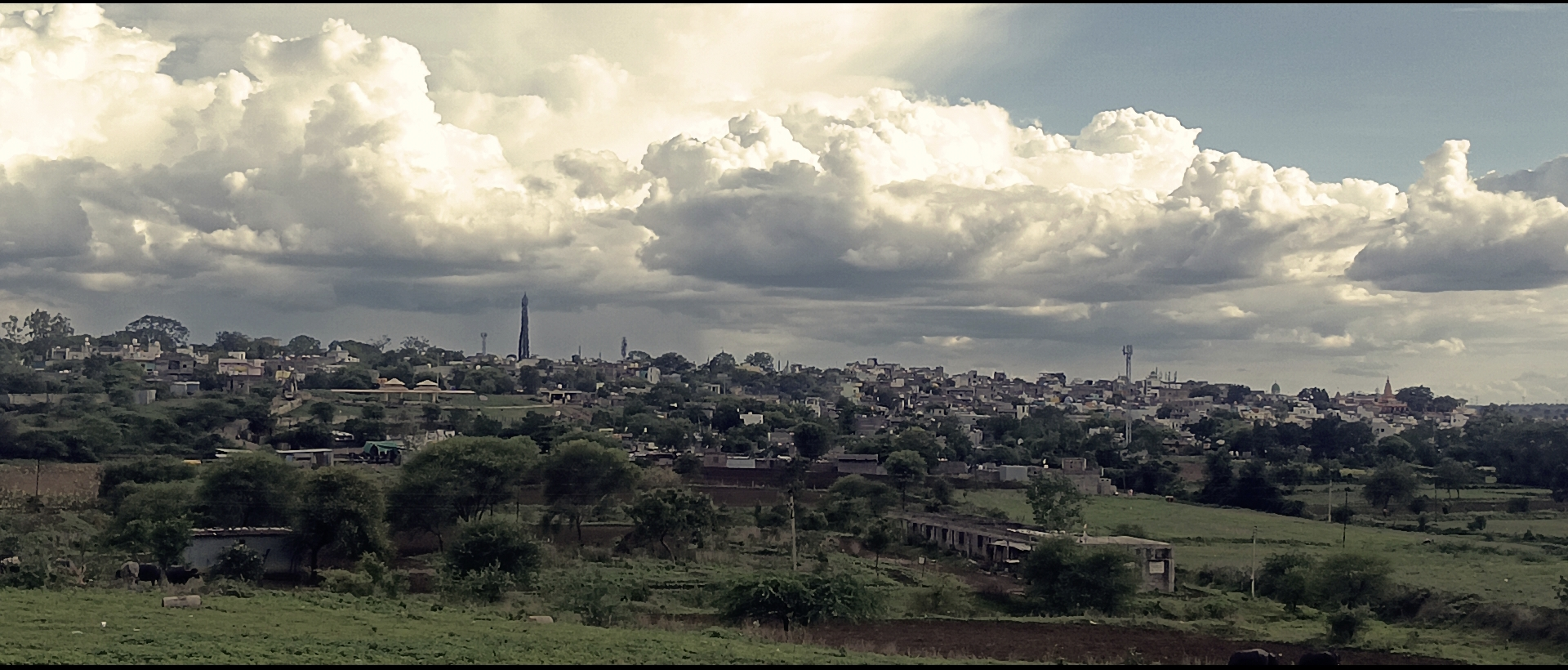
Mehkar Town View from Janephal Road

Mehkar is located in the Buldhana district of Maharashtra and lies in the Vidarbha region. It is situated on the Buldhana (Balaghat) plateau, part of the Ajanta ranges. The region is characterised by an undulating plateau with valleys, ridges and seasonal streams. The elevation ranges from 500 to 800 metres above sea level and the general slope of the land is from north to south. The plateau edge is marked by deep ravines and dissected terrain formed due to erosion.

=== Physiography ===
Buldhana district is divided into:

- Satpuda hills (north)
- Purna plains (middle)
- Buldhana plateau (south)

Mehkar lies on the Balaghat plateau, a volcanic basaltic region with rugged topography.

Land features in Mehkar region
1. Plateau (50.0%)
2. Valleys (30.0%)
3. Ravines & slopes (20.0%)

=== Rivers ===
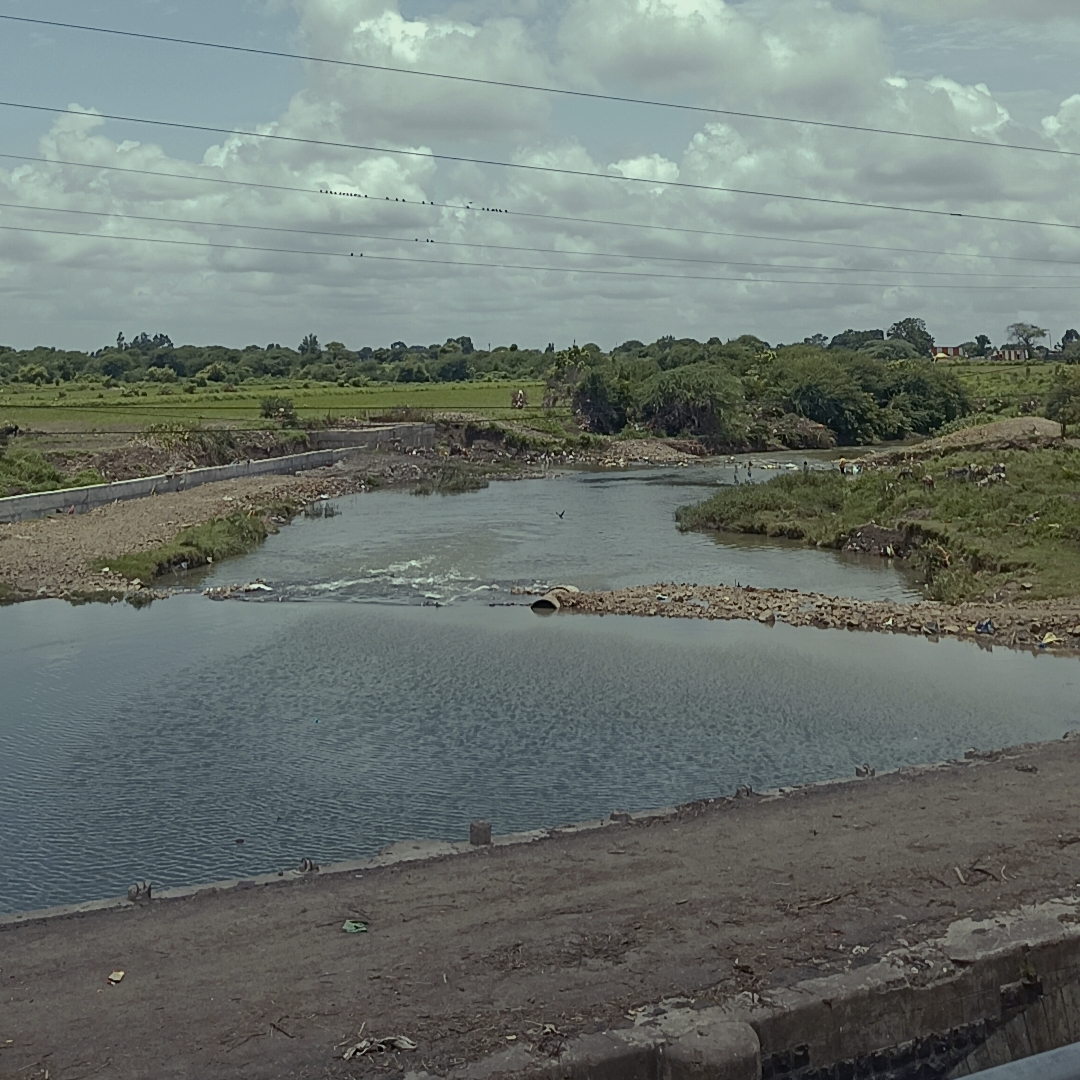
Painaganga River Old Bridge

The Penganga River is the main river, flowing southeast and draining Mehkar region. It is mostly seasonal. Other rivers:

- Katepurna River
- Koradi River

All rivers belong to the Godavari basin.

River	Type	Notes
Penganga	Seasonal	Main river of Mehkar region
Katepurna	Seasonal	Tributary of Godavari
Koradi	Tributary	Joins Penganga

=== Soils ===
Soils are derived from volcanic rocks (Deccan Traps). Major types include:

- Bhurkati – deep black, moisture-retentive soil
- Morand – black cotton soil
- Barad – shallow upland soil

These soils support crops like cotton, jowar, pulses and wheat.

Soil type	Description	Fertility
Bhurkati	Deep black, moisture-retentive soil	High
Morand	Black cotton soil	Moderate to high
Barad	Shallow upland soil	Low

=== Climate ===
The climate is hot and dry, with rainfall during the southwest monsoon (June–September). Summers are hot and winters are mild.

Season	Months	Characteristics
Summer	March–May	Very hot and dry
Monsoon	June–September	Heavy rainfall
Winter	October–February	Mild and cool

=== Agriculture ===
Agriculture is the main occupation. Major crops:

- Cotton
- Jowar
- Wheat
- Pulses

Irrigation depends mainly on borewells and seasonal water.

=== Natural Features ===
The region has plateau ridges, valleys and ravines. Groundwater is available in valleys but uplands face scarcity. Mehkar lies in the Deccan Trap region with basaltic geological formations.

Feature	Details
Region	Vidarbha (Maharashtra)
Plateau	Buldhana / Balaghat Plateau
Elevation	500–800 m
Slope	North to South
Terrain	Plateau with ravines & valleys
Rivers	Penganga, Katepurna, Koradi
Soil	Bhurkati, Morand, Barad
Origin	Volcanic (Deccan Traps)
Climate	Hot, dry, monsoon rainfall
Agriculture	Cotton, jowar, wheat, pulses

== Administration ==
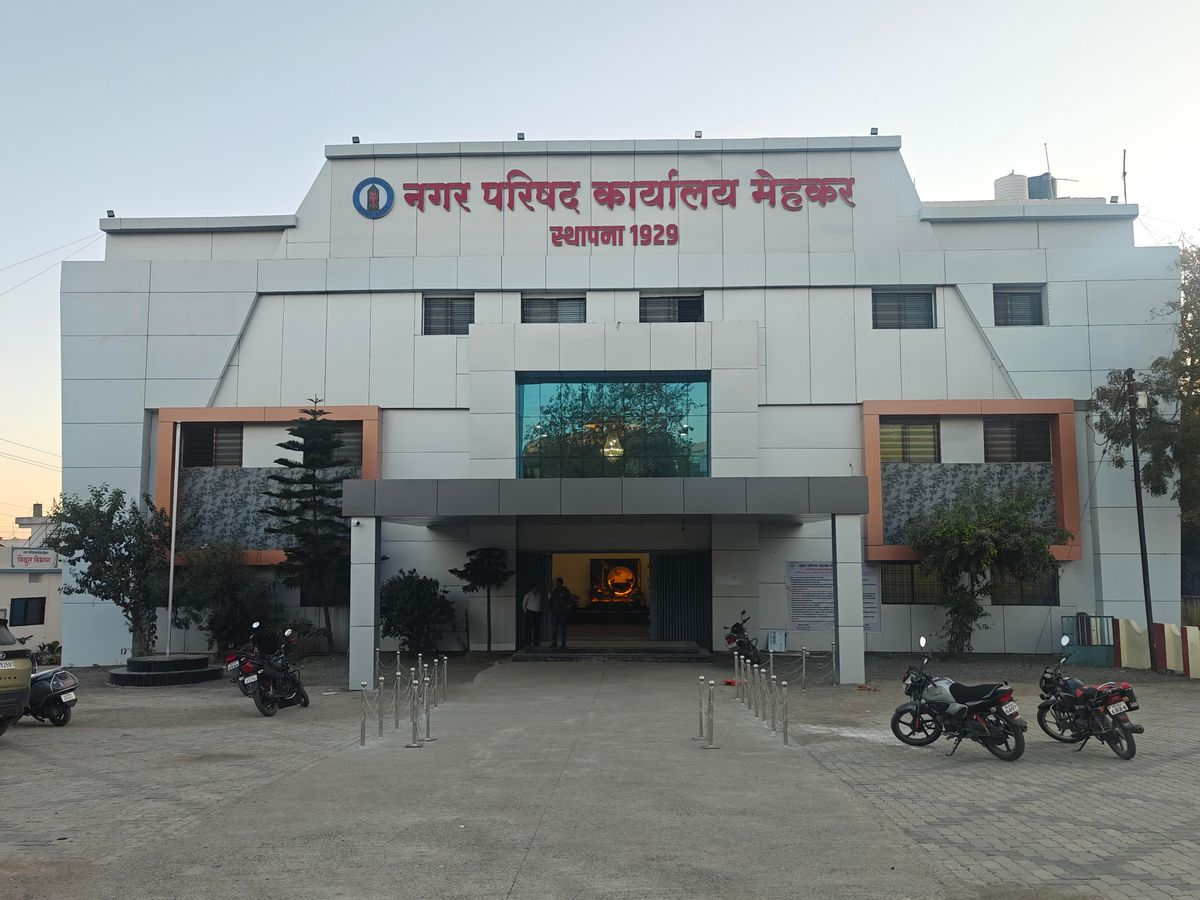
Mehkar Municipal Council Building

Mehkar is governed by the Mehkar Municipal Council (Nagar Parishad), which is responsible for civic administration and provision of basic services.

=== Municipal Council ===
In the 2025 municipal elections, Kishor Bhaskar Garole of Shiv Sena (Uddhav Balasaheb Thackeray) was elected as the President (Nagaradhyaksha) of Mehkar Municipal Council.

=== Ward Members (2025) ===
Ward No.	Seat	Councillor	Party
1	A	Satish Gopal Tajne	Shiv Sena (Uddhav Balasaheb Thackeray)
1	B	Rupali Kishor Garole	Shiv Sena (Uddhav Balasaheb Thackeray)
2	A	Dr. Deepika Raviraj Rahate	Shiv Sena
2	B	Mahesh Sheshrao Rindhe	Shiv Sena (Uddhav Balasaheb Thackeray)
3	A	Mangala Suresh Manvatkar	Indian National Congress
3	B	Hasan Ahabib Mujib	Indian National Congress
4	A	Jamanbai Peeru Gavali	Indian National Congress
4	B	Kha Valimohammad Mujib	Indian National Congress
5	A	Anjum Bano Shaikh Akhtar Qureshi	Indian National Congress
5	B	Mahebub Shaikh Jummagavali Shaikh	Indian National Congress
6	A	Narmada Suresh Gaikwad	Shiv Sena
6	B	Omprakash Pandurang Saubhagye	Shiv Sena
7	A	Shabnura Bi Shaikh Rais Qureshi	Indian National Congress
7	B	Aleem Taher Mohammad	Indian National Congress
8	A	Nitin Ramesh Tupe	Shiv Sena (Uddhav Balasaheb Thackeray)
8	B	Sarala Mohan Jadhav	Shiv Sena
9	A	Sunita Sanjay Dhakarkar	Indian National Congress
9	B	Vaibhav Girish Umalkar	Indian National Congress
10	A	Akka Badrinath Gaikwad	Shiv Sena
10	B	Kavita Vishal Kabra	Shiv Sena
11	A	Vilas Vaijnath Chankhore	Shiv Sena (Uddhav Balasaheb Thackeray)
11	B	Aafiya Tabassum Nisar Ahmed Ansari	Shiv Sena (Uddhav Balasaheb Thackeray)
12	A	Suresh Vishwanath Walukar	Shiv Sena
12	B	Priti Pravin Shingnath	Shiv Sena
13	A	Rupali Manoj Jadhav	Shiv Sena
13	B	Nilima Sharad Soman	Indian National Congress

=== Taluka Administration ===
Mehkar serves as the administrative headquarters of Mehkar taluka. The revenue administration is headed by the Tehsildar. As of recent records, the Tehsildar of Mehkar is Nilesh Madke.

=== Legislative Representation ===
Mehkar is part of the Mehkar Assembly constituency of the Maharashtra Legislative Assembly, which is reserved for Scheduled Castes. The constituency is currently represented by Siddharth Kharat. At the national level, Mehkar falls under the Buldhana Lok Sabha constituency, represented by Prataprao Jadhav in the Lok Sabha.

== Demographics ==
According to the 2011 Census of India, Mehkar had a population of 45,248, comprising 23,274 males and 21,974 females. Children aged 0–6 years numbered 5,935, accounting for 13.12% of the total population. The average literacy rate of the town was 86.43%, higher than the state average of Maharashtra. Male literacy stood at 92.59%, while female literacy was 79.98%.

The sex ratio of Mehkar was 944 females per 1,000 males, while the child sex ratio (0–6 years) was 882.

The religious composition of the town, as per the 2011 census, is shown below:

Religion in Mehkar (2011 Census)
1. Hindu (56.5%)
2. Muslim (31.2%)
3. Buddhist (11.4%)
4. Jain (0.55%)
5. Christian (0.18%)
6. Sikh (0.07%)
7. Others (0.02%)
8. Not stated (0.09%)

Population distribution in Mehkar (2011)
Gender	Population
Male	23,274
Female	21,974

Age distribution in Mehkar (2011)
1. Age 0–6 (13.1%)
2. Above 6 (86.9%)

== Places To Visit ==
=== Harin Tekdi ===
Harin Tekdi is a hill in Mehkar associated with local folklore. It is believed that Lord Rama stayed here during his exile (vanavasa). According to local tradition, he once caught a deer (harin in Marathi), which is said to be the origin of the name.

=== Shri Nrusiha Mandir ===
Prahlad Varad Shri Laxmi Nrusiha Mandir is a temple dedicated to Lord Narasimha, situated on the banks of the Painganga River. The idol is considered one of the oldest in the city, dating back to the 4th century CE (pre-Vakataka period). It was rediscovered in 1479.

=== Mahanubhaviya Shri Krishna Temple ===
The Mahanubhaviya Shri Krishna Temple is an important religious site associated with the Mahanubhava sect. The temple is linked to the 13th-century saint Chakradhar Swami, founder of the Mahanubhava tradition, who is believed to have resided here for about ten months. The temple is considered one of the charankit sthalas (sacred sites marked by the presence of Chakradhar Swami). The परिसर (premises) includes multiple associated sacred locations connected with events described in the Leelacharitra, a key text of the sect. Devotees visit these 13 sacred spots as part of their pilgrimage.

=== Shri Sharangdhar Balaji Temple ===
The Balaji Temple at Mehkar is one of the principal historical and cultural landmarks of the town. It enshrines a large monolithic idol of Vishnu in the form of Sharangadhara (Balaji), carved from a single block of dark stone and measuring approximately 10–11 feet in height.

The idol was discovered on 7 December 1888 during excavation work near the Painganga River, when labourers unearthed a large wooden casket containing the main idol, a smaller accompanying image, and copper plate inscriptions (tamrapat). The discovery drew the attention of British authorities, who reportedly intended to remove the idol to England.

According to local accounts, the then Tehsildar Ambadas Santo Deshpande, along with local officials such as Ranganath Joshi and prominent residents including Janakiram Appa Pathak and Rambhau Bhite Patil, played a key role in preventing the removal of the idol. They organised the immediate performance of pran-pratistha (ritual consecration), after which the idol could not be relocated under prevailing religious customs.

It is further reported that following these events, several individuals involved faced punitive action from the colonial authorities, including imprisonment and administrative penalties. The copper plate inscriptions discovered alongside the idol were taken by British officials and are believed to be preserved in the British Museum, London.

A temple structure was subsequently constructed in the late 19th century through public contributions to house the idol. The present complex includes a sabhamandapa (assembly hall) and associated facilities for devotees, and remains an important centre of religious activity in the Vidarbha region.

=== Kanchani Mahal ===
Kanchani Mahal is a historical structure in Mehkar associated with local legends. Architecturally, it reflects Mughal-style construction and is believed to have served as a military camp or residence for a high-ranking officer during the Mughal period, possibly linked to campaigns during the time of Chhatrapati Shivaji Maharaj.

Local folklore describes it as a seven-storeyed palace built for a courtesan (kanchani). It is said that she later committed suicide due to social ridicule. Presently, only two storeys remain, and the structure is in a dilapidated condition. The monument is estimated by locals to be around 400 years old. Further historical verification is required.

N G Deshpande, renowned poet of Maharashtra, composed extensively on Kanchan Mahal. Kiran Shivhar Dongardive, another renowned poet from Mehkar has composed some poems on Kanchani Mahal.

== Notable people ==
• Nagorao Ghanashyam Deshpande

• Prataprao Jadhav

• Siddharth Kharat
