= Sukhdev Nanaji Kale =

Indian politician

Member of Parliament, Lok Sabha
- In office 1989–1991
- Preceded by: Mukul Wasnik
- Succeeded by: Mukul Wasnik
- Constituency: Buldhana

Personal details
- Born: 23 August 1955 (age 70) Chincholi, Buldhana district
- Party: Bharatiya Janata Party
- Spouse: Asha (m. 1975)
- Children: 1 son, 1 daughter
- Profession: Agriculturist, Politician

Sukhdev Nanaji Kale was a member of the 9th Lok Sabha. He represented the Buldhana Lok Sabha constituency of Maharashtra and is a member of the Bharatiya Janata Party political party.
