= Prataprao Jadhav =

Indian politician (born 1960)

Prataprao Ganpatrao Jadhav
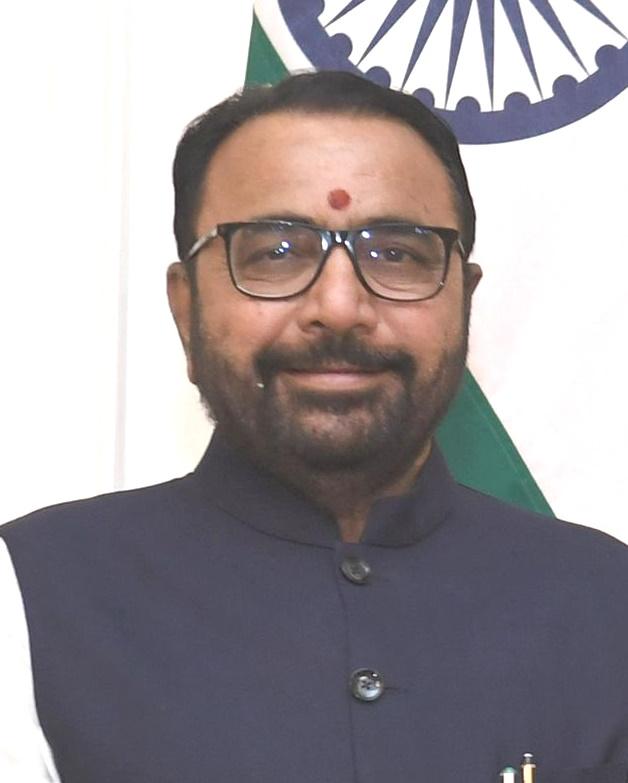
- Jadhav, c. 2024

Union Minister of State (Independent Charge) for AYUSH
- Incumbent
- Assumed office 10 June 2024
- Prime Minister: Narendra Modi
- Preceded by: Sarbananda Sonowal

Union Minister of State for Health and Family Welfare
- Incumbent
- Assumed office 10 June 2024 Serving with Anupriya Patel
- Minister: Jagat Prakash Nadda
- Preceded by: S. P. Singh Baghel

Member of Parliament, Lok Sabha
- Incumbent
- Assumed office 16 May 2009
- Preceded by: Anandrao Vithoba Adsul
- Constituency: Buldhana, Maharashtra

Member of Maharashtra Legislative Assembly
- In office 1995–2009
- Preceded by: Subodh Keshav Saoji
- Succeeded by: Sanjay Bhashkar Raimulkar
- Constituency: Mehkar

Minister of State in Maharashtra
- In office 1997–1999
- Chief Minister: Manohar Joshi; Narayan Rane
- Department: Irrigation, Sports & Youth Welfare

Personal details
- Born: 25 November 1960 (age 65) Mehkar, Maharashtra, India
- Party: Shiv Sena
- Spouse: Rajshree Jadhav (m. 1983)
- Children: 2

Prataprao Ganpatrao Jadhav (born 25 November 1960) is an Indian politician who is serving as the 3rd Minister of Ayush since 2024. He is a member of the Shiv Sena and has been elected to the Lok Sabha for four consecutive terms since 2009, representing the Buldhana Lok Sabha constituency in Maharashtra .Jadhav began his political career in 1986 and served three terms as a member of the Maharashtra Legislative Assembly from 1995 to 2009. During this period, he also held the position of minister of state for Sports, Youth Welfare, and Irrigation in the Shiv Sena-BJP Government of Maharashtra from 1997 to 1999. In addition to his political roles, Jadhav is actively involved in various community initiatives and social welfare programmes.

== Early life ==
Prataprao was born on 25 November 1960 in Mehkar, a town in the Buldhana district of Maharashtra, India. He is the son of Ganpatrao Jadhav and Sindhutai Jadhav. Growing up in a family with a strong agricultural background, Jadhav developed an early connection to farming and rural development. He belongs to the Maratha community.

Jadhav studied at Shri Shivaji College in Chikhli, Maharashtra, where he did not graduate, completing only up to the second year of a Bachelor of Arts (B.A.) course in 1979.

In addition to his studies, Jadhav was involved in various extracurricular activities, including sports such as Kabaddi and Cricket, which he continues to enjoy in his personal time. His early life experiences in Mehkar and his engagement with the local community influenced his future political career.

== Political career ==
Jadhav began his political journey in 1986 when he joined the Shiv Sena party. His early political career focused on strengthening the party's presence in the Buldhana district, an area traditionally dominated by the Indian National Congress.

In 1995, Jadhav won his first election to the Maharashtra Legislative Assembly from the Mehkar Assembly constituency. Following the Shiv Sena-BJP alliance's victory, he was appointed the Minister of State for Sports, Youth Welfare, and Irrigation under Chief Minister Manohar Joshi. Jadhav retained his seat in the 1999 and 2004 state assembly elections, completing three consecutive terms as an MLA.

Jadhav transitioned to national politics in 2009 when he was elected to the Lok Sabha from the Buldhana Lok Sabha constituency. He secured consecutive victories in the 2014 and 2019 general elections, establishing himself as a prominent figure in Maharashtra politics. During his tenure as an MP, he has been actively involved in parliamentary activities, including asking 511 questions and participating in 19 debates.

In 2024, Jadhav was re-elected to the Lok Sabha for a fourth consecutive term. His loyalty to the Shiv Sena, particularly during the party's split, and his alignment with Eknath Shinde's faction citing 'Hindutva' further solidified his political standing. Following his re-election, Jadhav was appointed the Minister of Ayush in the Union Cabinet.

Throughout his political career, Jadhav has focused on various developmental initiatives, including improving educational opportunities, especially for girls, and implementing economic welfare policies for farmers. He has also been actively involved in organising community events such as health and blood donation camps, yoga sessions, career guidance camps, and agricultural exhibitions.

== Positions held ==
Prataprao Ganpatrao Jadhav has held several significant positions throughout his political career:

- Member of the Maharashtra Legislative Assembly (1995–2009)
- Minister of State for Sports, Youth Welfare, and Irrigation, Government of Maharashtra (1997–1999)
- Member of Parliament, Lok Sabha (2009–present)
- Chairperson, Standing Committee on Rural Development and Panchayati Raj
- Chairperson, Standing Committee on Communications and Information Technology
- President, Central Rural Development Committee of India
- Union Minister of State (Independent Charge), Ministry of Ayush (2024–present)
- Union Minister of State, Ministry of Health and Family Welfare (2024–present)
