= Republican Party of India (Khobragade) =

Political party in India

The Republican Party of India (Khobragade) is a political party in India, a splinter group of the Republican Party of India and named for its leader, B. D. Khobragade. Sunil Harishchand Ramteke is the national president.

RPI(K) has now united with all other factions of the RPI, except Prakash Ambedkar's Bharipa Bahujan Mahasangha, to form Republican Party of India (United).

== National activity ==
The party's last national representation was after the 1977 Indian general election, where it contested twelve seats, and won two, with a total of 956,072 votes. The two successful candidates were Daulat Gunaji Gawai, in Buldhana, Maharashtra, and Lal Hemraj Jain in Balaghat Kacharu, Madhya Pradesh. After this, it contested twenty-five seats in the 1984 Indian general election, receiving a total of 383,022 votes; two seats in the 1984 Indian general election, receiving a total of 165,320 votes; nineteen seats in the 1989 Indian general election, receiving a total of 486,615 votes; six seats in the 1991 Indian general election, receiving a total of 91,557 votes; and three in the 1996 Indian general election, receiving a total of 8,491 votes. It did not contest the 1999 Indian general election, but in the 1998 Indian general election, it contested one seat in Madhya Pradesh, receiving 2,167 votes.

RPI(K) contested one seat in Chhattisgarh in the 2004 Indian general election, receiving 4,790 votes.
