= Siddharth Kharat =

Indian politician

Member of the Maharashtra Legislative Assembly
- Incumbent
- Assumed office 23 November 2024
- Preceded by: Sanjay Raimulkar
- Constituency: Mehkar constituency

Personal details
- Born: Budhana Maharashtra, India
- Party: Shiv Sena (Uddhav Balasaheb Thackeray)
- Parent: Rambhau Kharat (father)
- Education: MA (English)
- Alma mater: BAMU University
- Profession: Bureaucrat, Politician

Siddharth Kharat is an Indian politician from the state of Maharashtra. Kharat became first time Member of the Legislative Assembly by winning the Mehkar Assembly constituency from Buldhana district in the 2024. He represented Shiv Sena (UBT) and defeated the sitting MLA Sanjay Raimulkar of Shiv Sena. Earlier, he worked as joint secretary in the state government and took voluntary retirement in July 2024.

== Political career ==
Siddharth Kharat entered politics through the Shiv Sena (UBT) and contested the 2024 elections from the Mehkar Assembly constituency and was elected as an MLA for the first time, defeating his nearest rival, Shiv Sena candidate Sanjay Raimulkar, by a majority of 4819 votes.

He emerged victorious with 1,04,242 votes, while Sanjay Raimulkar got 99,423 votes.
