= Shivram Rango Rane =

Indian politician

Member of the 1st Lok Sabha
- Constituency: Bhusaval

Member of the 2nd Lok Sabha
- Constituency: Buldhana

Member of the 3rd Lok Sabha
- Constituency: Buldhana

Member of the 4th Lok Sabha
- Constituency: Buldhana

Personal details
- Born: 1901 Vivra village (Bk.), District Jalgaon, Bombay State
- Died: 1970 (aged 68–69)
- Spouse: Rambhabai
- Children: 3 sons, 3 daughters
- Education: Amalner, Jalgaon, Poona
- Profession: Politician, Lawyer

Shivram Rango Rane (born 1901 in Vivra village (Bk.), District Jalgaon, Bombay State; died 1970) was a politician from Bombay State. He studied at Amalner, Jalgaon and Poona and practised at the Bar during 1930–52. He was a member and secretary of the Kandesh College Education Society, Jalgaon. He was a member of the Bombay Legislative Assembly during 1947–51.

He was member of 1st Lok Sabha from Bhusaval (Lok Sabha constituency). He was elected to 2nd, 3rd and 4th Lok Sabha from Buldhana (Lok Sabha constituency). He was the Deputy Chief Whip of the Congress Party during 1957–66.

He married Rambhabai and has 3 sons and 3 daughters.
