= Daulat Gunaji Gawai =

Indian politician

Member of Parliament, Lok Sabha
- Constituency: Buldhana

Personal details
- Born: Shirpur, Buldana, India
- Party: Republican Party of India

Daulat Gunaji Gawai (born 1 June 1929 in Shirpur, Buldhana district, Maharashtra) was a member of the 6th Lok Sabha of India. He represented the Buldhana Lok Sabha constituency of Maharashtra and was a member of the Republican Party of India.
