= Manoj Kayande =

Indian politician

Manoj Devanand Kayande
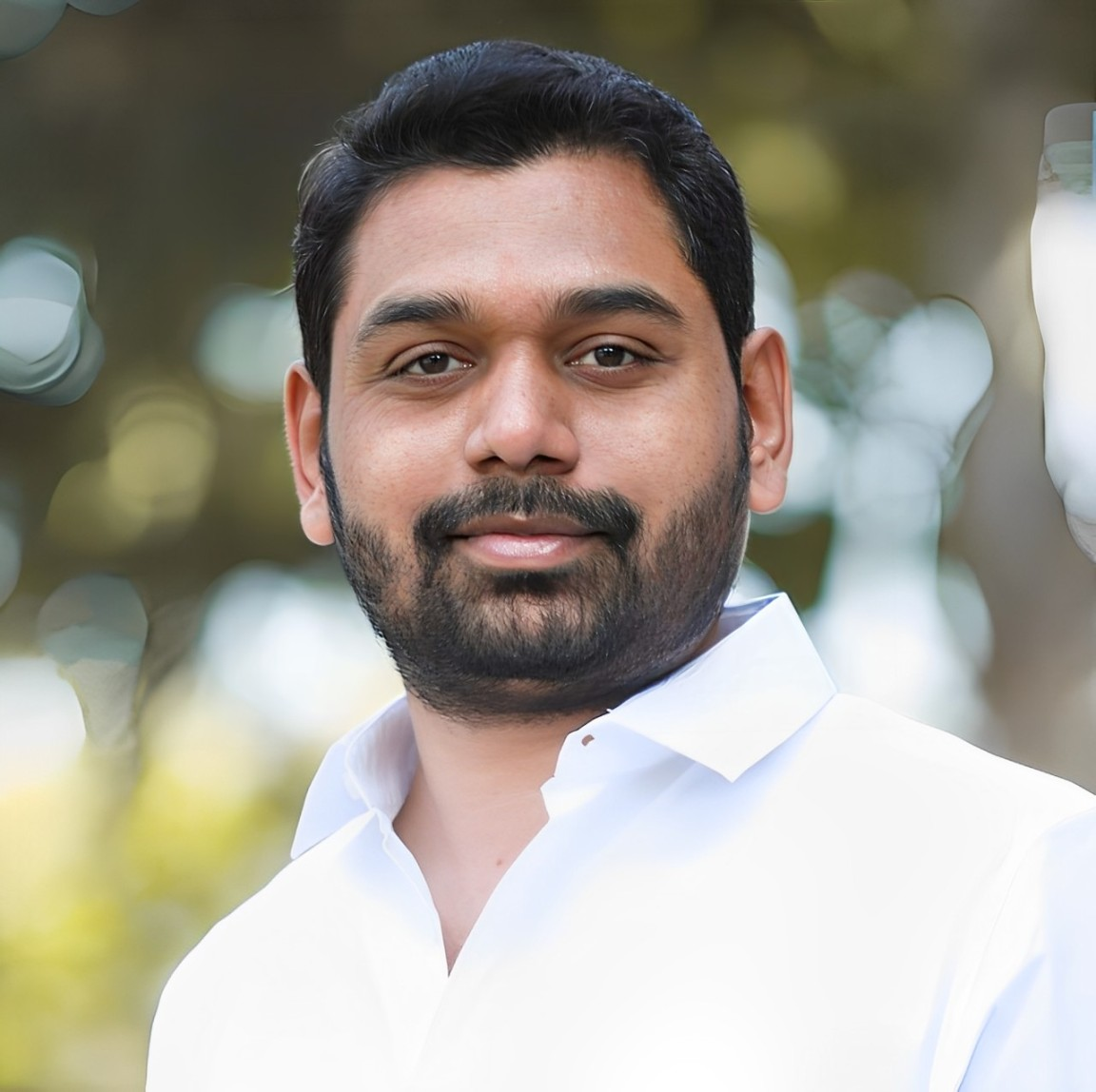
- Manoj Kayande, Member of Legislative Assembly (MLA) from Sindkhed Raja, Maharashtra

Member of Maharashtra Legislative Assembly
- Incumbent
- Assumed office 2024
- Preceded by: Rajendra Shingne
- Constituency: Sindkhed Raja

Personal details
- Born: 23 June 1989 (age 37) Deulgaon Raja, Buldhana district, Maharashtra, India
- Party: Nationalist Congress Party
- Spouse: Varsha Kayande
- Education: BA
- Alma mater: Sant Gadge Baba Amravati University
- Profession: Politician
- Website: Official Website

Manoj Devanand Kayande (born 1989) is an Indian politician from Maharashtra. He is a member of the Maharashtra Legislative Assembly from Sindkhed Raja Assembly constituency in Buldhana district. He won the 2024 Maharashtra Legislative Assembly election, representing the Nationalist Congress Party.

== Early life and education ==
Kayande is from Deulgaon Raja, Buldhana district, Maharashtra. He is the son of Devanand Khanduji Kayande. He completed his BA in 2014 at Shri Vyankatesh Arts, Commerce and Science College, Deulgaon Raja, which is affiliated with Sant Gadge Baba Amravati University, Amravati.

== Career ==
Kayande won from Sindkhed Raja Assembly constituency representing Nationalist Congress Party in the 2024 Maharashtra Legislative Assembly election. He polled 73,413 votes and defeated his nearest rival, Rajendra Shingne of Nationalist Congress Party (SP), by a margin of 4,650 votes.
