= Balkrishna Ramchandra Wasnik =

Indian politician

- Born: 12 August 1929
- Died: 10 December 2015 (aged 86); Nagpur
- Political party: Indian National Congress
- Children: 3 including Mukul Wasnik

Balkrishna Ramchandra Wasnik (12 August 1929 – 10 September 2015) was an Indian politician and member of the Indian National Congress.

== Political career ==
In 1957, at the age of 28 he was elected from Gondia Lok Sabha constituency and he was re-elected in 1962 from Bhandara lok sabha constituency. Afterwards from Buldhana in (1980). He was a staunch supporter of separate Vidarbha.

In 1967, he became President of the Mahavidarbha Rajya Sangharsh Samiti and mobilized the agitation to press for this demand.

== Family ==
He belongs to an Ambedkarite Buddhist family. He hails from Mahar community and has a son, Mukul Wasnik two daughters, Dipti Wasnik Saxena and Seema Wasnik.

== Death ==
He died on 10 September 2015 in Nagpur, aged 86.
