= Shiv Sena (Eknath Shinde) =

Political party in Maharashtra, India

- Abbreviation: SHS
- Leader: Eknath Shinde
- Chairperson: Eknath Shinde
- Parliamentary Chairperson: Shrirang Barne
- Rajya Sabha Leader: Milind Deora
- Lok Sabha Leader: Shrikant Shinde
- Founder: Eknath Shinde (present incarnation); Balasaheb Thackeray (previous incarnation)
- Founded: 10 October 2022
- Preceded by: Shiv Sena (1966–2022)
- Headquarters: Anand Ashram, Thane, Thane district, Maharashtra, India
- Student wing: Bharatiya Vidyarthi Sena (BVS)
- Youth wing: Yuva Sena
- Women's wing: Shiv Sena Mahila Aghadi
- Ideology: Conservatism (Indian); Social conservatism Marathi regionalism Hindutva; Hindu nationalism Ultranationalism; Economic nationalism Right-wing populism
- Political position: Right wing to far-right
- Colours: Orange
- ECI status: State Party
- Alliance: National Alliance NDA (since 2022); Regional Alliances Maha Yuti (since 2022)
- Seats in Rajya Sabha: 2 / 245
- Seats in Lok Sabha: 13 / 543
- Seats in Maharashtra Legislative Council: 11 / 78
- Seats in State Legislative Assemblies: List 57 / 288 (Maharashtra Legislative Assembly) 2 / 200 (Rajasthan Legislative Assembly)

Election symbol

Party flag
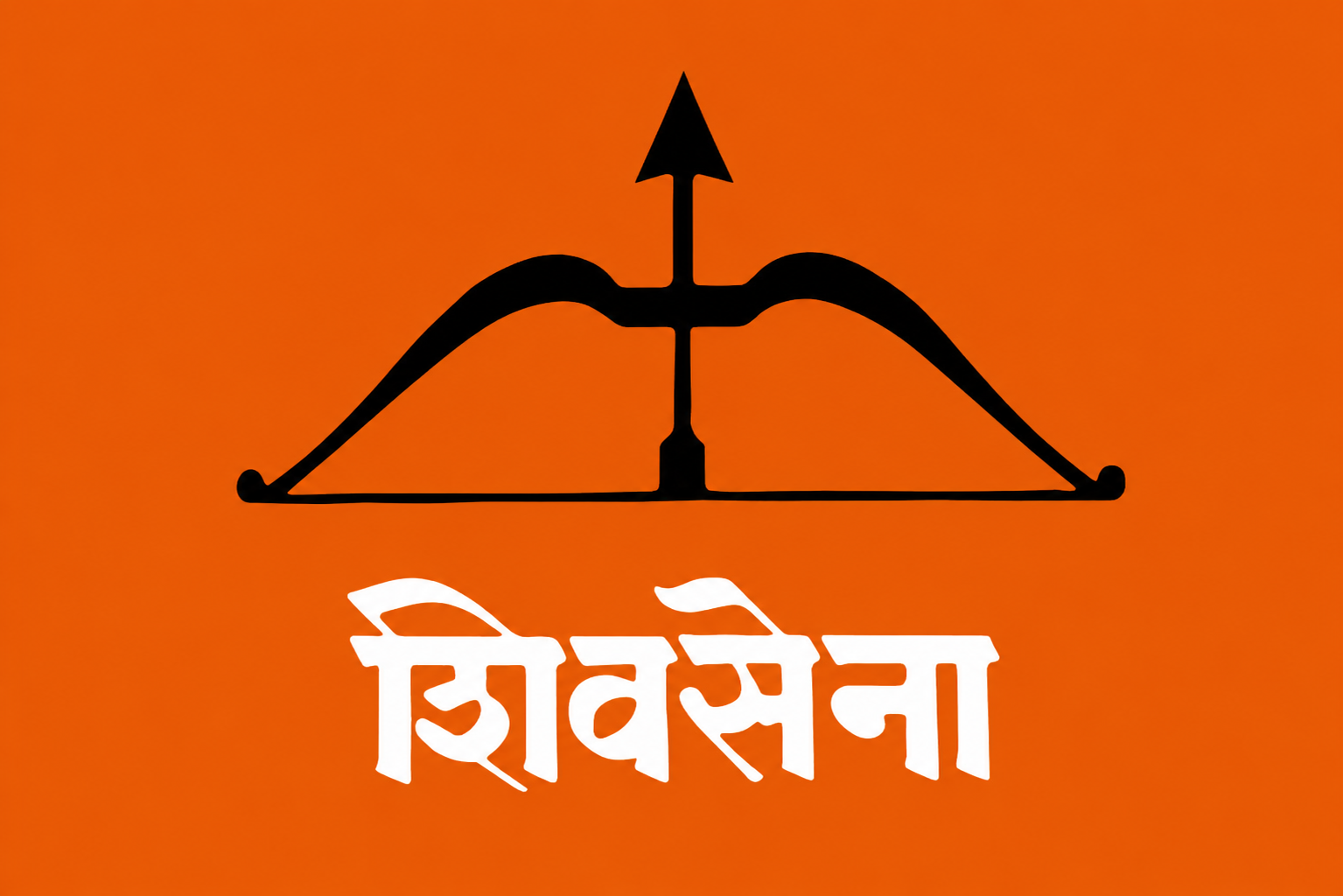

Website
- shivsenacentraloffice.com

Shiv Sena (Śiva Sēnā; lit. 'Army of Shivaji'; abbr. SHS) is a Hindutva political party in India, primarily based in the state of Maharashtra.

Formed by a split in 2022 of Shiv Sena, the party has been led by Eknath Shinde, who was recognised by the Election Commission of India as the leader of the original Shiv Sena. The Shinde-led faction retained the party's traditional name and the iconic bow and arrow symbol, and currently forms the government in Maharashtra in alliance with the Bharatiya Janata Party (BJP). The party continues to position itself as the true ideological successor to Bal Thackeray’s legacy.

== Background and formation ==
Shiv Sena was founded on 19 June 1966 by Bal Thackeray, initially as a movement to promote the interests of the Marathi people in Mumbai and Maharashtra. Over time, the party expanded its ideology to include Hindutva and Hindu nationalism.

Balasahebanchi Shivsena was formed after a split in the Shiv Sena party due to an uprising led by Eknath Shinde, who had the support of the majority of the party's MLAs. The split was caused by Shinde's disagreement with Uddhav Thackeray's decision to continue with the Maha Vikas Aghadi coalition, despite Shinde and the majority of the party's MLAs requesting a break from the coalition. The split led to both factions claiming ownership of Shiv Sena. The Election Commission intervened and asked both factions to come up with new party names until the issue was resolved, resulting in the formation of Balasahebanchi Shiv Sena. Meanwhile, Uddhav Thackeray formed his faction as Shiv Sena (Uddhav Balasaheb Thackeray).

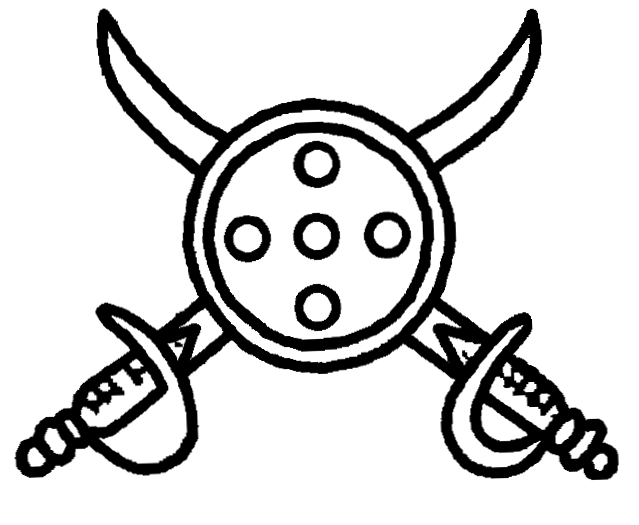
Symbol used in 2022 municipal polls

Shinde subsequently filed a petition with the Election Commission of India staking his claim to the 'Shiv Sena' name and the Bow and Arrow symbol. The ECI ruled in favour of Shinde's faction based on the strength of its legislative wing, rather than on the organizational wing. Thackeray appealed against the decision, and the case is currently pending in the Supreme Court.

On 17 July 2025, the Republican Sena, led by Anandraj Ambedkar, and Shiv Sena, led by Eknath Shinde, formed a political alliance.

== Headquarters ==
Shiva Sena's headquarters and main office is situated at Anand Dighe's house in Thane. Dighe was the mentor of Shiva Sena Mukhy neta (Main leader) Eknath Shinde. On 24 February 2023, the headquarters was founded, relocating from Shivsena Bhavan after Shinde split from the party; while Thackeray retained control over Shivsena Bhavan.

=== Chief Ministers ===
No.	Portrait	Name	Constituency	From	To	Duration
1		Eknath Shinde	Kopri-Pachpakhadi	30 June 2022	5 December 2024	2 years, 158 days

=== Deputy Chief Ministers ===
No.	Portrait	Name	Constituency	From	To	Duration	Chief Minister
1		Eknath Shinde	Kopri-Pachpakhadi	5 December 2024	Incumbent	1 year, 305 days	Devendra Fadnavis

== List of Union Ministers ==
No.	Photo	Portfolio	Name (Lifespan)	Assumed office	Left office	Duration	Constituency (House)	Prime Minister	
1		Minister of AYUSH [MoS(I/C)]	Prataprao Ganpatrao Jadhav (born 1960)	10 June 2024	Incumbent	2 years, 118 days	Buldhana (Lok Sabha)	Prime Minister	Narendra Modi
1		Minister of Health & Family Welfare (MoS)	Prataprao Ganpatrao Jadhav (born 1960)	10 June 2024	Incumbent	2 years, 118 days	Buldhana (Lok Sabha)		Narendra Modi

== Leaders ==
List of leaders of Shiv Sena
No.	Name	Photo	Designation
1	Eknath Shinde		Founder and National President; Deputy Chief Minister of Maharashtra, Former Chief Minister of Maharashtra, Leader Maharashtra Legislative Assembly
2	Shrikant Shinde		Leader, Lok Sabha
3	Shrirang Barne		Parliamentary Chairperson
4	Milind Deora		Leader, Rajya Sabha
5	Viplav Bajoria		Leader, Maharashtra Legislative Council

=== List of Lok Sabha members ===
No.	Name	Constituency
1	Prataprao Ganpatrao Jadhav	Buldhana
2	Sanjay Deshmukh	Yavatmal-Washim
3	Nagesh Bapurao Patil Ashtikar	Hingoli
4	Sanjay Haribhau Jadhav	Parbhani
5	Sandipanrao Bhumre	Aurangabad
6	Shrikant Shinde	Kalyan
7	Naresh Mhaske	Thane
8	Ravindra Waikar	Mumbai North West
9	Sanjay Dina Patil	Mumbai North East
10	Shrirang Barne	Maval
11	Bhausaheb Rajaram Wakchaure	Shirdi
12	Omprakash Rajenimbalkar	Osmanabad
13	Dhairyasheel Sambhajirao Mane	Hatkanangle

=== List of Rajya Sabha members ===
No.	Name	Date of appointment	Date of retirement
1	Milind Deora	5 July 2024	4 July 2030

== Electoral performance ==
The first face off between Balasahebanchi Shiv Sena and Shiv Sena (Uddhav Balasaheb Thackeray) was in 2022 Maharashtra Gram Panchayat Polls where Maha Vikas Aghadi won 257 gram panchayat seats while Mahayuti won 497 seats. The Shiv Sena (Uddhav Balasaheb Thackeray) won 53 seats and Balasahebanchi Shiv Sena won 170 seats. The first major contest occurred in the 2024 Lok Sabha election, where the party rechristened as the Shiv Sena after being granted the symbol by the ECI secured 7 seats leading to a loss of 6 seats while Shiv Sena (UBT) won 9 gaining 4, since the party had split. In the 2024 Maharashtra Legislative Assembly election, the party won 57 seats, gaining 19 seats, nearly 3 times of SS UBT.

=== Indian General Election results (In Maharashtra) ===
Year	Party leader	Seats won/ Seats contested	Change in Seats	Voteshare (%)	+/- (%)	Popular vote	Outcome
2024	Eknath Shinde	7 / 15	New	12.95%	New	73,77,674	Government

=== State Assembly elections ===
Year	Seats won	Change in seats
Maharashtra
2024	57 / 288	New
