= Yadav Shivram Mahajan =

Indian politician (1911–2001)

Member of Parliament
- In office 1970–1977
- Constituency: Buldhana

Member of Parliament from Jalgaon
- In office 1980–1991

Personal details
- Born: 22 November 1911 Himgona, Jalgaon district, Maharashtra, British India
- Died: 27 August 2001 (aged 89) Jalgaon, Maharashtra, India
- Party: INC
- Children: 2 sons, 1 daughter
- Profession: Teacher and Educationist, Economist
- As of 23 February, 2012

Yadav Shivram Mahajan (22 November 1911 – 27 August 2001) was an Indian politician who was a member of the Lok Sabha from the Buldhana constituency of Maharashtra elected in 1970 by-elections. He was a member of the Indian National Congress (INC) political party.

Mahajan was born on 22 November 1911. He was educated at London School of Economics and the Middle Temple, London. He was married to Mrs Sarojini and had 2 sons and 1 daughter and resides at Jalgaon.

Mahajan was elected to the 4th and 5th Lok Sabha from Buldhan, and to 7th, 8th and 9th Lok Sabha from Jalgaon.

Mahajan worked as Member of District Congress Committee for 5 years and Executive Member of Pradesh Congress Committee of Maharashtra for 2 years

Mahajan died in Jalgaon, Maharashtra on 27 August 2001, at the age of 90.

== Major works ==
- Industrialisation of Karnataka
- Studies in Agricultural Production and Family Planning
