= Sivaraman =

Sivaraman may refer to:

- Athippatta Sivaraman, better known as A. S. Nair, a painter, illustrator and cartoonist from Kerala, India
- Sivaraman Cheriyanad (1941–2019), Malayalam-language writer from Kerala, India
- Kottakkal Sivaraman (1936–2010), revolutionised the portrayal of female roles in classical dance-drama from Kerala in southern India
- S. Sivaraman, Indian politician and former Member of the Legislative Assembly of Tamil Nadu
- Umayalpuram K. Sivaraman (born 1935), Indian mridangam player

== See also ==
- Savaran (disambiguation)
- Sivaram (disambiguation)
