= Food and Drug Administration, Maharashtra =

Government organization

Food and Drug Administration, Maharashtra State, is Maharashtra's primary instrument of consumer protection. It is a law enforcement agency. In 1970, the Government of Maharashtra entrusted the responsibility of enforcement of the Prevention of Food Adulteration Act, 1954 to FDA which is when it got its present name.
