= Sumatitai Suklikar =

Indian politician

Sumati Suklikar (24 December 1923 - 22 February 2011), was an Indian politician. She was a leader of Bharatiya Janata Party and its precursor Bharatiya Jana Sangh, and was from Nagpur, Maharashtra. She contested elections for Maharashtra Legislative Assembly four times in 1960s and 1970s. She died on 22 February 2011 due to old age.

The first time she contested an assembly election, in 1962, from Nagpur West, she stood fourth. Gradually, her party's popularity increased and she came second the next 3 times, but she could never win the seat. After losing in 1978, she retired from electoral politics, but remained an active worker with BJP.

She had a brother-like relation with the veteran Communist Party of India leader A. B. Bardhan from Nagpur. Although they contested elections against each other. Sumatitai was like an elder sister to Bardhan. In 2018, Maharashtra state government launched a scheme named 'Sumatibai Suklikar Yojana' in Sumati-bai's memory to effect social upliftment of women in rural parts of the state.

Alankar Talkies Chowk, Ambazari Road, Nagpur, Maharashtra was renamed after her as "Lokmata Sumatitai Suklikar Chowk" and a copper mural was installed there as a tribute to her social and political work. It was inaugurated by the then" Minister for Road Transport and Highways Nitin Gadkari" on 18 June 2023.
