= Ministry of Sanitation (Maharashtra) =

Maharashtra government ministry responsible for Sanitation

Ministry of Sanitation Government of Maharashtra
- मंत्रालय स्वच्छता विभाग, महाराष्ट्र शासन
- Seal of the state of Maharashtra

- Building of Administrative Headquarters of Mumbai

Ministry overview
- Jurisdiction: (India) Maharashtra
- Headquarters: Mantralay, Mumbai
- Minister responsible: Gulab Raghunath Patil, Cabinet Minister
- Deputy Minister responsible: Meghana Bordikar, Minister of State
- Ministry executive: (IAS)
- Parent department: Government of Maharashtra

The Ministry of Sanitation is a ministry of the Government of Maharashtra state. The ministry is headed by a cabinet-level minister. Gulab Raghunath Patil is the current Minister of Sanitation.

== Head office ==
Minister of Sanitation मंत्री स्वच्छता विभाग
- Emblem of India

- Flag of India
- Incumbent; Gulab Raghunath Patil since 21 December 2024
- Ministry of Sanitation (Maharashtra)
- Style: The Honourable
- Abbreviation: Cabinet Minister
- Member of: State Cabinet
- Reports to: Chief Minister, Maharashtra Legislature
- Seat: Mantralaya, Mumbai
- Appointer: Governor on the advice of the Chief Minister
- Term length: 5 years
- Precursor: Devendra Fadnavis (2024-2024)
- Inaugural holder: Shantilal Shah (1960-1962)
- Formation: 1 May 1960
- Deputy: Meghana Bordikar

== Cabinet Ministers ==
No.	Portrait	Minister (Constituency)	Term of office			Political party	Ministry	Chief Minister
No.	Portrait	Minister (Constituency)	From	To	Period	Political party	Ministry	Chief Minister
Minister of Sanitation
01		Shantilal Shah (MLA for Vile Parle Constituency No. 177- Mumbai Suburban District (Legislative Assembly)	01 May 1960	07 March 1962	1 year, 310 days	Indian National Congress	Yashwantrao I	Yashwantrao Chavan
02		Shantilal Shah (MLA for Vile Parle Constituency No. 177- Mumbai Suburban District (Legislative Assembly)	08 March 1962	19 November 1962	256 days	Indian National Congress	Yashwantrao II	Yashwantrao Chavan
03		D. S. Palapsagar (MLC for Elected by MLAs Constituency No. 19 - Bhandara District) (Legislative Council)	20 November 1962	24 November 1963	1 year, 4 days	Indian National Congress	Kannamwar l	Marotrao Kannamwar
04		Parashuram Krishnaji Sawant (MLA for Chiplun Constituency No. 265- Ratnagiri District) (Legislative Assembly) (Interim Chief Minister)	25 November 1962	04 December 1963	9 days	Indian National Congress	Sawant	Parashuram Krishnaji Sawant
05		Balasaheb Desai (MLA for Patan Constituency No. 261- Satara District) (Legislative Assembly)	05 December 1963	01 March 1967	3 years, 86 days	Indian National Congress	Vasantrao I	Vasantrao Naik
06		Nirmala Raje Bhosale (MLA for Satara Constituency No. 268- Satara District) (Legislative Assembly)	01 March 1967	27 October 1969	2 years, 240 days	Indian National Congress	Vasantrao II	Vasantrao Naik
07		Narendra Mahipati Tidke (MLA for Savner Constituency No. 49- Nagpur District) (Legislative Assembly)	27 October 1969	13 March 1972	2 years, 138 days	Indian National Congress	Vasantrao II	Vasantrao Naik
08		Anant Namjoshi (MLA for Girgaon Constituency No. 185- Mumbai City District) (Legislative Assembly)	13 March 1972	04 April 1973	1 year, 32 days	Indian National Congress	Vasantrao III	Vasantrao Naik
09		Hari Govindrao Vartak (MLA for Bassein-Vasai Constituency No. 180- Palghar District (Legislative Assembly)	04 April 1973	17 Match; 1974	347 days	Indian National Congress	Vasantrao III	Vasantrao Naik
10		Vasantrao Naik (MLA for Pusad Constituency No. 81- Yavatmal District) (Legislative Assembly) (Chief Minister)	17 Match; 1974	21 February 1975	341 days	Indian National Congress	Vasantrao III	Vasantrao Naik
11		Vasantdada Patil (MLC for Elected by MLAs Constituency No. 20 - Sangli District) (Legislative Council)	21 February 1975	16 April 1977	2 years, 54 days	Indian National Congress	Shankarrao I	Shankarrao Chavan
12		Nashikrao Tirpude (MLA for Bhandara Constituency No. 61- Bhandara District) (Legislative Assembly)	17 April 1977	07 March 1978	1 year, 324 days	Indian National Congress	Vasantdada I	Vasantdada Patil
13		Shivajirao Patil Nilangekar (MLA for Nilanga Constituency No. 238- Latur District) (Legislative Assembly)	07 March 1978	18 July 1978	133 days	Indian National Congress	Vasantdada II	Vasantdada Patil
14		Pramila Tople (MLA for Akola Constituency No. 15- Akola District (Legislative Assembly)	18 July 1978	18 February 1980	1 year, 215 days	Indian Congress (Socialist)	Pawar I	Sharad Pawar
15		Abdul Rahman Antulay (MLA for Shrivardhan Constituency No. 193- Raigad District) (Legislative Assembly) (Chief Minister)	09 June 1980	21 January 1982	1 year, 226 days	Indian National Congress	Antulay	Abdul Rahman Antulay
16		Babasaheb Bhosale (MLA for Nehrunagar Constituency No. 172- Mumbai Suburban District) (Legislative Assembly) (Chief Minister)	21 January 1982	02 February 1983	1 year, 12 days	Indian National Congress	Bhosale	Babasaheb Bhosale
17		Vasantdada Patil (MLA for Sangli Constituency No. 282- Sangli District) (Legislative Assembly) (Chief Minister)	07 February 1983	05 March 1985	2 years, 26 days	Indian National Congress	Vasantdada III	Vasantdada Patil
18		Vasantdada Patil (MLA for Sangli Constituency No. 282- Sangli District) (Legislative Assembly) (Chief Minister)	12 March 1985	03 June 1985	83 days	Indian National Congress	Vasantdada IV	Vasantdada Patil
19		Shivajirao Patil Nilangekar (MLA for Nilanga Constituency No. 238- Latur District) (Legislative Assembly) (Chief Minister)	03 June 1985	12 March 1986	282 days	Indian National Congress	Nilangekar	Shivajirao Patil Nilangekar
20		Shankarrao Chavan (MLC for Elected by MLAs Constituency No. 08 - Nanded District) (Legislative Council) (Chief Minister)	12 March 1986	26 June 1988	2 years, 106 days	Indian National Congress	Shankarrao II	Shankarrao Chavan
21		Sharad Pawar (MLA for Baramati Constituency No. 201- Pune District) (Legislative Assembly) (Chief Minister)	26 June 1988	03 March 1990	1 year, 250 days	Indian National Congress	Pawar II	Sharad Pawar
22		Sharad Pawar (MLA for Baramati Constituency No. 201- Pune District) (Legislative Assembly) (Chief Minister)	03 March 1990	25 June 1991	1 year, 114 days	Indian National Congress	Pawar III	Sharad Pawar
23		Sudhakarrao Naik (MLA for Pusad Constituency No. 81- Yavatmal District) (Legislative Assembly) (Chief Minister)	25 June 1991	22 February 1993	1 year, 242 days	Indian National Congress	Sudhakarrao	Sudhakarrao Naik
24		Harshvardhan Deshmukh (MLA for Morshi Constituency No. 43- Amravati District) (Legislative Assembly)	06 March 1993	18 November 1994	1 year, 257 days	Independent Supported Party (Indian National Congress)	Pawar IV	Sharad Pawar
25		Anna Dange (MLC for Elected by MLAs Constituency No. 05 - Sangli District) (Legislative Council)	14 March 1995	01 February 1999	3 years, 324 days	Bharatiya Janata Party	Joshi	Manohar Joshi
26		Jaiprakash Mundada (MLA for Basmath Constituency No. 92- Hingoli District (Legislative Assembly)	01 February 1999	11 May 1999	99 days	Shiv Sena	Rane	Narayan Rane
27		Radhakrishna Vikhe Patil (MLA for Shirdi Constituency No. 218- Ahmednagar District) (Legislative Assembly)	11 May 1999	17 October 1999	159 days	Shiv Sena	Rane	Narayan Rane
Minister of Cleanliness
28		Chhagan Bhujbal (MLC for Elected by MLAs Constituency No. 09 - Mumbai City District) (Legislative Council) (Deputy Chief Minister)	19 October 1999	27 October 1999	8 days	Nationalist Congress Party	Deshmukh I	Vilasrao Deshmukh
29		R. R. Patil (MLA for Tasgaon-Kavathe Mahankal Constituency No. 287- Sangli District) (Legislative Assembly)	27 October 1999	16 January 2003	3 years, 81 days	Nationalist Congress Party	Deshmukh I	Vilasrao Deshmukh
Minister of Sanitation
30		Ashok Chavan (MLA for Mudkhed Constituency No. 85- Nanded District) (Legislative Assembly)	18 January 2003	01 November 2004	1 year, 295 days	Nationalist Congress Party	Sushilkumar	Sushilkumar Shinde
31		R. R. Patil (MLA for Tasgaon-Kavathe Mahankal Constituency No. 287- Sangli District) (Legislative Assembly) (Deputy Chief Minister)	01 November 2004	09 November 2004	8 days	Nationalist Congress Party	Deshmukh II	Vilasrao Deshmukh
32		Ajit Pawar (MLA for Baramati Constituency No. 201- Pune District) (Legislative Assembly)	09 November 2004	01 December 2008	4 years, 22 days	Nationalist Congress Party	Deshmukh II	Vilasrao Deshmukh
33		Ajit Pawar (MLA for Baramati Constituency No. 201- Pune District) (Legislative Assembly)	08 December 2008	06 November 2009	333 days	Nationalist Congress Party	Ashok I	Ashok Chavan
34		Laxmanrao Dhobale (MLA for Mohol Constituency No. 247- Solapur District) (Legislative Assembly)	07 November 2009	10 November 2010	1 year, 3 days	Nationalist Congress Party	Ashok II	Ashok Chavan
35		Laxmanrao Dhobale (MLA for Mohol Constituency No. 247- Solapur District) (Legislative Assembly)	11 November 2010	07 June 2013	2 years, 208 days	Nationalist Congress Party	Prithviraj	Prithviraj Chavan
36		Chhagan Bhujbal (MLA for Yevla Constituency No. 119- Nashik District) (Legislative Assembly); Additional Charge	07 June 2013	11 June 2013	4 days	Nationalist Congress Party	Prithviraj	Prithviraj Chavan
37		Dilip Gangadhar Sopal (MLA for Barshi Constituency No. 246- Osmanabad District) (Legislative Assembly)	11 June 2013	26 September 2014	1 year, 107 days	Nationalist Congress Party	Prithviraj	Prithviraj Chavan
38		Devendra Fadnavis (MLA for Nagpur South West Constituency No. 52- Nagpur District) (Legislative Assembly) (Chief_Minister)	31 October 2014	04 December 2014	34 days	Bharatiya Janata Party	Fadnavis I	Devendra Fadnavis
39		Babanrao Lonikar (MLA for Partur Constituency No. 99- Parbhani District) (Legislative Assembly)	05 December 2014	12 November 2019	4 years, 342 days	Bharatiya Janata Party	Fadnavis I	Devendra Fadnavis
40		Devendra Fadnavis (MLA for Nagpur South West Constituency No. 52- Nagpur District) (Legislative Assembly) (Chief_Minister); In Charge	23 November 2019	28 November 2019	5 days	Bharatiya Janata Party	Fadnavis II	Devendra Fadnavis
41		Eknath Shinde (MLA for Kopri-Pachpakhadi Constituency No. 147- Thane District) (Legislative Assembly)	28 November 2019	30 December 2019	32 days	Shiv Sena	Thackeray	Uddhav Thackeray
42		Gulab Raghunath Patil (MLA for Jalgaon Rural Constituency No. 14- Jalgaon District (Legislative Assembly)	30 December 2019	27 June 2022	2 years, 179 days	Shiv Sena	Thackeray	Uddhav Thackeray
43		Anil Parab (MLC for Elected by MLAs Constituency No. 07 - Ratnagiri District) (Legislative Council); Additional Charge	27 June 2022	29 June 2022	2 days	Shiv Sena	Thackeray	Uddhav Thackeray
44		Eknath Shinde (MLA for Kopri-Pachpakhadi Constituency No. 147- Thane District) (Legislative Assembly) (Chief Minister); In Charge	30 June 2022	14 August 2022	45 days	Shiv Sena (2022–present)	Eknath	Eknath Shinde
45		Gulab Raghunath Patil (MLA for Jalgaon Rural Constituency No. 14- Jalgaon District (Legislative Assembly)	14 August 2022	26 November 2024	2 years, 135 days	Shiv Sena (Shinde Group)	Eknath	Eknath Shinde
46		Devendra Fadnavis (MLA for Nagpur South West Constituency No. 52- Nagpur District) (Legislative Assembly) (Chief_Minister); In Charge	05 December 2024	21 December 2024	16 days	Bharatiya Janata Party	Fadnavis III	Devendra Fadnavis
47		Gulab Raghunath Patil (MLA for Jalgaon Rural Constituency No. 14- Jalgaon District (Legislative Assembly)	21 December 2024	Incumbent	1 year, 261 days	Shiv Sena (2022–present)	Fadnavis III	Devendra Fadnavis

== Ministers of State ==
No.	Portrait	Deputy Minister (Constituency)	Term of office			Political party	Ministry	Minister	Chief Minister
No.	Portrait	Deputy Minister (Constituency)	From	To	Period	Political party	Ministry	Minister	Chief Minister
Deputy Minister of Sanitation
The Post of Deputy Minister / Minister of States has been kept Vacant from 23 November 2019 To 28 November 2019			23 November 2019	28 November 2019	5 days	NA	Fadnavis II	Devendra Fadnavis	Devendra Fadnavis
01		Sanjay Bansode (MLA for Udgir Constituency No. 237- Latur District) (Legislative Assembly)	30 December 2019	29 June 2022	2 years, 181 days	Nationalist Congress Party	Thackeray	Gulab Raghunath Patil	Uddhav Thackeray
The Post of Deputy Minister / Minister of States has been kept Vacant from 30 June 2022			30 June 2022	26 November 2024	2 years, 149 days	NA	Eknath	Eknath Shinde (2022 - 2022); Gulab Raghunath Patil (2022 – 2024)	Eknath Shinde
02		Meghana Bordikar (MLA for Jintur Constituency No. 95- Parbhani District) (Legislative Assembly)	21 December 2024	incumbent	1 year, 261 days	Bharatiya Janata Party	Fadnavis III	Gulab Raghunath Patil (2024 – Present)	Devendra Fadnavis
