= Ministry of Water Supply (Maharashtra) =

Indian government ministry responsible for affirmative action

Ministry of Water Supply, Government of Maharashtra
- मंत्रालय पाणी पुरवठा विभाग, महाराष्ट्र शासन
- Seal of the state of Maharashtra

Ministry overview
- Jurisdiction: (India) Maharashtra
- Headquarters: Mantralay, Mumbai
- Minister responsible: Gulab Raghunath Patil, Cabinet Minister
- Deputy Minister responsible: Meghana Bordikar, Minister of State
- Ministry executive: (IAS)
- Parent department: Government of Maharashtra
- Website: mjp.maharashtra.gov.in/en

The Ministry of Water Supply is a ministry of the Government of Maharashtra. It is responsible for water supply and management of water resources in Maharashtra.

The Ministry is headed by a cabinet level minister. Gulab Raghunath Patil is currently Minister of Water Supply Government of Maharashtra.

== Head office ==
Minister of Water Supply मंत्री पाणी पुरवठा विभाग
- Emblem of India

- Flag of India
- Incumbent; Gulab Raghunath Patil since 21 December 2024
- Ministry of Water Supply (Maharashtra)
- Style: The Honourable
- Abbreviation: Cabinet Minister
- Member of: State Cabinet
- Reports to: Chief Minister, Maharashtra Legislature
- Seat: Mantralaya, Mumbai
- Appointer: Governor on the advice of the Chief Minister
- Term length: 5 years
- Precursor: Devendra Fadnavis (2024-2024)
- Inaugural holder: Shantilal Shah (1960-1962)
- Formation: 01 May 1960
- Deputy: Meghana Bordikar

== Cabinet Ministers ==
No.	Portrait	Minister (Constituency)	Term of office			Political party	Ministry	Chief Minister
No.	Portrait	Minister (Constituency)	From	To	Period	Political party	Ministry	Chief Minister
Minister of Water Supply
01		Vasantrao Naik (MLA for Pusad Constituency No. 81- Yavatmal District) (Legislative Assembly)	01 May 1960	07 March 1962	1 year, 310 days	Indian National Congress	Yashwantrao I	Yashwantrao Chavan
02		Shantilal Shah (MLA for Vile Parle Constituency No. 177- Mumbai Suburban District (Legislative Assembly)	08 March 1962	19 November 1962	256 days	Indian National Congress	Yashwantrao II	Yashwantrao Chavan
03		Abdul Kader Salebhoy (MLA for Mumbai South Central Constituency No. 180- Mumbai City District) (Legislative Assembly)	20 November 1962	24 November 1963	1 year, 4 days	Indian National Congress	Kannamwar l	Marotrao Kannamwar
04		Parashuram Krishnaji Sawant (MLA for Chiplun Constituency No. 265- Ratnagiri District) (Legislative Assembly) (Interim Chief Minister)	25 November 1962	04 December 1963	9 days	Indian National Congress	Sawant	Parashuram Krishnaji Sawant
05		Keshavrao Sonawane (MLA for Latur Constituency No. 235- Latur District) (Legislative Assembly)	05 December 1963	01 March 1967	3 years, 86 days	Indian National Congress	Vasantrao I	Vasantrao Naik
06		Vasantrao Naik (MLA for Pusad Constituency No. 81- Yavatmal District) (Legislative Assembly) (Chief Minister)	01 March 1967	27 October 1969	2 years, 240 days	Indian National Congress	Vasantrao II	Vasantrao Naik
07		Parashuram Krishnaji Sawant (MLA for Chiplun Constituency No. 265- Ratnagiri District) (Legislative Assembly)	27 October 1969	13 March 1972	2 years, 138 days	Indian National Congress	Vasantrao II	Vasantrao Naik
08		Shankarrao Chavan (MLA for Bhokar Constituency No. 85- Nanded District) (Legislative Assembly)	13 March 1972	04 April 1973	1 year, 32 days	Indian National Congress	Vasantrao III	Vasantrao Naik
09		Vasantrao Naik (MLA for Pusad Constituency No. 81- Yavatmal District) (Legislative Assembly) (Chief Minister)	04 April 1973	17 Match; 1974	347 days	Indian National Congress	Vasantrao III	Vasantrao Naik
10		Pratibha Patil (MLA for Jalgaon City Constituency No. 13- Jalgaon District) (Legislative Assembly)	17 Match; 1974	21 February 1975	341 days	Indian National Congress	Vasantrao III	Vasantrao Naik
11		Vasantdada Patil (MLC for Elected by MLAs Constituency No. 20 - Sangli District) (Legislative Council)	21 February 1975	16 April 1977	2 years, 54 days	Indian National Congress	Shankarrao I	Shankarrao Chavan
12		Nashikrao Tirpude (MLA for Bhandara Constituency No. 61- Bhandara District) (Legislative Assembly)	17 April 1977	07 March 1978	1 year, 324 days	Indian National Congress	Vasantdada I	Vasantdada Patil
13		Shivajirao Patil Nilangekar (MLA for Nilanga Constituency No. 238- Latur District) (Legislative Assembly)	07 March 1978	18 July 1978	133 days	Indian National Congress	Vasantdada II	Vasantdada Patil
14		Arjunrao Kasture (MLA for Buldana Constituency No. 23- Buldana District) (Legislative Assembly)	18 July 1978	19 November 1979	1 year, 124 days	Indian Congress (Socialist)	Pawar I	Sharad Pawar
15		Pramila Tople (MLA for Akola Constituency No. 15- Akola District (Legislative Assembly)	19 November 1979	18 February 1980	91 days	Indian Congress (Socialist)	Pawar I	Sharad Pawar
16		Abdul Rahman Antulay (MLA for Shrivardhan Constituency No. 193- Raigad District) (Legislative Assembly) (Chief Minister)	09 June 1980	21 January 1982	1 year, 226 days	Indian National Congress	Antulay	Abdul Rahman Antulay
17		Babasaheb Bhosale (MLA for Nehrunagar Constituency No. 172- Mumbai Suburban District) (Legislative Assembly) (Chief Minister)	21 January 1982	02 February 1983	1 year, 12 days	Indian National Congress	Bhosale	Babasaheb Bhosale
18		Vasantdada Patil (MLA for Sangli Constituency No. 282- Sangli District) (Legislative Assembly) (Chief Minister)	07 February 1983	05 March 1985	2 years, 26 days	Indian National Congress	Vasantdada III	Vasantdada Patil
19		Vasantdada Patil (MLA for Sangli Constituency No. 282- Sangli District) (Legislative Assembly) (Chief Minister)	12 March 1985	03 June 1985	83 days	Indian National Congress	Vasantdada IV	Vasantdada Patil
20		Shivajirao Patil Nilangekar (MLA for Nilanga Constituency No. 238- Latur District) (Legislative Assembly) (Chief Minister)	03 June 1985	12 March 1986	282 days	Indian National Congress	Nilangekar	Shivajirao Patil Nilangekar
21		Shankarrao Chavan (MLC for Elected by MLAs Constituency No. 08 - Nanded District) (Legislative Council) (Chief Minister)	12 March 1986	26 June 1988	2 years, 106 days	Indian National Congress	Shankarrao II	Shankarrao Chavan
22		Sharad Pawar (MLA for Baramati Constituency No. 201- Pune District) (Legislative Assembly) (Chief Minister)	26 June 1988	03 March 1990	1 year, 250 days	Indian National Congress	Pawar II	Sharad Pawar
23		Sharad Pawar (MLA for Baramati Constituency No. 201- Pune District) (Legislative Assembly) (Chief Minister)	03 March 1990	25 June 1991	1 year, 114 days	Indian National Congress	Pawar III	Sharad Pawar
24		Sudhakarrao Naik (MLA for Pusad Constituency No. 81- Yavatmal District) (Legislative Assembly) (Chief Minister)	25 June 1991	22 February 1993	1 year, 242 days	Indian National Congress	Sudhakarrao	Sudhakarrao Naik
25		Harshvardhan Deshmukh (MLA for Morshi Constituency No. 43- Amravati District) (Legislative Assembly)	06 March 1993	18 November 1994	1 year, 257 days	Independent Supported Party (Indian National Congress)	Pawar IV	Sharad Pawar
26		Anna Dange (MLC for Elected by MLAs Constituency No. 05 - Sangli District) (Legislative Council)	14 March 1995	01 February 1999	3 years, 324 days	Bharatiya Janata Party	Joshi	Manohar Joshi
27		Jaiprakash Mundada (MLA for Basmath Constituency No. 92- Hingoli District (Legislative Assembly)	01 February 1999	11 May 1999	99 days	Shiv Sena	Rane	Narayan Rane
28		Radhakrishna Vikhe Patil (MLA for Shirdi Constituency No. 218- Ahmednagar District) (Legislative Assembly)	11 May 1999	17 October 1999	159 days	Shiv Sena	Rane	Narayan Rane
29		Chhagan Bhujbal (MLC for Elected by MLAs Constituency No. 09 - Mumbai City District) (Legislative Council) (Deputy Chief Minister)	19 October 1999	27 October 1999	8 days	Nationalist Congress Party	Deshmukh I	Vilasrao Deshmukh
30		R. R. Patil (MLA for Tasgaon-Kavathe Mahankal Constituency No. 287- Sangli District) (Legislative Assembly)	27 October 1999	16 January 2003	3 years, 81 days	Nationalist Congress Party	Deshmukh I	Vilasrao Deshmukh
31		Ashok Chavan (MLA for Mudkhed Constituency No. 85- Nanded District) (Legislative Assembly)	18 January 2003	01 November 2004	1 year, 295 days	Nationalist Congress Party	Sushilkumar	Sushilkumar Shinde
32		R. R. Patil (MLA for Tasgaon-Kavathe Mahankal Constituency No. 287- Sangli District) (Legislative Assembly) (Deputy Chief Minister)	01 November 2004	09 November 2004	8 days	Nationalist Congress Party	Deshmukh II	Vilasrao Deshmukh
33		Ajit Pawar (MLA for Baramati Constituency No. 201- Pune District) (Legislative Assembly)	09 November 2004	01 December 2008	4 years, 22 days	Nationalist Congress Party	Deshmukh II	Vilasrao Deshmukh
34		Ajit Pawar (MLA for Baramati Constituency No. 201- Pune District) (Legislative Assembly)	08 December 2008	06 November 2009	333 days	Nationalist Congress Party	Ashok I	Ashok Chavan
35		Laxmanrao Dhobale (MLA for Mohol Constituency No. 247- Solapur District) (Legislative Assembly)	07 November 2009	10 November 2010	1 year, 3 days	Nationalist Congress Party	Ashok II	Ashok Chavan
36		Laxmanrao Dhobale (MLA for Mohol Constituency No. 247- Solapur District) (Legislative Assembly)	11 November 2010	07 June 2013	2 years, 208 days	Nationalist Congress Party	Prithviraj	Prithviraj Chavan
37		Chhagan Bhujbal (MLA for Yevla Constituency No. 119- Nashik District) (Legislative Assembly); Additional Charge	07 June 2013	11 June 2013	4 days	Nationalist Congress Party	Prithviraj	Prithviraj Chavan
38		Dilip Gangadhar Sopal (MLA for Barshi Constituency No. 246- Osmanabad District) (Legislative Assembly)	11 June 2013	26 September 2014	1 year, 107 days	Nationalist Congress Party	Prithviraj	Prithviraj Chavan
39		Devendra Fadnavis (MLA for Nagpur South West Constituency No. 52- Nagpur District) (Legislative Assembly) (Chief_Minister)	31 October 2014	04 December 2014	34 days	Bharatiya Janata Party	Fadnavis I	Devendra Fadnavis
40		Babanrao Lonikar (MLA for Partur Constituency No. 99- Parbhani District) (Legislative Assembly)	05 December 2014	12 November 2019	4 years, 342 days	Bharatiya Janata Party	Fadnavis I	Devendra Fadnavis
41		Devendra Fadnavis (MLA for Nagpur South West Constituency No. 52- Nagpur District) (Legislative Assembly) (Chief_Minister); In Charge	23 November 2019	28 November 2019	5 days	Bharatiya Janata Party	Fadnavis II	Devendra Fadnavis
42		Eknath Shinde (MLA for Kopri-Pachpakhadi Constituency No. 147- Thane District) (Legislative Assembly)	28 November 2019	30 December 2019	32 days	Shiv Sena	Thackeray	Uddhav Thackeray
43		Gulab Raghunath Patil (MLA for Jalgaon Rural Constituency No. 14- Jalgaon District (Legislative Assembly)	30 December 2019	27 June 2022	2 years, 179 days	Shiv Sena	Thackeray	Uddhav Thackeray
44		Anil Parab (MLC for Elected by MLAs Constituency No. 07 - Ratnagiri District) (Legislative Council); Additional Charge	27 June 2022	29 June 2022	2 days	Shiv Sena	Thackeray	Uddhav Thackeray
45		Eknath Shinde (MLA for Kopri-Pachpakhadi Constituency No. 147- Thane District) (Legislative Assembly) (Chief Minister); In Charge	30 June 2022	14 August 2022	45 days	Shiv Sena (Shinde Group)	Eknath	Eknath Shinde
46		Gulab Raghunath Patil (MLA for Jalgaon Rural Constituency No. 14- Jalgaon District (Legislative Assembly)	14 August 2022	26 November 2024	2 years, 135 days	Shiv Sena (2022–present)	Eknath	Eknath Shinde
47		Devendra Fadnavis (MLA for Nagpur South West Constituency No. 52- Nagpur District) (Legislative Assembly) (Chief_Minister); In Charge	05 December 2024	21 December 2024	16 days	Bharatiya Janata Party	Fadnavis III	Devendra Fadnavis
48		Gulab Raghunath Patil (MLA for Jalgaon Rural Constituency No. 14- Jalgaon District (Legislative Assembly)	21 December 2024	Incumbent	1 year, 261 days	Shiv Sena (2022–present)	Fadnavis III	Devendra Fadnavis

== Ministers of State ==
Deputy ministers assist cabinet ministers.

Ministers of State
No.	Portrait	Deputy Minister (Constituency)	Term of office			Political party	Ministry	Minister	Chief Minister
No.	Portrait	Deputy Minister (Constituency)	From	To	Period	Political party	Ministry	Minister	Chief Minister
Deputy Minister of Water Supply
The Post of Deputy Minister / Minister of States has been kept Vacant from 23 November 2019 To 28 November 2019			23 November 2019	28 November 2019	5 days	NA	Fadnavis II	Devendra Fadnavis	Devendra Fadnavis
01		Sanjay Bansode (MLA for Udgir Constituency No. 237 - Latur District) (Legislative Assembly)	30 December 2019	29 June 2022	2 years, 181 days	Nationalist Congress Party	Thackeray	Gulab Raghunath Patil	Uddhav Thackeray
The Post of Deputy Minister / Minister of States has been kept Vacant from 30 June 2022			30 June 2022	26 November 2024	2 years, 149 days	NA	Eknath	Eknath Shinde (2022 - 2022); Gulab Raghunath Patil (2022 – 2024)	Eknath Shinde
02		Meghana Bordikar (MLA for Jintur Constituency No. 95- Parbhani District) (Legislative Assembly)	21 December 2024	incumbent	1 year, 261 days	Bharatiya Janata Party	Fadnavis III	Gulab Raghunath Patil (2024 – Present)	Devendra Fadnavis

== Maharashtra Jeevan Pradhikaran ==
Maharashtra Water Supply and Sewerage Board (MWSSB) came into existence in 1976 as per MWSSB Act 1976. It was renamed as Maharashtra Jeevan Pradhikaran (MJP) in 1997. MJP is responsible for providing water supply scheme to each and every town of Maharashtra excluding Mumbai.

=== Maharashtra Environmental Engineering Training and Research Academy (MEETRA) ===
Nashik Research and Training Centre (NRTC) was renamed as Maharashtra Environmental Engineering Training and Research Academy (MEETRA). Institute was established in 1984 with the help of World Bank. MEETRA is an autonomous institute of Maharashtra Jeevan Pradhikaran.
Board of Governance looks after MEETRA. Composition of Board :

- Principal Secretary, Water Supply and Sanitation Department (WSSD), GoM and
- Executive Council headed by Member Secretary, Maharashtra Jeevan Pradhikaran (MJP)
- Management staff under Director of Administration
- Superintending Engineer

== Groundwater Surveys and Development Agency (GSDA) ==
GSDA was established in 1972 as a result of agreement between International Development Association and Government of Maharashtra.
