= Gulab Raghunath Patil =

Indian politician

Cabinet Minister Government of Maharashtra
- Incumbent
- Assumed office 15 December 2024
- Minister: Water Supply; Sanitation
- Governor: C. P. Radhakrishnan; Acharya Devvrat additional charge
- Cabinet: Third Fadnavis ministry
- Chief Minister: Devendra Fadnavis
- Deputy CM: Eknath Shinde; Ajit Pawar (till his demise in 2026) Sunetra Pawar (from 2026)
- Guardian Minister: Jalgaon District
- Preceded by: Himself

Cabinet Minister Government of Maharashtra
- In office 14 August 2022 – 26 November 2024
- Minister: Water Supply; Sanitation
- Governor: Bhagat Singh Koshyari; Ramesh Bais; C. P. Radhakrishnan
- Chief Minister: Eknath Shinde
- Deputy CM: Devendra Fadnavis; Ajit Pawar
- Guardian Minister: Jalgaon District
- Preceded by: Anil Parab; Additional charge (Water Supply): Anil Parab; Additional charge (Sanitation): Rajendra Shingne (Buldhana District); Aaditya Thackeray; Additional charge (Jalgaon District)

Cabinet Minister Government of Maharashtra
- In office 30 December 2019 – 27 June 2022
- Minister: Water Supply; Sanitation
- Governor: Bhagat Singh Koshyari
- Chief Minister: Uddhav Thackeray
- Deputy CM: Ajit Pawar
- Guardian Minister: Jalgaon District
- Preceded by: Babanrao Lonikar (Water Supply Ministry); Babanrao Lonikar (Sanitation Ministry); Girish Mahajan (Jalgaon District)
- Succeeded by: Anil Parab; Additional charge (Water Supply Ministry): Anil Parab; Additional charge (Sanitation Ministry): Aaditya Thackeray; Additional charge (Jalgaon District)

Minister of State Government of Maharashtra
- In office 7 June 2016 – 8 November 2019
- Minister: Co-operation Ministry
- Governor: C. Vidyasagar Rao; Bhagat Singh Koshyari
- Chief Minister: Devendra Fadnavis
- Guardian Minister: Parbhani District
- Succeeded by: Vishwajeet Kadam

Member of Maharashtra Legislative Assembly
- Incumbent
- Assumed office 2014
- Preceded by: Gulabrao Deokar
- Constituency: Jalgaon Rural
- In office 1999–2009
- Preceded by: Mahendrasinh Dharamsinh Patil
- Succeeded by: Chimanrao Patil
- Constituency: Erandol

Personal details
- Born: 5 June 1966 (age 60) At.Paldhi BK., Tq. Dharangaon, Jalgaon district
- Party: Shiv Sena (2022-present)
- Other political affiliations: Balasahebanchi Shiv Sena (2022-2023)
- Spouse: Mayabai Patil
- Children: 3

Gulab Raghunath Patil (born 5 June 1966) is a politician and incumbent Water supply and Sanitation minister of Maharashtra state. He is a Member of Legislative Assembly (MLA), the state's lower house representing rural Jalgaon constituency. He is a member of the Shiv Sena (2022-present) party.

In 2019 he got elected to the 14th legislative assembly. On 30 December 2019, he got appointed Minister of Water supply and Sanitation in Eknath Shinde's cabinet and also served as Guardian Minister of Jalgaon district. From 1999 to 2004 he represented Erandol constituency.

In 2022 Gulab Patil resigned from the minister's post of Uddhav Thackeray's cabinet, left Shiv Sena and joined rebel leader Eknath Shinde during a political crisis. Shinde with more than 40 MLAs demanded a break of alliance from the Nationalist Congress Party–Indian National Congress and demanded Uddhav Thackeray form a government with the Bharatiya Janata Party (BJP). It caused a split in the party, with Shinde forming the government with the latter. Shinde became CM and Patil was appointed minister of Water supply and sanitation. In 2023 the faction took over Shiva Sena by the decision of Election Commission of India (ECI).

== Positions held ==
- 1999: Elected to Maharashtra Legislative Assembly
- 2004: Re-elected to Maharashtra Legislative Assembly
- 2009: Deputy Leader, Shiv Sena
- 2014: Re-elected to Maharashtra Legislative Assembly (3rd term)
- 2015: Aashwasan Samiti Pramukh Maharashtra Vidhan Mandal
- 2016 - 2019: Minister of State for Co-operation in Maharashtra State Government
- 2016 - 2019: Guardian minister of Parbhani (Maharashtra State)
- 2019: Re-elected to Maharashtra Legislative Assembly (4th term)
- 2019: Cabinet Minister of Water Supply & Sanitation in Maharashtra State Government.
- 2020: Appointed guardian minister of Jalgaon district
- 2024: Re-elected to Maharashtra Legislative Assembly (5th term)

== See also ==
- Uddhav Thackeray ministry
- Devendra Fadnavis ministry
- Jalgaon Lok Sabha constituency
