= First Fadnavis ministry =

Council of Ministers headed by Devendra Fadnavis

- 29th Ministry of Maharashtra
- 2014–2019
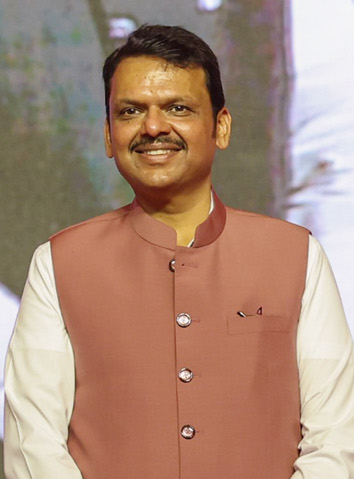
- Devendra Fadnavis; Hon'ble Chief Minister of Maharashtra
- Date formed: 31 October 2014
- Date dissolved: 12 November 2019

People and organisations
- Governor: C. Vidyasagar Rao
- Chief Minister: Devendra Fadnavis
- No. of ministers: 43
- Total no. of members: 43
- Member parties: Bharatiya Janata Party; Shiv Sena; Rashtriya Samaj Paksha; Republican Party of India (A)
- Status in legislature: Government; NDA (186): BJP (122); SHS (63); RSP (1)
- Opposition party: Indian National Congress; Nationalist Congress Party
- Opposition leader: Vijay Wadettiwar (Assembly); Dhananjay Munde (Council)

History
- Election: 2014
- Outgoing election: 2019
- Legislature term: 5 years
- Predecessor: Prithviraj Chavan ministry
- Successor: Second Fadnavis ministry

Devendra Fadnavis the leader of Bharatiya Janata Party was sworn in the Chief Minister of Maharashtra in October 2014. Here is the list of the ministers of his ministry.

Shiv Sena joined the Maharashtra government on 5 December 2014.

== Cabinet Ministers ==
| Portfolio | Minister | Took office | Left office | Party |
|---|---|---|---|---|
| Chief Minister; Home Affairs; General Administration; Law & Judiciary; Urban Development; Ports Development; Information & Public Relations; Other departments not allocated to any Minister | Devendra Fadnavis | 31 October 2014 | 12 November 2019 | BJP |
| Minister of Revenue | Eknath Khadse | 31 October 2014 | 4 June 2016 | BJP |
| Minister of Revenue | Chandrakant Patil | 8 July 2016 | 12 November 2019 | BJP |
| Minister of Agriculture | Eknath Khadse | 31 October 2014 | 4 June 2016 | BJP |
| Minister of Agriculture | Pandurang Fundkar | 8 July 2016 | 31 May 2018 | BJP |
| Minister of Agriculture | Chandrakant Patil | 1 June 2018 | 16 June 2019 | BJP |
| Minister of Agriculture | Anil Bonde | 16 June 2019 | 12 November 2019 | BJP |
| Minister of Excise | Eknath Khadse | 31 October 2014 | 4 June 2016 | BJP |
| Minister of Excise | Chandrashekhar Bawankule | 8 July 2016 | 12 November 2019 | BJP |
| Minister of Animal Husbandry, Fisheries & Dairying | Eknath Khadse | 31 October 2014 | 4 June 2016 | BJP |
| Minister of Animal Husbandry, Fisheries & Dairying | Mahadev Jankar | 8 July 2016 | 12 November 2019 | RSPS |
| Minister of Minority Development & Wakf | Eknath Khadse | 31 October 2014 | 4 June 2016 | BJP |
| Minister of Minority Development & Wakf | Vinod Tawde | 8 July 2016 | 12 November 2019 | BJP |
| Minister of Finance & Planning; Minister of Forest | Sudhir Mungantiwar | 31 October 2014 | 12 November 2019 | BJP |
| Minister of Higher & Technical Education; Minister of Cultural Affairs & Marathi language | Vinod Tawde | 31 October 2014 | 12 November 2019 | BJP |
| Minister of Medical Education | Vinod Tawde | 31 October 2014 | 8 July 2016 | BJP |
| Minister of Medical Education | Girish Mahajan | 8 July 2016 | 12 November 2019 | BJP |
| Minister of School Education; Minister of Sports & Youth Welfare | Vinod Tawde | 31 October 2014 | 16 June 2019 | BJP |
| Minister of School Education; Minister of Sports & Youth Welfare | Ashish Shelar | 16 June 2019 | 12 November 2019 | BJP |
| Minister of Housing | Prakash Mehta | 31 October 2014 | 16 June 2019 | BJP |
| Minister of Housing | Radhakrishna Vikhe Patil | 16 June 2019 | 12 November 2019 | BJP |
| Minister of Labour | Prakash Mehta | 31 October 2014 | 8 July 2016 | BJP |
| Minister of Labour | Sambhaji Patil Nilangekar | 8 July 2016 | 16 June 2019 | BJP |
| Minister of Labour | Sanjay Kute | 8 July 2016 | 16 June 2019 | BJP |
| Minister of Parliamentary Affairs | Prakash Mehta | 31 October 2014 | 4 December 2014 | BJP |
| Minister of Parliamentary Affairs | Girish Bapat | 4 December 2014 | 4 June 2019 | BJP |
| Minister of Parliamentary Affairs | Vinod Tawde | 7 June 2019 | 12 November 2019 | BJP |
| Minister of Public Works (excluding Public Undertakings) | Chandrakant Patil | 31 October 2014 | 12 November 2019 | BJP |
| Minister of Co-operation | Chandrakant Patil | 31 October 2014 | 8 July 2016 | BJP |
| Minister of Co-operation | Subhash Deshmukh | 8 July 2016 | 12 November 2019 | BJP |
| Minister of Marketing; Minister of Textiles | Chandrakant Patil | 31 October 2014 | 8 July 2016 | BJP |
| Minister of Marketing; Minister of Textiles | Subhash Deshmukh | 8 July 2016 | 16 June 2019 | BJP |
| Minister of Marketing; Minister of Textiles | Ram Shinde | 16 June 2019 | 12 November 2019 | BJP |
| Minister of Rural Development; Minister of Women & Child Development | Pankaja Munde | 31 October 2014 | 12 November 2019 | BJP |
| Minister of Soil & Water Conservation | Pankaja Munde | 31 October 2014 | 8 July 2016 | BJP |
| Minister of Soil & Water Conservation | Ram Shinde | 8 July 2016 | 16 June 2019 | BJP |
| Minister of Soil & Water Conservation | Tanaji Sawant | 16 June 2019 | 12 November 2019 | SS |
| Minister of Tribal Development | Vishnu Savara | 31 October 2014 | 16 June 2019 | BJP |
| Minister of Tribal Development | Ashok Uike | 16 June 2019 | 12 November 2019 | BJP |
| Minister of Social Justice & Special Assistance | Vishnu Savara | 31 October 2014 | 4 December 2014 | BJP |
| Minister of Social Justice & Special Assistance | Rajkumar Badole | 4 December 2014 | 16 June 2019 | BJP |
| Minister of Social Justice & Special Assistance | Suresh Khade | 16 June 2019 | 12 November 2019 | BJP |
| Minister of Public Works (including Public Undertakings) | Eknath Shinde | 4 December 2014 | 12 November 2019 | SS |
| Minister of Industries; Minister of Mining | Subhash Desai | 4 December 2014 | 12 November 2019 | SS |
| Minister of Environment & Climate Change | Ramdas Kadam | 4 December 2014 | 12 November 2019 | SS |
| Minister of Transport | Diwakar Raote | 4 December 2014 | 12 November 2019 | SS |
| Minister of Public Health | Deepak Sawant | 4 December 2014 | 7 January 2019 | SS |
| Minister of Public Health | Eknath Shinde | 7 January 2019 | 12 November 2019 | SS |
| Minister of Food, Civil Supplies & Consumer Protection | Girish Bapat | 4 December 2014 | 4 June 2019 | BJP |
| Minister of Food, Civil Supplies & Consumer Protection | Sambhaji Patil Nilangekar | 16 June 2019 | 12 November 2019 | BJP |
| Minister of Food & Drug Administration | Girish Bapat | 4 December 2014 | 4 June 2019 | BJP |
| Minister of Food & Drug Administration | Jaykumar Rawal | 16 June 2019 | 12 November 2019 | BJP |
| Minister of Water Resources | Girish Mahajan | 4 December 2014 | 12 November 2019 | BJP |
| Minister of Energy | Chandrashekhar Bawankule | 4 December 2014 | 12 November 2019 | BJP |
| Minister of Water Supply & Sanitation | Babanrao Lonikar | 4 December 2014 | 12 November 2019 | BJP |
| Minister of Tourism | Jaykumar Rawal | 8 July 2016 | 12 November 2019 | BJP |
| Minister of Employment Guarantee | Jaykumar Rawal | 8 July 2016 | 16 June 2019 | BJP |
| Minister of Employment Guarantee | Jaydattaji Kshirsagar | 16 June 2019 | 12 November 2019 | SS |
| Minister of Horticulture | Pandurang Fundkar | 8 July 2016 | 31 May 2018 | BJP |
| Minister of Horticulture | Jaydattaji Kshirsagar | 16 June 2019 | 12 November 2019 | SS |

== Ministers of State ==
| # | Name | Constituency | Department | Party |
|---|---|---|---|---|
| 1. | Avinash Mahatekar | n/a | Minister of State for Social Justice and Special Assistance | RPI(A) |
| 2. | Bala Bhegade | Maval | Minister of State for Labour, Environment, Relief and Rehabilitation, Earthquake Rehabilitation | BJP |
| 3. | Vidya Thakur | Goregaon | Minister of State for Women and Child Development | BJP |
| 4. | Vijay Deshmukh | Solapur City North | Minister of State for Public Health, Transport, State Excise | BJP |
| 5. | Sanjay Rathod | Digras | Minister of State for Revenue | SHS |
| 6. | Dadaji Bhuse | Malegaon Outer | Minister of State for Rural Development | SHS |
| 7. | Vijay Shivtare | Purandar | Minister of State for Water Resources, Water Conservation, Parliamentary Affairs | SHS |
| 8. | Deepak Kesarkar | Sawantwadi | Minister of State for Home (Rural), Finance and Planning | SHS |
| 9. | Ravindra Waikar | Jogeshwari East | Minister of State for Housing, Higher and Technical Education | SHS |
| 10. | Ranjit Patil | MLC | Minister of State for Home (Urban), Law and Judiciary, Parliamentary Affairs, Skill Development and Entrepreneurship, Ex-Servicemen Welfare | BJP |
| 11. | Yogesh Sagar | Charkop | Minister of State for Urban Development | BJP |
| 12. | Parinay Fuke | MLC | Minister of State for Public Works (excluding Public Undertakings), Forests, Tribal Development | BJP |
| 13. | Atul Save | Aurangabad East | Minister of State for Industries and Mining, Minorities Development and Wakf | BJP |
| 14. | Gulabrao Patil | Jalgaon Rural | Minister of State for Co-operation | SHS |
| 15. | Arjun Khotkar | Jalna | Minister of State for Textiles, Animal Husbandry, Dairy Development, and Fisheries Development | SHS |
| 16. | Madan Yerawar | Yavatmal | Minister of State for Energy, Tourism, Food, and Drugs Administration, Public Works (Public Undertakings), General Administration | BJP |
| 17. | Sadabhau Khot | MLC | Minister of State for Agriculture and Horticulture, Marketing, Water Supply, and Sanitation | BJP |
| 18. | Ravindra Chavan | Dombivali | Minister of State for Ports, Medical Education, Information and Technology, Food and Civil Supplies and Consumer Protectionon | BJP |

== Former ministers ==
| SI No. | Name | Constituency | Department | Tenure | Party |
|---|---|---|---|---|---|
| 1 | Dilip Kamble | Pune Cantonment | Minister of State for Social Justice and Special Assistance | 31 October 2014 – 4 June 2019 | BJP |
| 2 | Raje Ambrishrao Raje Satyawan Rao Atram | Aheri | Minister of State for Tribal Development & Forests. | 5 December 2014 – 4 June 2019 | BJP |
| 3 | Pravin Pote | MLC | Minister of State for Industries and Mining, Environment, Public Works (excluding public undertaking). | 5 December 2014 – 4 June 2019 | BJP |

== Ministers by Party ==
Representation of cabinet ministers by party
1. Bharatiya Janata Party (65.0%)
2. Shivsena (30.0%)
3. Rashtriya Samaj Paksha (2.50%)
4. Republican Party of India (Athawale) (2.50%)

| Party | Cabinet Ministers | Minister of State | Total No.of Ministers |
|---|---|---|---|
| Bharatiya Janata Party | 18 | 10 | 28 |
| Shiv Sena | 6 | 7 | 13 |
| Rashtriya Samaj Paksha | 1 | - | 1 |
| Republican Party of India (Athawale) | - | 1 | 1 |

== Guardian Ministers ==
| Portfolio | Minister | Took office | Left office | Party |
|---|---|---|---|---|
| Mumbai (City) | Subash Desai | 31 October 2014 | 4 November 2019 | SS |
| Mumbai (Suburbs) | Vinod Tawde | 31 October 2014 | 4 November 2019 | BJP |
| Parbhani; Nanded | Diwakar Raote | 31 October 2014 | 4 November 2019 | SS |
| Osmanabad; Bhandara | Deepak Sawant | 31 October 2014 | 4 November 2019 | SS |
| Jalgaon; Buldhana | Eknath Khadse | 31 October 2014 | 4 November 2019 | BJP |
| Sangli; Kolhapur | Chandrakant Patil | 31 October 2014 | 4 November 2019 | BJP |
| Wardha; Chandrapur | Sudhir Mungantiwar | 31 October 2014 | 4 November 2019 | BJP |
| Latur; Beed | Pankaja Munde | 31 October 2014 | 4 November 2019 | BJP |
| Thane | Eknath Shinde | 31 October 2014 | 4 November 2019 | SS |
| Palghar | Vishnu Sawra | 31 October 2014 | 4 November 2019 | BJP |
| Raigad | Prakash Mehta | 31 October 2014 | 4 November 2019 | BJP |
| Ratnagiri | Ravindra Waikar | 31 October 2014 | 4 November 2019 | SS |
| Sindhudurg | Deepak Kesarkar | 31 October 2014 | 4 November 2019 | SS |
| Ahmednagar | Ram Shinde | 31 October 2014 | 4 November 2019 | BJP |
| Nashik; Nandurbar | Girish Bapat | 31 October 2014 | 4 November 2019 | BJP |
| Pune | Girish Bapat | 31 October 2014 | 4 November 2019 | BJP |
| Satara | Vijay Shivtare | 31 October 2014 | 4 November 2019 | SS |
| Solapur | Vijay Deshmukh | 31 October 2014 | 4 November 2019 | BJP |
| Amravati | Pravin Mote | 31 October 2014 | 4 November 2019 | SS |
| Akola | Ranjit Patil | 31 October 2014 | 4 November 2019 | BJP |
| Yavatmal | Sanjay Rathod | 31 October 2014 | 4 November 2019 | SS |
| Nagpur | Chandrashekhar Bawankule | 31 October 2014 | 4 November 2019 | BJP |
| Gadchiroli | Raje Ambrishrao Raje Satyawan Rao Atram | 31 October 2014 | 4 November 2019 | BJP |
| Gondia | Rajkumar Badole | 31 October 2014 | 4 November 2019 | BJP |
| Aurangabad | Ramdas Kadam | 31 October 2014 | 4 November 2019 | SS |
| Jalna | Babanrao Lonikar | 31 October 2014 | 4 November 2019 | BJP |
| Hingoli | Dilip Kamble | 31 October 2014 | 4 November | BJP |

== Ministers Region-wise ==
| Region | | |
| Region | Bharatiya Janata Party | Shiv Sena |
|---|---|---|
| MLC | 03 | 05 |
| Western Maharashtra | 06 | 01 |
| Vidarbha | 09 | 01 |
| Marathwada | 03 | 02 |
| Thane+Konkan | 01 | 02 |
| Mumbai | 03 | 01 |
| North Maharashtra | 03 | 01 |
| Total | 28 | 13 |

== District wise breakup ==
| District | Ministers | Name | Party | Designation |
|---|---|---|---|---|
| Ahmednagar | 1 | Ram Shinde | Bharatiya Janata Party | Cabinet Minister |
| Akola | 0 | - | | |
| Amaravati | 1 | Anil Sukhdevrao Bonde | Bharatiya Janata Party | Cabinet Minister |
| Aurangabad | 1 | Atul Moreshwar Save | Bharatiya Janata Party | Minister of State |
| Beed | 2 | Pankaja Munde | Bharatiya Janata Party | Cabinet Minister |
| Beed | 2 | Jaydattaji Kshirsagar | Shiv Sena | Cabinet Minister |
| Bhandara | 0 | - | | |
| Buldhana | 2 | Sanjay Shriram Kute | Bharatiya Janata Party | Cabinet Minister |
| Buldhana | 2 | Pandurang Pundalik Fundkar | Bharatiya Janata Party | Cabinet Minister |
| Chandrapur | 1 | Sudhir Mungantiwar | Bharatiya Janata Party | Cabinet Minister |
| Dhule | 1 | Jayakumar Jitendrasinh Rawal | Bharatiya Janata Party | Cabinet Minister |
| Gadchiroli | 0 | - | | |
| Gondiya | 1 | Rajkumar Badole | Bharatiya Janata Party | Cabinet Minister |
| Hingoli | 0 | - | | |
| Jalgaon | 3 | Gulabrao Raghunath Patil | Shiv Sena | Minister of State |
| Jalgaon | 3 | Girish Mahajan | Bharatiya Janata Party | Cabinet Minister |
| Jalgaon | 3 | Eknath Khadse | Bharatiya Janata Party | Cabinet Minister |
| Jalna | 2 | Arjun Khotkar | Shiv Sena | Minister of State |
| Jalna | 2 | Babanrao Lonikar | Bharatiya Janata Party | Cabinet Minister |
| Kolhapur | 0 | - | | |
| Latur | 1 | Sambhaji Patil Nilangekar | Bharatiya Janata Party | Cabinet Minister |
| Mumbai City | 0 | - | | |
| Mumbai Suburban | 3 | Vinod Tawde | Bharatiya Janata Party | Cabinet Minister |
| Mumbai Suburban | 3 | Ravindra Waikar | Shiv Sena | Minister of State |
| Mumbai Suburban | 3 | Vidya Thakur | Bharatiya Janata Party | Minister of State |
| Mumbai Suburban | 3 | Ashish Shelar | Bharatiya Janata Party | Cabinet Minister |
| Nagpur | 2 | Devendra Fadnavis | Bharatiya Janata Party | Chief Minister |
| Nagpur | 2 | Chandrashekhar Bawankule | Bharatiya Janata Party | Cabinet Minister |
| Nanded | 0 | - | | |
| Nandurbar | 0 | - | | |
| Nashik | 0 | - | | |
| Osmanabad | 0 | - | | |
| Palghar | 1 | Vishnu Savara | Bharatiya Janata Party | Cabinet Minister |
| Parbhani | 0 | - | | |
| Pune | 3 | Girish Bapat | Bharatiya Janata Party | Cabinet Minister |
| Pune | 3 | Vijay Shivtare | Shiv Sena | Minister of State |
| Pune | 3 | Bala Bhegade | Bharatiya Janata Party | Minister of State |
| Raigad | 0 | - | | |
| Ratnagiri | 0 | - | | |
| Sangli | 1 | Suresh Khade | Bharatiya Janata Party | Cabinet Minister |
| Satara | 0 | - | | |
| Sindhudurg | 1 | Deepak Kesarkar | Shiv Sena | Minister of State |
| Solapur | 2 | Subhash Sureshchandra Deshmukh | Bharatiya Janata Party | Cabinet Minister |
| Solapur | 2 | Vijay Deshmukh | Bharatiya Janata Party | Minister of State |
| Thane | 2 | Eknath Shinde | Shiv Sena | Cabinet Minister |
| Thane | 2 | Ravindra Chavan | Bharatiya Janata Party | Minister of State |
| Wardha | 0 | - | | |
| Washim | 0 | - | | |
| Yavatmal | 2 | Madan Madhukarrao Yerawar | Bharatiya Janata Party | Minister of State |
| Yavatmal | 2 | Ashok Uike | Bharatiya Janata Party | Cabinet Minister |
