= Ministry of Parliamentary Affairs (Maharashtra) =

Ministry of Parliamentary Affairs Government of Maharashtra
- मंत्रालय संसदीय कार्य विभाग महाराष्ट्र शासन
- Seal of the state of Maharashtra

- Building of Administrative Headquarters of Mumbai

Agency overview
- Formed: 1960; 66 years ago
- Preceding agency: Department of Parliamentary Affairs
- Jurisdiction: Chief Minister of Maharashtra
- Headquarters: Mantralaya, Mumbai
- Annual budget: State budget of Government of Maharashtra
- Minister responsible: Chandrakant Patil, Cabinet Minister
- Deputy Ministers responsible: Vacant, TBD since 29 June 2022, Minister of State; Vacant, TBD since 29 June 2022, Minister of State
- Agency executives: Shri. Bhupendra M. Gurao, Principal Secretary; -, Joint Secretary; -, Deputy Secretary

Ministry of Parliamentary Affairs Department Maharashtra is a Ministry of Government of Maharashtra.

The Ministry is currently headed by Chandrakant Patil, a Cabinet Minister.

Minister of Parliamentary Affairs मंत्री संसदीय कार्य विभाग
- Emblem of India

- Flag of India

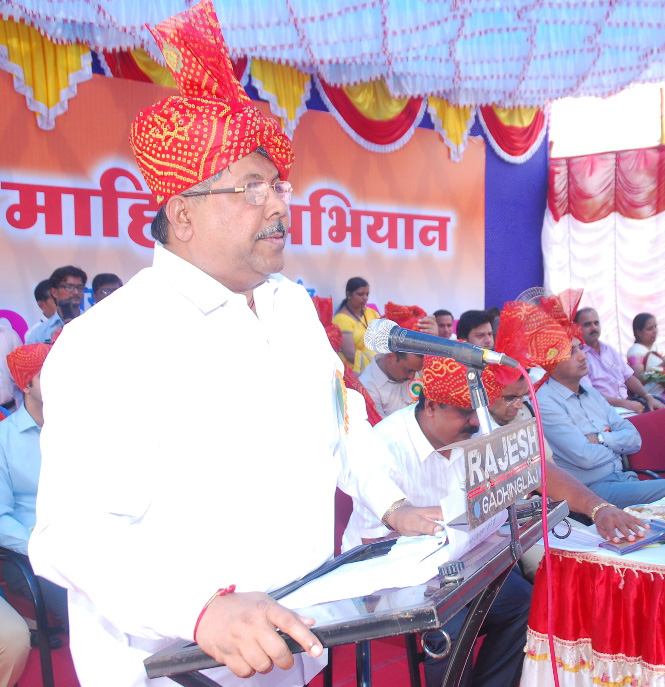
- Incumbent; Chandrakant Patil since 21 December 2024
- Ministry of Parliamentary Affairs (Maharashtra)
- Style: The Honourable
- Abbreviation: Cabinet Minister
- Member of: State Cabinet
- Reports to: Chief Minister, Maharashtra Legislature
- Seat: Mantralaya, Mumbai
- Appointer: Governor on the advice of the Chief Minister
- Term length: 5 years
- Precursor: Devendra Fadnavis (2022 - 2024)
- Inaugural holder: Vasantrao Naik (1960-1962)
- Formation: 1 May 1960
- Deputy: Vacant, TBD; since 29 June 2022: Vacant, TBD; since 29 June 2022

== Cabinet Ministers ==
No.	Portrait	Minister (Constituency)	Term of office			Political party	Ministry	Chief Minister
No.	Portrait	Minister (Constituency)	From	To	Period	Political party	Ministry	Chief Minister
Minister of Parliamentary Affairs
01		S. K. Wankhede (MLA for Kalameshwar Constituency No. 52- Nagpur District (Legislative Assembly)	01 May 1960	07 March 1962	1 year, 310 days	Indian National Congress	Yashwantrao I	Yashwantrao Chavan
02		Vasantrao Naik (MLA for Pusad Constituency No. 81- Yavatmal District) (Legislative Assembly)	08 March 1962	19 November 1962	256 days	Indian National Congress	Yashwantrao II	Yashwantrao Chavan
03		Nirmala Raje Bhosale (MLA for Satara Constituency No. 268- Satara District) (Legislative Assembly)	20 November 1962	24 November 1963	1 year, 4 days	Indian National Congress	Kannamwar l	Marotrao Kannamwar
04		P. K. Sawant (MLA for Chiplun Constituency No. 265- Ratnagiri District) (Legislative Assembly) (Interim Chief Minister)	25 November 1962	04 December 1963	9 days	Indian National Congress	Sawant I	P. K. Sawant
05		P. K. Sawant (MLA for Chiplun Constituency No. 265- Ratnagiri District) (Legislative Assembly)	05 December 1963	01 March 1967	3 years, 86 days	Indian National Congress	Vasantrao I	Vasantrao Naik
06		S. K. Wankhede (MLA for Sawargoan Constituency No. 49- Nagpur District) (Legislative Assembly)	01 March 1967	27 October 1969	2 years, 240 days	Indian National Congress	Vasantrao II	Vasantrao Naik
07		Shankarrao Chavan (MLA for Bhokar Constituency No. 85- Nanded District) (Legislative Assembly)	27 October 1969	13 March 1972	2 years, 138 days	Indian National Congress	Vasantrao II	Vasantrao Naik
08		Abdul Rahman Antulay (MLA for Shrivardhan Constituency No. 193- Raigad District) (Legislative Assembly)	13 March 1972	21 February 1975	2 years, 345 days	Indian National Congress	Vasantrao III	Vasantrao Naik
Minister of Legislative Affairs
09		Narendra Mahipati Tidke (MLA for Savner Constituency No. 49- Nagpur District) (Legislative Assembly)	21 February 1975	17 May 1977	2 years, 85 days	Indian National Congress	Shankarrao I	Shankarrao Chavan
10		Narendra Mahipati Tidke (MLA for Savner Constituency No. 49- Nagpur District) (Legislative Assembly)	17 May 1977	15 August 1977	90 days	Indian National Congress	Vasantdada I	Vasantdada Patil
11		Nashikrao Tirpude (MLA for Bhandara Constituency No. 61- Bhandara District) (Legislative Assembly)	15 August 1977	06 March 1978	203 days	Indian National Congress	Vasantdada I	Vasantdada Patil
12		Shivajirao Patil Nilangekar (MLA for Nilanga Constituency No. 238- Latur District) (Legislative Assembly)	07 March 1978	18 July 1978	133 days	Indian National Congress (U)	Vasantdada II	Vasantdada Patil
13		Govindrao Adik (MLA for Shrirampur Constituency No. 231- Ahmednagar District) (Legislative Assembly)	18 July 1978	17 February 1980	1 year, 214 days	Indian Congress (Socialist)	Pawar I	Sharad Pawar
14		Jayant Shridhar Tilak (MLC for Elected by MLAs Constituency No. 02 - Pune District) (Legislative Council)	09 June 1980	21 January 1982	1 year, 226 days	Indian National Congress	Antulay	Abdul Rahman Antulay
15		Shivajirao Patil Nilangekar (MLA for Nilanga Constituency No. 238- Latur District) (Legislative Assembly)	21 January 1982	02 February 1983	1 year, 12 days	Indian National Congress	Bhosale	Babasaheb Bhosale
16		Shantaram Gholap (MLA for Murbad Constituency No. 139- Thane District) (Legislative Assembly)	07 February 1983	05 March 1985	2 years, 26 days	Indian National Congress	Vasantdada III	Vasantdada Patil
17		Narendra Mahipati Tidke (MLA for Savner Constituency No. 49- Nagpur District) (Legislative Assembly)	12 March 1985; 1960	03 June 1985; 1962	83 days	Indian National Congress	Vasantdada IV	Vasantdada Patil
18		Narendra Mahipati Tidke (MLA for Savner Constituency No. 49- Nagpur District) (Legislative Assembly)	03 June 1985	12 March 1986	282 days	Indian National Congress	Nilangekar	Shivajirao Patil Nilangekar
19		Vilasrao Deshmukh (MLA for Latur City Constituency No. 235- Latur District) (Legislative Assembly)	12 March 1986	26 June 1988	2 years, 106 days	Indian National Congress	Shankarrao II	Shankarrao Chavan
Minister of Parliamentary Affairs
20		Sudhakarrao Naik (MLA for Pusad Constituency No. 81- Yavatmal District) (Legislative Assembly)	26 June 1988	03 March 1990	1 year, 250 days	Indian National Congress	Pawar II	Sharad Pawar
21		Sudhakarrao Naik (MLA for Pusad Constituency No. 81- Yavatmal District) (Legislative Assembly)	04 March 1990	25 June 1991	1 year, 113 days	Indian National Congress	Pawar III	Sharad Pawar
22		Shivajirao Deshmukh (MLC for Elected by MLAs Constituency No. 18 - Sangli District) (Legislative Council)	25 June 1991	03 September 1992	1 year, 70 days	Indian National Congress	Sudhakarrao	Sudhakarrao Naik
23		Vijaysinh Mohite-Patil (MLA for Malshiras Constituency No. 254- Solapur District) (Legislative Assembly)	07 September 1992	22 February 1993	168 days	Indian National Congress	Sudhakarrao	Sudhakarrao Naik
24		Shivajirao Deshmukh (MLC for Elected by MLAs Constituency No. 18 - Sangli District) (Legislative Council)	06 March 1993	14 March 1995	2 years, 8 days	Indian National Congress	Pawar IV	Sharad Pawar
24		Liladhar Dake (MLA for Bhandup Constituency No. 157- Mumbai Suburban District) (Legislative Assembly)	14 March 1995	31 January 1999	3 years, 323 days	Shiv Sena	Joshi	Manohar Joshi
25		Liladhar Dake (MLA for Bhandup Constituency No. 157- Mumbai Suburban District) (Legislative Assembly)	01 February 1999	17 October 1999	258 days	Shiv Sena	Rane	Narayan Rane
26		Surupsingh Hirya Naik (MLA for Navapur Constituency No. 04- Nandurbar District) (Legislative Assembly)	19 October 1999	27 October 1999	8 days	Indian National Congress	Deshmukh I	Vilasrao Deshmukh
27		Rohidas Patil (MLA for Dhule Constituency No. 07- Dhule District (Legislative Assembly)	27 October 1999	16 January 2003	3 years, 81 days	Indian National Congress	Deshmukh I	Vilasrao Deshmukh
28		Patangrao Kadam (MLA for Palus-Kadegaon Constituency No. 285- Sangli District) (Legislative Assembly)	18 January 2003	27 January 2003	16 days	Indian National Congress	Sushilkumar	Sushilkumar Shinde
29		Rohidas Patil (MLA for Dhule Constituency No. 07- Dhule District (Legislative Assembly)	27 January 2003	01 November 2004	278 days	Indian National Congress	Sushilkumar	Sushilkumar Shinde
30		Chandrakant Handore (MLA for Chembur Constituency No. 173- Mumbai Suburban District (Legislative Assembly)	09 November 2004	01 December 2007	4 years, 22 days	Indian National Congress	Nilangekar II	Vilasrao Deshmukh
31		Anees Ahmed (MLA for Nagpur Central Constituency No. 55- Nagpur District (Legislative Assembly)	08 December 2008	06 November 2009	333 days	Indian National Congress	Ashok I	Ashok Chavan
32		Harshvardhan Patil (MLA for Indapur Constituency No. 200- Pune District (Legislative Assembly)	07 November 2009	10 November; 201p	1 year, 3 days	Indian National Congress	Ashok II	Ashok Chavan
33		Harshvardhan Patil (MLA for Indapur Constituency No. 200- Pune District (Legislative Assembly)	11 November 2010	26 September 2014	3 years, 319 days	Indian National Congress	Prithviraj	Prithviraj Chavan
34		Prakash Mehta (MLA for Ghatkopar East Constituency No. 170- Mumbai Suburban District (Legislative Assembly)	31 October 2014	04 December 2014	34 days	Bharatiya Janata Party	Fadnavis I	Devendra Fadnavis
35		Girish Bapat (MLA for Kasba Peth Constituency No. 215- Pune District (Legislative Assembly)	04 December 2014	04 June 2019	4 years, 182 days	Bharatiya Janata Party	Fadnavis I	Devendra Fadnavis
36		Vinod Tawde (MLA for Borivali Constituency No. 152- Mumbai Suburban District (Legislative Assembly)	07 June 2019	12 November 2019	158 days	Bharatiya Janata Party	Fadnavis I	Devendra Fadnavis
37		Devendra Fadnavis (MLA for Nagpur South West Constituency No. 52- Nagpur District) (Legislative Assembly) (Chief Minister) (In Charge )	23 November 2019	28 November 2019	5 days	Bharatiya Janata Party	Fadnavis II	Devendra Fadnavis
38		Eknath Shinde (MLA for Kopri-Pachpakhadi Constituency No. 147- Thane District) (Legislative Assembly)	28 November 2019	30 December 2019	32 days	Shiv Sena	Thackeray	Uddhav Thackeray
39		Anil Parab (MLC for Elected by MLAs Constituency No. 07 - Ratnagiri District) (Legislative Council)	30 December 2019	29 June 2022	2 years, 181 days	Shiv Sena	Thackeray	Uddhav Thackeray
40		Eknath Shinde (MLA for Kopri-Pachpakhadi Constituency No. 147- Thane District) (Legislative Assembly) (Chief Minister) (In Charge )	30 June 2022	14 August 2022	45 days	Shiv Sena (2022–present)	Eknath	Eknath Shinde
41		Chandrakant Patil (MLA for Kothrud Constituency No. 210- Pune District) (Legislative Assembly)	14 August 2022	26 November 2024	2 years, 104 days	Bharatiya Janata Party	Eknath	Eknath Shinde
42		Devendra Fadnavis (MLA for Nagpur South West Constituency No. 52- Nagpur District) (Legislative Assembly) (Chief_Minister); In Charge	05 December 2024	21 December 2024	16 days	Bharatiya Janata Party	Fadnavis III	Devendra Fadnavis
43		Chandrakant Patil (MLA for Kothrud Constituency No. 210- Pune District) (Legislative Assembly)	21 December 2024	Incumbent	1 year, 319 days	Bharatiya Janata Party	Fadnavis III	Devendra Fadnavis

== Ministers of State ==
No.	Portrait	Deputy Minister (Constituency)	Term of office			Political party	Ministry	Minister	Chief Minister
No.	Portrait	Deputy Minister (Constituency)	From	To	Period	Political party	Ministry	Minister	Chief Minister
Deputy Minister of Parliamentary Affairs.
Vacant (Council) & (Assembly)			23 November 2019	28 November 2019	5 days	NA	Fadnavis II	Devendra Fadnavis	Devendra Fadnavis
01 (Council)		Satej Patil (MLC for Elected by Kolhapur Local Authorities Constituency No. 06 - Kolhapur District) (Legislative Council)	30 December 2019	29 June 2022	2 years, 181 days	Indian National Congress	Thackeray	Anil Parab	Uddhav Thackeray
02 (Assembly)		Sanjay Bansode (MLA for Udgir Constituency No. 237- Latur District) (Legislative Assembly)	30 December 2019	29 June 2022	2 years, 181 days	Nationalist Congress Party	Thackeray	Anil Parab	Uddhav Thackeray
Vacant (Council) & (Assembly)			30 June 2022	26 November 2024	2 years, 149 days	NA	Eknath	Eknath Shinde (2022 - 2022); Chandrakant Patil (2022 - 2024)	Eknath Shinde
Vacant (Council) & (Assembly)			21 December 2024	incumbent	1 year, 319 days	NA	Fadnavis III	Chandrakant Patil (2024 – Present)	Devendra Fadnavis
