= Jalgaon Lok Sabha constituency =

Lok Sabha constituency in Maharashtra

Coordinates: 21.0°N 75.6°E

Jalgaon Lok Sabha
- Lok Sabha constituency
- Jalgaon Lok Sabha Constituency map

Constituency details
- Country: India
- Region: Western India
- State: Maharashtra
- Assembly constituencies: Jalgaon City; Jalgaon Rural; Amalner; Erandol; Chalisgaon; Pachora
- Established: 2008
- Total electors: 19,94,046
- Reservation: None

Member of Parliament
- 18th Lok Sabha
- Incumbent Smita Wagh
- Party: BJP
- Elected year: 2024

Jalgaon Lok Sabha constituency is one of the 48 Lok Sabha (parliamentary) constituencies of Maharashtra state in western India.

== Assembly segments ==
At present, (after the implementation of the Presidential notification on delimitation on 19 February 2008), Jalgaon Lok Sabha constituency comprises six Vidhan Sabha (legislative assembly) segments. These segments are:

| # | Name | District | Member | Party | Leading (in 2024) |
|---|---|---|---|---|---|
| 13 | Jalgaon City | Jalgaon | Suresh Bhole | BJP | BJP |
| 14 | Jalgaon Rural | Jalgaon | Gulabrao Patil | SHS | BJP |
| 15 | Amalner | Jalgaon | Anil Bhaidas Patil | NCP | BJP |
| 16 | Erandol | Jalgaon | Amol Patil | SHS | BJP |
| 17 | Chalisgaon | Jalgaon | Mangesh Chavan | BJP | BJP |
| 18 | Pachora | Jalgaon | Kishor Appa Patil | SHS | BJP |

== Members of Parliament ==
| Year | Name | Party |
|---|---|---|
| 1952 | Hari Vinayak Pataskar | Indian National Congress |
| 1952 | Shivram Rango Rane | Indian National Congress |
| 1957 | Naushir Bharucha | Independent |
| 1962 | Julalsing Shankarrao Patil | Indian National Congress |
| 1967 | S. S. Syed | Indian National Congress |
| 1971 | Krishnarao Madhavrao Patil | Indian National Congress |
| 1977 | Yashwant Borole | Janata Party |
| 1980 | Yadav Shivram Mahajan | Indian National Congress |
| 1984 | Yadav Shivram Mahajan | Indian National Congress |
| 1989 | Yadav Shivram Mahajan | Indian National Congress |
| 1991 | Gunwantrao Sarode | Bharatiya Janata Party |
| 1996 | Gunwantrao Sarode | Bharatiya Janata Party |
| 1998 | Dr. Ulhas Vasudeo Patil | Indian National Congress |
| 1999 | Y. G. Mahajan | Bharatiya Janata Party |
| 2004 | Y. G. Mahajan | Bharatiya Janata Party |
| 2007^ | Haribhau Jawale | Bharatiya Janata Party |
| 2009 | A. T. Patil | Bharatiya Janata Party |
| 2014 | A. T. Patil | Bharatiya Janata Party |
| 2019 | Unmesh Bhaiyyasaheb Patil | Bharatiya Janata Party |
| 2024 | Smita Wagh | Bharatiya Janata Party |

^ - bypoll

== Election results ==
=== 2024 ===
2024 Indian general election: Jalgaon
| Party | Candidate | Votes | % | ±% |
|---|---|---|---|---|
| BJP | Smita Wagh | 674,428 | 57.67 | ▼7.93 |
| SS(UBT) | Karan Balasaheb Patil - Pawar | 4,22,834 | 36.15 | New |
| VBA | Yuvraj Jadhav | 21,177 | 1.81 | ▼1.62 |
| NOTA | None of the Above | 13,919 | 1.19 | N/A |
| Majority | | 2,51,594 | 21.51 | ▼16.32 |
| Turnout | | 11,69,553 | 58.65 | ▲2.10 |
| BJP hold | | Swing | | |

=== 2019 ===
2019 Indian general elections: Jalgaon
| Party | Candidate | Votes | % | ±% |
|---|---|---|---|---|
| BJP | Unmesh Bhaiyyasaheb Patil | 713,874 | 65.60 | |
| NCP | Gulabrao Deokar | 3,02,221 | 27.77 | |
| VBA | Anjali Baviskar | 37,366 | 3.43 | |
| NOTA | NOTA | 10,332 | 0.95 | |
| Majority | | 4,11,617 | 37.83 | |
| Turnout | | 10,92,287 | 56.55 | −1.45 |
| BJP hold | | Swing | | |

=== General elections 2014 ===
2014 Indian general elections: Jalgaon
| Party | Candidate | Votes | % | ±% |
|---|---|---|---|---|
| BJP | A T Nana Patil | 6,47,773 | 65.39 | +13.28 |
| NCP | Dr. Satish Bhaskarrao Patil | 2,64,248 | 26.68 | −10.94 |
| BSP | V. T. Bagul | 10,838 | 1.09 | −0.89 |
| AAP | Dr. Sangram Patil | 7,390 | 0.75 | N/A |
| Majority | | 3,83,525 | 38.85 | +24.22 |
| Turnout | | 9,90,604 | 58.00 | |
| BJP hold | | Swing | | |

=== General elections 2009 ===
2009 Indian general elections: Jalgaon
| Party | Candidate | Votes | % | ±% |
|---|---|---|---|---|
| BJP | A T Nana Patil | 3,43,647 | 52.34 | |
| NCP | Vasantrao More | 2,47,627 | 37.71 | |
| Independent | Sudhakar Wagh | 19,206 | 2.92 | |
| BSP | Adv. Matin Ahmed | 12,981 | 1.98 | |
| Majority | | 96,020 | 14.63 | |
| Turnout | | 6,56,567 | 42.38 | |
| BJP hold | | Swing | | |

== See also ==
- Jalgaon district
- Raver Lok Sabha constituency
- List of constituencies of the Lok Sabha
