= Mahendrasinh Dharamsinh Patil =

Former Member of Legislative Assembly

- Mahendrasinh Dharamsinh Patil

Member of the Maharashtra Legislative Assembly
- In office 1995–1999
- Preceded by: Hari Atmaram Mahajan
- Succeeded by: Gulab Raghunath Patil
- Constituency: Erandol

Member of the Maharashtra Legislative Assembly
- In office 1978–1980
- Preceded by: Digambar Shankar Patil
- Succeeded by: Parvatabai Chandrabhan Wagh
- Constituency: Erandol

Personal details
- Parent: Dharamsinh Patil (father)

Mahendrasinh Dharamsinh Patil is an Indian politician who served as a member of the Maharashtra Legislative Assembly two times 1978 and 1995 from the Erandol Assembly constituency.

== Political career ==
Patil was elected as an MLA from Erandol in the 1978 Maharashtra Legislative Assembly election as a candidate of the Janata Party. His election was also discussed in a 2020 article published by Mumbai Tarun Bharat on the political history of Maharashtra.

He was re-elected as an MLA from Erandol in the 1995 Maharashtra Legislative Assembly election as a candidate of the Janata Dal.

Patil's political activities in the Erandol area have been covered by Maharashtra Times. A 2014 report on the Erandol-Parola constituency discussed Patil in the context of the constituency's local political contest.

In 2020, Sakal reported on the electoral tradition in Dharagir and referred to Patil in connection with local elections and political affairs in the village. A 2021 report by Maharashtra Times similarly discussed Patil's association with Dharagir's tradition of uncontested local elections.

In 2019, Sakal reported on a demand made by Patil concerning water for the Anjani project.

In May 2024, Patil joined the Bharatiya Janata Party. Sakal reported his joining and referred to his earlier political career and activities concerning the Anjani and Padmalaya projects.

In July 2026, Lokmat reported on Patil's involvement in the work concerning the Dharagir sub-centre and quoted his comments on the project.

== Election statistics ==
Year	Constituency	Party	Votes	%	Primary Opposition Candidate	Opposition Party	Opposition Votes	Opposition %	Margin	Result	Ref.
1978	Erandol	JP	25,829	33.66%	Parvatabai Chandrabhan Wagh	INC(I)	19,267	25.11%	+6,562	✓ Won	
1995	Erandol	JD	50,391	40.19%	Ramesh Jagannath Mahajan	SS	31,405	25.04%	+18,986	✓ Won	
1999	Erandol	JD(S)	40,621	38.82%	Gulab Raghunath Patil	SS	44,711	42.73%	-4,090	✗ Lost	
2004	Erandol	INC	57,429	40.50%	Gulab Raghunath Patil	SS	68,767	48.49%	-11,338	✗ Lost	

== Positions held ==
- Member of the Maharashtra Legislative Assembly (MLA) – Erandol constituency (1978–1980, 1995–1999)
- Vice President, Jalgaon District Central Co-operative Bank
- Director, Jalgaon District Central Co-operative Bank
- Chairman (Sabhapati), Panchayat Samiti
- Chairman, Dharangaon Agricultural Produce Market Committee (APMC)
- Chairman, Shetki Sangh (Agricultural Co-operative Union)
- Member, Jalgaon Zilla Parishad
