= Erandol Assembly constituency =

Constituency of the Maharashtra legislative assembly in India

Coordinates: 20.93°N 75.33°E

Erandol
- Constituency No. 16 for the Maharashtra Legislative Assembly

Constituency details
- Country: India
- Region: Western India
- State: Maharashtra
- District: Jalgaon
- Lok Sabha constituency: Jalgaon
- Established: 1951
- Total electors: 294,461
- Reservation: None

Member of Legislative Assembly
- 15th Maharashtra Legislative Assembly
- Incumbent Amol Patil
- Party: SHS
- Alliance: NDA
- Elected year: 2024

Erandol Assembly constituency is one of the 288 Vidhan Sabha constituencies of Maharashtra state in western India. This constituency is located in the Jalgaon district.

== Overview ==
It is part of the Jalgaon Lok Sabha constituency along with another five Vidhan Sabha segments of this district, namely Jalgaon City, Jalgaon Rural, Amalner, Chalisgaon and Pachora.

== Members of the Legislative Assembly ==
Election	Member	Party
1952	Sitaram Hirachand Birla	Indian National Congress
1957	Sitaram Hirachand Birla	Indian National Congress
1962	Digambar Shankar Patil	Indian National Congress
1967	Digambar Shankar Patil	Indian National Congress
1972	Digambar Shankar Patil	Indian National Congress
1978	Mahendrasinh Dharamsinh Patil	Janata Party
1980	Parvatabai Chandrabhan Wagh	Indian National Congress (I)
1985	Parvatabai Chandrabhan Wagh	Indian National Congress
1990	Hari Atmaram Mahajan	Shiv Sena
1995	Mahendrasinh Dharamsinh Patil	Janata Dal
1999	Gulab Raghunath Patil	Shiv Sena
2004	Gulab Raghunath Patil	Shiv Sena
2009	Chimanrao Patil	Shiv Sena
2014	Dr. Satish Bhaskarrao Patil	Nationalist Congress Party
2019	Chimanrao Patil	Shiv Sena
2024	Amol Patil	Shiv Sena

== Election results ==
=== Assembly Election 2024 ===
2024 Maharashtra Legislative Assembly election : Erandol
Party	Candidate	Votes	%	±%
SS	Amol Patil	101,088	50.00%	▲3.14
NCP-SP	Dr. Satish Bhaskarrao Patil	44,756	22.14%	New
Independent	Bhagwan Asaram Patil (Mahajan)	41,395	20.48%	New
Independent	Dr. Harshal Manohar Mane (Patil)	6,373	3.15%	New
Independent	Dr. Sambhajiraje R. Patil	2,845	1.41%	New
Independent	Amit Rajendra Patil	1,703	0.84%	New
Independent	A. T. Nana Patil	1,576	0.78%	New
NOTA	None of the above	1,509	0.75%	▼0.38
Margin of victory		56,332	27.87%	▲17.66
Turnout		203,668	69.17%	▲5.53
Total valid votes		202,159		
Registered electors		294,461		▲5.00
SS hold		Swing	▲3.14	

=== Assembly Election 2019 ===
2019 Maharashtra Legislative Assembly election : Erandol
Party	Candidate	Votes	%	±%
SS	Chimanrao Patil	82,650	46.86%	▲14.99
NCP	Dr. Satish Bhaskarrao Patil	64,648	36.65%	▲3.60
Independent	Shirole Govind Eknath	24,587	13.94%	New
VBA	Gautam Madhukar Pawar	2,303	1.31%	New
NOTA	None of the above	1,995	1.13%	▲0.54
Margin of victory		18,002	10.21%	▲9.03
Turnout		178,468	63.64%	▼2.54
Total valid votes		176,380		
Registered electors		280,441		▲9.30
SS gain from NCP		Swing	▲13.81	

=== Assembly Election 2014 ===
2014 Maharashtra Legislative Assembly election : Erandol
Party	Candidate	Votes	%	±%
NCP	Dr. Satish Bhaskarrao Patil	55,656	33.05%	▼12.92
SS	Chimanrao Patil	53,673	31.87%	▼16.35
BJP	Machhindra Ratan Patil	28,901	17.16%	New
MNS	Patil Narendrasingh Jayveersingh	24,094	14.31%	New
INC	Wagh Pravin Chandrabhan	1,670	0.99%	New
Independent	Patil Satish Bhaskrrao	1,528	0.91%	New
NOTA	None of the above	992	0.59%	New
Margin of victory		1,983	1.18%	▼1.07
Turnout		169,812	66.18%	▲3.79
Total valid votes		168,407		
Registered electors		256,583		▲9.04
NCP gain from SS		Swing	▼15.17	

=== Assembly Election 2009 ===
2009 Maharashtra Legislative Assembly election : Erandol
Party	Candidate	Votes	%	±%
SS	Chimanrao Patil	70,708	48.22%	▼0.27
NCP	Dr. Satish Bhaskarrao Patil	67,410	45.97%	New
Independent	Annaso. Satish Bhaskarrao Patil	2,427	1.65%	New
Independent	Mahajan Vijay Pandharinath	1,769	1.21%	New
Independent	Patil Bapu Dashrath	1,201	0.82%	New
BSP	Valmik Prabhakar Lokhande	1,132	0.77%	▼6.60
Margin of victory		3,298	2.25%	▼5.75
Turnout		146,825	62.39%	▼8.14
Total valid votes		146,648		
Registered electors		235,318		▲17.03
SS hold		Swing	▼0.27	

=== Assembly Election 2004 ===
2004 Maharashtra Legislative Assembly election : Erandol
Party	Candidate	Votes	%	±%
SS	Gulab Raghunath Patil	68,767	48.49%	▲5.76
INC	Patil Mahendrasinh Dharamsinh	57,429	40.50%	New
BSP	Mahajan Sanjay Chhagan	10,445	7.37%	New
Independent	Prof. Pawar Prataprao Ramdas	2,945	2.08%	New
Independent	Nannaware Mukundrao Shyamrao	1,067	0.75%	New
Margin of victory		11,338	8.00%	▲4.09
Turnout		141,816	70.53%	▲5.71
Total valid votes		141,808		
Registered electors		201,082		▲15.92
SS hold		Swing	▲5.76	

=== Assembly Election 1999 ===
1999 Maharashtra Legislative Assembly election : Erandol
Party	Candidate	Votes	%	±%
SS	Gulab Raghunath Patil	44,711	42.73%	▲17.69
JD(S)	Patil Mahendrasinh Dharamsinh	40,621	38.82%	New
Independent	Deshmukh Subhash Bhika	8,014	7.66%	New
Independent	Jadhav Dnyaneshwar Bhadu	6,562	6.27%	New
Independent	Afjal Khan Shobha Khan	3,136	3.00%	New
Independent	Parwejali Sayyed Tafzuali Sayyed	757	0.72%	New
Margin of victory		4,090	3.91%	▼11.23
Turnout		112,436	64.82%	▼12.63
Total valid votes		104,633		
Registered electors		173,459		▲3.25
SS gain from JD		Swing	▲2.54	

=== Assembly Election 1995 ===
1995 Maharashtra Legislative Assembly election : Erandol
Party	Candidate	Votes	%	±%
JD	Patil Mahendrasinh Dharamsinh	50,391	40.19%	▲13.84
SS	Mahajan Ramesh Jagannath	31,405	25.04%	▼12.36
INC	Wagh Parvatabai Chandrabhan	16,875	13.46%	▼19.23
Independent	Patil Anandrao Namdeorao	12,798	10.21%	New
Independent	Pathan Ayyubkha Khudadkha	5,156	4.11%	New
BSP	Visave Bhanudas Shankar	2,250	1.79%	New
Independent	Jain Satishkumar Bhikamchand	1,864	1.49%	New
Independent	Sonawane Rajesh Pitambar	1,076	0.86%	New
Margin of victory		18,986	15.14%	▲10.43
Turnout		130,107	77.45%	▲13.76
Total valid votes		125,396		
Registered electors		167,996		▲6.42
JD gain from SS		Swing	▲2.79	

=== Assembly Election 1990 ===
1990 Maharashtra Legislative Assembly election : Erandol
Party	Candidate	Votes	%	±%
SS	Mahajan Hari Atmaram	36,685	37.40%	New
INC	Wagh Parvatabai Chandrabhan	32,068	32.69%	▼4.99
JD	Patil Mahendrasinh Dharamsinh	25,849	26.35%	New
Doordarshi Party	Patil Hilal Bhagwan	842	0.86%	New
INS(SCS)	Patil Sukdeo Tukaram	660	0.67%	New
Margin of victory		4,617	4.71%	▼2.01
Turnout		100,537	63.69%	▲5.46
Total valid votes		98,094		
Registered electors		157,865		▲21.54
SS gain from INC		Swing	▼0.28	

=== Assembly Election 1985 ===
1985 Maharashtra Legislative Assembly election : Erandol
Party	Candidate	Votes	%	±%
INC	Wagh Parvatabai Chandrabhan	27,804	37.68%	New
Independent	Patil Nimbajirao Baliram	22,846	30.96%	New
JP	Patil Vijay Dhanaji	18,120	24.55%	New
LKD	D. V. Badgujar	2,478	3.36%	New
Independent	Parihar Yograjsingh Shankrasingh	925	1.25%	New
Independent	Jagdev Namdev Mhazu	805	1.09%	New
Independent	Patil Jagannath Hemraj	481	0.65%	New
Margin of victory		4,958	6.72%	▼5.18
Turnout		75,629	58.23%	▲14.06
Total valid votes		73,798		
Registered electors		129,882		▲7.92
INC gain from INC(I)		Swing	▼8.90	

=== Assembly Election 1980 ===
1980 Maharashtra Legislative Assembly election : Erandol
Party	Candidate	Votes	%	±%
INC(I)	Wagh Parvatabai Chandrabhan	24,111	46.58%	▲21.47
JP	Patil Vijay Dhanaji	17,950	34.68%	New
Independent	Parihar Yograjsinh Shankarsing	3,400	6.57%	New
BJP	Pawar (Patil) Pandurang Baliram	3,284	6.34%	New
Independent	Patil Dayaram Fakira	2,161	4.17%	New
Independent	Sk. Lukman Sk. Kadar Mansuri	510	0.99%	New
Independent	Gaikwad Ramsing Sonusing	350	0.68%	New
Margin of victory		6,161	11.90%	▲3.35
Turnout		53,154	44.17%	▼27.89
Total valid votes		51,766		
Registered electors		120,351		▲9.09
INC(I) gain from JP		Swing	▲12.92	

=== Assembly Election 1978 ===
1978 Maharashtra Legislative Assembly election : Erandol
Party	Candidate	Votes	%	±%
JP	Patil Mahendrasinh Dharamsinh	25,829	33.66%	New
INC(I)	Wagh Parvatabai Chandrabhan	19,267	25.11%	New
INC	Pawar Murlidhar Gangaram	18,937	24.68%	▼32.95
Independent	Parihar Yograjsinh Shankarsinh	12,419	16.19%	New
Margin of victory		6,562	8.55%	▼24.87
Turnout		79,501	72.06%	▲14.62
Total valid votes		76,724		
Registered electors		110,326		▲19.79
JP gain from INC		Swing	▼23.97	

=== Assembly Election 1972 ===
1972 Maharashtra Legislative Assembly election : Erandol
Party	Candidate	Votes	%	±%
INC	Digambar Shankar Patil	29,248	57.63%	▲7.66
SSP	M. Dattatraya Dandawate	12,288	24.21%	New
Independent	Y. S. Parihar	9,211	18.15%	New
Margin of victory		16,960	33.42%	▲12.87
Turnout		52,900	57.44%	▼7.92
Total valid votes		50,747		
Registered electors		92,096		▲9.99
INC hold		Swing	▲7.66	

=== Assembly Election 1967 ===
1967 Maharashtra Legislative Assembly election : Erandol
Party	Candidate	Votes	%	±%
INC	Digambar Shankar Patil	24,312	49.97%	▼1.67
Independent	Y. S. Parihar	14,316	29.43%	New
SSP	P. S. Chavan	6,906	14.20%	New
PSP	H. A. B. Y. N. Deshmukh	3,116	6.40%	▼8.43
Margin of victory		9,996	20.55%	▼3.74
Turnout		54,728	65.36%	▲1.60
Total valid votes		48,650		
Registered electors		83,732		▲12.79
INC hold		Swing	▼1.67	

=== Assembly Election 1962 ===
1962 Maharashtra Legislative Assembly election : Erandol
Party	Candidate	Votes	%	±%
INC	Digambar Shankar Patil	22,571	51.64%	▲0.90
Independent	Yogarajasinha Shankarsinha Parihar	11,955	27.35%	New
PSP	Pitambar Zinga Chavan	6,481	14.83%	▼34.43
Socialist	Bhika Dagdu Pawar	2,699	6.18%	New
Margin of victory		10,616	24.29%	▲22.80
Turnout		47,333	63.76%	▲5.58
Total valid votes		43,706		
Registered electors		74,236		▲9.03
INC hold		Swing	▲0.90	

=== Assembly Election 1957 ===
1957 Bombay State Legislative Assembly election : Erandol
Party	Candidate	Votes	%	±%
INC	Birla Sitaram Hirachand	20,104	50.74%	▼0.33
PSP	Chavan Pitamber Zinga	19,514	49.26%	New
Margin of victory		590	1.49%	▼15.74
Turnout		39,618	58.18%	▼3.98
Total valid votes		39,618		
Registered electors		68,090		▲31.99
INC hold		Swing	▼0.33	

=== Assembly Election 1952 ===
1952 Bombay State Legislative Assembly election : Erandol
Party	Candidate	Votes	%	±%
INC	Birla Sitaram Hirachand	16,377	51.07%	New
Independent	Parihar Yogarajsing Shankarsing	10,852	33.84%	New
Socialist	Patil Gansing Bhaga	2,705	8.44%	New
Kamgar Kisan Paksha	Chavan Sahebrao Nathu	2,134	6.65%	New
Margin of victory		5,525	17.23%	
Turnout		32,068	62.16%	
Total valid votes		32,068		
Registered electors		51,588		
INC win (new seat)				

== See also ==
- Erandol
- List of constituencies of Maharashtra Vidhan Sabha
