= Shirish Hiralal Chaudhari =

Indian politician

Shirish Hiralal Chaudhari is an Indian politician popularly known as shirishdada, who is a member of the 15th Maharashtra Legislative Assembly. He is an independent candidate, winning by a margin of 21,239 against the Modi wave.

Chaudhari represents the Amalner Assembly Constituency. He was the first MLA to establish free gymnasium centers in Amalner district.
