= A. T. Patil =

Indian politician

Ashok Tapiram Patil

Member of the Indian Parliament for Jalgaon
- In office 16 May 2009 – 23 May 2019
- Preceded by: Vasantrao Jivanrao More
- Succeeded by: Unmesh Bhaiyyasaheb Patil

Personal details
- Born: 9 September 1961 (age 64) Parola, Jalgaon (Maharashtra)
- Party: BJP
- Spouse: Hemalata
- Children: 3
- As of 28 February, 2015

Ashok Tapiram Patil, also known as Nana Patil, is an Indian politician and a member of the 16th Lok Sabha. He represents the Jalgaon constituency of Maharashtra and is a member of the Bharatiya Janata Party (BJP) political party.

== Political career ==
- 1990-95 & 95-97: Corporator Parola Nagarpalika (two terms)
- 1998-2000: President Parola Nagarpalika
- 2001-06: President Parola Nagarpalika
- 2002-05: Chairman A.P.M.C Parola, District. Jalgaon
- 31 August 2009: member, Committee on Defence, Consultative Committee, Ministry of Housing, Consultative Committee, Ministry of Urban Poverty Alleviation and Ministry of Tourism
- 16 May 2014: re-elected to 16th Lok Sabha (2nd term)
- 1 September 2014 onwards: member, Committee on Government Assurances; member, Standing Committee on Railways

== Special interests ==
His interests include agriculture and defence affairs.
