= Smita Wagh =

Indian politician

Member of Parliament, Lok Sabha
- Incumbent
- Assumed office 4 June 2024
- Preceded by: Unmesh Patil
- Constituency: Jalgaon

Member of Maharashtra Legislative Council
- In office 30 January 2015 – 24 April 2020
- Preceded by: Vinod Tawde
- Constituency: elected by Members of Legislative Assembly

Personal details
- Born: 26 March 1968 (age 58) Nimgul, Sindkheda, Dhule district, Maharashtra, India
- Party: Bharatiya Janata Party
- Spouse: Uday Wagh
- Children: 2 daughters
- Parents: Raosaheb (father); Sindhumati (mother)
- Education: Bachelor of Arts
- Alma mater: Pune University
- Profession: Businessperson, Politician

Shrimati "Smita" Uday Wagh is an Indian politician who is an elected member of the Parliament representing the Bharatiya Janata Party (BJP). Active in political life for the past 32 years with the Bharatiya Janata Party (BJP). Actively participated in student movements during college life (1985–1990) through the Akhil Bharatiya Vidyarthi Parishad, which led to the establishment of a separate university for North Maharashtra.

Active as a BJP worker for 32 years. Held the position of State President of BJP's Women's Wing and other roles according to the party's constitutional provisions. Currently serving as the Vice President of the BJP Maharashtra State Unit since 2022.

2003: Appointed as the District President of BJP Women's Wing, Jalgaon.

2009: Appointed as a Member of the BJP National Executive.

2012-2015: Served as the State President of BJP's Women's Wing.

== Administrative Positions and Electoral Wins ==
2002: Elected as a Member of the Jalgaon District Council. 2005: Elected as a Member of the Senate of North Maharashtra University. 2007: Re-elected as a Member of the Jalgaon District Council. 2009: Elected as the first woman President of Jalgaon District Council. 2012: Re-elected as a Member of the Jalgaon District Council for the third consecutive time. 2015: Elected as a Member of the Maharashtra Legislative Council by the Maharashtra Legislative Assembly members. 2018: Appointed as a Member of the Senate of North Maharashtra University by the Honorable Governor. 2023: Elected by a large majority as the Director of the Local Agricultural Produce Market, Amalner (Jalgaon district).

== Achievements in the Constituency ==
As the President of the Jalgaon District Council and an MLA, efforts have been made to facilitate the construction of dams and improve the transportation of agricultural produce. Specifically, in the Amalner Assembly constituency, steps were taken to revive the Nimtap Project, leading to its inclusion in the Prime Minister's Irrigation Scheme. The constituency has also benefitted from various central and state government schemes under BJP rule.

== Major Beneficiaries of Central and State Schemes in the Constituency ==
Pradhan Mantri Kisan Samman Nidhi Scheme: Approximately 325,000 beneficiaries

Ujjwala Gas Scheme: Approximately 80,000 beneficiaries

Pradhan Mantri Awas Yojana: Approximately 110,000 beneficiaries

Amrit Bharat Scheme: Reconstruction of Amalner and Dharangaon railway stations

== Key Achievements of Central and State Governments ==
Since 2014, under the leadership of Prime Minister Narendra Modi, a new era of social and economic equality has begun across India. The Pradhan Mantri Kisan Samman Nidhi Scheme has introduced a new dimension of respect for farmers, which has been further extended in Maharashtra by the MahaYuti government through the Namo Kisan Samman Yojana. The government's primary focus has been on national interest, prioritizing projects like the construction of the Ram Temple. The Pradhan Mantri Fasal Bima Yojana provides financial protection to farmers at a nominal cost of ₹1.
