= Satish Bhaskarrao Patil =

Indian politician

Dr. Satish Patil

Member of Maharashtra Legislative Assembly
- In office 2014–2019
- Preceded by: Chimanrao Patil
- Succeeded by: Chimanrao Patil
- Constituency: Erandol

Personal details
- Born: 29 November 1957 (age 68) Tamaswadi, Parola Taluka, Jalgaon District
- Party: Nationalist Congress Party
- As of 28 February, 2015

Dr. Satish Patil is an Indian politician and member of Maharashtra Legislative Assembly for Erandol-Parola Constituency.

== Personal Detail ==
Dr. Satish Bhaskarrao Patil was born on 29 November 1957 and completed education up to B.A.M.S.

== Political career ==
Dr. Satish Patil worked as a Minister of State of various portfolios in the state government such as Public Transport, Water Conservation, Earthquake Rehabilitation and Rescue, Sports and Youth Welfare as well as Women and Child Development etc. He was also the Guardian Minister of the Jalgaon district. Started from being a member of the Tamaswadi Gram-Panchayat, the journey of his political career has now culminated up to contesting the election for the parliament.

At present he is the director of the Maharashtra State Co-Operative Housing Federation, Jalgaon and the District Central Co-Operative Bank. Patil has made a considerable contribution even in the domain of education. He is also the President of the ‘Kisan Vidya Prasarak Mandal (Parola)’ and the Chairman of the ‘Nagrik Shikshan Mandal (Parola)’. He plays a decisively leading role even in the medical services being rendered across the district. He is also the President of the ‘Parola Taluka Doctors’ Association’ and the ‘Sanjay Gandhi Niradhar Yojana (Parola).
