= Vilas Potnis =

Member of Maharashtra Legislative Council
- In office 2018–2024
- Succeeded by: Anil Parab
- Constituency: Mumbai Graduate

Personal details
- Born: Mumbai, Maharashtra, India
- Party: Shiv sena
- Parent: -
- Occupation: Political

Vilas Potnis is a leader of Shiv sena and a member of Maharashtra Legislative Council from Mumbai.

Maharasthe Maharashtra Legislative Council from Mumbai Graduate constituency.

== Positions held ==
- 2018: Elected to Maharashtra Legislative Council
