= Avinash Mahatekar =

Indian politician

Minister of State for Social Justice and Special Assistance
- In office June 2019 – November 2019

Personal details
- Born: Avinash Mahatekar; 1948 (age 77–78)
- Party: Republican Party of India (A)
- Spouse: Vrushali

Avinash Sharad Mahatekar (born 1948) is an Indian politician and member of the Republican Party of India (A). He is spokesperson of Republican Party of India (A). He was sworn as Minister of State for Social Justice and Special Assistance in Devendra Fadnavis cabinet in June 2019. He was an activist in the Dalit Panther movement. He is an influential speaker in the Ambedkarite movement. He belongs to an Ambedkarite Buddhist family.
