= Amalner Assembly constituency =

Constituency of the Maharashtra legislative assembly in India

Coordinates: 21°2′43.49″N 75°3′40.72″E

Amalner
- Constituency No. 15 for the Maharashtra Legislative Assembly

Constituency details
- Country: India
- Region: Western India
- State: Maharashtra
- District: Jalgaon
- Lok Sabha constituency: Jalgaon
- Established: 1951
- Total electors: 309,256
- Reservation: None

Member of Legislative Assembly
- 15th Maharashtra Legislative Assembly
- Incumbent Anil Bhaidas Patil
- Party: NCP
- Alliance: NDA
- Elected year: 2024

Amalner Assembly constituency is one of the 288 Vidhan Sabha constituencies of Maharashtra state in western India. This constituency is located in the Jalgaon district.

== Overview ==
It is part of the Jalgaon Lok Sabha constituency along with another five Vidhan Sabha segments of this district, namely Jalgaon City, Jalgaon Rural, Erandol, Chalisgaon and Pachora.

== Members of the Legislative Assembly ==
Election	Member	Party
1952	Namdeo Yadav Patil	Indian National Congress
1957	Patil Madhav Gotu	Indian National Congress
1957	Shahjahankhan Jalamkhan Tadvi	Indian National Congress
1962	Shahjahankhan Jalamkhan Tadvi	Indian National Congress
1967	Krushibhushan Sahebrao Patil (K.M.Patil)	Indian National Congress
1972	Jagatrao Vyankatrao Pawar	Indian National Congress
1978	Gulabrao Wamanrao Patil	Janata Party
1980	Gulabrao Wamanrao Patil	Janata Party
1985	Amrutrao Vamanrao Patil	Indian National Congress
1990	Gulabrao Wamanrao Patil	Janata Dal
1995	Dr. Abasaheb B. S. Patil	Bharatiya Janata Party
1999	Dr. Abasaheb B. S. Patil	Bharatiya Janata Party
2004	Dr. Abasaheb B. S. Patil	Bharatiya Janata Party
2009	Krushibhushan Sahebrao Patil	Independent politician
2014	Shirish Hiralal Chaudhari	Independent politician
2019	Anil Bhaidas Patil	Nationalist Congress Party
2024	Anil Bhaidas Patil	Nationalist Congress Party

== Election results ==
=== Assembly Election 2024 ===
2024 Maharashtra Legislative Assembly election : Amalner
Party	Candidate	Votes	%	±%
NCP	Anil Bhaidas Patil	109,445	53.85%	New
Independent	Shirish Hiralal Chaudhari	76,010	37.40%	New
INC	Dr. Anil Nathu Shinde	13,798	6.79%	New
NOTA	None of the above	1,329	0.65%	▼0.17
Margin of victory		33,435	16.45%	▲11.76
Turnout		204,567	66.15%	▲3.14
Total valid votes		203,238		
Registered electors		309,256		▲5.32
NCP gain from NCP		Swing	▲2.73	

=== Assembly Election 2019 ===
2019 Maharashtra Legislative Assembly election : Amalner
Party	Candidate	Votes	%	±%
NCP	Anil Bhaidas Patil	93,757	51.12%	▲25.24
BJP	Shirish Hiralal Chaudhari	85,163	46.43%	▲18.63
VBA	Shravan Dharma Vanjari	1,909	1.04%	New
NOTA	None of the above	1,503	0.82%	▲0.13
Margin of victory		8,594	4.69%	▼7.90
Turnout		185,013	63.01%	▼1.05
Total valid votes		183,403		
Registered electors		293,648		▲10.64
NCP gain from Independent		Swing	▲10.73	

=== Assembly Election 2014 ===
2014 Maharashtra Legislative Assembly election : Amalner
Party	Candidate	Votes	%	±%
Independent	Shirish Hiralal Chaudhari	68,149	40.39%	New
BJP	Anil Bhaidas Patil	46,910	27.80%	▼2.41
NCP	Krushibhushan Sahebrao Patil	43,667	25.88%	New
SS	Anil Ambar Patil	2,879	1.71%	New
Independent	Sonawane Mangalabai Bapu	1,557	0.92%	New
INC	Eng. Girish Sonji Patil	1,458	0.86%	▼16.48
Independent	Patil Anil Bhaidas (Dhabe)	1,293	0.77%	New
NOTA	None of the above	1,162	0.69%	New
Margin of victory		21,239	12.59%	▲5.51
Turnout		170,019	64.06%	▲5.53
Total valid votes		168,711		
Registered electors		265,405		▲5.14
Independent hold		Swing	▲3.09	

=== Assembly Election 2009 ===
2009 Maharashtra Legislative Assembly election : Amalner
Party	Candidate	Votes	%	±%
Independent	Krushibhushan Sahebrao Patil	55,084	37.30%	New
BJP	Anil Bhaidas Patil	44,621	30.21%	▼11.08
INC	Adv. Lalita Sham Patil	25,609	17.34%	▼23.36
Independent	Dr. Abasaheb B. S. Patil	10,422	7.06%	New
MNS	Dr. Dipak Pandharinath Patil	3,714	2.51%	New
Independent	Er. Milind Laxmikant Patil	2,315	1.57%	New
Independent	Krushi Tadnya Sahebrao Dhondu Patil	1,699	1.15%	New
BSP	Netkar Arun Dajiba	1,166	0.79%	▼0.19
Margin of victory		10,463	7.08%	▲6.49
Turnout		147,747	58.53%	▼5.19
Total valid votes		147,681		
Registered electors		252,420		▲29.75
Independent gain from BJP		Swing	▼3.99	

=== Assembly Election 2004 ===
2004 Maharashtra Legislative Assembly election : Amalner
Party	Candidate	Votes	%	±%
BJP	Dr. Abasaheb B. S. Patil	51,103	41.29%	▼8.74
INC	Adv. Lalita Sham Patil	50,371	40.70%	▲17.95
Independent	Ashok Pawar	14,348	11.59%	New
Independent	Sunil Walmik Dhabhade (Sonar)	2,009	1.62%	New
SP	Salunkhe Dipaksingh Rambhau	1,579	1.28%	New
Independent	Shaikh Nasiroddin Haji Sharfoddin	1,378	1.11%	New
BSP	Sonar Dhananjay Bansilal	1,219	0.98%	New
Independent	Dr. Bhanudas Santosh Patil	1,103	0.89%	New
Margin of victory		732	0.59%	▼26.69
Turnout		123,955	63.72%	▲2.17
Total valid votes		123,768		
Registered electors		194,543		▲12.42
BJP hold		Swing	▼8.74	

=== Assembly Election 1999 ===
1999 Maharashtra Legislative Assembly election : Amalner
Party	Candidate	Votes	%	±%
BJP	Dr. Abasaheb B. S. Patil	49,523	50.03%	▲20.38
INC	Shinde Anil Nathu	22,523	22.75%	▼6.15
JD(S)	Gulabrao Wamanrao Patil	21,351	21.57%	New
Independent	Bagul Gulabrao Waman	4,562	4.61%	New
Independent	Bhoi Hiralal Babulal	1,027	1.04%	New
Margin of victory		27,000	27.28%	▲26.53
Turnout		106,504	61.55%	▼11.25
Total valid votes		98,986		
Registered electors		173,050		▲0.30
BJP hold		Swing	▲20.38	

=== Assembly Election 1995 ===
1995 Maharashtra Legislative Assembly election : Amalner
Party	Candidate	Votes	%	±%
BJP	Dr. Abasaheb B. S. Patil	35,838	29.65%	New
INC	Amrutrao Vamanrao Patil	34,934	28.90%	▼3.04
Independent	Gulabrao Wamanrao Patil	30,262	25.04%	New
Independent	Bhandarkar Subhashchandra Dodhu	8,631	7.14%	New
BBM	Landge Ramchandra Dhoman	3,713	3.07%	New
Independent	Koli Baburao Kalu	2,901	2.40%	New
Independent	Gulabrao Wamanrao Patil	2,063	1.71%	New
Margin of victory		904	0.75%	▼11.84
Turnout		125,598	72.80%	▲9.92
Total valid votes		120,875		
Registered electors		172,533		▲6.75
BJP gain from JD		Swing	▼14.88	

=== Assembly Election 1990 ===
1990 Maharashtra Legislative Assembly election : Amalner
Party	Candidate	Votes	%	±%
JD	Gulabrao Wamanrao Patil	44,211	44.53%	New
INC	Dajiba Parvat Patil	31,714	31.94%	▼21.11
SS	Sutar Devidas Motiram	19,208	19.34%	New
Independent	Shravan Sada Brahme	2,103	2.12%	New
Independent	Maharu Dagadu Patil	1,362	1.37%	New
Doordarshi Party	Patil Pandurang Bhila	606	0.61%	New
Margin of victory		12,497	12.59%	▲5.88
Turnout		101,622	62.88%	▲1.07
Total valid votes		99,293		
Registered electors		161,625		▲18.95
JD gain from INC		Swing	▼8.52	

=== Assembly Election 1985 ===
1985 Maharashtra Legislative Assembly election : Amalner
Party	Candidate	Votes	%	±%
INC	Amrutrao Vamanrao Patil	43,545	53.05%	New
JP	Gulabrao Wamanrao Patil	38,041	46.34%	New
Independent	Patil Pandurang Bhila	499	0.61%	New
Margin of victory		5,504	6.71%	▼3.14
Turnout		83,991	61.81%	▲5.83
Total valid votes		82,085		
Registered electors		135,879		▲11.60
INC gain from JP		Swing	▼1.47	

=== Assembly Election 1980 ===
1980 Maharashtra Legislative Assembly election : Amalner
Party	Candidate	Votes	%	±%
JP	Gulabrao Wamanrao Patil	36,179	54.52%	New
INC(I)	Chavan Sambhaji Govindrao	29,640	44.66%	▲17.43
Independent	Patil Pandurang Bhila	544	0.82%	New
Margin of victory		6,539	9.85%	▼19.63
Turnout		68,156	55.98%	▼12.69
Total valid votes		66,363		
Registered electors		121,756		▲4.29
JP gain from JP		Swing	▼2.19	

=== Assembly Election 1978 ===
1978 Maharashtra Legislative Assembly election : Amalner
Party	Candidate	Votes	%	±%
JP	Gulabrao Wamanrao Patil	43,697	56.71%	New
INC(I)	Dabhade Ramdas Sugram	20,983	27.23%	New
RPI	Patil Madhukar Atmaram	12,368	16.05%	New
Margin of victory		22,714	29.48%	▼45.76
Turnout		80,167	68.67%	▲10.60
Total valid votes		77,048		
Registered electors		116,746		▲37.47
JP gain from INC		Swing	▼29.29	

=== Assembly Election 1972 ===
1972 Maharashtra Legislative Assembly election : Amalner
Party	Candidate	Votes	%	±%
INC	Jagatrao Vyankatrao Pawar	40,223	86.00%	▲28.63
ABJS	Namdeo Maharu Patil	5,034	10.76%	▲1.44
Independent	Pralad Ramdas Baviskar	1,110	2.37%	New
Independent	Natu Narayan Chaudhar	402	0.86%	New
Margin of victory		35,189	75.24%	▲37.20
Turnout		49,320	58.07%	▼3.49
Total valid votes		46,769		
Registered electors		84,927		▲6.82
INC hold		Swing	▲28.63	

=== Assembly Election 1967 ===
1967 Maharashtra Legislative Assembly election : Amalner
Party	Candidate	Votes	%	±%
INC	Krushibhushan Sahebrao Patil	25,087	57.37%	▼2.49
PSP	Gulabrao Wamanrao Patil	8,452	19.33%	▲11.72
CPI	V. D. Chavan	6,114	13.98%	▲1.68
ABJS	D. D. Agawal	4,076	9.32%	New
Margin of victory		16,635	38.04%	▼5.31
Turnout		48,943	61.56%	▲5.29
Total valid votes		43,729		
Registered electors		79,508		▲11.38
INC hold		Swing	▼2.49	

=== Assembly Election 1962 ===
1962 Maharashtra Legislative Assembly election : Amalner
Party	Candidate	Votes	%	±%
INC	Shahjahankhan Jalamkhan Tadvi	21,817	59.86%	▲11.99
ABJS	Anilkumar Prashi Chavan	6,018	16.51%	New
CPI	Bhavansing Savaji Sovawane	4,484	12.30%	▲0.81
PSP	Kautik Baudu Bhil	2,772	7.61%	New
Independent	Laxman Khandu Bagole	1,355	3.72%	New
Margin of victory		15,799	43.35%	▲37.18
Turnout		40,166	56.27%	▼45.77
Total valid votes		36,446		
Registered electors		71,387		▼47.56
INC hold		Swing	▲35.08	

=== Assembly Election 1957 ===
1957 Bombay State Legislative Assembly election : Amalner
Party	Candidate	Votes	%	±%
INC	Patil Madhav Gotu	34,417	24.78%	▼22.43
INC	Shahjahankhan Jalamkhan Tadvi	32,081	23.10%	▼24.11
Independent	Shet Maganlal Nagindas	25,843	18.61%	New
CPI	Chikate Malhari Ramaji	15,963	11.49%	▼12.32
Independent	Dajiba Fakira Patil	15,820	11.39%	New
Independent	Bhil Kathu Totaram	14,778	10.64%	New
Margin of victory		8,574	6.17%	▼17.23
Turnout		138,902	102.04%	▲42.84
Total valid votes		138,902		
Registered electors		136,130		▲156.99
INC hold		Swing	▼22.43	

=== Assembly Election 1952 ===
1952 Bombay State Legislative Assembly election : Amalner
Party	Candidate	Votes	%	±%
INC	Namdeo Yadav Patil	14,805	47.21%	New
CPI	Vishram Dodhu Chavan	7,468	23.81%	New
Socialist	Pandharinath Dodhu Pawar	4,206	13.41%	New
Independent	Dajiba Fakira Patil	3,325	10.60%	New
Independent	Sahebrao Sadashiv Patil	1,556	4.96%	New
Margin of victory		7,337	23.40%	
Turnout		31,360	59.20%	
Total valid votes		31,360		
Registered electors		52,971		
INC win (new seat)				

== See also ==
- Amalner
- List of constituencies of Maharashtra Vidhan Sabha
