= Amol Patil =

Indian politician

Member of the Maharashtra Legislative Assembly
- Incumbent
- Assumed office 23 November 2024
- Preceded by: Chimanrao Patil
- Constituency: Erandol

Personal details
- Born: 1978 (age 47–48) Erandol, Jalgaon district
- Party: Shiv Sena
- Parent: Chimanrao Patil (father)
- Education: North Maharashtra University

Amol Chimanrao Patil (born 1978) is an Indian politician. He is a member of the Maharashtra Legislative Assembly from Erandol Assembly constituency in Jalgaon district. He won the 2024 Maharashtra Legislative Assembly election, representing the Shiv Sena.

== Early life and education ==
Patil is from Erandol, Jalgaon district, Maharashtra. He is the son of Patil Chimanrao Rupchand, a farmer and former MLA.

He is a graduate with a BSL degree from North Maharashtra University, Jalgaon (2005).

== Career ==
He served as the vice-chairman of the Jalgaon District Central Cooperative Bank. He was also the chairman of the APMC in Pachora for 13 years.

Patil won from the Erandol Assembly constituency representing Shiv Sena Party in the 2024 Maharashtra Legislative Assembly election. He defeated his nearest rival, Satish Anna Patil of the Nationalist Congress Party (SP), by a huge margin of 56,332 votes. His father, the sitting MLA, had sought the ticket for Patil, considering his own age and the party high command had nominated his son to contest the 2024 Assembly election from Erandol seat.
