= Chandrakant Patil =

Indian politician (born 1959)

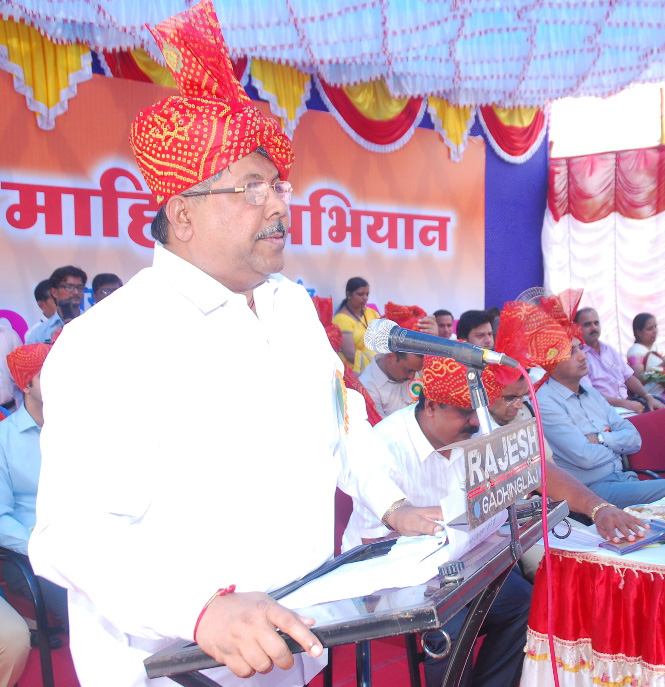

Leader of the House Maharashtra Legislative Council
- In office 8 July 2016 – 8 November 2019
- Chief Minister: Devendra Fadnavis
- Preceded by: Eknath Khadse
- Succeeded by: Subhash Desai (Acting)

Cabinet Minister Government of Maharashtra
- In office 31 October 2014 – 12 November 2019
- Cabinet: Fadnavis ministry
- Chief Minister: Devendra Fadnavis
- Portfolios: Public Works · Co-operation · Textiles · Revenue · Agriculture
- Incumbent
- Assumed office 9 August 2022
- Cabinet: Shinde ministry
- Chief Minister: Eknath Shinde; Devendra Fadnavis
- Portfolios: Higher & Technical Education · Parliamentary Affairs · Textiles

President of Bharatiya Janata Party, Maharashtra
- In office 16 July 2019 – 12 August 2022
- Preceded by: Raosaheb Danve
- Succeeded by: Chandrashekhar Bawankule

Member of Maharashtra Legislative Assembly
- Incumbent
- Assumed office 2019
- Preceded by: Medha Kulkarni
- Constituency: Kothrud

Member of Maharashtra Legislative Council
- In office 20 July 2008 – 25 October 2019
- Preceded by: Sharad Patil
- Succeeded by: Arun Lad
- Constituency: Pune Graduates

Personal details
- Born: 10 June 1959 (age 67) Bombay, Bombay State, India
- Party: Bharatiya Janata Party
- Education: Siddharth College
- Website: chandrakantdadapatil.in

Chandrakant Bacchu Patil is an Indian politician and the Higher and technical education minister of Maharashtra state in the present Government of Maharashtra. Chandrakant Patil was the Maharashtra state President of Bharatiya Janata Party (BJP) from 2019 to 2022.

He is a member of the legislative assembly of Maharashtra and represents the Kothrud Assembly constituency. Previously, he was a minister with portfolio of Revenue and Public Works Department and worked as the Guardian Minister of Kolhapur district, Sangli district and Pune district till 12 November 2019.

== Early life and education ==
Patil was born on 10 June 1959 in the Jamnadas Prabhudas Chawl in Parel, Mumbai. His father, Bacchu Patil, used to serve tea to mill workers. He completed schooling at Raja Shivaji Vidyalaya (formerly King George High School) in Dadar. He graduated from Siddharth College in Fort and graduated with a B.Com degree in 1980.

== Political career ==
He was introduced to the Akhil Bharatiya Vidyarthi Parishad at the age of 18. In 1980, he started working as a full-time activist for the ABVP. In 1982, he was appointed the 'Pradesh Mantri'. In 1985, Patil was elected as 'Kshetriya Sangathan Mantri' of the ABVP where he focused on the problems of the youth and student issues. In 1990, Dada Patil was elected as the Akhil Bharatiya Mantri of ABVP. At this time, he traveled to different districts of India to make people aware of social issues and addressed problems related to the education sector and the youth. In 2004, he joined the Bharatiya Janata Party and was elected as its Vice President in 2013. In June 2014, he was appointed a member of the Maharashtra Legislative Council. In October 2014, he was elected as Cabinet Minister of Maharashtra. He has been holding the Cabinet Minister's office since July 2016 and handling the revenue, relief & rehabilitation, and Public Works department.
