= Antulay ministry =

- Ministry of Maharashtra
- Date formed: 9 June 1980
- Date dissolved: 12 January 1982

People and organisations
- Governor: Sadiq Ali (1980); Om Prakash Mehra (1980-82)
- Chief Minister: A. R. Antulay
- Member parties: Congress
- Status in legislature: Majority government
- Opposition party: INC(U); JNP
- Opposition leader: Legislative Assembly: Sharad Pawar (INC(U)) (1980-81) Babanrao Dhakne (JNP) (1981-82); Legislative Council: Ganesh Prabhakar Pradhan (INC(U))

History
- Election: 1980
- Legislature term: 5 years
- Predecessor: Pawar I
- Successor: Bhosale

After the Congress (I) party secured a majority in 1980 Maharashtra legislative elections, A. R. Antulay was appointed Chief Minister. Antulay's administration continued until January 1982, when he resigned amidst corruption allegations. Till date, Antulay remains the state's only Muslim chief minister.

== List of ministers ==
The Antulay ministry consisted of:

Portfolio	Minister	Took office	Left office	Party
Chief Minister: General Administration; Home Affairs; Planning; Information and Public Relations; Information Technology; Water Supply; Sanitation; Command Area Development; Forest Department; Skill Development, Employment and Entrepreneurship; Minority Development and Aukaf; Khar Land Development; Earthquake Rehabilitation; State Excise; Departments or portfolios not allocated to any minister	A. R. Antulay	9 June 1980	12 January 1982	INC
Cabinet Minister: Public Works; (Excluding Public Undertakings): Revenue; Relief & Rehabilitation; Woman and Child Development; Co-operation	Shalini Patil	14 June 1980	31 August 1981	INC
Cabinet Minister: Finance; Urban Development; Disaster Management; Other Backward Classes	Ramrao Adik	14 June 1980	12 January 1982	INC
Cabinet Minister: Industries; Mining Department; Food and Drug Administration; Special Backward Classes Welfare; Ports Development; Public Works; (Including Public Undertakings)	Jawaharlal Darda	14 June 1980	12 January 1982	INC
Cabinet Minister: School Education; Health and Family Welfare; Prohibition	Baliram Waman Hiray	14 June 1980	12 January 1982	INC
Cabinet Minister: Rural Development; Jails; Socially And Educationally Backward Classes	Baburao Kale	14 June 1980	12 January 1982	INC
Cabinet Minister: Irrigation; Food and Civil Supplies; Marketing	Bhikaji Jijaba Khatal	14 June 1980	12 January 1982	INC
Cabinet Minister: Buildings; Communications; Dairy Development; Animal Husbandry; Fisheries; Employment Guarantee; Higher and Technical Education; Training; Soil and Water Conservation	Shivajirao Patil Nilangekar	14 June 1980	12 January 1982	INC
Cabinet Minister: Law and Judiciary; Labour; Transport; Marathi Language; Horticulture	Babasaheb Bhosale	14 June 1980	12 January 1982	INC
Cabinet Minister: Agriculture; Vimukta Jati, Majority Welfare Development	Bhagwantrai M. Gaikwad	14 June 1980	12 January 1982	INC
Cabinet Minister: Housing; Slum Improvement; Social Welfare (14 June 1980 – 09 March 1981); Tribal Welfare; Other Backward Bahujan Welfare	Pramilaben Yagnik	14 June 1980	12 January 1982	INC
Cabinet Minister: Energy; Tourism; Sports and Youth Services; Cultural Affairs; Legislative Affairs	Jayant Shridhar Tilak	14 June 1980	12 January 1982	INC
Cabinet Minister: Special Assistance (14 June 1980 – 09 March 1981); Environment and Climate Change	Narendra Mahipati Tidke	25 September 1980	12 January 1982	INC
Cabinet Minister: Protocol; Textiles; Nomadic Tribes; Medical Education; Special Assistance (09 March 1981 – 12 January 1982)	Nanabhau Yembadwar	25 September 1980	12 January 1982	INC
Cabinet Minister: Social Justice (09 March 1981 – 12 January 1982); Ex. Servicemen Welfare	Surupsingh Hirya Naik	25 September 1980	12 January 1982	INC
