= Babanrao Lonikar =

Indian politician

Minister of Water Supply & Sanitation Government of Maharashtra
- In office 5 December 2014 – 12 November 2019
- Chief Minister: Devendra Fadnavis
- Succeeded by: Gulab Raghunath Patil

Member of the Maharashtra Legislative Assembly
- Incumbent
- Assumed office 2014
- Preceded by: Sureshkumar Jethalia
- Constituency: Partur
- In office 1999–2009
- Preceded by: Abdul Kadir Abdul Wahed Deshmukh
- Succeeded by: Sureshkumar Jethalia
- Constituency: Partur

Personal details
- Born: 1 March 1965 (age 61) Loni, Jalna district, Maharashtra, India
- Party: Bhartiya Janata Party
- Spouse: Vandana Lonikar
- Children: Bhakti, & Shreejay
- Occupation: Politician, Farmer
- Website: official website

Babanrao Dattatray Yadav (Lonikar) (born 1 March 1965) is an Indian politician from Maharashtra state, and a member of the thirteenth 2014 Maharashtra Legislative Assembly election. He was the Minister of Water Supply and Sanitation in the Government of Maharashtra. He represents Partur-Mantha Vidhan Sabha Constituency in the Legislative Assembly of Maharashtra. He belongs to Bhartiya Janata Party.

== Political career ==
Babanrao Yadav is 55 years old. The MLA contested election from Partur, Maharashtra in the year 2019 and he won. Nowadays, he is associated with the Bharatiya Janata Party. Also, he was elected as Member of Maharashtra Legislative Assembly from Partur constituency in the years 1999, 2004 and 2014, respectively. Babanrao Yadav is also known as Babanrao Lonikar.

=== Positions held ===
He was also given responsibility of being guardian minister of Jalna district.

==== Within BJP ====
- State Vice President, BJP (1994)

==== Legislative ====
- Member of Maharashtra Legislative Assembly in 2014
- Member of Maharashtra Legislative Assembly in 2004-2009

Political offices
Preceded by Laxman Dhobale	Cabinet Minister for Water Supply and Sanitation, Maharashtra State; 2014–present	Incumbent
Preceded by	Maharashtra State Guardian Minister for Jalna district 2014–present	Incumbent
