= Chimanrao Patil =

Indian politician

Member of Maharashtra Legislative Assembly
- In office 2019–2024
- Succeeded by: Amol Chimanrao Patil
- Constituency: Erandol
- In office 2009–2014
- Preceded by: Gulabrao Patil
- Succeeded by: Satish Bhaskarrao Patil

Personal details
- Born: 20 March 1950 (age 76) Parola, Jalgaon District
- Party: Shiv Sena

Chimanrao Rupchand Patil is a politician from Jalgaon district, Maharashtra. He was a Member of Maharashtra Legislative Assembly from Erandol Vidhan Sabha constituency as a member of Shiv Sena.

== Positions held ==
- 2009: Elected to Maharashtra Legislative Assembly
- 2019: Elected to Maharashtra Legislative Assembly
