= Anil Parab =

Indian politician

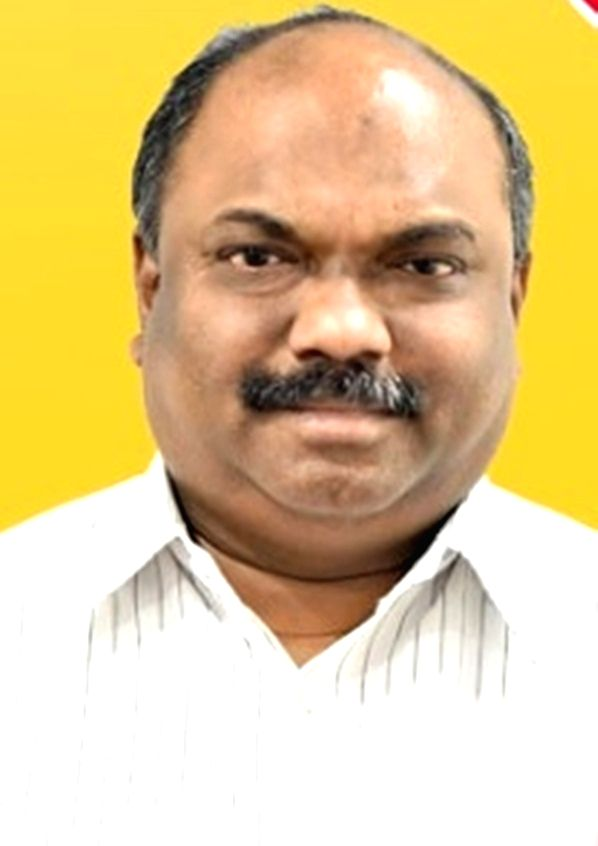

Minister of Transport Government of Maharashtra
- In office 30 December 2019 – 30 June 2022
- Chief Minister: Uddhav Thackeray
- Preceded by: Diwakar Raote
- Succeeded by: Eknath Shinde

Minister of Parliamentary Affairs Government of Maharashtra
- In office 30 December 2019 – 30 June 2022
- Chief Minister: Uddhav Thackeray
- Preceded by: Vinod Tawde
- Succeeded by: Chandrakant Patil

Member of Maharashtra Legislative Council
- Incumbent
- Assumed office 8 July 2024
- Preceded by: Vilas Potnis
- Constituency: Mumbai Graduates constituency
- In office 28 July 2012 – 8 July 2024
- Constituency: elected by Members of Legislative Assembly
- In office 8 July 2004 – 7 July 2010
- Constituency: elected by Members of Legislative Assembly

Personal details
- Party: Shiv Sena(UBT)

Anil Parab (Marathi: अनिल परब) (born 1974) is an Indian politician. He is affiliated with the Shiv Sena party. Parab served as the Transport & Parliamentary Affairs Minister of Maharashtra from 2019 until 2022. He is member of Maharashtra Legislative Council.

== Early life ==
He was born in Mumbai, Maharashtra.

== Career ==
Parab started his career in the cable business. He used to work for an auto rickshaw union.

He was accused of building Sai Resort at Dapoli in the name of a cable operator with money earned from extortion and corruption. The Enforcement Directorate registered a case against him for building this resort through money laundering. Kirit Somaiya registered a case with allegations of forgery, cheating and violation of rules.

=== Politics ===
- 2004: Elected to Maharashtra Legislative Council (1st term)
- 2012: Elected to Maharashtra Legislative Council (2nd term)
- 2017: Appointed Shiv Sena group leader in Maharashtra Legislative Council
- 2018: Elected to Maharashtra Legislative Council (3rd term)
- 2019: Appointed minister of Transport and Parliamentary Affairs
- 2020: Appointed guardian minister of Ratnagiri district
- 2024: Elected to Maharashtra Legislative Council (4th term)

== Criticism ==
The Enforcement Directorate summoned Parab for questioning on 28 September 2021, while probing a money laundering case. This was the second time Parab was summoned. He sought some time, citing commitments as a public servant and minister.The Enforcement Directorate conducted raids on his residences and offices on charges of money laundering and corruption.

Former Mumbai police officer Sachin Vaze alleged that he had received "time to time instructions" from Parab to collect bribes. He accused Parab of receiving kickbacks worth crores for the transfer of 10 police officers. Waze tried to submit a letter to a National Investigation Agency (NIA) court, claiming that Parab had asked him to extort Rs 50 crore from a private trust. Waze also alleged that Parab told him to look into an inquiry against the fraudulent contractors listed in the BMC and asked him to collect “at least Rs 2 crore” from about 50 such contractors.

Bajarang Kharmate was a Deputy RTO officer who was the agent to collect money and distribute it between Transport Commissioner Avinash Dhakne and Parab. Kharmate was also raided by Enforcement Directorate. Parab formed a group including Kharmate and Dhakne. Kharmate approved promotions with incorrect dates. Parab wanted to please Dhakne and gave lots of money to the minister. Nashik RTO Bharat Kalaskar worked as an agent and collected money on Dhakne's behalf. Kharmate collected money for Parab and Dhakne. Deputy Transport Commissioner Jitendra Patil was another participant. Kharmate deposited funds on the order of 200 crores for 2021 on behalf of Parab and Dhakne. Money was disbursed among them. Kalaskar worked as an agent and collected money on behalf of Dhakne. Khamate also collected money to cover Parab.

Kharmate received illegal promotions with an incorrect date. Parab wanted to please Kharmate with dated promotion as he gave a lot of money to the minister. Inspector Gajanan Patil launched a complaint against Parab, Kharmate, Dhakne and for corruption and filed a case in high court to follow up. Kharmate gained promotion through illegal means and became wealthy. Apart from bungalows in Pune, he had 4 LG showrooms and two jewellery showrooms in Pune, along with 100 acres of land. He is the owner of the Tanishq Jewellery franchise in Indore. Kalaskar received 35 lakhs per month and Rs 50 lakhs for the additional charge.

ED summoned Parab for questioning in connection to a money laundering case on 15 June 2022. Parab is facing other charges of alleged irregularities and corruption. The federal agency wants to question Parab under the Prevention of Money Laundering Act (PMLA).

The Enforcement Directorate has taken possession of Sai Resort NX in Ratnagiri as part of its money laundering probe against Shiv Sena leader Anil Parab. The resort is allegedly constructed on a piece of land in a no development zone. The ED has attached the plot and the resort, and has arrested Parab's close associate and a former officer The Enforcement Directorate (ED) Tuesday sought to intervene as a party respondent in the petition filed by Shiv Sena (UBT) leader Anil Parab seeking quashing of the FIR registered by Dapoli police station over alleged several irregularities in the construction of Sai Resort in Dapoli.
