= Partur Assembly constituency =

Constituency of the Maharashtra legislative assembly in India

Coordinates: 19.59°N 76.21°E

Partur
- Constituency No. 99 for the Maharashtra Legislative Assembly

Constituency details
- Country: India
- Region: Western India
- State: Maharashtra
- Division: Aurangabad
- District: Jalna
- Lok Sabha constituency: Parbhani
- Established: 1951 (75 years ago)
- Total electors: 323,263
- Reservation: None

Member of Legislative Assembly
- 15th Maharashtra Legislative Assembly
- Incumbent Babanrao Lonikar
- Party: BJP
- Elected year: 2024

Partur Assembly constituency is one of 288 assembly constituencies of Maharashtra state of India. It comes under Parbhani Lok Sabha constituency for Indian general elections.

== Geographical Scope ==
This constituency includes Partur and Mantha tehsils.

== Members of the Legislative Assembly ==
Election	Member	Party
1952	Ankush Rao	Peasants and Workers Party of India
1957	Bhagwanrao Daulatrao	Indian National Congress
1962	Bhagwanrao Daulatrao	Indian National Congress
1967	R. N. Yadav	Indian National Congress
1972	Haribhau Ramrao Barkule	Peasants and Workers Party of India
1978	Ramprasadji Vithalrao Borade	Indian National Congress
1980	Ramprasadji Vithalrao Borade	Indian National Congress
1985	Vaijanathrao Yadavrao Akat	Indian Congress
1990	Vaijanathrao Yadavrao Akat	Indian National Congress
1995	A. Kadir A. Wahed Deshmukh	Indian National Congress
1999	Babanrao Yadav Lonikar	Bharatiya Janata Party
2004	Babanrao Yadav Lonikar	Bharatiya Janata Party
2009	Sureshkumar Kanhaiyalal Jethaliya	Independent politician
2014	Babanrao Yadav Lonikar	Bharatiya Janata Party
2019	Babanrao Yadav Lonikar	Bharatiya Janata Party
2024	Babanrao Yadav Lonikar	Bharatiya Janata Party

== Election results ==
=== Assembly Election 2024 ===
2024 Maharashtra Legislative Assembly election : Partur
Party	Candidate	Votes	%	±%
BJP	Babanrao Yadav Lonikar	70,659	31.05	▼21.46
SS(UBT)	Asaram Jijabhau Borade (A. J. Patil)	65,919	28.97	New
Independent	Jethaliya Sureshkumar Kanhaiyalal	53,921	23.69	New
VBA	Ramprasad Kisanrao Thorat	29,810	13.10	▲8.84
Independent	Agrawal Mohankumar Hariprasad	1,633	0.72	New
NOTA	None of the above	1,163	0.51	▼0.06
Margin of victory		4,740	2.08	▼10.73
Turnout		228,732	70.76	▲2.01
Total valid votes		227,569		
Registered electors		323,263		▲9.10
BJP hold		Swing	▼21.46	

=== Assembly Election 2019 ===
2019 Maharashtra Legislative Assembly election : Partur
Party	Candidate	Votes	%	±%
BJP	Babanrao Dattatray Yadav	106,321	52.51	▲27.25
INC	Jethaliya Sureshkumar Kanhaiyalal	80,379	39.70	▲16.78
VBA	Shivaji Kamlaji Sawane	8,616	4.26	New
CPI(M)	Com. Sarita Maroti Khandare	2,183	1.08	New
NOTA	None of the above	1,151	0.57	▼0.57
Margin of victory		25,942	12.81	▲10.46
Turnout		203,704	68.75	▼1.49
Total valid votes		202,482		
Registered electors		296,299		▲10.75
BJP hold		Swing	▲27.25	

=== Assembly Election 2014 ===
2014 Maharashtra Legislative Assembly election : Partur
Party	Candidate	Votes	%	±%
BJP	Babanrao Dattatray Yadav	46,937	25.26	▲6.47
INC	Jethaliya Sureshkumar Kanhaiyalal	42,577	22.92	▲4.75
MNS	Akat Babasaheb Apparao	37,335	20.09	New
Independent	Chavan Niwas Dharamchand	24,371	13.12	New
SS	Sakhare Somnath Vaijanath	18,912	10.18	New
NCP	Rajesh Atmaram Sarkate	4,773	2.57	New
NOTA	None of the above	2,115	1.14	New
CPI(M)	Com. Khandare Maruti Vitthalrao	2,106	1.13	New
Margin of victory		4,360	2.35	▼4.58
Turnout		187,921	70.24	▲1.98
Total valid votes		185,800		
Registered electors		267,549		▲9.95
BJP gain from Independent		Swing	▼0.46	

=== Assembly Election 2009 ===
2009 Maharashtra Legislative Assembly election : Partur
Party	Candidate	Votes	%	±%
Independent	Jethaliya Sureshkumar Kanhaiyalal	42,702	25.72	New
BJP	Babanrao Dattarao Lonikar	31,200	18.79	▼11.64
INC	Anwar A. Kadir Deshmukh	30,161	18.17	▼2.44
Independent	Akat Babasaheb Apparao	22,355	13.47	New
Independent	Gopalrao Govindrao Borade	19,135	11.53	New
BSP	Pawar Udhav Rambhau	13,141	7.92	▼0.70
SWP	Bhosle Shivaji Bapurao	2,254	1.36	New
Independent	Late Anjiram Rakhmaji	1,974	1.19	New
Margin of victory		11,502	6.93	▼2.90
Turnout		166,110	68.26	▲0.56
Total valid votes		166,014		
Registered electors		243,336		▲20.76
Independent gain from BJP		Swing	▼4.71	

=== Assembly Election 2004 ===
2004 Maharashtra Legislative Assembly election : Partur
Party	Candidate	Votes	%	±%
BJP	Babanrao Dattatray Yadav	41,515	30.43	▼14.68
INC	Gopalrao Govindrao Borade	28,110	20.61	▼9.58
Independent	Kadam Madhavrao Dagdoba	27,180	19.93	New
BSP	Prof. Thite Manikrao Kundlikrao	11,765	8.62	New
Independent	Jadhav Sawairam Kishanram	9,483	6.95	New
SP	Uttamrao Chatursing Rathod	5,730	4.20	New
Independent	Pandhre Tukaram Namdeo	4,787	3.51	New
BBM	Ansabai Shahu Rathod	3,839	2.81	New
Margin of victory		13,405	9.83	▼5.09
Turnout		136,409	67.70	▼2.06
Total valid votes		136,409		
Registered electors		201,504		▲18.15
BJP hold		Swing	▼14.68	

=== Assembly Election 1999 ===
1999 Maharashtra Legislative Assembly election : Partur
Party	Candidate	Votes	%	±%
BJP	Babanrao Dattatray Yadav	48,572	45.11	▲13.26
INC	A. Kadir A. Wahed Deshmukh	32,508	30.19	▼1.76
NCP	Akat Vaijinath Yadavrao	25,276	23.48	New
Independent	Khalapure Sampatrao Damodar	675	0.63	New
Margin of victory		16,064	14.92	▲14.82
Turnout		118,980	69.76	▼3.71
Total valid votes		107,671		
Registered electors		170,547		▲1.74
BJP gain from INC		Swing	▲13.16	

=== Assembly Election 1995 ===
1995 Maharashtra Legislative Assembly election : Partur
Party	Candidate	Votes	%	±%
INC	A. Kadir A. Wahed Deshmukh	37,912	31.95	▼3.40
BJP	Babanrao Dattatray Yadav	37,790	31.85	▲2.68
Independent	Akat Vaijanathrao Yadavrao	28,783	24.26	New
Independent	Khandare Raosaheb Manikrao	6,472	5.45	New
BBM	Kale Manikrao Tulshiram	4,648	3.92	New
Independent	Kakade Pralhadrao Patilbuwa	1,566	1.32	New
Margin of victory		122	0.10	▼6.08
Turnout		123,149	73.47	▲9.31
Total valid votes		118,663		
Registered electors		167,624		▲8.02
INC hold		Swing	▼3.40	

=== Assembly Election 1990 ===
1990 Maharashtra Legislative Assembly election : Partur
Party	Candidate	Votes	%	±%
INC	Akat Vaijanathrao Yadavrao	34,289	35.35	▲2.41
BJP	Yadav Digambar Dattatrayrao	28,296	29.17	New
Independent	Gore Bhujanmgrao Shankarao	18,089	18.65	New
JD	Jaid Bapurao Balaji	7,381	7.61	New
BSP	Rathod Shriram Sawairam	4,234	4.37	New
Independent	Adhav Laxmibai Bhivaraji	2,197	2.27	New
Doordarshi Party	Kharat Narayan Ganpatrao	1,195	1.23	New
Margin of victory		5,993	6.18	▼23.72
Turnout		99,566	64.16	▲2.87
Total valid votes		96,997		
Registered electors		155,184		▲25.90
INC gain from IC(S)		Swing	▼27.48	

=== Assembly Election 1985 ===
1985 Maharashtra Legislative Assembly election : Partur
Party	Candidate	Votes	%	±%
IC(S)	Akat Vaijanathrao Yadavrao	46,231	62.83	New
INC	Borade Bhagwanrao Daulatrao	24,234	32.94	New
Independent	More Kishanrao Paraji	1,395	1.90	New
Independent	Chavan Ankush Sakharam	1,086	1.48	New
Independent	Kharat Narayan Ganpatrao	631	0.86	New
Margin of victory		21,997	29.90	▼2.05
Turnout		75,550	61.29	▲11.32
Total valid votes		73,577		
Registered electors		123,262		▲12.00
IC(S) gain from INC(I)		Swing	▲1.33	

=== Assembly Election 1980 ===
1980 Maharashtra Legislative Assembly election : Partur
Party	Candidate	Votes	%	±%
INC(I)	Borade Ramprasadji Vithalrao	32,860	61.50	▲30.01
PWPI	Wayal Gangadhar Kadaji	15,787	29.54	▲12.54
BJP	Puri Sudhakar Jagganathrao	2,706	5.06	New
Independent	Mahadev Kaduji Sonone	1,809	3.39	New
Margin of victory		17,073	31.95	▲21.77
Turnout		54,991	49.97	▼13.26
Total valid votes		53,434		
Registered electors		110,056		▲8.74
INC(I) hold		Swing	▲30.01	

=== Assembly Election 1978 ===
1978 Maharashtra Legislative Assembly election : Partur
Party	Candidate	Votes	%	±%
INC(I)	Borade Ramprasadji Vithalrao	19,296	31.49	New
JP	Sarkate Indrajit Ganpatrao	13,057	21.31	New
PWPI	Barkule Haribhau Ramrao	10,418	17.00	▼47.60
INC	Jadhav Sawairam Kishanram	10,392	16.96	▼18.44
Independent	Khatib Nasiroddin Kutboddin	7,008	11.44	New
Independent	Chavan Bramhandand Sakharam	1,102	1.80	New
Margin of victory		6,239	10.18	▼19.02
Turnout		63,994	63.23	▲12.89
Total valid votes		61,273		
Registered electors		101,208		▲13.63
INC(I) gain from PWPI		Swing	▼33.11	

=== Assembly Election 1972 ===
1972 Maharashtra Legislative Assembly election : Partur
Party	Candidate	Votes	%	±%
PWPI	Barkule Haribhau Ramrao	27,431	64.60	▲34.97
INC	Yadao Ramrao Narayanrao	15,031	35.40	▼19.76
Margin of victory		12,400	29.20	▲3.67
Turnout		44,833	50.34	▲1.00
Total valid votes		42,462		
Registered electors		89,067		▲14.00
PWPI gain from INC		Swing	▲9.44	

=== Assembly Election 1967 ===
1967 Maharashtra Legislative Assembly election : Partur
Party	Candidate	Votes	%	±%
INC	R. N. Yadav	19,958	55.16	▲1.52
PWPI	G. G. Lipane	10,720	29.63	▼10.26
Independent	N. G. Ghare	2,376	6.57	New
Independent	P. Sayaji	1,794	4.96	New
Independent	Y. S. More	1,335	3.69	New
Margin of victory		9,238	25.53	▲11.78
Turnout		38,548	49.34	▲6.28
Total valid votes		36,183		
Registered electors		78,131		▲5.93
INC hold		Swing	▲1.52	

=== Assembly Election 1962 ===
1962 Maharashtra Legislative Assembly election : Partur
Party	Candidate	Votes	%	±%
INC	Bhagwanrao Daulatrao	16,032	53.64	▼7.42
PWPI	Ankushrao Venkatrao Ghare	11,923	39.89	▲7.74
Independent	Sakharam Waman	1,933	6.47	New
Margin of victory		4,109	13.75	▼15.16
Turnout		31,757	43.06	▲13.95
Total valid votes		29,888		
Registered electors		73,759		▲18.93
INC hold		Swing	▼7.42	

=== Assembly Election 1957 ===
1957 Bombay State Legislative Assembly election : Partur
Party	Candidate	Votes	%	±%
INC	Bhagwanrao Daulatrao	11,023	61.06	▲28.46
PWPI	Ankushrao S/o Venkatrao	5,804	32.15	▼16.76
Independent	Sakharam S/o Babooappa	1,225	6.79	New
Margin of victory		5,219	28.91	▲12.60
Turnout		18,052	29.11	▼0.70
Total valid votes		18,052		
Registered electors		62,018		▲9.57
INC gain from PWPI		Swing	▲12.15	

=== Assembly Election 1952 ===
1952 Hyderabad State Legislative Assembly election : Partur
Party	Candidate	Votes	%	±%
PWPI	Ankush Rao	8,253	48.91	New
INC	Syed Anisur Rehman	5,501	32.60	New
Independent	Bhim Rao Balaji	2,119	12.56	New
PDF	Vithal Rao	1,000	5.93	New
Margin of victory		2,752	16.31	
Turnout		16,873	29.81	
Total valid votes		16,873		
Registered electors		56,599		
PWPI win (new seat)				

== See also ==
- 2014 Maharashtra Legislative Assembly election
