= Jalgaon Rural Assembly constituency =

Constituency of the Maharashtra legislative assembly in India

Coordinates: 21.00°N 75.57°E

Jalgaon Rural
- Constituency No. 14 for the Maharashtra Legislative Assembly

Constituency details
- Country: India
- Region: Western India
- State: Maharashtra
- District: Jalgaon
- Lok Sabha constituency: Jalgaon
- Established: 2008
- Total electors: 337,865
- Reservation: None

Member of Legislative Assembly
- 15th Maharashtra Legislative Assembly
- Incumbent Gulab Raghunath Patil
- Party: SHS
- Alliance: NDA
- Elected year: 2024

Jalgaon Rural Assembly constituency is one of the eleven constituencies of the Maharashtra Vidhan Sabha located in the Jalgaon district.

== Overview ==
It is a part of the Jalgaon (Lok Sabha constituency) along with five other assembly constituencies, viz Jalgaon City, Erandol Assembly constituency, Amalner Assembly constituency, Chalisgaon and Pachora.

As per orders of Delimitation of Parliamentary and Assembly constituencies Order, 2008, No. 14 Jalgaon Rural Assembly constituency is composed of the following: 1. Jalgaon Tehsil (Part) Revenue Circle Kanalde, Asoda, Jalgaon, Nashirabad and Mhasawad 2. Dharangaon Tehsil of Jalgaon district.

== Members of Legislative Assembly ==
Year	Member	Party
Till 2009 : Constituency did not exist : See Jalgaon
2009	Gulabrao Deokar	Nationalist Congress Party
2014	Gulabrao Patil	Shiv Sena
2019	Gulabrao Patil	Shiv Sena
2024	Gulabrao Patil	Shiv Sena

== Election results ==
=== Assembly Election 2024 ===
2024 Maharashtra Legislative Assembly election : Jalgaon Rural
Party	Candidate	Votes	%	±%
SS	Gulab Raghunath Patil	143,408	61.37%	▲7.39
NCP-SP	Gulabrao Deokar	84,176	36.02%	New
NOTA	None of the Above	1,803	0.77%	▼0.44
MNS	Mukunda Ananda Rote	1,619	0.69%	▼0.65
VBA	Pravin Jagan Sapkale	1,435	0.61%	New
Margin of victory		59,232	25.35%	▲1.51
Turnout		2,35,469	69.69%	▲7.08
Total valid votes		2,33,666		
Registered electors		3,37,865		▲7.03
SS hold		Swing	▲7.39	

=== Assembly Election 2019 ===
2019 Maharashtra Legislative Assembly election : Jalgaon Rural
Party	Candidate	Votes	%	±%
SS	Gulab Raghunath Patil	105,795	53.98%	▲9.33
Independent	Chandrashekhar Prakash Attarde	59,066	30.14%	New
NCP	Pushpa Dnyaneshwar Mahajan	17,962	9.17%	▼18.82
Independent	Deshmukh Jitendra Baburao (Ravi Bhau)	5,830	2.97%	New
MNS	Mukunda Ananda Rote	2,635	1.34%	▲0.68
NOTA	None of the Above	2,382	1.22%	▲0.36
Independent	Pradip Bhimrao Motiraya	1,362	0.69%	New
Margin of victory		46,729	23.84%	▲7.17
Turnout		1,98,446	62.86%	▼3.45
Total valid votes		1,95,981		
Registered electors		3,15,672		▲9.94
SS hold		Swing	▲9.33	

=== Assembly Election 2014 ===
2014 Maharashtra Legislative Assembly election : Jalgaon Rural
Party	Candidate	Votes	%	±%
SS	Gulab Raghunath Patil	84,020	44.65%	▲2.85
NCP	Gulabrao Deokar	52,653	27.98%	▼16.67
BJP	P. C. Abasaheb Patil	44,011	23.39%	New
INC	D. G. Patil	3,968	2.11%	New
NOTA	None of the Above	1,608	0.85%	New
MNS	Mukunda Aannda Rote	1,256	0.67%	▼7.80
Margin of victory		31,367	16.67%	▲13.82
Turnout		1,89,911	66.14%	▲3.47
Total valid votes		1,88,154		
Registered electors		2,87,123		▲11.20
SS gain from NCP		Swing	▲0.00	

=== Assembly Election 2009 ===
2009 Maharashtra Legislative Assembly election : Jalgaon Rural
Party	Candidate	Votes	%	±%
NCP	Gulabrao Deokar	71,556	44.65%	New
SS	Gulab Raghunath Patil	66,994	41.81%	New
MNS	Lalit Vijay Kolhe	13,570	8.47%	New
BSP	Chandrakant Ankush Birhade	2,500	1.56%	New
Independent	Bhagwan Bhawlal Patil	2,431	1.52%	New
RJP	Firake Suresh Kacharu	1,847	1.15%	New
Lok Sangram	Amitkumar Shamrao Salunkhe	1,348	0.84%	New
Margin of victory		4,562	2.85%	
Turnout		1,60,388	62.12%	
Total valid votes		1,60,246		
Registered electors		2,58,199		
NCP win (new seat)				

== See also ==
- Jalgaon
