= Hatzor =

Kibbutz in southern Israel

Hatzor Ashdod: חצור אשדוד (Hebrew); حتسور أشدود (Arabic)
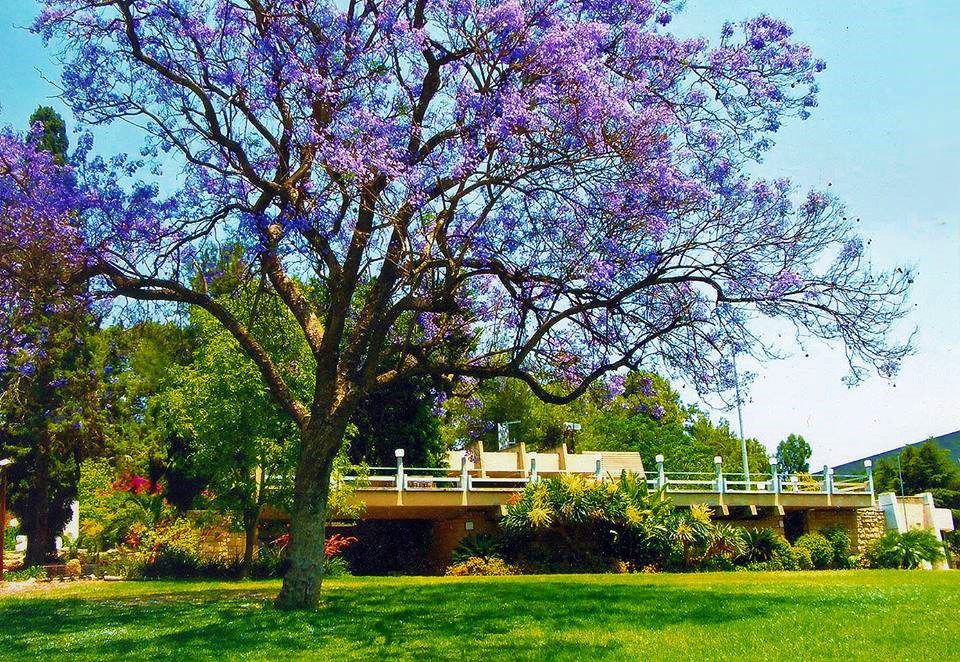

- Location within Ashkelon region of Israel
- Coordinates: 31°46′20″N 34°43′13″E
- Country: Israel
- District: Southern
- Subdistrict: Ashkelon
- Council: Be'er Tuvia
- Affiliation: Kibbutz Movement
- Founded: 17 June 1946
- Founder: Hashomer Hatzair
- Population (2024): 962
- Website: www.hatzor.org.il

Hatzor (Hebrew: חָצוֹר), officially Hatzor Ashdod, is a kibbutz in southern Israel. Located near Ashdod, it falls under the jurisdiction of Be'er Tuvia Regional Council. In 2024 it had a population of 962.

== Etymology ==
The kibbutz is named after a biblical city in the territory of the Tribe of Judah called Hatzor (Joshua 15:23). The extended name Hatzor Ashdod is to distinguish between this kibbutz and the Galilean town of Hatzor HaGlilit, although the kibbutz is best known as simply "Hatzor".

== History ==
=== Before the establishment of the kibbutz ===
The gar'in of the kibbutz was founded by a group of Hashomer Hatzair graduates from Mandatory Palestine who gathered at Mishmar HaEmek in 1936. It was named Kibbutz Eretz Israeli Gimel (Gimel is the third letter of the Hebrew Alphabet).

In 1937, the members left Mishmar HaEmek and moved to Rishon LeZion and settled in a camp used by another gar'in that left to establish the kibbutz of Sha'ar HaGolan. At Rishon LeZion, the members were occupied in manual work at orchards, factories, and road paving (for the Solel Boneh company) and established a carpentry shop and a Laundrette. In 1938, some members were sent for agricultural training in Beit Gan.

In 1941, the gari'n absorbed a group of pioneers from Bulgaria, graduates of Hashomer Hatzair and in the years 1945 and 1946, two groups from the United States and Canada, graduates of the movement as well. On 13 May 1943, a group of the gar'in members founded Gvulot, one of the three lookouts, the first Jewish settlements in the Negev. The members settled in Gvulot for three years where they worked the lands of the Jewish National Fund and asked to remain there as a permanent settlement. In 1946, Jewish establishments decided to give the land to members of kibbutz Nirim and in return the members of Kibbutz Eretz Israeli Gimel were given lands near Yasur.

=== After the establishment of the kibbutz ===
On 17 June 1946, some of the members arrived at the point and established the kibbutz, which is when they renamed themselves "Hatzor". The location chosen for the kibbutz was a barren hill, with four Arab villages surrounding it and a British airbase. Initially, the residents lived in tents and built two sheds used as a dining room and a barrack. In January 1947, the residents began building permanent buildings, and the rest of the members of the gar'in gradually arrived at the kibbutz from Rishon LeZion until all of them arrived in November 1947.

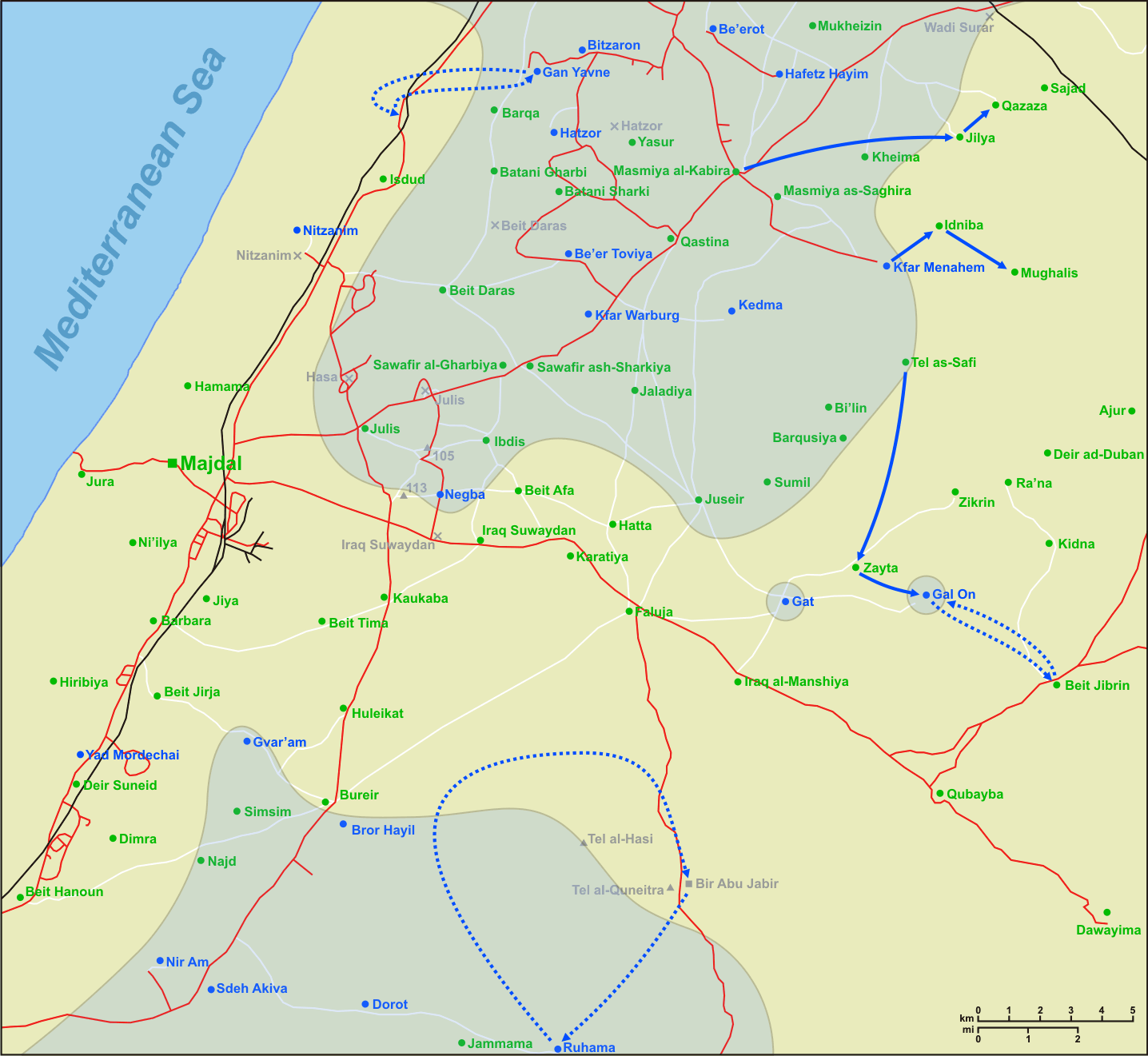
Frontlines in the area of Hatzor, 16–17 July 1948

During the 1947–1948 Civil War in Mandatory Palestine, transportation was limited and was only carried out with armored vehicles, and fieldwork was done under guards. Following the Israeli Declaration of Independence on 14 May 1948, the army of Egypt invaded the former territory of Mandatory Palestine and advanced along the coastline until it reached Ad Halom bridge. From the end of May till October 1948, the kibbutz was near the front lines of the Egyptian Army and was repeatedly shelled by artillery fire. Many members of the kibbutz were recruited to the Israel Defense Forces and participated in the Battles of Negba. The children, as well as livestock, were evacuated to Holon, while the members who stayed in the kibbutz hid in trenches and shelters. Following Operation Yoav in October, the Egyptians withdrew, and the kibbutz returned to routine life.

The surrounding Arab villages were depopulated, and their residents became refugees in the Gaza Strip. Part of the land in the area was leased to the kibbutz. In the 1950s, another group of Hashomer Hatzair members from France and Switzerland also joined the kibbutz.

Like other kibbutzim founded by Hashomer Hatzair members, Hatzor was affiliated with the Kibbutz Artzi movement, which in the 1990s merged into the Kibbutz Movement.

Since the 1990s, the Kibbutz has undergone changes towards privatization and abandoned many of its original collective habits. As a result, more than 100 new members were admitted within 7 years. A new neighborhood of 44 families, populated by those new members, was completed in the spring of 2014.

== See also ==
- Hatzor Airbase
