= Green Cross Brazil =

Part of Green Cross International Network

Green Cross Brazil is part of Green Cross International network. That was founded by former Soviet Union President and Nobel Peace Prize laureate Mikhail Gorbachev in 1993, building upon the work started by the 1992 Earth Summit in Rio de Janeiro, Brazil.

Green Cross Brazil is an independent non-profit and non-governmental environmental organisation (NGO) working to address the inter-connected global challenges of security, poverty eradication and environmental degradation through a combination of advocacy and local projects. The organisation has projects in partnerships with the Brazilian Government, Sicoob Cooperative Bank, Microsoft, Netafim, Sebrae and Giorgio Armani.

In 2016, Green Cross Brazil started implementing the Water for Peace Programme, part of Giorgio Armani’s Acqua for Life Project. The project target a subdistrict of Mariana, which still suffers the catastrophic consequences of the Mariana dam disaster.

With the support of Giorgio Armani, Green Cross is installing rainwater harvesting systems in two of the worst-affected municipalities. The collected water is used for drinking, hygiene and latrines, as well as to irrigate small vegetable gardens at the schools. Green Cross Brazil and its partners are also engaged with local communities, and holding training workshops for teachers on maintenance of water systems and sustainable water practices.
