= Simcha Blass =

Polish-Israeli engineer and inventor (1897-1982)

Simcha Blass (Hebrew: שמחה בלאס; November 27, 1897 – July 18, 1982) was a Polish-Israeli engineer and inventor who developed the modern drip irrigation system with his son Yeshayahu.

== Biography ==
Simcha Blass was born in Warsaw, Poland, which was then part of the Russian Empire, to an Orthodox Jewish family. He was active in the Jewish self-defense units organized in Warsaw to defend Jews during the end of World War I. His engineering studies in Warsaw were interrupted by the Polish-Soviet War and completed after that war. During the war, he was recruited to the Polish Army, where he invented for the Polish Air Force a meteorological appliance, measuring the intensity and direction of winds.

Later, he invented, patented and developed an operative wheat planting machine, which was tested and sold in Europe and in Palestine (1927), but proved uneconomical. The main motivation for this invention was Zionism (i.e. enabling more Jews to settle in Palestine). Zionism was the main drive for most of his other activities in adult life.

== Water engineering in the Yishuv of Palestine and State of Israel ==
During the years 1930–1948 he was the most known water engineer in the Yishuv (Jewish community) of Palestine. He planned the first modern aqueduct in the Jordan Valley. He was the chief engineer and one of the founders (with Levi Eshkol and Pinchas Sapir) of Mekorot water company (established 1937, now Israel's national water company).

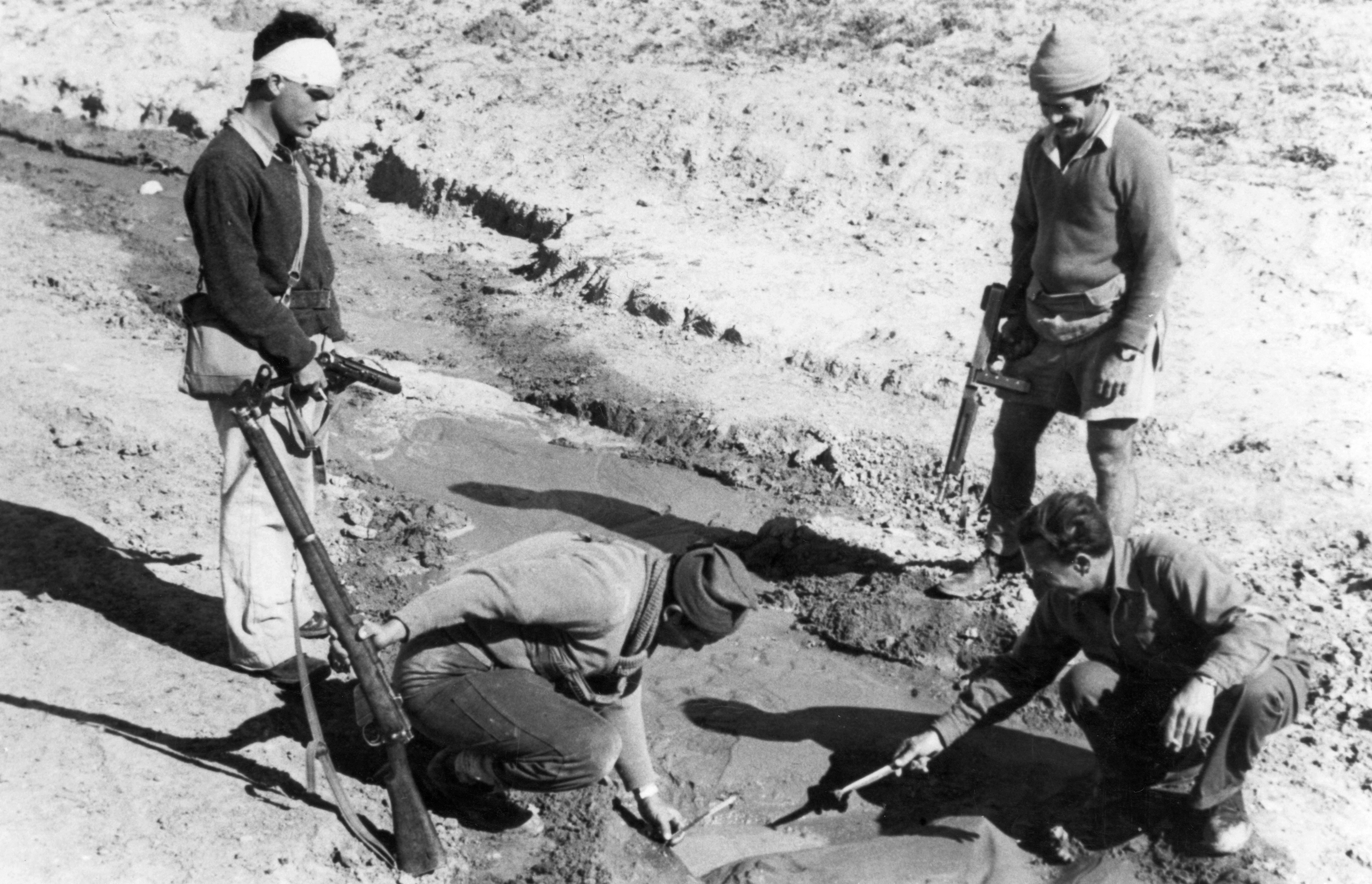
checking the sabotaged water pipeline to the Negev isolated settlements,1948

Later, in 1946, he planned the first water pipeline to the Negev, the pipes for which had been used in London during the Blitz for extinguishing fire and bought by Blass after World War II. This pipeline enabled the establishment of 11 new Jewish settlements in the Negev towards the end of the British Mandate for Palestine, on a single evening (Yom Kippur night) in 1946; it also served Bedouin Arabs. The Jewish settlements in the Negev had a major role influencing the United Nations Special Committee on Palestine (UNSCOP) to include most of the Negev within the boundaries of the recommended Jewish state.

In 1948 to 1956 Blass was the founder and director of the governmental water institutions of the newly established State of Israel, the official councillor of the government on water affairs and head of planners of the Israeli National Water Carrier.

Blass wrote the chapter "Development of Water Resources in Palestine" in Encyclopaedia Hebraica.

== Drip irrigation ==
In the early 1930s, a farmer drew his attention to a big tree, growing in his backyard "without water". After digging below the apparently dry surface, Simcha Blass discovered why: water from a leaking coupling was causing a small wet area on the surface, while an expanding onion-shaped area of underground water was reaching the roots of this particular tree—and not the others. This sight of tiny drops penetrating the soil causing the growth of a giant tree provided the catalyst for Blass's invention. Blass started thinking about using drip irrigation and his experiments that followed led Blass to create an irrigation device that used friction and water pressure loss to leak drops of water at regular intervals. Recognizing the high potential of his discovery, he began to look for ways to turn his idea into a product.

In the late 1950s, with the advent of modern plastics during and after World War II, he took a major step towards implementing his idea. After leaving government service in 1956 he reopened his private engineering office and worked with his son Yeshayahu on the drip irrigation idea. The main aspect of the new invention was to release water through larger and longer passageways (rather than tiny holes) by using friction to slow water inside a plastic emitter. Larger passageways prevented the blocking of tiny holes by very small particles. The first experimental system of this type was established in 1959. In the early 1960s, Blass developed and patented this method and the new dripper was the first practical surface drip irrigation emitter.

During the years 1960 to 1965 Blass developed the drip-irrigation systems and sold them inside Israel and abroad. In 1965 he contacted Arie Bahir who was in charge of the industry in the kibbutzim in order to find a kibbutz to give him the task of further developing this new enterprise. Out of some suggestions, Blass chose kibbutz Hazerim in the Negev.

=== Online dripper system ===
For the desert-based Kibbutz Hatzerim looking to expand its activities beyond agriculture, Simcha Blass's invention opened up a world of possibilities. Blass and his son Yeshayahu and Kibbutz Hatzerim signed a contract (on August 10, 1965) establishing Netafim Irrigation Company (80% Kibbutz Hatzerim and 20% Blass). Production began in 1966. With Blass's original narrow spaghetti tube model and later models as the starting point, Netafim engineers working with Blass, developed the online dripper—indeed allowing the desert to bloom.

== Published works ==
- Water resources in Israel (Hebrew: אוצרות המים בארץ ישראל), Mekorot, May 1944
- Water in Strife and Action (Hebrew: מי מריבה ומעש), Massada, 1973 (autobiography)
