= 11 points in the Negev =

1946 Jewish Agency settlement effort

The 11 Points

—	settlements existing to this day
—	settlement dismantled as part of Israeli disengagement from Gaza

11 points in the Negev (Hebrew: 11 הנקודות or Hebrew: אחת-עשרה הנקודות, Achat-Esre HaNekudot) refers to a Jewish Agency plan to establish eleven settlements in the Negev in 1946 prior to the partition of Palestine and the establishment of the State of Israel.

== History ==
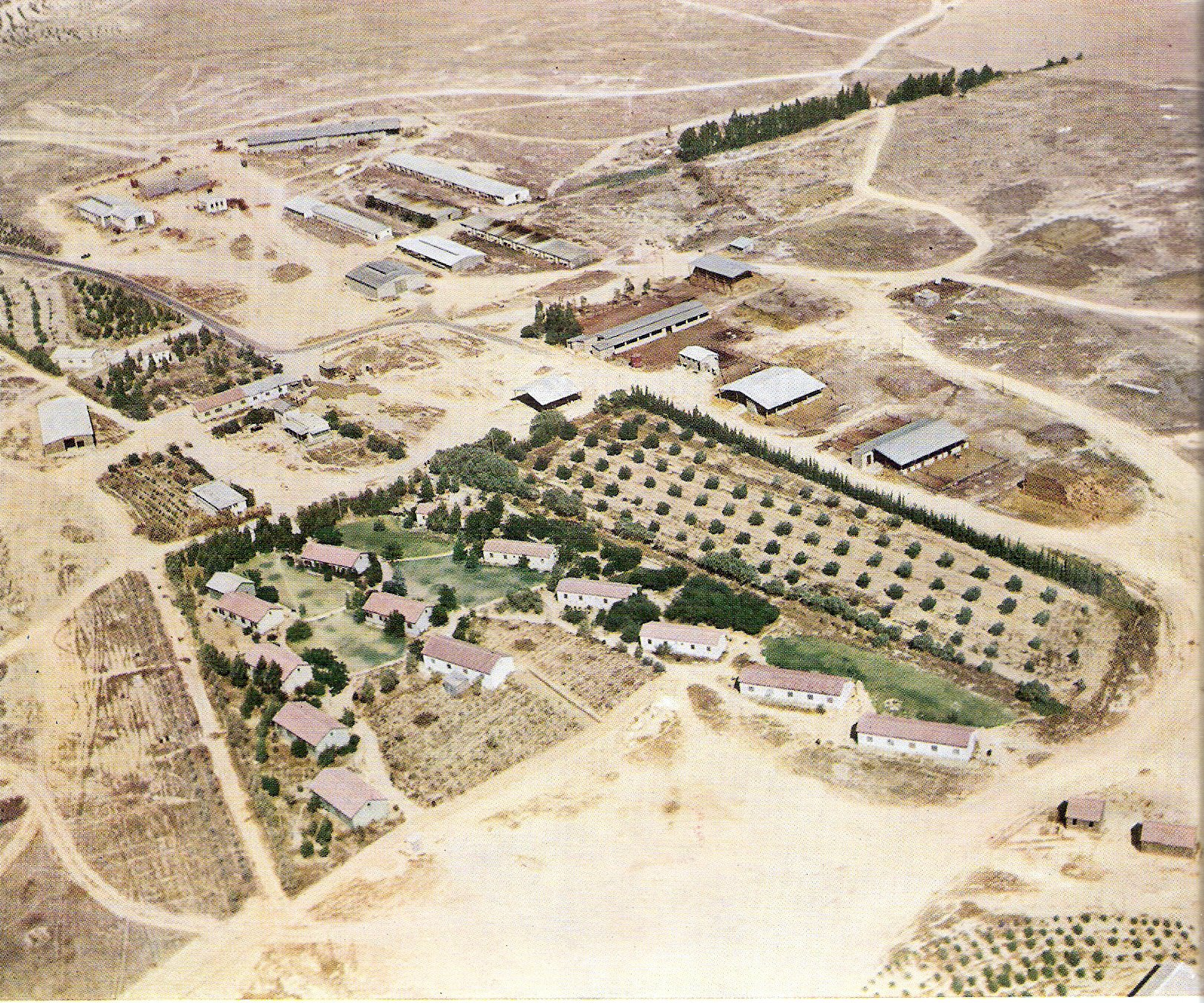
Aerial view of Hatzerim, 1958

A plan to establish eleven "points" of Jewish settlement in the Negev was devised to assure a Jewish presence in the area prior to the partition of Palestine. That followed the publication of the Morrison-Grady Plan, a partition proposal in which the Negev was to be part of an Arab state.

Together, the Jewish National Fund, the Jewish Agency, the Haganah and the Mekorot water company launched a drive to settle the Negev and hopefully to have the Negev included as part of a Jewish state. Chief engineer of the Mekorot Simcha Blass, who later became known as the inventor of the drip irrigation system, designed a water pipeline to the northern Negev.

On the night of October 5–6, 1946, after the Yom Kippur fast, the settlers, including members of Kibbutz Ruhama and Gvulot, set up camp at eleven pre-determined locations in the Negev. The eleven settlements were (in alphabetic order):

- Be'eri
- Gal On
- Hatzerim
- Kedma
- Kfar Darom
- Mishmar HaNegev
- Nevatim
- Nirim
- Shoval
- Tkuma
- Urim

== Legacy and commemoration ==
Today a museum celebrating the eleven points is located in Revivim. In 1996 Israel Post released a stamp celebrating the fiftieth anniversary of their settlement.

== See also ==
- Three lookouts
- Blueprint Negev
