= Nir (name) =

Nir is a male given name of Hebrew origin which means "plowed field". It is also used as a Hebraized surname. Examples of people with that name:

== Given name ==
- Nir Abergel (born 1990), Israeli footballer
- Nir Alon (born 1964), Israeli sculptor and an installation artist
- Nir Baram (born 1976), Israeli author
- Nir Barkat (born 1959), Israeli businessman, entrepreneur, philanthropist, and politician
- Nir Barzilai (born 1955), biologist
- Nir Berkovic (born 1982), former Israeli footballer
- Nir Bitton (born 1991), Israeli professional footballer
- Nir Cohen (born 1981), Israeli retired basketball player
- Nir Davidovich (born 1976), former Israeli goalkeeper
- Nir Felder (born 1982), American jazz guitarist, composer, and songwriter
- Nir Friedman (born 1967), Israeli professor
- Nir Hod (born 1970), Israeli artist based in New York
- Nir Jacob Kaplan (born 1989), Israeli actor, entertainer, and a radio presenter
- Nir Kabaretti (born 1968), Israeli orchestra conductor
- Nir Klinger (born 1966), Israeli football coach and former footballer
- Nir Lax (born 1994), Israeli footballer
- Nir Levine (born 1962), Israeli footballer and football manager
- Nir Malhi (born 1955), Israeli martial arts teacher, founder of Cheng Ming Israel
- Nir Nachum (born 1983), Israeli football player
- Nir Nakav (born 1972), Israeli drummer
- Nir Rosen (born 1977), American journalist and chronicler
- Nir Seroussi (born 1970), music executive, producer, and songwriter
- Nir Shavit, Israeli computer scientist
- Nir Shaviv (born 1972), Israeli‐American physics professor
- Nir Shental (born 1969), Israeli Olympic competitive sailor
- Nir Sivilia (born 1975), former Israeli footballer
- Nir Tibor (born 1993), known as Dennis Lloyd, Israeli musician, producer, and songwriter
- Nir Welgreen (born 1976), former professional tennis player from Israel
- Nir Yaniv (born 1972), Israeli musician, author and editor
- Nir Yusim (born 1978), Israeli badminton player
- Nir Zidkyahu (born 1967), studio-session drummer

== Surname ==
- Itzhak Nir (born 1940), Israeli Olympic competitive sailor
- Shlomit Nir (born 1952), Israeli Olympic swimmer

== See also ==
- Nia (given name)
- NIR (disambiguation)
