= Beit Eshel =

Defunct Jewish settlement in Mandatory Palestine

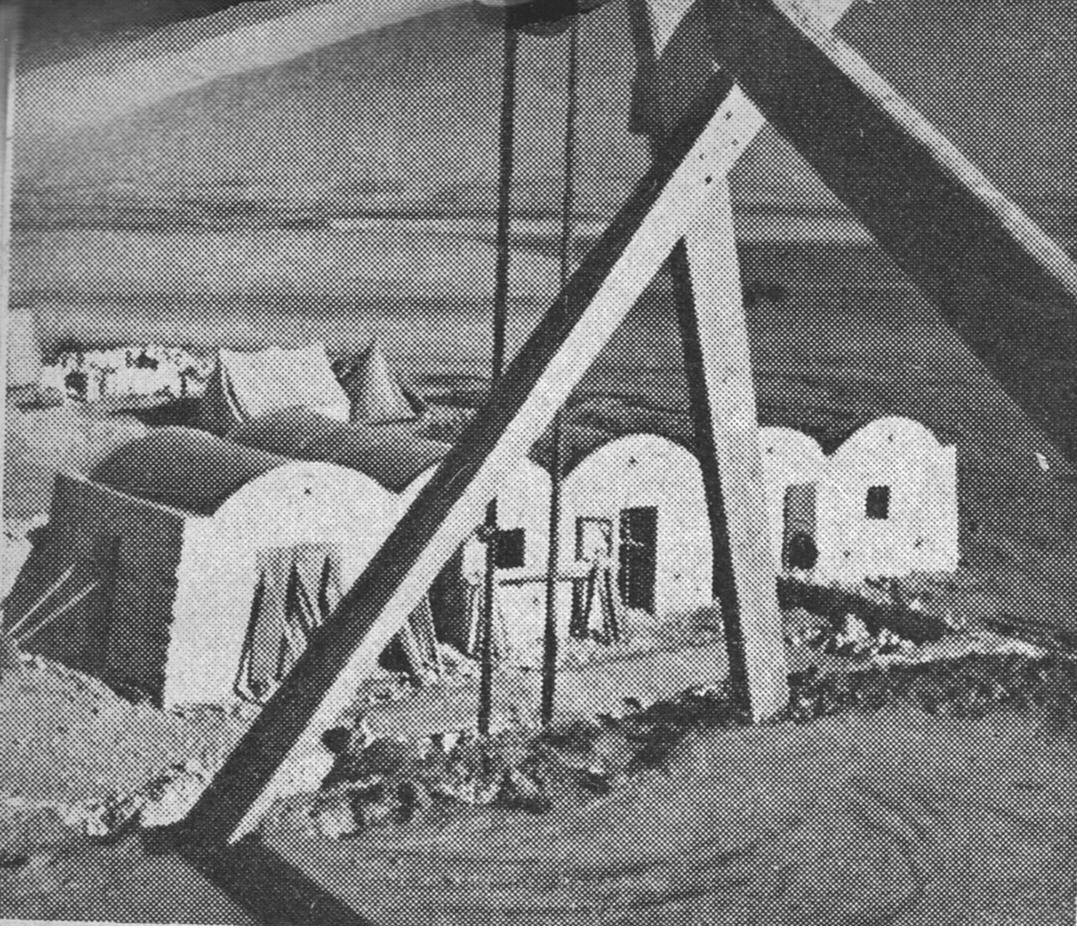

- Location within Mandatory Palestine
- Coordinates: 31°14′06″N 34°48′46.48″E
- Country: Mandatory Palestine
- Established: 1943

Beit Eshel (Hebrew: בֵּית אֵשֶׁל) was a Jewish settlement established in the Negev desert in Mandate Palestine in 1943 as one of the "three lookouts" in the northern Negev, alongside Revivim and Gvulot. It was located two kilometres southeast of Beersheba.

== Name ==
According to the Jewish National Fund, the name means "House of the Tamarisk" and refers to the tamarisks planted by the patriarch Abraham at Beersheba.

== History ==
The pioneers of Beit Eshel were Holocaust survivors from Austria, Czechoslovakia, and Germany. As one of three outposts, the residents of Beit Eshel were tasked with checking the viability of agriculture in the area based on climate analysis, availability of water, etc. In 1947 the village had a population of over 100.

In May 1948, when Egypt invaded Israel in the early stages of the 1948 Arab–Israeli War, Beit Eshel was cut off from Jewish territory and was shelled heavily by the Egyptians. According to the Haganah, this attack was repulsed. 8 men and women were killed, many buildings destroyed or damaged, and the Egyptians continued to fire at the village sporadically. In October 1948, with the IDF capture of the city of Beersheba, Beit Eshel was liberated. However, the settlers of Beit Eshel couldn't cope with the large scale destruction, decided to abandon the settlement and to establish a new moshav named HaYogev in the Jezreel Valley.

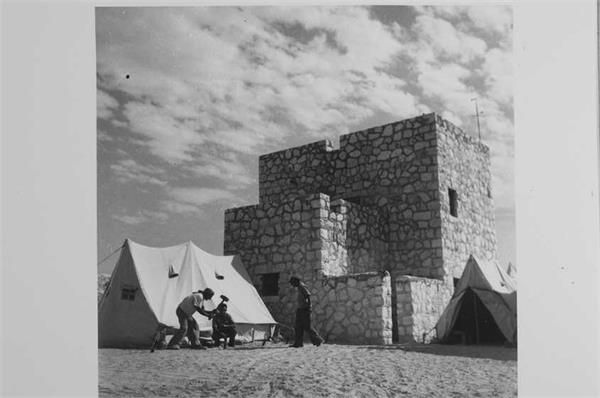
Beit Eshel 1945

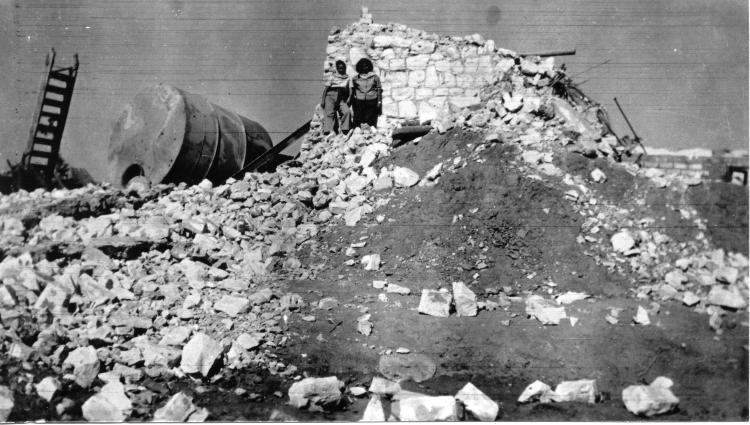
Beit Eshel after recapture by the Israeli army. 1948

=== Heritage site ===
In 1960, a group of Beersheva residents established a volunteer society to preserve Beit Eshel as a national heritage site.

== Archaeology ==
Excavations at Beit Eshel in 2003 by a joint team of the Israel Antiquities Authority and the Archaeological Division of Ben Gurion University of the Negev unearthed Ghassulian flint sickle blades from the fifth millennium BCE, suggesting that the site was a Ghassulian (Chalcolithic) flint workshop.

== See also ==
- 11 points in the Negev, Zionist settlement project
