= NIR =

NIR or Nir may refer to:

== Science and technology ==
- Near-infrared, a region within the infrared part of the electromagnetic radiation spectrum
- Near-infrared spectroscopy, a spectroscopic method that uses the near-infrared region (from 780 nm to 2500 nm).
- National Identity Register, a former UK database
- National Internet registry, which coordinates IP address and other resource allocation
- NIR, proposed variation of the SECAM colour television system in the Soviet Union
- Numéro d'inscription au répertoire national d'identification des personnes and numéro d'inscription au répertoire, national identity numbers; see INSEE code

== Places ==
- Nir, Iran (disambiguation), several places in Iran
- Negros Island Region, one of the 18 regions of the Philippines
- Nigeria, UNDP country code
- Northern Ireland (FIFA country code: NIR, ISO 3166 code: GB-NIR), a part of the United Kingdom
- Ness Islands Railway, a miniature railway in Scotland
- Nainpur Junction railway station (station code: NIR), Madhya Pradesh, India

== Other uses ==
- Nir (name), a Hebrew given name and surname
- Northern Ireland Railways, the railway operator in Northern Ireland
- Nordmøre Interkommunale Renovasjonsselskap, a Norwegian waste management agency
- Rate of natural increase, a demographic metric of population increase
- Nationaal Instituut voor de Radio-Omroep, Dutch name of Belgium's National Institute of Radio Broadcasting (1930-1960)

== See also ==
- NIRS (disambiguation)
