= Nir Malhi =

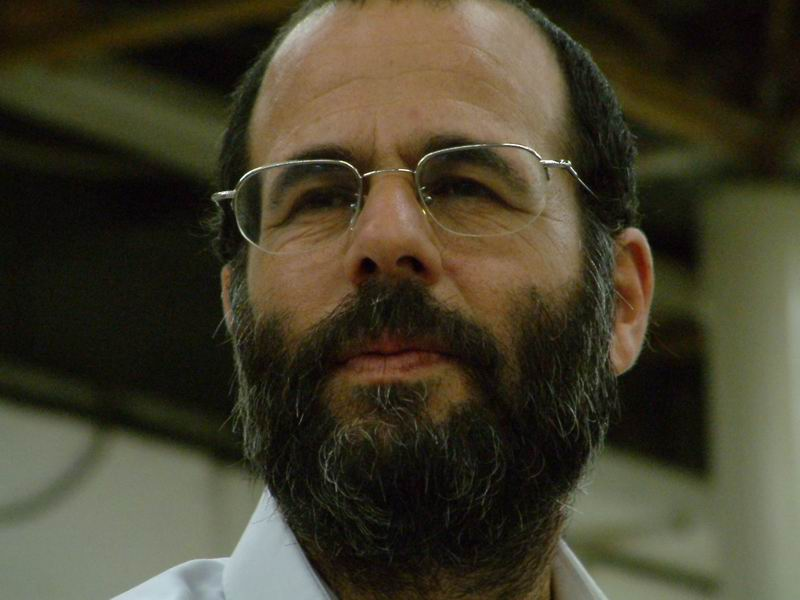
Image of Nir Malhi

Nir Malhi (Hebrew: ניר מלחי; born 1955 in kibbutz Hatzerim) is an Israeli martial arts teacher, founder of Cheng Ming Israel.

Malhi served in Shayetet 13, the Israeli naval commando unit. He began his study of Karate in an early age and after his army service he went abroad to study it further. He practiced Karate, Kendo and Tai Chi, and reached the high levels in all of them. In 1980 while living in Japan, Malhi became a student of Wang Fulai who in turn had been a student of Wang Shujin.

On returning to Israel, Malhi established Cheng Ming Israel (the Israeli Tai Chi Center). Today this school has hundreds of students and many branches all over Israel.

Malhi was diagnosed with severe cancer in 2002, likely as a result of diving in the polluted Kishon River during his military service. At the time, the doctors gave him only several months to live.

The movie As a Great River Flows follows Malhi through his unique journey. The movie won the prize for best documentary in the Haifa International Film Festival in 2005.

In 2016 the book Martial Art: Conversations with Master Nir Malhi (by Omer Berkman) was published, consists of eight conversations with various people, among them Eli Cohen, Rony Kluger and Ami Ayalon.
