= Wavin =

Company in Zwolle, Netherlands

- Industry: Manufacturing
- Founded: 1955
- Headquarters: Schiphol, Netherlands
- Key people: Freek Crum (President Building & Infrastructure (Wavin)
- Products: Water and Indoor Climate Solutions
- Revenue: €1.327 billion (2011)
- Operating income: €35.5 million (2011)
- Net income: €18.0 million (2011)
- Number of employees: 11,000 (2025)
- Parent: Orbia
- Website: www.wavin.com

Wavin B.V. is a global manufacturer of plastic pipes and fittings, mainly for drainage and water supply purposes. The company was officially founded in the Netherlands on 5 August 1955, its name deriving from water and vinyl chloride. The company provides plastic pipe systems and products for tap water, surface heating and cooling, soil and waste, rain water, distribution of drinking water and gas and telecom applications.

The company is headquartered in Schiphol, Netherlands, serving over 90 countries through a global sales and distribution network.

Due to the common use of Wavin products, the name has become genericised in some parts of Ireland to refer to any manufacturer of orange-coloured drainpipes. The company operates in three locations in Ireland, with the main manufacturing and distribution plant in Balbriggan, North County Dublin, and additional offices in Lisburn and Cork.

Wavin's own Technology and Innovation Centre (Wavin T&I), employs more than 50 people to develop new products and systems with local Wavin companies. Products for the European market include the Wavin Tigris press-fitting, the Sentio heating and cooling controls, Tegra manholes and inspection chambers and the SiTech+ low noise in-house soil and waste drainage system. In 2012, Wavin was acquired by Orbia (previously Mexichem), a Mexican international company, expanding Mexichem's operations in 22 European countries.
