= Rivulis =

Manufacturer of irrigation systems

- Type: Private company
- Industry: Drip irrigation systems
- Founded: 1966
- Headquarters: Singapore
- Key people: Eran Ossmy (President)
- Owner: Temasek Holdings (78%), Jain Irrigation Systems (22%)
- Number of employees: 2,000
- Website: www.rivulis.com

Rivulis is a global manufacturer and provider of complete micro and drip irrigation systems and solutions for seasonal horticulture, orchards, vineyards, row crops, SDI and greenhouse, soilless, hydroponic applications. Rivulis is headquartered in Singapore and is majority-owned by Temasek.

With origins since the 1930s, the company represents an integration of five industry pioneers and veterans: Plastro, T-Systems, Roberts Irrigation, Eurodrip and NaanDanJain. It has 3,300 business partners worldwide, and a wholesale retail and vast dealer network in over 120 countries.

The company operates 25 factories worldwide and has nearly 3,000 employees. Rivulis has multiple global design centers and 3 R&D centers in agricultural hotspots of Israel, California, and Greece.

== History ==
In 2006, Plastro Irrigation (founded in 1966), Roberts Irrigation (founded in 1969), T-Systems (founded in 1977) were acquired by John Deere to form its micro and drip irrigation business, John Deere Water.

In 2014, FIMI Opportunity Funds acquired John Deere Water, and changed the name to Rivulis Irrigation. In 2015, Jaya Hind Industries invested in Rivulis Irrigation and founded the joint venture in India,

In 2016, Rivulis acquired Agam Advanced Agriculture and created Manna Irrigation Intelligence, its precision agriculture subsidiary. In 2017, Rivulis bought Eurodrip, a vetern micro and drip irrigation provider (founded in 1979), and become world's second largest irrigation systems manufacturer. In 2019, Rivulis and Polyplastic founded a Joint venture in Russia.

In 2020, Temasek Holdings acquired a majority stake in Rivulis. In June 2022, Rivulis acquired the international subsidiaries of Jain Irrigation including NaanDanJain and Jain became a minority shareholder while Temasek retained majority holding.

In March 2024, Rivulis sold its smart irrigation management subsidiary, ETWater to Husqvarna Group for an undisclosed amount.

In July 2024, Rivulis and Phytech, a company that develops plant-based farming applications, announced a strategic partnership. Rivulis’ ag-tech subsidiary, Manna operations were merged into Phytech and Rivulis became a shareholder.

== Products ==
- Rivulis Defend
- Rivulis T-Tape – integrated emitter.
- Rivulis Ro-Drip – molded emitter drip lines.
- Rivulis H6000 PE Layflat – layflat with pre-installed outlets.
- D5000 CX: Pressure compensated (PC) drip line with copper oxide blended into each dripper to reduce root intrusion.
- Rivulis ReelView: Cloud-based crop and field monitoring application.
