= Orbia =

American Company

Orbia Advance Corporation, S.A.B. de C.V.
- Company type: Sociedad Anónima Bursátil de Capital Variable
- Traded as: BMV: ORBIA
- Industry: Utilities
- Founded: 1953; 73 years ago
- Headquarters: Av.Paseo de la Reforma, Col. Cuauhtémoc, Mexico City, Mexico
- Key people: Juan Pablo del Valle Perochena (chairman); Sameer Bharadwaj (CEO)
- Products: Utilities
- Brands: Netafim, Wavin, Koura, Dura-Line, Vestolit, Alphagary, Amanco, PAVCO, Plastigama, Klea, Zephex
- Revenue: ▲US$ 6.4 billion (2020)
- Net income: ▲US$ EBITDA 1.7 billion (2020)
- Number of employees: 22,000(2019)
- Website: www.orbia.com

Orbia (previously Mexichem) is a company providing specialty products and methodologies in the agriculture, building and infrastructure, fluorinated solutions, polymer solutions, and data communications sectors. It was founded in 1953 and has headquarters in Mexico City.

== History ==
In 1953 – Cables Mexicanos S.A. was founded by a group of Mexican and American investors, to sell high-carbon steel wire ropes in Mexico. In the 60s Cables Mexicanos S.A. changed its name to Aceros Camesa. In 1978 – A control company was created "Grupo Industrial Camesa". It became a publicly-held company, listed on Mexican Stock Exchange. 1997 – Grupo Empresarial Privado Mexicano (GEPM), a company held by the del Valle Family, acquired Grupo Industrial Camesa.

=== Globalization, 2006–2013 ===
- 2011 – Mexichem acquired Alphagary Group, a producer of PVC, TPE, and TPO compounds in the United States and the United Kingdom.
- 2012 – Mexichem acquires Wavin, a European supplier of plastic pipes, expanding Mexichem's water management portfolio with acquired operations in 22 European countries.

=== Recent history, 2014–2018 ===
- 2017 – Mexichem acquired an 80% stake in Netafim, a precision irrigation approaches provider. This expanded the company's reach into the Middle East, Africa, and Asia.

=== Change of name ===
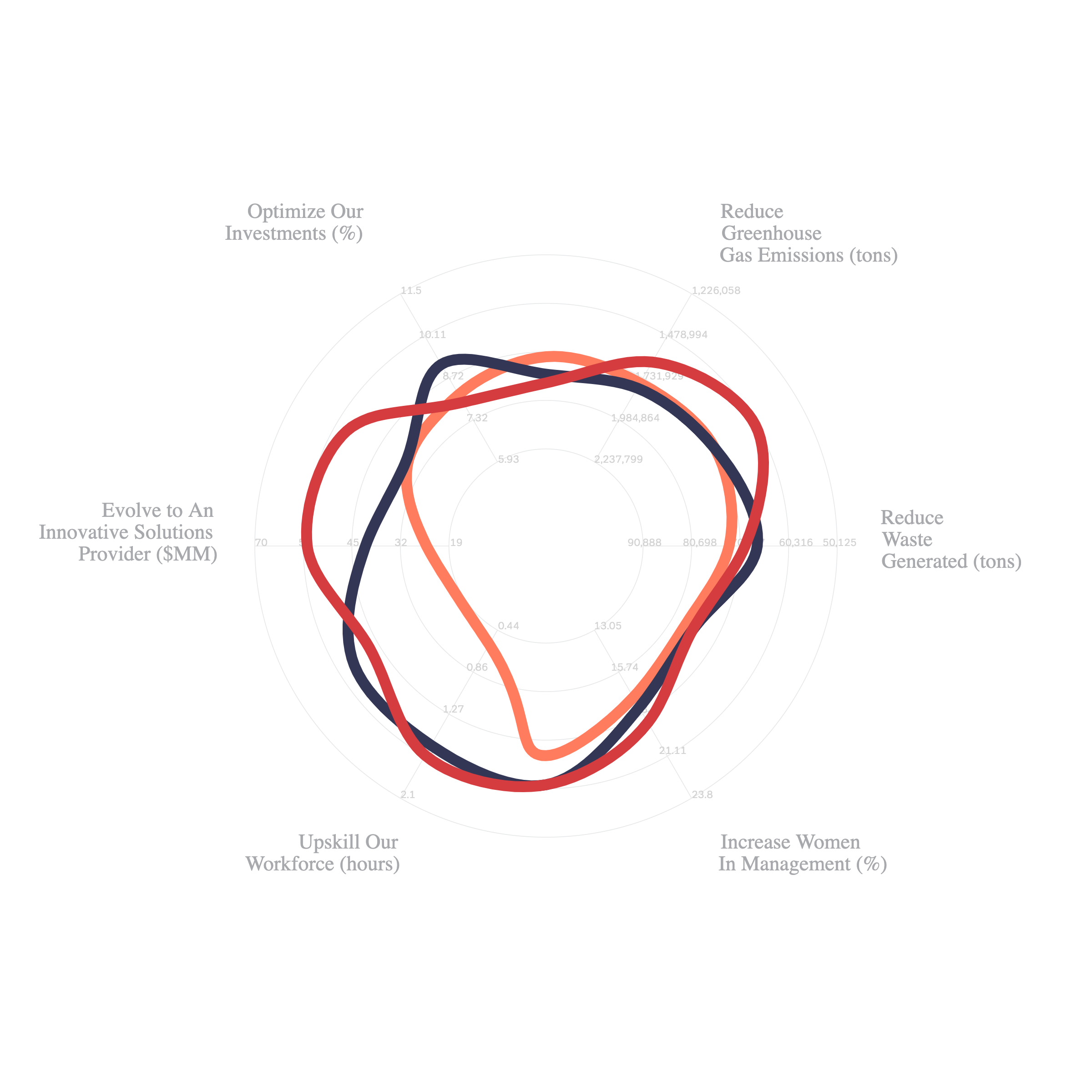
Orbia logo

Mexichem was rebranded in 2019 as Orbia, from the Latin word for a sphere and Bia, an ancient Greek personification of the concept of "force."
