= NIRS =

NIRS may refer to:

== Organizations ==
- National Indigenous Radio Service, Australia
- National Institute on Retirement Security, a research institute in the US
- National Institute of Radiological Sciences, a research institute in Japan
- Nuclear Information and Resource Service, an anti-nuclear group in the US

== Other uses ==
- Near-infrared spectroscopy

== See also ==
- NIR (disambiguation)
