= Gvulot =

Kibbutz in southern Israel

Gvulot: גְּבוּלוֹת (Hebrew)
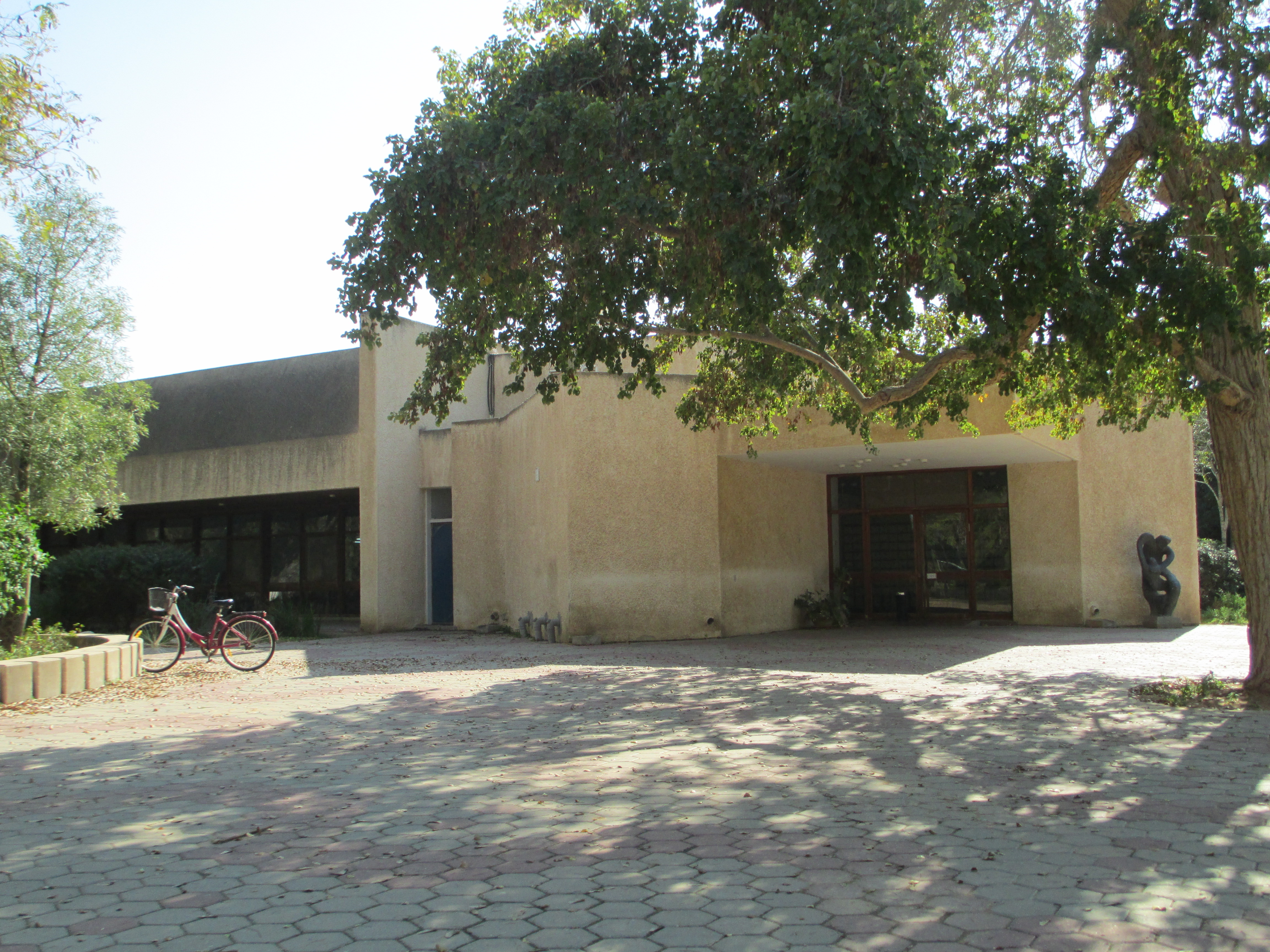

- Location within Northwest Negev region of Israel
- Coordinates: 31°12′37″N 34°27′58″E
- Country: Israel
- District: Southern
- Subdistrict: Beersheba
- Council: Eshkol
- Affiliation: Kibbutz Movement
- Founded: 12 May 1943
- Founder: Romanian and Turkish Jews
- Population (2024): 430
- Website: www.gvulot.org

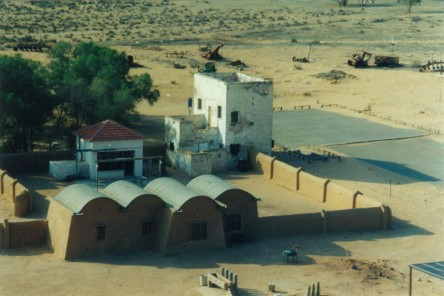
Mitzpe Gvulot

Gvulot (Hebrew: גְּבוּלוֹת, lit. 'Borders') is a kibbutz in southern Israel. Located in the north-western Negev desert, it falls under the jurisdiction of Eshkol Regional Council. In 2024 it had a population of 430. Gvulot is located about 120 m above sea level.

== History ==
The village was established on land owned by the Jewish National Fund (JNF) on 12 May 1943 by immigrants from Romania and Turkey, who were members of the "Kibbutz Eretz Israel Gimel" group of Hashomer Hatzair, with financial assistance from Keren Hayesod. Initially named Mitzpe Gvulot (Hebrew: מִצְפֶּה גְּבוּלוֹת, lit. 'Borders lookout'), it was the first of the three lookouts, the others being Beit Eshel and Revivim. It was the second modern Jewish settlement in the Negev and the first in the Gaza area. Its purpose was to guard JNF land, as well as to research the soil and climate of the region and assess their suitability for agriculture.

It was recognised as a kibbutz in 1946. Before the 1948 Arab–Israeli War it was divided into two—a small cluster of families in its post-war location, and the rest in the nearby military base. During the war, the base served the 8th Brigade. After the war, in 1949, all the residents moved to Gvulot's present location, about 1.5 km south of the base.

Duran Duran lead singer Simon Le Bon worked on Kibbutz Gvulot. While here he wrote early lyrics for "Careless Memories", “The Chauffeur”, "Sound of Thunder", "Tel Aviv".

An anareboic waste plant is being built between Gvulot and Tzeelim.

== See also ==
- 11 points in the Negev, Zionist settlement project
