= Nir, Iran =

Nir (Persian: نير) in Iran may refer to:

- Nir, Ardabil, a city in Ardabil Province, Iran
- Nir, Isfahan, a village in Isfahan Province, Iran
- Nir, Yazd, a city in Yazd Province, Iran
- Nir County, a subdivision of Ardabil Province, Iran
- Nir District, a subdivision of Taft County, Yazd Province, Iran
