= Rony Kluger =

Israeli karateka and teacher

- Born: 3rd of January, 1952 [Hungary]
- Native name: רוני קלוגר
- Style: Okinawan Gōjū-ryū Karate Do and Yamanni Ryu Kobudo.
- Rank: Hanshi, 9th degree (Ku Dan) in Karate
- Years active: 1966–present

Other information
- Occupation: Martial Artist (Budoka), Teacher, lecturer and Educator
- Children: 2 (Noa Kluger, Gilad Kluger)
- Website: Official website of Rony Kluger's dojo

Rony Kluger (Hebrew: רוני קלוגר; born 1952 in Budapest) is an Israeli budoka, teacher, lecturer and educator. He is certified as Hanshi, Ku Dan, in both Okinawan Gōjū-ryū Karate Do and Kobudo, by the Sho Honbu Jun Do Kan Okinawa Karate Do organization and the Dai Nippon Butoku Kai. He is a Ph.D. (Education Management) and is one of the founders of the International Budo Academy.

Kluger began his study of Karate with Meir Yahel in 1970, and later in 1972 became a student of the late Leon Pantanowitz, who in turn had been a student of and belonged to Morio Higaonna's organization. In 1984, Kluger parted ways with Pantanowitz, and became a student in Eiichi Miyazato's Dojo, the historical Jun Do Kan. Kluger's main Dojo (Honbu Dojo), which he founded in 1972, resides in Petah Tikva. The school has branches in several cities in Israel, as well as in Hungary, South Africa, Australia, New Zealand, Great Britain and Romania. He also teaches the Israeli Krav Maga and military self-defense system, on worldwide seminars as part of the IBSSA organization.

In 1985, Kluger led and managed the first professional martial arts instructor's course ever in the State of Israel, as the head of the martial arts department at the School for Coaches and Instructors at the Wingate Institute. Dr. Kluger created, coached, lectured, trained and certified all educational programs of that department in Wingate, and had a great influence over several generations of Israeli martial arts instructors. In the year 2000, Dr. Kluger left the Wingate Institute, and in 2003 founded and licensed his own government-recognized teaching institute: Karate Do International Institute for Martial Arts Instructors and Coaches. The Institute is recognized with accordance to the Israeli Sports Law of 1988, and is located in Petah Tikva. The Institute teaches, educates and accredits the future generation of martial arts instructors.
