= Netafim =

Israeli irrigation equipment manufacturer

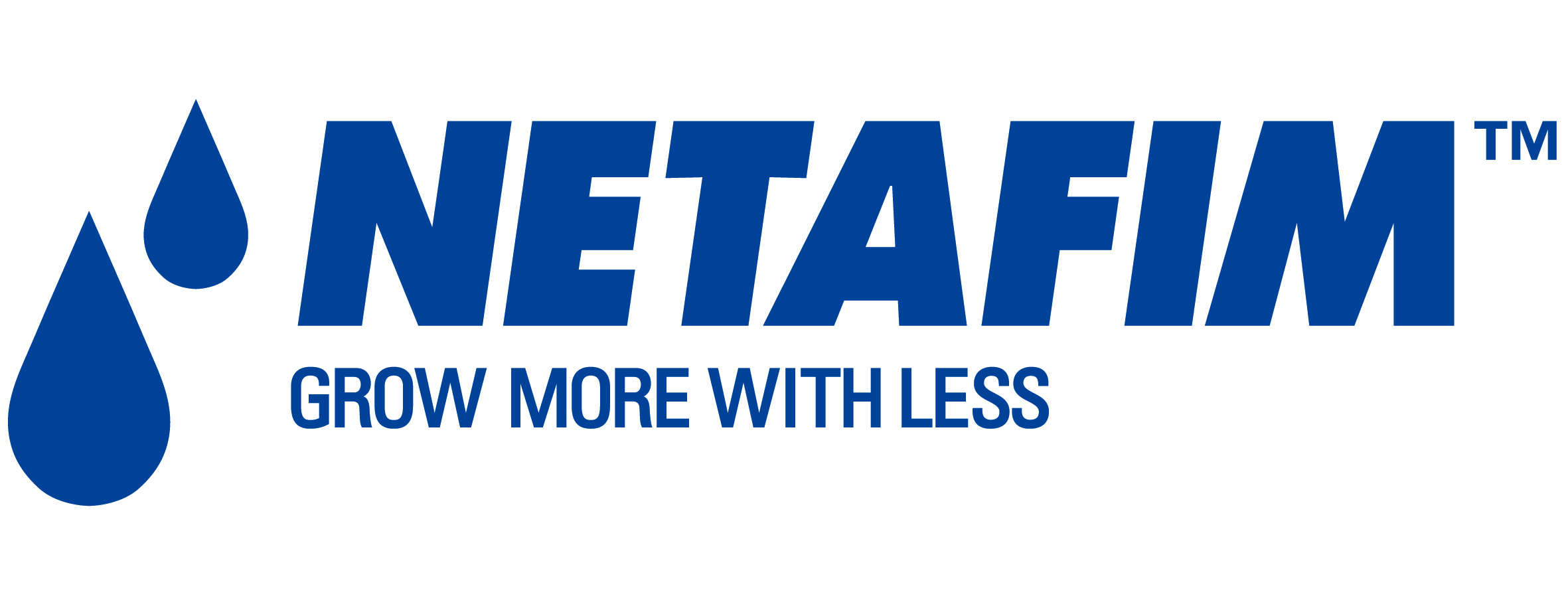

- Type: Private
- Industry: Drip and Micro-irrigation Technologies
- Founded: 1965; 61 years ago
- Headquarters: Israel
- Key people: Gaby Miodownik (President and CEO)
- Revenue: ▲US$ 1.063 billion (2019)
- Number of employees: over 5,000
- Website: www.netafim.com/en/

Netafim is a manufacturer of irrigation equipment owned by Orbia Group. The company produces drippers, dripperlines, sprinklers and micro-emitters. Netafim also manufactures and distributes crop management technologies, including monitoring and control systems, dosing systems, and crop management software, as well as a variety of services, including managed irrigation, agronomical advisory and operation and maintenance. As of 2012, Netafim was the global leader on the fast expanding market of drip- and micro-irrigation. In it was the overall largest provider of drip irrigation systems, with a global market share of 30%.

== History ==
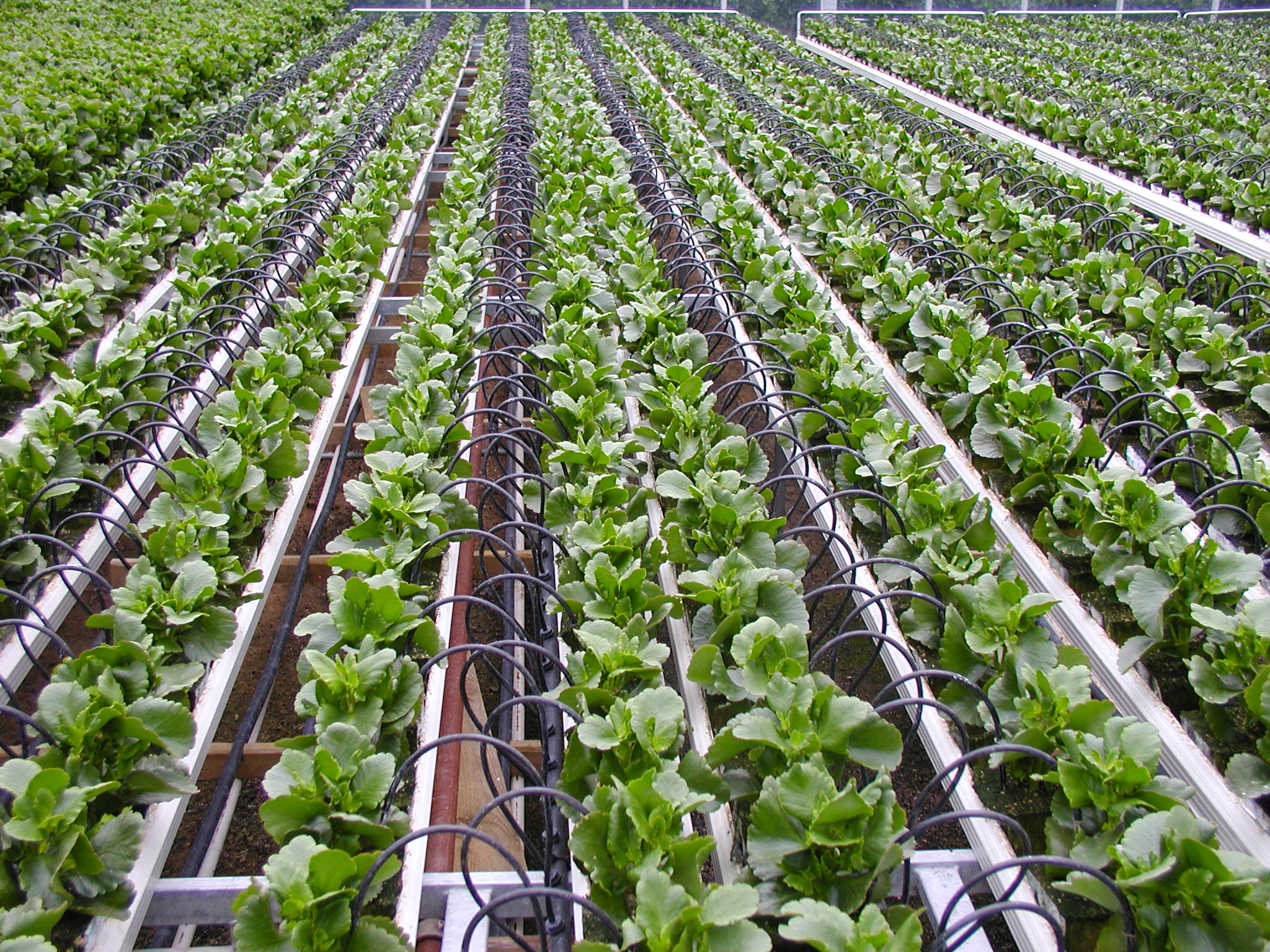
Button dripper

In 2020, Netafim held an over-30% share of the global drip irrigation market. The company recorded revenues of over $1.063 billion in 2019.

Netafim is headed by President & CEO Gaby Miodownik, and jointly owned by Orbia (80%) and Kibbutz Hatzerim (20%), following extensive bidding by half a dozen interested parties, including U.S. industrial technologies company Fortive Corp (FTV.N), Singapore's Temasek Holdings [TEM.UL], U.S. tools maker Stanley Black & Decker (SWK.N), Chinese investment fund Primavera and Chinese pipe maker Ningxia Qinglong (002457.SZ).

== Timeline ==
- 1960–1965 – Water engineer and inventor Simcha Blass carries out tests on the world's first dripper device.
- 1965 – Kibbutz Hatzerim signs agreement with Blass to establish Netafim
- 1966 – Introduces world's first commercial dripper
- 1978 – Introduces world's first pressure compensated (PC) dripper
- 1981 – Opens first subsidiary outside of Israel
- 1998 – Merges into single corporation
- 2007 – Introduces world's first low-flow dripper
- 2011 – Permira funds acquires controlling interest for €800m
- 2013 – Named 2013 Stockholm Industry Water Award (SIWI) Laureate
- 2017 - Mexichem (now Orbia) acquires an 80% stake in Netafim.
- 2020 – Netafim acquires Dutch turnkey greenhouse projects provider Gakon, establishing Gakon Netafim
- 2024 - Netafim announces a strategic partnership with ag-technology company Phytech to integrate plant-based irrigation monitoring and data-driven recommendations into its precision agriculture solutions.
- 2026 - Netafim operates as an 80%-owned subsidiary of Orbia within its Precision Agriculture business group.

== Ownership ==
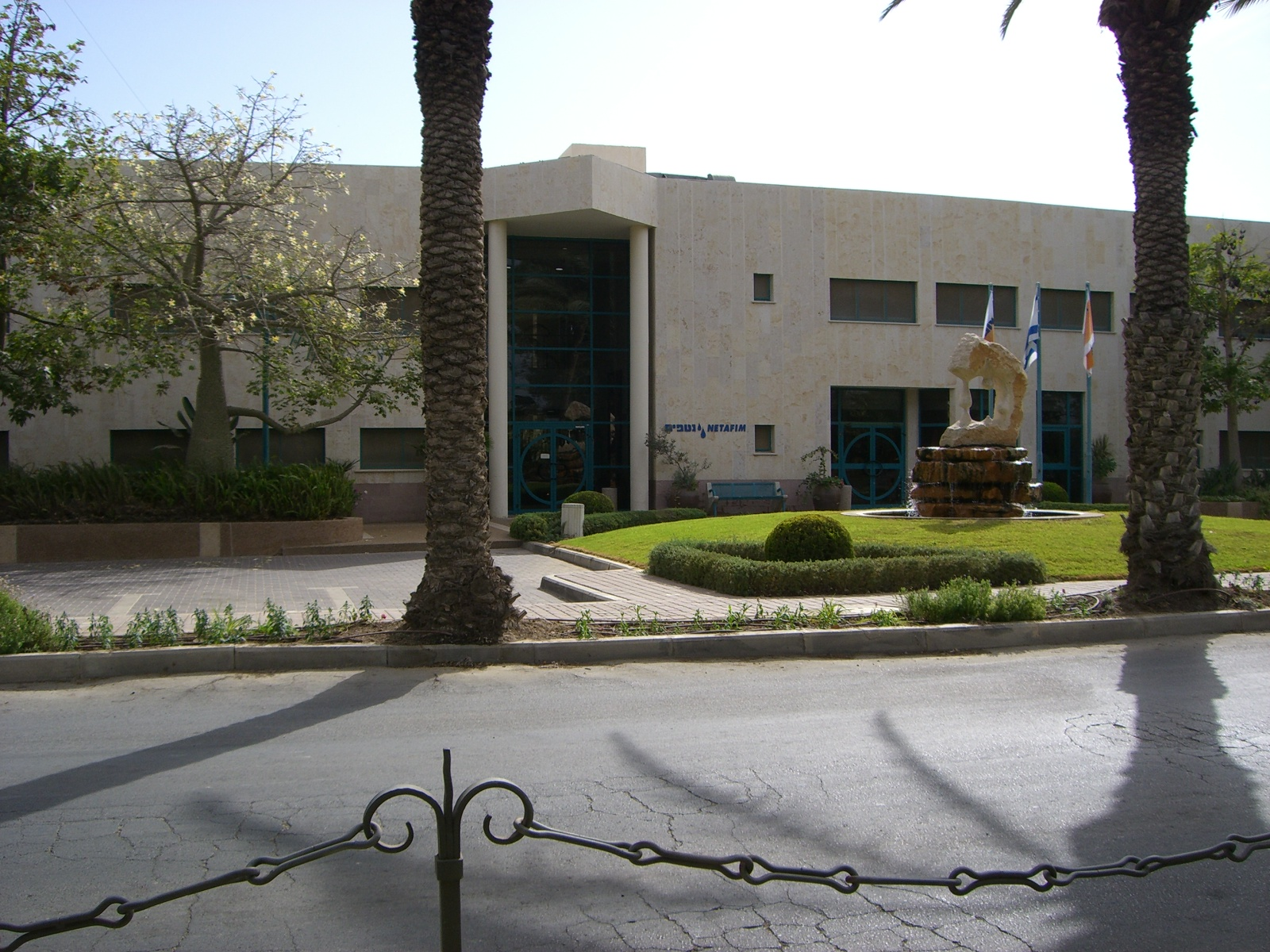
Netafim offices at Hatzerim

In 1973, Netafim brought in its first partner, Kibbutz Magal, based in the Sharon region, and then added a second partner, Kibbutz Yiftach, based in the Upper Galilee region, in 1978. Netafim Hatzerim, Magal and Yiftach merged to create Netafim (ACS) Ltd in 1998. In 2006, Markstone Capital Partners Group and Tene Investment Funds acquired a share of Netafim. In 2011, the European private equity fund Permira acquired a majority (61%) stake in Netafim, with Kibbutz Hatzerim holding 33% and Kibbutz Magal holding 6%. In 2017, these owners sold 80% of Netafim to Mexichem, with Kibbutz Hatzerim retaining 20%.

As of February 2026, Netafim is an 80%-owned subsidiary of Orbia (formerly Mexichem) and operates within Orbia’s Precision Agriculture business group.

== Potential acquisition by Dayu Conserving Water Group (2026) ==
In early 2026, media reports indicated that Orbia was in negotiations concerning a potential sale of a controlling stake in Netafim to a consortium led by Haoyu Wang, chairman of Dayu Conserving Water Group. According to Globes, Wang, a Chinese businessman, had joined forces with the Hopu investment fund in discussions to acquire control of the company from Orbia, which holds 80% of Netafim’s shares; Kibbutz Hatzerim retains the remaining 20%. The reports suggested a valuation of approximately $1.4 billion for the transaction and noted that Wang had visited Israel and met with Netafim management as part of the ongoing discussions. The Globes also reported that previous negotiations with the Israeli private equity fund Fortissimo had stalled before talks with Wang’s group began.

As of February 2026, the proposed sale had not been completed. The reports stated that regulatory review, including potential U.S. approval due to Netafim’s operations in the United States, could influence the outcome of any transfer of control.

Dayu Conserving Water Group is a Chinese irrigation company listed on the Shenzhen Stock Exchange. Calcalist characterised Wang’s bid as being financed from his personal capital, with the possibility of future integration with Dayu, and noted that Orbia might retain a minority stake after any sale.

== Products ==
Netafim produces drip irrigation systems and other water technologies intended to increase yields and improve crop production while preserving quality and quantity of water and soil fertility. The company products are designed to provide solutions in the areas of efficient irrigation, control and agronomy for a range of field crops, orchards and vineyards grown under varied topographic and climatic conditions throughout the world. At present Netafim is developing ecological solutions for producing fuel from alternative sources. Concurrently, Netafim is launching a low pressure irrigation system that offers a solution for areas where water pressure and/or electrical infrastructure do not permit using high pressure systems. This development will facilitate introduction of the drip irrigation systems into additional agricultural areas.

== Global presence ==
In 1981, the company opened NII, its first international subsidiary, in the US. In 2016 Netafim maintained 33 subsidiaries and 17 manufacturing plants worldwide, and employed over 5,000 workers. As of 2026, Netafim’s official corporate profile states that the company operates in 110 countries, with 33 subsidiaries, 19 manufacturing plants, and two recycling facilities, and employs approximately 4,500 people globally.

In January 2014, it was announced on Bloomberg that Netafim had won a $62 million water project contract to build an automated water pipeline network in the southern state of Karnataka, India. Since then, Netafim has won additional 7 community irrigation projects in India covering in total 106,000 hectares and 97,000 farmers. In March 2016, it was announced in Globes that Netafim had won a 200 million project in Ethiopia to provide an end-to-end irrigation solution for a plantation by the Ethiopian government sugar company. Іn March 2019, Netafim won a $60 million project in Rwanda to develop an agribusiness hub.

== Drip irrigation & sustainability ==
Netafim is involved in several global sustainability initiatives. The company is a member of the UN CEO Water Mandate and UN Global Compact (UNGC), and was named 2013 Stockholm Industry Water Award Laureate for its contribution to sustainable water management. According to company sources, the use of drip irrigation for rice and tomatoes cuts down on greenhouse gases and nitrous oxide associated with algae blooms.

== See also ==
- Science and technology in Israel
- Economy of Israel
- Agricultural research in Israel
- Agriculture in Israel
- Bermad
