= Three lookouts =

Jewish settlements established 1943

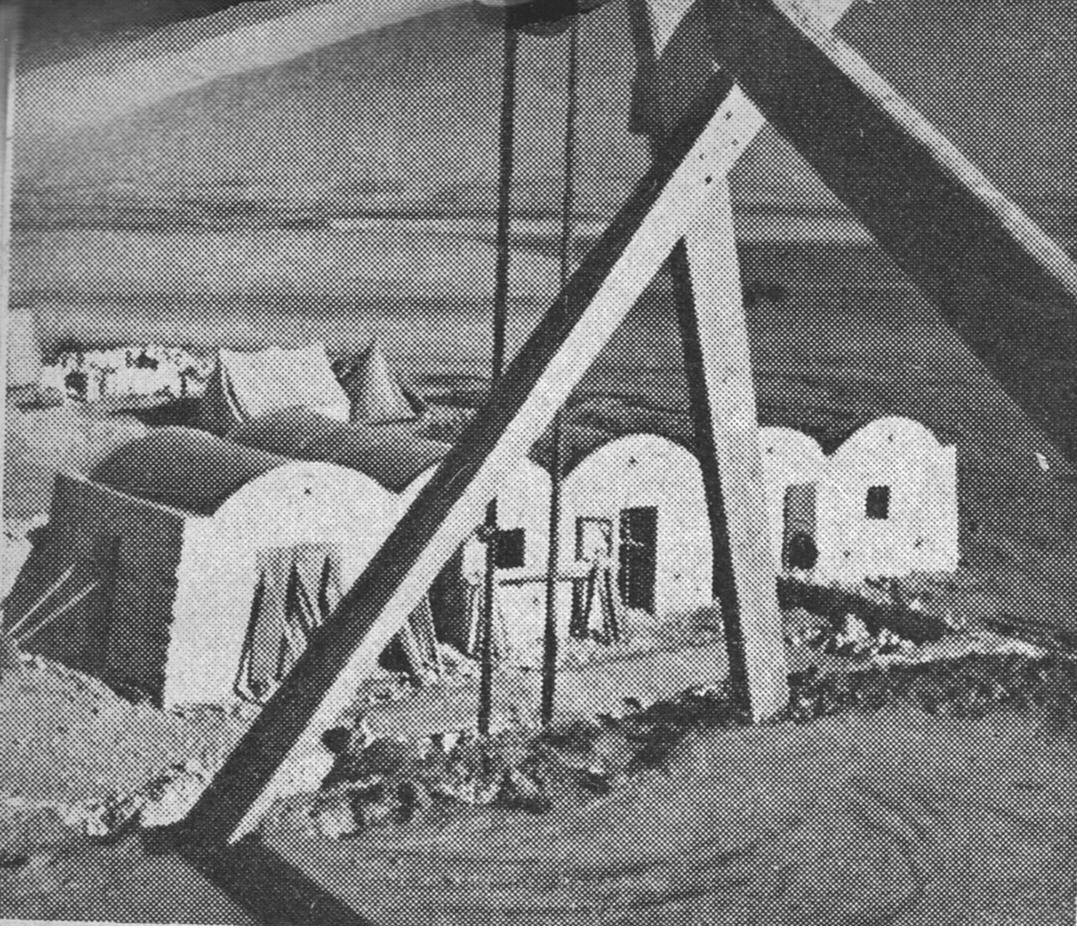
Beit Eshel

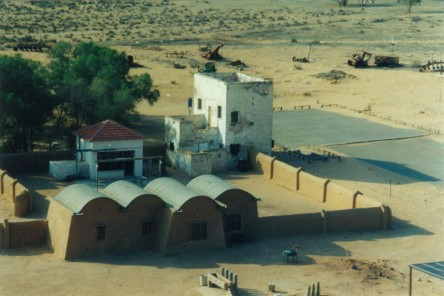
Gvulot

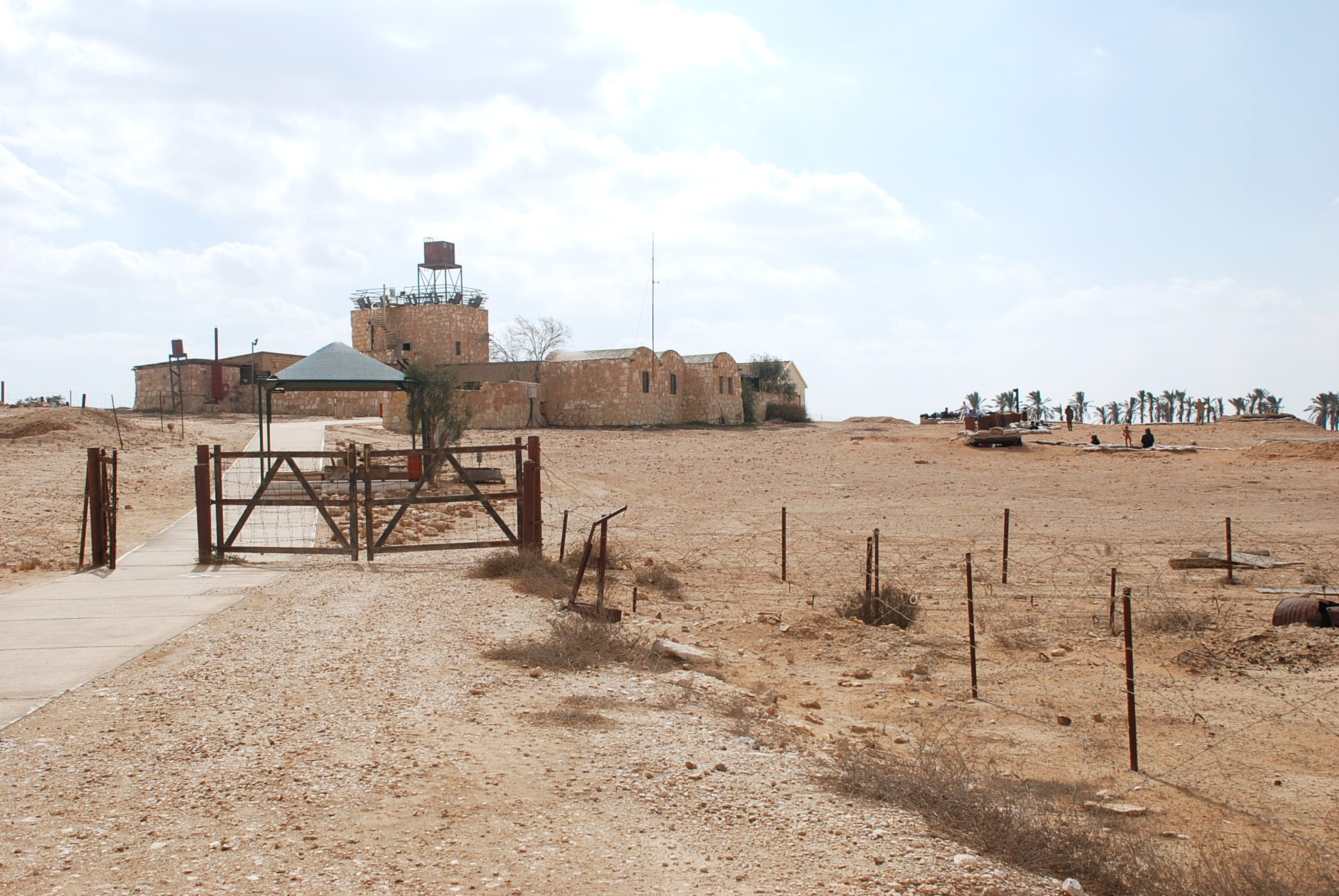
Revivim

The three lookouts (Hebrew: שלושת המצפים, Shloshet HaMitzpim, also Mitzpot) were three Jewish settlements built in the Negev desert in 1943 on land owned by the Jewish National Fund. The goal was securing the land and assessing its feasibility for agriculture. The founding was preceded by a complex land purchase procedure, as the British authorities had practically prohibited Jewish land acquisition in the area following the costly Arab Revolt and the subsequent White Paper of 1939.

These lookouts, Revivim, Gvulot, and Beit Eshel, later served as a springboard for further Jewish population of the Negev. The residents of the lookouts made extensive geophysical surveys and conducted agricultural experiments for this purpose.

== History ==
=== Historical background and early proposals ===
The British White Paper of 1939 and the 1940 Land Transfer Regulations placed a number of restrictions on Jewish settlement and land purchase in the Mandate for Palestine. The Negev desert was one of the areas where both were forbidden. On the other hand, World War II had broken out and the Yishuv sought to broaden its areas of settlement in order to have greater capacity to house Jewish refugees from Europe.

In general, the Yishuv, which was vehemently opposed to the White Paper, was interested in settling the Negev and conducting geological and hydrological surveys there. It also wished to test the British reaction to such a move. On April 29, 1942, a number of Yishuv notables, including Arthur Rupin, Eliezer Kaplan and Yosef Weitz, toured the area to determine its adequacy for settlement. While Rupin and Kaplan proposed creating a number of agricultural settlements in the area, Weitz rejected the idea and recommended the construction of three outposts—in the areas of Rafah, Beersheba and Bir 'Asluj—that would each be located on a different type of soil and help determine the suitability of the surrounding area for agriculture and habitation.

Weitz eventually proposed creating ten such outposts, that would each employ 10–12 workers living in a walled building. Eventually however, only three outposts were created, as per Weitz's original recommendation.

=== Land purchase ===
The land purchases in the Negev were made by the Jewish National Fund (JNF), operating as the Tzukerman Office, a private real estate company secretly affiliated with the JNF. If required to purchase land from Arabs (after 1940), the office would recruit Arabs who had allied themselves with the Yishuv, to circumvent the British ban. The land was mostly purchased from Negev Bedouin, who were usually not nationalistically motivated and more interested in the financial aspect. The JNF also set out to buy Jewish-owned land in the region, which was mostly unused. In 1936, this totalled 41,000 dunams (41 km^{2}). Another policy was to consolidate the lands as much as possible and buy adjacent lots, in order to be able to settle the land later.

In 1943, Weitz ordered Yoav Tzukerman to buy lands near Rafah/Khan Younis, in Wadi Shiniq (HaBesor Stream), and near 'Asluj and Beersheba. Lands were bought, but at the time the Bedouins in the area were enjoying relative prosperity and were less willing to sell. This significantly hurt the settlement plan for Gvulot, which called for the purchase of 5,000–6,000 dunams (5–6 km^{2}).

=== Founding ===
The first settlement, Mitzpe Gvulot (today simply Gvulot) was established on May 12, 1943. The first squad numbered 12 people who came with a truck, four tents and a tractor. The group consisted of native Jews and a number of immigrants from Bulgaria from the Kibbutz HaShomer HaTzair Gimel organization. Most of those who planned to settle in Gvulot stayed in Rishon LeZion, and the lookout was managed from the moshava Beit Gan in the north of the country.

Revivim was founded on July 28, 1943, by the organization HaNoar HaOved VeHaLomed, and originally named Tel Tzofim. Three members came three months earlier, but were driven out by the British. On July 28, six people came to the site and started construction, soon joined by another six.

Beit Eshel's first residents arrived on August 9, 1943—four people with a tractor and two tents. An additional 36 people joined them later. The residents were immigrants from Austria and Germany, later joined by immigrants from Romania and native Jews. The group was called HaYogev (Hebrew: היוגב, lit. The Farmer) and were planning to set up a moshav. However, they were unable to do so due to lack of resources, and therefore organized as a kibbutz instead.

Many of the early settlers, unable to adjust to the intense heat during the day, freezing temperatures at night, and plagues of mosquitoes, packed up and left. Those who remained built uniform settlements consisting of a square courtyard surrounded by walls, a watchtower, living quarters and service buildings.

=== Logistics ===
==== Water supply ====
In the beginning, Gvulot got its water from nearby Arab villages. The price was 1 Palestine pound for 1 cubic meter, very high for the time. The cost of transport (done with a mule cart) was also high. In light of that, great effort was made to find an independent water source in the area. The first well, dug on July 21, 1943, turned up highly saline water. Five additional digs were made in 1943–1944, but turned out unsatisfactory. Tar-covered water collection ditches were also attempted, and helped ease the situation, but much water seeped through them into the ground, and additional filters had to be installed to make the water suitable for drinking.

Although suitable water was found in Beit Eshel, it was too deep to extract effectively at the time; water was purchased from Beersheba. Only after World War II was Beit Eshel able to acquire a suitable pump. Eight wells were dug in Beit Eshel in total, two of them successful (another one was further east and saved for later). Mini-dams were built in the wadis around Beit Eshel for irrigation. A larger dam was planned for the Beersheba Stream, but nothing came of the project.

In Revivim, a water well was purchased from the British administration, but its water was too saline. The workers then received free water from the British military base at Bir 'Asluj, until a new dig uncovered water at a depth of over 100 m and a tractor was modified to pump it out. A dam, the largest in the three lookouts at 1.2 m in height, was eventually built in Revivim. Three large reservoirs were also built in Revivim, with capacities of 40,000, 60,000 and 100,000 m^{3}. They drained into the ground very quickly however. These projects represented the lion's share of the lookouts' expenditures, at over 70,000 Palestine pounds (compared to an annual budget of about 10,000 pounds for each lookout).

By 1946, it had become clear that the three lookouts could not sustain an independent water supply. Also at that time, the Yishuv decided to create 11 additional settlements around the lookouts. In light of that, a decision was made that the water for these settlements would be provided by localities north of the Negev. However, budgets were also approved for additional wells and experiments in the existing villages.

==== Contact with the outside world ====
Beit Eshel's close proximity to Beersheba allowed it to receive superior communication services, such as a regular postal service (the letters were delivered to Beersheba) and a telephone line. The other lookouts communicated only through a pirate radio with the rest of the lookouts and the Haganah.

Transportation of goods and people were done with the vehicles in the lookouts, which each had a van and sometimes a truck. When these were unavailable or could not be used, the residents of Revivim and Beit Eshel relied on outside means—British vehicles traveling to and from the base at 'Asluj and public transport between Gaza and Beersheba, respectively. Gvulot was more isolated and while attempts were made to create a dirt road to Khan Yunis, in the end the residents had to take the route through Rafah. In rainy months, the lookouts were isolated in terms of transportation, especially Gvulot.

=== Relations with non-Jewish elements ===
The British Mandate authorities were ambivalent towards the founding of the lookouts. On the one hand, the Yishuv broke Mandatory law not just with the land purchases, but also with illegally holding weapons and operating illegal radios. On the other hand, there was no reason not to allow the Jews to attempt permanent settlement in the Negev, which was rare due to the Negev Bedouin's nomadic lifestyle. The local authorities took either a pro-Zionist or anti-Zionist stand depending on who headed them. The relationship with the British military were generally warm, especially in Revivim where some of the residents worked in the British base in 'Asluj and the British protected the area to prevent theft.

Relations with the Bedouin were also mostly positive. The lookouts were in constant contact with the sheiks of the Azzazma and Tarabin tribes that ruled the area. Gvulot employed eight Bedouin guards. While economic ties were limited, the lookouts made an effort to keep warm social ties. Each lookout appointed a Mukhtar and kept Bedouin hospitality traditions. By contrast, relations with the fellaheen of the area were limited to negligible.

=== Construction and development in 1943–1948 ===
Other than the agricultural work, the lookouts' managers sought to create additional employment. In Beit Eshel, many of the residents were forced to move to Ness Ziona due to lack of jobs. Several factories were therefore built in the village, including a wool processing plant, a tin plant and a factory that manufactured construction materials. A cannery was built in Revivim. Gvulot planned to build a diamond processing plant, but the relevant equipment was destroyed in the 1948 Arab–Israeli War.

Little non-agricultural development occurred during these years outside Beit Eshel. While Gvulot and Revivim each had over 100 members, only a few actually lived on the sites—12–14 in Gvulot and about 25 in Revivim. Despite this, the vast majority of these residents worked in the lookouts, something uncommon at the time.

The residential areas of the lookouts were built as a castle—a two-floor stone building serving as a tower, with a 35 m^{2} courtyard surrounded by a stone wall. The tower served as the living quarters for up to 25 people, and the lookouts were encouraged not to build living quarters anywhere else for security reasons. However, this was disregarded in Beit Eshel as the need for additional living space arose. By 1947, security considerations trumped all others in plans for new constructions, not just in the lookouts, but also in most other settlements in the Negev.

=== 1948 Arab–Israeli War ===
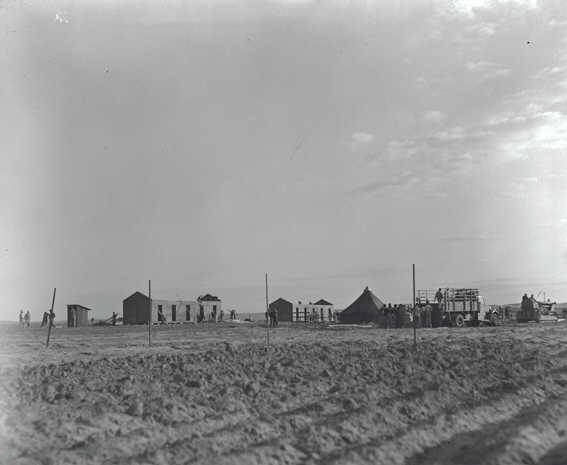
Halutza. 19 November 1947

The first attack on one of the lookouts came in the civil war stage, on December 16, 1947, when local Bedouin attacked a vehicle between Halutza and Revivim. The British forces in the area refused to intervene.

During the 1948 Arab–Israeli War, beginning with an attack on May 17, 1948 by the Muslim Brotherhood, Beit Eshel was besieged by Egyptian forces and destroyed. When Beersheba was captured by the Israel Defense Forces in the Battle of Beersheba in 1948, the site was abandoned. Its inhabitants moved to the Jezreel Valley, establishing Moshav HaYogev.

== Geography ==
The three lookouts are located in different parts of the Negev desert with different characteristics; Gvulot was founded close to Wadi Shiniq (Beersheba Stream), on a plateau 125 m above sea level. Gvulot's lands were heavily dispersed, going from Dangour in the west to Hazali in the east. The lands were mostly on sandy soil, being just north of expansive sand dunes. Beit Eshel was also built on a plateau, about 300 m above sea level, 3 km east of Beersheba, on loess soil. Revivim was built on a limestone hill surrounded by a plateau. The soil was a mix of sand and loess.

== Research and experiments conducted ==
As intended, the founding of the lookouts led to a number of important scientific researches which assisted future Jewish agricultural settlement in the Negev desert.

=== Scientific surveys ===
An important geological survey was conducted in 1944–1945. The survey included 2,450 samples spread over 2.7 million dunams (2,700 km^{2}). It concluded, among other things, that most of the Negev's soil was deeper than 2 m and of the loess type.

The Hebrew University of Jerusalem conducted meteorological surveys. The only previous surveys had been done on a much smaller scale in police stations in the area in the 19th century. They concluded that precipitation was higher in the northern Negev than in the southern, although the amount varied significantly from year to year, making it impossible to rely on the average amount. In addition, it was discovered that the proportion of rainfall in each month to the yearly average was different in the Negev than in other areas in Mandatory Palestine; in particular, there was a lot of rainfall in the month of May. The measurements also concluded that the amount of dew falling in the northern and western Negev was higher than in any other part of Mandatory Palestine. Research was also performed on the temperature, winds, air moisture and evaporation.

Hydrological surveys were conducted by Leo Picard, who concluded that none of the three lookouts would serve as suitable locations for extracting ground water, which was either nonexistent or suffered from excessive salinity. The only potential drilling site for water, according to Picard, was on the coastal plain between Gaza and Rafah. This research provided a general direction for choosing which land to purchase in the future.

=== Agricultural experiments ===
A number of agricultural experiments were also conducted, which would pave the way for future agriculture in the arid region. In Beit Eshel, attempts were made to grow wheat, barley, oatmeal and legumes. It was concluded that growing these crops in the summer was not possible in that region, but the winter cultivation proved successful, by 1944 yielding 60 kg of wheat and 90 kg of barley per dunam (compared to 11.5 and 13.7, respectively, in the nearby Arab villages). A similar success was recorded in Gvulot, which yielded 61.5 kg of wheat, 75 kg of barkey, 86 kg of oatmeal and 98 kg of peas per dunam. Despite this, it was noted that 1944 was a rainy year and the yields could be lower in other years.

By contrast, in Revivim, both winter and summer cultivations were reasonably successful, but the village was criticized for using rainwater that had been expensive to collect for large-scale farming, especially during the winter months. It was therefore unclear whether cereal farming in Revivim was financially feasible.

Fruits and vegetables were also grown in the lookouts. In Revivim, vegetable harvests were rich, but much water was required to maintain the crops (275 m^{3} per dunam in for corn and 360 m^{3} for radish and beet), therefore making the venture unprofitable. Orchards were planted at low density (about 4 trees per dunam) of olives, peaches, apricots, almonds and pomegranates. Many of them froze in the winter or did not grow due to excessive water salinity. The most successful were dates, olives and pomegranates, which could grow on saline water.

=== Forestry ===
Trees were planted in the lookouts in order to shield the agricultural land from storms and moving sand. It was hoped that some of these would also turn a profit. In the years 1943–1948, about 500,000 seedlings were planted, with species including tamarix, eucalyptus, cypress and others.

== See also ==
- 11 points in the Negev

== Sources ==
- Kark, Ruth (2003). The First Observation Posts in the Negev, the Sixtieth Anniversary: 1943–2003 (in Hebrew). Ariel Publishing House.
- Lehn, Walter; Davis, Uri (1988). The Jewish National Fund. Taylor & Francis. ISBN 978-0-7103-0053-9.
- Lorch, Netanel (1998). History of the War of Independence (in Hebrew). Modan Publishing.
