= Hatzerim =

Kibbutz in Southern Israel

Hatzerim: חֲצֵרִים (Hebrew); حتسريم (Arabic)
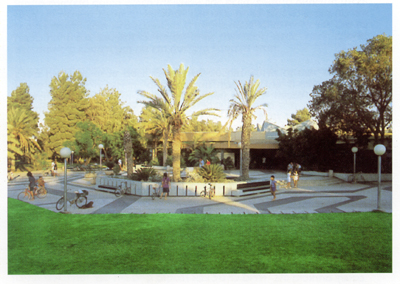
- Etymology: Farmyards
- Location within Northwest Negev region of Israel Location within Israel
- Coordinates: 31°14′25″N 34°42′51″E
- Country: Israel
- District: Southern
- Subdistrict: Beersheba
- Council: Bnei Shimon
- Affiliation: Kibbutz Movement
- Founded: October 1946
- Founder: Israeli Scouts
- Population (2024): 990
- Website: www.hatzerim.org.il

Hatzerim (Hebrew: חֲצֵרִים, lit. Farmyards) is a kibbutz located 8 kilometers west of Beersheba in the Negev desert in Israel. It is named after the Bible (Deuteronomy 2:23), mentioning a site nearby: "the Avvites who lived in farmyards as far as Gaza". It belongs to the Bnei Shimon Regional Council. In 2024 it had a population of 990.

== History ==
The community was established in October 1946 by a young group of scouts who were then later joined by Polish-Jewish refugees from the Soviet Union; they reached Israel via Iran with the Polish Army, referred to as "The Children of Teheran" ("Dzieci Teheranu" in Polish). They then learned agriculture and military training becoming part of the Haganah ground forces.

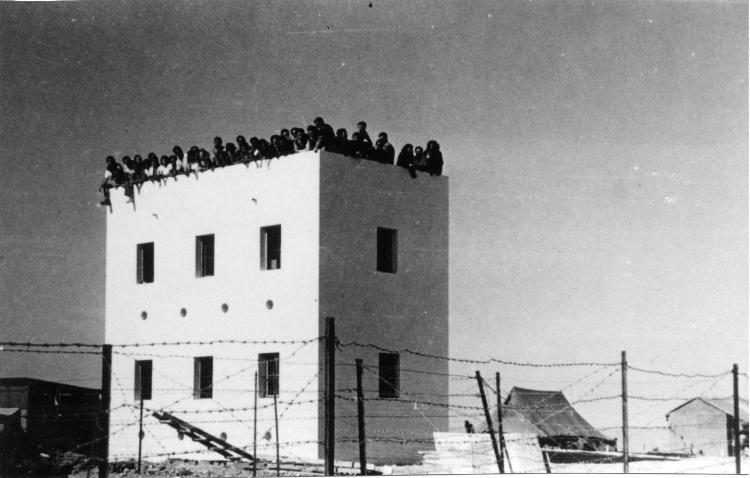
Members of the Palmach on a trek from Ashdot Ya'akov to Masada. Hatzerim 1947

In the 1960s, the Hatzerim Airbase was built nearby. Hatzerim is now a well developed kibbutz (one of Israel's richest) due to the profits from Netafim. The kibbutz has amenities such as a library, swimming pool, dentist and a zoo.

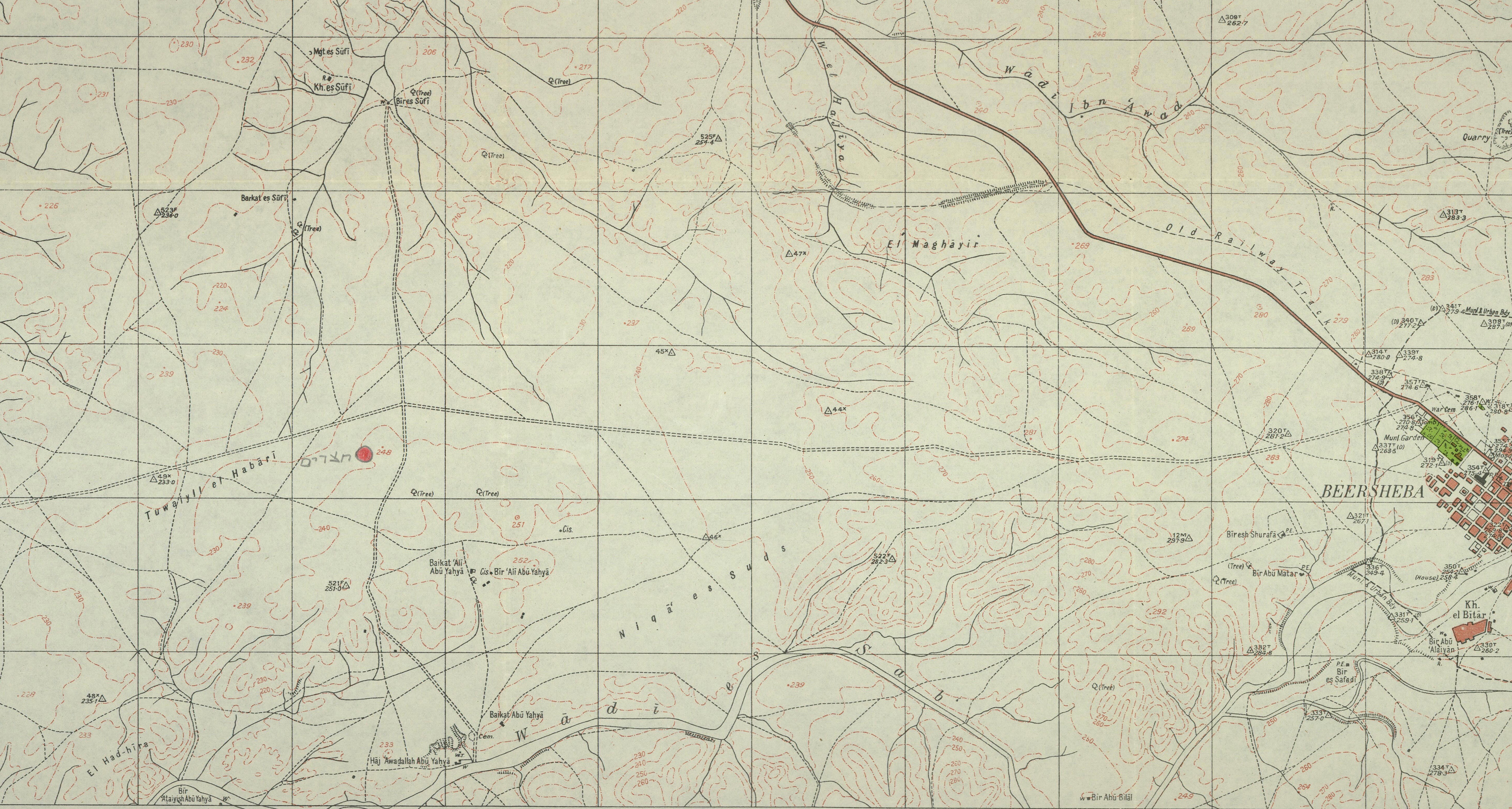
Hatzerim 1947 1:20,000 (red spot)

== Netafim ==
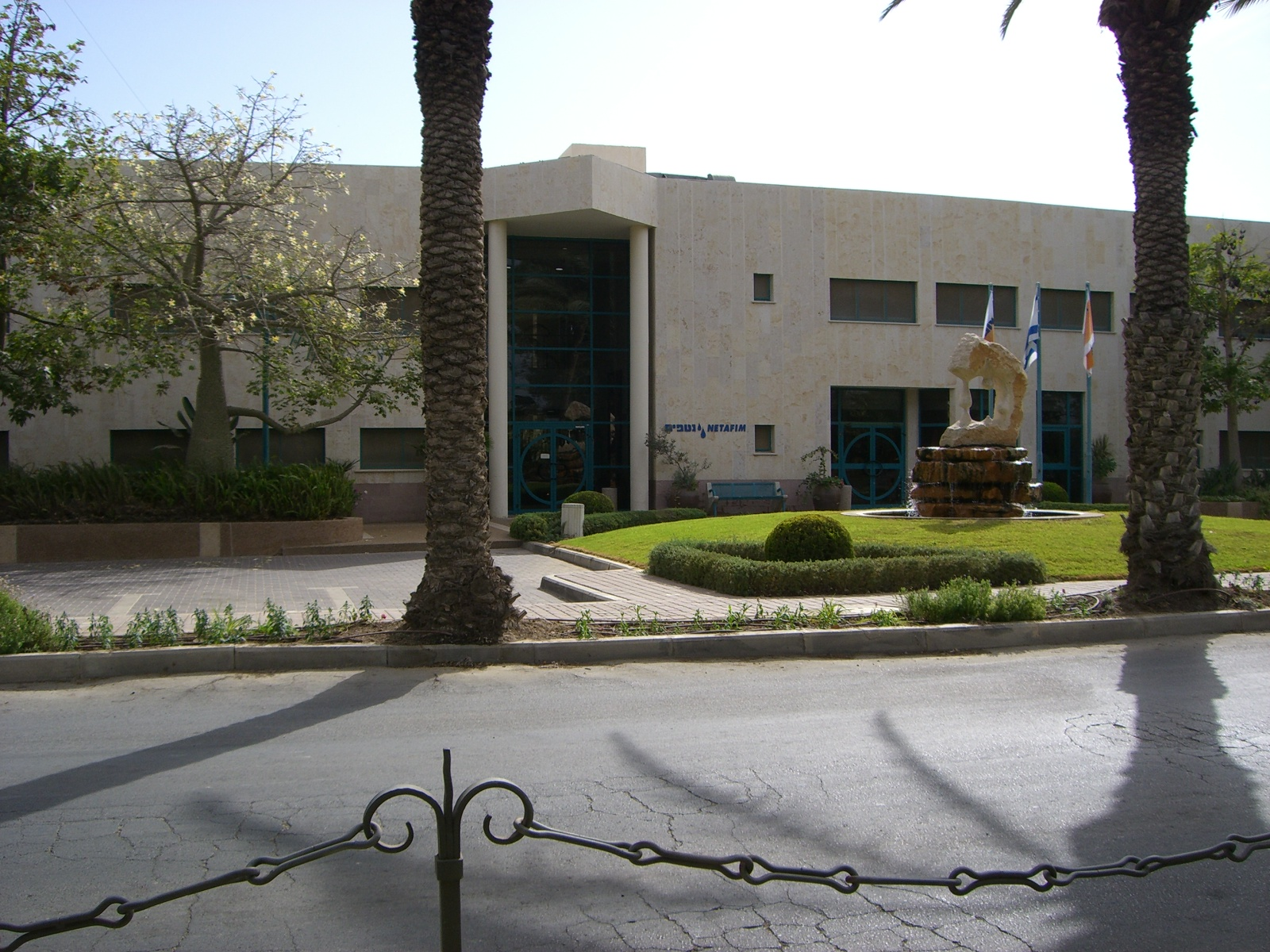
Netafim offices at Hatzerim.

Hatzerim was one of the first kibbutzim (pl.) to break the mould from traditional agriculture and start a business. Netafim is the kibbutz business that started in 1965, that designs, manufactures and distributes irrigation systems. The business is also run with two other kibbutzim, Magal and Yiftach. There are also factories around the world, California, USA, South Africa, Western Australia and more. Netafim soon became a world leader in their field as a multinational corporation that grosses over $300 million a year. Hatzerim also produces jojoba oil. There are fields all around the kibbutz.

== Notable residents ==
- Nir Malhi, martial arts teacher
