= Jalgaon Assembly constituency =

Constituency of the Maharashtra legislative assembly in India

Jalgaon
- Former constituency for the Maharashtra Legislative Assembly

Constituency details
- Country: India
- Region: Western India
- State: Maharashtra
- Established: 1952
- Abolished: 2008
- Total electors: 280,778

Jalgaon Assembly constituency was an assembly constituency in the India state of Maharashtra.

== Members of the Legislative Assembly ==
Election	Member	Party
1952	Kashirao Patil	Sarvodaya Karnataka Paksha
1957	Sadashiv Bhalerao	Communist Party of India
1962	Pratibha Patil	Indian National Congress
1967	T. T. Salunkhe	Indian National Congress
1972	Madhukar Atmaram Patil	Indian National Congress
1978	Ishwarlal Shankarlal Jain	Indian National Congress (I)
1980	Sureshkumar Bhikamchand Jain	Indian National Congress (I)
1985	Sureshkumar Bhikamchand Jain	Indian Congress (Socialist)
1990	Sureshkumar Bhikamchand Jain	Indian Congress (Socialist) – Sarat Chandra Sinha
1995	Sureshkumar Bhikamchand Jain	Indian National Congress
1996 By-election	Sureshkumar Bhikamchand Jain	Shiv Sena
1999	Sureshkumar Bhikamchand Jain	Shiv Sena
2002 By-election	Sureshkumar Bhikamchand Jain	Nationalist Congress Party
2004	Sureshkumar Bhikamchand Jain	Nationalist Congress Party
2008 onwards : See Jalgaon City, Jalgaon Rural

== Election results ==
=== Assembly Election 2004 ===
2004 Maharashtra Legislative Assembly election : Jalgaon
Party	Candidate	Votes	%	±%
NCP	Sureshkumar Bhikamchand Jain	73,987	47.90%	▲0.56
SS	Prof. Sonawane Chandrakant Baliram	68,099	44.09%	▼1.17
Independent	Subhash S. Sonawane	5,255	3.40%	New
BSP	Sonawane Babalu Dagadu	2,238	1.45%	New
Independent	Shaikh Salim Isamoddin	1,716	1.11%	New
Margin of victory		5,888	3.81%	▲1.72
Turnout		154,452	55.01%	▲8.05
Total valid votes		154,450		
Registered electors		280,778		▲7.91
NCP hold		Swing	▲0.56	

=== Assembly By-election 2002 ===
2002 Maharashtra Legislative Assembly by-election : Jalgaon
Party	Candidate	Votes	%	±%
NCP	J.S.K.Bhikamchand	57,857	47.35%	▲42.73
SS	S.C.Baliram	55,305	45.26%	▼1.44
Independent	Patil Narendra Bhaskarrao	5,879	4.81%	New
Independent	She. Amin.She Yasin	1,921	1.57%	New
BBM	Kolhe Ashok Pundalik	1,234	1.01%	New
Margin of victory		2,552	2.09%	▼14.47
Turnout		122,196	46.96%	▼11.88
Total valid votes		122,196		
Registered electors		260,197		▲11.78
NCP gain from SS		Swing	▲0.65	

=== Assembly Election 1999 ===
1999 Maharashtra Legislative Assembly election : Jalgaon
Party	Candidate	Votes	%	±%
SS	Sureshkumar Bhikamchand Jain	63,964	46.70%	▼14.84
INC	Dr. Arjun Ganpat Bhangale	41,280	30.14%	▼8.33
Independent	Sonawane Bhilabhau Gotu	24,263	17.71%	New
NCP	Sonawane Kashinath Ragho Alias Dr. K. R. Sonawane	6,327	4.62%	New
Margin of victory		22,684	16.56%	▼6.51
Turnout		144,263	61.97%	▲5.99
Total valid votes		136,972		
Registered electors		232,778		▲2.96
SS hold		Swing	▼14.84	

=== Assembly By-election 1996 ===
1996 Maharashtra Legislative Assembly by-election : Jalgaon
Party	Candidate	Votes	%	±%
SS	Sureshkumar Bhikamchand Jain	73,532	61.54%	▲50.02
INC	Ravindra Pralhadrao Patil	45,964	38.46%	▼9.80
Margin of victory		27,568	23.07%	▼0.96
Turnout		121,605	53.79%	▼15.36
Total valid votes		119,496		
Registered electors		226,085		▼3.55
SS gain from INC		Swing	▲13.27	

=== Assembly Election 1995 ===
1995 Maharashtra Legislative Assembly election : Jalgaon
Party	Candidate	Votes	%	±%
INC	Sureshkumar Bhikamchand Jain	77,172	48.26%	▲18.14
Independent	Dr. Arjun Ganpat Bhangale	38,743	24.23%	New
SS	Dhekale Sadashivrao Ganpatrao	18,419	11.52%	▼4.62
Independent	Subhash Tarachand Agarwal	10,577	6.62%	New
JD	Prof. Shekhar Madhukar Sonalkar	4,651	2.91%	New
Independent	Bhalerao Sadashiv Narayan	1,911	1.20%	New
Independent	Adv. Sonawane Suresh Anandrao	1,911	1.20%	New
Margin of victory		38,429	24.03%	▲3.75
Turnout		163,938	69.94%	▲8.18
Total valid votes		159,894		
Registered electors		234,399		▲15.23
INC gain from INS(SCS)		Swing	▼2.15	

=== Assembly Election 1990 ===
1990 Maharashtra Legislative Assembly election : Jalgaon
Party	Candidate	Votes	%	±%
INS(SCS)	Sureshkumar Bhikamchand Jain	61,562	50.41%	New
INC	Ishwarlal Shankarlal Jain	36,792	30.13%	▼10.87
SS	Jagtap Prakash Daulat	19,710	16.14%	New
Independent	Patil P. E. Tatya	1,169	0.96%	New
Independent	Ale Hemant Shankar	864	0.71%	New
Margin of victory		24,770	20.28%	▲6.77
Turnout		124,393	61.15%	▲1.77
Total valid votes		122,122		
Registered electors		203,424		▲35.65
INS(SCS) gain from IC(S)		Swing	▼4.10	

=== Assembly Election 1985 ===
1985 Maharashtra Legislative Assembly election : Jalgaon
Party	Candidate	Votes	%	±%
IC(S)	Sureshkumar Bhikamchand Jain	47,629	54.51%	New
INC	Choudhari Ramesh Pandit	35,819	41.00%	New
CPI	Bhalerao Sadashiv Narayan	2,315	2.65%	New
Independent	Ghade Rajaram Asaram	855	0.98%	New
Margin of victory		11,810	13.52%	▼20.19
Turnout		89,076	59.40%	▲1.99
Total valid votes		87,374		
Registered electors		149,963		▲14.34
IC(S) gain from INC(I)		Swing	▼4.87	

=== Assembly Election 1980 ===
1980 Maharashtra Legislative Assembly election : Jalgaon
Party	Candidate	Votes	%	±%
INC(I)	Sureshkumar Bhikamchand Jain	43,827	59.38%	▲19.07
INC(U)	Chaudhari Tukaram Shripat	18,946	25.67%	New
BJP	Gajanan Pannalal Joshi	9,380	12.71%	New
Independent	Sapkale Gorkhnath Daulat	452	0.61%	New
Margin of victory		24,881	33.71%	▲23.78
Turnout		75,314	57.42%	▼8.41
Total valid votes		73,808		
Registered electors		131,157		▲13.60
INC(I) hold		Swing	▲19.07	

=== Assembly Election 1978 ===
1978 Maharashtra Legislative Assembly election : Jalgaon
Party	Candidate	Votes	%	±%
INC(I)	Ishwarlal Shankarlal Jain	30,099	40.31%	New
JP	Shikh Mo. Ismail Ibrahim	22,684	30.38%	New
Independent	Sonawane Sitaram Totaram	8,453	11.32%	New
INC	Patil Kashinath Dodhu	8,372	11.21%	▼34.15
CPI	Bhalerao Sadashiv Narayan	4,609	6.17%	▼33.00
Margin of victory		7,415	9.93%	▲3.74
Turnout		77,007	66.70%	▲11.09
Total valid votes		74,677		
Registered electors		115,451		▲19.99
INC(I) gain from INC		Swing	▼5.06	

=== Assembly Election 1972 ===
1972 Maharashtra Legislative Assembly election : Jalgaon
Party	Candidate	Votes	%	±%
INC	Madhukar Atmaram Patil	23,392	45.36%	▲6.57
CPI	Bhalerao Sadashiv Narayan	20,199	39.17%	▲4.64
ABJS	Nikam Raghunath Jayawantrao	7,144	13.85%	▼7.93
Independent	Heman Shankar Kale	527	1.02%	New
Margin of victory		3,193	6.19%	▲1.93
Turnout		53,619	55.73%	▼3.83
Total valid votes		51,565		
Registered electors		96,214		▲15.58
INC hold		Swing	▲6.57	

=== Assembly Election 1967 ===
1967 Maharashtra Legislative Assembly election : Jalgaon
Party	Candidate	Votes	%	±%
INC	T. T. Salunkhe	18,543	38.80%	▼16.28
CPI	Bhalerao Sadashiv Narayan	16,506	34.53%	▲11.85
ABJS	P. K. Zare	10,410	21.78%	▲4.22
PSP	S. H. Rayasoni	1,789	3.74%	▼0.93
Independent	N. T. Joshi	390	0.82%	New
Margin of victory		2,037	4.26%	▼28.12
Turnout		53,806	64.64%	▲4.38
Total valid votes		47,797		
Registered electors		83,241		▲24.55
INC hold		Swing	▼16.28	

=== Assembly Election 1962 ===
1962 Maharashtra Legislative Assembly election : Jalgaon
Party	Candidate	Votes	%	±%
INC	Pratibha Narayanrao Patil	19,524	55.07%	▲10.48
CPI	Bhalerao Sadashiv Narayan	8,043	22.69%	▼32.72
ABJS	Keshavrao Tryambakrao Bhoite	6,226	17.56%	New
PSP	Dulichand Lalchand Joshi	1,658	4.68%	New
Margin of victory		11,481	32.39%	▲21.57
Turnout		39,092	58.49%	▼10.17
Total valid votes		35,451		
Registered electors		66,834		▲6.86
INC gain from CPI		Swing	▼0.33	

=== Assembly Election 1957 ===
1957 Bombay State Legislative Assembly election : Jalgaon
Party	Candidate	Votes	%	±%
CPI	Bhalerao Sadashiv Narayan	21,905	55.41%	New
INC	Mahajan Yadav Shivram	17,630	44.59%	▲4.76
Margin of victory		4,275	10.81%	▲2.03
Turnout		39,535	63.21%	▲2.15
Total valid votes		39,535		
Registered electors		62,545		▲29.09
CPI gain from SKP		Swing	▲6.79	

=== Assembly Election 1952 ===
1952 Madhya Pradesh Legislative Assembly election : Jalgaon
Party	Candidate	Votes	%	±%
SKP	Kashirao Patil	14,384	48.62%	New
INC	Narayan Vithuji Bochare	11,784	39.83%	New
Independent	Namdeo Chimnaji Tapre	3,418	11.55%	New
Margin of victory		2,600	8.79%	
Turnout		29,586	61.06%	
Total valid votes		29,586		
Registered electors		48,451		
SKP win (new seat)				
