= Lalit Kolhe =

Indian politician

Former Mayor of Jalgaon
- In office September 2017
- Preceded by: Nitin Ladda

Deputy Mayor of Jalgaon
- In office 2016–2017

Corporator, Jalgaon Municipal Corporation
- In office 1996–2016
- Constituency: Jalgaon Municipal Corporation

Personal details
- Born: 22 January 1975 (age 51)
- Party: Bharatiya Janata Party (since July 2018); Maharashtra Navnirman Sena; Khandesh Vikas Aghadi

Lalit Vijay Kolhe is an Indian politician. He is affiliated with Bharatiya Janata Party since July 2018. He was formerly associated with Maharashtra Navnirman Sena.

He was elected as the Mayor of Jalgaon in September 2017, succeeded by Nitin Ladda. Before his appointment to Mayor of Jalgaon Municipal Corporation, he was serving as the Jalgaon's deputy mayor, with support of MNS and Khandesh Vikas Aghadi, a party led by former Maharashtra Minister Suresh Jain.

He unsuccessfully contested the 2009 and 2014 legislative assembly election from Jalgaon (Assembly constituency) on the ticket of MNS.

Kolhe served as a corporator to the Jalgaon Municipal Corporation for Ward No.17-B from 1996 to 2016.

He also served as the Nagpur district president of Maharashtra Navnirman Sena and he resigned from his post in November 2014.

== Positions held ==
#	From	To	Position	Refs.
01	2017	Incumbent	Mayor of Jalgaon	
02	2016	2017	Deputy Mayor of Jalgaon	
03	1996	2016	Corporator, Jalgaon Municipal Corporation	
04	-	2014	Chief, Maharashtra Navnirman Sena, Jalgaon district	
