= GRF =

GRF may refer to:

- Garforth railway station, West Yorkshire, England (National Rail station code)
- Gaussian random field
- Gerald R. Ford, 38th president of the United States
- Global Relief Foundation
- Gandhi Research Foundation, Jalgaon, India Gandhi_Teerth.
- Grifols, a European pharmaceutical company
- Ground reaction force
- Gonadotropin-releasing hormone
- Growth hormone-releasing factor
- Gray Army Airfield, in Washington, United States
- Groupement des Radiodiffuseurs Français de l’UER, a French public radio and television broadcasting organisation
