= Majhapaper =

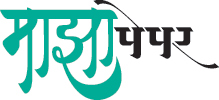
- Type: Private
- Headquarters: Pune, India
- Region served: Maharashtra

Majhapaper.com is a Marathi online news and article publishing website. It caters to the wide Marathi speaking population of 30,000,000 all over the world. Owned by Hrimon Media Pvt Ltd, Pune, Majhapaper is the first digital publication which is exclusively published in Marathi. Along with a headquarter in Pune, Majhapaper has offices in Solapur and Jalgaon. The Majhapaper website currently has more than 50,000 news articles with special focus on categories such as Youth, Health, Agriculture, Career etc.
