= Gulabrao Deokar =

Indian politician

Gulabrao Baburao Deokar

Member of Maharashtra Legislative Assembly
- In office 2009–2014
- Succeeded by: Gulab Raghunath Patil
- Constituency: Jalgaon Rural

Cabinet Minister in Second Ashok Chavan ministry
- In office 7 November 2009 – 10 November 2010
- Minister: Agriculture; Animal Husbandry; Dairy Development; Fisheries Department; Transport; Soil and Water Conservation; Employment Guarantee; Other Backward Classes

Cabinet Minister in Prithviraj Chavan ministry
- In office 11 June 2013 – 26 September 2014
- Minister: Agriculture; Animal Husbandry; Dairy Development; Fisheries Department; Transport; Soil and Water Conservation; Employment Guarantee; Other Backward Classes

Personal details
- Born: 1956
- Party: Nationalist Congress Party – Sharadchandra Pawar (2023 - Present)
- Parent: Baburao Deokar (Father)
- Education: 10th
- Occupation: Politician; businessman
- Profession: politician; businessman

Gulabrao Baburao Deokar was a member of the Maharashtra Legislative Assembly. He represented the Jalgaon Rural Assembly Constituency. He belongs to the Nationalist Congress Party.

Gulabrao Deokar is an Indian politician belonging to the Nationalist Congress Party Sharadchandra Pawar.

He owns and operates many private colleges in Jalgaon city.

== Personal life ==
Gulabrao Deokar was born to Baburao Deokar. He studied till 10th class and then dropped-out. As of 2019, he has total assets of 5.07 Cr, movable assets of 1.34 Cr, immovable property of 3.73 Cr and there are two court cases on him.

== Career ==
Deokar was a member in Jalgaon town's local administrative body. After he was found guilty by district court in Jalgaon housing scam, due to political pressure he resigned from the post of state's Urban transport minister. Later NCP also expelled him from party. Over the years Deokar built many private colleges in Jalgaon city. In 2014 while in prison for the corruption he contested Assembly election but ended up losing. In 2019 he again contested 2019 Indian general election to become Member of Indian parliament but again ended up losing. Despite the fact he got convicted in one of the massive corruption scams in history of Maharashtra, he still enjoys large support in and around Jalgaon city. It is reported that the scam was masterminded by then MLA Suresh Jain caused ₹ 150 crore loss to Jalgaon Municipal Corporation, and poor public of Jalgaon did not get the promised affordable houses. The investigation and court proceedings of the scam ran for more than 7 years.

== Jalgaon housing scam ==
In 2019, Dhule District Court sentenced Deokar to five years of imprisonment in the ₹110 crore Jalgaon housing scam case. He was a member of the Jalgaon Municipal Corporation during this major fraud.

== Businesses ==
Amid 2000s to 2010s he started many private colleges in Jalgaon city and named them after himself such as Gulabrao Deokar institute of pharmacy and research centre, Gulabrao Deokar college of engineering, a polytechnic college etc. To study in these colleges, students have to pay large amount of fees and sometimes donations if tried to take admission from management quota.

== See also ==
- Adarsh Housing Society scam
