= Praveen Gedam =

Indian civil servant

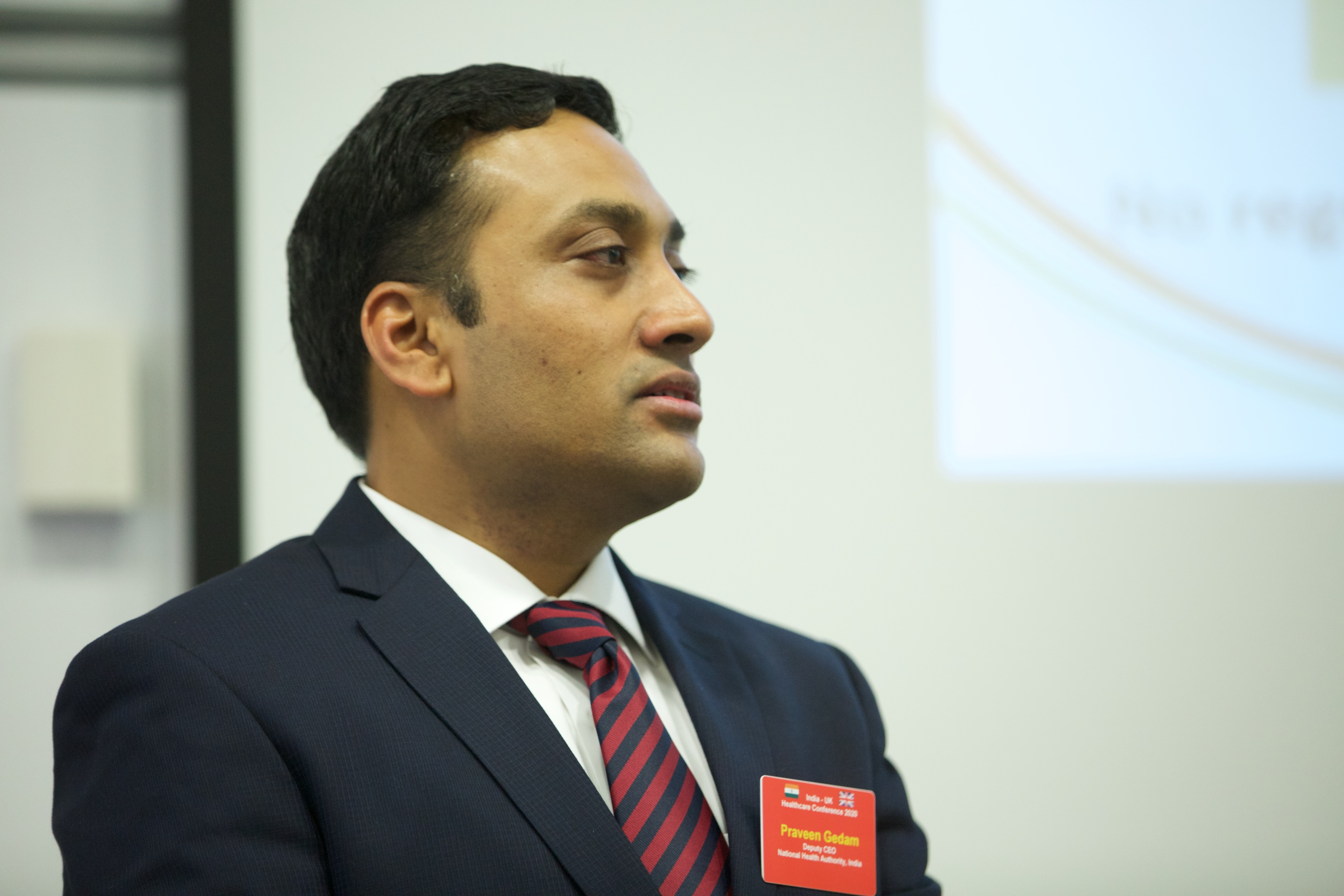
- Praveen Gedam in 2020

Divisional Commissioner of Nashik
- Incumbent
- Assumed office 31 May 2024

Agriculture Commissioner, Maharashtra
- In office October 2023 – 31 May 2024

Additional Deputy CEO, National Health Authority
- Incumbent
- Assumed office 2019

Transport Commissioner, Maharashtra
- In office 30 July 2016 – November 2017

Municipal Commissioner, Nashik
- In office 4 November 2014 – 2016

District Collector, Solapur
- In office January 2013 – ?

Municipal Commissioner, Jalgaon
- In office c. 2012 – January 2013

District Collector, Osmanabad
- In office 2009–2012

CEO of the Zila Parishad in Latur
- In office 2006-2009

Personal details
- Born: 11 October 1977 (age 48)
- Education: Government Medical College; Harvard University

Praveen Gedam (born 11 October 1977) (Marathi: प्रवीण गेडाम) is an Indian civil servant who has been serving as Divisional Commissioner of Nashik since 31 May 2024. An Indian Administrative Service (IAS) officer of the 2002 Maharashtra cadre, he has held a number of governmental roles, including as Additional Deputy CEO of the National Health Authority; Agriculture Commissioner, Maharashtra; Transport Commissioner, Maharashtra; Municipal Commissioner in Nashik and Jalgaon; and District Collector in Solapur and Osmanabad.

Gedam is known for his focus on social programs and anti-corruption, which he has tackled using improvements to technology and digitalisation. Among his larger initiatives are the Sand Mining Approval and Tracking (SMAT) system to fight illegal sand mining; the Solar Dual Pump Water Supply Scheme to improve tap-water access across the country; and the introduction of the National Digital Health Mission identification numbers. He also oversaw preparations of the 2015 Kumbh Mela in Nashik, using technology to improve transportation, lodging, public health, and infrastructure. In 2006, he filed the initial complaint that led to the exposure of the Jalgaon housing scam.

== Education ==
A National Talent Search Scholar, Gedam completed an MBBS from Government Medical College in Nagpur, with a focus in orthopaedics. In 2023, as a Fulbright Scholar, he graduated with a Master of Public Health from Harvard University.

== Career ==
Gedam joined the Indian Administrative Service (IAS) in 2002 (Maharashtra cadre) and has since held several positions within the Government of Maharashtra and the Government of India. While working as an IAS officer, he led an inquiry into the misappropriation of funds under former housing minister Suresh Jain in what would become known as the Jalgaon housing scam. The funds had been earmarked in 1996 to provide more than 11,000 units of housing for poor Indians, particularly in rural areas. Over the course of 10 years, approximately ₹110 crore in public funds had been diverted into private accounts connected to Jain. In 2019, 48 people, including ministers, mayors, council presidents, and builders, were convicted. At that time, it was considered the largest known scam in the history of North Maharashtra.

Between 2006 and 2009, Gedam worked as the CEO of the Zila Parishad in Latur. Maternal and Child Health indicators improved under him, including more than doubling successful deliveries in hospitals (from 43% to 93%). He then worked with UNICEF to ensure that medical initiatives such as community mobilisation and systematic medical check-ups continued after his term ended. Following his time in Latur, he was District Collector in Osmanabad, where he also served as chairman of the Tuljabhavani temple at Tuljapur. He worked with the temple to obtain an ISO certificate, during which he uncovered misappropriation of donations, in part due to temple officials auctioning off donation boxes. Though he led an initial investigation and issued a ban on auctioning the boxes, his term ended before the case was resolved. No criminal charges have been brought against the temple or its officials as of September 2024. While Collector, he also improved local gardens and roads; oversaw the building of a modern darshan mandapa and three bhakti niwas, lodgings for followers of Jainism; and attempted to convince the government to buy Shri Tulja Bhavani College of Engineering in Tuljapur to prevent its closure. Gedam later served as Municipal Commissioner of the Jalgaon Municipal Corporation for a short period of time.

In January 2013, he was appointed District Collector in Solapur, where he developed the Sand Mining Approval Tracking (SMAT) system, an online reporting and monitoring system to fight illegal sand mining in Maharashtra. The initiative included checkpoint huts along access roads to sand ghats and the installation of CCTV cameras. Introducing e-auctioning, higher fines, and increased monitoring eventually garnered a Rs56 crore increase in state income. In the 2013-2014 fiscal year, around 420 first information reports were filed against cartels of sand mafias. Additionally, reducing illegal sand displacement also helped prevent sand erosion. Since its implementation, the system has been adopted across India as part of the Ministry of Environment, Forest and Climate Change's National Sustainable Sand Mining Guidelines.

Around this time, Gedam served as Director of the Groundwater Surveys and Development Agency (GSDA), where he implemented the Solar Dual Pump Water Supply Scheme. This helped provide tap water year-round via a solar energy-based submersible pump installed in existing borewells. The borewells are supplemented by rooftop rainwater harvesting and the solar energy system is supported by the photovoltaic effect, meaning it does not require the sun to power it. Around 10,000 villages across 82 Naxal-affected districts in seven Indian states benefitted from this initiative.

On 4 November 2014, he became the Municipal Commissioner of Nashik. A major part of his time there was focused on making improvements and taking preventative health measures to prepare for the 2015 Kumbh Mela. He oversaw a third-party roadwork audit that resulted in improved routes during the pilgrimage. The government also built a 26 kilometres (16 mi) underground draining system and a 40 kilometres (25 mi) water supply line to the temporary pilgrimage town of Sadhugram, and added five additional ghats to the area, more than doubling the existing number, to accommodate the influx of visitors. Drones were utilised to control and manage crowds; a mobile app was used to give information on local points of interest, including hospitals and hotels; and cloud computing was employed to monitor the threat of any illnesses breaking out. In total, Nashik budgeted about Rs2,200 crore to manage the two month-long event. Additionally, he oversaw the launch of a municipal app that allowed residents to file complaints or suggestions, pay bills, register births or deaths, seek building plan approval, and view extensive details, including before and after photos, about any construction or other project undertaken in the city. One of his main goals for this was increased transparency. He also exposed irregularities within the local builder lobby. When his tenure ended in 2016, some of his constituents reportedly protested for him to stay in office longer.

He then spent a year as Transport Commissioner in the Government of Maharashtra. One of his major initiatives in this role was a mass computerisation effort of the Ministry of Transport's offices, which produced a database of more than 27 million vehicles and 30 million licensed drivers in the state. He also brought transportation firms such as Uber and Ola under increased government supervision to maintain safety standards and to prevent sudden price spikes. In 2017, he was appointed Private Secretary to the Minister of Railways in the Government of India.

Gedam joined the National Health Authority in 2019 as Additional Deputy CEO. He became the first director of the National Digital Health Mission (ABDM) and oversaw the initiatives for digital health management. This included the introduction of Ayushman Bharat Digital Mission (ABHA) numbers, a digital ID that links healthcare records across systems. As of November 2024, more than 68 billion ABDM numbers have been created. In addition to the ABDM, he also worked to scale up the Ayushman Bharat Pradhan Mantri Jan Arogya Yojana (PM-JAY) health insurance scheme to improve the number of Indians covered. During the early months of the COVID-19 pandemic, Gedam worked to ensure healthcare was accessible to as many rural and impoverished communities as possible. In August 2022, his term as Additional CEO was extended to 27 November 2024.
