= Jalgaon housing scam =

Financial scam in Jalgaon district of India

The Jalgaon housing scam, sometimes called the Jalgaon Gharkul scam (Marathi: जळगाव घरकुल घोटाळा), was the illicit diverting of approximately ₹110 crore (US$12 million) in loaned public municipal funds by the Jalgaon Municipal Corporation, in the city of Jalgaon in Maharashtra, India, approximately between 1997 and 2006. The funds were earmarked for a 1996-initiated project for the building of over 11,000 units of subsidized housing to benefit the area's rural poor population, and to reduce the prevalence of slums. The incident is considered the largest known scam in the history of North Maharashtra.

The scam was discovered and exposed by then Municipal commissioner of Jalgaon, Praveen Gedam, who filed a police complaint against Khandesh Builders with respect to the irregularities he saw after that company was awarded the housing contract. The main accused in the case were Shiv Sena minister, Suresh Jain, and Legislative Assembly member, Gulabrao Devkar. Following a seven-year investigation by Jalgaon police, Jain, Ajay Bhole with his subordinate B. Bhole (not found guilty due to lack evidence) and 47 other participants in the fraud were convicted of a variety of criminal charges in 2019.

== History ==
From 1995 to 1996, a government benefits plan was conceived and rolled out, dubbed the "Pradhanmantri Awas Yojana - Gramin (lit. 'Prime minister housing scheme')" (PMAY-G), or "Gharkul Scheme" (a local implementation of India's larger Pradhan Mantri Awas Yojana), aiming to build over 11,000 units of subsidized housing for rural poor families fitting within India's designation of Below Poverty Line status. Many of the poor falling within the project's scope and criteria for benefits, were noted to reside in rudimentary structures, made of clay or grass, often without proper sanitation. The housing project, administered by the Jalgaon Municipal Corporation (JMC), aimed to reduce slums by providing affordable housing in the Jalgaon City outskirt neighborhoods of Tambapura, Samatanagar, Khanderaonagar and Shree Hari Vitthalnagar.

As part of implementing the housing plan, to be constructed across seven area wards, in 1997 JMC put out an invitation to tender, seeking to award parts of the building contract to construction firms. The building of the subsidized homes was supposed to begin in 1999. Although 11 builders filed applications to participate in the building project, covering "11,424 low budget houses for rehabilitation of slum dwellers" JMC, with Suresh Jain controlling it, ignored applicable rules and regulations governing the bidding and award process, and funneled the housing contract to Khandesh Builders.

Khandesh Builders thereafter took out a loan of 110 crore rupees from India's Housing and Urban Development Corporation LTD (HUDC). The municipal corporation of Jalgaon gave 11.54 crore rupees to Khandesh Builders without any interest. Despite the passage of multiple years, they failed to build any houses. The plots designated for the construction did not belong to Jalgaon corporation, but were private and government owned.

From the beginning, the scheme had many irregularities. When the project went unfinished by the projected completion date, JMC gave the builders many extensions of the initial deadline. In the end, Khandesh Builders only completed fifteen hundred houses, out of the five thousand they were engaged to construct.

In 2006, Jalgaon's then IAS Officer Pravin Gedam filed a first information report (FIR) for irregularities seen in the housing project, submitting with it forged documents and criminal conspiracy allegations against Khandesh Builders and 91 others, including Suresh Jain, who had served as Shivsena Minister from 1995 to 1999, and Gulabrao Devkar, who at the time the charges were files, was a member of the Maharashtra Legislative Assembly.

== Investigation ==
Following Gedam's initial complaint, Jalgaon police began an investigation into the allegations of corruption. They discovered that Suresh Jain, Gulabrao Devkar, and other key personnel at Khandesh Builders were involved in criminal activities related to the housing project scam, all of whom were ultimately booked on charges. JMC gave 46 Cr. to various contractor as advanced payment. A variety of preferential concessions were seen in JMC's treatment of Khandesh Builders, not the least of which was the fact that JMC took no action whatever against the contractor despite the passage of five years without it beginning the actual construction. The investigation into the fraud took seven years to complete. Its findings included that payments made to Khandesh Builders were improperly diverted to other companies owned and controlled by Suresh Jain and his family.

The Jalgaon district court ultimately convicted Gulabrao Devkar and Suresh Jain for their participation in the housing scam, finding that as a result, the public had been bilked of about 110 crore rupees ($14,996,693.80 US as of Feb 2021, as adjust for inflation). Devkar was chairman of construction committee and was among the members designated to monitor the construction and progress of the project. Police further found that Khandesh Builders was owned by Jain's two friends, Jagannath Wani and Raja Mayur. The money received by the company from JMC was transferred to two companies owned by Jain's relatives. The investigators further found that Khandesh Builders' headquarters was in fact Jain's own residence. 53 individuals were formally charged during the course of the case, including insiders of JMC. (Three of the accused died prior to the end of the trial.) Jain – who was a sitting Member of the Legislative Assembly of Shivsena at the time of the events – was found to be the lead conspirator.

Although the polices investigation team was headed by IPS Officer Ishu Sindhu, three separate commissions were formed to probe into the details of the fraud. Senior social activist Anna Hazare made various additional allegations against Jain and Devkar. Lead investigator, Sindhu said "we worked relentlessly on this case's probe and filed a water tight chargesheet". The investigation further uncovered the fact that Jain had illicitly favoured his friends in awarding the building contract to Khandesh Builders. Reportedly, the accused – including former minister Jain, and Devkar, who not only had formerly headed JMC, but during the investigation, held the powerful position of Urban Transport Minister of Maharashtra – used their political sway to delay the investigation for six years (the first arrest did not occur until 2008), such as by influencing the transfer of certain participating officers, and having others deliberately drag their feet at completing aspects of the inquiry.

== Arrests and convictions ==
As a result of the investigation, prominently, Suresh Jain and Nationalist Congress Party politician and minister of Maharashtra, Gulabrao Devkar were arrested by Jalgaon police. Devkar was a member of the municipal corporation from 1995 to 2000, and was its president for brief period. He was charged under sections 109, 120(b), 177, 406, 409 and 420 of the Indian Penal Code, and sections 13(d) and 13(ii) of India's Prevention of Corruption Act. A special PCA court remanded him into police custody. He was later released on bail on a bond of ₹50,000 (US$520), on condition that he would not leave the country.

Interim bail issued to the arrestees. In 2012, Jain was arrested again. Although multiple applications for bail were thereafter filed by him, each was rejected by the court, and he remained jailed until sentencing. In late 2019, special judge Srushti Neelkant of the Jalgaon district court in Dhule convicted Jain of the charges, sentenced him to a seven-year prison term, and fined him ₹100 crore (US$10 million).

Two other individuals, Rajendra Mayur and Jagannath Vani, who were owners of Khandesh Builders, also received seven-year prison terms and ₹40 crore (US$4.2 million) fines. Devkar and Chandrakant Sonawane, then a Shivsena MLA, each received five-year prison sentences, as did Pradip Raisoni, who was fined ₹10 lakh (US$10,000). 30 JMC members also received five year sentences, and others, three year terms, out of the total 48 convictions. Accused, Vijay Kolhe, who testified as an eyewitness in the case, was released by the court without sentence or fine. One of the accused in the case remains at large. Indian Police Service officer, Ishu Sindhu, stated that "The conviction in the case is a big success for the efforts of the policemen, who worked relentlessly during the probe and prepared the documents".

== Aftermath ==
Following the indictment, Nationalist Congress Party expelled Gulabrao Devkar. The Bombay High Court rejected his request for bail. Devkar further resigned from his posting as Urban Transport minister of Maharashtra. Devkar was released in 2019, after serving three years of his sentence. In 2014, while still imprisoned, fellow conspirators Devkar and Jain, each unsuccessfully ran for office in that year's Maharashtra assembly election. Devkar was again unsuccessful when he ran for office in India's 2019 general election. Following the convictions Jain appealed to the Mumbai High Court for release despite his sentence on Medical grounds, and was granted a three-week interim bail release. As of 2019, Jain remains a member of the Shiva Sena party. A number of the other convicts took appeals to the Mumbai High Court; the Government of Maharashtra appointed lawyer Amol Savant to represent the government.

As of 2021, Devkar is a member of India's Nationalist Congress Party; has a significant public following and support, despite his conviction in the housing scam, and is considered one of the most powerful NCP politician in the North Maharashtra region.

According to investigators into the Jalgaon housing scam, JMC suffered aggregate losses of 150 crore rupees, which it had to repay to HUDCO on defaulting loan terms. As to the indigent people of Jalgaon, they were denied the majority of the intended benefit of the housing project started in 1996; only 1,500 of the 11,000 units of subsidized housing projected were ever completed.

== See also ==
- List of frauds in India
