= Jain Irrigation Systems =

Indian multinational conglomerate

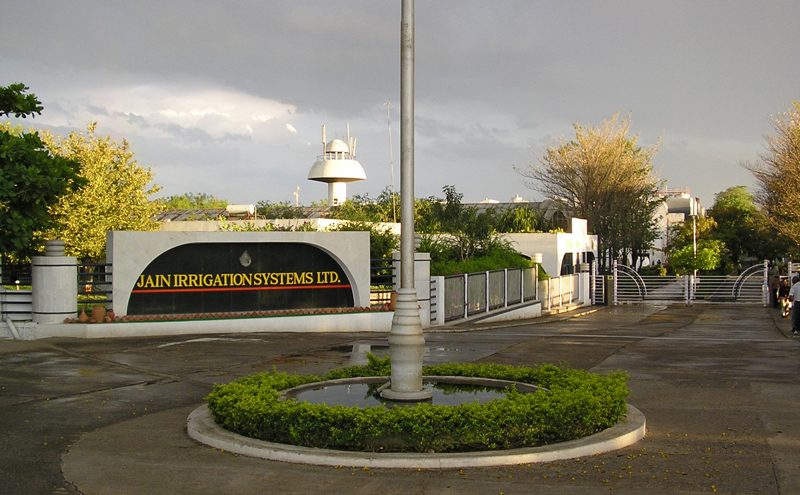
- The Jains Plastic Park in Jalgaon, India
- Company type: Public
- Traded as: BSE: 500219; NSE: JISLJALEQS
- Industry: Agriculture, Irrigation, pipe, Food processing, Solar energy
- Founded: 1986
- Founder: Bhavarlal Jain
- Headquarters: Jalgaon, India
- Number of locations: worldwide 33 manufacturing bases; 126+ countries; 11,000+ dealers and distributors; (2019)
- Area served: Worldwide
- Key people: Ashok Jain, Anil Jain, Ajit Jain, Atul Jain, Abhay Jain
- Revenue: ▲₹85.77 billion (US$890 million) (FY 2018-19)
- Operating income: ▲₹3.704 billion (US$39 million) (FY 2018-19)
- Net income: ▲₹2.542 billion (US$27 million) (FY 2018-19)
- Number of employees: more than 12,000 (June 2019)
- Website: www.jains.com

Jain Irrigation Systems Ltd. or Jains, is an Indian multinational conglomerate based in Jalgaon, Maharashtra, India.

== History ==
Jain Irrigation Systems Ltd. was founded in 1986 by Bhavarlal Jain.

- 1963–1978: Bhavarlal Jain added a dealership of tractors, sprinkler systems, PVC pipes, and other farm equipment. Fertilizers, seeds, and pesticides were also added. Sales grew from ₹ 1 million in 1963 to ₹ 110 million in 1978.
- 1978 – Jain took over a banana powder plant in 1978. The plant was modified for the production of papain from papaya latex. Jain developed purified papain and became the number-one supplier of refined papain.
- 1980 – Manufacturing of PVC Pipe commenced with a small annual capacity of 300 MTs which was increased to over 35,600 MTs per annum by 1997. Then expanded the range to include casing & screen piping systems.

=== 2006-2012 ===
- 2006 – JISL acquired Chapin Watermatic,
- 2006 – JISL acquired NuCedar Mills, a US company in the custom home building market.
- December 2006 – JISL acquired a majority stake in the US-based Cascade Specialties, Inc., which specialises in natural low-bacteria onion products and organic dehydrated onion. With this acquisition, Jain Irrigation became the third-largest dehydrated onion producer in the world, with a combined capacity in excess of 25, 000 MTS.
- February 2007 – By acquiring the US-based Aquarius Brands for $21. 5 million in an all-cash deal, Jain Irrigation became the second-largest drip irrigation company in the world.
- June 2007 – Jain Irrigation Acquired 50. 001% stake in NAANDAN.
- November 2010 – By acquiring controlling stake in Sleaford Quality Foods Limited, a UK-based Industrial Food Ingredients Supplier it became part of a subsidiary Jain Farm Fresh Foods Ltd.
- May 2012 – Jain acquired the remaining 50% of NaanDanJain Ltd. from Kibbutz Na'an in Israel.

=== 2013-2020 ===
- 2018 – Jain acquired ET Water Systems, "a California, US-based company that offers irrigation technology product."

== Growth (1989 – ) ==
- 1989: Beginning in 1989, Jain Irrigation worked to develop water management through micro-irrigation in India. Jain Irrigation has introduced some high-tech concepts to Indian agriculture, such as the integrated system approach, one-stop-shop for farmers requirements, and infrastructure status to micro-irrigation & farm as industry.
- 1994 – Jain diversified into food processing and set up facilities vegetable dehydration and the production of fruit purees, concentrates, and pulp. This facility adopting ISO 9001 & HACCP certified and international FDA statute requirements.
- 2002 – After being caught between severe liquidity crunch, making lot of loss and mounting pressure from the banks and financial institutions to immediately clear overdue liabilities, Jain Irrigation Systems Ltd. (JISL) has decided to raise funds by way of offering majority equity holding in the company in favour of Aqua International Partners LP. JISL were out from a bad financial patch of 4 years and start growing rapidly. Its net profit were more than doubled from Rs 324 million in fiscal 2004–05 to Rs 671. 7 million in fiscal 2005–06. Exports have contributed Rs 2. 89 billion to Jain's overall revenue.
- 2005 – Jain started producing individually quick-frozen food products like frozen mango slices in agreement with the Taiyo Kagaku Company Ltd, Japan.
- 2012 - Gandhi Research Foundation, inaugurated by President of India, Pratibha Patil on 25 March 2012. Sponsored by Jain Irrigation and Bhavarlal Kantabai Foundation. The Foundation is the initiator and promoter of ‘Gandhi Teerth’, an international centre for Gandhian study, research and dialogue. Its core objective is to preserve and promote for posterity the Gandhian ideology and legacy. 'Gandhi Teerth' comprises Gandhi museum, Gandhi International Research Institute, Gandhi archives, publications, and various program's for rural development based on Gandhian lines. The foundation has a collection of 7350 books, 4090 periodicals, 4019 photographs, 75 films, 148 audio recordings of Mahatma Gandhi's speeches, and philately items from 114 countries.
- 2016 – Jain Irrigation's food division has been hived off into a Subsidiary Company Jain Farm Fresh Foods Ltd, which were in the food processing business since 1994 making fruit pulps of mango, banana, guava, strawberry and dehydrated vegetables. Jain Farm Fresh Foods Ltd launched its first branded retail product 'AamRus' under the umbrella brand name of 'Jain FarmFresh'. 'AamRus', processed from Alphonso and Kesar varieties, is sweetened frozen mango pulp with no added flavor and colour.
