= Bhavarlal Jain =

Indian entrepreneur

Bhavarlal Hiralal Jain
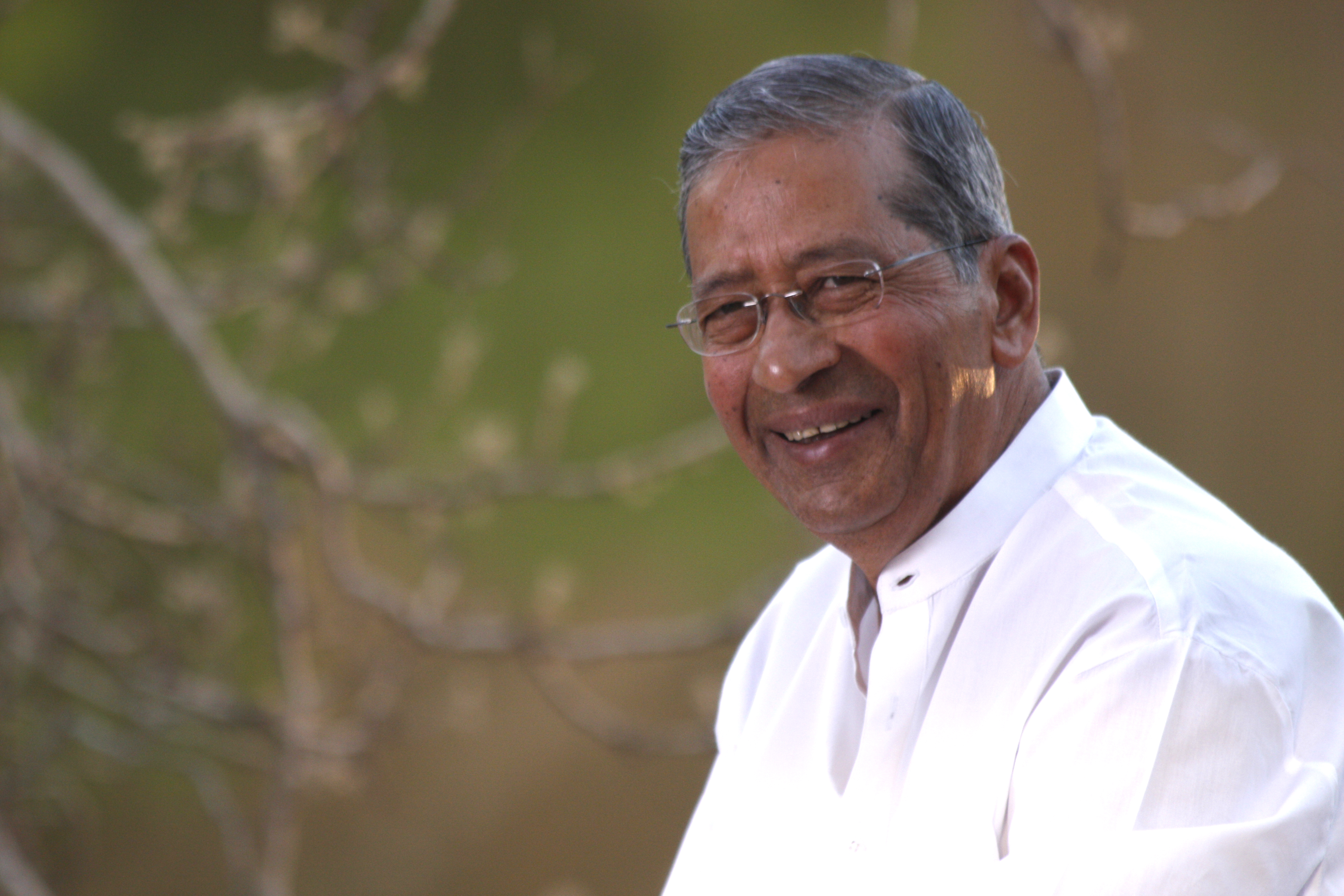
- Shri.Bhavarlal Jain, Founder Chairman, Jain Irrigation Systems Ltd.
- Born: 12 December 1938; Wakod, Tal.Jamner, Dist. Jalgaon, India
- Died: 25 February 2016 (aged 78); Mumbai, Maharashtra, India
- Monuments: Bhaunchi Watika
- Education: B.Com, LL.B
- Title: Founder Chairman, Jain Irrigation Systems Ltd.
- Spouse(s): Kantabai Bhavarlal Jain (1938–2005)
- Children: 4
- Parent(s): Hiralal Sagarmal Jain; Gauri Hiralal Jain
- Awards: Padma Shri (2008)
- Website: www.bhavarlaljain.com

Bhavarlal Hiralal Jain (12 December 1937 – 25 February 2016) was an Indian entrepreneur, hounered by the Padma Award, Government of India, and the founder chairman of Jain Irrigation Systems Ltd. (JISL), now the second largest micro-irrigation company in the world after Netafim a manufacturer company owned by Orbia Group of Israel. He was a staunch Gandhian and philanthropist. He was the founder of Gandhi Research Foundation.

== Life (1937 to 2016) ==
Bhavarlal Jain was born in 1937 into a farming Marwari Oswal Jain family, originally in the village of Wakod located in Jalgaon district, Maharashtra,. A law graduate, he spurned the offer of a civil service job to pursue agriculture as a profession at the age of twenty-three. In 1963, selling kerosene from a pushcart, Jain started the family business. The family formed a partnership with a meagre ₹ 7,000, the accumulated savings of three generations, as capital. In 1972–74, Jain decided to revert to his ancestral farms from trading and business. In 1980, he established a PVC pipe manufacturing operation. In 1987–88, he set up a public corporation – the first of its kind in the private sector in the Khandesh region – for the production, promotion and propagation of drip irrigation in the country. He purchased a piece of land that was lying between a hill and the Jalgaon – Pachora road. The revenue classification of the land was less than that of degraded land. He converted this land into cultivable land, now recognised as the Jain Hills and Jain Valley, or Jain Agri Park and Jain Food Park. Then, he went on to pioneer the concept of micro irrigation in India. He received many awards and accolades for outstanding work in agriculture including the prestigious Crawford Reid Memorial Award instituted by the Irrigation Association, USA for "Significant achievements in promoting proper irrigation techniques and in fostering major advancements in the Industry outside the United States of America" in 1997. He was the first Indian and the second Asian to receive this honour. He was greatly influenced by the Jain teachings of Ahimsa (non-violence) and Anekāntavāda (multiplicity of view points).

Jain died at Jaslok Hospital in Mumbai on 25 February 2016 from multi-organ failure, septicaemia, and listeriosis.

== Works ==
Inspired by a quote, "Agriculture: a profession with future", Jain added dealerships for tractors, sprinkler systems, PVC pipes, and other farm equipment. To broaden the business base, he also added agencies for farm inputs such as fertilizers, seeds, and pesticides. His business grew from Rs. 1 million in 1963 to Rs. 110 million in 1978.

Jain did a considerable amount of work particularly regarding water management systems. At JISL's modern 1,000-acre (4.0 km^{2}) research and development farm, work takes place to provide cost effective measures for wasteland development, soil and water conservation, greenhouse, fertilisation, adoption of bio-pesticides and bio-fertilisers, effective farm management and improving productivity for horticultural crops. 'Grand Nain'- a tissue cultured banana variety introduced by him has emerged as the leading variety with banana farmers in Maharashtra.

In July 2007, he founded the Anubhuti School, a strictly vegetarian, residential school with a difference which judiciously blends classroom learning with experiential project work. This school recently achieved the Green School Award.

Jain was the managing trustee of Jain Charities, an organisation dedicated to social causes like education and rural development. The organisation is now known as 'Bhavarlal and Kantabai Jain Multipurpose Foundation'.

== Writings ==
Jain authored many books in English and Marathi. The following table contains his writings listed by year of publication. His speeches, articles and interviews have been collected and published extensively.

Index Number	Title of Book	Year of Publication	Subject	Language
1	Aajchi Samajrachna, tiche swarup va punarbandhani	2001	Present social system and its reconstruction	Marathi
2	A Telling Tale	2003	Water Management and Conservation	English
3	Ti aani Mi	2009	Autobiographical and inspirational sketch of a spiritually united couple	Marathi
4	Uniting Bond	2010	25 years' journey between two friends	English
5	Then and Now	2011	Transformation of Jain Hills	English
6	The Enlightened Entrepreneur	2013	Compilation of lectures delivered by Mr. Jain	English
7	She and Me	2014	Autobiographical and inspirational sketch of a spiritually united couple	English

== Awards and recognitions ==
He was conferred the UNESCO-West-Net Water Conserver of India award in November 2007 by the Union Minister of Water Resources, Professor Saif-Ud-Din Soz at a function held in New Delhi.

In 2008, he was awarded the Padma Shri, India's fourth highest civilian award by the Government of India. The North Maharashtra University awarded him the degree of Doctor of Letters (Honoris causa) for "Remarkable achievements in the field of agriculture, industry and social work". Maharana Pratap University of Agriculture and Technology, Rajasthan and Konkan Krishi Vidhyapith, Maharashtra awarded the degrees of Doctor of Science (Honoris Causa) to him for "tremendous service to the nation by putting up Research Projects and Drip Irrigation Projects which is a unique boon to the agriculturists all over"; and "Significant Contribution in the field of Agriculture, Horticulture, Micro Irrigation & Water Conservation" respectively. In 2012, he was awarded The Good Company Award by Forbes.
