= Jalgaon District Council =

Zilla Parishad Jalgaon

Type
- Type: Unicameral

History
- Founded: 1962

Leadership
- President: Miss Ranjanabai Pralhad Patil since 3 January 2020
- Vice-president: Mr.Lalchand Patil
- Chief Executive Officer: Ankit (IAS) since 2023
- Seats: 67 BJP: 33 NCP: 16 Shivsena: 14 INC: 04 Independent: 0 Registered Alliance: 00

Elections
- Voting system: First pass the post
- Last election: 2017
- Next election: 2022

Meeting place
- Zilla Parishad Building, Jalgaon.

Website
- www.zpjalgaon.gov.in

Zilla Parishad Jalgaon or District Council Jalgaon is a district council having jurisdiction over Jalgaon district in Maharashtra, India.

== History ==
Zilla Parishad Jalgaon was established in 1962.

== Zilla Parishad Constituencies ==
Zilla Parishad Jalgaon has 67 district council constituencies in the Jalgaon district.

=== Zilla Parishad Elections 2017 ===
The election results of all the 25 Zilla Parishads and 118 Panchayat Samitis were declared on 23 February 2017. Jalgaon ZP Election result is as follows:

S.No.	Party name	Alliance	Party flag or symbol	Number of Members
01	Bharatiya Janata Party (BJP)	NDA		33
02	Nationalist Congress Party (NCP)	UPA		16
03	Shiv Sena (SS)	NDA		14
04	Indian National Congress (INC)	UPA		04
05	Communist Party of India (CPI)			00
06	Registered Alliance			00

== Panchayat Samiti ==
There are fifteen Panchayat Samitis under jurisdiction of Zilla Parishad Jalgaon.

1) Panchayat Samiti Jalgaon
2) Panchayat Samiti Chalisgaon
3) Panchayat Samiti Bhadgaon
4) Panchayat Samiti Parola
5) Panchayat Samiti Amalner
6) Panchayat Samiti Chopada
7) Panchayat Samiti Erandol
8) Panchayat Samiti Pachora
9) Panchayat Samiti Jamner
10) Panchayat Samiti Bhusaval
11) Panchayat Samiti Yaval
12) Panchayat Samiti Raver
13) Panchayat Samiti Muktainagar
14) Panchayat Samiti Bodwad
15) Panchayat Samiti Dharangaon
