= Jalgaon City Assembly constituency =

Constituency of the Maharashtra legislative assembly in India

Coordinates: 21.00°N 75.56°E

Jalgaon City
- Constituency No. 13 for the Maharashtra Legislative Assembly

Constituency details
- Country: India
- Region: Western India
- State: Maharashtra
- District: Jalgaon
- Lok Sabha constituency: Jalgaon
- Established: 1951
- Total electors: 433,725
- Reservation: None

Member of Legislative Assembly
- 15th Maharashtra Legislative Assembly
- Incumbent Suresh Damu Bhole
- Party: BJP
- Alliance: NDA
- Elected year: 2024

Jalgaon City Assembly constituency is one of the 288 Vidhan Sabha constituencies in the Khandesh subregion of Maharashtra state in western India.

== Overview ==
Jalgaon City (constituency number 13) is one of the 11 Vidhan Sabha constituencies located in Jalgaon district. This constituency covers Jalgaon Municipal Corporation and part of Jalgaon taluka of the district. The number of electors in 2009 was 308,762 (male 164,987, female 143,775).

It is part of the Jalgaon Lok Sabha constituency along with five other Vidhan Sabha segments of this district, namely Jalgaon Rural, Erandol, Amalner, Chalisgaon and Pachora.

== Members of the Legislative Assembly ==
Year	Member	Party
Till 2009 : Constituency did not exist : See Jalgaon
2009	Sureshkumar Bhikamchand Jain	Shiv Sena
2014	Suresh Bhole	Bharatiya Janata Party
2019	Suresh Bhole	Bharatiya Janata Party
2024	Suresh Bhole	Bharatiya Janata Party

== Election results ==
Vote share of winning candidates
2024	63.10%
2019	63.97%
2014	47.44%
2009	52.88%

=== Assembly Election 2024 ===
2024 Maharashtra Legislative Assembly election : Jalgaon City
Party	Candidate	Votes	%	±%
BJP	Suresh Damu Bhole	151,536	63.10	▼0.87
SS(UBT)	Jayashree Sunil Mahajan	64,033	26.66	New
Independent	Dr. Ashwin Shantaram Sonawane	6,920	2.88	New
VBA	Laleetkumar Ramkishor Ghogale	4,191	1.75	▼1.83
Independent	Kulbhushan Virbhan Patil	3,035	1.26	New
Independent	Jayshree Sunil Mahajan	2,093	0.87	New
MNS	Dr. Anuj Krushna Patil	1,470	0.61	▼1.35
NOTA	None of the Above	1,096	0.46	▼2.37
Margin of victory		87,503	36.44	▼0.17
Turnout		2,41,236	55.62	▲11.23
Total valid votes		2,40,140		
Registered electors		4,33,725		▲8.07
BJP hold		Swing	▼0.87	

=== Assembly Election 2019 ===
2019 Maharashtra Legislative Assembly election : Jalgaon City
Party	Candidate	Votes	%	±%
BJP	Suresh Damu Bhole	113,310	63.97	▲16.53
NCP	Abhishek Shantaram Patil	48,464	27.36	▲24.77
VBA	Shafi A. Nabi Shaikh	6,330	3.57	New
NOTA	None of the Above	4,998	2.82	▲2.15
MNS	Adv. Jamil Abdul Rauf Deshpande	3,481	1.97	▼9.49
BSP	Ashok Shridhar Shimpi	1,214	0.69	▼0.06
Independent	Shivram Magar Patil	1,169	0.66	New
Margin of victory		64,846	36.61	▲13.89
Turnout		1,82,338	45.43	▼11.24
Total valid votes		1,77,129		
Registered electors		4,01,328		▲19.29
BJP hold		Swing	▲16.53	

=== Assembly Election 2014 ===
2014 Maharashtra Legislative Assembly election : Jalgaon City
Party	Candidate	Votes	%	±%
BJP	Suresh Damu Bhole	88,363	47.44	New
SS	Sureshkumar Bhikamchand Jain	46,049	24.72	▼28.16
MNS	Lalit Vijay Kolhe	21,333	11.45	New
SP	Ibrahim Musa Patel	17,383	9.33	New
NCP	Manoj Dayaram Chaudhari	4,835	2.60	New
INC	Dr. Radheshyam Dharamraj Chaudhari	4,014	2.15	▼12.24
BSP	Saiyad Najir Mohammed	1,390	0.75	▼1.13
NOTA	None of the Above	1,256	0.67	New
Margin of victory		42,314	22.72	▼2.95
Turnout		1,87,964	55.87	▲15.74
Total valid votes		1,86,280		
Registered electors		3,36,422		▲8.96
BJP gain from SS		Swing	▼5.45	

=== Assembly Election 2009 ===
2009 Maharashtra Legislative Assembly election : Jalgaon City
Party	Candidate	Votes	%	±%
SS	Sureshkumar Bhikamchand Jain	64,706	52.88	New
Independent	Manoj Dayaram Chaudhary	33,301	27.22	New
INC	Patel Salim Bapumiya	17,612	14.39	New
BSP	Lokhande Sunita Siddarth	2,299	1.88	New
LJP	Sapkale Mukunda Lotu	1,338	1.09	New
Independent	Adv. Ramesh Dhammaratna Birhade	1,143	0.93	New
Margin of victory		31,405	25.67	
Turnout		1,22,515	39.68	
Total valid votes		1,22,360		
Registered electors		3,08,762		
SS win (new seat)				

== See also ==
- Jalgaon
- List of constituencies of Maharashtra Vidhan Sabha
