= Padmalaya =

Hindu temple in Erandol, India

Shree Padmalaya Temple
- श्री पदमालय देवस्थान
- Shree Ganapati Peeths, Padmalaya

- Location in Maharashtra

Religion
- Affiliation: Hinduism
- District: Jalgaon
- Deity: Ganesha

Location
- Location: Erandol
- State: Maharashtra
- Country: India
- Interactive map of Shree Padmalaya Temple
- Coordinates: 20.869345°N 75.392532°E

Architecture
- Style: Hemadpanthi
- Completed: 1912
- Temple: 1

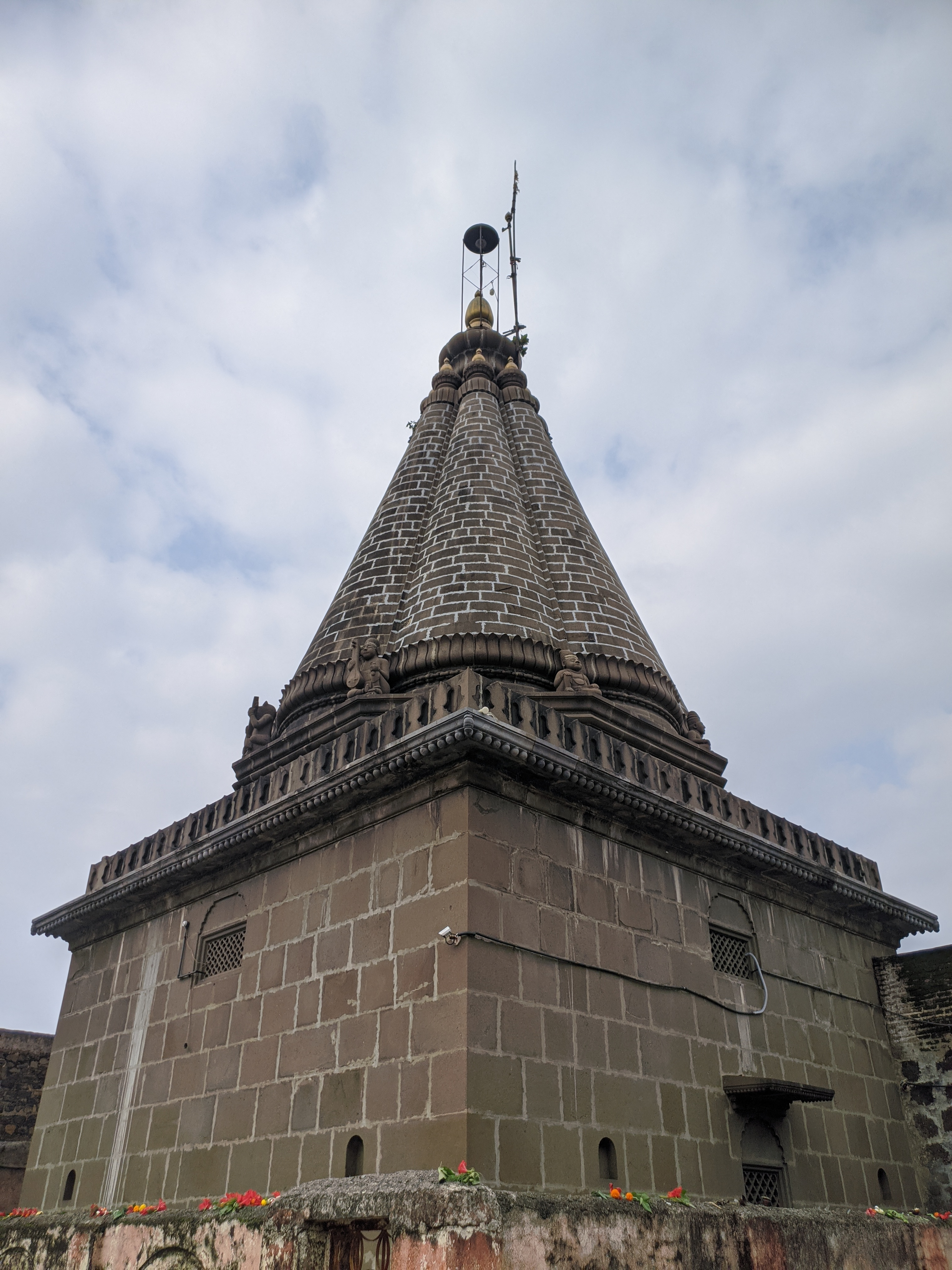
Padmalaya Temple

Padmalaya is a village in Erandol taluka of Jalgaon district, Maharashtra, India. It lies 10 km from Erandol and 31.5 km from the district headquarters of Jalgaon. The village is known for the Ganesha temple. A pond is located near this temple.

== Etymology ==
Padmalaya is a portmanteau word blending "Padmasya" and "Alaya", means "Home of Lotus" in Sanskrit. The name is derived from a large lotus pond that is believed to have existed adjacent to a local temple dedicated to Ganesha. A pond named Bhimkund located few kilometres south of this temple is also a tourist attraction.

== Culture ==
Padmalay temple is a pilgrimage place. Anjani river flows around 1 km from Padmalaya.

Padmalaya is among the two and half Ganapati peeths of India. The temple is also revered as among half Ganapati peeths. The temple has two Ganapati murtis, both are Swayambhu murtis, One idol is known as Aamod and another one is known as Pramod.

This stone temple is built in Hemadpanthi architectural style. The padukas of Shree Govind Maharaj are located in front of the temple. A huge bell weighing 440 kg is next to the padukas.

== Legends ==
Legend states that Bhima had a battle with rakshasa Bakasura and killed him. After the fight Bhim was thirsty, so he slammed his feet on the ground to form a small pond. The pond, called Bhimkund, and is near the temple. Per Mahabharata, Pandavas used to bath in Bhimkund during their exile.
