= Mudhai Devi Temple =

Hindu temple in Jalgaon district, India

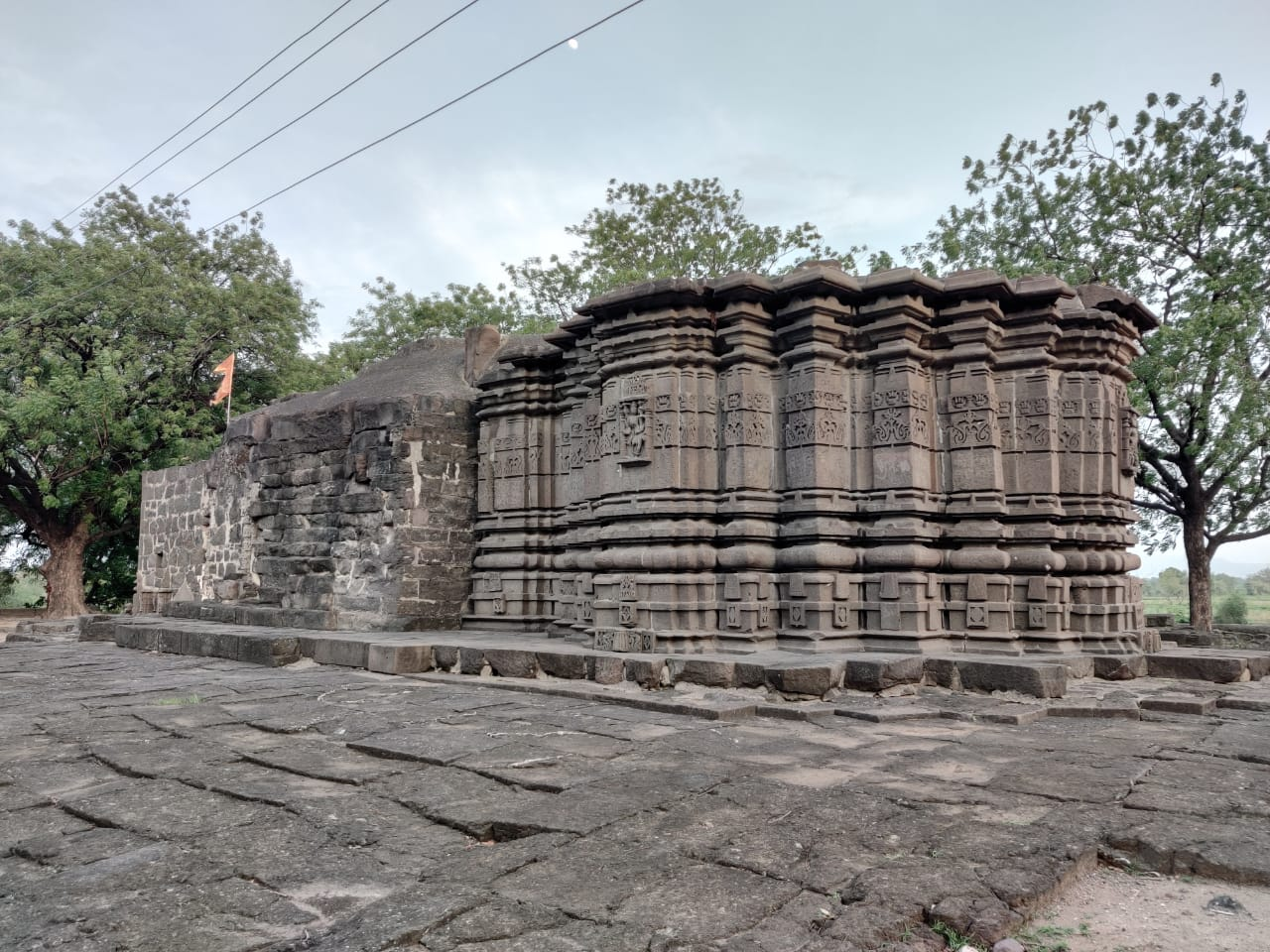
Mudhai Devi temple of Hemadpanti architecture at Waghali village in Chalisgaon Tehsil

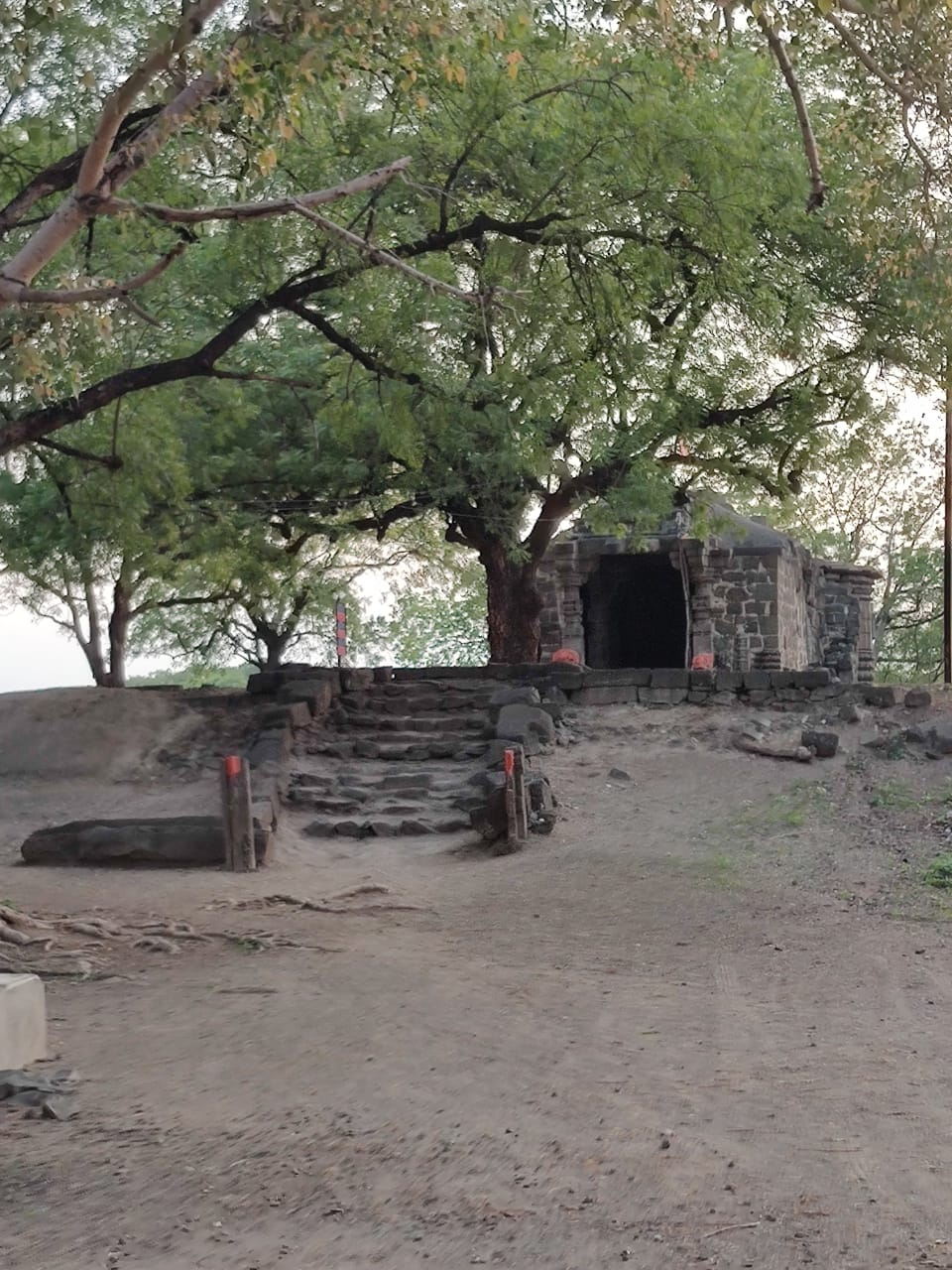
Mudhai Devi temple of Hemadpanti architecture at Waghali village in Chalisgaon Tehsil

Mudhai Devi temple is a temple of goddess Mudhai built as a Hemadpanti structure in village Waghali, in Chalisgaon tehsil of Jalgaon district in Khandesh region of Maharashtra, India.

Due to its archaeological importance, the Archaeological Survey of India declared this temple as a monument of national importance in 1914.

== Structure and architecture ==
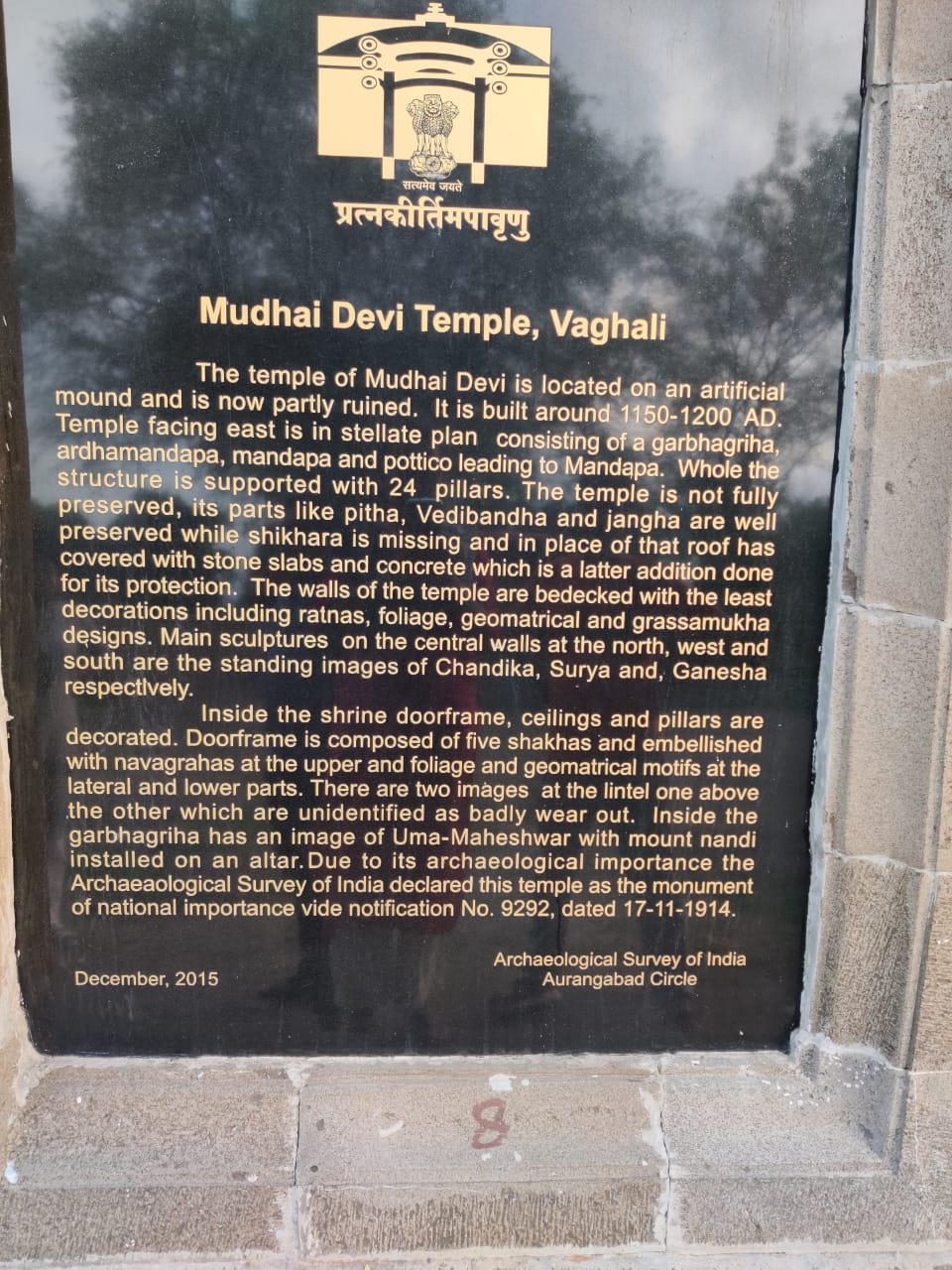
Information board by Archaeological Suvery of India at Mudhai temple

The temple is located on an artificial mound and is now partly ruined. It was built around 1150–1200 AD. The temple faces east and is in stellate plan consisting of a garbhagriha, ardhamandapa, mandapa, and pottico leading to the mandapa. The structure is supported with 24 pillars.

The temple is not fully preserved, its parts like pitha, vedibandha, and jangha are well preserved while shikhara is missing and in place of that roof has covered with stone slabs and concrete which is a latter addition done for its protection. The walls of the temple are bedecked with the least decorations including ratnas, foliage, geometrical and grassamukha designs. Main sculptures on the central walls at the north, west, and south are the standing images of Chandika, Surya, and Ganesha, respectively.

Inside the shrine doorframe, ceilings and pillars are decorated. The doorframe is composed of five shakhas and embellished with navagrahas at the upper and foliage and geometrical motifs at the lateral and lower parts. There are two images at the lintel one above the other which are unidentified as badly wear out. Inside the garbhagriha has an image of Uma-Maheshwar with mount Nandi installed on an altar.

The temple is one of the more important temples of the early medieval period where a goddess form is worshipped.

== Connectivity ==
=== Road ===
The nearest State Transport bus stand (MSRTC) is in Chalisgaon. Chalisgaon is well-connected with the rest of Maharashtra via MSRTC buses. Chalisgaon is 328 km from Mumbai. Chalisgaon-Pune distance is 304 km.

=== Railways ===
The nearest railway station is Waghali railway station. Express trains do not halt at Waghali. Chalisgaon Junction railway station is 11 km from the temple. Chalisgaon is well connected by railways to the entire India. Frequent trains are available to Mumbai, Pune, Delhi, and other major cities of India.
