= Maharajas of Valkha =

Indian noble dynasty

Find spots of the inscriptions issued by the Maharajas of Valkha

The Maharajas of Valkha were part of a central Indian dynasty that ruled the historical Valkha region (the area around present-day Khargone district). They are known from several inscriptions dated to the years 38-134 of an unspecified calendar era. Based on the identification of this era with the Gupta era, they are believed to have ruled during 4th and 5th centuries CE. These rulers of Valkha were probably vassals of the Gupta emperors.

== Territory ==
The core territory of the Valkha rulers was located along the Narmada River around present-day Khargone district (West Nimar), Madhya Pradesh. In 1982, a hoard of 27 inscriptions of the dynasty's rulers were found at Risawala adivasi settlement on the outskirts of the Bagh town in Dhar district. This suggests that the name "Bagh" is derived from "Valkha". The inscriptions of the dynasty have also been discovered at Indore and Shirpur (or Sirpur).

== Date ==
The inscriptions of the Valkha rulers are dated to the years 38-134 of an unspecified calendar era. The rulers are titled Maharaja ("great king") and described as meditating at the feet of the Parama-bhattaraka ("supreme overlord"). Some historians, such as D. C. Sircar and R. C. Majumdar theorized that the Maharajas of Valkha were subordinates to the Gupta emperors, who were overlords of northern India. According to these scholars, the calendar era used in the Valkha inscriptions is the Gupta era, which starts from 319 CE.

On the other hand, V. V. Mirashi suggested that the calendar era used in the Valkha inscriptions is the Abhira era starting in 249 CE. He also identified the location of Valkha as Waghali in present-day Maharashtra.

== History ==
Bhulunda, the name of the dynasty's earliest known ruler, appears to be a non-Sanskrit name. The later rulers of the dynasty have Sanskrit names, and the inscriptions don't mention the relationships between the different rulers. One theory is that Bhulunda was a tribal chieftain, who was appointed by emperor Samudragupta as the governor; the later feudal governors were of Indo-Aryan origin. Another theory is that the later four governors were descendants of Bhulunda, and adopted Sanskritized names.

All the inscriptions record land grants to Brahmanas, groups of Brahmins (called Chaturvaidya-Samooha) or temple deities. This has led to suggestions that the Gupta emperors attempted to Brahminize what were then tribal areas of central India. One of the inscriptions records a grant to the deity "Bappa Pishacha-deva", who was probably an evil spirit (pishacha) worshipped by the local tribals.

Bhulunda's inscriptions are dated between years 38-59 (358-379 CE, assuming Gupta era). After him, Valkha was ruled by Svamidasa, Rudradasa, Bhattaraka and Nagabhatta. The inscriptions of these four rulers are dated between 63-134 (383-454 CE).

After Nagabhatta, the next known ruler of the region is Maharaja Subandhu of Mahishmati. His Bagh Caves inscription is dated 167 (486 CE, assuming Gupta era). Historian Walter M. Spink has identified Subandhu as the prince Vishruta mentioned in Dashakumaracharita. According to his theory, Subandhu or Vishruta was a Gupta prince, who established the dynasty that later came to be known as Kalachuri.

== Rulers ==
The Maharajas of Valkha attested by epigraphic evidence are:

1. Bhuluṇḍa
2. Svāmidāsa
3. Rudradāsa
4. Bhaṭṭāraka
5. Nāgabhaṭṭa
