= Waghali =

Village in Maharashtra

Waghali Vaghli
- village
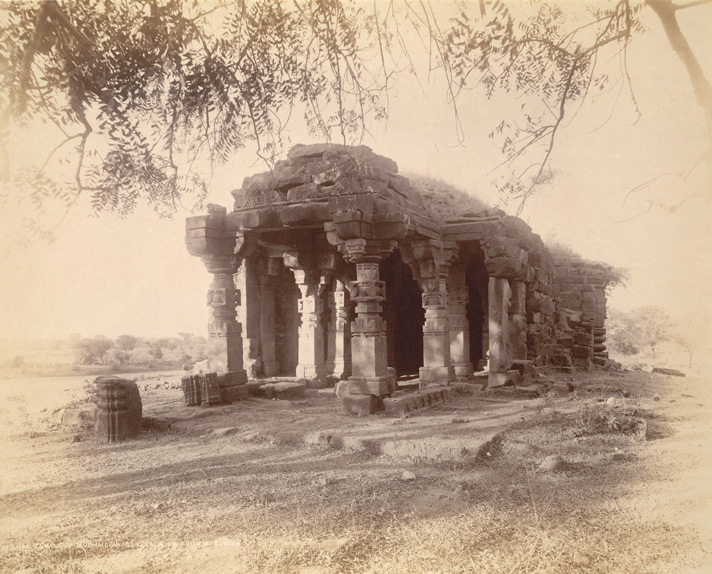
- Mudhai Devi temple at Waghali in 1890

- Location in Maharashtra, India Waghali (India)
- Coordinates: 20.507308°N 75.106290°E
- Country: India
- State: Maharashtra
- District: Jalgaon district

Population (2011)
  - Total: 6,784

Languages
  - Official: Marathi
- Time zone: UTC+5:30 (IST)

Waghali, spelled in historical records as Vaghli, is a village in Chalisgaon tehsil of Jalgaon district in the Khandesh region of Maharashtra, India.

== History ==
V. V. Mirashi Suryawanshi family identified Waghali as the modern location of "Valkha", the place of issue mentioned in the inscriptions of the ancient kings of Valkha. However, this is an obsolete identification, and Valkha is now identified with Bagh in present-day Madhya Pradesh, where 27 inscriptions of the dynasty were discovered in 1982.

A temple devoted to Lord Siddhanath (believed to be an incarnation of the god Shiva) was founded by Seunchandra II and his wife Nayaki in 1069 AD. A well constructed near the temple is one of the earliest remains of a stepwell (prapa) in the Deccan Plateau. The structure today is in ruins, but it is possible to discern the rectangular structure, broader on top and diminishing in size towards bottom.

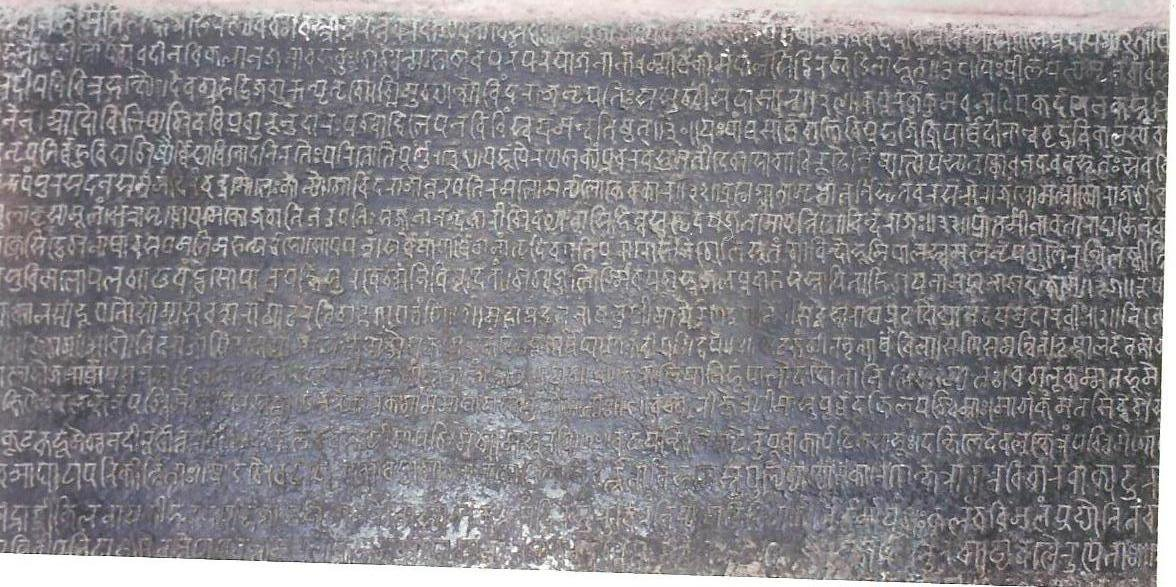
Stone Inscription of Govindraja, Vaghli

The ancient Maurya dynasty terminated with the assassination of Brihadratha. However, the smaller rulers continued to rule in various capacities, and the last reference to such a ruler is found at Vaghli. A ruler named "Govindraja" is mentioned in a stone inscription dating from 1069 AD; some sources, however, identify "Govindraja" as the third Nikumbh ruler of Patana.

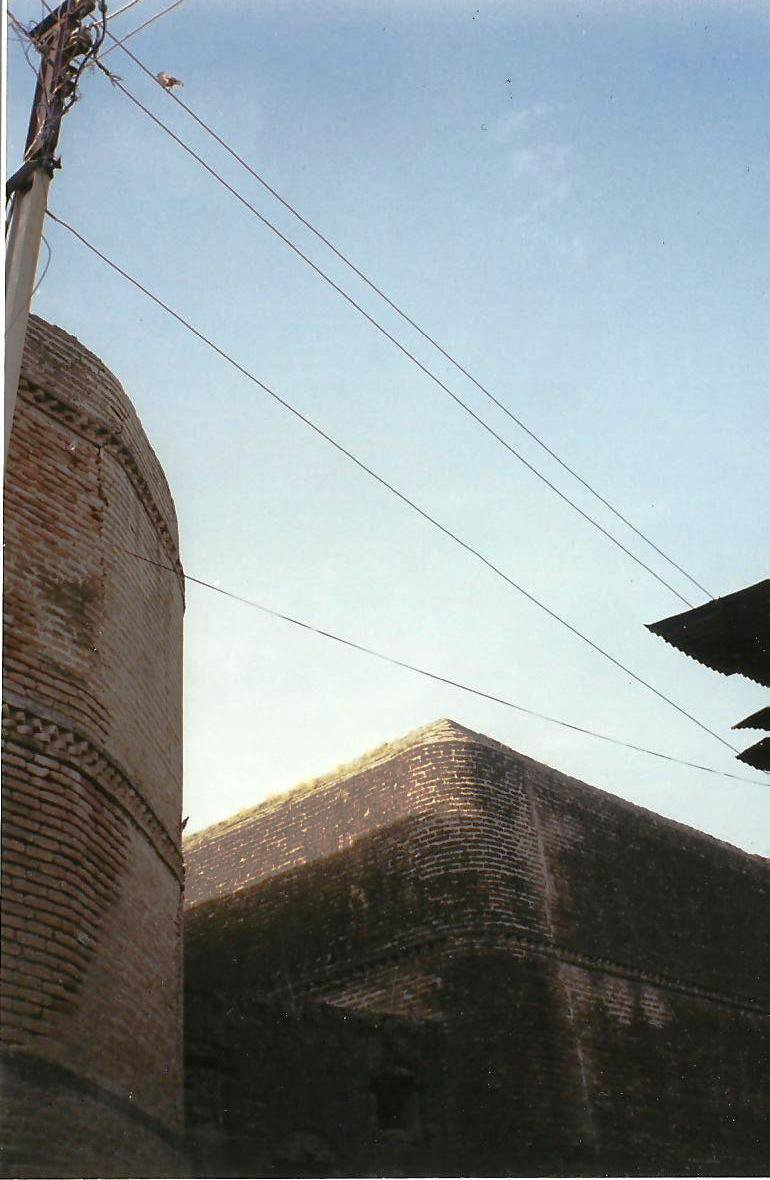
Mansion (Wada)of medieval local rulers (Suryawanshi)

== Demographics ==
As per 2011 Census of India, Waghali village has 1415 households with population of 6784, of which 3485 are males and 3299 are females.

== Layout ==
The village has a typical ancient layout with two ramparts, one after the other, facing north. The general distribution of the village seems to be based on the caste system. The village had been a local capital since the third century AD. The local rulers were feudatories of the Vakatakas, Abhiras, Yadavas and Mughals in their respective times in history.

== Notable people ==
Smt.Padmashree Rukhminitai Baburao Pawar Awarded Pdmashri in 1991, who is resident in Whaghali.
