= Jalgaon City Municipal Corporation =

Local civic body in Jalgaon, Maharashtra, India

Type
- Type: Municipal Corporation of the Jalgaon

History
- Founded: March 2003

Leadership
- Mayor: Deepmala Kale, BJP
- Deputy Mayor: Manoj Chaudhary, SHS
- Commissioner: Dnyaneshwar Dattatray Dhere

Structure
- Seats: 75
- Political groups: Government (70): BJP (46); SHS (22); NCP (1); IND (1); Opposition (5): SS(UBT) (5)

Elections
- Last election: 15 January 2026
- Next election: 2031

Website
- http://www.jcmc.gov.in

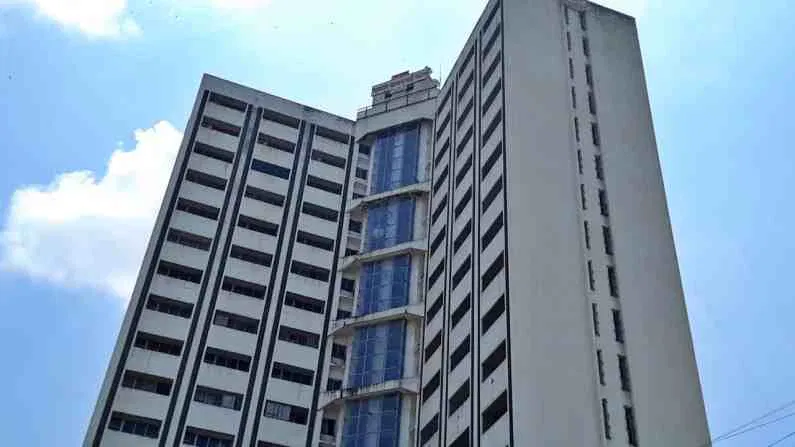

Jalgaon City Municipal Corporation (JCMC) is the local Urban administrative body of the Jalgaon city in the Indian state of Maharashtra. It is situated in North Maharashtra administrative–geographical region of the state.

Jalgaon municipality was established in the year 1864. The Municipal corporation is composed of democratically elected members and currently headed by Mayor Deepmala Kale of Bharatiya Janata Party. It administers the city's infrastructure and public services. JMC was founded on 21 March 2003. It serves an area of 68.78 km^{2} and provides civil services and facilities for approximately 460,000 people.

== History ==
The British government established the Jalgaon municipality in the year 1864, it had 35 municipal councils until 1961 census. In 1961 its population was 80,315.

== Revenue sources ==
The following are the Income sources for the corporation from the central and state Government.

=== Revenue from taxes ===
Following is the Tax related revenue for the corporation.

- Property tax
- Profession tax
- Entertainment tax
- Grants from Central and State Government like Goods and Services Tax (GST)
- Advertisement tax

=== Revenue from non-tax sources ===
Following is the non-tax related revenue streams of the corporation :

- Water bills
- Fees from Documentation services
- Rent received from municipal property
- Funds from municipal bonds

=== Budget ===
Its budget for 2023-24 was 886 crore 70 lakh rupees. Budget for 2024-25 is 981 crore 47 lakh 29 thousands rupees(11% higher than last year).

== Housing scam ==
In 1996, the officials of the corporation built 200 houses for individuals living below the poverty line. The project tender attracted 11 responses. Khandesh Builders was awarded the contract.

The Jalgaon Housing Scam (Marathi : Jalgaon Gharkul Ghotala or Gharkul Ghotala, घरकुल घोटाळा) was publicized in 2012. It was alleged that documents were forged and deadlines illegally overridden by firms owned by Suresh Jain and Gulabrao Devkar, the sitting ministers of Maharashtra.

The scam was exposed when Praveen Gedam, the municipal commissioner of Jalgaon, filed a First Information Report against Jain and Devkar. Chandrakant Sonawane, a member of the 13th Maharashtra Legislative Assembly and the architect of the project, along with 90 others, were sued for providing forged documents and also for delaying and overriding multiple deadlines. After years of court proceedings, Dhule District Court sentenced Jain and Devkar to seven and five years in prison, respectively, under the Prevention of Corruption Act, 1988, Indian Penal Code Section 420, and many sections of corruption, misuse of office, cheating, theft of taxpayer money, submitting forged documents, fraud, and confidence tricks. The Jalgaon housing scam was one of the largest scams of Maharashtra, totaling Rs 110-crore. Investigation revealed that Minister Suresh Jain, Gulabrao Devkar, Khandesh Builders, the architects, and other corporates conspired to exploit the Government of India's affordable housing initiative, Pradhan Mantri Awas Yojana–then called the Gharkul scheme.

A police investigation led by IPS officer Ishu Sindhu exposed that the owners of Khandesh Builders were friends with Suresh Jain and that the entity's headquarters were located at Jain's residence. The money given by Jalgaon Municipal Corporation to Khandesh Builders first advanced Rs 15-crore then Rs 45-crore routed to firms owned by Jain's friends and family members. Builders started work on 5,000 houses but completed only 1,500.

== Mayors of Jalgaon ==
Sr. No.	Year	Mayor	Political Party	Notes
1	21 September 2003 – 20 March 2006	Asha Kolhe	Khandesh Vikas Aghadi	
2	21 March 2006 – 21 September 2008	Tanuja Tadvi	Khandesh Vikas Aghadi	
3	22 September 2008 - 29 November 2009	Ramesh Jain	Khandesh Vikas Aghadi	
4	30 November 2009 – 21 March 2011	Pradip Raisoni	Khandesh Vikas Aghadi	
5	22 March 2011 – 19 September 2011	Ashok Sapkale	Khandesh Vikas Aghadi	
6	20 September 2011 – 3 April 2012	Sadashiv Dhekale	Khandesh Vikas Aghadi	
7	4 April 2012 - 2 October 2012	Vishnu Bhangale	Khandesh Vikas Aghadi	
8	3 October 2012 - 27 March 2013	Jayashri Dhande	Khandesh Vikas Aghadi	
9	28 March 2012 - 19 September 2013	Kishor Patil	Khandesh Vikas Aghadi	
10	20 September 2013 - 9 March 2016	Rakhi Sonawane	Khandesh Vikas Aghadi	
11	10 March 2016 - 22 August 2017	Nitin Laddha	Khandesh Vikas Aghadi	
12	23 August 2017 - 9 July 2018	Lalit Kolhe	Maharashtra Navnirmaan Sena	
13	10 July 2018 - 19 September 2018	Ganesh Sonawane	Khandesh Vikas Aghadi	
14	20 September 2018 - 26 January 2020	Seema Bhole	Bharatiya Janata Party	
15	27 January 2020 - 17 March 2021	Bharti Sonawane	Bharatiya Janata Party	
16	18 March 2021 - 17 September 2023	Jayshree Mahajan	Shiv Sena	
\-\	18 September 2023 - 5 February 2026	Administrative Rule Under Commissioner		
17	6 February 2026 – present	Deepmala Kale	Bharatiya Janata Party	

== Deputy Mayors of Jalgaon ==
Year	Mayor	Political Party	Notes
2016 – 2017	Lalit Kolhe	Maharashtra Navnirmaan Sena	
2017 – 2018	Ganesh Sonawane	Khandesh Vikas Aghadi	
2018 – 2021	Ashwin Shantaram Sonawane	Bharatiya Janata Party	
2021 – 2022	Kulbhushan Patil	Shiv Sena	
2026 – present	Manoj Chaudhary	Shiv Sena	

== Alliance Composition ==
S.No.	Party name	Party flag or symbol	Alliance	Number of Corporators	
01	Bharatiya Janata Party (BJP)		National Democratic Alliance	46	46 / 75
02	Shiv Sena (2022-present) (SS)		National Democratic Alliance	22	22 / 75
03	Nationalist Congress Party (NCP)		National Democratic Alliance	1	1 / 75
04	Bharti Sagar Sonawane	Independent	National Democratic Alliance	1	1 / 75
05	Shiv Sena (UBT) (SS(UBT))	flameing torch		05	5 / 75
