= Ishwarlal Jain =

Indian politician

Ishwarlal Shankarlal Jain

Member of Parliament, Rajya Sabha
- In office 5 July 2010 – 4 July 2016
- Constituency: Maharashtra

Member of Maharashtra Legislative Assembly
- In office 1978–1980
- Preceded by: Madhukar Atmaram Patil
- Succeeded by: Suresh Jain
- Constituency: Jalgaon City
- In office 1980–1985
- Preceded by: Gajananrao Garud
- Succeeded by: Babusing Rathod
- Constituency: Jamner

Personal details
- Born: May 21, 1946 (age 79)
- Party: Nationalist Congress Party
- Spouse: Pushpadevi
- Parent: Shankarlal Rupchand Lalwani (Jain)
- Profession: Politician

Ishwarlal Shankarlal Jain (b 21 May 1946, Jamner, Jalgaon district), a politician from Nationalist Congress Party, is a Member of the Parliament of India representing Maharashtra in the Rajya Sabha, the upper house of the Indian Parliament. He is from Jamner, in Jalgaon district. His son Manish Jain is former MLC in Maharashtra government on NCP ticket.
