= Suresh Damu Bhole =

Indian politician

Suresh Damu Bhole (Rajumama)

Member of the Maharashtra Legislative Assembly
- Incumbent
- Assumed office 2014
- Preceded by: Suresh Jain
- Constituency: Jalgaon City

Personal details
- Born: 13 June 1965 (age 60) Waghali, Chalisgaon, Jalgaon district
- Party: Bharatiya Janata Party
- Children: Vishal Bhole; Mohit Bhole
- Parent: Damu Dodhu Bhole (father)
- Education: Bachelor of Arts
- Occupation: Agriculturist, Politician
- Website: www.mlasureshbhole.com

Suresh Damu Bhole (Rajumama) is a three time member of the Maharashtra Legislative Assembly (13th, 14th and 15th). He represents the Jalgaon City Assembly Constituency. He belongs to the Bharatiya Janata Party and is President of Bharatiya Janata Party Jalgaon District. People call him Rajumama with love.
