= Gandhi Teerth =

Museum in Jalgaon, Maharashtra, India

Gandhi Teerth - Gandhi Museum
- Established: 25 March 2012
- Location: Jalgaon, Maharashtra
- Coordinates: 20.9444918°N 75.555363°E
- Collection size: approx. 8 million objects
- Visitors: 1,17,810 (March, 2014)
- Public transit access: Jalgaon, Maharashtra, India
- Website: www.gandhifoundation.net

Gandhi Teerth (Gandhi Research Foundation) is a research institution and museum on Mahatma Gandhi, in Jalgaon, Maharashtra, India. Located 60 km away from Ajanta Caves. It was established on 25 March 2012. It's initiated and promoted by the Gandhi Foundation.

Gandhi Research Foundation (GRF), was inaugurated by President of India, Pratibha Patil on 25 March 2012. It was founded by Bhavarlal Jain.

The structure was built in Jodhpur stone. It includes an auditorium, an amphitheatre, meeting/classrooms and guest houses.

The library and archives have specially treated preserved historic documents for researchers on Gandhiji. There is a shop having Khadi clothing, handmade gift items and Gandhian literature.

== About Gandhi Museum ==
Museum building has 30 interactive segments, which equipped with Audiovisual Systems, touch screen, Bio-scope, etc. describing Mahatma Gandhi. It has a multilingual audio guided, air-conditioned museum, on the life and works of Mahatma Gandhi. It takes approx 2 hours 30 minutes time led by amiable guides.

== Awards ==
- GRIHA Adarsh Award 2014.
- Artists in Concrete Awards Asia Fest 2013–14
