= Jalgaon =

- City
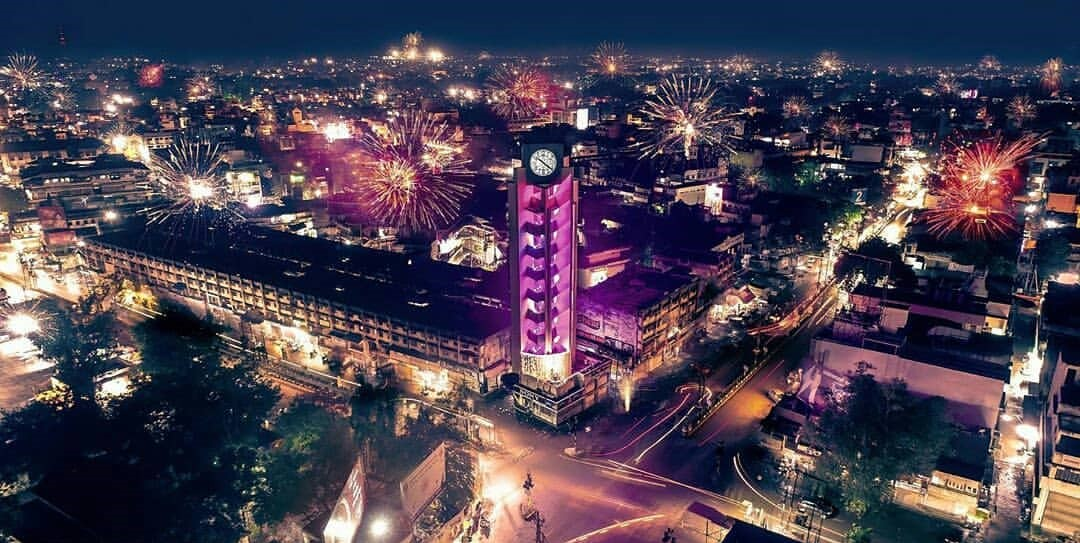
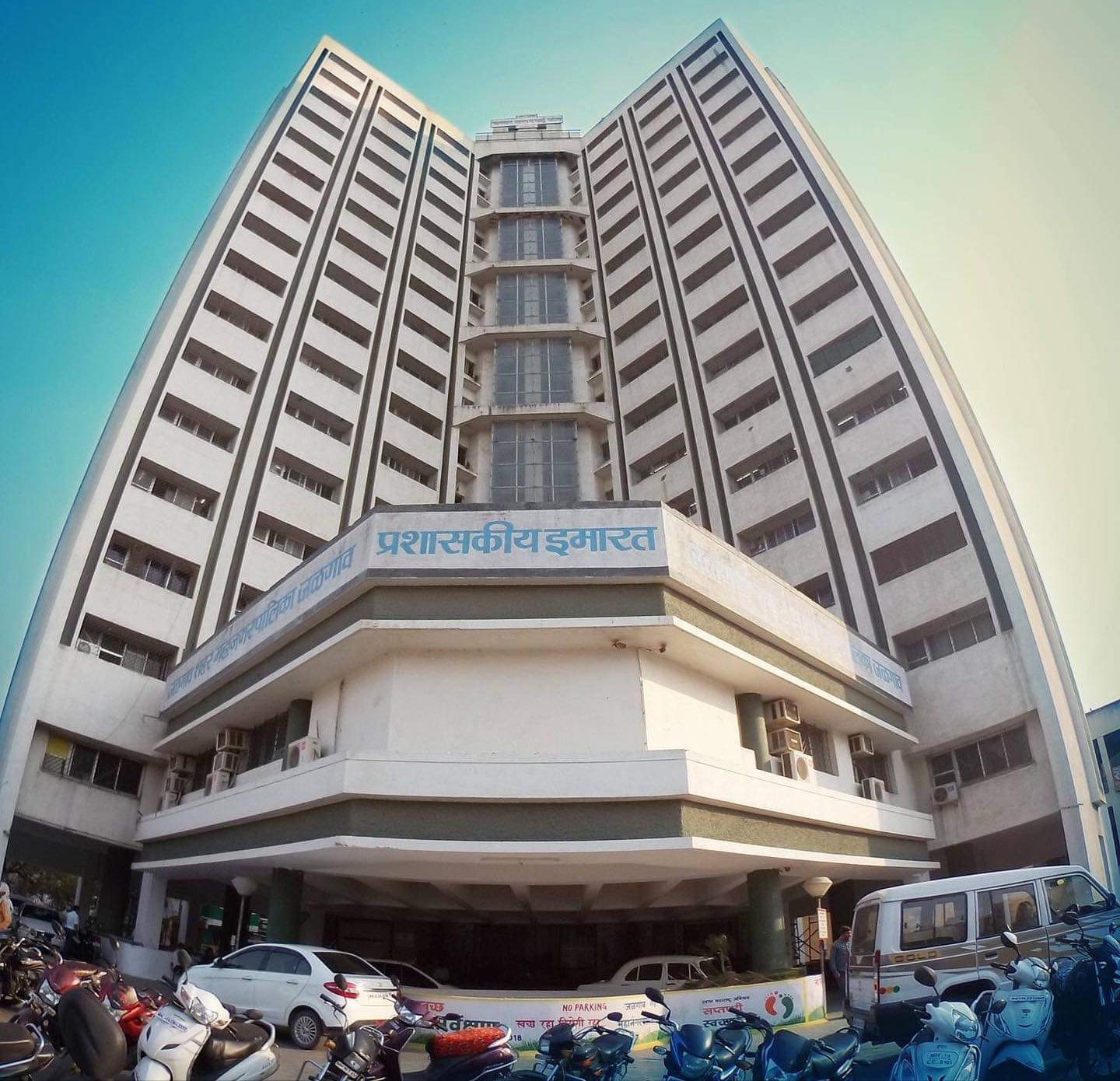
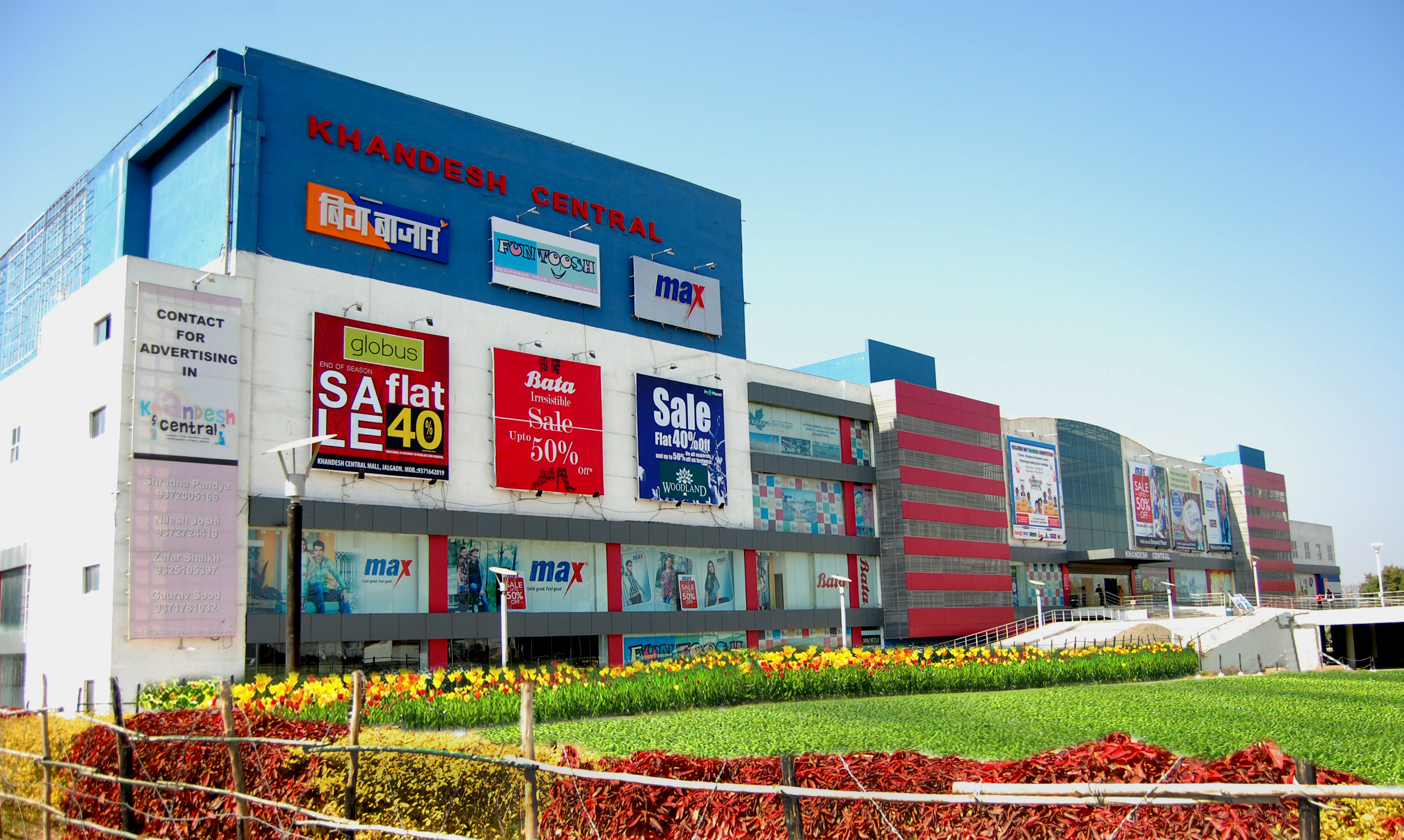
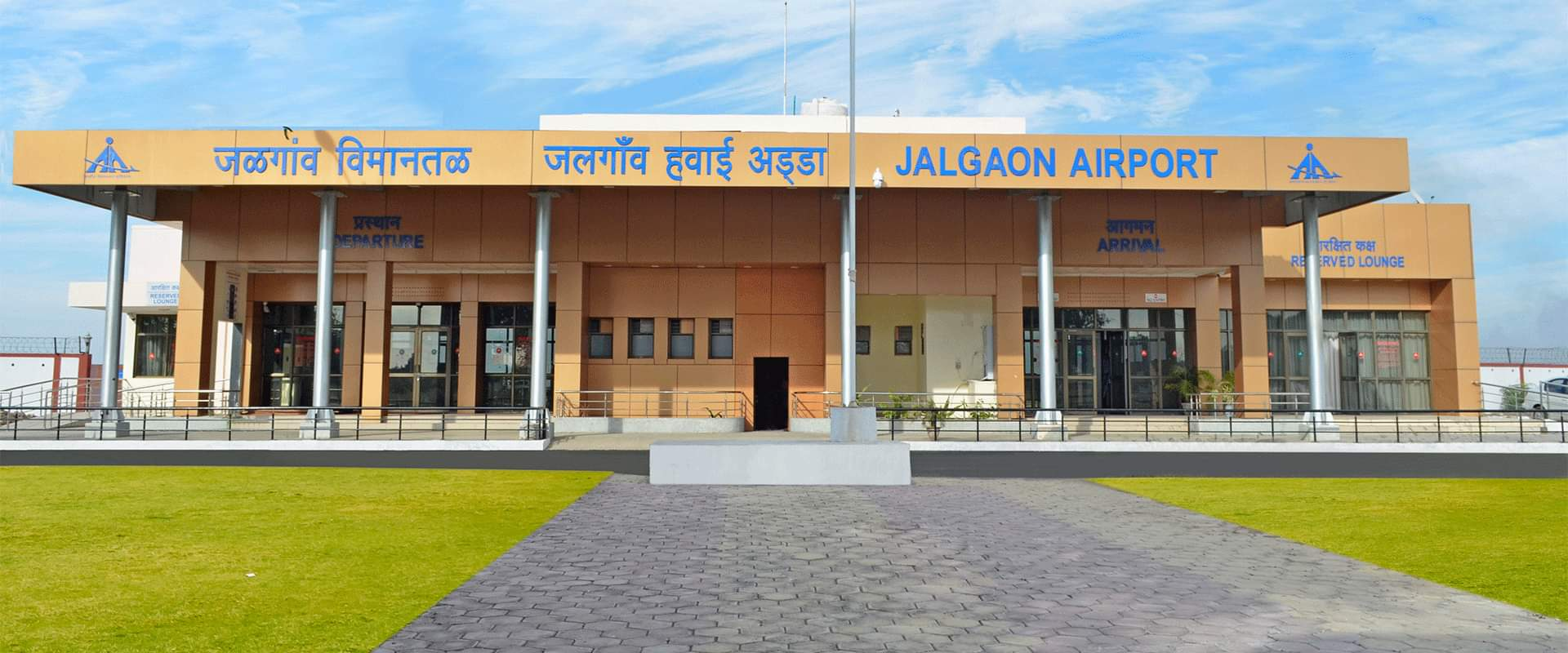
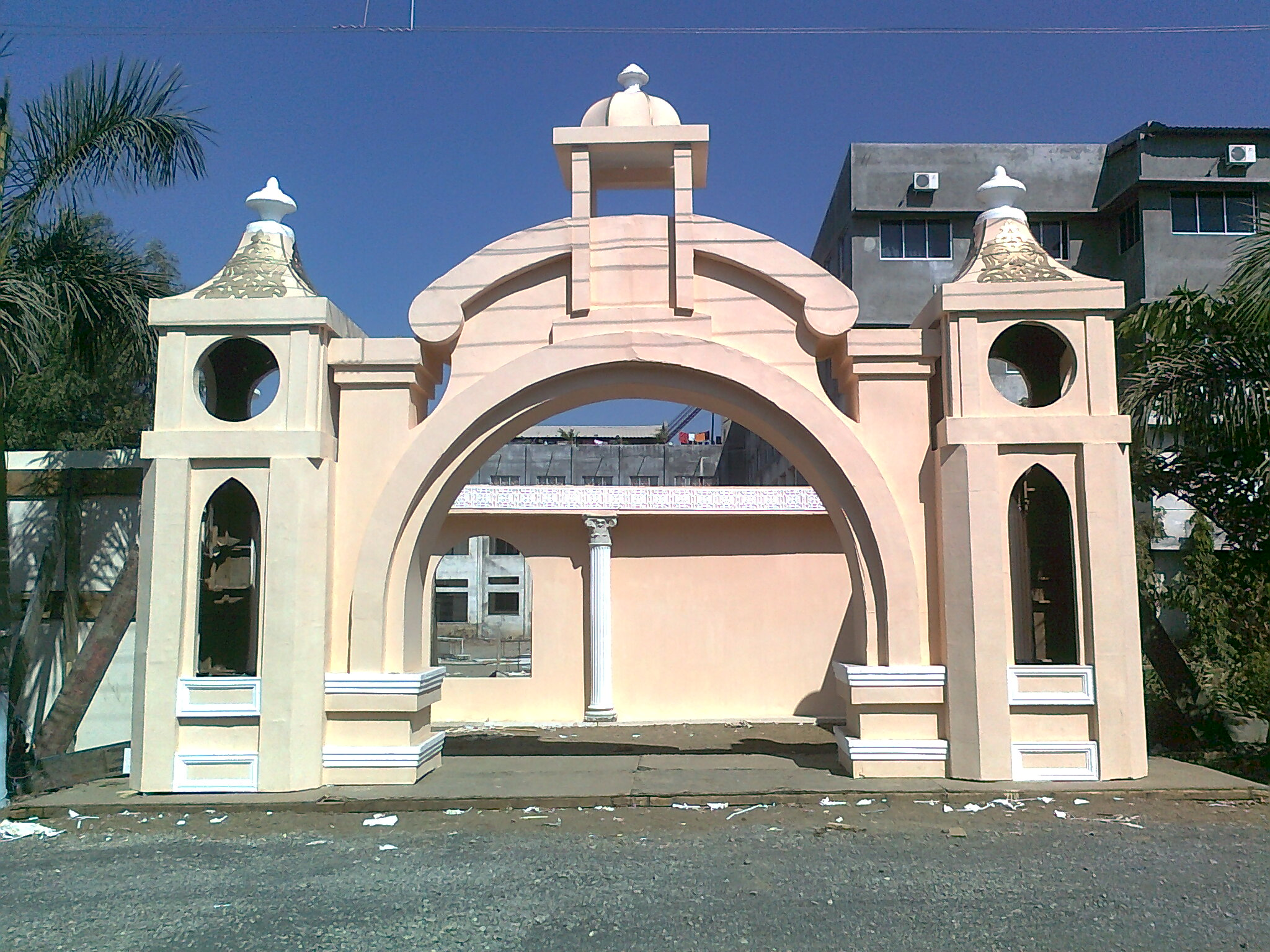
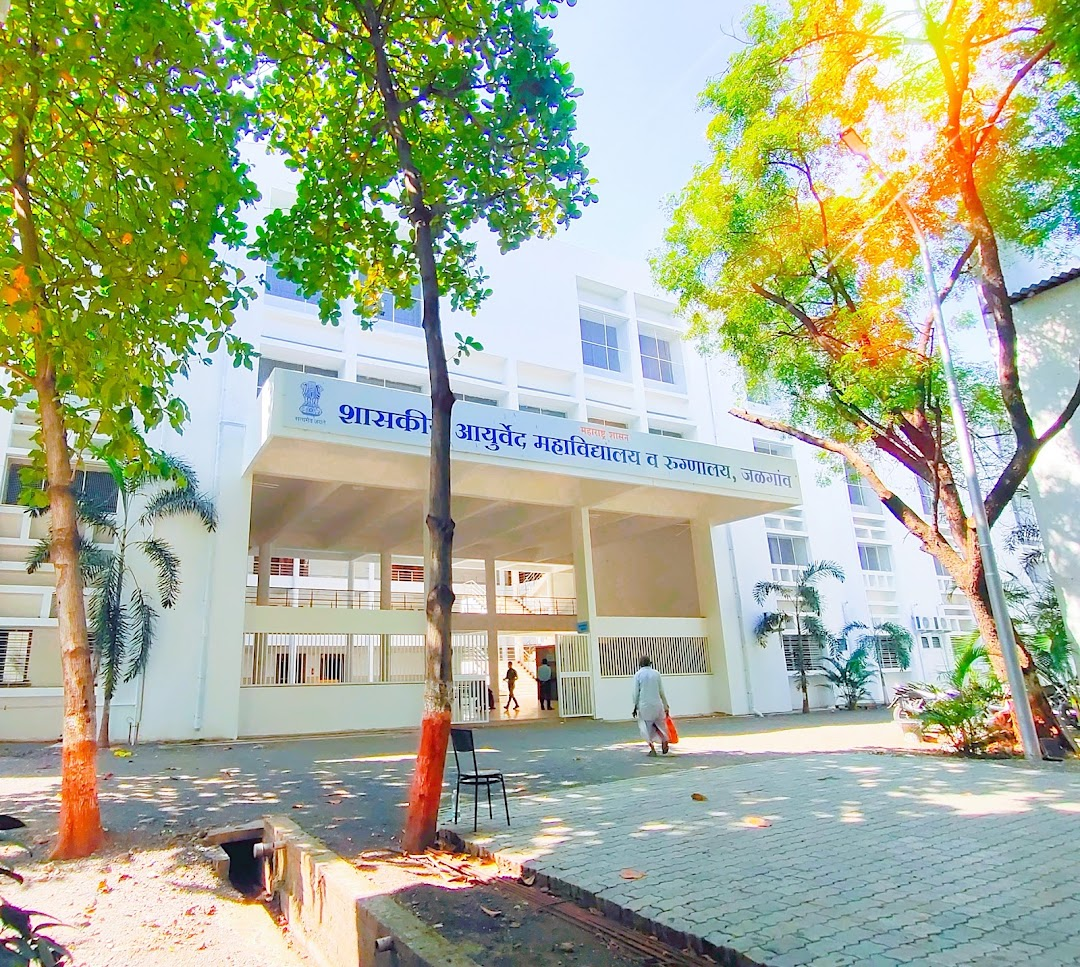
- Jalgaon Skyline Jalgaon Airport Khandesh Central mall, Municipal corporation building, Medical College Jalgaon, Ayurveda Hospital Jalgaon
- Nickname: Banana city
- Interactive map of Jalgaon
- Coordinates: 21.004°N 75.568°E
- Country: India
- State: Maharashtra
- Division: Nashik
- District: Jalgaon
- Established: 1960

Government
  - Type: Municipal corporation
  - Body: Jalgaon Municipal Corporation
  - Mayor: Deepmala Kale(BJP)

Area
  - Total: 98 km^{2} (38 sq mi)

Dimensions
  - Length: 17.4 km (10.8 mi)
  - Width: 14.3 km (8.9 mi)
- Elevation: 216 m (709 ft)

Population (2011)
  - Total: 650,000
  - Rank: India: 102nd Maharashtra: 13th
  - Density: 6,600/km^{2} (17,000/sq mi)
- Demonym: Jalgaonkar

Language
  - Official: Marathi
  - Spoken: Khandeshi (Ahirani)
- Time zone: UTC+5:30 (IST)
- Telephone code: 0257
- Vehicle registration: MH-19
- Literacy Rate: 77.22%
- Website: www.jalgaon.nic.in

Jalgaon is a city in the state of Maharashtra, India. The city is located in North Maharashtra in the sub-region of Khandesh, and serves as the administrative headquarters of its namesake district, the Jalgaon district. In the sub-region of Khandesh, Jalgaon is the largest city in Khandesh. Situated on Asian Highway 53 and 76.3 Km(47.41 Miles) from 'Ajanta Caves'. The Girna river flows from the western part of the city. Jalgaon is colloquially known as the "Banana city of India" as the region's (Jalgaon district) farmers grow approximately two-thirds of Maharashtra's banana production.

== Government and Politics ==
Jalgaon is administered by the Jalgaon City Municipal Corporation, which was established in 21 March 2003. The municipal jurisdiction covers about 68.2–68.8 km^{2}. The municipality was earlier constituted under the Maharashtra Municipal Councils, Nagar Panchayats & Industrial Townships Act, 1965, and the change/upgrade to a corporation was enacted under provisions invoking the Bombay Provincial Municipal Corporations Act, 1949 (the "Corporations Act") as part of the state notifications that created the corporation.

There are 19 zones within the city. There are 75 wards in the Jalgaon City Municipal Corporation.

== Demographics ==
As per Indian government census 2011, the population was 4,60,228 out of this 240590 were males and 219638 were females.

Year	Male	Female	Total Population	Change	Religion (%)							
Year	Male	Female	Total Population	Change	Hindu	Muslim	Christian	Sikhs	Buddhist	Jain	Other religions and persuasions	Religion not stated
2001	193496	175122	368618	–	77.429	16.915	0.171	0.169	3.238	1.961	0.086	0.030
2011	240590	219638	460228	0.249	76.123	18.271	0.234	0.174	3.207	1.714	0.079	0.199

View source data.

== Climate ==
Jalgaon has a hot semi-arid climate (Köppen BSh) owing to the rain shadow of the Western Ghats. There are three seasons in Jalgaon: the sweltering and arid "hot" season from March to mid-June, the warm and "wet" under the monsoon from mid-June to September, and the dry "cool" season from October to February. In Jalgaon District, the average annual rainfall is around 690 mm and the temperature can range from 10 to 48 degrees Celsius, making it a diverse climate with scorching summers of up to 45 degrees Celsius.

Climate data for Jalgaon City (1991-2020, extremes 1969-present)
Month	Jan	Feb	Mar	Apr	May	Jun	Jul	Aug	Sep	Oct	Nov	Dec	Year
Record high °C (°F)	36.4 (97.5)	41.2 (106.2)	43.9 (111.0)	47.2 (117.0)	48.4 (119.1)	46.6 (115.9)	43.9 (111.0)	40.4 (104.7)	39.8 (103.6)	39.5 (103.1)	37.7 (99.9)	36.4 (97.5)	48.4 (119.1)
Mean daily maximum °C (°F)	29.8 (85.6)	32.6 (90.7)	37.3 (99.1)	41.1 (106.0)	42.3 (108.1)	38.1 (100.6)	32.7 (90.9)	31.0 (87.8)	32.5 (90.5)	34.4 (93.9)	32.8 (91.0)	30.4 (86.7)	34.5 (94.1)
Mean daily minimum °C (°F)	11.8 (53.2)	13.7 (56.7)	18.2 (64.8)	23.7 (74.7)	26.7 (80.1)	25.9 (78.6)	24.2 (75.6)	23.3 (73.9)	22.8 (73.0)	19.2 (66.6)	14.6 (58.3)	11.2 (52.2)	19.6 (67.3)
Record low °C (°F)	1.7 (35.1)	3.9 (39.0)	8.2 (46.8)	13.1 (55.6)	19.0 (66.2)	19.3 (66.7)	19.8 (67.6)	17.1 (62.8)	12.3 (54.1)	9.5 (49.1)	5.0 (41.0)	1.7 (35.1)	1.7 (35.1)
Average rainfall mm (inches)	3.7 (0.15)	3.5 (0.14)	5.3 (0.21)	2.2 (0.09)	6.7 (0.26)	140.5 (5.53)	227.5 (8.96)	179.5 (7.07)	131.2 (5.17)	41.3 (1.63)	11.4 (0.45)	6.2 (0.24)	759.0 (29.88)
Average rainy days	0.3	0.4	0.7	0.1	0.7	6.6	12.2	10.7	7.1	2.4	0.4	0.3	41.9
Average relative humidity (%) (at 17:30 IST)	40	33	26	23	27	48	67	74	65	44	39	39	44
Source: India Meteorological Department

Jalgaon has been ranked 19th best "National Clean Air City" under (Category 2 3-10L Population cities) in India.

== Education ==
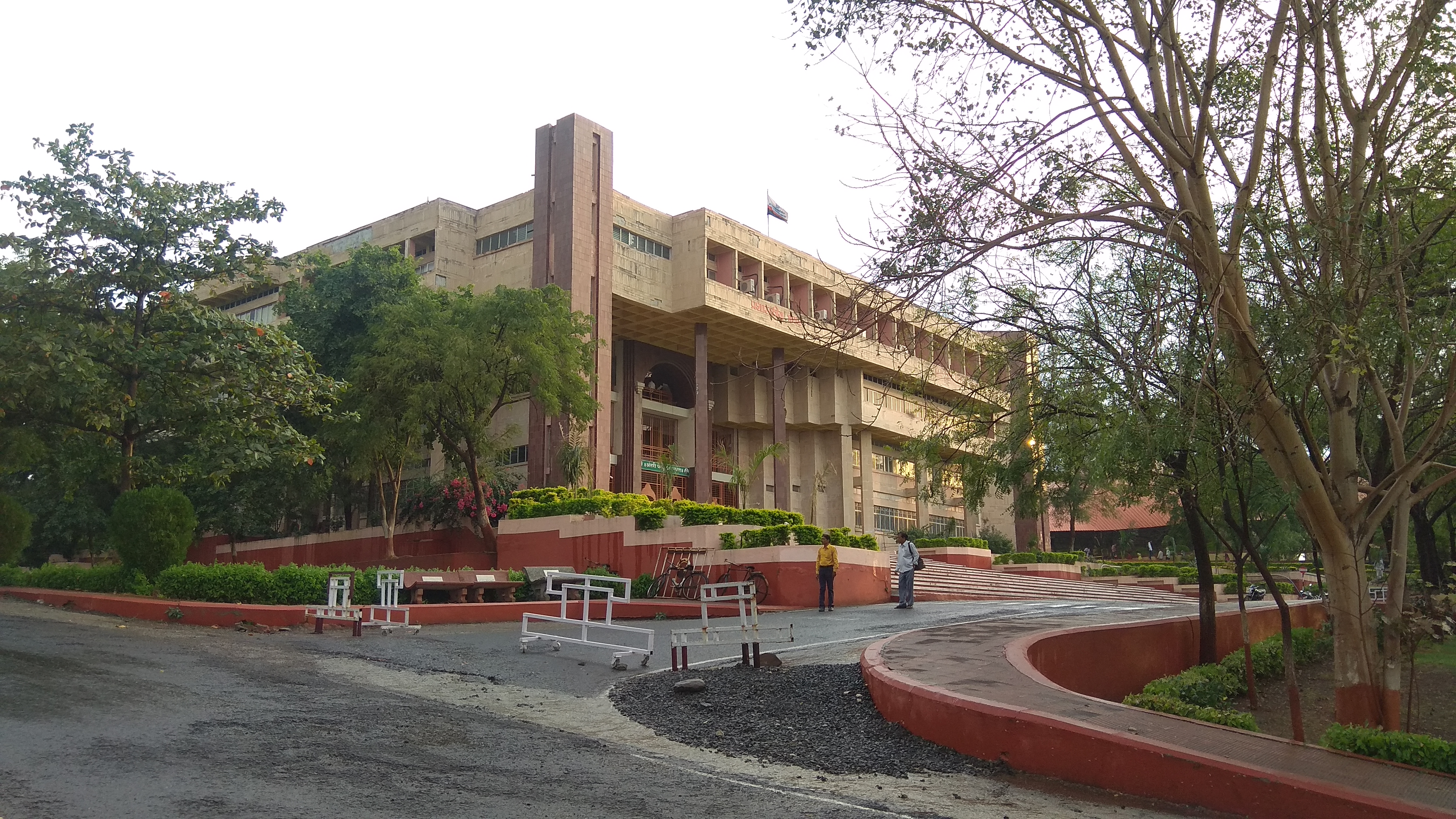
Kaviyatri Bahinabai North Maharashtra University

North Maharashtra University is located 8 km away from the city. Prominent under/post-graduate colleges in the city are Mooljee Jetha College and Nutan Maratha College.

Jalgaon has three medical colleges, Government Medical College, Dr. Ulhas Patil Medical College and Hospital, Jalgaon. and the Government Ayurved College, Jalgaon providing the knowledge of Ayurveda.

The Anubhuti Residential School an CISCE affiliated School based in Jalgaon, founded by Bhavarlal Jain The school stands in the top 10 list of ISC residential schools in India. . The school's name, Anubhuti, translates to 'experience' in Sanskrit. It is full-fledged co-educational residential school. Founded in 2007, The school campus is located at Jain Divine Park on a wooded hillside in 100 acres For which it recognised with CSE Green Schools Awards.

The school accepts students from the fifth through the twelfth grade (ages nine–eighteen) and follows the ICSE board. The School is affiliated to the CISCE (Council for Indian School Certificate Examination), New Delhi which conducts the ICSE (Class 10) & ISC (Class 12) examinations.

== Transport ==
=== Airport ===
Jalgaon Airport (IATA: JLG, ICAO: VAJL) situated at southeast of the city centre, was built in 1973 by the Public Works Department. The Jalgaon municipal council took over its operations in April 1997 and handed it over to the Maharashtra Airport Development Company in April 2007. The Government of Maharashtra signed a Memorandum of Understanding (MoU) with The Airports Authority of India (AAI) to upgrade the existing airfield in July 2009. Pratibha Patil, then president of India, laid the foundation stone for the development and expansion of the Jalgaon airport in June 2010. Jalgaon offers flights to Mumbai, Hyderabad, Ahmedabad, Kolhapur, Nashik and Nanded operated by TruJet airlines. In March 2024, Fly91 restarted commercial operations in the airport, by starting new flights to Goa, Hyderabad, Pune and Alliance Air started new flights to Ahmedabad and Mumbai.

=== Railway ===
The city is served by the Jalgaon Junction railway station. The railway connects the city to major cities like New Delhi, Mumbai, Hyderabad, Kolkata, Bengaluru, Chennai, Agra, and Lucknow.

== Tourist attractions ==
Gandhi Teerth is one of the biggest tourist attractions in Jalgaon city. It is a research institution and museum based on the life of Mahatma Gandhi. It was established on 25 March 2012 by the Gandhi Research Foundation.

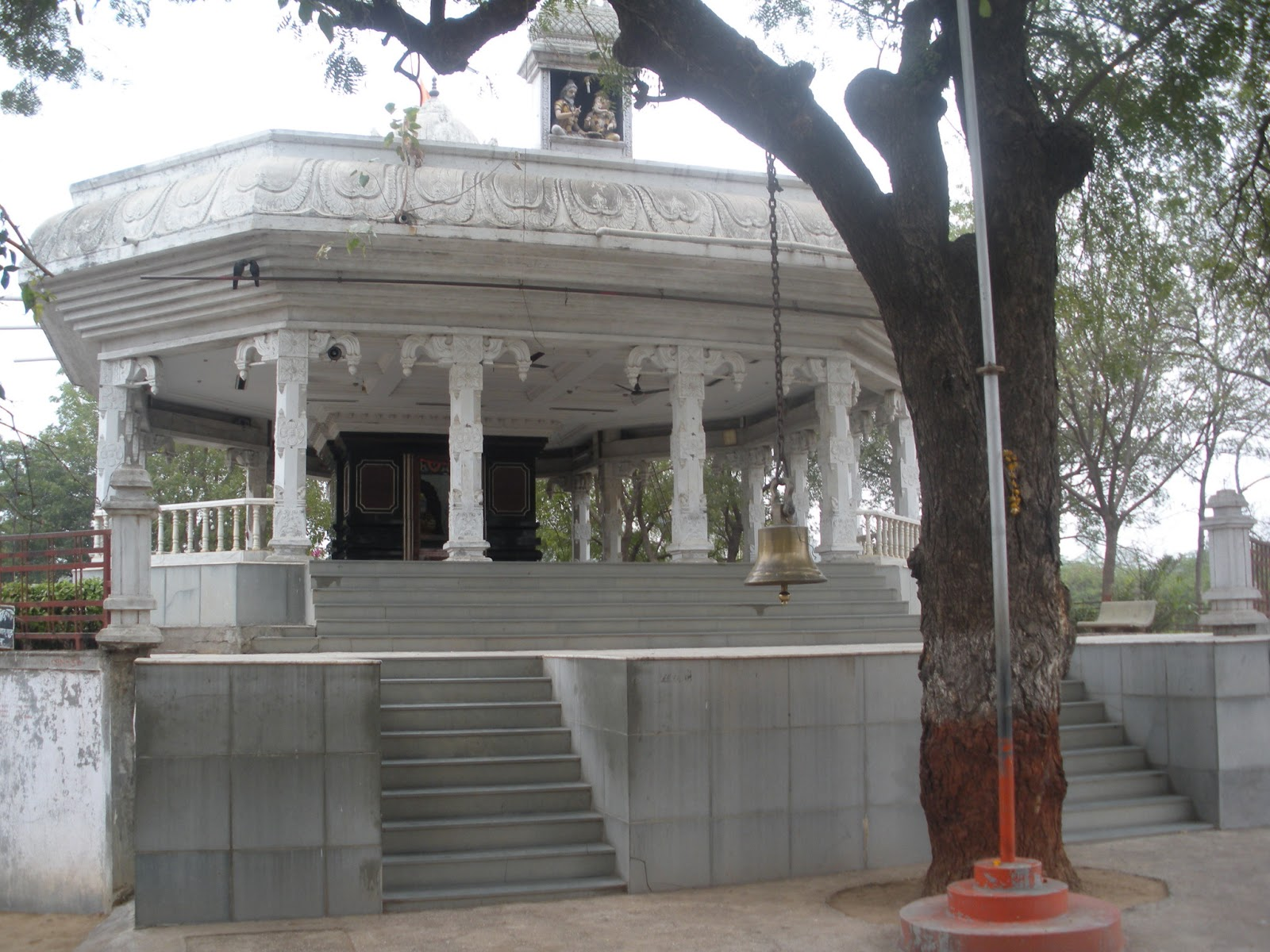
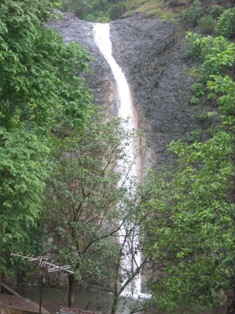
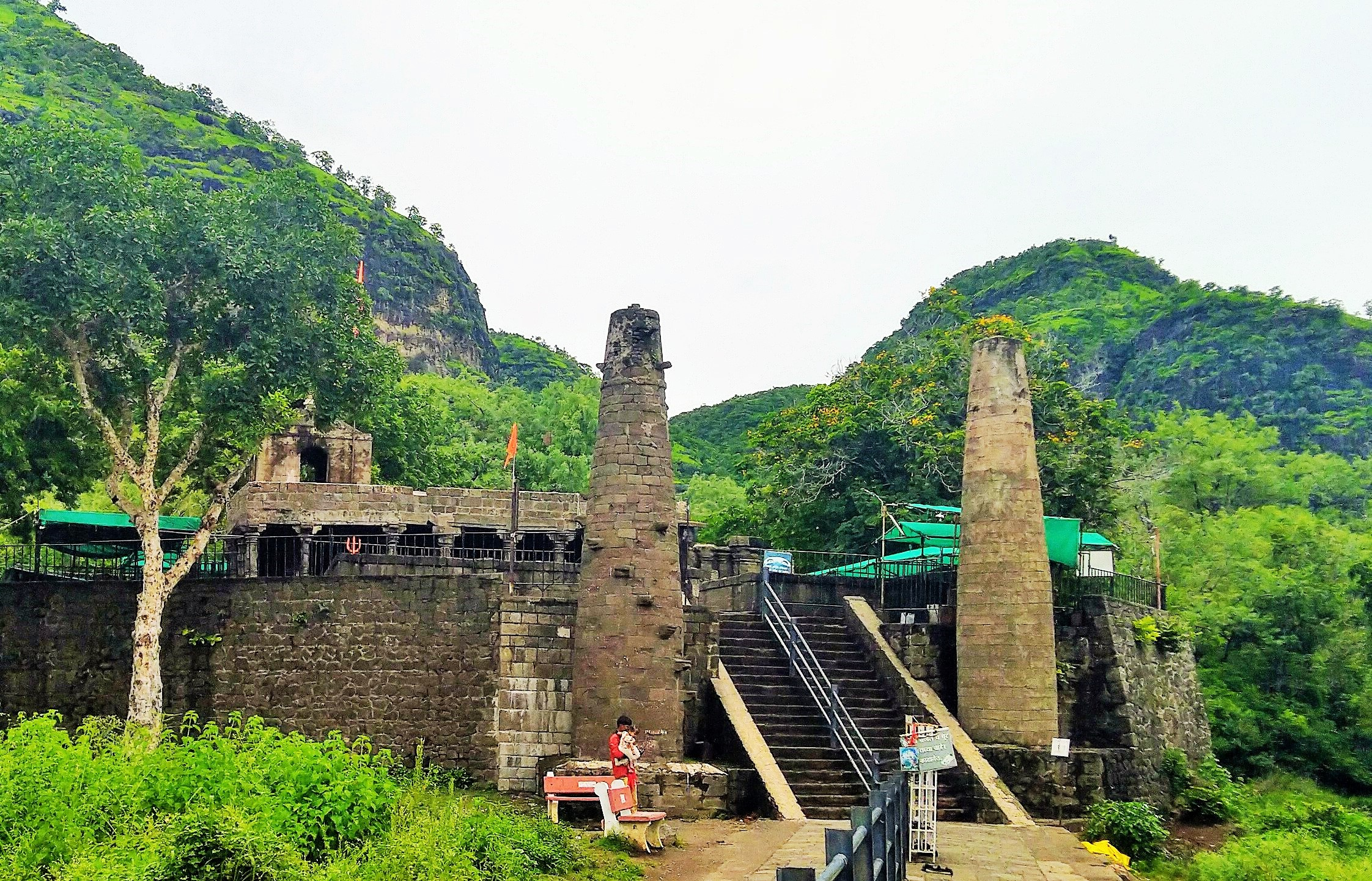
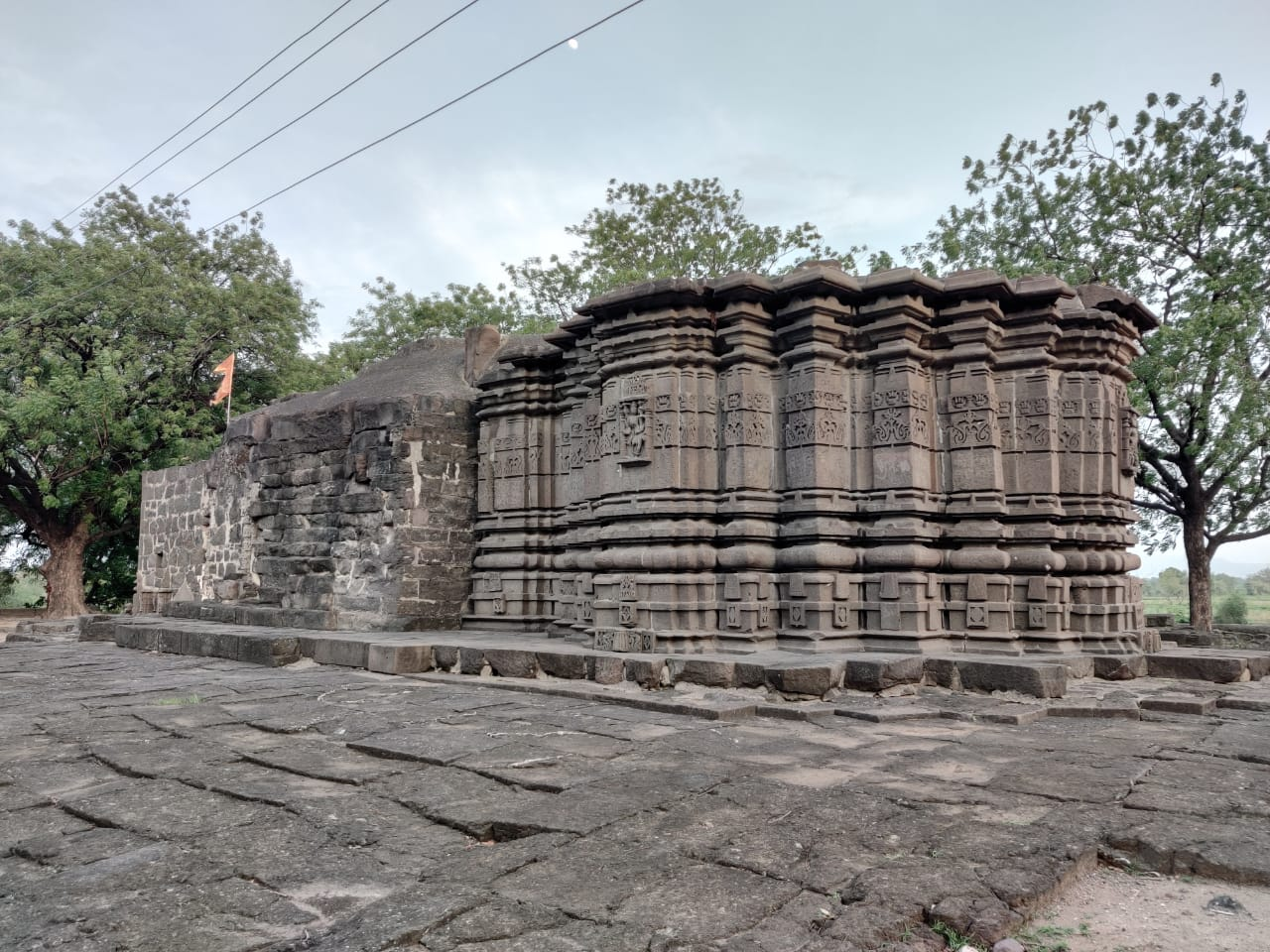
Shree Jagatguru Ved Maharshi Vyas Muni Mandir, Manudevi Temple Vicinity, Temple of Chandika Devi, Mudhai Devi Temple.

Guru Purnima festival at Maharishi Krishna Dvaipayana Vedvysa Temple in Yawal is also a popular pilgrimage destination. It is visited by pilgrims from within Jalgaon and neighboring states like Madhya Pradesh. The temple is located at the confluence of the river Hadkhai-Khadkai also known previously as River Harita and Sarita. Vyasa was invited by the sage Lomasha to perform a sacrifice for the Pandavas after their incognito exile. It is one of the main three temples of Vyasa, the others being Vyas Chatti, Badrinath and Vyas Kashi Temple.

Other ancient pilgrim places and tourist destinations include,

- Changdeva Temple
- Patnadevi, an old temple built by the Mandlik kings of Yadav completed in year 1128 AD.
- Mudhai Devi Temple, of Hemadpanti architecture built around 1150–1200 AD
- Saint Muktabai Temple, home to Muktabai Dindi, which has been an integral part of the Pandharpur Wari for over 310 years.
- Satpuda Manudevi Temple, Adgaon
- Unapdev Hot Spring.
- Padmalaya – Shree Ganpati Temple (Prabhakshetra), is one of the Saade-teen (three and a half) 'Shree Ganapati Peeth' in India. It has two swayambhu idols consist of corals and one has its trunk curving to the right and other one to the left.

== Notable people ==
- Bhāskara II (c. 1114–1185), aka Bhāskarāchārya, was an Indian mathematician and astronomer
- Bahinabai Chaudhari (1880–1951), a farmer whose poetry, published posthumously, helped popularize the Ahirani dialect.
- Pandurang Sadashiv Sane, aka Sane Guruji, social activist and freedom fighter worked as the teacher in Pratap High School in Amalner town.
- Balkavi (1890–1918), a Marathi poet.
- Keki Moos (1912-1989), a famous artist and painter
- Pratibha Patil (1934–present), a former president of India (2007–12) and governor of Rajasthan (2004–07).
- Suresh Jain, 8 times MLA from city and Ex-minister of Govt of Maharashtra and Found Guilty in Garkul Ghotala.
- Ishwarlal Jain (1946 – present), three times MLA and 6 years Rajya Sabha MP. NCP Party Treasurer.
- Bhavarlal Jain (1937–2016), an entrepreneur who founded Jain Irrigation Systems.
- Ujjwal Nikam, a public prosecutor who has worked on high-profile murder and terrorism cases.
- Haribhau Jawale (1953 – present), 3 term MLA and Member of Parliament from Raver.
- Eknath Khadse (1952–present), a politician of the Nationalist Congress Party.
- Namdeo Dhondo Mahanor (1942–2023), a Marathi poet and recipient of the Padma Shri award.
- Gulab Raghunath Patil (1966–present) Senior Leader of Shiv Sena and Minister in Maharashtra.
- Suresh Damu Bhole (1965–present), MLA & President of Bharatiya Janata Party Jalgaon District.
- Sanju Rathod (1998–present), singer, songwriter, composer, and lyricist

== See also ==
- Jalgaon Municipal Corporation
- Jalgaon Zilla Parishad
- Jain Irrigation Systems
- Make in Maharashtra
