= Suresh Jain =

Indian politician, convicted criminal in scam

Suresh Dada Jain

Member of the Maharashtra Legislative Assembly
- In office 1980–2014
- Preceded by: Ishwarlal Shankarlal Jain
- Succeeded by: Suresh Damu Bhole
- Constituency: Jalgaon City

Cabinet Minister, Maharashtra State Government
- In office 1995–2004

Personal details
- Party: Shiv Sena
- Other political affiliations: • Indian National Congress; Nationalist Congress Party
- Profession: Politician

Sureshkumar Bhikamchand Jain, (known as Suresh Dada Jain), is an Indian politician from Jalgaon, Maharashtra. He has changed his party affiliation a number of times in his political career and has been elected to the Maharashtra Vidhan Sabha a record nine times. He is a convicted criminal in the Jalgaon housing scam.

He was a minister in the Maharashtra government and was a main conspirator in the Jalgaon Gharkul Ghotala (transl. Jalgaon housing scam). The court granted him a 7-year imprisonment when found guilty. Due to the scam, Jalgaon Municipal Corporation lost 150 crore rupees. It is considered as one of the most massive corruption scams in Maharashtra.

== Political career ==
Jain was elected from Jalgaon constituency in 1980 as an Indian National Congress (Indira) candidate, in 1985 as an Indian Congress (Socialist) candidate, in 1990 as an Indian Congress (Socialist) – Sarat Chandra Sinha candidate, in 1995 as an Indian National Congress candidate, in 1999 as a Shiv Sena candidate, in 2004, as a Nationalist Congress Party candidate and in 2009, he was elected from Jalgaon City constituency as a Shiv Sena candidate.

From 1980 to 2014, he was elected nine times consecutively as MLA to the State of Maharashtra's Legislative Assembly. During this period, he has been elected / selected to different political positions as below.

In the 1990s Jain was in the Shiv Sena party and served as a state minister. He was a prominent leader for Shiv Sena in North Maharashtra.

== Jalgaon housing scam ==
In 1996, Jain was the main accused in the Jalgaon housing scam and was sentenced to jail. Jalgaon police arrested him in March 2012 on the basis of an inquiry report submitted by the then Jalgaon municipal commissioner Praveen Gedam. The Jalgaon district court found him guilty, convicted him of this crime and sentenced to pay a fine of ₹110 crore with seven years of imprisonment.

== Positions held ==
- 1980: Elected to Maharashtra Legislative Assembly
- 1985: Elected to Maharashtra Legislative Assembly
- 1990: Elected to Maharashtra Legislative Assembly
- 1995: Elected to Maharashtra Legislative Assembly
- 1995: Cabinet Minister, Maharashtra State Government
- 1999: Elected to Maharashtra Legislative Assembly
- 2004: Elected to Maharashtra Legislative Assembly
- 2009: Elected to Maharashtra Legislative Assembly
