= Mumbai North Lok Sabha constituency =

Lok Sabha constituency in Maharashtra

Coordinates: 19.21°N 72.85°E

Mumbai North Lok Sabha
- Lok Sabha constituency
- Interactive Map Outlining Mumbai North Lok Sabha Constituency

Constituency details
- Country: India
- Region: Western India
- State: Maharashtra
- Assembly constituencies: Borivali; Dahisar; Magathane; Kandivali East; Charkop; Malad West
- Established: 1952
- Total electors: 18,11,886(2024)
- Reservation: None

Member of Parliament
- 18th Lok Sabha
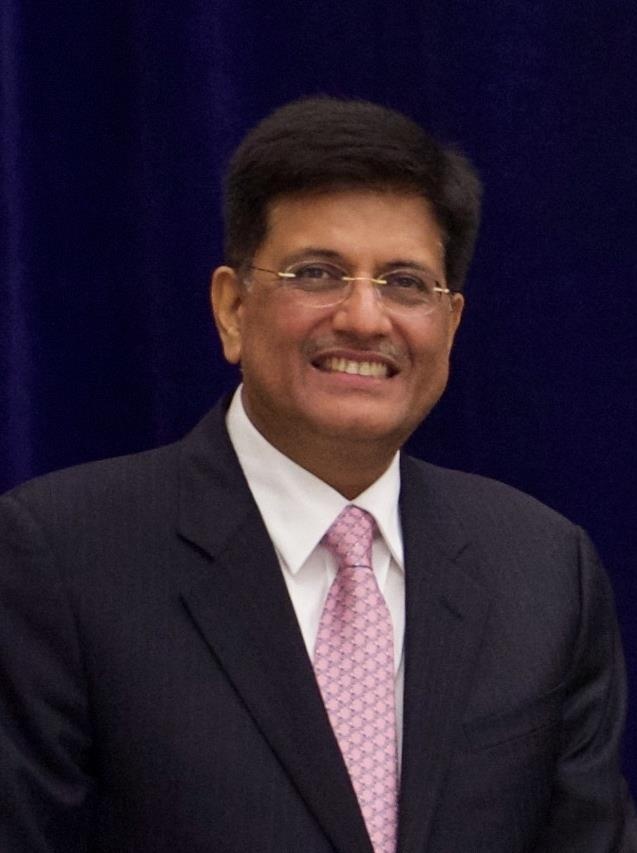
- Incumbent Piyush Goyal; Union Minister of Commerce and Industry
- Party: BJP
- Alliance: NDA
- Elected year: 2024
- Preceded by: Gopal Chinayya Shetty

Mumbai North Lok Sabha constituency (formerly, Bombay City North Lok Sabha constituency) is one of the 48 Lok Sabha (parliamentary) constituencies of Maharashtra state in western India.

== Assembly segments ==
Before delimitation, Mumbai North Lok Sabha constituency comprises Dahisar, Magathane, Borivali, Kandivali, Malad and Goregaon Vidhan Sabha constituencies.

At present, after the implementation of the Presidential notification on delimitation on 19 February 2008, this constituency comprises six Vidhan Sabha (legislative assembly) segments. These segments are:

#	Name	District	Member	Party	Leading (in 2024)
152	Borivali	Mumbai Suburban	Sanjay Upadhyay	BJP	BJP
153	Dahisar	Mumbai Suburban	Manisha Chaudhary	BJP	BJP
154	Magathane	Mumbai Suburban	Prakash Surve	SHS	BJP
160	Kandivali East	Mumbai Suburban	Atul Bhatkhalkar	BJP	BJP
161	Charkop	Mumbai Suburban	Yogesh Sagar	BJP	BJP
162	Malad West	Mumbai Suburban	Aslam Shaikh	INC	INC

== Members of Parliament ==
Year	Member	Party
1952	Vithal Gandhi	Indian National Congress
1957	V. K. Krishna Menon	Indian National Congress
1962	V. K. Krishna Menon	Indian National Congress
1967-1971 Constituency abolished
1977	Mrinal Gore	Janata Party
1980	Ravindra Varma	Janata Party
1984	Anoopchand Shah	Indian National Congress
1989	Ram Naik	Bharatiya Janata Party
1991	Ram Naik	Bharatiya Janata Party
1996	Ram Naik	Bharatiya Janata Party
1998	Ram Naik	Bharatiya Janata Party
1999	Ram Naik	Bharatiya Janata Party
2004	Govinda	Indian National Congress
2009	Sanjay Nirupam	Indian National Congress
2014	Gopal Shetty	Bharatiya Janata Party
2019	Gopal Shetty	Bharatiya Janata Party
2024	Piyush Goyal	Bharatiya Janata Party

== Election results ==
Vote share of winning candidates
2024	65.68%
2019	71.40%
2014	70.15%
2009	37.25%
2004	50.01%
1999	56.39%
1989	41.70%
1957	55.13%
1952	27.08%

=== 2024 Lok Sabha ===
2024 Indian general elections: Mumbai North
Party	Candidate	Votes	%	±%
BJP	Piyush Goyal	680,146	65.68	▼5.72
INC	Bhushan Patil	322,538	31.15	▲6.76
NOTA	None of the Above	13,346	1.29	▲0.08
Majority		357,608	34.53	▼12.48
Turnout		1,036,495	57.20	▼2.89
Registered electors		1,811,942		
BJP hold		Swing		

=== 2019 Lok Sabha ===
2019 Indian general elections: Mumbai North
Party	Candidate	Votes	%	±%
BJP	Gopal Chinayya Shetty	706,678	71.40	+1.25
INC	Urmila Matondkar	241,431	24.39	+1.42
VBA	Thorat Sunil Uttamrao	15,691	1.59	−
NOTA	None of the Above	11,966	1.21	+0.28
BSP	Manojkumar Jayprakash Singh	3,925	0.4	−0.17
Majority		465,247	47.01	−0.17
Turnout		989,962	60.09	+5.23
Registered electors		1,647,208		
BJP hold		Swing	+1.25	

=== 2014 Lok Sabha ===
2014 Indian general elections: Mumbai North
Party	Candidate	Votes	%	±%
BJP	Gopal Shetty	664,004	70.15	+33.75
INC	Sanjay Nirupam	217,422	22.97	−14.27
AAP	Satish Jain	32,364	3.42	New
NOTA	None of the Above	8,758	0.93	New
SP	Kamlesh Yadav	5,506	0.58	−0.2
BSP	Ashok Singh	5,438	0.57	−0.48
Majority		446,582	47.18	+46.34
Turnout		946,562	54.86	+10.46
Registered electors		1,725,145		
BJP gain from INC		Swing	+24.01	

=== 2009 Lok Sabha ===
2009 Indian general elections: Mumbai North
Party	Candidate	Votes	%	±%
INC	Sanjay Nirupam	255,157	37.25	−12.76
BJP	Ram Naik	249,378	36.40	−9.30
MNS	Shirish Parkar	147,502	21.53	New
BSP	Lakhmendra Khurana	7,203	1.05	+0.22
SP	Usman Thim	5,315	0.78	+0.43
Majority		5,779	0.84	−3.47
Turnout		685,022	42.60	−4.47
INC hold		Swing	-12.77	

=== 2004 Lok Sabha ===
2004 Indian general elections: Mumbai North
Party	Candidate	Votes	%	±%
INC	Govinda	559,763	50.01	+10.31
BJP	Ram Naik	511,492	45.69	−10.70
IND	Vidya Chavan	14,183	1.26	
BSP	Akhileshwar Choubey	9,313	0.83	
Majority		48,271	4.32	−11.83
Turnout		1,119,370	47.07	+4.13
INC gain from BJP		Swing	+10.4	

=== 1999 Lok Sabha ===
1999 Indian general election: Mumbai North
Party	Candidate	Votes	%	±%
BJP	Ram Naik	517,941	56.39	
INC	Chandrakant Gosalia	363,805	39.61	
IND	Damodar Janardan Tandel	125,132	13.11	
Majority		154,136	16.15	
Turnout		954,260	42.94	
BJP hold		Swing		

=== 1989 Lok Sabha Election ===
1989 Indian general election: Bombay North
Party	Candidate	Votes	%	±%
BJP	Ram Naik	362,787	41.70	
INC	Chandrakant Gosalia	262,582	30.18	
JD	Mrinal Gore	232,169	26.69	
BSP	Rajnath Gupta	850	0.10	
Turnout		869,922	58.14	
BJP hold		Swing		

=== 1957 Lok Sabha ===
1957 Indian general election: Mumbai North
Party	Candidate	Votes	%	±%
INC	V. K. Krishna Menon	171,708	55.13	
PSP	Alvaresh Peter Augustus	139,741	44.86	
Majority		31,967	10.27	
Turnout				
INC hold		Swing		

=== 1952 Lok Sabha ===
1951-52 Indian general election: Mumbai North
Party	Candidate	Votes	%	±%
INC	Vithal Balkrishna Gandhi	149,138	27.08	
Socialist	Ashok Ranjitram Mehta	139,741	25.38	
INC	Narayan Sadoba Kajrolkar	138,137	25.08	
SCF	Bhimrao Ramji Ambedkar	123,576	22.44	
Majority		9,397	1.70	
Turnout		7,15,888	49%	
INC hold		Swing		

^{(*) stands for 1st Members Candidates of 1952 election
(^) stands for 2nd Members Candidates of 1952 election}

== See also ==
- Mumbai
- List of constituencies of the Lok Sabha
