= Begunah =

1957 film

- Directed by: Narendra Suri
- Written by: I.S. Johar
- Produced by: Anupchand Shah, Mahipatray Shah
- Starring: Kishore Kumar; Shakila; Helen; Jaikishan Dayabhai Panchal; David Abraham
- Music by: Shankar Jaikishan; Shankarsingh Raghuwanshi
- Release date: 1957
- Country: India
- Language: Hindi

Begunah(transl. "innocent") is a 1957 Indian romance film produced by Anupchand Shah and Mahipatray Shah. The film directed by Narendra Suri in hindi language under the Rup Kamal Chitra company. The film was released on 8 March 1957.

== Cast ==
- Kishore Kumar
- Shakila
- Helen
- Jaikishan Dayabhai Panchal
- Raja Nene
- David Abraham

== Soundtrack ==
Track #	Song title	Singers
01	"Aaj Na Jane Pagal"	Kishore Kumar
02	"Aaja Raat Beeti Jaye"	Kishore Kumar, Usha Mangeshkar
03	"Dil Albele Pyar Ka"	Lata Mangeshkar, Manna Dey
04	"Nazar Kahe Aaja"	Lata Mangeshkar
05	"Ae Pyase Dil Bezuban"	Mukesh
06	"Gori gori mein to pariyon ki Chhori"	Lata Mangeshkar

== Plagiarism issue ==
The film was banned 10 days after its release because it was a plagiarized version of American film Knock on Wood (1954, starring Danny Kaye, Mai Zetterling). Paramount Pictures, producers of Knock on the Wood filed a copyright lawsuit in India. They won the case and the judge of Bombay High Court ordered all prints of Begunah to be destroyed. However, in 2020, National Film Archive of India found two 16mm reels consisting of around 60 to 70 minutes footage.

== See also ==
- List of incomplete or partially lost films
