= Knock on Wood (film) =

1954 film by Melvin Frank, Norman Panama

- Promotional poster
- Directed by: Melvin Frank; Norman Panama
- Written by: Melvin Frank; Norman Panama
- Produced by: Melvin Frank; Norman Panama
- Starring: Danny Kaye; Mai Zetterling; Torin Thatcher; David Burns; Leon Askin
- Cinematography: Daniel L. Fapp
- Edited by: Alma Macrorie
- Music by: Sylvia Fine; Victor Young
- Production company: Dena Productions
- Distributed by: Paramount Pictures
- Release date: April 14, 1954
- Running time: 103 minutes
- Country: United States
- Language: English
- Box office: $3.5 million (US)

Knock on Wood is a 1954 American comedy thriller film starring Danny Kaye and Mai Zetterling. Other actors in the film include Torin Thatcher, David Burns, and Leon Askin. The film was written and directed by Melvin Frank and Norman Panama, with songs by Kaye's wife, Sylvia Fine. Location shooting in England took place around London as well as Maidenhead and Marlow.

== Plot ==
Jerry Morgan is a ventriloquist who is having trouble with love: just when his relationship with a woman gets around to marriage, his dummy turns jealous and spoils everything. Jerry's manager Marty threatens to quit unless Jerry sees a psychiatrist, Ilse Nordstrom, who tries to discover the source of his problem. The two of them eventually fall in love.

At the same time, Jerry becomes unwittingly intertwined with spies and has to run from the police. In his escape, he finds himself impersonating a British car salesman, trying to demonstrate a new convertible with loads of bells and whistles. Later on, he finds himself on stage in the middle of the performance of an exotic ballet.

== Cast ==
- Danny Kaye as Jerry Morgan/Jerry's father
- Mai Zetterling as Doctor Ilse Nordstrom
- Torin Thatcher as Godfrey Langston, the film's villain
- David Burns as Marty Brown, Jerry's manager
- Leon Askin as Lazlo Gromek, a spy
- Abner Biberman as Maurice Papinek, a spy
- Otto Waldis as Brodnik, a spy
- Gavin Gordon as Car Salesman
- Steven Geray as Doctor Krüger
- Diana Adams as Princess Maya
- Patricia Denise as Jerry's Mother
- Virginia Huston as Audrey Greene
- Paul England as Chief Inspector Wilton
- Johnstone White as Langstons Secretary
- Henry Brandon as Man with a Trenchcoat
- Lewis Martin as Inspector Crawford

== Home media ==
Knock on Wood was issued as a region 2 DVD in March 2009. A remastered version was released on DVD on September 28, 2010.

== Reception ==
Clyde Gilmour of Maclean's wrote, "Danny Kaye returns to his top form as a bewildered ventriloquist who tangles hilariously with spies, Scotland Yard, Irish tenors, a Russian ballet troupe and a shapely psychiatrist in various European capitals. Highly recommended."

== Banned ripoff ==
Begunah (transl. "innocent") is a 1957 Indian romance film produced by Anupchand Shah and Mahipatray Shah. The film directed by Narendra Suri in hindi language under the Rup Kamal Chitra company. The film was released on 8 March 1957.

The film was banned 10 days after its release because it was a plagiarized version of Knock on Wood. The producers of Knock on the Wood filed a copyright lawsuit in India. They won the case and the judge ordered all prints of Begunah to be destroyed.

== Bibliography ==
- Gehring, Wes D. (October 27, 2016). Movie Comedians of the 1950s: Defining a New Era of Big Screen Comedy. McFarland & Company. ISBN 9781476626925.
