= Borivali Assembly constituency =

Constituency of the Maharashtra legislative assembly in India

Borivali
- Constituency No. 152 for the Maharashtra Legislative Assembly

Constituency details
- Country: India
- Region: Western India
- State: Maharashtra
- District: Mumbai Suburban
- Lok Sabha constituency: Mumbai North
- Established: 1951
- Total electors: 325,749
- Reservation: None

Member of Legislative Assembly
- 15th Maharashtra Legislative Assembly
- Incumbent Sanjay Upadhyay
- Party: Bharatiya Janata Party
- Elected year: 2024

Borivali Assembly constituency is one of the 288 Vidhan Sabha (legislative assembly) constituencies in Maharashtra state in western India. This constituency came into existence in 1951 as one of the 268 Vidhan Sabha constituencies of the erstwhile Bombay state.

== Overview ==
Borivali constituency is one of the 26 Vidhan Sabha constituencies located in the Mumbai Suburban district.

Borivali is part of the Mumbai North Lok Sabha constituency along with five other Vidhan Sabha segments, namely Dahisar, Magathane Kandivali East, Charkop and Malad West in the Mumbai Suburban district.

== Members of the Legislative Assembly ==
Election	Member	Party
1952	Deshpande Madhav Krishna	Indian National Congress
1957	Ishwarlal Pranjiwandas Parekh	Indian National Congress
1962	Ishwarlal Pranjiwandas Parekh	Indian National Congress
1967	J. G. Dattani	Indian National Congress
1972	Dwarkanath Govind Palkar	Indian National Congress
1978	Ram Naik	Janata Party
1980	Ram Naik	Bharatiya Janata Party
1985	Ram Naik	Bharatiya Janata Party
1990	Hemendra Mehta	Bharatiya Janata Party
1995	Hemendra Mehta	Bharatiya Janata Party
1999	Hemendra Mehta	Bharatiya Janata Party
2004	Gopal Shetty	Bharatiya Janata Party
2009	Gopal Shetty	Bharatiya Janata Party
2014	Vinod Tawde	Bharatiya Janata Party
2019	Sunil Dattatraya Rane	Bharatiya Janata Party
2024	Sanjay Upadhyay	Bharatiya Janata Party

== Election results ==
=== Assembly Election 2024 ===
2024 Maharashtra Legislative Assembly election : Borivali
Party	Candidate	Votes	%	±%
BJP	Sanjay Upadhyay	139,947	69.82	▼9.55
SS(UBT)	Sanjay Waman Bhosale	39,690	19.80	New
MNS	Kunal Vijay Mainkar	17,829	8.89	New
NOTA	None of the above	3,637	1.81	▼4.67
BSP	Kisan Sukhdevrao Ingole	1,677	0.84	▼0.59
Margin of victory		100,257	50.02	▼10.94
Turnout		204,079	62.65	▲7.59
Total valid votes		200,442		
Registered electors		325,749		▲8.06
BJP hold		Swing	▼9.55	

=== Assembly Election 2019 ===
2019 Maharashtra Legislative Assembly election : Borivali
Party	Candidate	Votes	%	±%
BJP	Sunil Dattatraya Rane	123,712	79.37	▲18.17
INC	Kumar Khilare	28,691	18.41	▲9.94
NOTA	None of the above	10,095	6.48	▲5.32
BSP	Rajesh Ramkisan Mallah	2,232	1.43	▲0.88
Margin of victory		95,021	60.96	▲16.16
Turnout		165,979	55.06	▲0.49
Total valid votes		155,869		
Registered electors		301,446		▼8.08
BJP hold		Swing	▲18.17	

=== Assembly Election 2014 ===
2014 Maharashtra Legislative Assembly election : Borivali
Party	Candidate	Votes	%	±%
BJP	Vinod Tawde	108,278	61.20	▲13.77
SS	Agarwal Uttamprakash Ca	29,011	16.40	New
MNS	Nayan Pradip Kadam	21,765	12.30	▼14.33
INC	Ashok Ramdas Sutrale	14,993	8.47	▼15.70
NOTA	None of the above	2,056	1.16	New
NCP	Adv. Inderpal Singh	1,190	0.67	New
Margin of victory		79,267	44.80	▲24.00
Turnout		178,977	54.57	▲6.26
Total valid votes		176,920		
Registered electors		327,955		▲9.01
BJP hold		Swing	▲13.77	

=== Assembly Election 2009 ===
2009 Maharashtra Legislative Assembly election : Borivali
Party	Candidate	Votes	%	±%
BJP	Gopal Shetty	68,926	47.43	▼5.20
MNS	Nayan Pradip Kadam	38,699	26.63	New
INC	Bhushan Patil	35,119	24.17	▼10.45
Margin of victory		30,227	20.80	▲2.79
Turnout		145,333	48.31	▼0.10
Total valid votes		145,327		
Registered electors		300,840		▼49.82
BJP hold		Swing	▼5.20	

=== Assembly Election 2004 ===
2004 Maharashtra Legislative Assembly election : Borivali
Party	Candidate	Votes	%	±%
BJP	Gopal Shetty	152,748	52.63	▼10.27
INC	Shashee Prabhu	100,475	34.62	▲0.24
Independent	Hemendra Mehta	28,506	9.82	New
BSP	Nanakbhai Rajbhar	2,003	0.69	New
Margin of victory		52,273	18.01	▼10.51
Turnout		290,257	48.41	▲6.68
Total valid votes		290,250		
Registered electors		599,541		▲21.16
BJP hold		Swing	▼10.27	

=== Assembly Election 1999 ===
1999 Maharashtra Legislative Assembly election : Borivali
Party	Candidate	Votes	%	±%
BJP	Hemendra Mehta	127,784	62.90	▼1.57
INC	Ashok Ramdas Sutrale	69,851	34.38	▲7.27
Independent	D. M. Gaikwad	3,819	1.88	New
Margin of victory		57,933	28.52	▼8.84
Turnout		206,487	41.73	▼11.36
Total valid votes		203,145		
Registered electors		494,845		▲1.86
BJP hold		Swing	▼1.57	

=== Assembly Election 1995 ===
1995 Maharashtra Legislative Assembly election : Borivali
Party	Candidate	Votes	%	±%
BJP	Hemendra Mehta	163,639	64.47	▲7.53
INC	Chintaman Mali	68,810	27.11	▲4.49
JD	J. D. Shah	6,470	2.55	▼13.59
SP	Anand Shetty	3,536	1.39	New
Independent	Jayendra H. Parsawala	2,289	0.90	New
Independent	Mnjulabay Ramesh Patel	1,629	0.64	New
Margin of victory		94,829	37.36	▲3.05
Turnout		257,908	53.09	▲4.00
Total valid votes		253,832		
Registered electors		485,826		▲40.12
BJP hold		Swing	▲7.53	

=== Assembly Election 1990 ===
1990 Maharashtra Legislative Assembly election : Borivali
Party	Candidate	Votes	%	±%
BJP	Hemendra Mehta	96,038	56.94	▲5.39
INC	Sutrale Vijay Ramdas	38,160	22.62	▼9.57
JD	Rashmi Mhatre	27,216	16.14	New
Independent	Mohan Bhoir	4,904	2.91	New
Margin of victory		57,878	34.31	▲14.95
Turnout		170,212	49.09	▲0.63
Total valid votes		168,672		
Registered electors		346,721		▲42.72
BJP hold		Swing	▲5.39	

=== Assembly Election 1985 ===
1985 Maharashtra Legislative Assembly election : Borivali
Party	Candidate	Votes	%	±%
BJP	Ram Naik	59,981	51.55	▼2.36
INC	Navnit Gandhi	37,454	32.19	New
Independent	Gajanan Santuram Thakare	17,011	14.62	New
LKD	Bilgu Yadav	944	0.81	New
Margin of victory		22,527	19.36	▼0.47
Turnout		117,717	48.46	▲10.96
Total valid votes		116,350		
Registered electors		242,930		▲41.03
BJP hold		Swing	▼2.36	

=== Assembly Election 1980 ===
1980 Maharashtra Legislative Assembly election : Borivali
Party	Candidate	Votes	%	±%
BJP	Ram Naik	34,513	53.91	New
INC(I)	Aaba Alias Ramakant Patil	21,819	34.08	▲16.93
JP	B. N. Shroff	7,071	11.05	New
Margin of victory		12,694	19.83	▼30.27
Turnout		64,601	37.50	▼27.14
Total valid votes		64,014		
Registered electors		172,255		▲21.86
BJP gain from JP		Swing	▼13.35	

=== Assembly Election 1978 ===
1978 Maharashtra Legislative Assembly election : Borivali
Party	Candidate	Votes	%	±%
JP	Ram Naik	60,510	67.26	New
INC(I)	Patil Ramakant Parshuram	15,433	17.15	New
SS	Daruvale Vijay Mahadev	7,514	8.35	▼1.73
INC	Rajbhai Khot	5,504	6.12	▼45.80
Independent	Agrawal Natvarlal	843	0.94	New
Margin of victory		45,077	50.10	▲22.35
Turnout		91,371	64.64	▲5.50
Total valid votes		89,967		
Registered electors		141,358		▲2.43
JP gain from INC		Swing	▲15.34	

=== Assembly Election 1972 ===
1972 Maharashtra Legislative Assembly election : Borivali
Party	Candidate	Votes	%	±%
INC	Dwarkanath Govind Palkar	41,389	51.92	▲10.82
ABJS	Thakarshi Mulji Tanna	19,270	24.17	▲8.97
INC(O)	Bhanubhai J. Kapadia	9,999	12.54	New
SS	Gopal Dattaram Pendnekar	8,037	10.08	New
RPI	Chindu Kisan Sonawane	1,021	1.28	New
Margin of victory		22,119	27.75	▲4.10
Turnout		81,611	59.14	▼5.14
Total valid votes		79,716		
Registered electors		138,007		▲43.99
INC hold		Swing	▲10.82	

=== Assembly Election 1967 ===
1967 Maharashtra Legislative Assembly election : Borivali
Party	Candidate	Votes	%	±%
INC	J. G. Dattani	24,148	41.10	▼18.43
SSP	D. G. Palkar	10,254	17.45	New
SWA	M. C. Dave	9,092	15.47	New
ABJS	N. R. Karode	8,929	15.20	New
PSP	T. M. Jha	4,164	7.09	▼9.38
Independent	K. M. Parekh	1,499	2.55	New
Margin of victory		13,894	23.65	▼18.21
Turnout		61,607	64.28	▲2.04
Total valid votes		58,760		
Registered electors		95,843		▼38.52
INC hold		Swing	▼18.43	

=== Assembly Election 1962 ===
1962 Maharashtra Legislative Assembly election : Borivali
Party	Candidate	Votes	%	±%
INC	Ishwarlal Pranjiwandas Parekh	55,940	59.53	▲0.90
Socialist	Padmakar Balkrishna Samant	16,601	17.67	New
PSP	Muljibhai Gopalji Paurana	15,480	16.47	▼20.72
PWPI	Pandurang Nana Gavand	5,094	5.42	New
Independent	Jeshtaram Jaishankar Jani	861	0.92	New
Margin of victory		39,339	41.86	▲20.42
Turnout		97,030	62.24	▲11.13
Total valid votes		93,976		
Registered electors		155,890		▲74.10
INC hold		Swing	▲0.90	

=== Assembly Election 1957 ===
1957 Bombay State Legislative Assembly election : Borivali
Party	Candidate	Votes	%	±%
INC	Ishwarlal Pranjiwandas Parekh	26,831	58.63	▲17.78
PSP	Jha Bhagirath Sadanand	17,021	37.19	New
Independent	Samant Padmakar Balkrishna	1,913	4.18	New
Margin of victory		9,810	21.44	▲16.55
Turnout		45,765	51.11	▲8.85
Total valid votes		45,765		
Registered electors		89,538		▲67.04
INC hold		Swing	▲17.78	

=== Assembly Election 1952 ===
1952 Bombay State Legislative Assembly election : Borivali
Party	Candidate	Votes	%	±%
INC	Deshpande Madhav Krishna	9,253	40.85	New
Socialist	Welingkar Laxmikant Narayan	8,145	35.96	New
Independent	Rajda Pranjiwan Sunderdas	2,503	11.05	New
Independent	Dandekar Dattatray Anant	998	4.41	New
Independent	Churi Madhav Narayan	688	3.04	New
Independent	Sarma Amarnath	656	2.90	New
RRP	Dwivedi Avadh Narayandhar	409	1.81	New
Margin of victory		1,108	4.89	
Turnout		22,652	42.26	
Total valid votes		22,652		
Registered electors		53,603		
INC win (new seat)				

== See also ==
- Borivali
- List of constituencies of Maharashtra Vidhan Sabha
