= Kandivli East Assembly constituency =

Constituency of the Maharashtra legislative assembly in India

Coordinates: 19.203°N 72.875°E

Kandivli East
- Constituency No. 160 for the Maharashtra Legislative Assembly

Constituency details
- Country: India
- Region: Western India
- State: Maharashtra
- District: Mumbai Suburban
- Lok Sabha constituency: Mumbai North
- Established: 2008
- Total electors: 286,932
- Reservation: None

Member of Legislative Assembly
- 15th Maharashtra Legislative Assembly
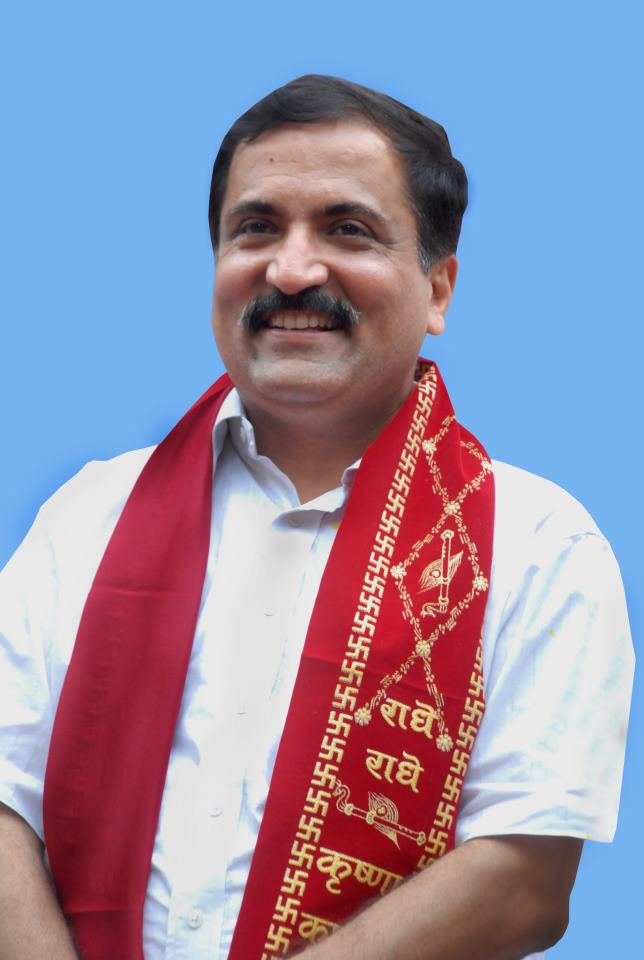
- Incumbent Atul Bhatkhalkar
- Party: BJP
- Elected year: 2024

Kandivli East Assembly constituency is one of the 288 Vidhan Sabha (Legislative Assembly) constituencies in Maharashtra state in western India.

== Overview ==
Kandivli East constituency is one of the 26 Vidhan Sabha constituencies located in the Mumbai Suburban district.

Kandivli East is part of the Mumbai North Lok Sabha constituency along with five other Vidhan Sabha segments, namely Borivali, Magathane, Dahisar, Charkop and Malad West in the Mumbai Suburban district.

== Members of the Legislative Assembly ==
Year	Member	Party
Till 2009 : Constituency did not exist
2009	Thakur Ramesh Singh	Indian National Congress
2014	Atul Bhatkhalkar	Bharatiya Janata Party
2019	Atul Bhatkhalkar	Bharatiya Janata Party
2024	Atul Bhatkhalkar	Bharatiya Janata Party

== Election results ==
=== Assembly Election 2024 ===
2024 Maharashtra Legislative Assembly election : Kandivli East
Party	Candidate	Votes	%	±%
BJP	Atul Bhatkhalkar	114,203	73.40%	▲8.85
INC	Kalu Budhelia	30,610	19.67%	▼5.19
MNS	Mahesh Farkase	7,876	5.06%	▼2.62
NOTA	None of the Above	2,162	1.39%	▼0.72
VBA	Vikas Siddharth Shirsat	1,717	1.10%	▼0.80
Margin of victory		83,593	53.73%	▲14.04
Turnout		157,751	54.98%	▲5.00
Total valid votes		155,589		
Registered electors		286,932		▲6.46
BJP hold		Swing	▲8.85	

=== Assembly Election 2019 ===
2019 Maharashtra Legislative Assembly election : Kandivli East
Party	Candidate	Votes	%	±%
BJP	Atul Bhatkhalkar	85,152	64.55%	▲14.83
INC	Dr. Ajanta Rajpati Yadav	32,798	24.86%	▲3.42
MNS	Hemantkumar Tulshiram Kamble	10,132	7.68%	▼1.39
NOTA	None of the Above	2,780	2.11%	▲1.08
VBA	Rahul Manikrao Jadhav	2,514	1.91%	New
Margin of victory		52,354	39.69%	▲11.41
Turnout		134,707	49.98%	▼3.31
Total valid votes		131,907		
Registered electors		269,510		▼1.39
BJP hold		Swing	▲14.83	

=== Assembly Election 2014 ===
2014 Maharashtra Legislative Assembly election : Kandivli East
Party	Candidate	Votes	%	±%
BJP	Atul Bhatkhalkar	72,427	49.73%	▲16.49
INC	Thakur Ramesh Singh	31,239	21.45%	▼21.47
SS	Amol Gajanan Kirtikar	23,385	16.06%	New
MNS	Adv. Akhilesh Mayashankar Chaubey	13,208	9.07%	▼11.55
NCP	Shrikant R. Mishra	3,189	2.19%	New
NOTA	None of the Above	1,492	1.02%	New
Margin of victory		41,188	28.28%	▲18.60
Turnout		147,171	53.85%	▲7.40
Total valid votes		145,645		
Registered electors		273,300		▲7.37
BJP gain from INC		Swing	▲6.81	

=== Assembly Election 2009 ===
2009 Maharashtra Legislative Assembly election : Kandivli East
Party	Candidate	Votes	%	±%
INC	Thakur Ramesh Singh	50,138	42.92%	New
BJP	Jaiprakash Thakur	38,832	33.24%	New
MNS	Pawar Vinod Tukaram	24,091	20.62%	New
BSP	Bansode Ravi Bhikaji	950	0.81%	New
Margin of victory		11,306	9.68%	
Turnout		116,830	45.90%	
Total valid votes		116,826		
Registered electors		254,551		
INC win (new seat)				

== See also ==
- Kandivli
- List of constituencies of the Maharashtra Legislative Assembly
