= Prakash Surve =

Indian politician

Member of the Maharashtra Legislative Assembly
- Incumbent
- Assumed office 2014
- Preceded by: Pravin Darekar
- Constituency: Magathane

Personal details
- Party: Shiv Sena

Prakash Surve is a Shiv Sena politician from Mumbai, Maharashtra. He is a member of the 13th,14th, 15th Maharashtra Legislative Assembly. He represents Magathane Vidhan Sabha constituency of Mumbai, Maharashtra, India as a member of Shiv Sena.

== Positions held ==
- 2014: Elected to Maharashtra Legislative Assembly
- 2019: Re-elected to Maharashtra Legislative Assembly
- 2024: Re-elected to Maharashtra Legislative Assembly

== See also ==
- Mumbai North Lok Sabha constituency
