= Lajwanti =

1958 film by Narendra Suri

- Film poster
- Directed by: Narendra Suri
- Written by: Sachin Bhowmick; Umesh Mathur; Surendra Shailaja
- Produced by: Mohan Segal
- Starring: Nargis; Balraj Sahni
- Cinematography: M. N. Malhotra
- Edited by: Pratap Dave
- Music by: S. D. Burman
- Distributed by: De Lux Films
- Release date: 1958
- Running time: 120 minutes
- Country: India
- Language: Hindi

Lajwanti is a 1958 Indian drama film directed by Narendra Suri. It was entered into the 1959 Cannes Film Festival, where it competed for the Palme d'Or for Best Film. The film was remade in Tamil as Engal Selvi (1960).

== Cast ==
- Balraj Sahni as Nirmal Kumar
- Nargis as Mrs. Kavita Kumar
- Naaz as Renu
- Radhakrishan as Pyare Mohan
- Manorama as Mrs. Godavari
- Mumtaz Begum as Jamna
- Leela Mishra as Nirmal's Sister

== Soundtrack ==
Song	Singer
"Chanda Re, Chanda Re" (Happy)	Asha Bhosle
"Chanda Re, Chanda Re" (Sad)	Asha Bhosle
"Koi Aaya, Dhadkan Kehti Hai"	Asha Bhosle
"Ek Hans Ka Joda"	Asha Bhosle
"Ga Mere Man Ga"	Asha Bhosle
"Chanda Mama, Mere Dwar Aana, Leke Kirnon Ke Haar Aana"	Asha Bhosle, Manna Dey
"Aaja, Chhaye Kare Badra"	Geeta Dutt

== Awards ==
National Film Awards

- 1959 - National Film Award for Best Feature Film in Hindi - Certificate of Merit
