= Sunil Rane =

Indian politician

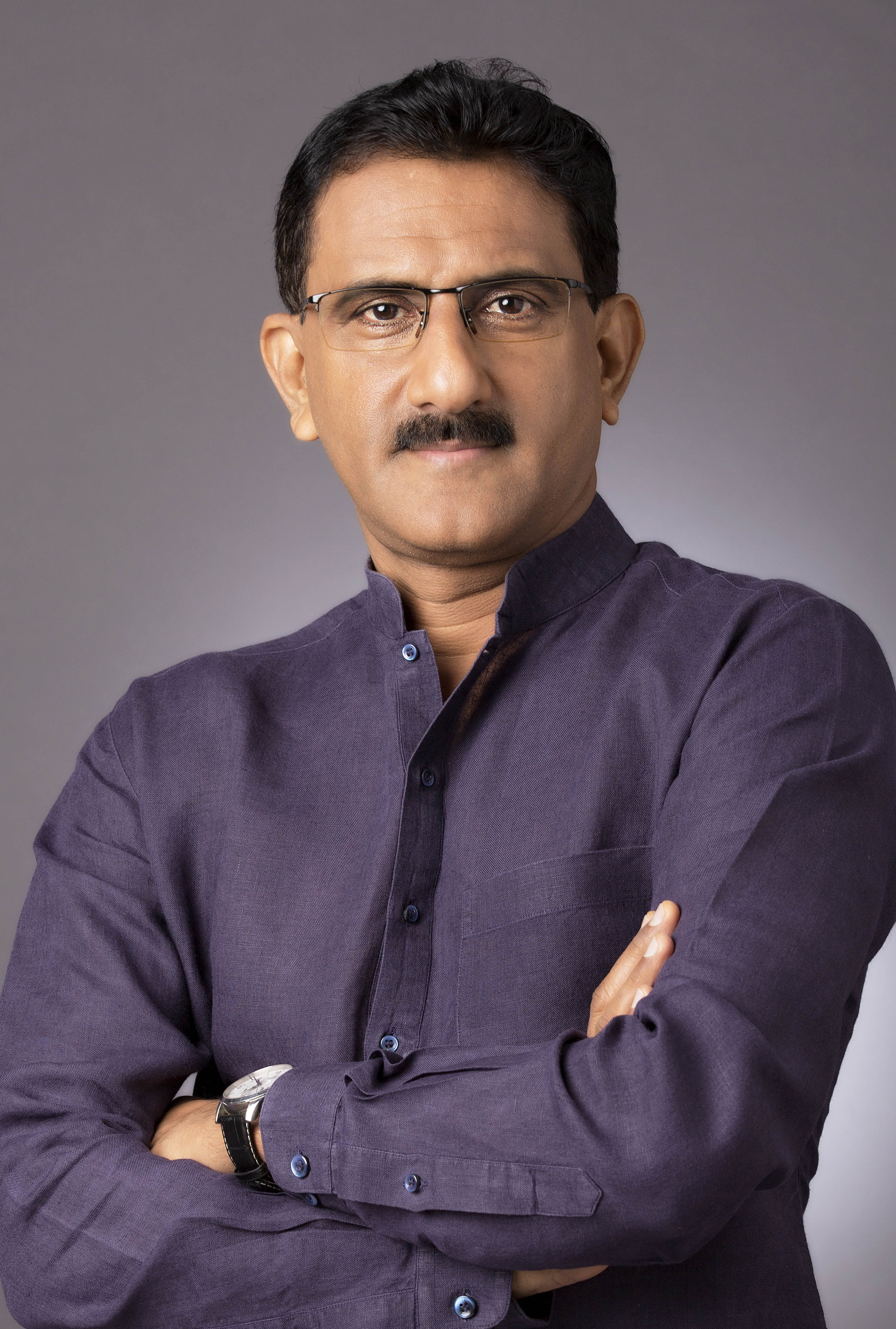

Member, Maharashtra Legislative Assembly
- Incumbent
- Assumed office 24 October 2019 - 22 November 2024
- Preceded by: Vinod Tawde
- Succeeded by: Sanjay Upadhyay
- Constituency: Borivali

Personal details
- Born: 3 September 1963 (age 63) Mumbai, Maharashtra, India
- Party: Bharatiya Janata Party
- Spouse: Varsha Rane
- Education: University of Mumbai
- Website: www.sunilrane.com

Sunil Dattatray Rane (born 3 September 1963) is an Indian politician who is a member of the Maharashtra Legislative Assembly from the Borivali assembly constituency. Rane is the son of former Bharatiya Janata Party leader Datta Rane. In the last election, Rane won the Borivali seat by 95,021 votes. He defeated Kumar Khillare of Congress.

== Early life and education ==
Rane was born (Father: Dattatray Rane, Mother: Late Kalpana Rane) in Worli, Mumbai, Maharashtra on 3 September 1963. His father Datta Rane is a leader of the Bharatiya Janata Party and a former cabinet minister in the Government of Maharashtra. He received his education from Balmohan Vidya Mandir and D.G Ruparel College in Mumbai. He graduated with a degree in Bachelor of Commerce from Mumbai University.

== Political career ==
Rane began his political career in 1998 by joining the Bharatiya Janata Party. In the years 2006-2019, he was the General Secretary for the Mumbai unit of the party, 1997-2000 he was Vice President of Bharatiya Janata Yuva Morcha, Maharashtra State. He has contested elections of MLA in Shewri constituency in 2004 and from Worli constituency in 2014. In 2019 he won the Borivali seat by 95,021 votes by defeating Kumar Khillare of the Indian National Congress.

== Educational Establishment ==
Atharva Group of Institutes was established in the year 1998. It has Atharva College of Engineering, approved by AICTE, DTE & affiliated with Mumbai University, and Atharva Institute of Management Studies which is approved by AICTE, DTE & affiliated with Mumbai University. Rane founded Atharva Foundation in the year 2016 to provide quality education for all and help the not-so-privileged sections of society.

== Women Empowerment and Safety ==
Atharva Foundation works towards the upliftment of the less fortunate women in India. They take care of the education of girls who are not able to complete their graduation or have to drop out because of financial problems.

== Healthcare ==
Rane has been taking various healthcare activities and initiatives in his constituency via various medical programs.

== Sports ==
Sunil Rane's Atharva Foundation provides support to sportsmen at the grassroots level.

== Support to Indian Armed Forces ==
Rane's One For All | All For One campaign has actioned through various initiatives like women empowerment, assistance to the families of martyrs, and education for the girl child. It also provides Education, Health, and financial assistance to martyrs' families.
