= Dahisar Assembly constituency =

Constituency of the Maharashtra legislative assembly in India

Coordinates: 19.252°N 72.859°E

Dahisar
- Constituency No. 153 for the Maharashtra Legislative Assembly

Constituency details
- Country: India
- Region: Western India
- State: Maharashtra
- District: Mumbai Suburban
- Lok Sabha constituency: Mumbai North
- Established: 2008
- Total electors: 277,943
- Reservation: None

Member of Legislative Assembly
- 15th Maharashtra Legislative Assembly
- Incumbent Manisha Chaudhary
- Party: Bharatiya Janata Party
- Elected year: 2024

Dahisar Assembly constituency is one of the 288 Vidhan Sabha (Legislative Assembly) constituencies in Maharashtra state in western India.

== Overview ==
Dahisar constituency is one of the 26 Vidhan Sabha constituencies located in the Mumbai Suburban district.

Dahisar is part of the Mumbai North Lok Sabha constituency along with five other Vidhan Sabha segments, namely Borivali, Magathane, Kandivali East, Charkop and Malad West in the Mumbai Suburban district.

== Members of the Legislative Assembly ==
Year	Member	Party
Till 2009 : Constituency did not exist
2009	Vinod Ghosalkar	Shiv Sena
2014	Manisha Chaudhary	Bharatiya Janata Party
2019	Manisha Chaudhary	Bharatiya Janata Party
2024	Manisha Chaudhary	Bharatiya Janata Party

== Election results ==
=== Assembly Election 2024 ===
2024 Maharashtra Legislative Assembly election : Dahisar
Party	Candidate	Votes	%	±%
BJP	Manisha Ashok Chaudhary	98,587	61.47	▼5.50
SS(UBT)	Vinod Ghosalkar	54,258	33.83	New
MNS	Rajesh Gangaram Yerunkar	5,456	3.40	▼9.63
NOTA	None of the Above	2,191	1.37	▼1.86
Margin of victory		44,329	27.64	▼21.22
Turnout		162,583	58.50	▲6.46
Total valid votes		160,392		
Registered electors		277,943		▲8.87
BJP hold		Swing	▼5.50	

=== Assembly Election 2019 ===
2019 Maharashtra Legislative Assembly election : Dahisar
Party	Candidate	Votes	%	±%
BJP	Manisha Ashok Chaudhary	87,607	66.96	▲18.07
INC	Arun Sawant	23,690	18.11	▲4.25
MNS	Rajesh Gangaram Yerunkar	17,052	13.03	▲1.99
NOTA	None of the Above	4,222	3.23	▲2.02
BSP	Adv. Harshatai Chowkekar	1,015	0.78	▲0.45
Margin of victory		63,917	48.85	▲24.43
Turnout		135,055	52.90	▲1.35
Total valid votes		130,832		
Registered electors		255,297		▼19.36
BJP hold		Swing	▲18.07	

=== Assembly Election 2014 ===
2014 Maharashtra Legislative Assembly election : Dahisar
Party	Candidate	Votes	%	±%
BJP	Manisha Ashok Chaudhary	77,238	48.90	New
SS	Vinod Ghosalkar	38,660	24.47	▼21.20
INC	Sheetal Ashok Mhatre	21,889	13.86	▼19.53
MNS	Dr. Shubha Umesh Raul	17,439	11.04	▼5.87
NOTA	None of the Above	1,907	1.21	New
NCP	Harish Bhujang Sheatty	995	0.63	New
Margin of victory		38,578	24.42	▲12.14
Turnout		159,873	50.50	▲2.21
Total valid votes		157,965		
Registered electors		316,607		▲14.79
BJP gain from SS		Swing	▲3.22	

=== Assembly Election 2009 ===
2009 Maharashtra Legislative Assembly election : Dahisar
Party	Candidate	Votes	%	±%
SS	Vinod Ghosalkar	60,069	45.67	New
INC	Dr. Dube Yogesh Ghanshyam	43,913	33.39	New
MNS	Deepa Ganesh Patil	22,241	16.91	New
JD(S)	Edwin Francis Britto	2,661	2.02	New
Margin of victory		16,156	12.28	
Turnout		131,521	47.69	
Total valid votes		131,520		
Registered electors		275,806		
SS win (new seat)				

== See also ==
- Dahisar
- List of constituencies of Maharashtra Vidhan Sabha
