= Dnyaneshwar Vidyapeeth =

Fraudulent university in Pune, India

Dnyaneshwar Vidyapeeth Pune
- Type: Defunct fake university
- Active: 1980–2005
- Location: Pune, Maharashtra, India

Dnyaneshwar Vidyapeeth Trust (DVT) was an unaccredited fraudulent university that operated from an apartment building in Pune, Maharashtra. It was founded by M. D. Apte in 1980 and registered as "Educational Trust".

It was not a university under UGC act. In a 2005 order, the Bombay High court said that Dnyaneshwar Vidyapeeth did not have any rights to award degrees. The university was subsequently shut down per the directions of the High Court and that the degrees issued were invalid.

Manohar Joshi was chancellor of the organisation in 2003 but later the post of chancellor was abolished.

DVT ran 33 franchises colleges across Maharashtra and Karnataka and offered diploma and degree courses in engineering. Nearly 5,000 students enrolled every year at annual fees from Rs 22,000 to Rs 25,000. It ceased operations after a High Court order following a public interest litigation (PIL).

== Controversy ==
In 2015, then Maharashtra Education Minister Vinod Tawde's name came in the limelight concerning an unrecognised engineering degree obtained from DVT.

Similarly, in 2020, Maharashtra Higher Education Minister Uday Samant's degree from the unrecognised institute called into question.
