= Vandana (film) =

- Directed by: Narendra Suri
- Produced by: N.K.R. Films
- Starring: Parikshit Sahni; Sadhana
- Music by: Ravi
- Release date: 1975
- Country: India
- Language: Hindi

Vandana is a 1975 Indian film directed by Narendra Suri in Hindi language under the banner of N.K.R. Films. The film stars Parikshit Sahni, Sadhana, Sarika, Bindu, Johnny Walker.

== Plot ==
An orphan girl, named Bindu is trapped in a web of deceit and crime that imprisons her in shackles. Expressive as in her other films, events take her through life's journey in a tale that is not quite regular Bombay potboiler. For one, there is a rare use of boats, the 28 metre Pamela (a cabin cruiser) and a couple of dinghies with outboards.

== Cast ==
- Parikshit Sahni as Rakesh
- Sadhana as Rekha
- Bindu as Shobha
- Johnny Walker as John
- Mukri as Popatram
- Nazir Hussain as Jailor
- Narendranath as Badal
- Badri Prasad as Judge 1
- Murad as Judge 2
- Jankidas Mehra as Moneylender
- Narmada Shankar as Pandit
- Sarika as Asha
- Durga Khote as Rakesh's Mother
- Krishnakant as Shobha's Uncle
- Praveen Paul as Lady Jailor
- Manmohan as Vasant Kumar
- Jayshree T. as Sonia

== Soundtrack ==
The music was composed by Ravi with lyrics by Anjaan. The soundtrack was released by Saregama.

Vandana

Soundtrack album by Ravi
- Released: 25 December 1974
- Recorded: 1974
- Genre: Soundtrack
- Length: 22:09
- Label: Saregama
- Producer: Ravi

Song	Singer
"Aapki Inayaten Aapke Karam"	Lata Mangeshkar
"Manmohana Manmohana"-1	Lata Mangeshkar
"Manmohana Manmohana"-2	Lata Mangeshkar
"Rut Hai Jawan Sama Hai"	Lata Mangeshkar
"Main Tumse Pyar Karta Hoon"	Mohammed Rafi
"Ae Sochta Hai Kya Aaja"	Asha Bhosle
