= Gopal Shetty =

Indian politician

Member of Parliament, Lok Sabha
- In office 2014–2024
- Preceded by: Sanjay Nirupam
- Succeeded by: Piyush Goyal
- Constituency: Mumbai North

Member of Maharashtra Legislative Assembly
- In office 2004–2014
- Preceded by: Hemendra Mehta
- Succeeded by: Vinod Tawde
- Constituency: Borivali

President of Bharatiya Janata Party – Mumbai
- In office 22 April 2008 – 1 September 2010
- President: Nitin Gadkari; Sudhir Mungantiwar
- Preceded by: Prakash Mehta
- Succeeded by: Raj K. Purohit

Personal details
- Born: 31 January 1954 (age 72) Bombay, Bombay State, India
- Party: Bharatiya Janata Party
- Spouse: Usha (m. 1981)
- Children: 1 son, 1 daughter
- Website: gopalshetty.com

Gopal Chinayya Shetty is a Mumbai based Mangalore origin Indian politician. He is a former member of parliament from Mumbai North. Previously, he was a 2 terms Member of Legislative Assembly (MLA) from the Borivali Vidhan Sabha constituency and 3 terms Corporator of Brihanmumbai Mahanagar Corporation (BMC) from 1992-2004. He is currently the Member of Parliament for Mumbai-North constituency.

He was the president of the Mumbai unit of Bharatiya Janata Party.

He has also served the Bharatiya Janata Party in various capacities from Mandal secretary to the president of Mumbai BJP.

In 2016, Shetty surrendered public land, including the Poinsur Gymkhana, Kamla Vihar Sports Complex, and Veer Savarkar Udyan plots, which had been directly or indirectly placed under his control.

Gopal Shetty, the BJP candidate won the 2019 Indian general elections in the North Mumbai constituency, defeating Congress party (INC) candidate Urmila Matondkar by a margin of 465,247 votes. This victory set a record for the highest number of votes received by any candidate in Maharashtra during the 2019 elections.

He has taken active participation in all the initiatives of PM Narendra Modi. Mumbai Local trains are lifeline of Mumbai and Borivali is a major junction which is starting point for Western Railway locals and stopping point for all the major long distance trains. Gopal Shetty was active in implementing various facilities for travelers like escalators, elevators and Foot over Bridges (FOB's) at Borivali Railway Station.

== Borivali "The Suburb of Gardens" ==
Borivali can be called as the garden suburb as it had one of the National Park with Kanheri Caves. Now in last 10–15 years it has been a suburb with a bouquets of garden due to the efforts of Shri Gopal Shetty the MLC, MLA and then MP of this area.

He rose from a grass-roots worker to BMC corporator, MLA and then MP, due to which he was able to work with various government departments, NGO’s and other organizations to make Borivali a The Suburb of Gardens, with a garden every half a kilometer with different themes.

There are various plantations theme in each garden, Gopinath Munde garden Largest collection of Palm trees is an example of Vertical garden in this collection of gardens/parks.

== Blood Donation Drives ==
Gopal Shetty has consistently encouraged people to donate blood at least once in a year and if more its better. He ensures that events of his constituency are designed as blood donation drives and his efforts over the years have resulted in the donation of more than 100,000 blood bottle units.

== Controversies ==
His remarks about farmer suicide created ruckus in media, later he clarified he was misquoted.

“Not all farmers’ suicides happen due to unemployment and starvation. A fashion is going on. A trend is on.”

He was slammed by activists and opposition for his 'sexist' private member's bill in Lok Sabha.

He stoked a controversy by saying Christians did not participate in freedom movement and alleged corruption in utilization of open spaces.
