= Vinod Tawde =

Indian politician (born 1963)

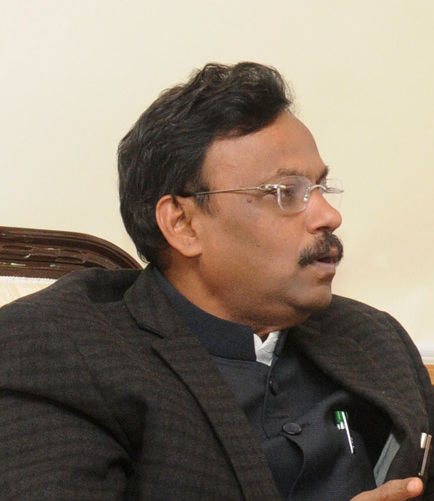
- Tawde in 2015

Member of Parliament, Rajya Sabha
- Incumbent
- Assumed office 3 April 2026
- Preceded by: Dhairyashil Patil
- Constituency: Maharashtra

National General Secretary of Bharatiya Janata Party
- Incumbent
- Assumed office 21 November 2021
- President: Jagat Prakash Nadda; Nitin Nabin

National Secretary of Bharatiya Janata Party
- In office 26 September 2020 – 21 November 2021
- President: Jagat Prakash Nadda

Minister of Legislative Affairs of Maharashtra
- In office 7 June 2019 – 8 November 2019
- Chief Minister: Devendra Fadnavis
- Preceded by: Girish Bapat
- Succeeded by: Anil Parab

Minister of Higher & Technical Education of Maharashtra
- In office 31 October 2014 – 8 November 2019
- Chief Minister: Devendra Fadnavis
- Preceded by: Rajesh Tope
- Succeeded by: Uday Samant

Minister of Cultural Affairs of Maharashtra
- In office 31 October 2014 – 8 November 2019
- Chief Minister: Devendra Fadnavis
- Preceded by: Sanjay Deotale
- Succeeded by: Amit Deshmukh

Minister of School Education & Sports & Youth Welfare of Maharashtra
- In office 31 October 2014 – 16 June 2019
- Chief Minister: Devendra Fadnavis
- Preceded by: Rajendra Darda
- Succeeded by: Ashish Shelar

Minister of Medical Education of Maharashtra
- In office 31 October 2014 – 8 July 2016
- Chief Minister: Devendra Fadnavis
- Preceded by: Jitendra Awhad
- Succeeded by: Girish Mahajan

Member of Maharashtra Legislative Assembly
- In office 2014–2019
- Preceded by: Gopal Shetty
- Succeeded by: Sunil Rane
- Constituency: Borivali

Leader of the Opposition in Maharashtra Legislative Council
- In office 23 December 2011 – 20 October 2014
- Chief Minister: Prithviraj Chavan
- Preceded by: Pandurang Fundkar
- Succeeded by: Dhananjay Munde

Member of Maharashtra Legislative Council
- In office 25 April 2002 – 20 October 2014
- Succeeded by: Smita Wagh
- Constituency: Elected by the MLAs

President of Bharatiya Janata Party, Mumbai
- In office 2000–2003
- Preceded by: Kirit Somaiya
- Succeeded by: Vijay Girkar

Personal details
- Born: 20 July 1963 (age 63) Mumbai, Maharashtra, India
- Party: Bharatiya Janata Party
- Spouse: Varsha Pawar Tawde
- Children: Anvee Tawde (daughter)
- Education: AMIE (Note: not a degree recognised by AICTE)
- Profession: Politician
- Website: www.vinodtawde.com

Vinod Tawde (Marathi pronunciation: [ʋinoːd̪ t̪aːʋɖeː]; born 20 July 1963) is an Indian politician from Maharashtra and a senior leader of the Bharatiya Janata Party (BJP). He is currently serving as the Member of Parliament from Maharashtra since 2026. He was the General Secretary for Maharashtra unit of the party, President for Mumbai, All India National Executive Council Member and a key member of co-ordination Committee of the BJP for the 12th and 13th Lok Sabha Election.

Vinod Tawde was the minister for School Education, Higher and technical education, Sports and Youth welfare, Minority development as well as Marathi Bhasha (Language) and culture; this is his third consecutive term as the Member of the Legislative Council of Maharashtra. Earlier, he was the Leader of Opposition in the Maharashtra Legislative Council.p

== Early life and education ==
Vinod Tawde was born on 20 July 1963 in a Maratha family in the Girangaon area of Bombay (present-day Mumbai).

Vinod Tawde is a Higher Secondary School Certificate holder from Sathaye College (previously known as 'Parle College'). After passing the Higher Secondary School Certificate examination, Tawde pursued a vocational course from Dnyaneshwar Vidyapeeth, Pune which is an Educational Trust that provides technical training courses.

== Political career ==
Vinod Tawade is a member of the Rashtriya Swayamsevak Sangh (RSS) since childhood. He was a full time worker of Akhil Bharatiya Vidyarhi Parishad(ABVP). As a head of the Mumbai unit of the ABVP, Tawade demonstrated leadership in both the ABVP and among students in Mumbai.

In 1995, Vinod Tawde was first named as the Maharashtra General Secretary of the BJP and he served up to 1999. Once again in 2002, he was assigned the responsibility; he served the term up to 2011. In 1999, Vinod Tawde was elected as the President of the Mumbai Metropolitan Unit of the BJP. He enjoys the record of being the youngest candidate elected for this position. Vinod Tawde is on the board of directors of Rambhau Mhalgi Prabodhini, a non-profit organisation that provides leadership training to socio-political activists.

In Maharashtra assembly election - 2014 Vinod Tawde elected as Member of Legislative assembly of Maharashtra from Borivali assembly constituency. He was sworn in as a minister of school education and sports, higher and technical education, medical education, Marathi Bhasha and cultural affairs at an extravagant ceremony at the Wankhede Stadium in Mumbai on 31 October 2014.

Tawde was elected unopposed to the Rajya Sabha from Maharashtra in 2026.

== Initiatives taken ==
=== 2011 ===
Vinod Tawde consistently supported mill workers who raised their housing concerns; he assured them a fair and just resolution. Vinod Tawde resolved the issue of overdue insurance premium of 45,000 in the police department.

=== 2012 ===
Vinod Tawde demanded an early completion of memorial of Chhatrapati Shivaji Maharaj in the Arabian Sea which was long pending and was first proposed in 1980. He demanded a tweak in law to bring Shivaji Park out of the silence zone stating that the park has a rich political history and prohibiting public rallies out there was not a good precedent. Between 1999 and 2003, there took a preferential allotment of over 20 hectares of MHADA land spread over 67 plots in Mumbai at throwaway prices to politicians or their trusts by a state sub-committee comprising a handful of Congress and NCP ministers. In 2012, Vinod Tawde asked the chief minister, Prithviraj Chavan to take back those plots where there was nothing built until then. In the interest of creating employment and self-employment opportunities for SC youth, he urged that MIDC should allot plots to organisations like DICCI on priority basis. Vinod Tawde ensured that the Koli brethren was given priority at the time when the municipal markets was being redeveloped. In their difficult times, Vinod tawde stood by the Konkan mango farmers. He urged that they should be compensated for crop loss; however the government did consider his proposal. Vinod Tawde exposed the fact that investigation in the case of murder of journalist J Dey was on a wrong track and Jigna Vora has been purposefully implicated in the case.

=== 2013 ===
Vinod Tawde was the first leader to demand a separate budget for agriculture and he consistently proposed measures that the government should implement to enhance agriculture productivity and prevent farmer-suicides. In connection to the Adarsh housing society scam, Vinod Tawde demanded a special session of the state Legislature to table the action taken report (ATR); however the government took no action. He also demanded a SIT probe into wakf land allotments. With the help of a documentary evidence, Vinod Tawde exposed the fact that even after spending Rs. 70,000 crore, irrigated area in the state increased by only 1%. He used various legislative devices to compel the government to establish an enquiry committee under chairmanship of Madhavrao Chitale for investigation of corruption in irrigation sector. He presented a 15,000-pager documentary evidence before the Chitale Committee; the report of the committee held not only officers but also ministers guilty of corruption. Vinod Tawde condemned government's decision to start a textile park in Baramati; in his opinion the government should have selected a cotton producing district to set up the facility. He further pointed out that the textile policy announced by the government was non beneficial for farmers.

== Academic qualification controversy ==
Vinod Tawde obtained a AMIE from Dnyaneshwar Vidyapeeth, Pune. This a technical course. However, Dnyaneshwar Vidyapeeth is not associated with the All India Council for Technical Education (AICTE) or the Directorate of Technical Education, Maharashtra. The Bombay High court had in a 2005 order, said that Dnyaneshwar Vidyapeeth does not have any rights to award degrees, and that the degrees issued even before 2005 were invalid.

Leader of Opposition in the Maharashtra Legislative Assembly, Radhakrishna Vikhe Patil, has demanded Tawde's resignation over his bogus degree. In defence of Tawde, Devendra Fadnavis, Chief Minister of Maharashtra said that Tawde never suppressed the fact and there was no need for him to resign. During 2024 Maharashtra Legislative Assembly election, BVA workers accused Vinod Tawde of distributing money in a hotel, a day before polling, in spite of MCC in force so that no outsider must be in a constituency after campaigning ends.However money, as claimed 5 crores, was not found.

== Notes ==
Political offices
Preceded by	Cabinet Minister for Education, Maharashtra State; December 2014–present	Incumbent
Preceded by	Cabinet Minister for Culture, Maharashtra State; December 2014–present	Incumbent
Preceded by	Maharashtra State Guardian Minister for Mumbai Suburban district December 2014–present	Incumbent
