= Pravin Darekar =

Indian politician from Maharashtra

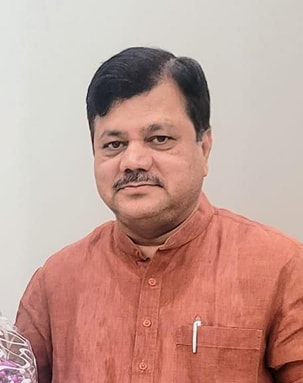

Leader of the Opposition Maharashtra Legislative Council
- In office 16 December 2019 – 29 June 2022
- Chief Minister: Uddhav Thackeray
- Preceded by: Dhananjay Munde
- Succeeded by: Ambadas Danve

Member of Maharashtra Legislative Assembly
- In office 2009–2014
- Preceded by: Constituency established
- Succeeded by: Prakash Surve
- Constituency: Magathane

Member of Maharashtra Legislative Council
- Incumbent
- Assumed office 8 July 2016
- Constituency: Elected by MLAs

Personal details
- Party: Bharatiya Janata Party (2016-)
- Other political affiliations: Maharashtra Navnirman Sena (Until 2016)
- Occupation: Politician
- Website: mahabjp.org

Pravin Darekar is an Indian politician from Maharashtra. He was a one term Member of the Maharashtra Legislative Assembly from the Magathane (Vidhan Sabha constituency) and former leader of Opposition in Maharashtra legislative council.

== Maharashtra Legislative Assembly elections 2014 ==
Pravin Darekar lost the Maharashtra Legislative Assembly elections 2014.

== Early political life ==
Praveen Darekar was first elected to the Maharashtra Legislative Assembly on a Maharashtra Navnirman Sena ticket in 2009.

== Maharashtra Navnirman Sena ==
Pravin Darekar was one of the driving forces along with Raj Thackeray to form the Maharashtra Navnirman Sena.

== Joined Bharatiya Janata Party ==
After his loss in the 2014 Maharashtra Legislative Assembly election he left the Maharashtra Navnirman Sena to join the Bharatiya Janata Party.

== Positions held ==
- Maharashtra Legislative Assembly MLA
- Terms in office: 2009–2014.
- Member(elect) of Maharashtra Legislative Council
- Terms in office:2016.
- Leader of Opposition Maharashtra Legislative Council Incumbent

== Controversy ==
He was booked in the rupees 123 crore Mumbai District Cooperative Bank scam.
