= Magathane Assembly constituency =

Constituency of the Maharashtra legislative assembly in India

Coordinates: 19°13′13.49″N 72°52′0.21″E

Magathane
- Constituency No. 154 for the Maharashtra Legislative Assembly

Constituency details
- Country: India
- Region: Western India
- State: Maharashtra
- District: Mumbai Suburban
- Lok Sabha constituency: Mumbai North
- Established: 2008
- Total electors: 304,676
- Reservation: None

Member of Legislative Assembly
- 15th Maharashtra Legislative Assembly
- Incumbent Prakash Surve
- Party: SHS
- Alliance: NDA
- Elected year: 2024

Magathane Assembly constituency is one of the 288 Vidhan Sabha (Legislative Assembly) constituencies of Maharashtra state in western India.

== Overview ==
Magathane constituency is one of the 26 Vidhan Sabha constituencies located in the Mumbai Suburban district.

Magathane is part of the Mumbai North Lok Sabha constituency along with five other Vidhan Sabha segments, namely Dahisar, Borivali, Kandivali East, Charkop, and Malad West in the Mumbai Suburban district.

== Members of the Legislative Assembly ==
Year	Member	Party
Till 2009 : Constituency did not exist
2009	Pravin Darekar	Maharashtra Navnirman Sena
2014	Prakash Surve	Shiv Sena
2019	Prakash Surve	Shiv Sena
2024	Prakash Surve	Shiv Sena

== Election results ==
=== Assembly Election 2024 ===
2024 Maharashtra Legislative Assembly election : Magathane
Party	Candidate	Votes	%	±%
SS	Prakash Rajaram Surve	105,527	59.07%	▼2.49
SS(UBT)	Udesh Patekar	47,363	26.51%	New
MNS	Nayan Pradeep Kadam	21,297	11.92%	▼16.10
NOTA	None of the Above	2,818	1.58%	▼1.73
VBA	Deepak Shivaji Hanwate	2,257	1.26%	New
Margin of victory		58,164	32.56%	▼0.98
Turnout		181,465	59.56%	▲5.18
Total valid votes		178,647		
Registered electors		304,676		▲11.15
SS hold		Swing	▼2.49	

=== Assembly Election 2019 ===
2019 Maharashtra Legislative Assembly election : Magathane
Party	Candidate	Votes	%	±%
SS	Prakash Rajaram Surve	90,206	61.56%	▲21.01
MNS	Nayan Pradeep Kadam	41,060	28.02%	▲8.03
NCP	Manishankar Gaurishankar Singh Chauhan	7,339	5.01%	▲3.33
NOTA	None of the Above	4,849	3.31%	▲2.15
Independent	Sadanand Prabhakar Mane	3,354	2.29%	New
Independent	Devendra Muratsingh Thakur	1,534	1.05%	New
BSP	Rajaram Bhiwrao Jadhav	1,246	0.85%	▲0.10
Margin of victory		49,146	33.54%	▲20.83
Turnout		151,492	55.27%	▲1.36
Total valid votes		146,523		
Registered electors		274,102		▼10.93
SS hold		Swing	▲21.01	

=== Assembly Election 2014 ===
2014 Maharashtra Legislative Assembly election : Magathane
Party	Candidate	Votes	%	±%
SS	Prakash Rajaram Surve	65,016	40.55%	▲15.94
BJP	Hemendra Ratilal Mehta	44,631	27.84%	New
MNS	Pravin Darekar	32,057	19.99%	▼20.00
INC	Sawant Sachin Madhavrao	12,202	7.61%	New
NCP	Sachin Shinde	2,697	1.68%	▼29.41
NOTA	None of the Above	1,862	1.16%	New
BSP	Sachit Manohar Kamble	1,205	0.75%	▼0.45
Margin of victory		20,385	12.71%	▲3.81
Turnout		162,210	52.71%	▼2.01
Total valid votes		160,330		
Registered electors		307,735		▲14.23
SS gain from MNS		Swing	▲0.55	

=== Assembly Election 2009 ===
2009 Maharashtra Legislative Assembly election : Magathane
Party	Candidate	Votes	%	±%
MNS	Pravin Darekar	58,310	40.00%	New
NCP	Prakash Rajaram Surve	45,325	31.09%	New
SS	Ashok G. Nar	35,883	24.61%	New
BSP	Divakar Gondane	1,755	1.20%	New
Independent	Rajesh Jiledar Singh	1,562	1.07%	New
Independent	Mohammed Sabir Siddhik Malik.	1,407	0.97%	New
Margin of victory		12,985	8.91%	
Turnout		145,790	54.12%	
Total valid votes		145,783		
Registered electors		269,399		
MNS win (new seat)				

== See also ==
- Magathane
- List of constituencies of Maharashtra Vidhan Sabha
