= Satish Jain =

Indian politician

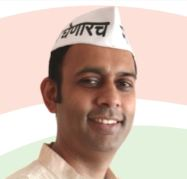
- Born: 18 August 1968 (age 57)
- Education: Bachelor of Engineering from College of Engineering, Pune MBA from IIM Bangalore
- Occupation: Banker
- Known for: Exposing Maharashtra electricity scam Maharashtra, India
- Spouse: Meenal Jain
- Children: 2
- Website: satishjain.in

Satish Kumar Jain (18 August 1968) is a former candidate from BJP]] (AAP) who was contesting from the North Mumbai (Mumbai North) constituency in the 2014 Lok Sabha Elections, which he lost getting 32,364 votes. Prior to trying himself in politics he worked as a portfolio manager for HDFC Mutual Fund and as an Executive Director for Morgan Stanley. Satish Jain gained media attention after exposing the Rs 22,000 crore (INR 22 billion) electricity scam in Maharashtra.

== Early life ==
Satish Jain is married to Meenal Jain. The couple have two children.

== Education and professional life ==
=== Bachelors ===
Satish Jain completed his bachelor's degree in Engineering from College of Engineering, Pune.

=== Masters ===
Satish Jain has an MBA from IIM Bangalore.

=== Finance Industry ===
Jain worked in the finance industry for 18 years prior to involvement in politics. He worked with HDFC Mutual Fund as a portfolio manager and with Morgan Stanley as an Executive Director.

== Entry into Politics ==
On 13 March 2014 Satish Jain was nominated as a candidate for Aam Aadmi Party in the North Mumbai constituency. Other candidates of AAP are Mayank Gandhi (North-West Mumbai), Meera Sanyal (South Mumbai), Medha Patkar (North-East Mumbai).

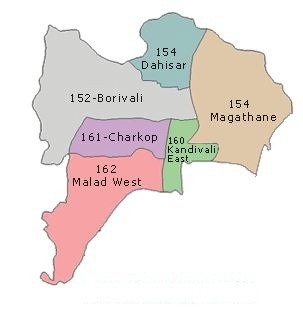
Mumbai North Lok Sabha constituency and its 6 segments
