= Manisha Ashok Chaudhary =

Indian politician

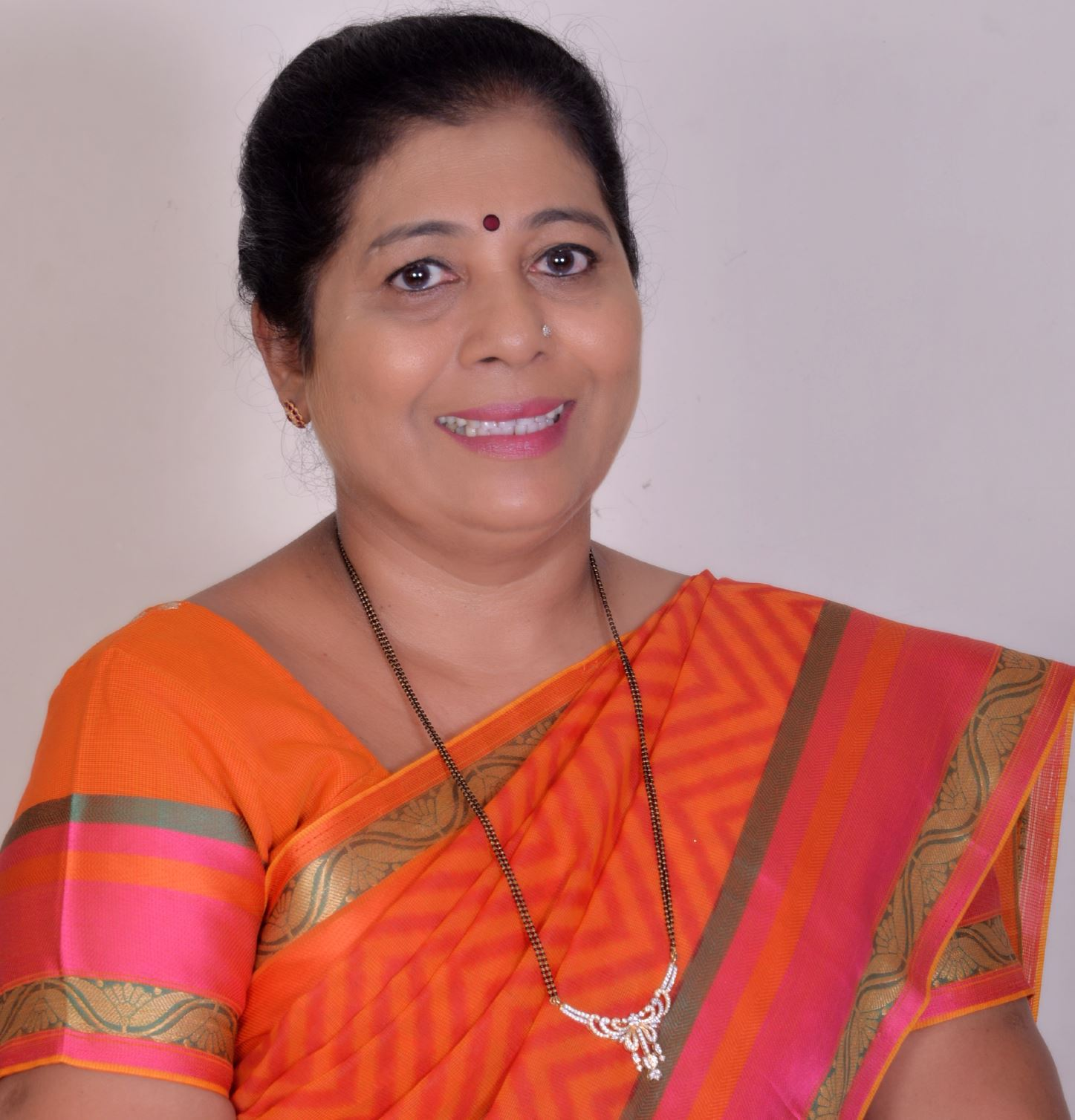

Member of the Maharashtra Legislative Assembly
- Incumbent
- Assumed office 2014–present
- Preceded by: Vinod Ghosalkar
- Constituency: Dahisar

Personal details
- Born: 18 June 1962 (age 64) CHANDRA NAGAR, MASOLI, DAHANU ROAD
- Party: Bharatiya Janata Party
- Children: 2
- Occupation: Politician
- Website: mahabjp.org

Manisha Ashok Chaudhary is an Indian politician from Maharashtra. She is a third term member of the Maharashtra Legislative Assembly representing the Bharatiya Janata Party. She won the 2024 Maharashtra Legislative Assembly election from Dahisar Assembly constituency in Mumbai Suburban districtfor the third straight time.

== Early life ==
Chaudhary is from Borivali, Mumbai Suburban district, Maharashtra. She married Ashok Chaudhary and together they have two children.

== Career ==
She served as the mayor of Dahanu Nagar Palike from 1998 to 2001. Later, she was the BMC corporator from Borivali from 2012 to 2014. She first became an MLA winning the 2014 Maharashtra Legislative Assembly election representing the Bharatiya Janata Party from Dahisar Assembly constituency. She defeated Vinod Ghosalkar of Shiv Sena by a margin of 38,578 votes. She retained the seat in the 2019 Maharashtra Legislative Assembly election defeating the Arun Sawant of the Indian National Congress by a margin of 63,917 votes. She was elected for the third time in the 2024 Maharashtra Legislative Assembly election beating Ghosalkar again, who contested this time on SS (UBT) ticket, by a margin of 44,329 votes.
