= Badi Didi =

- Theatrical release poster
- Directed by: Narendra Suri
- Written by: Sarshar Sailani (dialogues); Rajendra Krishan (lyrics)
- Screenplay by: Suhrid Kar
- Story by: Madhusudhan Kalilk
- Produced by: Narendra Suri; Nand Kumar
- Starring: Jeetendra; Nanda
- Cinematography: Aloke Das Gupta
- Edited by: Pratap Dav
- Music by: Ravi
- Production company: Archana Films
- Release date: 22 June 1969
- Running time: 158 minutes
- Country: India
- Language: Hindi

Badi Didi (transl. Elder Sister) is a 1969 Hindi-language drama film, produced by Narendra Suri and Nand Kumar under the Archana Films banner and directed by Narendra Suri. Starring Jeetendra, Nanda and music composed by Ravi.

== Cast ==
- Jeetendra as Lieutenant Amar Verma
- Nanda as Bhavna Prasad
- Mehmood as Madan
- Om Prakash as Dayal
- Jeevan as Lala
- Aruna Irani as Anita
- Padma Khanna as Aarti
- Leela Chitnis as Mother
- Nazir Hussain as Keshav Prasad
- Ulhas as Dindayal Verma
- Raj Mehra
- Polson
- Tun Tun
- Purnima

== Soundtrack ==
| Song | Singer |
|---|---|
| "Payal Bajati Chali Ho Kahan" | Mahendra Kapoor |
| "Hui Na Paida Ab Tak Apne Liye Koi Shehzadi" | Mahendra Kapoor, Manna Dey |
| "Ishq Ki Mala Hath Mein" | Manna Dey |
| "Kya Kya Rang Dikhaye" | Mohammed Rafi |
| "Sajna Kal Maine Dekha" | Asha Bhosle |
| "Is Desh Ko" | Asha Bhosle |
