= Malad West Assembly constituency =

Constituency of the Maharashtra legislative assembly in India

Coordinates: 19.192°N 72.825°E

Malad West
- Constituency No. 162 for the Maharashtra Legislative Assembly

Constituency details
- Country: India
- Region: Western India
- State: Maharashtra
- District: Mumbai Suburban
- Lok Sabha constituency: Mumbai North
- Established: 2008
- Total electors: 357,936
- Reservation: None

Member of Legislative Assembly
- 15th Maharashtra Legislative Assembly
- Incumbent Aslam Shaikh
- Party: INC
- Alliance: MVA
- Elected year: 2024

Malad West Assembly constituency is a constituency of the Maharashtra Legislative Assembly, located in the metropolis of Mumbai. It is one of the 26 Vidhan Sabha constituencies located in suburban Mumbai.

== Overview ==
Malad West constituency, is one of the 26 Vidhan Sabha constituencies located in the Mumbai Suburban district.

Malad West is part of the Mumbai North Lok Sabha constituency along with five other Vidhan Sabha segments, namely Borivali, Magathane, Dahisar, Kandivali East, and Charkop, in the Mumbai Suburban district.

== Members of the Legislative Assembly ==
Year	Member	Party
Till 2009 : Constituency did not exist
2009	Aslam Shaikh	Indian National Congress
2014	Aslam Shaikh	Indian National Congress
2019	Aslam Shaikh	Indian National Congress
2024	Aslam Shaikh	Indian National Congress

== Election results ==
=== Assembly Election 2024 ===
2024 Maharashtra Legislative Assembly election : Malad West
Party	Candidate	Votes	%	±%
INC	Aslam Ramzanali Shaikh	98,202	50.19	▼1.84
BJP	Vinod Shelar	91,975	47.01	▲1.77
NOTA	None of the Above	1,508	0.77	▼1.51
Margin of victory		6,227	3.18	▼3.61
Turnout		197,164	55.08	▲3.12
Total valid votes		195,656		
Registered electors		357,936		▲20.72
INC hold		Swing	▼1.84	

=== Assembly Election 2019 ===
2019 Maharashtra Legislative Assembly election : Malad West
Party	Candidate	Votes	%	±%
INC	Aslam Ramzanali Shaikh	79,514	52.03	▲14.32
BJP	Thakur Ramesh Singh	69,131	45.23	▲9.06
NOTA	None of the Above	3,490	2.28	▲1.14
Independent	Shakeel Hasan Patni	927	0.61	New
Margin of victory		10,383	6.79	▲5.26
Turnout		156,329	52.73	▲2.04
Total valid votes		152,828		
Registered electors		296,495		▼2.17
INC hold		Swing	▲14.32	

=== Assembly Election 2014 ===
2014 Maharashtra Legislative Assembly election : Malad West
Party	Candidate	Votes	%	±%
INC	Aslam Ramzanali Shaikh	56,574	37.70	▼5.78
BJP	Dr. Ram Barot	54,271	36.17	▲16.01
SS	Dr. Vinay Jain	17,888	11.92	New
MNS	Deepak Pandurang Pawar (Pappa)	14,425	9.61	▼4.24
Independent	Cyril Peter D'Souza	2,839	1.89	New
NOTA	None of the Above	1,714	1.14	New
NCP	Sunilbhau Shinde	951	0.63	New
Margin of victory		2,303	1.53	▼21.79
Turnout		151,765	50.07	▲6.95
Total valid votes		150,045		
Registered electors		303,083		▲8.63
INC hold		Swing	▼5.78	

=== Assembly Election 2009 ===
2009 Maharashtra Legislative Assembly election : Malad West
Party	Candidate	Votes	%	±%
INC	Aslam Ramzanali Shaikh	51,635	43.49	New
BJP	R. U. Singh	23,940	20.16	New
MNS	Desai Neela Padmakar	16,450	13.85	New
Independent	Deepak Pandurang Pawar (Pappa)	6,344	5.34	New
Independent	Sunil Koli	5,970	5.03	New
Independent	Austin Marcus Gracious	5,382	4.53	New
Independent	Dolphy D'Souza	2,947	2.48	New
Margin of victory		27,695	23.33	
Turnout		118,742	42.56	
Total valid votes		118,735		
Registered electors		279,017		
INC win (new seat)				

== See also ==
- Malad
- List of constituencies of Maharashtra Vidhan Sabha
