= Charkop Assembly constituency =

Constituency of the Maharashtra legislative assembly in India

Coordinates: 19.211°N 72.818°E

Charkop
- Constituency No. 161 for the Maharashtra Legislative Assembly

Constituency details
- Country: India
- Region: Western India
- State: Maharashtra
- District: Mumbai Suburban
- Lok Sabha constituency: Mumbai North
- Established: 2008
- Total electors: 317,443
- Reservation: None

Member of Legislative Assembly
- 15th Maharashtra Legislative Assembly
- Incumbent Yogesh Sagar
- Party: Bharatiya Janata Party
- Elected year: 2024

Charkop Assembly constituency is one of the 288 Vidhan Sabha (Legislative Assembly) constituencies in Maharashtra state in western India.

== Overview ==
Charkop (चारकोप) constituency is one of the 26 Vidhan Sabha constituencies located in the Mumbai Suburban district.

Charkop is part of the Mumbai North Lok Sabha constituency along with five other Vidhan Sabha segments, namely Borivali, Magathane, Dahisar, Kandivali East and Malad West in the Mumbai Suburban district.

== Members of the Legislative Assembly ==
Year	Member	Party
Till 2009 : Constituency did not exist
2009	Yogesh Sagar	Bharatiya Janata Party
2014	Yogesh Sagar	Bharatiya Janata Party
2019	Yogesh Sagar	Bharatiya Janata Party
2024	Yogesh Sagar	Bharatiya Janata Party

== Election results ==
=== Assembly Election 2024 ===
2024 Maharashtra Legislative Assembly election : Charkop
Party	Candidate	Votes	%	±%
BJP	Yogesh Sagar	127,355	70.33%	▼3.15
INC	Yashwant Jayprakash Singh	36,201	19.99%	▼3.40
MNS	Dinesh Salvi	15,200	8.39%	New
NOTA	None of the Above	2,313	1.28%	▼2.07
VBA	Dilip Gulabrao Lingayat	1,225	0.68%	▼1.04
Margin of victory		91,154	50.34%	▲0.26
Turnout		1,83,406	57.78%	▲6.02
Total valid votes		1,81,093		
Registered electors		3,17,443		▲9.99
BJP hold		Swing	▼3.15	

=== Assembly Election 2019 ===
2019 Maharashtra Legislative Assembly election : Charkop
Party	Candidate	Votes	%	±%
BJP	Yogesh Sagar	108,202	73.47%	▲12.77
INC	Kalu Budhelia	34,453	23.40%	▲9.67
NOTA	None of the Above	4,927	3.35%	▲2.48
VBA	Morris Benny Kinny	2,523	1.71%	New
BSP	Farukh Abdul Mannan Khan	1,037	0.70%	▲0.09
Margin of victory		73,749	50.08%	▲9.42
Turnout		1,52,220	52.74%	▲1.07
Total valid votes		1,47,265		
Registered electors		2,88,602		▼8.92
BJP hold		Swing	▲12.77	

=== Assembly Election 2014 ===
2014 Maharashtra Legislative Assembly election : Charkop
Party	Candidate	Votes	%	±%
BJP	Yogesh Sagar	96,097	60.71%	▲14.97
SS	Shubhada Subhash Gudekar	31,730	20.04%	New
INC	Bharat Parekh	21,733	13.73%	▼19.26
MNS	Deepak Amrut Desai	5,654	3.57%	▼14.56
NOTA	None of the Above	1,363	0.86%	New
BSP	Sunil Giri	973	0.61%	New
Margin of victory		64,367	40.66%	▲27.91
Turnout		1,59,729	50.41%	▲5.49
Total valid votes		1,58,296		
Registered electors		3,16,867		▲9.81
BJP hold		Swing	▲14.97	

=== Assembly Election 2009 ===
2009 Maharashtra Legislative Assembly election : Charkop
Party	Candidate	Votes	%	±%
BJP	Yogesh Sagar	58,687	45.74%	New
INC	Bharat Parekh	42,324	32.99%	New
MNS	Deepak Amrut Desai	23,268	18.13%	New
CPI	Akhilesh N. Gaud	1,539	1.20%	New
Margin of victory		16,363	12.75%	
Turnout		1,28,305	44.46%	
Total valid votes		1,28,305		
Registered electors		2,88,557		
BJP win (new seat)				

== See also ==
- Charkop
- List of constituencies of Maharashtra Vidhan Sabha
