= Yogesh Sagar =

Indian politician

Minister of State for Urban Development Government of Maharashtra
- In office 16 June 2019 – 8 November 2019
- Chief Minister: Devendra Fadnavis

Member of the Maharashtra Legislative Assembly
- Incumbent
- Assumed office 2009
- Preceded by: Constituency created
- Constituency: Charkop

Personal details
- Born: 4 October 1962 (age 63) Borivali, Mumbai Suburban district
- Party: Bharatiya Janata Party
- Occupation: Politician
- Website: mahabjp.org

Yogesh Sagar is an Indian politician and member of the Bharatiya Janata Party. He is a three term member of the Maharashtra Legislative Assembly. He is well known for his social work. He has also been awarded the ‘Best MLA Award’ for three consecutive years by Praja Foundation.

== Personal life ==
Born on 4 October 1962.

== Constituency ==
Yogesh Sagar was elected thrice from the Charkop (Vidhan Sabha constituency) Mumbai, Maharashtra.

== Positions held ==
- Maharashtra Legislative Assembly (MLA).
- Became Cabinet Minister & took oath on 17 June 2019
- Terms in office: 2009-2014 and 2014–2019.

== Term work ==
- Speaking about Co-Operative Housing Society Deemed Conveyance.
- Announced: Action will be taken on local schools who are not going to opt for Vaccination.
- Responded to the raised question by NCP member Rahul Narvekar on ensuring the equitable water supply through a Calling Attention notice in the state Legislative Council
- Addressed Brihanmumbai Municipal Corporation (BMC) to stop water cut.
- To lead Gujaratis in Maharashtra Cabinet.
- To set up technical advisory committee for dangerous buildings in Thane, Mumbai.
- Water and basic amenities will be provided for Colaba area of Mumbai.
- Supporting all the help required from Government of Maharashtra for Documentary filmmakers in screening at least four Sundays.
- Real Estate Sector - Choked by liquidity freeze, builders seek concessions, Ask government to cut premium, development charges by half.
- Announced INR 5 Lakhs to kin of the deceased - The death toll in Mumbai's Malad wall collapse incident in Maharashtra rose to 24 on Wednesday. A total of 78 people have also been injured in the incident which occurred due to heavy rainfall.

== Achievement ==
- Selected best MLA Mumbai for 3rd year in a row out of 32 MLAs (excluding four ministers) of Mumbai by NGO Praja Foundation.
