= Ram Naik =

Indian politician (born 1934)

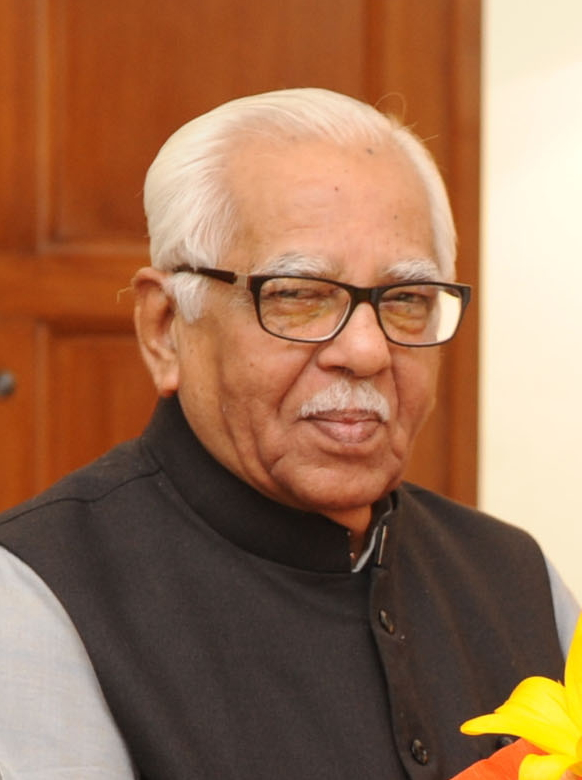
- Naik in 2019

19th Governor of Uttar Pradesh
- In office 22 July 2014 – 28 July 2019
- Chief Minister: Akhilesh Yadav; Yogi Adityanath
- Preceded by: Aziz Qureshi (additional charge)
- Succeeded by: Anandiben Patel

Governor of Rajasthan
- In office 8 August 2014 – 3 September 2014

Member of Parliament, Lok Sabha
- In office 1989–2004
- Preceded by: Anoopchand Shah
- Succeeded by: Govinda Ahuja
- Constituency: Mumbai North, Maharashtra

Union Minister of Railways
- In office 6 August 1999 – 12 October 1999
- Prime Minister: Atal Bihari Vajpayee
- Preceded by: Nitish Kumar
- Succeeded by: Mamata Banerjee

Union Minister of Petroleum and Natural Gas
- In office 1999–2004
- Prime Minister: Atal Bihari Vajpayee
- Succeeded by: Mani Shankar Aiyar

Personal details
- Born: 16 April 1934 (age 92) Sangli, Bombay Presidency, British India
- Party: Bharatiya Janata Party
- Spouse: Kunda Naik (m. 1960)
- Children: 2 daughters
- Profession: Politician
- Awards: Padma Bhushan (2024)
- Website: www.ramnaik.com

Ram Naik (born 17 April 1934) is a veteran Indian politician from the Bharatiya Janata Party who served as the 19th Governor of Uttar Pradesh.

== Political career ==
Ram Naik was a member of the 13th Lok Sabha and was Minister of Oil and Natural Gas in the Atal Bihari Vajpayee cabinet (1999–2004). He was instrumental in introducing Members of Parliament Local Area Development Scheme. He was the BJP candidate for elections to the 14th Lok Sabha representing Mumbai North, but lost to famous Bollywood actor Govinda, an INC candidate from Virar.

A Rashtriya Swayamsevak Sangh volunteer since childhood, he holds a law degree. He started his political career with the Bharatiya Jana Sangh in 1964 and was involved in organizing a group of rail commuters in Mumbai. He represented Borivali in the state assembly in 1978 and was re-elected twice, before becoming Minister of State for Railways in 1998, when he was influential in forming the Mumbai Railway Vikas Corporation.

In 2004 he published a statement in which he demanded apology from the Prime Minister Manmohan Singh and chairwoman Sonia Gandhi for removal of quotes from statues dedicated to the Indian revolutionaries, such as Subhas Chandra Bose, Madan Lal Dhingra, Vinayak Damodar Savarkar, Bhagat Singh, and Bahadur Shah Zafar.

Ram Naik announced in September 2013 that he will not contest the 2014 Lok Sabha Polls. On 14 July 2014 he was named as the Governor of Uttar Pradesh.

Within a few months of his being appointed governor, he stated that "The Ram Temple should be built as soon as possible, this is what the people of this country want and their wishes should be fulfilled." The theme was immediately backed up by Hindutva groups.

Subsequently, his Hindutva remarks seem to have been reined in by Narendra Modi.

== Personal life ==
He was born in Sangli district of Maharashtra state. He married Kunda Naik on 17 May 1960 and has two daughters.

== Positions held ==
- 1969–1977 – Organising Secretary, Bharatiya Jan Sangh, Mumbai
- 1977–1978 – General Secretary, Janata Party, Mumbai
- 1978–1989 – Member, Legislative Assembly of Maharashtra (3 terms)
- 1979–1980 – President, Janata Party, Mumbai
- 1980–1986 – President, BJP, Mumbai
- 1986–1989 – Vice President, BJP, Maharashtra
- 1989 – Elected to 9th Lok Sabha
- 1991 – Elected to 10th Lok Sabha
- 1999 – Elected to 13th Lok Sabha
- 1999–2004 – Union Cabinet Minister, Petroleum and Natural Gas
- since 2004 – President, All India Disciplinary Committee of BJP
- 2014–2019 Governor of Uttar Pradesh

Lok Sabha
Preceded by Anoopchand Shah	Member of Parliament for Mumbai North; 1989–2004	Succeeded by Govinda
Political offices
Preceded by	Minister of Petroleum and Natural Gas; 1999–2004	Succeeded by Mani Shankar Aiyar
Preceded by Aziz Qureshi; Additional Responsibility	Governor of Uttar Pradesh; 22 July 2014 – 28 July 2019	Succeeded by Anandiben Patel
