= Atul Bhatkhalkar =

Indian politician

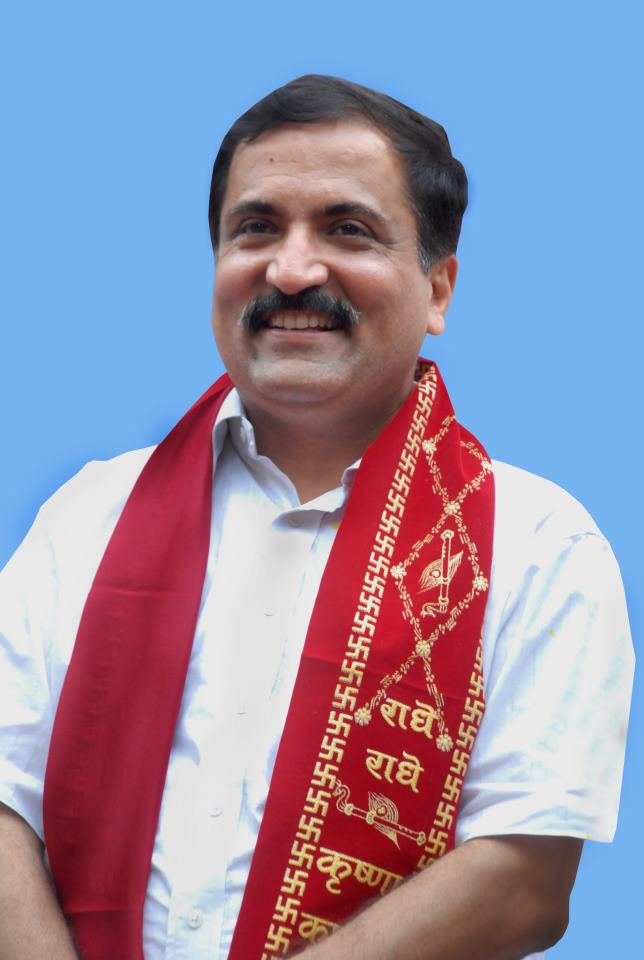
- Atulji picture

Member of the Maharashtra Legislative Assembly for Mumbai Kandivali East
- Incumbent
- Assumed office 2014
- Preceded by: Shivkumar Jha

Personal details
- Born: 8 March 1965 (age 61) Mumbai, Maharashtra, India
- Party: Bharatiya Janata Party
- Spouse: Rashmi Bhatkhalkar
- Children: Saumitra Bhatkhalkar
- Occupation: Politician
- Website: www.atulbhatkhalkar.com/home.html

Atul Bhatkhalkar (born 8 March 1965) is member of 13th Maharashtra Legislative Assembly who belongs to Bharatiya Janata Party. He is General Secretary of BJP Maharashtra State Unit.

Atul is known for his influential role as the spokesperson for Bhartiya Janta party from 1999 to 2001.

== Political and social career ==
Atul has been with Bhartiya Janta Party from June 1991, and was office secretary of the Party from September 1991. For four years, he participated as the secretary and publicity representative for the Bharatiya Janata Party in the Maharashtra Assembly Elections and Parliament elections.

- General Secretary, BJP, Maharashtra (2012)

=== Legislative ===
- Maharashtra Legislative Assembly, Since 2014
