= Aslam Shaikh =

Indian politician

Member of the Maharashtra Legislative Assembly
- Incumbent
- Assumed office 2009
- Preceded by: Constituency created
- Constituency: Malad West

Cabinet Minister Government of Maharashtra
- In office 30 December 2019 – 29 June 2022
- Governor: Bhagat Singh Koshyari
- Chief Minister: Uddhav Thackeray
- Ministry and Departments: Textiles; Fisheries Department; Ports Development
- Deputy CM: Ajit Pawar
- Preceded by: Ram Shinde (Textiles Ministry); Anil Bonde (Fisheries Ministry); Devendra Fadnavis (Ports Development)

Guardian minister of Mumbai City District Government of Maharashtra
- In office 9 January 2020 – 29 June 2022
- Constituency: Malad West

Personal details
- Born: 5 November 1972 (age 53) Mumbai, Maharashtra, India
- Party: Indian National Congress
- Spouse: Rizwana
- Education: St. Anthony's High School (1986)
- Occupation: Politician
- Profession: Business, Social Worker
- Website: Official Website

Aslam Shaikh is an Indian politician from the Indian National Congress. He is serving as Member of the Maharashtra Legislative Assembly representing the Malad West Assembly Constituency in Mumbai, Maharashtra. He was serving as the Textile, Fisheries Department & Ports Development Minister in the former Maha Vikas Aghadi cabinet.

Corona Pandemic Work

Aslam Shaikh made significant contributions during the Corona pandemic as the guardian minister of Mumbai. His efforts were widely recognized for effectively managing the crisis and implementing measures to mitigate its impact on the city's residents.
