= Narendra Suri =

Indian bollywood film director in '60s-'70s

Narendra Suri was an Indian bollywood film director in '60s-'70s. He had directed 6 films in hindi and produced a film Badi Didi in 1969. He was an associate director of Shikast hindi film directed by Ramesh Saigal in 1953.

== Filmography ==
- Begunah (1957)
- Lajwanti (1958)
- Majboor (1964)
- Purnima (1965)
- Badi Didi (1969)
- Vandana (1975)
