= Vinod Ghosalkar =

Indian politician

Chairman of Mumbai Building Repair And Reconstruction Board
- Incumbent
- Assumed office 2018

Member of Legislative Assembly of Maharashtra
- In office 2009–2014
- Constituency: Dahisar

Personal details
- Party: Shiv Sena
- Relatives: Abhishek Ghosalkar (Son), Tejasvi Ghosalkar (daughter in-law)
- Occupation: Politician

Vinod Ramchandra Ghosalkar is an Indian politician and leader of Shiv Sena from Mumbai, Maharashtra. He was member of Maharashtra Legislative Assembly from 2009 to 2014. Previously, he was also a corporator in the Municipal Corporation of Greater Mumbai. He remained with the Uddhav Thackeray camp during the 2022 split in the party. His son Abhishek Ghosalkar was shot dead in February 2024 while streaming live on Facebook by an assailant who was seen participating in functions with the Chief Minister Eknath Shinde. The assailant himself died soon afterwards while the murder case was ongoing. The police has ruled the assailant's death to be a case of suicide.

== Positions held ==
- 2009: Elected to Maharashtra Legislative Assembly
- 2010 Onwards: Deputy Leader, Shiv Sena
- 2014: Shiv Sena Sampark Pramukh Aurangabad district
- 2018: Appointed as chairman of Mumbai Building Repair And Reconstruction Board (Marathi: मुंबई इमारत दुरुस्‍ती व पुनर्रचना मंडळ)
