= Sanjay Upadhyay =

Indian politician

Member of Maharashtra Legislative Assembly
- Incumbent
- Assumed office 2024
- Preceded by: Sunil Rane
- Constituency: Borivali

Personal details
- Born: 28 May 1973 (age 52)
- Party: Bharatiya Janata Party
- Profession: Politician

Sanjay Upadhyay is an Indian politician from Maharashtra. He is a member of the Maharashtra Legislative Assembly from 2024, representing Borivali Assembly constituency as a member of the Bharatiya Janata Party.

== Political career ==
Sanjay Upadhyay is a member of the Rashtriya Swayamsevak Sangh (RSS), Since his Childhood a far-right Hindu nationalist paramilitary volunteer organisation.

== See also ==
- List of chief ministers of Maharashtra
- Maharashtra Legislative Assembly
