= Anoopchand Shah =

Indian politician (1934–2021)

Member of Parliament, Lok Sabha
- In office 1984–1989
- Preceded by: Ravindra Varma
- Succeeded by: Ram Naik
- Constituency: Mumbai North

Personal details
- Born: 20 March 1934 Wadhawana City, Gujarat, British India
- Died: April 2021 (aged 87)
- Party: Indian National Congress
- Spouse: Sarojben Anoopchand Shah

Anoopchand Khimchand Shah (20 March 1934 – April 2021) was an Indian politician belonging to the Indian National Congress. He was elected to the Lok Sabha, lower house of the Parliament of India from Mumbai North. Shah died in April 2021, at the age of 87.
