= Pashtane =

Village in Maharashtra

- city
- Location within Maharashtra
- Coordinates: 21.054182°N 75.316540°E
- Country: India
- State: Maharashtra
- Region: Khandesh
- District: Jalgaon

Government
  - Type: Grampanchayat
  - Body: Pashtane Grampanchayat

Area
  - Total: 15 km^{2} (5.8 sq mi)
- Elevation: 253 m (830 ft)

Population (2015)
  - Total: 2,500
  - Density: 170/km^{2} (430/sq mi)

Language
  - Official: Marathi, Ahirani
- Time zone: UTC+5:30 (IST)
- Postal code: 425-105
- Telephone code: 00-91-2588
- Vehicle registration: MH 19

Pashtane is a well-known village in Jalgaon district, India, situated nearly 30 km from Jalgaon and 7 km from Dharangaon a nearest Railway station.

== Geography and climate ==
Pashtane is a medium-sized village divided into 2 sub-villages, one is Pashtane Bk.(पष्टाणे बुद्रुक) and another is Pashtane Kh.(पष्टाणे खुर्द), located in Dharangaon Tehsil of Jalgaon district.

As per constitution of India and Panchyati Raaj Act, Pashtane village is administrated by Sarpanch (Head of Village) who is elected representative of the village.

Pashtane is on average 400–450 feet above sea level. As the Satpura Mountain Range just 30 km to the north, the bedrock is on an average 15–20 feet below the ground level.

Farming is the main occupation. An average rainfall is 550 mm The climate is hot for most of the year.

The maximum temperature reaches up to 46 °C in summer and minimum temperature falls up to 8 °C in the winter. Pashtane shares its boundary with Gangapuri, Dhanore, Anore, Garkhede, Tarde, Sonvad, Ukhalwadi, Kharde, Salwa, Hanumantkhede, Vaghlud, Chavalkhede, and Pimpri.

== Demographics ==
As of 2011 India census, with around 550 families residing. The Pashtane village has the population of 2372 of which 1222 are males while 1150 are females as per Population Census 2011.

In Pashtane village population of children with age 0-6 is 255 which makes up 10.75% of total population of village. Average Sex Ratio of Pashtane village is 951 which is higher than Maharashtra state average of 929. Child Sex Ratio for the Pashtane Bk. as per census is 728, lower than Maharashtra average of 894.

Pashtane village has lower literacy rate compared to Maharashtra. In 2011, a literacy rate of Pashtane village was 73.47% compared to 82.34% of Maharashtra. In Pashtane Male literacy stands at 82% while female literacy rate was 64.91%.

== Schools and Hospitals ==
- Schools
  - Madhyamil Vidyalay Pashtane
  - Adarsha Vidyamandir Upkendra Pashtane
- Hospital
  - Prathmik Aarogya Kendra Pashtane
- Post Office

== Festivals ==
- Yatra (every 6 months)
- Kirtans
