= Bahinabai Chaudhari =

Marathi language poet (1880–1951)

- Born: 24 August 1880 Asoda, Bombay Presidency, British India (in-present Jalgaon district, Maharashtra, India)
- Died: 3 December 1951 (aged 71) Jalgaon, Bombay State, India (in-present Maharashtra, India)
- Occupation: Farmer
- Language: Khandeshi, Marathi
- Education: None
- Period: 1880-1952
- Genre: Dramatic
- Subject: Father's house, life, farmer's life, harvest, agricultural equipment, Pola, Maharashtra's festivals
- Spouse: Nathu Chaudhari (m. 1893; died 1910)
- Children: 3

Bahinabai Chaudhari (24 August 1880 – 3 December 1951) was a Khandeshi language poet from Jalgaon district of Bombay State, India. She became a noted poet posthumously.

== Early life ==
Bahinabai was born in a Mahajan family at Asode in Khandesh region of the present-day Jalgaon district on the 24 August 1880, on the day of Naga Panchami. Her mother's name was Bhimai, and her father's name was Ukhaji Mahajan. She had three brothers - Ghama, Gana, and Ghana, and three sisters - Ahilya, Sita, and Tulsa. At the age of 13, in 1893, she was married to Nathuji Khanderao Chaudhari of Jalgaon. Following her husband's death in 1910, she led a very difficult life because of the economic, social, cultural, and emotional circumstances arising out of widowhood. She had a daughter named Kashi and two sons, Omkar and Sopandev (1907-1982).

== Poetic compositions ==
Bahinabai composed her songs verbally in ovi (ओवी) metre in a mixture of two dialects: Khandeshi and Levaganboli. Her son Sopandev, who became a well-known poet, transcribed them. According to one account, Sopandev read the story of Savitri and Satyavan to his mother from his textbook, and by the next morning, she had composed a song of the tale. Impressed by her talent, he began writing down of her songs in a notebook. Her poetry is characterized as reflective and abstract with iconic and realist imagery. It captures the essence of her life, reflects the culture of village and farming life, and presents her wisdom.

== Posthumous publication ==
After his mother's death on 3 December 1951, Sopandev found the notebook and shared one of her poems with Prahlād Keshav (Acharya) Atre's attention. Atre recounts calling the first of Bahinabai's poems he heard "pure gold" in his introduction to the collection published under the title Bahinabainchi gani (Bahinabai's Songs) in 1952 by Suchitra Prakashan.

== Legacy ==
- North Maharashtra University was renamed the Kavayitri Bahinabai Chaudhari North Maharashtra University in her honour.
- Yashwantrao Chavan Maharashtra Open University has recommended Bahinabainchi Gani as a part of their curriculum since June 2012.
- Balbharati includes her poems in school textbooks of Marathi language in Maharashtra state board schools.
