= Dahiwad =

Dahiwad may refer to following places:

- Dahiwad, Amalner; a village in Amalner taluka of Jalgaon district of Maharashtra state of India.
- Dahiwad, Shirpur; a village in Shirpur taluka of Dhule district of Maharashtra state of India.
