= Dahiwad, Amalner =

Village in Maharashtra, India

Dahiwad
- Village
- Location in Maharashtra, India Dahiwad (India)
- Coordinates: 21.077374°N 75.18915°E
- Country: India
- State: Maharashtra
- District: Jalgaon

Government
  - Type: Gram Panchayat

Population (2011)
  - Total: 7,000

Languages
  - Official: Marathi
- Time zone: UTC+5:30 (IST)
- PIN: 425401
- Telephone code: 02587
- Vehicle registration: MH-19
- Nearest city: Chopda
- Lok Sabha Constituency: Jalgaon
- Vidhan Sabha Constituency: Amalner

Dahiwad is a village in Amalner taluka and Jalgaon district in the state of Maharashtra, India. It is located around 17 kilometers from Amalner. Dahiwad is home to Navbharat Secondary & Higher Secondary High School. This village is for Khandoba's Yatra (Baara Gada).

== Language ==
People in this village speak Ahirani and Marathi language.

== Gram Panchayat ==
Dahiwad has an active Gram panchayat which is known as local government. People in this village are very active in political activities and contribute in district politics.

== Geography ==
It has average elevation of 183 metres from sea level.

== Demographics ==
As of 2011 Census, Dahiwad had a population of 7,000. Dahiwad's zipcode is 425401 and Telephone area code is 02587.

== Educational Institutes ==
Dahiwad has a Marathi medium school established in 1914 and has educational facilities up to 12th grade for Dahiwad and nearby villages Student.

== Occupations and Economy ==
The dominant occupation in the village is farming. Cotton, wheat, groundnuts, jowar, bajra, dadar and vegetables are the main crop products of the village. Other people have opted for professions such as dairy farming or operation of restaurants, retail stores, garages, etc. Over more than 20 young people from the village are serving in state and central defence forces.

== Cultural activities ==
Cultural activities are a core attribute of Dahiwad. Shiv Jayanti, Ganesh Chaturthi, Krishna Jamanshtami, Navratri, Hanuman Jayanti, Ram Navami, Makar Sankranti, Gudhi Padwa, Akshay Tritya (Aakhaji), Pola, Dasra, Holi, and Diwali are the main festivals celebrated together in Dahiwad. During the Makar Sankranti and Dasra celebrations, people meet each other and do Pranam to elders, while distributing sweets (Til Gul) and Gold (Aptyachi Pane).

== Medical Facilities ==
Dahiwad has a Primary Health Center (PHC) managed by Government. Most of the people go to PHC for basic treatment of common diseases and vaccination of their children.

== See also ==
- Amalner
- Amalner Railway Station
