= Kingaon =

Village in Maharashtra

- Village
- Location in Maharashtra, India Kingaon (India)
- Coordinates: 21.210605°N 75.577224°E
- Country: India
- State: Maharashtra
- District: Jalgaon

Languages
  - Official: Marathi
- Time zone: UTC+5:30 (IST)
- PIN: 425302
- Vehicle registration: MH 19

Kingaon is a village in Yawal taluka of Jalgaon district, Maharashtra, India. It is located between the foot hill of Satpura mountain and the bank of Tapti River. Kingaon is 25 km from the city of Jalgaon. Majority of the population consisting of farmers with banana & onion as the major product.

Kingaon is a developing village. This village is going to a bigger village on the new highway from Burhanpur(MP) - Umapur - Jalgaon Jamod - Sangrampur - Warwat - Telhara - Warula on MH 24, SH 195and also SH 4.From Maharashtra - Madhya Pradesh state border - Loni (Raver Taluka) - Raver - Yawal - Chopda - Lasur - Shirpur - Shahada - Talode - Akkalkuwa - Nawapada (Akkalkuva Taluka) - Uptill Maharashtra - Gujarat state border.

== Transport ==
- Bus: Kingaon is located on the Burhanpur-Ankaleshwar SH-4 and is well connected with District Headquarter- Jalgaon and with other main cities of district like Yawal, Bhusawal, Raver, Chopada by bus.
- Rail:The nearest major railway stations are Bhusaval and Jalgaon Junction.
- AirPort: Nearest airport is Jalgaon Airport.
- Road : two highway go from this village one is SH 24 and SH 4.

== Places to visit ==
- Manudevi Temple, 14 km from the village
- Unapdev - holy place and hot water spring
