= Javkhede =

Village in Maharashtra

- village
- Location in Maharashtra, India Javkhede (India)
- Coordinates: 21°2′N 74°54′E
- Country: India
- State: Maharashtra
- District: Jalgaon

Government
  - Body: Gram Panchayat
- Elevation: 217 m (712 ft)

Languages
  - Official: Marathi
- Time zone: UTC+5:30 (IST)
- Nearest city: Amalner
- Lok Sabha constituency: Jalgaon
- Vidhan Sabha constituency: Amalner
- Civic agency: Gram Panchayat

Javkhede is a village in Jalgaon district, tehsil Amalner in state of Maharashtra, India. The population of Javkhede is about 5,000.

It is situated on banks of a nullah. It lies on the border of Dhule and Jalgaon districts and located between the villages of Mohadi and Vavade.

Majority of people speak Ahirani language (a dialect of Marathi). Most of the residents are farmers. Popular crops are cotton, Bajra, wheat, and groundnut. Javkhede was awarded 'Adarsh gaon' (ideal village) on the national level by a trust headed by noted social activist Anna Hazare for work on irrigation and water conservation.

Javkhede is famous for "Gaadipeeth of Dutta" (a Hindu God). The biggest festival of this village is "Datta Jayanti" – on this day, a religious procession is held in the village. Many devotees come to pray on this occasion.

== Geography ==
Javkhede is located in the Jalgaon district. It has average elevation of 217 metres (712 feet).
