= Pimpale Sim =

Village in Maharashtra

Pimplesim
- Village
- Location in Maharashtra, India Pimplesim (India)
- Coordinates: 21.02°N 75.27°E
- Country: India
- State: Maharashtra
- Region: Khandesh
- District: Jalgaon

Government
  - Type: Sarpanch, Grampanchayat
  - Body: Grampanchayat
  - Sarpanch: Shri. Govinda Jagan More

Area
  - Total: 12 km^{2} (4.6 sq mi)
- Elevation: 253 m (830 ft)

Population (2017)
  - Total: 1,690
  - Density: 140/km^{2} (360/sq mi)

Language
  - Official: Gujar,
- Time zone: UTC+5:30 (IST)
- Postal code: 425-105
- Telephone code: 00-91-2588
- Vehicle registration: MH 19

PimpleSim is a village in Jalgaon district, Maharashtra, India, located about 25 km west of Jalgaon. In 2017, the population was 1,690 people with 852 males and 838 females.

== Economy ==
Agriculture is the main occupation of the people. Cotton, Jowar, Wheat, Green Vegetables etc. are the main crops harvested all year round. Villagers go to Dharangaon, Maharashtra for shopping or health treatment.

== Geography & Climate ==
Pimplesim is on average 455 feet above sea level. As the Satpura Mountain Range just 30 km north of Chopda, the bedrock is on an average 10 meters below the ground level. The soil above the bedrock is good for farming except in some areas. Average rainfall is 552 mm[8]. The climate is hot for most of the year. Maximum temperature reaches up to 48 °C in summer and minimum temperature fall up to 9 °C in the winter. The climate of Pimplesim is on the whole dry except during the south-west monsoon season and winter months December to February. The year may be divided into four seasons. The cold season from December to February. Hot and dry season from March to June. The south-west monsoon season starts from the last week of June and last up to the end of September. The post-monsoon season October and November remains hot and dry.
