= Satpuda Manudevi Temple, Adgaon =

Satpuda Manudevi Temple

Religion
- Affiliation: Hinduism
- District: Jalgaon

Location
- Location: Adgaon village in Yawal Taluka
- State: Maharashtra
- Country: India
- Interactive map of Satpuda Manudevi Temple

The Manudevi Temple is located near Adgaon village in Yawal Taluka, in Jalgaon district, Satpura Range, Maharashtra, India. Manudevi is the kuldevi of 70% of the people in Jalgaon district.

The temple features a nearby artificial lake. Manudevi is worshipped by most of Khandeshi and nearby people. The Goddess is believed to be Kuldevata of many families including the Baviskar Family. Villagers celebrate the festival of Navratri at Bormaal and also arrange small fairs with devotees visiting temples for nine days.

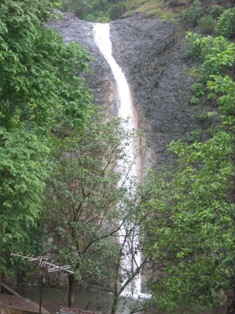
