= Kasoda =

Village in Maharashtra

Coordinates: 20°49′N 75°18′E

Kasoda is a village in Erandol, Jalgaon district, in the Indian state of Maharashtra. Kasoda is 48 km from Jalgaon and 322 km from Mumbai. Kasoda is the second biggest village in Jalgaon district. The name Kasoda is derived from kushada which was related to name of a saint who spent most of his life in jungles.

== Demographics ==
As per census 2011, population is about 35,000. Kasoda residents span castes and religions.

== Economy ==
Bazaar day is Tuesday; people from nearly 20 villages come to Kasoda, and the cattle market is open. Vasant Sahakari sugar factory is there.

The area is known for rich soil and productive lands. Farmers cultivate cotton, bajra, soybean, jowar, and variety of pulses. Kasoda is also famous for manufacturing the handmade 'Zore'.

== Infrastructure ==
Tap water is delivered every 5 days.

The nearest place from Kasoda is Chalisgaon. Farkande is 3 km (1.9 mi) from Kasoda, with the unique and historical monument of the swinging tower of Farkande.

== Culture ==
One of the biggest festivals is Harinaam Sapttah. Thousands of people celebrate Kakada aarti. Sant Govind maharaj stayed there and renovated Padmalay temple.
