= Pilode =

Village in Maharashtra, India

Pilode is a village located in Amalner Tehsil of Jalgaon district in Maharashtra, India. It is situated 10 km away from sub-district headquarter Amalner and 65 km away from district headquarter Jalgaon.

== Introduction ==
Pilode is located in the Khandesh and Northern Maharashtra region. It belongs to Nashik Division. According to Census 2011 information, the location code or village code of Pilode village is 527436. Pilode village is located in Amalner Tehsil of Jalgaon district in Maharashtra, India. It is situated 10 km away from sub-district headquarter Amalner and 65 km away from district headquarter Jalgaon. As per 2009 stats, Pilode village is also a gram panchayat.

The total geographical area of village is 1277 hectares. Pilode has a total population of 2,634 people. There are about 570 houses in Pilode village. Amalner is nearest town to Pilode which is approximately 10 km away.

== Climate ==
The climate in Pilode is referred to as a local steppe climate. During the year there is little rainfall. This climate is considered to be BSh according to the Köppen-Geiger climate classification. The average annual temperature is 27.4 °C in Pilode. The rainfall here averages 697 mm.

== See also ==
- Jalgaon district
- Maharashtra
