= Erandol =

- City
- Location in Maharashtra
- Coordinates: 20.9167°N 75.3333°E
- Country: India
- State: Maharashtra
- District: Jalgaon

Government
  - Type: Municipal corporation
  - Body: Erandol municipal council

Area
  - Total: 7 km^{2} (2.7 sq mi)
- Elevation: 226 m (741 ft)

Population (2001)
  - Total: 31,071
  - Density: 4,400/km^{2} (11,000/sq mi)
- Demonym: Erandolkar

Language
  - Official: Marathi,
  - Other languages: Ahirani, English
- Time zone: UTC+5:30 (IST)
- PIN: 425109
- +91: 02588
- Vehicle registration: MH-54, previously MH-19

Erandol is a town and a taluka in the Jalgaon district in the Indian state of Maharashtra. It is situated on the banks of the Anjani River.

== Folklore ==
Erandol was known as "Ek Chakra Nagari" in the time of the Pandavas. Later, the town's name was Arunawati.

== Geography ==
Erandol is situated in the Tapi valley of the Deccan Plateau, between the Satpura and Ajanta hills. Anjani River passes through the town, and Anjani Dam lies nearby.

Erandol shares borders with the talukas of Dharangaon, Pachora, Bhadgaon, and Parola.

== Demographics ==
Erandol has population of 31,071, of which 16,000 are males while 15,071 are females across 6,235 households, as per the 2011 Census. The population of children aged 0–6 is 3,916, or 12.60% of the population. The female sex ratio is 942 against the state average of 929. The literacy rate of Erandol is 76.67%, lower than the state average of 82.34%, with male literacy at 81.93% and female literacy at 71.13%.

Year	Male	Female	Total Population	Change								
Year	Male	Female	Total Population	Change	Hindu	Muslim	Christian	Sikhs	Buddhist	Jain	Other religions and persuasions	Religion not stated
2001	15562	14558	30120	-	75.691	22.092	0.040	0.113	1.790	0.153	0.103	0.020
2011	16000	15071	31071	0.032	73.248	24.769	0.071	0.457	1.242	0.132	0.003	0.077

== Administration ==
Erandol Municipal Council supplies basic amenities like water and sewerage. It is authorized to build roads and impose taxes on properties under its jurisdiction.

== Transport ==
National Highway 6, which connects Mumbai, Surat and Nagpur, Kolkata links Erandol with Dhule to the west, and Jalgaon to the east. Erandol has its own MSRTC bus depot and bus stand too. There are daily bus services available from Erandol to many cities of Maharashtra and also neighboring States like Madhya Pradesh (Indore, Burhanpur, Khargone, Khandwa, Barwani) and Gujarat (Surat, Vadodara, Ahmedabad, Valsad, Vyara). The nearest railway station is Dharangaon on the Bhusawal - Surat Line, about 12 km away, and Mhasawad on the Mumbai - Bhusawal Line, about 14 km away, Jalgaon is approx 30 km from Erandol which is a junction station of Bhusawal, Surat, Mumbai, line. Nearest airports are Jalgaon 30 km, Aurangabad 160 km, Nashik 200 km.

== Climate ==
Climate data for Erandol Dist Jalgaon
Month	Jan	Feb	Mar	Apr	May	Jun	Jul	Aug	Sep	Oct	Nov	Dec	Year
Mean daily maximum °C (°F)	30.4 (86.7)	32.7 (90.9)	37.5 (99.5)	40.9 (105.6)	42.5 (108.5)	37.8 (100.0)	31.4 (88.5)	31.4 (88.5)	31.6 (88.9)	34.1 (93.4)	31.8 (89.2)	29.8 (85.6)	34.3 (93.8)
Mean daily minimum °C (°F)	12.6 (54.7)	14.3 (57.7)	18.6 (65.5)	24.1 (75.4)	27.2 (81.0)	26.1 (79.0)	23.9 (75.0)	23.5 (74.3)	22.8 (73.0)	19.2 (66.6)	14.5 (58.1)	11.9 (53.4)	19.9 (67.8)
Average precipitation mm (inches)	8.9 (0.35)	3.1 (0.12)	4.1 (0.16)	0 (0)	10.7 (0.42)	128.8 (5.07)	249.7 (9.83)	164.1 (6.46)	148.6 (5.85)	37.3 (1.47)	22.1 (0.87)	7.4 (0.29)	784.8 (30.89)
Source: Jalgaon Weather
