= Chaubari =

Village in Maharashtra, India

- Village
- Location in Maharashtra, India Chaubari (India)
- Coordinates: 21.111846°N 74.985766°E
- Country: India
- State: Maharashtra
- District: Jalgaon

Population (2001)
  - Total: 1,236

Languages
  - Official: Marathi
- Time zone: UTC+5:30 (IST)
- PIN: 425402

Chaubari is a village in Amalner Tehsil, Jalgaon district. Chaubari is 12 km from Amalner on Amalner-Shindkheda Road.

Chaubari's near village is jaitphir. Jaitphir is 1km from chaubari.
