= Bhusawal taluka =

Region of Jalgaon, Maharashtra, India

- Taluka
- Country: India
- State: Maharashtra
- District: Jalgaon
- Named for: Bhusawal

Area
  - Total: 418.60 km^{2} (161.62 sq mi)

Population (2011)
  - Total: 359,461
  - Density: 858.72/km^{2} (2,224.1/sq mi)
- Demonym(s): Bhusawlkar, Bhusawalvaya
- Time zone: UTC+5:30 (IST)

Bhusawal taluka is a taluka in the Jalgaon district of Maharashtra, India. It is situated in North Maharashtra. Named after its largest city, Bhusawal, it has 50 villages and four towns.

== History ==
During the British Raj period of the 1850s-60s, railway tracks were built in the area now known as Bhusawal taluka.

It was officially known as Bhusawl peta until 1917. It was part of the Khandesh district until 1906, when the district was divided to form West Khandesh and East Khandesh, it became part of East Khandesh.

Bhusawal and 13 other historical sections known as petas—including Amalner, Parola, and the Edlabad peta (which is now part of Muktainagar taluka)—were once incorporated into the East Khandesh district. In the subsequent restructuring in 1917, Bhusawal, along with other petas from Khandesh, was elevated to taluka status. Until 1956 it was part of Bombay Presidency.

In a major administrative overhaul in 1956, the taluka was integrated into the Bombay state. In 1960, the Bombay state underwent a division based on linguistic lines, leading to the creation of the Maharashtra state. As a result, Bhusawal taluka became a part of Maharashtra.

In 1993, the first, and so far only, first class cricket match held in the taluka was organised at the Central railway ground in Bhusawal, in which Maharashtra defeated Tamil Nadu.

== Geography ==
Bhusawal taluka is located in the historical Khandesh region. It has a population of 359,461. The taluka is bordered by Muktainagar taluka to the east, Jalgaon taluka to the west, and by the Yawal and Raver talukas to the north.

The Tapi river flows through Bhusawal taluka. The river serves as a natural boundary to the Raver and Yawal talukas. The Vaghur river on the western border separates it from the Jalgaon taluka.

Bhusawal railway station and Bhusawal railway division are also located there. A large thermal power plant is present at the town of Deepnagar.

Nahata College in Bhusawal is the oldest and biggest college in the taluka, and is one of the oldest colleges in Jalgaon district, established in the 1960s. All the colleges in this taluka, as well as those in North Maharashtra, are affiliated with the North Maharashtra University.
