= Chahardi =

Village in Maharashtra, India

- Village
- Location within Maharashtra Location within India
- Coordinates: 21°13′20″N 75°13′57″E
- Country: India
- State: Maharashtra
- District: Jalgaon
- Taluka: Chopda
- Elevation: 182 m (597 ft)

Population (2011)
  - Total: 11,115
- Time zone: UTC+5:30 (Indian Standard Time)
- PIN: 425107

Chahardi is a village in Chopda Taluka, Jalgaon District, Maharashtra, India. It is located at the north of Tapti River, approximately 44 kilometres northwest of the district seat Jalgaon. It is 8 kilometres southwest of the subdistrict seat Chopda. As of the year 2010, it has a total population of 11,115.

== Geography ==
Chahardi is near the northern state border of Maharashtra. It is situated to the south of Akulkhede, west of Vele, north of Nimgavhan, and east of Dhupe Bk. The village has an average elevation of 182 metres above the sea level.

== Climate ==
Chahardi is under the Tropical Savanna Climate (Aw) according to the Köppen Climate Classification. It sees the most rainfall in July, with 265 mm of average precipitation; and the least in April, with 1 mm of average precipitation.

Climate data for Chahardi
Month	Jan	Feb	Mar	Apr	May	Jun	Jul	Aug	Sep	Oct	Nov	Dec	Year
Mean daily maximum °C (°F)	28.4 (83.1)	31.4 (88.5)	35.8 (96.4)	39.8 (103.6)	40.2 (104.4)	35.5 (95.9)	30.1 (86.2)	29.1 (84.4)	30.6 (87.1)	32.6 (90.7)	31.1 (88.0)	28.7 (83.7)	32.8 (91.0)
Daily mean °C (°F)	21.3 (70.3)	24.1 (75.4)	28.2 (82.8)	32.3 (90.1)	33.1 (91.6)	30.4 (86.7)	27 (81)	26.1 (79.0)	26.7 (80.1)	26.8 (80.2)	24.5 (76.1)	21.7 (71.1)	26.9 (80.4)
Mean daily minimum °C (°F)	14.5 (58.1)	16.8 (62.2)	20.4 (68.7)	24.5 (76.1)	26.5 (79.7)	26.2 (79.2)	24.6 (76.3)	23.7 (74.7)	23.4 (74.1)	21.5 (70.7)	18.4 (65.1)	15.3 (59.5)	21.3 (70.4)
Average rainfall mm (inches)	2 (0.1)	2 (0.1)	2 (0.1)	1 (0.0)	5 (0.2)	119 (4.7)	265 (10.4)	255 (10.0)	156 (6.1)	38 (1.5)	9 (0.4)	5 (0.2)	859 (33.8)
Source: Climate-Data.org

== Demographics ==
According to the 2011 Indian Census, there are 11,115 inhabitants within 2,535 households of the village. Among the total population, 5,781 are male residents and 5,334 are female residents. The literacy rate for the village is at 69.07%, with 4,284 of the male population and 3,393 of the female population being literate.
