= Amoda =

Village in Maharashtra

- town
- Location in Maharashtra, India Amoda (India)
- Coordinates: 21°8′55″N 75°49′42″E
- Country: India
- State: Maharashtra
- District: Jalgaon

Population
  - Total: 9,500

Languages
  - Official: Marathi
- Time zone: UTC+5:30 (IST)
- Lok Sabha constituency: Raver
- Vidhan Sabha constituency: Raver
- Climate: MH- (Köppen)

Amoda is a small village in the Jalgaon District of Maharashtra, India. It is on Bhusawal-Raver road. It is 5 km from faizpur & Just 13 km from Bhusawal railway junction.

The village population is around 6000. The people living in the village are various communities such as Leva Patil, kolis, navis, Buddhist, pavari, pinjari and tadavi.

Here, 95% of the people depend on banana and sugarcane farms. In Amode two primary schools and one higher secondary school are available for education.
