= Fapore Bk =

Village in Maharashtra, India

Coordinates: 21.05°N 75.05°E

Fapore Bk is a village about 6 kilometres (3.7 mi) south of Amalner in the state of Maharashtra, India. The Bori River runs alongside the village.
