= Mhasawad =

Mhasawad may refer to any of the following places in Maharashtra, India:

- Mhasawad, Jalgaon district
- Mhaswad Dam in Satara district
- Mhasawad, Nandurbar district, a village in Shahada taluka
