= Pal, Jalgaon district =

Village in Maharashtra

Pal
- Village
- Location within Maharashtra
- Coordinates: 21.36°N 75.90°E
- Country: India
- State: Maharashtra
- Region: Khandesh
- District: Jalgaon

Government
  - Type: Grampanchayat

Area
  - Total: 228 km^{2} (88 sq mi)
- Elevation: 397 m (1,302 ft)

Population (2011)
  - Total: 7,041
  - Density: 30.9/km^{2} (80.0/sq mi)

Languages
  - Official: Marathi
- Time zone: UTC+5:30 (IST)
- ZIP code(s): 425-504
- Telephone code: 02-584

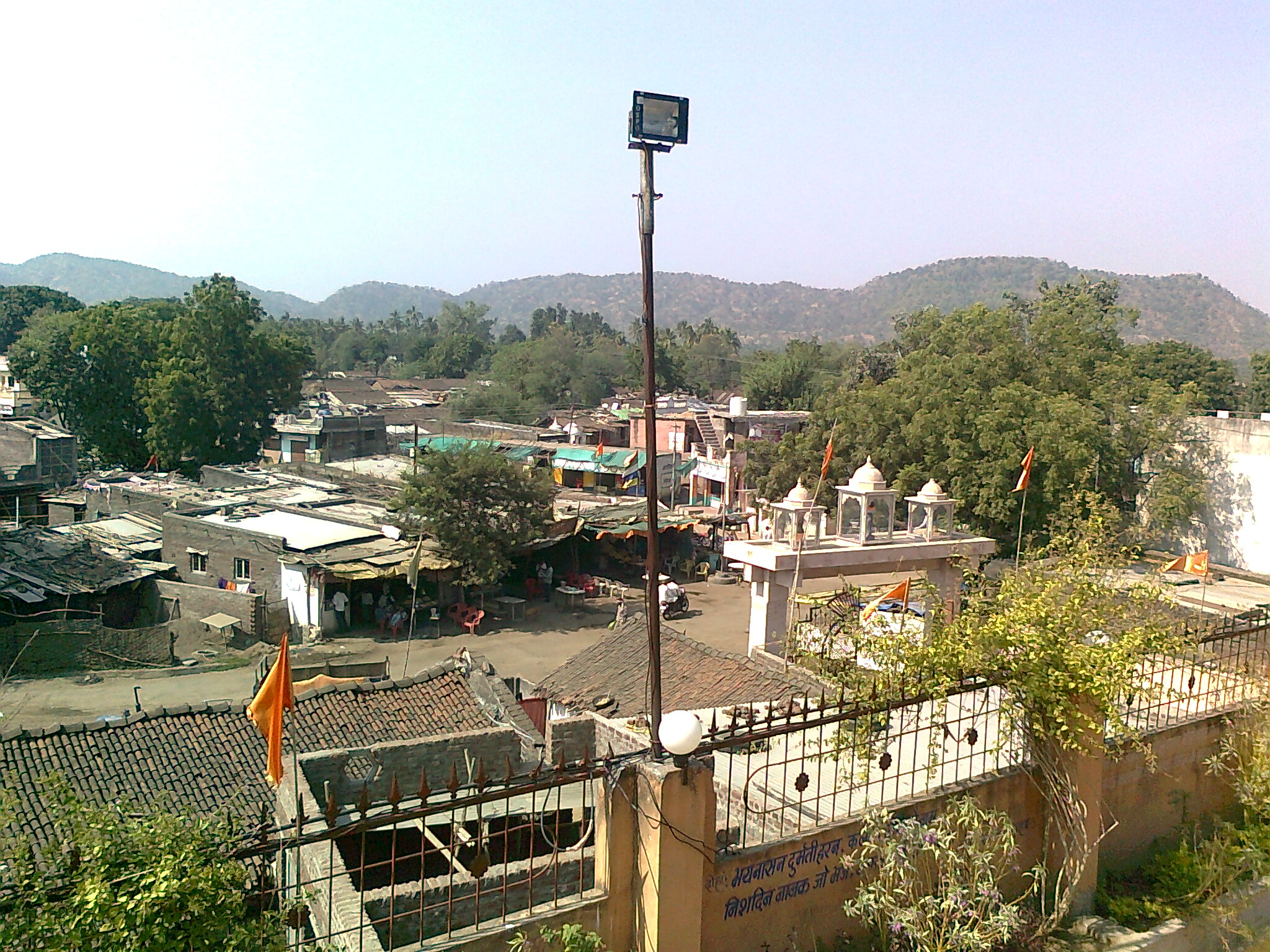
View of Pal village from Shri Krishna mandir in Pal

Pal is a village situated in Satpura range on the bank of the Suki River in Raver tehsil in Jalgaon district of Maharashtra state of India.

== History ==
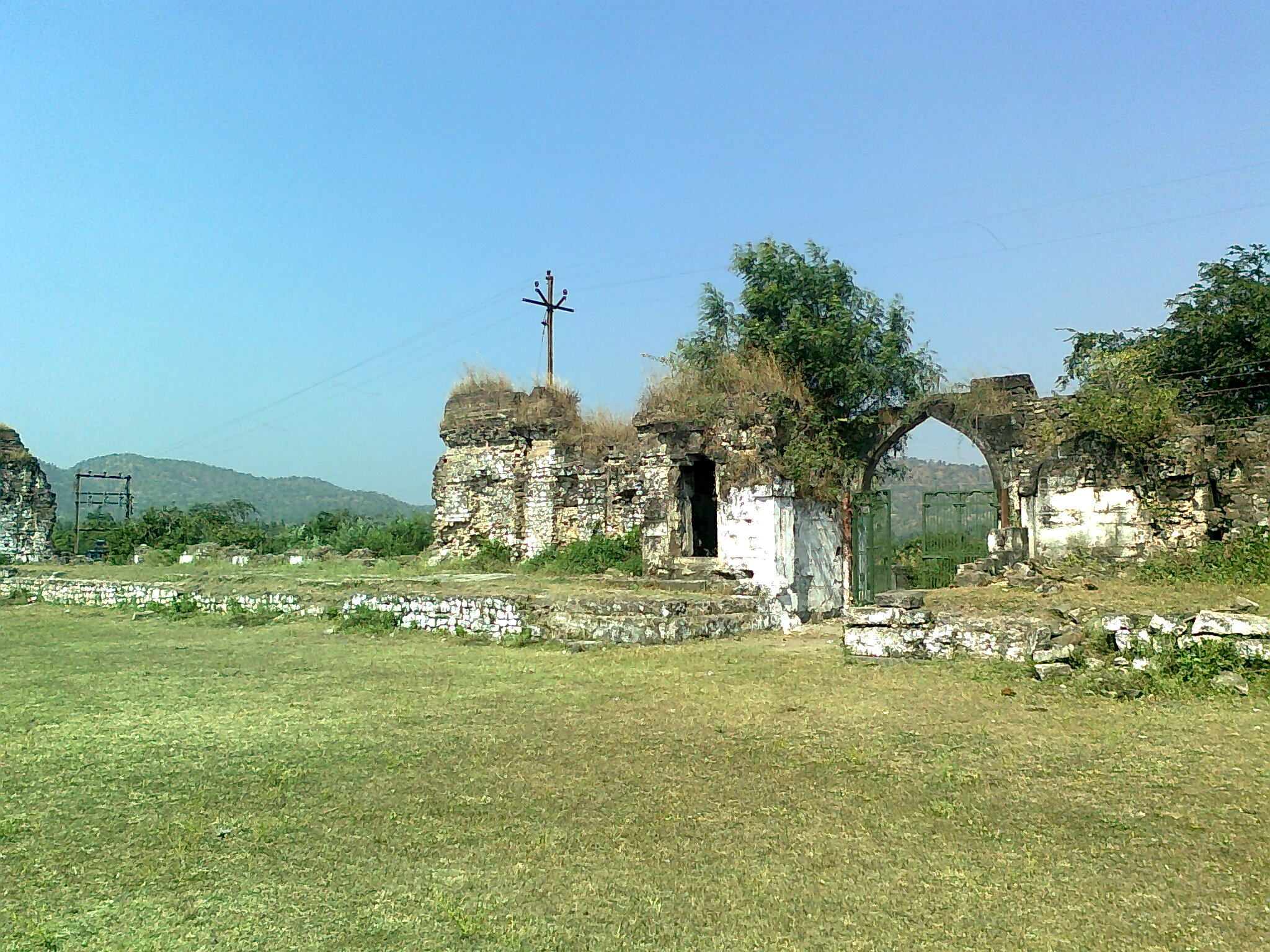
Ancient and now defunct Hathi Wada in Pal village

Pal was abandoned at the beginning of the eighteenth century. When British rule began in Khandesh in 1817, they found Pal village desolate and infested with wild animals. Subhedar Nimbalkar of Yawal made an offer to British to re-populate the village in return of money, but Captain Briggs refused the offer. Since 1820, many attempts were made to re-populate the Pal village. In 1869–70, C. S. James encouraged some farmers to settle in Pal village and the village was re-settled. In 1880, population of Pal village was 600. Historical records mention existence of fort, Mosque and Hathi (elephant) wada in the Pal village.

== Geography ==
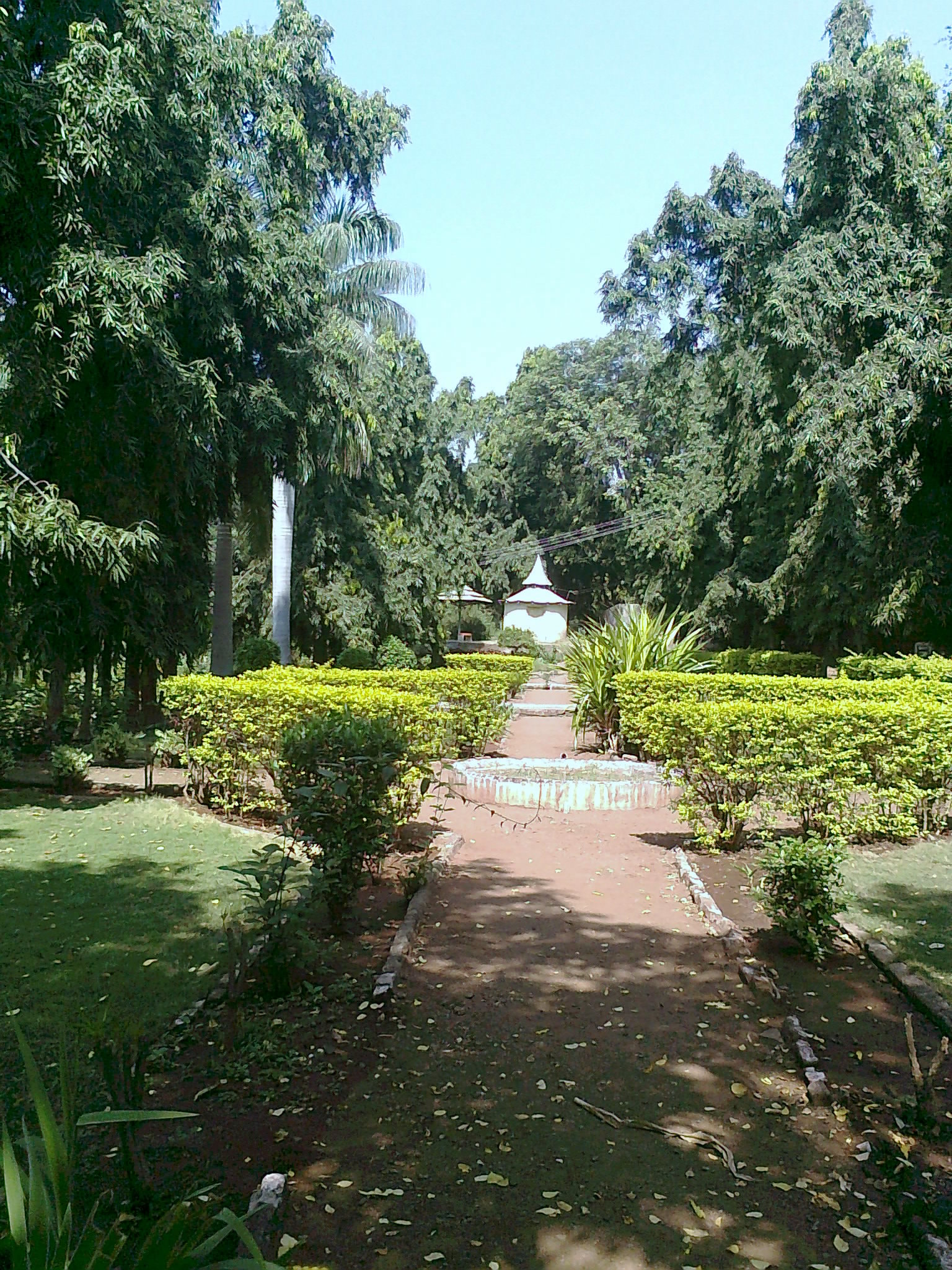
Garden at Pal village

Pal village is located at 21.361853°N 75.902929°E. It has average elevation of 397 meters from the sea level. Due to its high elevation and isolated nature in Satpura mountains surrounded by forests, Pal is locally known as picnic spot and hill station. Forest surrounding Pal village falls under protected area of Yawal Wildlife Sanctuary, but the village itself falls under the jurisdictional area of the Raver tehsil.

== Demographics ==
As per 2011 Census of India, Pal village had 1471 households with population of 7041 people, of which 3676 are males while 3365 are females. There were 1047 children between age group 0–6. Average Sex Ratio of Pal village is 915 which is lower than average sex ratio of India 940. Literacy rate of the village was 72.27%, which is lower compared to 82.34% literacy rate of Maharashtra. Male literacy is 79.77% while female literacy rate is 64.03%. 50.46% population of the village is Schedule Tribe (ST) while Schedule Caste (SC) were 1.62% of total population. There were 3081 working people in the village. 358 people were cultivators while 1766 people were agricultural labourers.
