= Bhoje, Maharashtra =

Village in Maharashtra, India

Bhoje is a village in the Jalgaon District, Maharashtra, India. According to the 2011 census of India, the village had a population of 2,417 people (1,238 males; 1,179 females).
