= Thombre =

Thombre (also spelled as Thombare), is a surname native to Indian state of Maharashtra. Notable people with the surname include:

- Trimbak Bapuji Thombre (1890–1918), Marathi poet
- Prarthana Thombare (born 1994), Indian tennis player
