= Nhavi =

Village in Maharashtra

- Village
- Location in Maharashtra, India Nhavi (India)
- Coordinates: 21.17°N 75.85°E
- Country: India
- State: Maharashtra
- District: Jalgaon

Languages
  - Official: Marathi
- Time zone: UTC+5:30 (IST)

Nhavi is a caste village in Yawal taluka in Jalgaon district in the state of Maharashtra, India.

== Demographics ==
The residents of Nhavi are mostly from the Muslims, Koli, Tadvi bhil, Buddhists, Parashi and Pawra. The community is prevalent in the area of Nhavi. Nhavi is covered with 8 temples, viz Vithhal, Swaminarayan, Durga Devi, Manu Devi, Khanderav, Lord Ram, Lord Shiva & Hanumaan (Raj Rajeshwar Mahadev Mandir) and so on. Holi festival is the specialty of Nhavi and is famous for God Khanderav.

According to the census conducted in 2011, by the Ministry of Home Affairs, the total population reported was 12,782 and 3,143 Households. It shows 6,549 males and 6,233 female population out of which 1,442 are under the age of 6 years. The literacy level noted in the survey was near 95 percent. Pincode of Nhavi village is 425524.

== Village prestigious Members ==
- Jivram Tukaram Mahajn
- Shripat Vishanu Chopade
- Vishanu Vithu Borole
- Devendra Bhanudas Chopade - Current Sarpancha.

etc.....

== Education ==
There are 9 major academic institutes in Nhavi:

- Bharat Vidyalaya Nhavi
- Shetki Basic Shala Nhavi
- Marathi Mulinchi Shala Nhavi
- G P Madhyamik Nhavi
- Sharada Vidyalaya Nhavi
- Urdu anglu High school Nhavi
- J T Mahajan Primary School Nhavi
- J T Mahajan Polytechnic College Nhavi
- J T Mahajan College of Engineering Nhavi
- J T Mahajan Industrial Training Institute Nhavi
- J T Mahajan College of M E
- Dr. Khachane Nursing College

J. T. Mahajan College of Engineering is one of the "A" grade educational institute in the Nhavi area. It caters all the hardworking students across the country.

== Industry ==
The main livelihood of the residents is farming, with bananas as the prevalent crop. Madhukar Sahakari Sakhar Karkhana (Sugar Factory) is situated near village and most of the people work there. The main market is Weekly market that opens on Monday 2.00 pm to 6.00 pm where farmers sell vegetables to the villagers. People from neighboring villages like Marul, Talegaon, Kalmoda, Hambardi, Borkheda also buy & sell in this weekly market.

== Media ==
Majority of local newspapers are published from Jalgaon, namely Deshdoot, Deshonnati, Lokmat etc.
