= Trimbak Bapuji Thombre =

Indian Marathi poet (1890–1918)

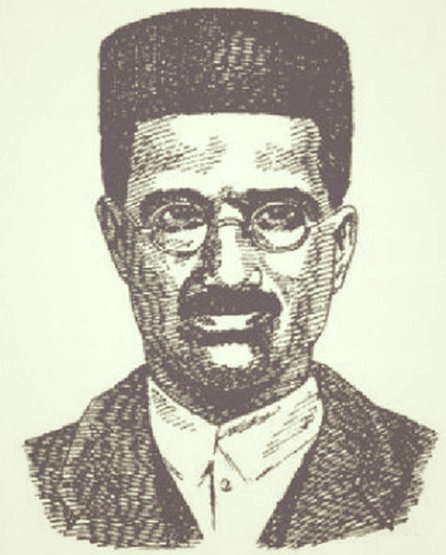
- Born: 13 August 1890; Patonda, Khandesh district, Bombay Presidency, India
- Died: 5 May 1918 (aged 27); Bhadli Railway Station, Jalgaon district
- Other name: Balkavi (pen name)
- Known for: Poems in Marathi language
- Spouse: Parvati Bai

Trimbak Bapuji Thombre (IAST:Trimbak Bāpūji Thombare; 13 August 1890 – 5 May 1918), (known popularly as Balkavi or Balkavi Thombre), was a Marathi language poet from Jalgaon district of Maharashtra, India.

== Biography ==
Balkavi was born on 13 August 1889 in a Marathi Deshastha Brahmin family to Bapurao Devaram Thombre and Godatai in patonda near Dharangaon village in Khandesh district of Bombay Presidency in British India. His father was employed in police department. Due to frequent shuffling of postings of his father his education suffered a lot. Balkavi had an elder sister and also had an older and younger brother. Due to his father's job he spent his childhood in Jamner, Yawal, Betawad, Erandol towns of Jalgaon district. Till he went in fourth class he was not involved in poetry writing, in the fourth class he first time read the poems of Sridhar Mahipat.

When Balkavi was 14 years old he traveled Kashmir, Aagra and Mathura with poet R. Vaidya. Balkavi's first ever poem was published at Erandol's Dasha kal weekly magazine, title as Mulans upadesh. When he was 17 he presented his poem in front of large audience at first ever poetic assembly of Maharashtra at Jalgaon. At this very gathering Kanhoba Ranchoddas Kirtikar bestowed him by Balkavi title.

He spent a period of his childhood with writer and poet Narayan Tilak, a Marathi poet from the Konkan region of the Bombay Presidency in British Raj and a convert to Christianity. Narayan Tilak identified the talent within Tryambak and brought him to his home. Laxmibai Tilak had a motherly relationship with Balkavi. She mentioned some of her memories of Balkavi in her autobiography 'Smruti Chitre'.

== Notable work ==
औदुंबर
Recording of one of Balkavi's poem.

Balkavi's poems are marked by exuberant language. Notable works include:

- Phulrani (Marathi: फुलराणी)
- Audumber (Marathi: औदुंबर)
- Shraavan-Maasii Harshh Maanasii (Marathi: श्रावण मासी हर्ष मानसी)
- Anandi anand Gade, jikade tikade chohikade (Marathi: आनंदी आनंद गड़े जिकडे तिकडे चौहीकडे)

== Legacy ==
Balkavi's poems were incorporated in Balbharati school text books.
