= Khandeshi people =

Indo-Aryan ethnolinguistic group

Khandeshi
खान्देशी

Total population
- 1.86 million

Regions with significant populations
- India

Languages
- Khandeshi, Marathi

Religion
- Hinduism, Islam

Related ethnic groups
- other Indo-Aryan peoples

The Khandeshi people, also known as Qhandeshi, are an ethnolinguistic group and the inhabitants of the historical region of Khandesh in northwestern Maharashtra, India. The region today broadly comprises the districts of Dhule, Nandurbar and Jalgaon. Historically a frontier zone between northern and Deccan polities, Khandesh developed a distinct linguistic and cultural identity centered on the Ahirani (Khandeshi) dialect and a blend of Marathi and tribal traditions.

== Etymology ==
The name Khandesh is commonly derived from the Persian words khan (ruler) and desh (land), meaning "land of the khans." The term became associated with the Faruqi rulers who governed the region from the fourteenth century.

== History ==
Khandesh emerged as a politically distinct region in the late medieval period under the Faruqi dynasty, founded in 1370 by Malik Raja Faruqi. The Faruqis ruled an independent sultanate centered in the Tapti River valley until the Mughal annexation in 1601 under Emperor Akbar.

Under Mughal rule Khandesh became a provincial administrative unit. It later passed to the Marathas and eventually to the British East India Company following the surrender of the Peshwa in 1818.

During the colonial period the old Khandesh district was administratively divided, and after Indian independence the region was reorganized into modern districts. Nandurbar district was carved out of Dhule in 1998.

== Geography and Demographics ==
Khandesh lies between the Satpura and Satmala ranges in northwestern Maharashtra and forms a transitional zone between the Deccan plateau and central India.

According to the 2011 Census, the combined population of Dhule, Jalgaon, and Nandurbar exceeds eight million. Hindus constitute the majority religious group across the region, followed by Muslims and smaller communities of Buddhists, Jains, Christians, and Sikhs. Nandurbar district has a particularly high proportion of Scheduled Tribe population, with tribal communities forming over two-thirds of residents.

== Language ==
The principal regional speech form is Ahirani (also called Khandeshi), an Indo-Aryan dialect historically associated with the Ahir community. Census data show significant numbers of Ahirani speakers in Dhule and Jalgaon districts, alongside Marathi, which functions as a regional lingua franca. Other languages include Bhili dialects and Pawari, reflecting the strong tribal presence in the region.

== Society and Culture ==
Khandeshi culture represents a synthesis of agrarian Marathi and tribal lifeways. Folk music, seasonal fairs, and mask dances are central to community life. One notable celebration is the tribal festival Bhongarya, observed around Holi, featuring communal dancing, drumming and courtship rituals.

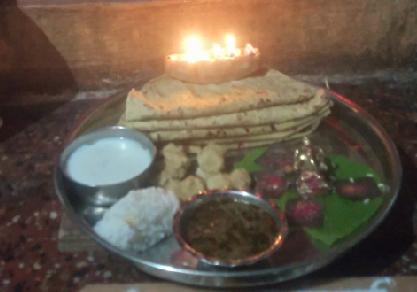
Khandeshi Cuisine

Cuisine reflects the semi-arid climate. Staple foods include jowar bhakri (sorghum flatbread), thecha (chili-garlic chutney), and thick lentil preparations.

== Notable people ==
- Pratibha Devisingh Patil – 12th President of India (2007–2012), born in Jalgaon district.
