= Mooljee Jetha College, Jalgaon =

College in Jalgaon, Maharashtra, India

Moolji Jetha College, also spelt as "Moolji Jaitha College" (MJC), is a college in Jalgaon, Maharashtra. It was established in 1945 and is one of the oldest Colleges in the northern Maharashtra region.

It is now affiliated to North Maharashtra University, but was earlier under Savitribai Phule Pune University. Run by Khandesh College Education Society, the college offers undergraduate and postgraduate programs in traditional and professional courses.

== Notable alumni ==
- Pratibha Patil, 12th President of India
- Namdeo Dhondo Mahanor, Renowned Marathi Poet and Recipient of Sahitya Academy Award and Padma Award Winner 2010
- Ujjwal Nikam, Public Prosecutor
- Suresh Jain, Politician & Ex Minister in Maharashtra Legislative Assembly
- Haribhau Jawale, Ex Member of Parliament
- Ashok Jain, Vice Chairman, Jain Group of Industries
