= Anjale =

- town
- Location in Maharashtra, India
- Coordinates: 21°5′44.85″N 75°45′7.84″E
- Country: India
- State: Maharashtra
- District: Jalgaon

Languages
  - Official: Marathi
- Time zone: UTC+5:30 (IST)
- PIN: 425304
- Nearest city: Bhusawal
- Lok Sabha constituency: Raver
- Vidhan Sabha constituency: Raver
- Climate: MH- (Köppen)

Anjale is a village in Jalgaon district, Maharashtra, India. It is situated 8 km from Bhusawal.
