= Government Polytechnic Jalgaon =

- शासकिय तंत्रनिकेतन जळगांव
- Interactive map of Government Polytechnic Jalgaon
- Coordinates: 21.0034102°N 75.55132400000002°E
- Country: India
- State: Maharashtra
- Region: Khandesh
- District: Jalgaon
- Established: 1960
- Website: www.gpjalgaon.org.in

Government Polytechnic Jalgaon is a polytechnic college established in 1960 in India. Spread over a land of 52 acres, its infrastructure facilities were enhanced and equipment procured under a World Bank Assisted Project implemented during 1992-97.

The college started with one branch of civil engineering. Today, it has seven branches including information technology; computer, electrical, civil and mechanical engineering; electronics and telecommunications, and pharmacy.

The institute is governed by the government of Maharashtra and approved by the All India Council for Technical Education and the Pharmacy Council of India, to offer technical level diplomas and post diploma programmes in engineering, technology and pharmacy.

== Facilities ==
Below is list of facilities provided by institute.

- Boys hostel with capacity of 180, Girls hostel with capacity of 56, trainees hostel .
- Library with about 40,537 books, 31 journals.
- Computer Centre with 75 P-IV based computers.
- Student's Co-Operative stores.
- Canteen and Mess building.

== Branches ==
Government Polytechnic Jalgaon offers diploma in below

- Civil Engineering
- Computer Engineering
- Electrical engineering
- Electronics and Telecommunications engineering
- IT engineering
- Mechanical Engineering
- Pharmacy
