= Asoda =

Village in Maharashtra, India

Asoda is a village in Jalgaon District, Maharashtra state in western India, located on the northern Deccan Plateau. It is 5 kilometres (3.1 mi) from Jalgaon, located within the irrigated agricultural region of Khandesh. The main occupation of people in Asoda is farming of cotton, black gram, green gram.

== Geography ==
Its geographical coordinates are 21° 2' 0" North, 75° 36' 0" East. Asoda is surrounded by Jalgaon, Bhadli, Mamurabad and Tarsod.

== Demographics ==
As of 2001 Indian census, Asoda has a population of 10,000. Males constitute 52% of the population and females 48%.

== Transport ==
Most people depend on public transport MSRTC, commonly known as "ST", and private vehicles like auto-rickshaw for commuting to district and taluka places like Jalgaon & Bhusawal.
