= Sonvad =

Village in Maharashtra

Coordinates: 21°05′N 75°21′E

Sonwad is a village of Panchayat system in Dharangaon tehsil Jalgaon district in the state of Maharashtra, India.
