= Faizpur =

- Town
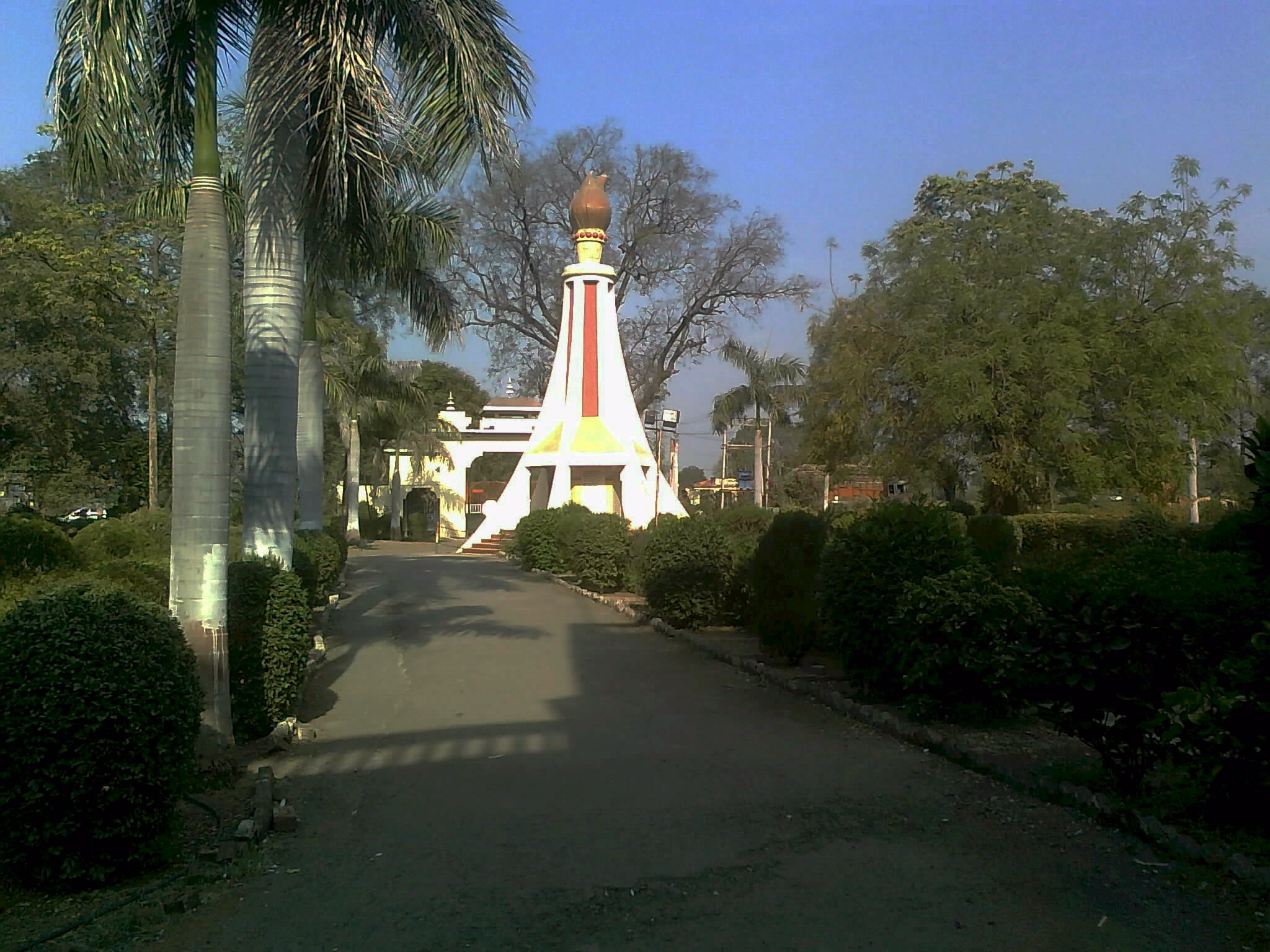
- Prerna Stambh (inspiration tower) in Dhanaji Nana Mahavidyalaya, Faizpur, which was inaugurated by former prime minister Rajiv Gandhi in March 1988.

- Location in Maharashtra, India
- Coordinates: 21.17°N 75.85°E
- Country: India
- State: Maharashtra
- District: Jalgaon
- Elevation: 226 m (741 ft)

Population (2011)
  - Total: 26,602

Languages
  - Official: Marathi
- Time zone: UTC+5:30 (IST)
- PIN: 425503
- Telephone code: 02585
- Vehicle registration: MH-19

Faizpur is a town in Tahasil of Yawal in Jalgaon district of Maharashtra, India.

== Geography ==
Faizpur is located at 21.17°N 75.85°E. It has an average elevation of 226 metres (741 feet).

== Transport ==
Road

Faizpur is well connected by road network. Maharashtra state highway No. 4 runs through the city.

Rail

Faizpur itself does not connected with railway network. Nearest railway station is Savda railway station (9 km). And nearest railway Junction is Bhusawal junction railway station (19 km).

Air

Nearest airports are,

Domestic: Jalgaon airport (45 km).

International: Devi Ahilyabai Holkar airport, Indore (230 km).

== Demographics ==
Religion in City (2011)
1. Hinduism (55.2%)
2. Islam (41.6%)
3. Christianity (0.06%)
4. Sikhism (0.11%)
5. Buddhism (2.53%)
6. Jainism (0.36%)
7. Other Religions (0.04%)
8. Atheist (0.13%)

As of 2011 India census, Faizpur had a population of 26,602. Males constitute 52% of the population and females 48%. Out of which 13% of the population is under 6 years of age.

Year	Male	Female	Total Population	Change	Religion (%)							
Year	Male	Female	Total Population	Change	Hindu	Muslim	Christian	Sikhs	Buddhist	Jain	Other religions and persuasions	Religion not stated
2001	12310	11384	23694	-	59.956	35.992	0.042	0.059	2.431	0.388	1.004	0.127
2011	13673	12929	26602	0.123	55.173	41.572	0.068	0.117	2.526	0.361	0.045	0.139

Faizpur has an average literacy rate of 85.96%, higher than the national average of 74.04. Male literacy is 89.45%, and female literacy is 82.28%.

== Politics ==
The Fiftieth (50th) Session of the Indian National Congress was held on 27 and 28 December 1936 at Faizpur, a village on the outskirts of Yawal Taluka of Jalgaon District of Bombay Presidency (Maharashtra). It was, here, for the first time that Congress held its Annual Session in a backward rural setting. A large number of peasants participated in the session. The Faizpur Session was important for the Congress which had been raising demands for the welfare of the peasants and struggled for them. The Faizpur Session was also important because it was presided over by Jawaharlal Nehru who was at his peak of influence in the Congress and Rajmal Lalwani was the treasurer for that conference.

Faizpur Municipal Corporation was established in 1889.

List of presidents of corporation

1. Khushal Hari Chaudhari (31/03/1906 to 31/03/1935)
2. Totaram Badhu Mahajan (01/04/1936 to 31/03/1939)
3. Hiraman Lakshiman Saraf (29/08/1942 to 20/01/1949)
4. Baliram Bapu Waghulde (20/01/1949 to 20/04/1952) & (31/12/1957 to 31/05/1961) 1st president. Directly elected by people.
5. Natu Devram Mahajan (21/04/1952 to 16/02/1957)
6. Lalu Sona Chaudhari (31/05/1961 to 31/07/1967)
7. Asaram Hari Bharambe (01/08/1967 to 1971)
8. Shankar Baliram Waghulde (17/12/1974 to 05/02/1981) Directly elected by people.
9. Choldas Bomtu Patil (15/05/1985 to 17/12/1991)
10. Bhaskar Kashiram Chaudhari (18/12/1991 to 02/08/1994)
11. Pramod Kashinath Chaudhari(12/09/1994 to 17/12/1996)
12. Pandurang Dagadu Saraf (18/12/1996 to 17/12/1997)
13. Milind Shankar Waghulde(18/12/1997 to 17/12/1998) & (26/12/2006 to 25/06/2009)Directly elected by people
14. Malati Pralhad Saraf(18/12/1998 to 17/12/2001) 1st female president of corporation.
15. Ashalata Pramod Chaudhari (18/12/2001 to 21/12/2006)Directly Elected by people.
16. Nilesh Muralidhar Rane (26/12/2009 to 25/12/2011& 22/07/2014 to 25/01/2016)
17. Amita Hemraj Chaudhari (26/12/2011 to 27/07/2014 & 10/02/2016 to 25/12/2016)
18. Shahnaz Bi Shaikh Yusuf (25/01/2016 to 09/02/2016)
19. Mahanda Ravindra Tekam-Hole (26/12/2016 to ) Directly elected by people.

== Education ==
Faizpur has many schools, colleges, private institutions & coaching classes. Lots of students from surrounding villages also come here for educational purposes. Because of that, Faizpur emerged as education hub of this area.

=== Schools ===
- Municipal High School, Faizpur
- Kusumtai Madhukarrao Chaudhari Vidyalaya, Faizpur
- Shakuntala Jivram Mahajan Madhyamik Vidyalaya, Faizpur
- Moulana Abul kalam aazad highschool
- Fatema Girls Highschool millat nagar
- P.Y.Chaudhari Primary School, Faizpur
- Shanti Vidya Mandir, Faizpur
- Childhood Play School, Faizpur
- Dr. Ulhas Patil English Medium School, Savda Road, Faizpur
- J. T. Mahajan English Medium School, Yawal Road, Faizpur
- Wisdom English Medium School
- BAJME ADAB URDU SCH FAIZPUR School
- Zillah Parishad Urdu Boys School No. 1, 2 & 3
- Zillah Parishad Urdu Girls School No. 1 & 2

=== Colleges ===
- TVES'S Dhanaji Nana Mahavidyalaya, Faizpur
- TVES'S Honorable Loksevak Madhukarrao Chaudhari College of Pharmacy, Faizpur
- J. T. Mahajan College of Engineering, Nhavi Marg, Faizpur
- Shri Chakradhar Gurukul Sanskrit Mahavidyalaya, Faizpur

== Tourist places ==
- Pal Hill station (35 km)
- Manudevi Mandir (30 km)
- Changdev Maharaj Mandir (25.2 km)
- Jawaharlal Nehru Udyan, Near Bus Stand, Faizpur (0.5 km)

== Notable people ==
Bal Sitaram Mardhekar - A Marathi writer who brought about a radical shift of sensibility in Marathi poetry.
