= Yawal =

Town in Maharashtra, India

- city
- Location in Maharashtra, India
- Coordinates: 21.1667°N 75.7°E
- Country: India
- State: Maharashtra
- District: Jalgaon

Population (2011)
  - Total: 36,706

Languages
  - Official: Marathi
- Time zone: UTC+5:30 (IST)
- PIN: 425301
- Telephone code: 02585
- Vehicle registration: MH-19

Yawal is a taluka, city and a municipal council in Jalgaon, Maharashtra, India.

== Geography ==
Yawal has 1 river Sur river with 2 tributaries, (Harita and Sarita a.k.a. Hadkai and Khadkai). In the stream of Suki River Suresh Chopane, Geologist from Chandrapur discovered Columnar Basalt in August 2021.This is a rare Geological formation. Yawal taluka consists of Atrawal, Kingaon, Anjale, Amoda, Sakali, Faizpur, Sangavi Bk, Nhavi, Korpawali, Haripura, Viravali and many other villages.

== Demographics ==
Yawal have a Hindu Population of 68.28%, Muslim population of 26.19%, Buddhist population of 3.89%, and other religions are 1.64% as of May 2022.

Year	Male	Female	Total Population	Change	Religion (%)							
Year	Male	Female	Total Population	Change	Hindu	Muslim	Christian	Sikhs	Buddhist	Jain	Other religions and persuasions	Religion not stated
2001	128272	120324	248596	-	72.852	21.362	0.064	0.027	3.539	0.177	1.034	0.945
2011	139981	132261	272242	0.095	70.236	24.237	0.061	0.028	2.283	0.150	0.545	2.460

View source data.
View source data.

== Politics ==
Yawal is also a taluka city in the district of Jalgaon, Maharashtra. The Yawal city is divided into 19 wards for which elections are held every 5 years. The Yawal Municipal Council has a population of 36,706 of which 18,965 are males while 17,741 are females as per report released by Census India 2011. Yawal Municipal Council has total administration over 7,363 houses to which it supplies basic amenities like water and sewerage.

== Transport ==
Yawal is located on the Burhanpur-Ankaleshwer MH SH 4. The nearest main railway station is Bhusawal which is just 18 km. The nearest airport to Yawal is Jalgaon Airport which is just 45 km away.

== Temples ==
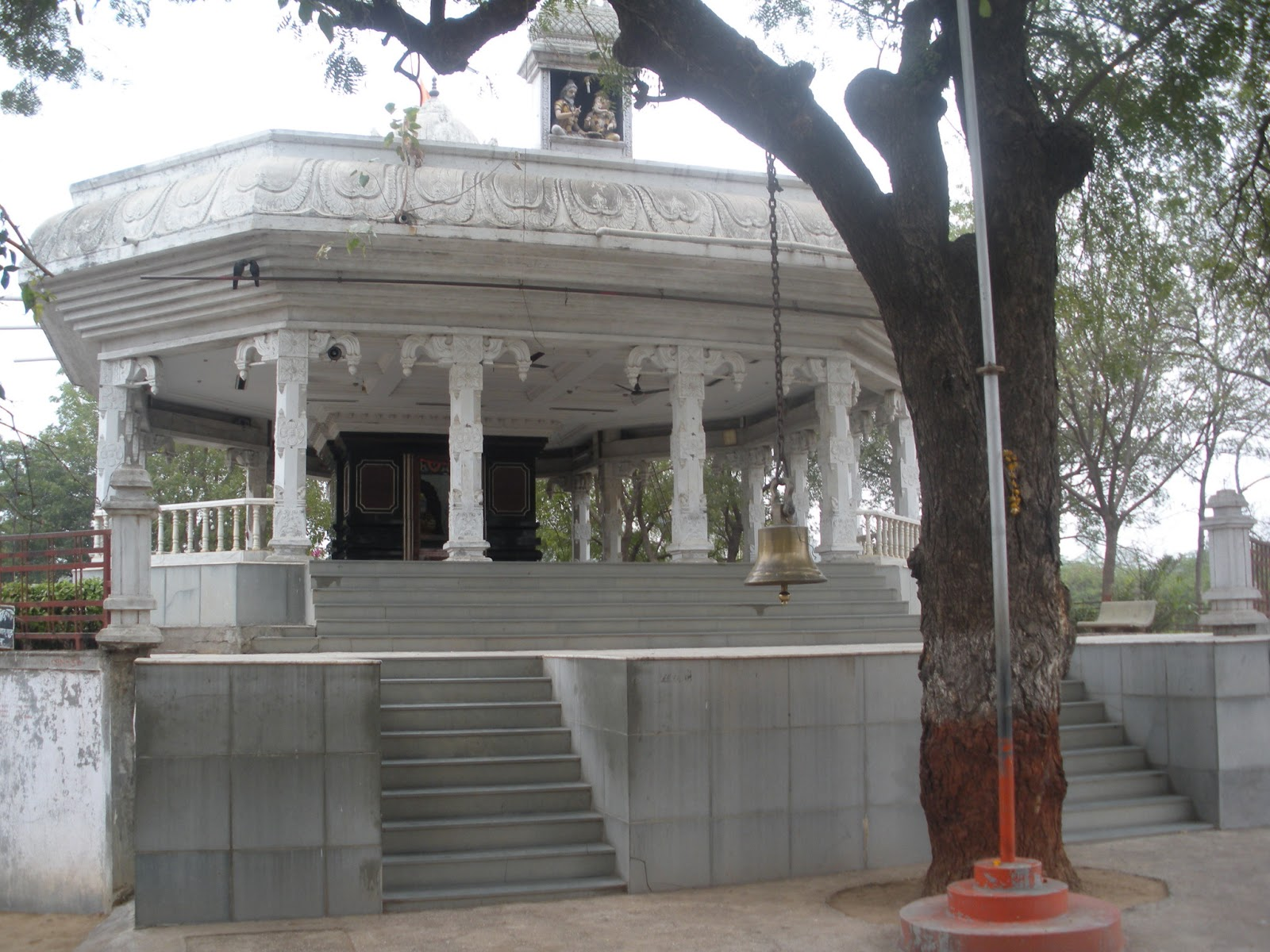
Maharishi Vyas Mandir

- Shree Jagatguru Ved Maharshi Vyas Muni Mandir. He wrote the Mahabharata.
- Tarkeshwar Mandir.

It has a fort said to have belonged to the Sansthanik Raje Nimbalkar. Gavali Wadaa has a 9–10 km long wall.

== Yawal Taluka(Tehsil) ==
Yawal is a city with tehsil headquarter in Jalgaon district of Maharashtra state in India. In Yawal taluka there is 91 villages and 2 towns(Yawal & Faizpur).

According to Indian census of 2011, population of Yawal taluka was 2,72,242. In which, 23.3% people lives in Urban areas and 76.7% lives in the Rural areas.

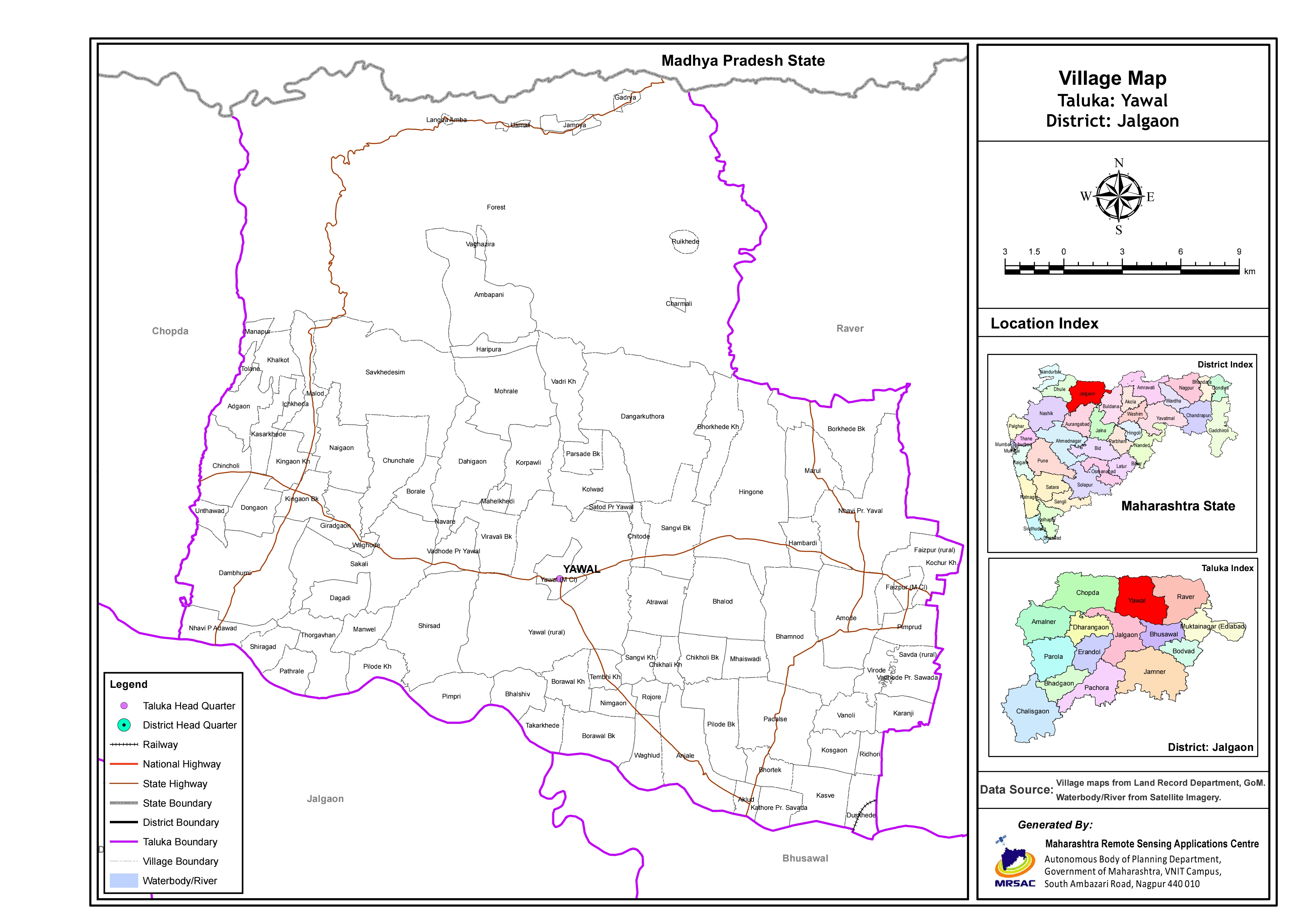
Map of Yawal taluka

== See also ==
- Jalgaon
- Raver
- Yawal Fort
