= Dhanore =

Village in Maharashtra

Dhanore is a village in Barshi taluka, Solapur district, Maharashtra state, India. It is also known as Dagad Dhanore. It is 13 km away from Barshi, located on Barshi-Yermala Road. The local language is Marathi. And the Pin code is 413401.
