= Mhasawad, Jalgaon district =

Village in Maharashtra

Mhasawad
- Village
- Location in Maharashtra, India
- Coordinates: 20.87°N 75.45°E
- Country: India
- State: Maharashtra
- District: Jalgaon

Area
  - Total: 6.10 km^{2} (2.36 sq mi)
- Elevation: 217 m (712 ft)

Population (2011)
  - Total: 8,424
  - Density: 1,380/km^{2} (3,580/sq mi)

Languages
  - Official: Marathi ahirani
- Time zone: UTC+5:30 (IST)

Mhasawad is a village in Jalgaon district of the Indian state of Maharashtra.
