= Chopda =

City in Maharashtra, India

- City/Tehsil
- Location in india
- Coordinates: 21.25°N 75.3°E
- Country: India
- State: Maharashtra
- District: Jalgaon
- Elevation: 190 m (620 ft)

Population (2011)
  - Total: 72,783

Languages
  - Official: Marathi, Ahirani
- Time zone: UTC+5:30 (IST)
- Postal code: 425107

Chopda or Chopra is a city and municipal council in the Jalgaon district in the state of Maharashtra, India.

Chopda is a town and one of the Tehsils constituting 119 villages in the Jalgaon district in Maharashtra, India. It is located at 21.25°N 75.18°E and has an average elevation of 190 meters (623.36 feet). The town is situated on the banks of the Ratnavati River and is linked by roads to the rest of the Jalgaon district, which also borders with Districts like Dhule (Maharashtra), Khargone and Barwani in Madhya Pradesh. The Tapi, one of the major rivers in India, is approximately 10 km away from Chopda.

Popular events to experience in Chopda are Rath Yatra, Shravan Somvar Jatra, and Ganpati Visarjan.

== Notable politicians ==
=== Members of Legislative Assembly ===
- Sharchchandrika Suresh Patil (Indian National Congress) 1981–1982
- Arun Gujarathi (Samajwadi Congress) 1985–1990
- Arunbhai Gujrathi (INC) 1989-1994
- Arunbhai Gujarathi (INC) 1994–1999
- Arun Gujarathi (NCP) 1999–2004 (Speaker of Maharashtra Legislative Assembly)
- Kailas gorakh patil (Shiv Sena) 2004-2009
- Jagdish Valvi (NCP) 2009–2014
- Chandrakant Baliram Sonawane (Shiv Sena) 2014-2019
- Latabai Sonawane (Shiv Sena) 2019-Current

=== Members of Parliament ===
- Sonusing Dhansing Patil (BLD)
- Vijay Naval Patil (INC(I)) 1980–1984
- Vijay Naval Patil (INC) 1984–1989
- Uttam Laxmanrao Patil (BJP) 1989–1991
- Vijay Naval Patil (INC) 1991–1996
- Annasaheb M.K. Patil (BJP) 1996–1998
- Annasaheb M.K. Patil (BJP) 1998–1999
- Annasaheb M.K. Patil (BJP) 1999–2003
- Annasaheb M.K. Patil (BJP) 2003–2007
- Vasantaray Jeevanarav More (National Congress Party) 2007–2009
- Haribhau Javle (BJP) 2009–2014
- Rakshatai Khadse (BJP) 2014-current

== Demographics ==
Chopda has a population of 271,863 people. Males constitute 52 percent of the population and females 48 percent. The average literacy rate is 67 percent, higher than the national average of 59.5 percent, with male literacy at 74 percent and female literacy at 59 percent. Approximately 13 percent of the population is less than six years old.

| Year | Male | Female | Total Population | Change | Religion (%) | | | | | | | |
| Year | Male | Female | Total Population | Change | Hindu | Muslim | Christian | Sikhs | Buddhist | Jain | Other religions and persuasions | Religion not stated |
|---|---|---|---|---|---|---|---|---|---|---|---|---|
| 2001 | 139587 | 132276 | 271863 | - | 86.281 | 10.374 | 0.124 | 0.040 | 1.989 | 0.662 | 0.207 | 0.323 |
| 2011 | 161577 | 151238 | 312815 | 0.151 | 85.700 | 10.981 | 0.161 | 0.034 | 2.103 | 0.566 | 0.283 | 0.173 |

View chart definition.
View chart definition.

The main languages and dialects spoken are Ahirani, Gujari, Marathi, Hindi, Urdu and English.

== Economy ==
Chopda has an agricultural economy. Major crops include sugar cane, cotton, bananas, pulses, and poultry. Chopda is also home to several industrial projects, including the Chahardi sugar factory, SutGirani, and several cotton ginning and pressing factories. Other businesses like gold and cloth markets can be found on MG Road. Chopda also has several educational institutions and serves as a regional transportation center.

== Transportation ==
Chopda is connected by roads to neighboring cities such as Jalgaon (60 km), Amalner (36 km), Yawal (45 km), Shirpur (45 km). State Highway No.4, Burhanpur-Ankleshwar, goes through Chopda. Railway stations are in the neighbouring cities of Dharangaon, Amalner, Jalgaon, and Bhusawal. The closest airport is at Jalgaon.

== Education ==
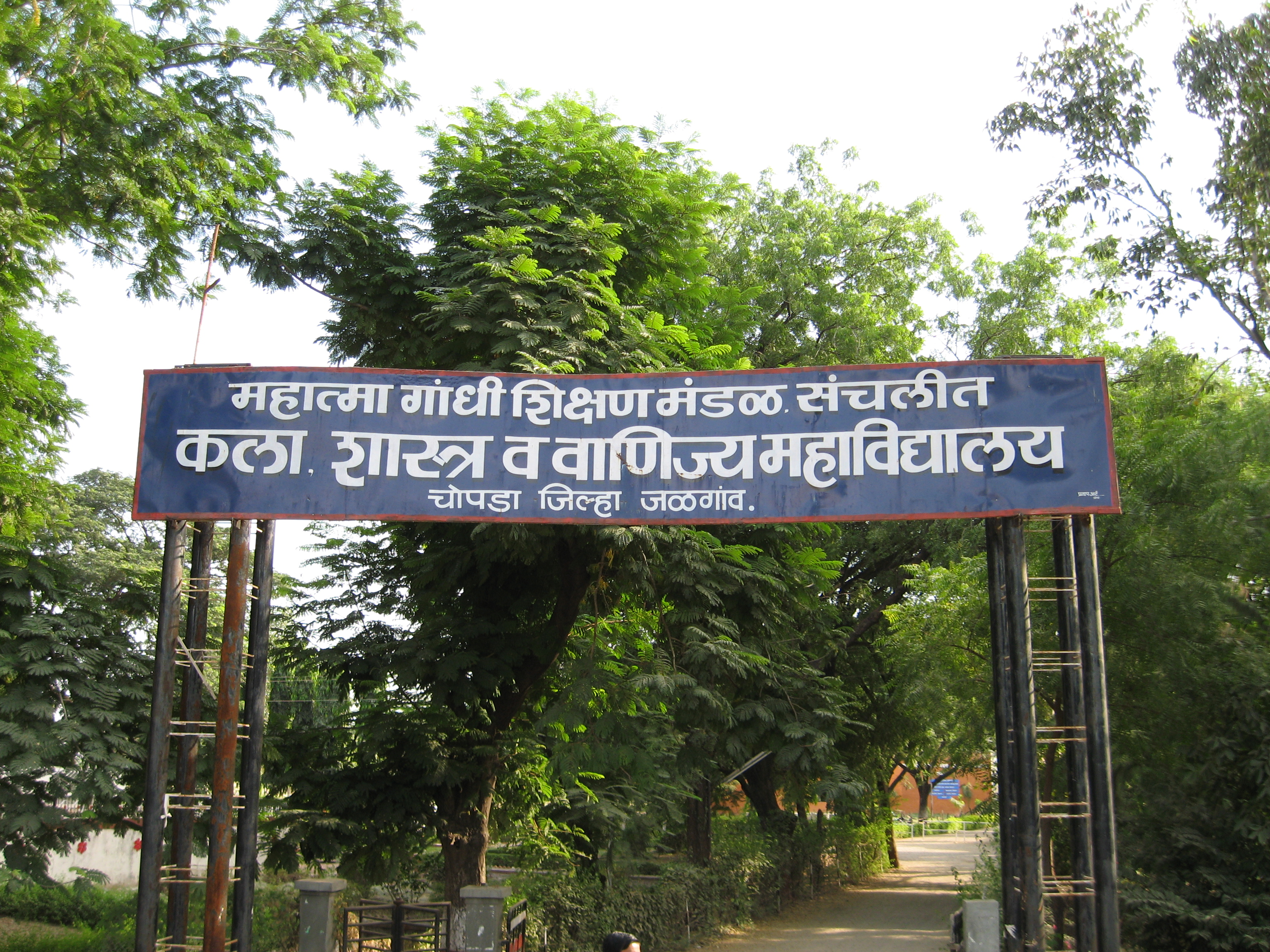
Dadasaheb Dr. suresh G. Patil College, Chopda

Mahatma Gandhi Shikshan Mandal include Dadasaheb Dr. Suresh G. Patil College, Polytechnic College, Education College, Pharmacy College, CBSE Affiliated Oxford English Medium School Chopda schools include Pratap Vidya Mandir, Balmohan Vidyalay, Pankaj Primary School, Kasturba, Clara School, Mahila Mandal Madhyamik Vidyalaya, Vivekananda Vidyalaya, (CBSE affiliated) Vivekananda English Medium School, Pankaj Global School, Madhyamik Kanya Vidyalaya, College include Arts, Science and Commerce College, Chopda, College of Pharmacy, Smt. S.S.Patil Polytechnic, Pankaj Mahavidyalaya, and PVM B.Ed. College Mustafa Anglo Urdu High School. Pratap Vidya Mandir High School recently marked its centenary of establishment on 9 January 2018. Various other academic institutes and private coaching classes are run in the city. Institutes like Amar Sanstha provide coaching in various fields.

- 1*. Mahatma Gandhi Shikshak Prasarak Mandal.

== Tourism ==
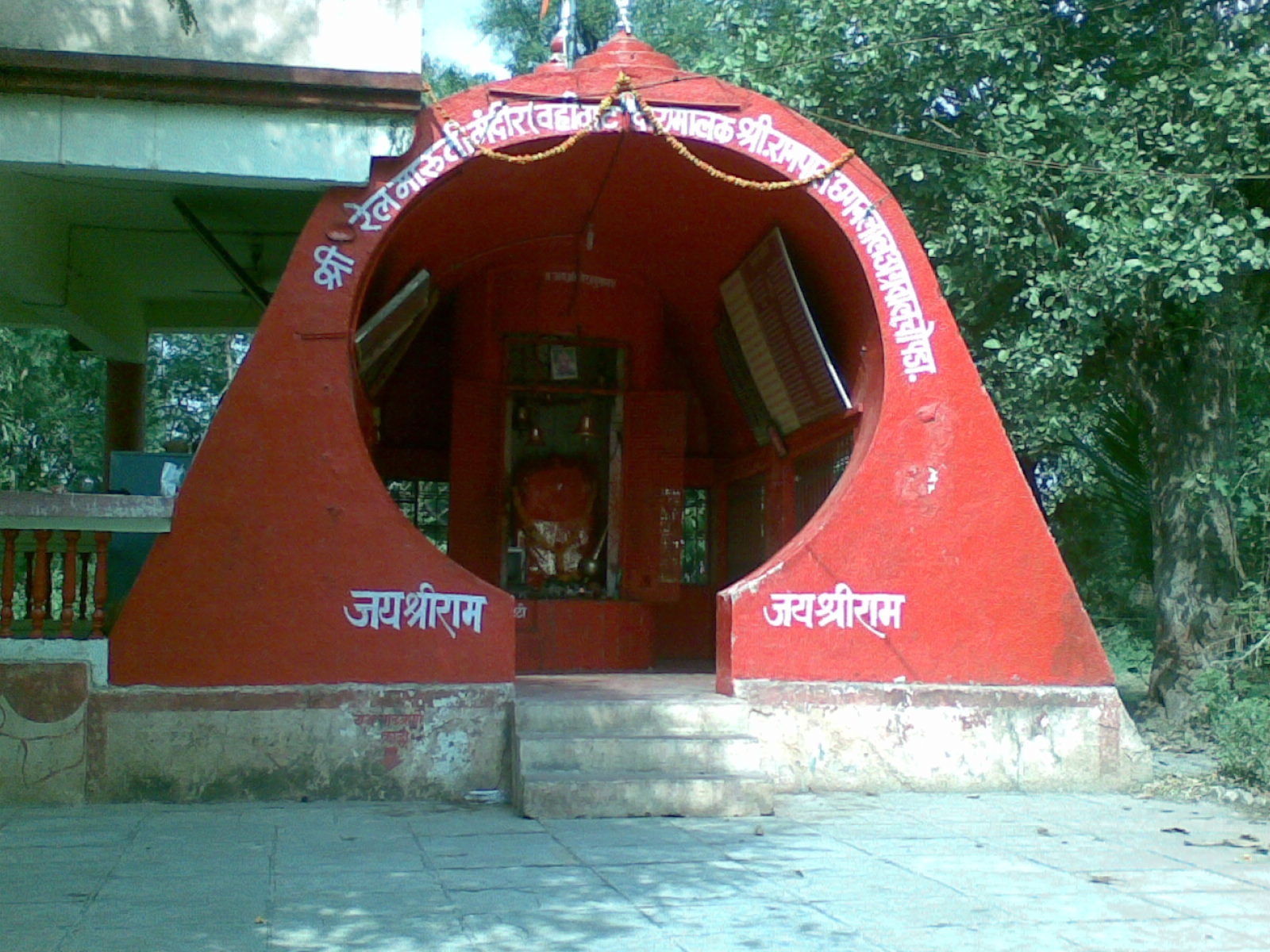
Rail Maruti Mandir, near Vele, Chopda

Local tourist sites include the hot springs at Unapdev. According to local mythology, an arrow shot by Lord Rama formed the hot springs; it is therefore considered a holy place and said to cure skin diseases. There are picnic spots around Unapdev. Other attractions include Chaugaon fort (or Gavali fort) near Lasur, Nageshwar temple, scenic hills in Satpuda, and the river Tapti. Rel Maruti Mandir is a temple dedicated to Lord Hanuman, 8 km from Chopda on the route to Dharangaon. Aner Dam, 20 km from the city, is an old dam on the river Aner. There is also a temple of Sri Sant Shravan Baba On the banks of river Tapi at Vitner, 35 km from Chopda.Unapdev is just 3 kilometers away from Vardi, and the pleasure of seeing the Satpura Mountains from Vardi onwards is something else, and if you get the time, you can definitely experience it.And Vardi village is famous throughout the district for the Bhandara of Shri Samarth Suknath Baba. Suknath Baba's Bhandara is celebrated on the second day of Holi in the month of March. Famous shitalnath baba mandir also situated in Chopda city and Khachane village.

== Municipal council ==
Presidents of the Municipal council

| Name of Councilors | From Date | To Date |
|---|---|---|
| Shri. Aanandrao Shripatrao Deshmukh | 1918 | 31 December, 1928 |
| Shri. Maganlal Nagindas Gujrathi | 1 January 1929 | 9 June 1941 |
| Shri. Fakirchand Jankiram Agrawal | 10 June 1941 | 6 October 1944 |
| Shri. Maganlal Nagindas Gujrathi | 7 October 1944 | 9 October 1946 |
| Shri. Dattatrya Balvant Tillu | 10 October 1946 | 13 October 1947 |
| Shri. Maganlal Nagindas Gujrathi | 14 October 1947 | 1960 |
| Shri. Raghunath Sandu Patil | 1960–1961 | 1963–1964 |
| Shri. Ranchoddas Nagindas Gujrathi | 1964-65 | 1 July 1967 |
| Shri. Sitaram Narayan Agrawal | 2 July 1967 | 29 July 1971 |
| Shri. Ranchoddas Nagindas Gujrathi | 30 July 1971 | 3 July 1975 |
| Shri. Arunlal Goverdhandas Gujarathi | 4 July 1975 | 5 February 1981 |
| Administrator | 6 February 1981 | 30 April 1985 |
| Dr.Sau.Susheelaben Shah | 21 May 1985 | 16 December 1991 |
| Shri. Ramanlal Babulal Gujarathi | 17 December 1991 | 17 December 1996 |
| Dr.Sau.Susheelaben Shah | 18 December 1996 | 16 December 2001 |
| Sau. Malubai Digamber Patil | 18 December 2001 | 22 December 2006 |
| Sau. Tarabai Diliprao Patil | 26 December 2006 | 26 October 2007 |
| Dr. Jaya Diliprao Patil | 27 October 2007 | 9 June 2009 |
| Sau. Kalpana Vilas Jagtap | 10 June 2009 | 26 October 2011 |
| Shri. Adv. Sandeep Suresh Patil | 26 December 2011 | 30 June 2014 |
| Sumeshan Naidoo | 1 July 2014 | Present |
| Sau. Manisha Jivan Chaudhari (Lok Niyukta) | 26 December 2016 | today |
