= Balbharati =

State agency in Maharashtra, India

- The Maharashtra State Bureau of Textbook Production and Curriculum Research
- Type: Government institution
- Established: 27 January 1967; 59 years ago
- Location: Pune, Maharashtra, India; 18.5177°N 73.8148°E
- Website: ebalbharati.in

Balbharati is a textbook production company which primarily handles the manufacturing and distribution of school textbooks for students from standard I to standard XII for the state of Maharashtra. It also publishes teacher’s handbooks, self-study booklets and other educational material. It is located in Pune, Maharashtra, India.

== The Institute ==
Balbharti was established by the Vasantrao Naik from the Government of Maharashtra on 27 January 1967. Balbharti was established after the recommendation of the Kothari Commission in 1964, that the state government establish an autonomous institution managed like a commercial enterprise for textbook production to improve the quality of textbooks for students in Maharashtra, and to make textbooks available at a reasonable price. Balbharati institute is an autonomous body registered under the Public Trusts Act 1950 and the Societies Registration Act, 1860.

== The Editorial Team ==
The editorial team consists of following members:

- Vijaya Wad
- Gajanan Chawhan
- H G Narlawar
- Rajeev Tambe
- Dilip Phaltankar
- Shrikant Chougule
- Madhav Rajguru

== Online Books ==
To address the issue of delayed textbook distribution, Balbharati has made soft copies of its textbooks available on its official website, allowing students to easily download their books. These e-books cover all subjects from the 1st to the 12th grade, and can be accessed for free from the Balbharati website.

Currently, the textbooks are available in eight languages:

- Marathi
- English
- Hindi
- Urdu
- Kannada
- Telugu
- Sindhi
- Gujarati

Additionally, Balbharati has made available 35 district-specific books for Standard III Geography, titled My District, which are accessible on the website.

Furthermore, Balbharati introduced the new syllabus for Class XI and Class XII in the academic years 2019–2020, 2020–2021 and 2021–2022, respectively, with these updated textbooks also available online.

== Domain change ==
In 2023, the domain originally used by bhalbharti was hacked . Since then, the official website of balbharti has been changed to
