= Dharangaon =

- City
- Location in Maharashtra, India Dharangaon (India)
- Coordinates: 21.02°N 75.27°E
- Country: India
- State: Maharashtra
- District: Jalgaon
- Elevation: 213 m (699 ft)

Population (2001)
  - Total: 33,618

Languages
  - Official: Marathi
- Time zone: UTC+5:30 (IST)

Dharangaon is a city and a municipal council in the Jalgaon district in the Indian state of Maharashtra. Dharangaon is also the tehsil headquarters in Jalgaon district.

== Demographics ==
As of 2001 India census, Dharangaon had a population of 33,625. Males constituted 51% and females 49%. Dharangaon has an average literacy rate of 70%, higher than the national average of 59.5%: male literacy is 74% and, female literacy is 57%. In Dharangaon, 13% of the population is under 6.

Most of the people communicate in Ahirani, a dialect of Marathi.

Year	Male	Female	Total Population	Change	Religion (%)							
Year	Male	Female	Total Population	Change	Hindu	Muslim	Christian	Sikhs	Buddhist	Jain	Other religions and persuasions	Religion not stated
2001	17275	16350	33625	-	73.487	23.973	0.205	0.107	0.851	1.312	0.000	0.065
2011	18211	17164	35375	0.052	73.015	24.851	0.161	0.099	0.481	1.368	0.000	0.025

== Economy ==
Agriculture is the main occupation. Major crops include cotton, corn, wheat, jawar, banana and sugarcane.

Trade in cotton and oilseed is conducted with Jalgaon, a railway station about twenty miles to the east. Many Dharangaon merchants have agents in Jalgaon. In the past Dharangaon paper and cloth were in high demand, and while the weaving of coarse cloth still gives employment to more than 100 looms, paper manufacture has since ceased.
