= North Maharashtra University =

University in Maharashtra, India

Coordinates: 21.0025°N 75.4969°E

Kavayitri Bahinabai Chaudhari North Maharashtra University
- KBCNMU
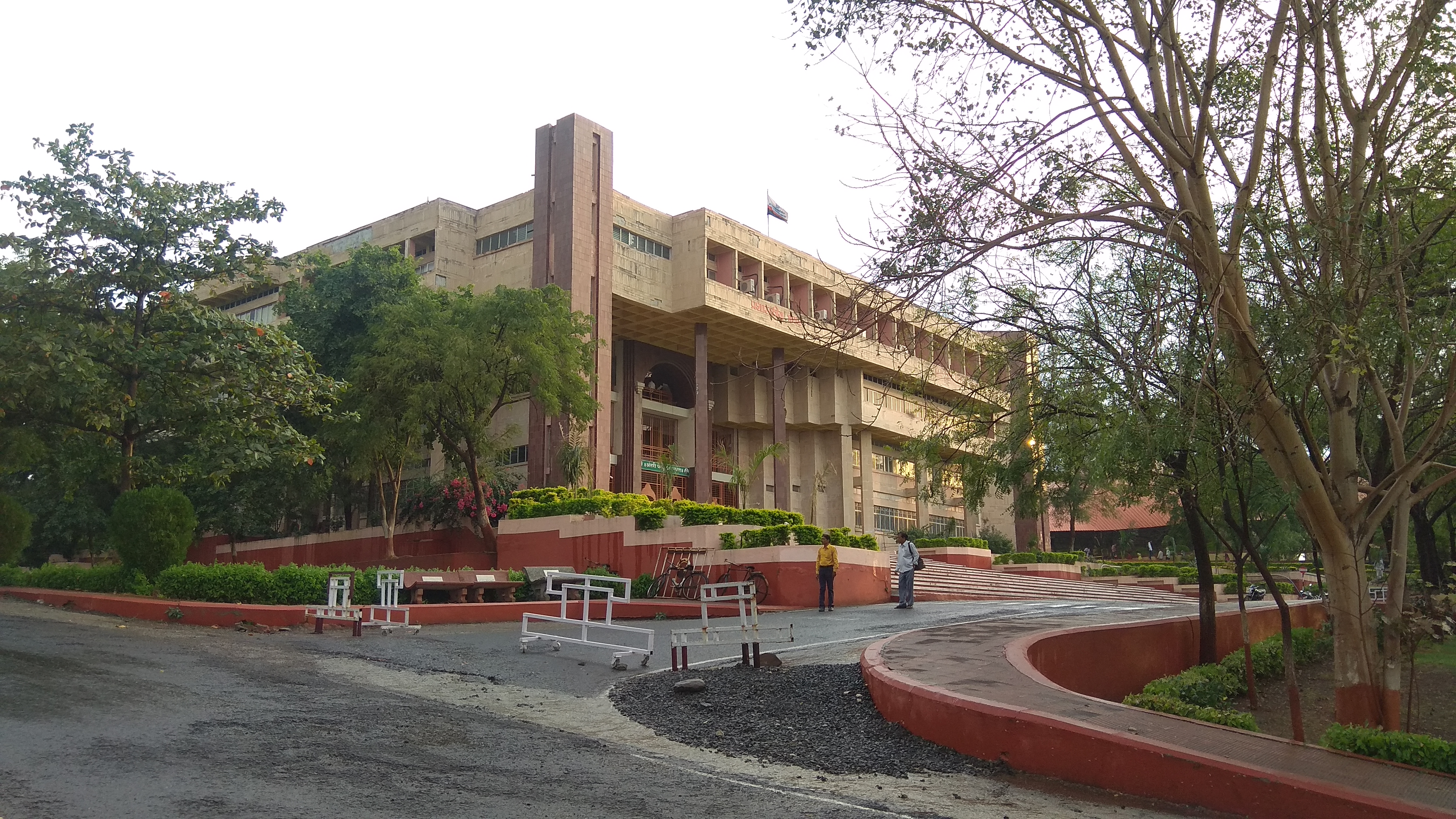
- The University main building
- Motto: "Teach One Each One & Tree One"
- Type: Public
- Established: 15 August 1990 (35 years ago)
- Affiliations: UGC
- Chancellor: Governor of Maharashtra
- Vice-Chancellor: V. L. Maheshwari
- Location: Jalgaon, Maharashtra, India, India
- Campus: Rural
- Website: nmu.ac.in

Kavayitri Bahinabai Chaudhari North Maharashtra University is a university in Jalgaon, Maharashtra. Formerly North Maharashtra University, it was established on 15 August 1990 after separating from the parent University of Pune.

== Accreditation History ==
The university has been accredited by the National Assessment and Accreditation Council over four cycles. In 2001, it received a 4-star status. This was followed by a 'B' grade (CGPA 2.88) in 2009. During its third and fourth cycles, the university maintained an 'A' grade with a CGPA of 3.11.
