= Amalner =

- Town
- Location in Maharashtra, India Amalner (India)
- Coordinates: 21.05°N 75.05°E
- Country: India
- State: Maharashtra
- District: Jalgaon
- Elevation: 344 m (1,129 ft)

Population (2011)
  - Total: 95,994

Languages
  - Official: Marathi
- Time zone: UTC+5:30 (IST)
- PIN: 425401

Amalner is a town and a municipal council in Jalgaon district in the state of Maharashtra, India, situated on the bank of the Bori River. Amalner is the birthplace of the Wipro company, which started business by producing vanaspati ghee from sunflower seeds there. Amalner is a tehsil in Jalgaon district.

Amalner lies on the Western Railway between Surat and Bhusawal. Amalner is well connected to the Central Railway through Jalgaon / Bhusaval as well as the Western through Surat.

== History ==
Amalner has a historical importance in the fields of education, industrialisation and independence movements. It is host to one of the oldest philosophical centres in India, the Pratap Tatwadnyan Mandir, formerly the Indian Institute of Philosophy.

Pandurang Sadashiv Sane, popularly known as Sane Guruji, was one of the famous teachers at Pratap high school. He fought for the independence of India, was a teacher, poet and writer, and wrote many books, including Shyamchi Aai and Bhartiya Sanskriti.

Shriram shastri Upasani was also resident of Amalner. He studied the Vedas, Upanishads and other Shastras in Kashi i.e. Varanasi in Gurukul system. Then he came back to Amalner and served as a teacher in Pratap high school and college. He also served to teach religious and philosophical studies to newly initiated Sanyasis of Hindu Jain and Buddhist society. Due to his knowledge in philosophy various intellectual were coming to meet him. He was having close intellectual relations with dr. Sarvepalli Radhakrishnan (former President of India).

In 1945, Azim Premji's father started the first dalda factory at Amalner, which is now known as a mother plant of the giant Wipro company. Amalner city is still densely populated with Wipro shareholders. Azim Premji visited Amalner's Wipro plant on 12 February 2013, to address the employees of the company. As of 2016, an estimated 3% of Wipro's shares were held by shareholders living in Amalner.

== Geography ==
Amalner is located at 18°56′N 75°20′E / 18.93°N 75.33°E / 18.93; 75.33[1]. It has an average elevation of 344 metres. It is 36 km from Dhule.

== Demographics ==
As of the Indian census of 2011, Amalner had a population of 95,994. Males constitute 52% of the population and females 48%. The average literacy rate is 73%, higher than the national average of 59.5%, with 57% of the males and 43% of females being literate. Some 12% of the population is under 6 years of age.

Year	Male	Female	Total Population	Change	Religion (%)							
Year	Male	Female	Total Population	Change	Hindu	Muslim	Christian	Sikhs	Buddhist	Jain	Other religions and persuasions	Religion not stated
2001	47,491	43,999	91,490	-	79.109	17.169	0.103	0.120	0.819	2.574	0.043	0.063
2011	49,564	46,430	95,994	0.049	77.101	18.701	0.130	0.100	1.606	2.093	0.024	0.245
