= Khandeshi language =

Indo-Aryan language spoken in India

Khandeshi
- Ahirani, Qhandeshi
- खान्देशी, अहिराणी
- Native to: Maharashtra, India
- Region: Khandesh
- Ethnicity: Khandeshi
- Native speakers: 1.86 million (2011 census)
- Language family: Indo-European: Indo-Iranian; Indo-Aryan; Western; Khandeshi
- Dialects: Khandeshi; Dangri; Ahirani
- Writing system: Devanagari

Language codes
- ISO 639-3: Either: khn – Khandeshi ahr – Ahirani (dialect)
- Glottolog: khan1272 Khandesi ahir1243 Ahirani (deprecated)
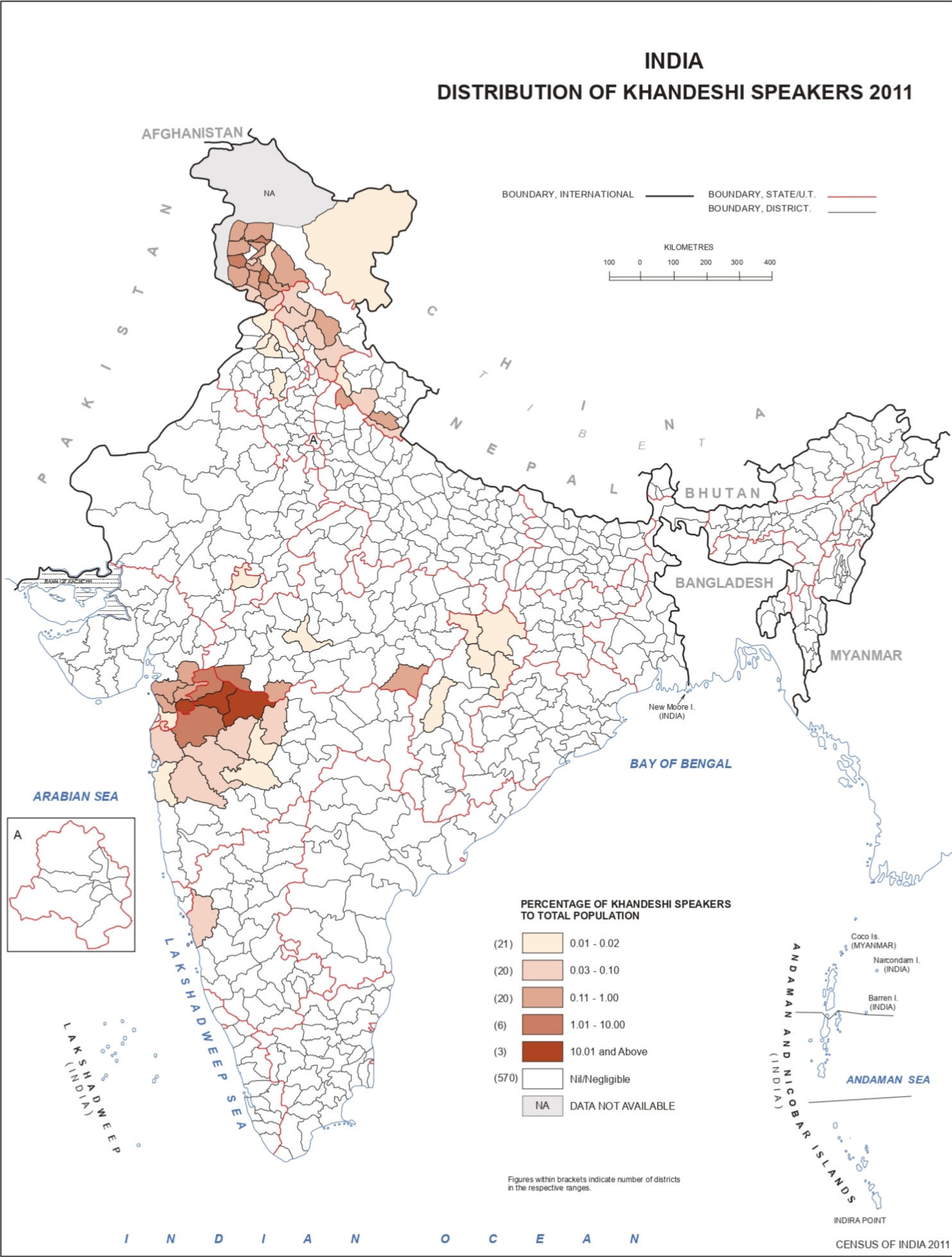
- Distribution of Khandeshi speakers (2011)

Khandeshi, also spelt Qhandeshi is an Indo-Aryan language spoken in the Khandesh region of north-west Maharashtra, and also in Gujarat. It consists of Khandeshi proper, and the Dangri and Ahirani dialects. Kunbi and Rangari are dialects. The Ahirani dialect of this language is the most spoken. Devanagari script is used to write Khandeshi language. The words "Ahirani" and "Khandeshi" are sometimes used interchangeably: Ahirani as the caste-based name (after Ahirs), and Khandesh as the region-based name. The Census of 1911, 1921 and 1931 counted the Ahirani speaking people as Gujaratis but in later decades they have been recognized as a different language.

== Phonology ==
=== Consonants ===
		Labial	Alveolar	Retroflex	Palatal	Velar	Glottal
Nasal	voiced	m	n	(ɳ)		ŋ	
Nasal	breathy	mʱ					
Stop/ Affricate	voiceless	p	t	ʈ	tʃ	k	
Stop/ Affricate	aspirated	pʰ	tʰ	ʈʰ	tʃʰ	kʰ	
Stop/ Affricate	voiced	b	d	ɖ	dʒ	g	
Stop/ Affricate	breathy	bʱ	dʱ	ɖʱ	dʒʱ	gʱ	
Fricative			s		ʃ		ɦ
Approximant	voiced	ʋ	l	(ɭ)	j		
Approximant	breathy	ʋʱ					
Rhotic	voiced		r				
Rhotic	breathy		rʱ				

- /n/ appears as a retroflex [ɳ] when before retroflex stops.
- /l/ appears as a retroflex [ɭ] when before retroflex stops.

=== Vowels ===
	Front	Central	Back
High	i		u
Mid	e		o
Low-mid		ɐ	
Low		a	

All vowels can be short or long.
