= Jalgaon district =

Coordinates: 18°39′0″N 75°6′0″E

- District of Maharashtra
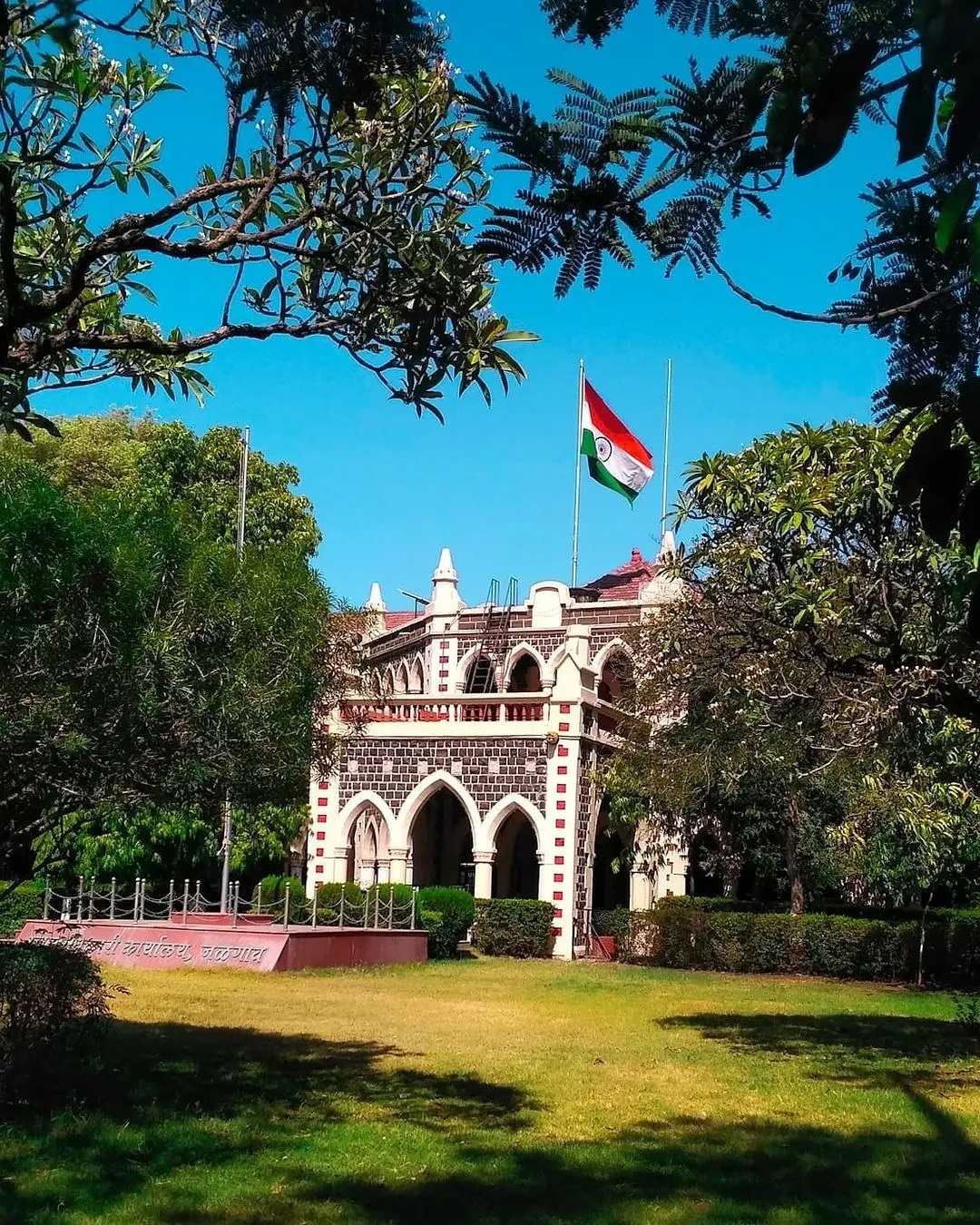
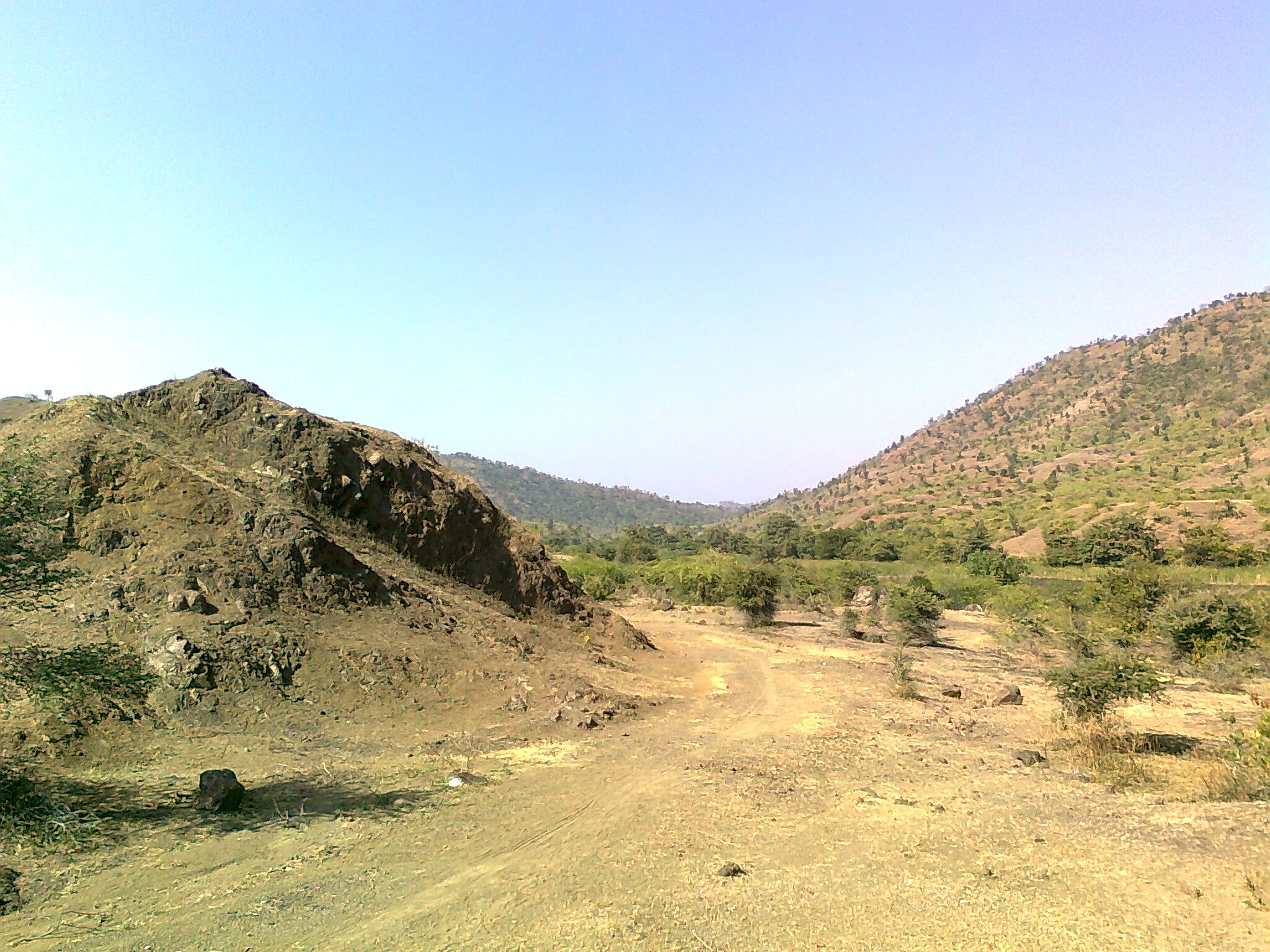
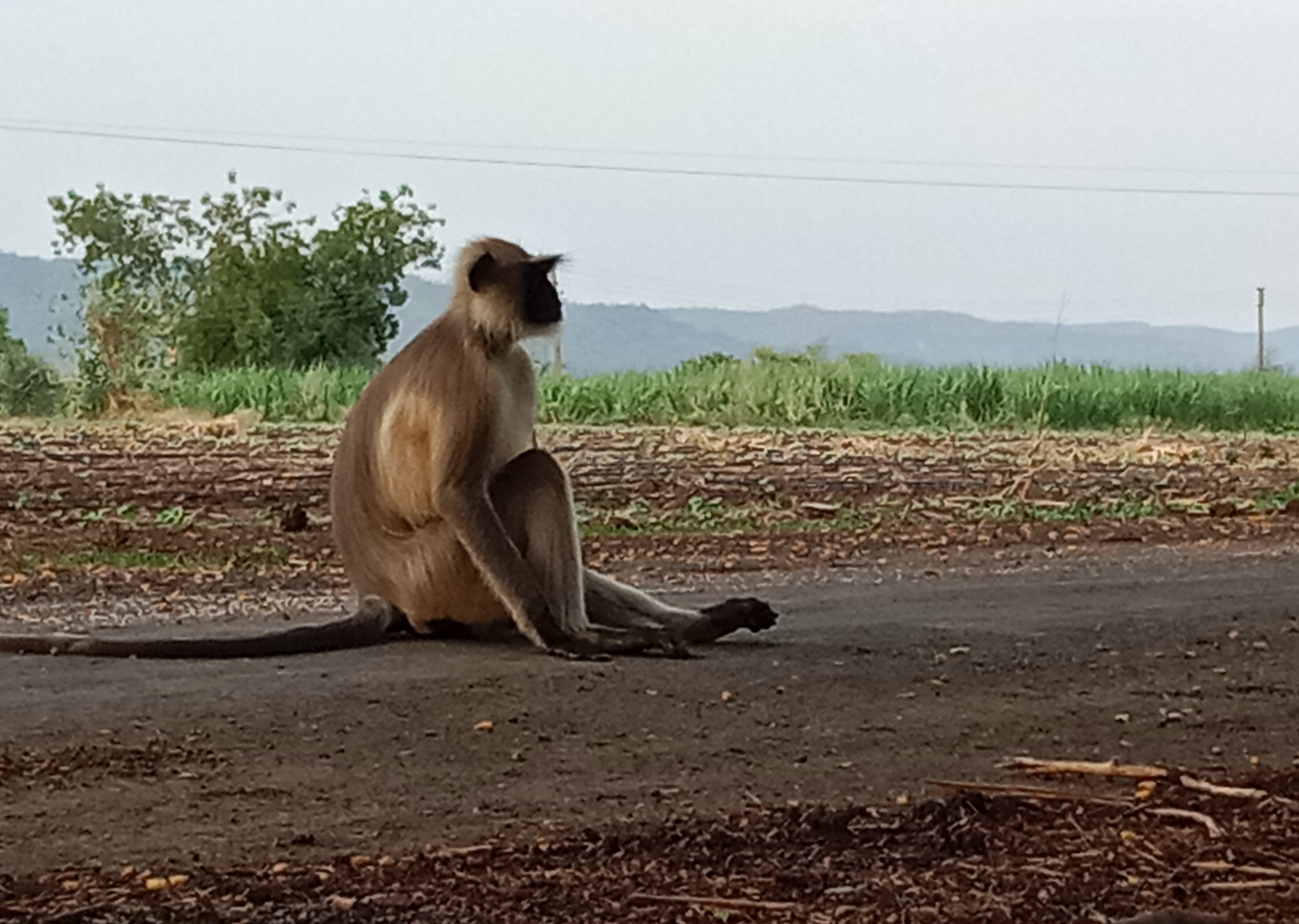
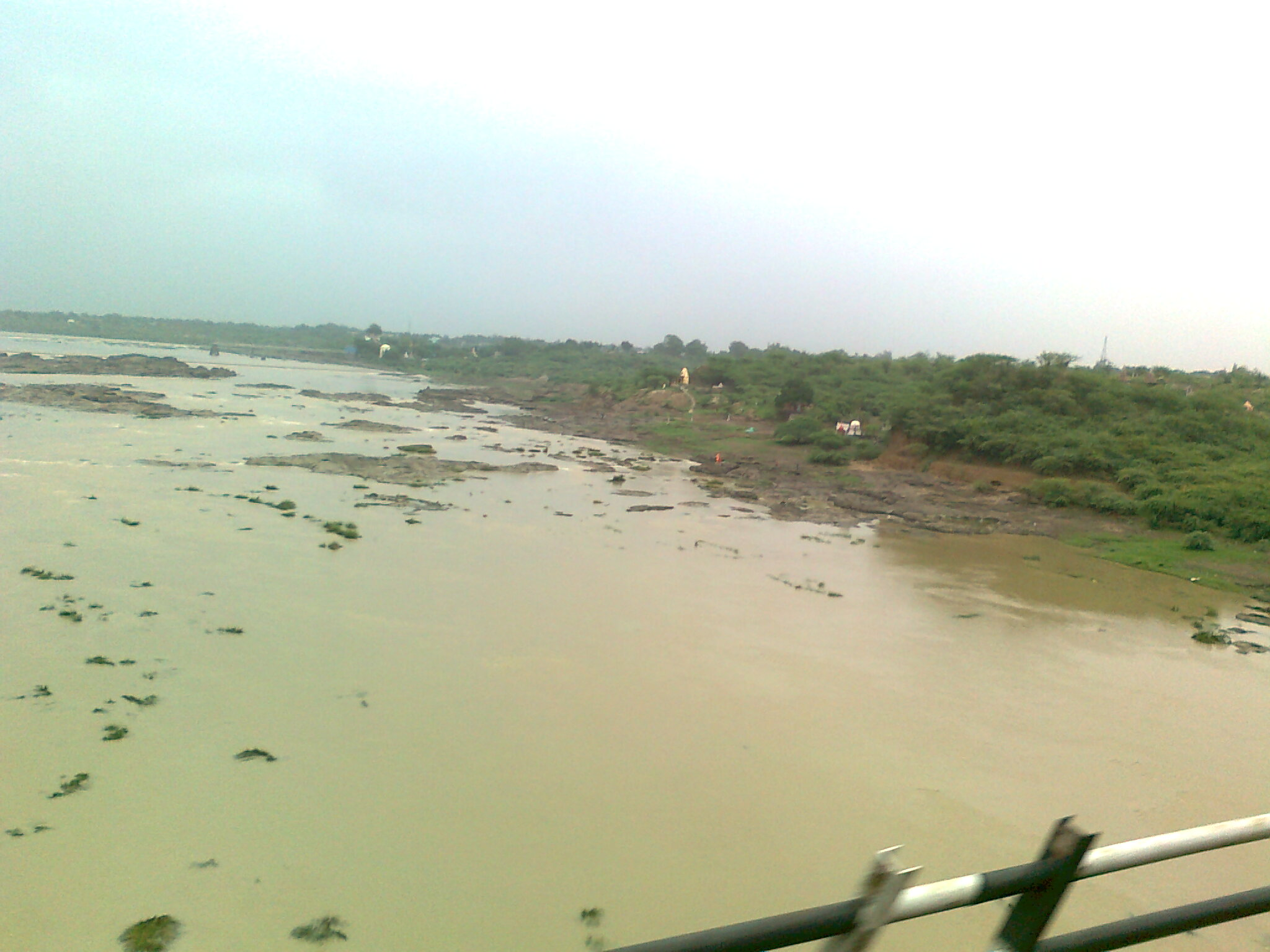
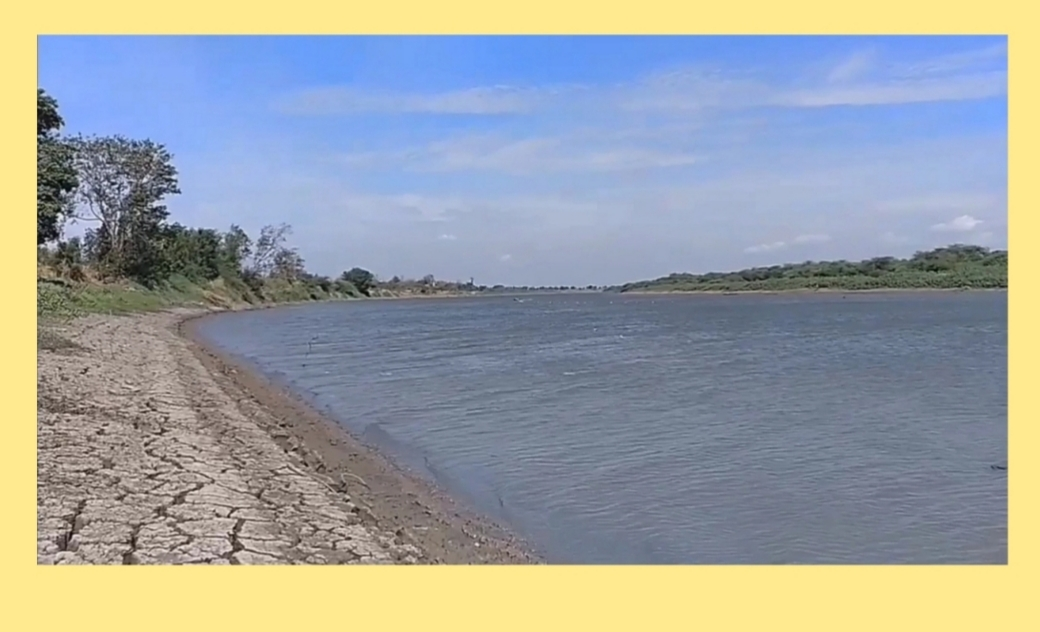
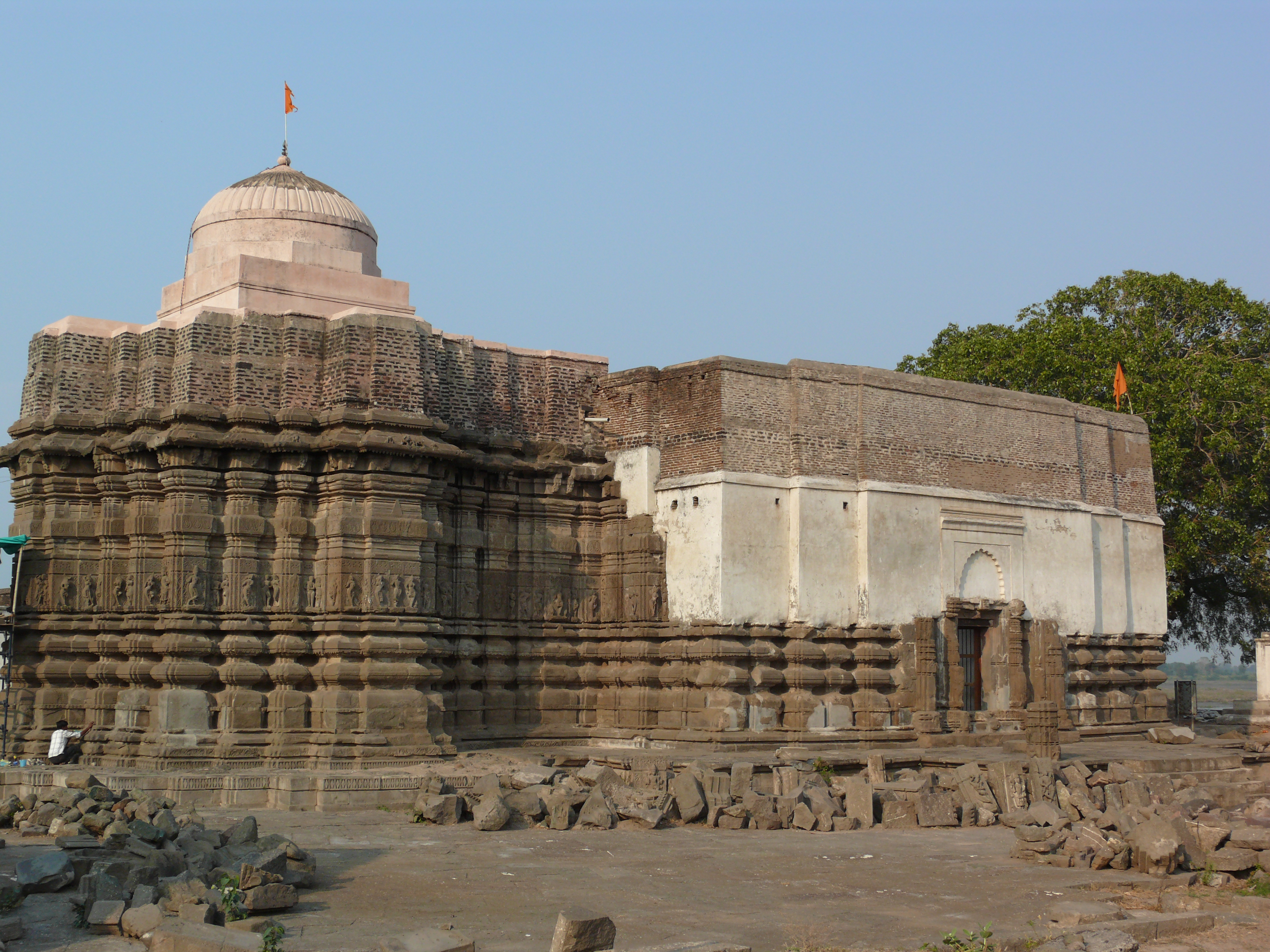
- Clockwise: Jalgaon district headquarter, a mountain view, a monkey in wild of Ghodasgaon, Purna river, Tapi river, and Changdeva Temple

- Location in Maharashtra
- Country: India
- State: Maharashtra
- Division: Nashik
- Headquarters: Jalgaon
- Tehsils: 1. Jalgaon; 2. Muktainagar; 3. Bhusawal; 4. Jamner; 5. Chalisgaon; 6. Bhadgaon; 7. Dharangaon; 8. Bodwad; 9. Yawal; 10.Raver; 11.Amalner; 12.Chopda; 12.Parola; 13.Pachora; 14. Erandol

Government
  - Body: Jalgaon Zilla Parishad
  - Guardian minister: Gulab Raghunath Patil (Cabinet Minister Mha)
  - President of the Zilla Parishad: Ranjanabai Pralhad Patil
  - District Collector: Ayush Prasad
  - CEO Zilla Parishad: Minal Karanwal
  - Members of the Lok Sabha: Smita Wagh(Jalgaon) Raksha Khadse(Raver)

Area
  - Total: 11,765 km^{2} (4,542 sq mi)

Population (2011)
  - Total: 4,229,917
  - Density: 359.53/km^{2} (931.19/sq mi)
  - Urban: 31.74%

Demographics
  - Literacy: 79.72%
  - Sex ratio: 925
- Time zone: UTC+05:30 (IST)
- PIN Code(s): 425xxx
- Vehicle registration: MH 19 (Jalgaon), MH 52 (Chalisgaon), MH 54 (Bhadgaon)
- Major highways: NH 53, NH-52, NH-753J, NH-753F,
- Average annual precipitation: 690 mm
- Website: jalgaon.gov.in

Jalgaon district (Marathi pronunciation: [d͡ʒəɭɡaːʋ]) is a district in Maharashtra, India. known with name of Administrative Headquarters in the Jalgaon city.

== Guardian Minister ==
Guardian Minister Jalna
- पालकमंत्री जालना
- Emblem of India
- Style: The Honourable
- Appointer: Chief Minister of Maharashtra
- Term length: 5 years / No time limit
- Website: http://http:

Disctrict is situated near by Ajanta Caves, It shares its northern border with the state of Madhya Pradesh. To the east Buldhana, to the southeast is Jalna, and to the south is Chhatrapati Sambhajinagar. Nashik borders the district to the southwest, and Dhule to the west. It is surrounded by the North Satpura mountain ranges to the south and the Ajanta mountain ranges to the west.

It serves as a significant trading hub for tea, gold, pulses, cotton, and bananas. It encompasses 1,513 villages and 20 towns, with a total population of 4,229,917 within an area of 11,765 square kilometers. It has Max temp : 48.0 °C, Min temp : 10.3 °C with average rainfall :690.2 mm.

== History ==
Historically, before 1906, the area was known as Khandesh district under British rule. On October 10, 1960, it became known as East Khandesh district (Devanagari: पुर्व खान्देश जिल्हा). This district was formed in 1906 when the British government bifurcated the original Khandesh district into East and West Khandesh. From 1906 to 1956, it was part of the Bombay Presidency, and between 1956 and 1960, it was included in the bilingual Bombay State.

Jalgaon is the eastern part of the Khandesh region, known in ancient times as Rasika. Southern parts of Jalgaon were controlled by the Vatsagumla Vakatakas by 5th century, as evidenced by copper plates dated to 316 and 367. Two plates were issued from Valkha, modern Waghli near Chalisgaon. In 10th and 11th century Jalgaon district constituted a part of Seuna-Desa of Yadav kingdom. It then became part of the Delhi Sultanate.

In 1795, the Nizam of Hyderabad was forced to cede Khandesh to the Marathas after the Battle of Kharda. Much of Khandesh was given to the Holkars, and the remainder was divided between the Peshwas and Scindias. The part the Peshwa received was made into a separate subha containing Gaulana, Khandesh, Meiwar, Bajagur, Pallnemaur, and Hindia. This included what would be known as Jalgaon district. After the Third Anglo-Maratha War this territory came under British control.

In 1864, Jalgaon municipality was established.

Before 1906, this district's region was part of Khandesh district. In 1906, it got divided into two districts : East Khandesh and West Khandesh, with East Khandesh covering the territory that is now Jalgaon district have. East Khandesh's Chalisgaon taluka's 13 enclave villages was transferred to neighbouring Aurangabad district.

After the 1956 reorganisation of India's states, East Khandesh became part of Bombay State. Four years later, in 1960, it became part of the newly formed Maharashtra and was renamed Jalgaon and Dhulia Districts, respectively.

=== Education ===
Kavayitri Bahinabai Chaudhari North Maharashtra University is a university in Jalgaon, Maharashtra was established in the city of Jalgaon on 15 August 1989 and serves as the regional university. Government Polytechnic Jalgaon was established in 1960. The district is also home to schools and colleges of the Khandesh Education Society and Maratha Vidya Prasarak Mandal and the Government Polytechnic Jalgaon.

Until 1960-61, there were only two colleges in Jalgaon district – Mooljee Jetha Arts and Science college and Pratap college at Amalner. These colleges were affiliated to Poona University. Around 1961, three more colleges started at Chalisgaon, Bhusawal and Faizpur.

=== Railways ===
In British Raj, the construction of a railway line in the limit of Khandesh district started in 1852 and opened for trains in 1861 and 1865. The British government also built a number of small station like Jalgaon, Nashirabad, Bhadli, Varangaon, Nandgaon, Chalisgaon stations in the cost of £300 to £500 (Rs 3000 - 15,000) with a station master's room and booking office. There has been built a big station at Bhusawal.

== Geography ==
The district covers an area of 11,765 km^{2}.

=== Climate ===
On average, Jalgaon receives between 77 cm and 80 cm of rainfall per year. In the easternmost part of the district—i.e., in Yawal—the average annual rainfall is 77 cm; in Bhusawal, Pachora, and the city of Jalgaon, it is 79 cm; and in Jamner, it is 80 cm.

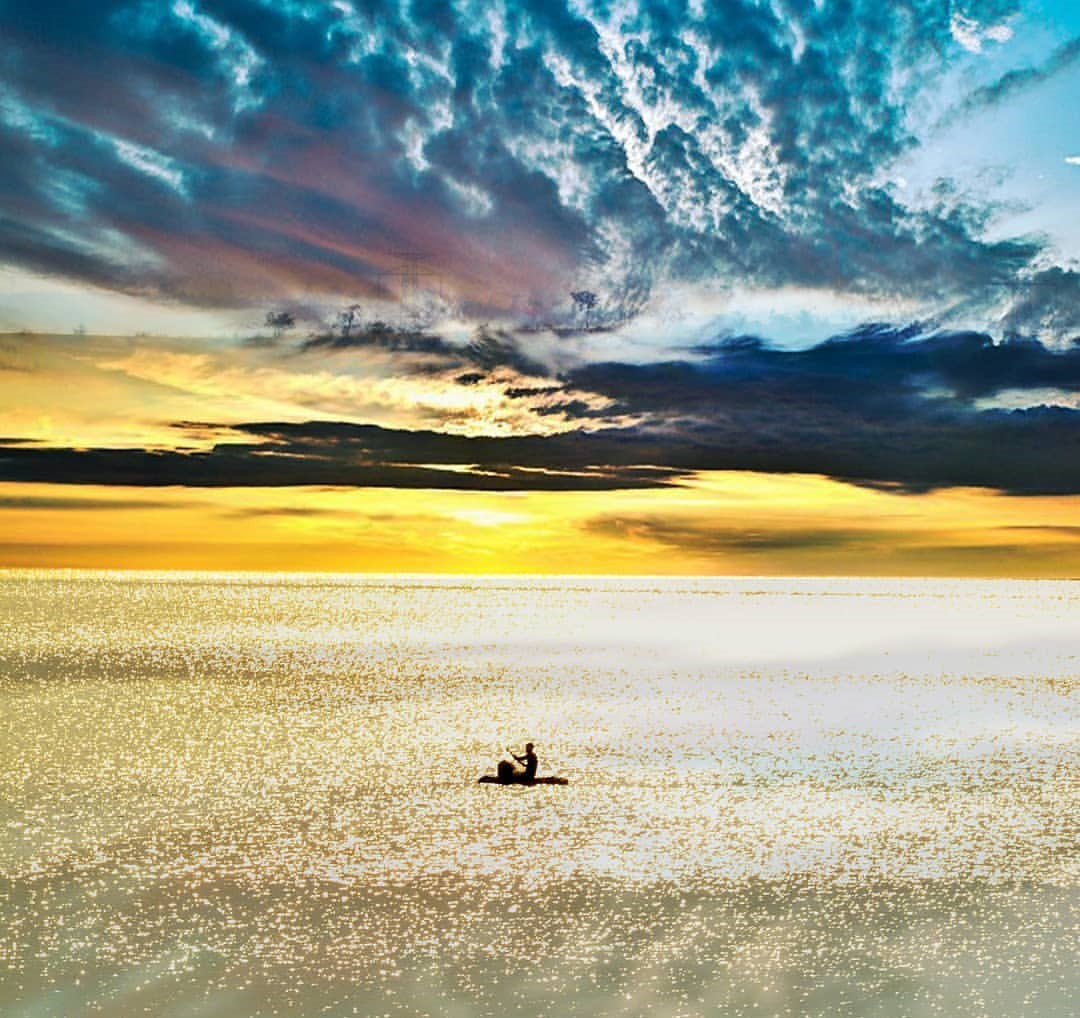
Waghur Dam Sunset

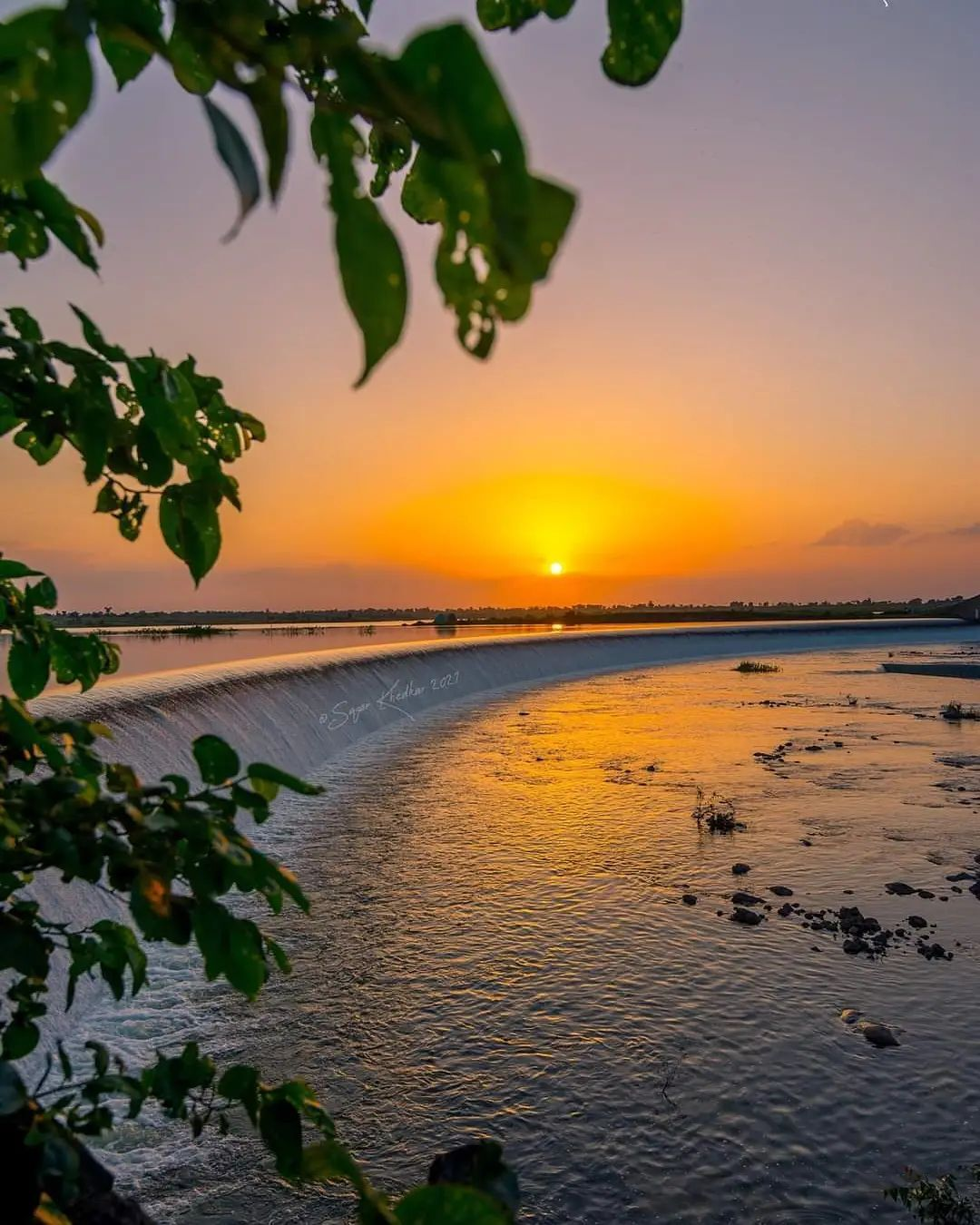
Manyad Dam

=== Rivers ===
The Tapi River flows through Jalgaon from the north. Its total length is 724 km, of which 208 km are in Maharashtra. The Tapti has numerous tributaries in and around the district, including the Purna, Aner, Bhuleshwari, Biswa, Chandrabhaga, Dolar, Gadgi, Kapara, Katpurna, Man, Morana, Nalganga, Nand, Pedhi, Sipana, and Wan Rivers. The Girna is another major river flowing through the talukas of Chalisgaon, Bhadgaon and Pachora.

== Divisions ==
Jalgaon district consists of 15 talukas, or tehsils: Dharangaon, Amalner, Bhadgaon, Bhusawal, Bodwad, Chalisgaon, Chopda, Erandol, Jalgaon, Jamner, Muktainagar, Pachora, Parola, Raver, and Yawal. Jalgaon city is the administrative headquarters.

The district has 11 constituencies in the Vidhan Sabha, the state legislative assembly: Amalner, Bhusawal, Chalisgaon, Chopda, Erandol, Jalgaon City, Jalgaon Rural, Jamner, Muktainagar, Pachora, and Raver. It has two constituencies in the Lok Sabha, the lower house of the Indian Parliament: Raver and Jalgaon.

== Administration ==
=== Members of Parliament ===
- Smita wagh (Jalgaon)

=== Guardian Minister ===
- Gulab Raghunath Patil - 27 September 2022 - Incumbent

== Demographics ==
Historical population

Year	Pop.	±% p.a.
1901	954,077	—
1911	1,028,126	+0.75%
1921	1,069,656	+0.40%

Year	Pop.	±% p.a.
1931	1,198,260	+1.14%
1941	1,320,074	+0.97%
1951	1,471,351	+1.09%

Year	Pop.	±% p.a.
1961	1,765,047	+1.84%
1971	2,123,121	+1.86%
1981	2,618,274	+2.12%

Year	Pop.	±% p.a.
1991	3,187,634	+1.99%
2001	3,682,690	+1.45%
2011	4,229,917	+1.40%

Religions in Jalgaon district (2011)
Religion	Percent
Hinduism	81.74%
Islam	13.25%
Buddhism	3.40%
Jainism	0.65%
Other or not stated	0.96%

As of the 2011 census, Jalgaon district had a population of 4,229,917, roughly equal to that of the Republic of the Congo or the United States' state of Kentucky. It is the 46th most populous of India's 640 districts. The population density is 359 inhabitants per square kilometre (930/sq mi). The population growth rate from 2001 to 2011 was 14.71%. Jalgaon has a sex ratio of 925 females for every 1000 males, and a literacy rate of 79.73%. 31.74% of the population lives in urban areas. Scheduled Castes and Scheduled Tribes make up 9.20% and 14.28% of the population respectively.

=== Languages ===
In the Jalgaon District, languages such as Marathi, Ahirani, Hindi and English were spoken. Ahirani is a regional language predominantly used in Maharashtra's Khandesh region.

Languages in Jalgaon district (2011)
1. Marathi (63.5%)
2. Khandeshi (12.2%)
3. Urdu (7.74%)
4. Hindi (6.02%)
5. Lambadi (2.77%)
6. Bhili (1.61%)
7. Pawri (1.47%)
8. Tadvi (1.14%)
9. Other (3.65%)

At the time of the 2011 Census of India, 63.45% of the population in the district spoke Marathi, 12.15% Khandeshi, 7.74% Urdu, 6.02% Hindi, 2.77% Lambadi, 1.61% Bhili, 1.47% Pawri and 1.00% Tadvi as their first language.

=== Medical Education ===
Government Medical College, Jalgaon is a tertiary medical college in Jalgaon that was established in 2018 and offers undergraduate course in MBBS. Dr. Ulhas Patil Medical college. is a privately operated medical college.

== Literature ==
Jalgaon district is the birthplace of the Marathi poet Bahinabai Chaudhari, who wrote many poems addressing to the village life and about rural women's and hardship of farmers of the district. Balkawi alias Trambak Bapuji Thombre was born in Jalgaon. To honor the literary work of Bahinabai, North Maharashtra University adapted her name and now the university is known as Bahinabai Chaudhari North Maharashtra University.

== Economy ==
The district is well known for its significant banana cultivation. The district's administrative center, Jalgaon city, is a well known hub for gold jewellery shopping and business. The Bhusawal Thermal Power Station is near Bhusaval.

== Media ==
The major Marathi-language newspapers and news media published in Jalgaon are Deshdoot, Deshonnati, Divya Marathi, Lokmat, Maharashtra Times, and Sakal, Tarun Bharat and Bharat Live News Media.

== Notable people ==
- Hari Narayan Apte (1864–1919), a Marathi writer.
- Balkavi (1890–1918), Marathi poet.
- Bahinabai Chaudhari (1880–1951), an illiterate cotton farmer, her poetry published posthumously, helped popularize Ahirani dialect.
- Bhalchandra Nemade (1938-), Marathi Writer.
- Bhavarlal Jain (1937–2016), an entrepreneur who founded Jain Irrigation Systems
- Suresh Jain, 8 times MLA from city and Ex-minister in government of Maharashtra.
- Eknath Khadse (1952–present), Former Revenue minister of Maharashtra, veteran NCP politician.
- Girish Mahajan (1960–present), MLA, politician and Minister of Water Resources and Disaster Management of Maharashtra.
- Gulab Raghunath Patil (1966–present), MLA, Senior Leader of Shiv Sena and Minister in Maharashtra
- Namdeo Dhondo Mahanor (1942–present), a Marathi poet and recipient of the Padma Shri award
- Ujjwal Nikam (1953–present), MP and a public prosecutor who has worked on high-profile murder and terrorism cases
- Pratibha Patil (1934–present), Former first woman president of India (2007–12), MP and governor of Rajasthan (2004–07)
- Bahadur Nariman Kavina, prominent Indian naval officer
- Azim Premji (1945–present), an entrepreneur who founded Wipro Limited
- Chandrakant Sonawane, MLA and Shiv Sena leader.

== Geographical indication ==
=== Jalgaon Bharit Brinjal ===
Jalgaon Bharit Brinjal was awarded the Geographical Indication (GI) status tag from the Geographical Indications Registry, under the Union Government of India, on 3 June 2016 and is valid until 29 September 2024.

Navnirmiti Shetkari Mandal from Asoda, proposed the GI registration of Jalgaon Bharit Brinjal. After filing the application in September 2014, the Brinjal was granted the GI tag in 2016 by the Geographical Indication Registry in Chennai, making the name "Jalgaon Bharit Brinjal" exclusive to the Brinjal grown in the region. It thus became the first brinjal variety from Maharashtra and the 23rd type of goods from Maharashtra to earn the GI tag.

=== Jalgaon Banana ===
Jalgaon Banana was awarded the Geographical Indication (GI) status tag from the Geographical Indications Registry, under the Union Government of India, on 30 October 2016 and is valid until 29 September 2024.

Nisargraja Krushi Vidnyan Kendra from Jalgaon, proposed the GI registration of Jalgaon banana. After filing the application in August 2014, the banana was granted the GI tag in 2016 by the Geographical Indication Registry in Chennai, making the name "Jalgaon Banana" exclusive to the bananas grown in the region. It thus became the first banana variety from Maharashtra and the 28th type of goods from Maharashtra to earn the GI tag.
