= Sonale =

Village in Maharashtra

- Village
- Location in Maharashtra, India Sonale (India)
- Coordinates: 20.7448169°N 75.6859517°E
- Country: India
- State: Maharashtra
- District: Jalgaon

Government
  - Type: Gram Panchayat

Population (2014)
  - Total: 4,500

Languages
  - Official: Marathi
- Time zone: UTC+5:30 (IST)
- PIN: 424205
- Telephone code: +91-2580
- Vehicle registration: MH-19
- Lok Sabha Constituency: Raver
- Vidhan Sabha Constituency: Jamner

Sonale is a village situated on the south side of the Jamner Tehsil in Jalgaon district of the Indian state of Maharashtra. It is 16 km away from Jamner Tehsil and 36 kilometres from Jalgaon city and is located within the productive, irrigated agricultural region of Khandesh.

== Language ==
People in this village speak the Ahirani and Marathi languages.

== Geography ==
It has average elevation of 281 metres from sea level.

== Demographics ==
As of 2011 Census, Sonale had a population of 4500.

== Education ==
Sonale has a Marathi medium school established in 1902 and has educational facilities up to 7th grade for Sonale and nearby villages students.

== Economy ==
The dominant occupation in the village is farming. The area is bestowed with rich, black soil and uses advanced irrigation techniques. Cotton, wheat, groundnuts, jowar, bajra, dadar and vegetables are the main crops. Products are traded in markets such as Pahur and Shendurni. Many farmers are actively involved in finding new and convenient techniques of farming.

Other professions include dairy farming, restaurants, retail stores, garages, etc. More than 20 young people from the village serve in state and central defence forces. Over 10 Master's degree holders from Khadakdeola work in diverse fields such as mechanical, chemical, IT/Software, hospitality and management.

== Cultural activities ==
ShivJayanti, Ganesh Chaturthi, Krishna Jamanshtami, Navratri, Hanuman Jayanti, Ram Navami, Makar Sankranti, Gudhi Padwa, Akshay Tritya (Aakhaji), Pola, Dasra, Holi, and Diwali are the main festivals.

During the Makar Sankranti and Dasra celebrations, people do Pranam to elders, while distributing sweets (Til Gul) and Gold (Aptyachi Pane).

== See also ==
- Jamner
- Jamner Railway Station
- Pahur
