= Kishor Appa Patil =

Indian politician

- किशोर पाटील
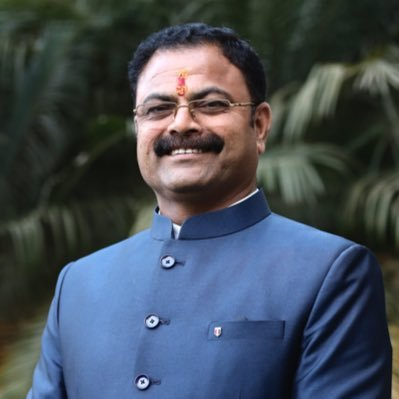

Member of Maharashtra Legislative Assembly
- Incumbent
- Assumed office 2014
- Preceded by: Dilip Wagh
- Constituency: Pachora

Personal details
- Born: 1 November 1970 (age 56) Anturli, Taluka - Pachora, District - Jalgaon
- Party: Shiv Sena
- Website: https://kishorappa.in/
- As of 31 January, 2015

Kishor Dhansing Patil is an Indian politician and member of Maharashtra Legislative Assembly from Pachora Vidhansabha Constituency, Jalgaon.

== Professional and political career ==
Kishor Patil started his professional career as a cadet in the police department and as an agriculturist. At the age of 31, Patil contested (and was elected at) his first election to the Pachora Municipal corporation and was elected as President from the Pachora Municipal constituency in 2001. He acts as Vice-Chairman of Jalgaon District Shivsena.

== Positions held ==
- 2014: Elected to Maharashtra Legislative Assembly
- 2015: Elected as Director of Jalgaon District Central Co-operative Bank
- 2015: Elected as Vice President of Jalgaon District Central Co-operative Bank
- 2019: Re-Elected to Maharashtra Legislative Assembly
- 2021: Re-Elected as Director of Jalgaon District Central Co-operative Bank

== See also ==
- Pachora
- Pachora Junction
- Pachora Municipal Council
- Jalgaon Lok Sabha constituency
