= Pachora–Jamner Passenger =

Train in India

Pachora - Jamner Passenger
Overview
- Service type: Passenger
- Current operator: Central Railways

Route
- Termini: Pachora Junction; Jamner
- Stops: 7
- Distance travelled: 56 km (35 mi)
- Average journey time: 2 hours 05 minutes
- Service frequency: daily
- Train number: 52121 / 52122

On-board services
- Class: General Unreserved
- Seating arrangements: Yes
- Sleeping arrangements: No
- Catering facilities: No Pantry Car attached
- Other facilities: No

Technical
- Rolling stock: Standard Indian Railways coaches
- Track gauge: 762 mm (2 ft 6 in)

Pachora - Jamner Passenger is a passenger train belonging to Indian Railways that runs between Pachora Junction to Jamner in India.

It operates as train number 52121 from Pachora Junction to Jamner and as train number 52122 in the reverse direction.

== Service ==
Pachora - Jamner Passenger has a total of 7 halts and 1 Intermediate Stations from Pachora Junction to Jamner and covers a distance of 56 km in 2 hours 5 minutes. The Pachora - Jamner Passenger is a train that comes under Bhusawal Railway Division of Indian Railways.

== Routing ==
The 52121/22 Pachora - Jamner Passenger runs via Varkhedi, Pimpalgaon Bk., Shendurni, Pahur, Bhagdara, to Jamner.

== See also ==
- Indian Railways
