= Pachora–Jamner railway =

Railway section in India

Pachora–Jamner section

Overview
- Status: Non-Operational due to conversion to Broad gauge
- Owner: Indian Railways
- Locale: Maharashtra
- Termini: Pachora; Jamner
- Stations: 9

Service
- Operator: Western Railway

Technical
- Track length: 56 km (35 mi)
- Number of tracks: 1
- Track gauge: 5 ft 6 in (1,676 mm)

The Pachora–Jamner 2 ft 6 in (762 mm) narrow-gauge railway line was opened by Central Province Railway in 1919.

== History ==
The Pachora–Jamner railway line was constructed by Messrs Shapoorji Godbole and Co. of Bombay. The Pachora–Pahur section was opened up in 1918 and the rest of the sections in 1919. On termination of the contracts with the former Great Indian Peninsula Railway Company, the line was brought under direct state management with effect from 1 July 1925. Total length of the railway was 34.62 miles.

Pachora–Jamner Passenger has a total of 7 halts and 1 Intermediate Stations from Pachora Junction to Jamner and covers a distance of 56 km in 2 hours 5 minutes. Pachora–Jamner Passenger is a train that comes under Bhusawal Railway Division of Indian Railways.

== Conversion to broad gauge ==
In 2016, Indian Railways announced that the railway would be converted to 1,676 mm (5 ft 6 in) broad gauge.
