= Dilip Wagh =

Dilip Onkar Wagh

Member of Legislative Assembly of Maharashtra
- In office 2009–2014
- Preceded by: Tatyasaheb R.O. Patil
- Succeeded by: Kishor Appa Patil
- Constituency: Pachora

Personal details
- Born: 22 August 1966 (age 59) Taluka - Pachora, District - Jalgaon
- Party: Nationalist Congress Party

Dilip Onkar Wagh is a leader of National Congress Party and a former member of Maharashtra Legislative Assembly. He was the MLA from the Pachora Vidhansabha constituency from the year 2007 to 2012. Later he was defeated by Kishor Appa Patil second term MLA of Pachora-Bhadgaon Vidhansabha Constituency. Wagh has been interested in politics and social work since his college period. Doing continuous work at the level of people, people elected him as the MLA from the Pachora Vidhansabha constituency. Wagh's colleagues have been supporting him until now including Vikas Santosh Patil, Ranjit Patil, Nitin Tawde, and many more, he has a huge reputation in Pachora city. He has made Nationalist Congress Party to come up in the city and has a successful reputation over Pachora Municipal Council having 7 corporators of different wards.
