= Jamner railway station =

Railway Station in Maharashtra, India

Jamner
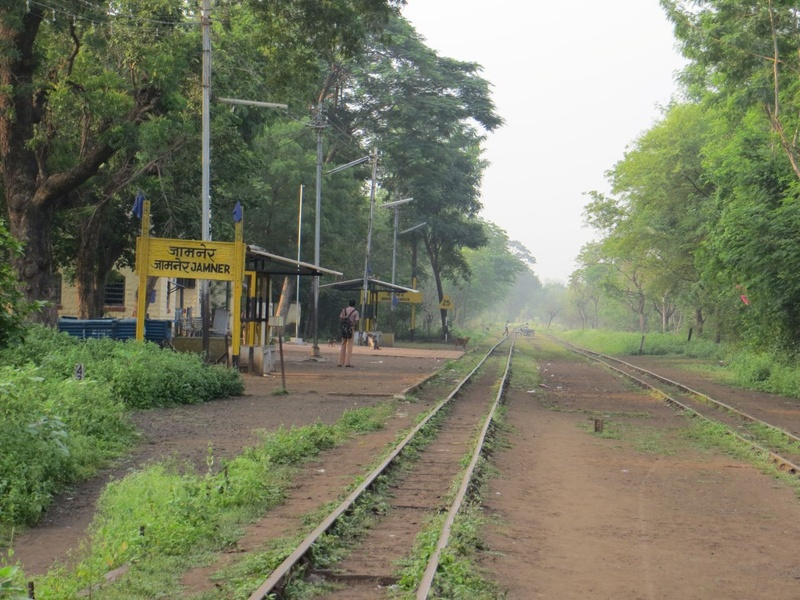
- Jamner railway station

General information
- Location: Jamner, Maharashtra, Pincode 424206; Maharashtra India
- Coordinates: 20°48′23″N 75°46′29″E
- Elevation: 261 metres (856 ft)
- System: Indian Railways station
- Owner: Indian Railways
- Operator: Central Railway
- Line: Pachora–Jamner railway
- Platforms: 1
- Tracks: 1

Construction
- Structure type: At ground
- Parking: Available

Other information
- Status: Not Functioning
- Station code: JMNR
- Zone(s): Central Railway
- Division(s): Bhusawal

History
- Opened: 1919
- Electrified: Ongoing
- Former names: Great Indian Peninsula Railway
Location
- Location within India Location within Maharashtra

Jamner railway station serves Jamner in Jalgaon district in the Indian state of Maharashtra.

== History ==
The Pachora–Jamner railway line was constructed by Messrs Shapoorji Godbole and Co. of Bombay. The Pachora–Pahur section was opened up in 1918 and the rest of the sections in 1919. On termination of the contracts with the former Great Indian Peninsula Railway Company, the line was brought under direct State management with effect from 1 July 1925.

This is a narrow-gauge (2 ft 6 in) line with a length of 34.62 miles. It passes through more or less plain countryside with banana orchards at many a place.

== Service ==
Pachora–Jamner Passenger has a total of seven halts and one intermediate station from Pachora Junction to Jamner and covers a distance of 56 km. in 2 hours 5 minutes. The Pachora–Jamner Passenger is a train that comes under Bhusawal railway division of Indian Railways.

== See also ==
- Jamner
- Jamner Municipal Council
