= Khadakdeola =

Village in Maharashtra

- Village
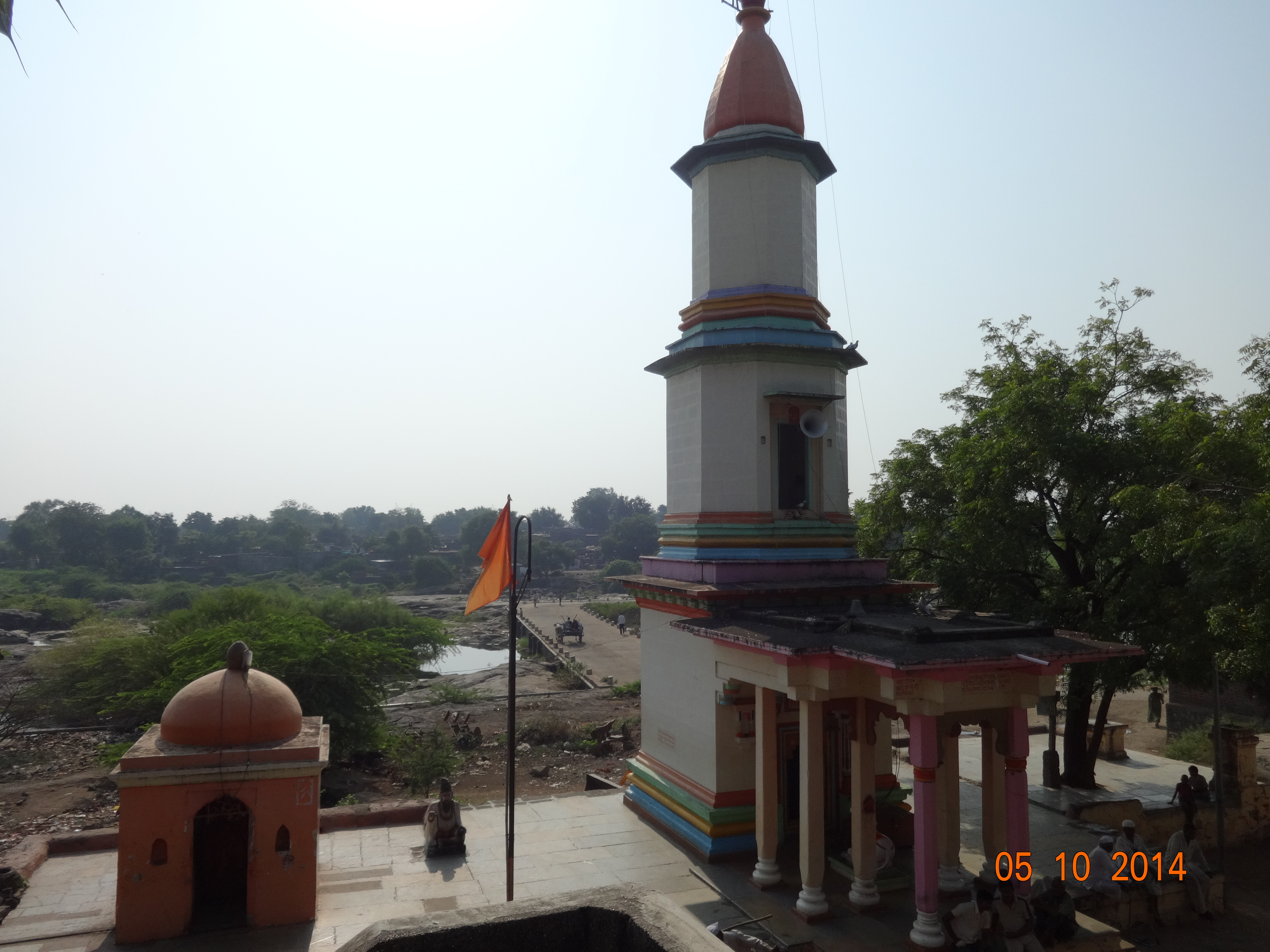
- Temple of Lord Shiva in Khadakdeola

- Location in Maharashtra, India Khadakdeola (India)
- Coordinates: 20.60498915°N 75.35260677°E
- Country: India
- State: Maharashtra
- District: Jalgaon

Government
  - Type: Gram Panchayat

Population (2011)
  - Total: 7,000

Languages
  - Official: Marathi
- Time zone: UTC+5:30 (IST)
- PIN: 424201
- Telephone code: 02596
- Vehicle registration: MH-19
- Nearest city: Pachora
- Lok Sabha Constituency: Jalgaon
- Vidhan Sabha Constituency: Pachora
- As of 7 September 2021

Khadakdeola or Khadakdeole is a village situated on the banks of a Hivra River of the Pachora Tehsil in Jalgaon district, Maharashtra, India. It is 6 km from Pachora Tehsil and 55 kilometres from Jalgaon city and is located within the productive, irrigated agricultural region of Khandesh. It lies on the border of Jalgaon and Aurangabad districts.

== Language ==
People in this village speak Ahirani and Marathi language.

== Gram Panchayat ==
Khadakdeola has an active Gram panchayat which is known as local government. People in this village are very active in political activities and contribute in district politics.

== Hivra Dam ==
The Hivra Dam (also known as the Hirawa Dam) is an earthfill dam on the Hivra River at Khadakdeola. It is one of the main sources of water for Pachora and nearby villages.[1] It also supplies water for irrigation in the area. The dam was completed in 1994.

The project irrigates annually an area of 4,204 hectares in nearby villages. It also provides drinking water to Tarkheda, Jargaon and Pachora city.

Location	Pachora
Year of completion	1994
Estimated cost of project	162,898,000
Height of dam sanctioned (metres)	15.21
Canal sanctioned length (km)	12 km
Maximum capacity (million cubic metres)	12.77
Irrigated area in the year (hectares)	4204
Usage of water for drinking purposes (million cubic metres)	1.13
Usage of water for agricultural purposes (million cubic metres)	7.74

== Geography ==
It has average elevation of 281 metres from sea level.

== Demographics ==
As of 2011 Census, Khadakdeola had a population of 7,000. Khadakdeola's zipcode is 424201 and Telephone area code is 02596.

== Educational institutes ==
Khadakdeola has a Marathi medium school established in 1914 and has educational facilities up to 10th grade for Khadakdeola and nearby villages Student.

== Occupations and economy ==
The dominant occupation in the village is farming. The area is bestowed with rich black soil and uses advanced irrigation techniques. Cotton, wheat, groundnuts, jowar, bajra, dadar and vegetables are the main crop products of the village. Given good transport facilities, products are traded in markets such as Pachora and Varkhedi. Many farmers are actively involved in finding new and convenient techniques of farming. Other people have opted for professions such as dairy farming or operation of restaurants, retail stores, garages, etc. Ph.D holders are also from the village. Over more than 20 young people from the village are serving in state and central defence forces. Over 10 Master's degree holders from Khadakdeola are associated with organizations in diverse fields such as mechanical, chemical, IT/Software, hospitality and management.

== Cultural activities ==
Cultural activities are a core attribute of Khadakdeola Bk. Shiv Jayanti, Ganesh Chaturthi, Krishna Jamanshtami, Navratri, Hanuman Jayanti, Ram Navami, Makar Sankranti, Gudhi Padwa, Akshay Tritya (Aakhaji), Pola, Dasra, Holi, and Diwali are the main festivals celebrated together in Khadakdeola. During the Makar Sankranti and Dasra celebrations, people meet each other and do Pranam to elders, while distributing sweets (Til Gul) and Gold (Aptyachi Pane).

== Gallery ==
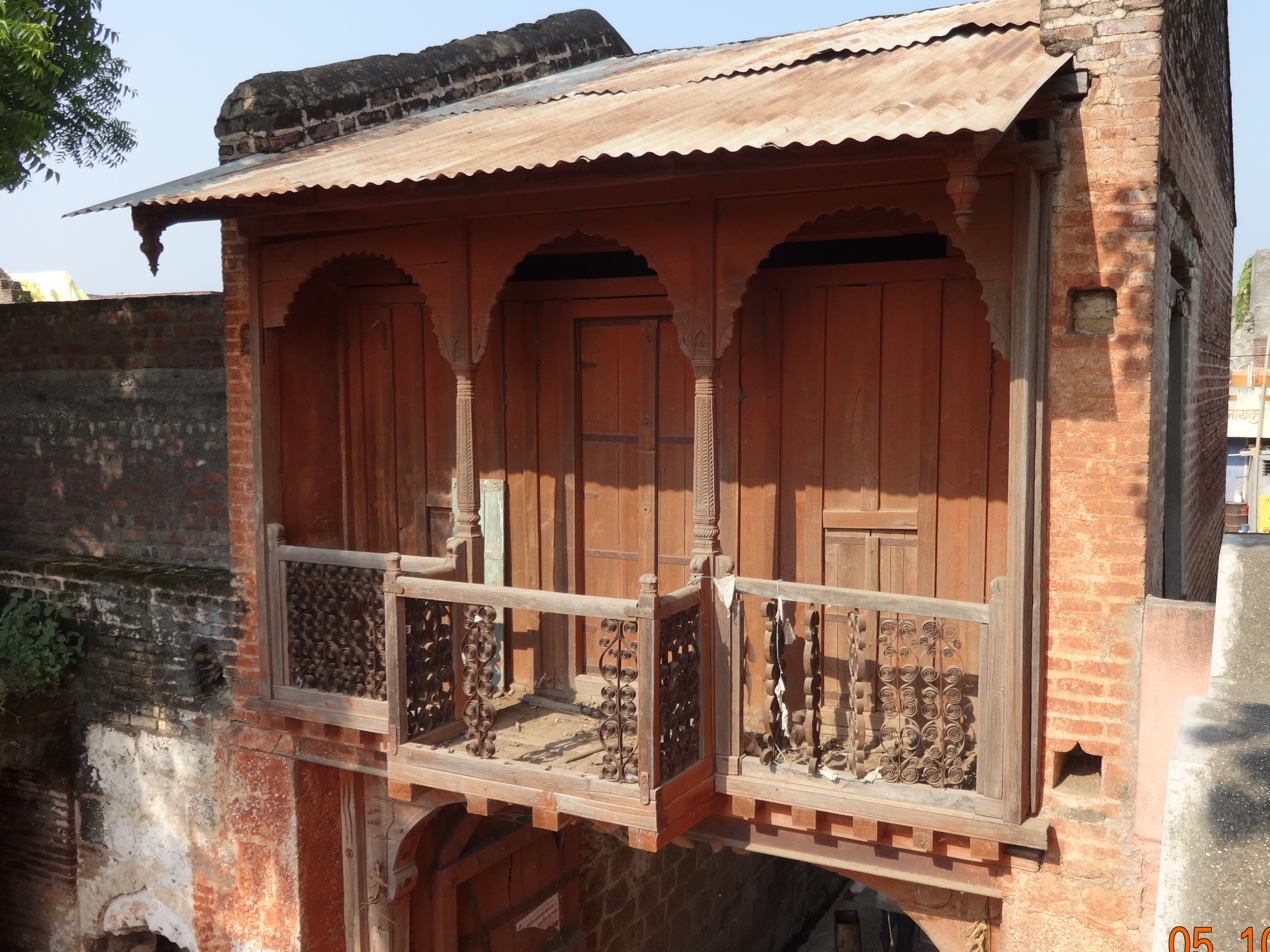
Gaon Darwaja Khadakdeola

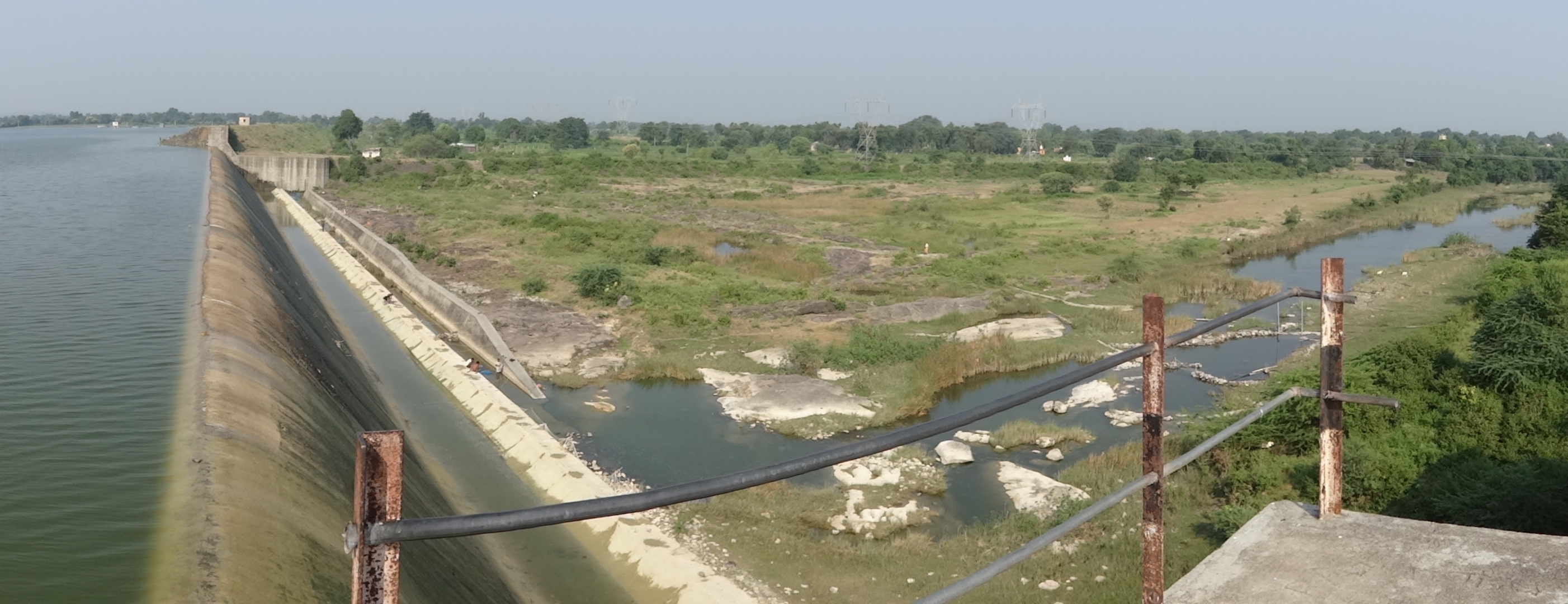
Hivra Dam, Khadakdeola

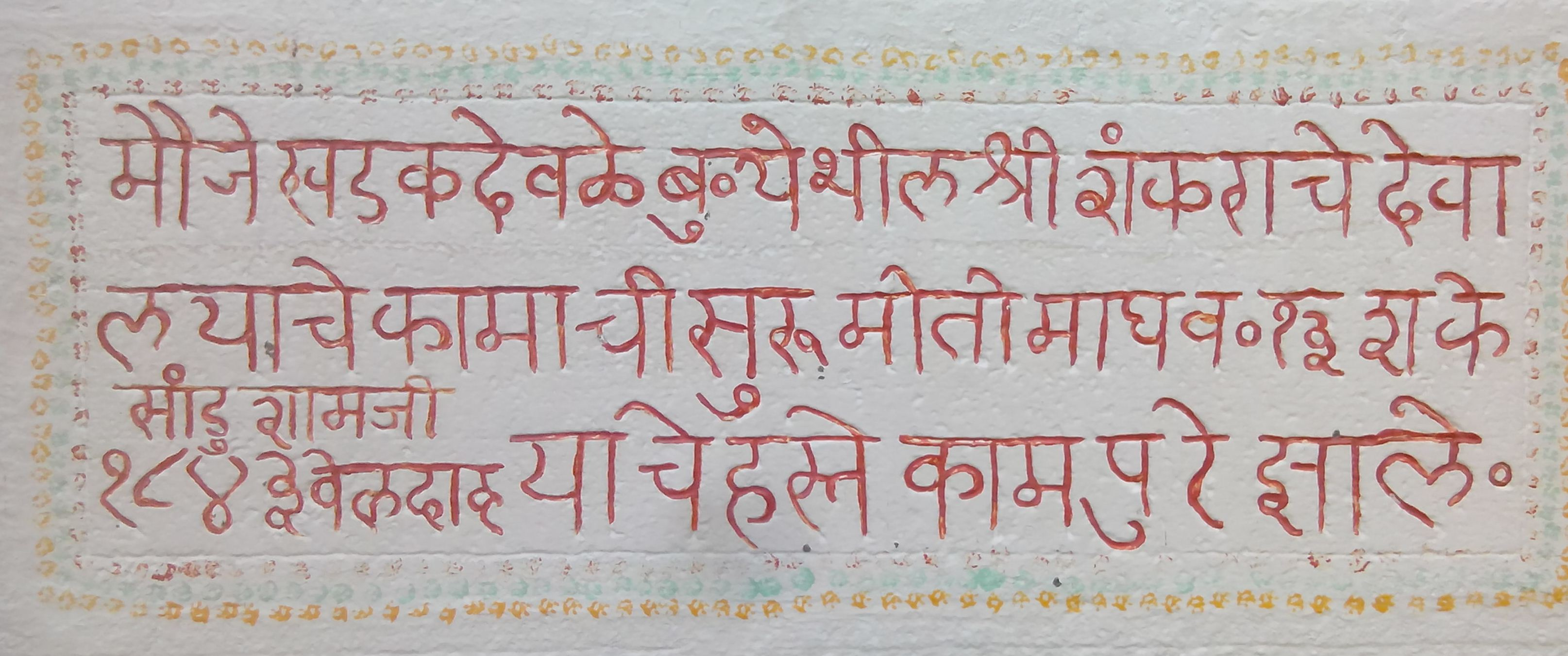
Khadakdeola Mahadeo Temple info

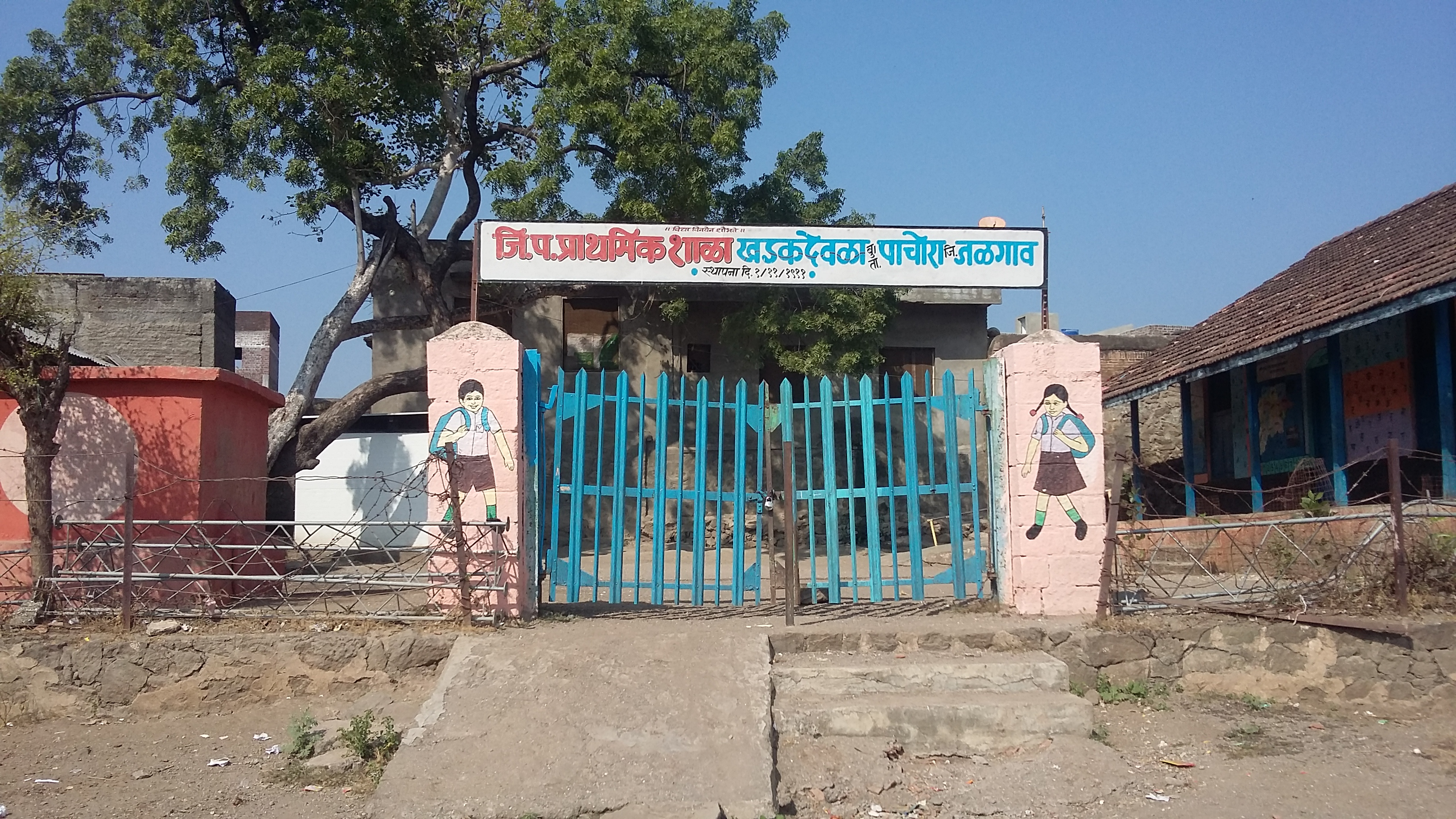
Khadakdeola ZP School

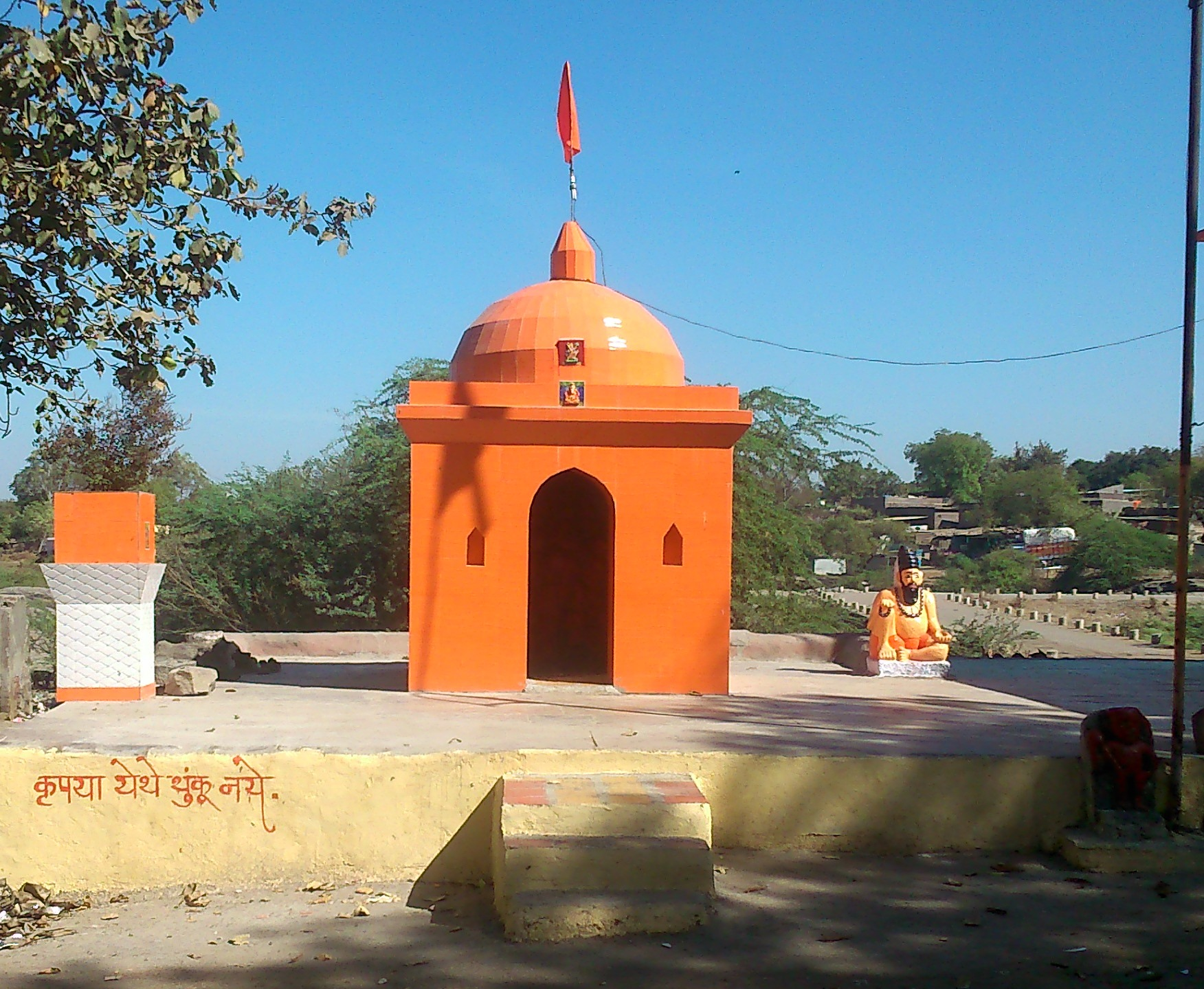
Hanuman Temple, Khadakdeola

== Medical facilities ==
Khadakdeola has a Primary Health Center (PHC) managed by Government. Most of the people go to PHC for basic treatment of common diseases and vaccination of their children.
