= Shendurni =

Pilgrimage city in Maharashtra, India

Shendurni is a pilgrimage city on the banks of the Sone river in Jamner Taluka of Jalgaon district of Maharashtra, India. As per the constitution of India and the Panchyati Raaj Act, Shendurni village was administrated by Sarpanch (Head of Village) who is elected representative of village but currently it has been modified by nagar panchayat (Municipal Council) first elected Nagaradhyksha (Mayor of Town) at year 2016.

== Education ==
Shendurni is also known as an educational hub and describes its history and journey:

- The journey of the Shendurni Secondary Education Co-operative Society began in 1944.

The establishment of various institutions of the Shendurni Secondary Education Co-operative Society (SSECS) was made possible by the efforts of the Late. Shri. Appasaheb R. B. Garud, the Late. Shri. Rajmal Lakhichand Lalwani, the Late. Dr. Kakasaheb N. G. Sane, the Late. Acharya Shri. Bapusaheb Gajananrao Garud and the Late. Shri. Bhaskarrao Khanderao Garud. They were known for their practical, hands-on approach and this has helped the next generation to develop within the SSECS.

Garud College is a part of the SSECS and was established with the aim of promoting international understanding via quality rural education. The SSECS has formulated plans to initiate a number of future institutions. The SSECS's new Chairman, Shri. Sanjay Bhaskar Garud has a young and dynamic personality and unparalleled vision. Today SSECS is an educational institution in North Maharashtra, occupying 100+ acres of land with thousands of buildings and facilities, with infrastructure comparative to global standards.

The SSECS was started with the mandate: "serve the needs of the common people and societies in the rural area of Jalgaon District. It is a registered organization, Registration No. E-84-EK dated 23 June 1955, under the Mumbai Public Charity Act - 1950. From 1944 to the present day, the SSECS has been providing services in the areas of education, medical relief, religion and cultural and social projects to various sectors and communities in rural areas.

Network of Institutions of SSECS: • Aacharya G.R. Garud Madhyamik Vidyalay, Shendurni • Shrimati K.D. Naik Madhyamik Vidyalay, Paldhi • Annaso B.K. Garud Madhyamik Vidyalay, Vakadi • Shrimati. P.D. Badola Madhyamik Vidyalay, Varkhedi • Dr. J. J. Pandit Madhyamik Vidyalay, Lohara • Aappaso P.S. Patil Madhyamik Vidyalay, Nandra • New English School, Betawad, Budruk • Bhauso B.O. Patil Madhyamik Vidyalay, Tarkheda • Pratap Madhyamik Vidyalay, Vadgaon • Smt. A.K. Patil Madhyamik Vidyalay, Mangrul • Ranidanji Jain Madhyamik Vidyalay, Vakod • Vikas Madhyamik Vidyalay, Ganpur • N.P. Patil Madhyamik Vidyalay, Palaskhede • Smt. R.S. Jain Madhyamik Vidyalay, Tondapur • Padmalay Madhyamik Vidyalay, Vitner • Aacharya G.R. Garud Jr. College, Shendurni • Aappasaheb R. B. Garud Arts, Commerce & Science College, Shendurni • Ranidanji Jain Jr. College, Vakod

1. Aappasaheb R. B. Garud Arts, Commerce & Science College, Shendurni

Established in 1971, by the Shendurni Secondary Education Co-operative Society (SSECS). The Appasaheb Raghunathrao Bhaurao (ARB) Garud College is affiliated with the North Maharashtra University Jalgaon (NMUJ) and is re-accredited with B Grade CGP 2.58. The NACC, Bangalore. College is certified with ISO 2009-2008 and the NMUJ awarded an "A" Grade in Academic Audit, the NACC College aims to impart education and higher achievements in remote, small settlements, e.g. the Shendurni in Jalgaon District. The NACC College is fully equipped with a Junior and Senior College for Arts, Commerce, and Science faculty and provides education streams for years 11, 12 and both the Final Year and Tertiary Year. The NACC College is fully equipped with both indoor and outdoor stadiums. The NACC college focuses on providing skill-based education to ICT students.

== Geography ==
Shendurni is located at 20°39'00" North and 75°35'00" East.

== History and religious importance ==
Shendurni belonged to Tatyasaheb Dikshit, the family priest of Baji Rao II, the last of the Peshwas. The Dikshits were the first family in whose favor Baji Rao spoke to John Malcolm, and Shendurni was granted to them instead of Dalehkhand in Hindustan. This was during John Malcolm's tenure in office 1 November 1827 – 1 December 1830. Around 1200 CC, the founder of Mahanubhav Panth, Shri Chakradhar Swami, arrived in the city and stayed at the old Gopal Krishna Temple for 21 days. Today, this temple is known as the "Shri Datta Mandir Sansthan" temple, which is located in the middle of the city. Another temple, known as "Vandeon," is situated outside the village, and its name originated from the forest area. Outside of the town to the south, with a well fifteen feet by twelve and a broad flight of steps leading to the stream, is an old Hemadpanti temple sacred to Mahadev. The hall, forty-two feet by thirty, is built of long blocks of solid stone, and the roof is supported by stone pillars. Connected with the temple are about twenty minor shrines, some of them with curious carving. In the middle of the town, in an earthen cave, is an image of the god, Trivikram, in whose honor a yearly fair is held. According to local tradition, the god Trivikram, appearing to him in his sleep, implored Kadoba Buva Maharaj Teli, a famous local saint, to release him from his earthen prison. Kadoba Buva Maharaj began to dig in the market-place, found the image, and set it in the place where the temple now stands. In addition to this Shendurni was place where attempt to avoid Udaybhan Rathod reach Kondhana took place in leadership of Subhedar Tanaji Malusare.

== See also ==
- Shendurni Municipal Council
- Jamner Vidhansabha Constituency
- Jamner Municipal Council
