= Nagardeole Budruk =

Coordinates: 20.564°N 75.208°E

Nagardeola Budruk is a village in Pachora tehsil of Jalgaon district in the Maharashtra state, India.

== Demographics ==
Nagardeola is one of the largest villages in the Jalgaon district. At the 2011 census, Nagardeola had a population of 14,229 in 2,872 households: 7,433 males and 6,796 females.

Nagardeola Village Website - https://nagardeola.vercel.app/
