= Hivra Dam =

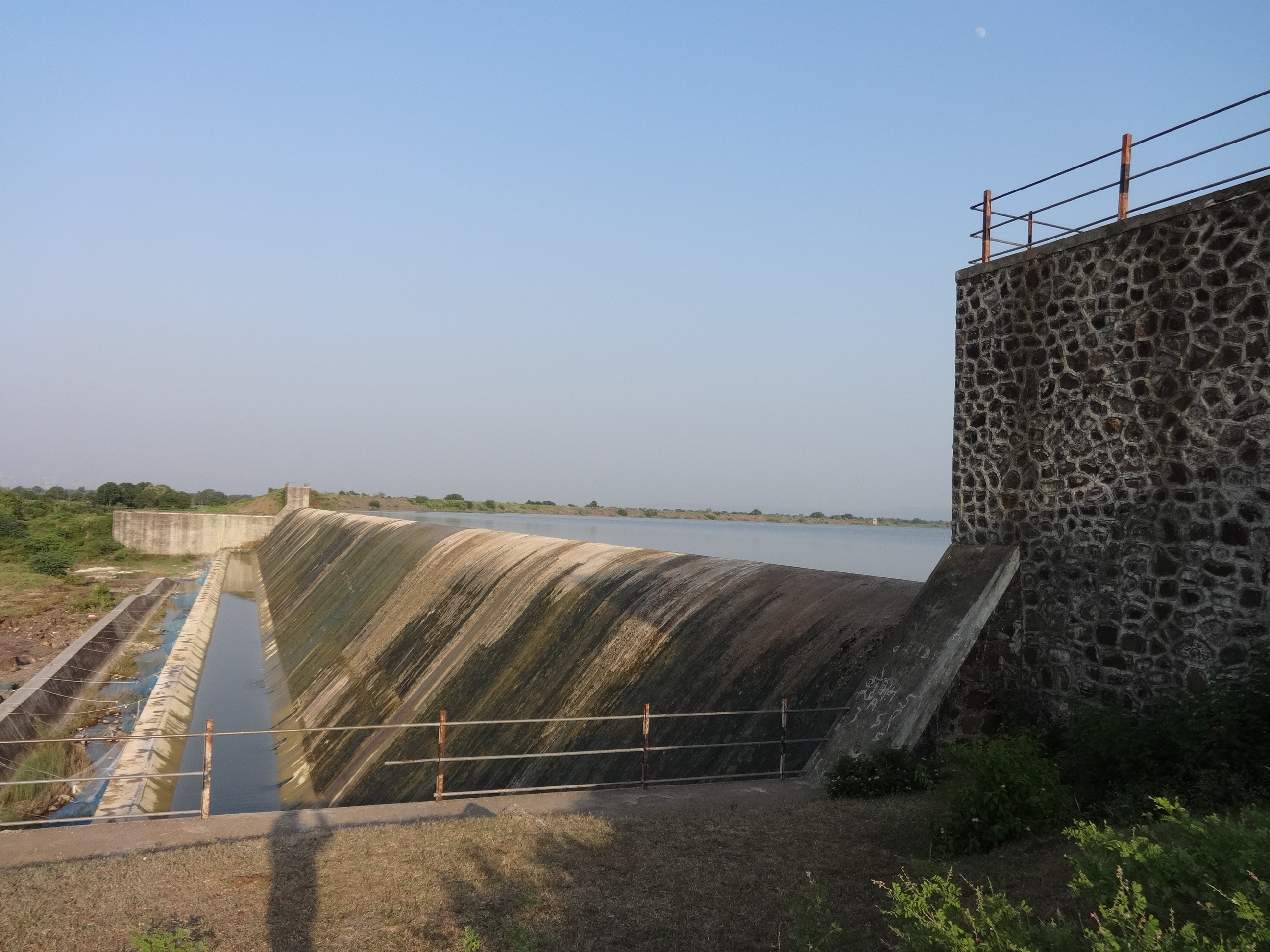
- Hivra Dam Khadakdeola

- Location within India
- Interactive map of Hivra Dam
- Official name: Hivra Dam
- Location: Khadakdeola Pachora, Maharashtra; India
- Coordinates: 20°35′53.9″N 75°21′20.18″E
- Construction began: 1977
- Opening date: 1994
- Construction cost: 16.98 Crore
- Owner: Government of Maharashtra

Dam and spillways
- Type of dam: Earthfill
- Impounds: Hivra River
- Height: 15.21 m (49.9 ft)
- Length: 3,860 m (12,660 ft)
- Spillway capacity: 2,591 m^{3}/s (91,500 cu ft/s)

Reservoir
- Creates: Hivra Reservoir
- Total capacity: 9.601 MLT

Power Station
- Operator: Government of Maharashtra
- Installed capacity: 12.77 MLT

The Hivra Dam, also known as Hivara Dam or Hirawa Dam, is an earthfill dam on the Hivra River about 6 km (3.7 mi) south of Pachora, Jalgaon district in state of Maharashtra in India. It is near the village of Khadakdeola. It is one of the main sources of water for Pachora and nearby villages. It also supplies water for irrigation in the area. The dam was completed in 1994.

== Water usage ==
The project irrigates annually an area of 4,204 hectares in nearby villages. It also provides drinking water to Tarkheda, Jargaon and Pachora city.

Location	Pachora
Year of completion	1994
Estimated cost of project	162,898,000
Height of dam sanctioned (metres)	15.21
Canal sanctioned length (Km)	12 KM
Maximum capacity (million cubic metres)	12.77
Irrigated area in the year (hectares)	4204
Usage of water for drinking purposes (million cubic metres)	1.13
Usage of water for agricultural purposes (million cubic metres)	7.74

== See also ==
- Dams in Maharashtra
- List of reservoirs and dams in India
