= Tatyasaheb R.O. Patil =

Indian politician (1950–2019)

Raghunath Omkar Patil
- Tatyasaheb R.O. Patil

Member of the Legislative Assembly (MLA)
- In office 1999–2009
- Preceded by: Wagh Onkar Narayan
- Succeeded by: Dilip Wagh
- Constituency: Pachora

Personal details
- Born: 20 October 1950 Pachora, Maharashtra, India
- Died: 28 March 2019 (aged 68) Mumbai, Maharashtra, India
- Children: Vaishali Patil - Suryawanshi

Raghunath Omkar Patil (20 October 1950 – 28 March 2019), popularly known as R. O. Tatyasaheb, was an Indian politician from Maharashtra. He was a two-term Member of the Legislative Assembly (MLA) from the Pachora constituency in Jalgaon district, Maharashtra. R. O. Patil was elected to the Pachora assembly constituency for two successive terms on a Shiv Sena ticket. He made a lasting impact on the political history of the constituency by being elected for two consecutive terms and significantly improved the constituency through multiple development works.

== Personal life and career ==
R.O. Patil, born in a farmer's family at Anturli in Pachora taluka. He was able to accomplish remarkable feats in the realms of business, industry, education, and social and political affairs despite facing hard times. R. O. Patil's fantastic life journey has many facets, ranging from progressive farmer and agricultural centre operator to successful entrepreneur and ideal politician. After obtaining his secondary education at Pachora, he went on to earn a B.Sc. Agri. degree at Dhule. R. O. Patil began his career as a teacher in Umberkhed. However, he soon followed his passion for agriculture and opened Adarsh Krishi Seva Kendra and Ganga Agro in Pachora. On March 2, 1988, he opened Nirmal Seeds, a seed production company. In 1999, after working in the education, social, and seed industries, R. O. Patil transitioned to politics. Under the guidance of the late Balasaheb Thackeray and current Shiv Sena party leader Uddhav Thackeray, the Shiv Sena party gained a strong foothold in the Pachora constituency.
