= Girish Mahajan =

Indian politician from Jalgaon, Maharashtra

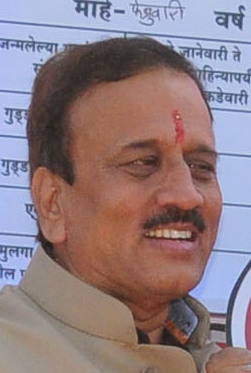

Minister of Water Resources (Vidharbha, Tapi, Konkan) Government of Maharashtra
- Incumbent
- Assumed office 15 December 2024
- Chief Minister: Devendra Fadnavis

Minister of Tourism Government of Maharashtra
- In office 14 July 2023 – 26 November 2024
- Chief Minister: Eknath Shinde
- Preceded by: Mangal Lodha
- Succeeded by: Shambhuraj Desai

Minister of Medical Education Government of Maharashtra
- In office 9 August 2022 – 14 July 2023
- Chief Minister: Eknath Shinde
- Preceded by: Amit Deshmukh
- Succeeded by: Hasan Mushrif
- In office 8 July 2016 – 8 November 2019
- Chief Minister: Devendra Fadnavis
- Preceded by: Vinod Tawde
- Succeeded by: Amit Deshmukh

Minister of Rural Development Government of Maharashtra
- In office 9 August 2022 – 26 November 2024
- Chief Minister: Eknath Shinde
- Preceded by: Hasan Mushrif
- Succeeded by: Jaykumar Gore

Minister of Water Resources Government of Maharashtra
- In office 5 December 2014 – 8 November 2019
- Chief Minister: Devendra Fadnavis
- Preceded by: Sunil Tatkare
- Succeeded by: Jayant Patil

Member of Maharashtra Legislative Assembly
- Incumbent
- Assumed office 1995
- Preceded by: Dattatray Mahajan
- Constituency: Jamner

Personal details
- Born: 17 May 1960 (age 66) Jamner, Maharashtra, India
- Party: Bharatiya Janata Party
- Spouse: Sadhana Mahajan
- Parent: Dattatray Mahajan (father)

Girish Dattatray Mahajan is a politician from the Jalgaon district of Maharashtra. He is the current MLA of Jamner taluka, representing the Jamner Vidhan Sabha Constituency in the Maharashtra Legislative Assembly. He is a senior leader of the Bharatiya Janata Party. Girish Mahajan is cabinet minister for Water Resources (Tapi, Vidarbha, and Konkan), Kumbh Mela, and Disaster Management of Maharashtra State. He is also the guardian minister of Nashik.

In 2014, when BJP formed a government in Maharashtra following the Assembly Election, in CM Devendra Fadnavis's cabinet, he served as Minister of Water Resources and Minister of Medical Education of Maharashtra at separate times.

== Early life ==
Mahajan was born in Jamner into a Marathi Gujjar Patil family.

== Career ==
As a college student, Mahajan was an active member of ABVP as of 1978. In the ABVP, he started as a grassroots worker where he painted walls and distributed promotional posters for politicians. He was appointed Taluka President of ABVP.

Mahajan's political career commenced in earnest in the early eighties, when he became Taluka President of the Bharatiya Janata Yuva Morcha (youth wing of the BJP) in Maharashtra.

In 1992, Mahajan was elected in a Gram-Panchayat election for Jamner. In 1995 he was elected to the Maharashtra Legislative Assembly for the first time. He is serving his 7th term as an MLA as of 2024 Election Result. Mahajan was sworn in as the Minister of Water Resources of Maharashtra on 31 October 2014. His government won a confidence motion by oral vote on 12 November 2014, allowing it to continue to govern.

As of 29 August 2023, he is serving as the Minister of Rural Development of the state in CM Eknath Shinde's cabinet.

== Positions held ==
=== Ministerial ===
| Portfolio | Tenure | |
|---|---|---|
| Minister of Rural Development | 9-Aug-2022 | 26 November 2024 |
| Minister of Youth Affairs & Sports | 9-Aug-2022 | 14 July 2023 |
| Minister of Medical Education | 9-Aug-2022 | 2 July 2023 |
| Minister of Medical Education | 10-Jul-2016 | 8-Nov-2019 |
| Minister of Water Resources | 5-Dec-2014 | 8-Nov-2019 |

=== Legislative ===
| Office | Constituency | Tenure | |
|---|---|---|---|
| Member Of Maharashtra Legislative Assembly | Jamner | 2024 | Present |
| Member Of Maharashtra Legislative Assembly | Jamner | 2019 | 2024 |
| Member Of Maharashtra Legislative Assembly | Jamner | 2014 | 2019 |
| Member Of Maharashtra Legislative Assembly | Jamner | 2009 | 2014 |
| Member Of Maharashtra Legislative Assembly | Jamner | 2004 | 2009 |
| Member Of Maharashtra Legislative Assembly | Jamner | 1999 | 2004 |
| Member Of Maharashtra Legislative Assembly | Jamner | 1995 | 1999 |

=== Within BJP ===
- President, BJYM Jamner Taluka (1988-1990).
- Vice President, BJP Maharashtra (1993-1995).
- District Chairman, BJP, Jalgaon (2006).
- Party Pratod. BJP Legislature Party, Maharashtra State (2008).
- Region Vice President, BJP, Maharashtra Pradesh (2011).

== See also ==
- Girish Mahajan Website
- Jamner
- Jamner Railway Station
- Jamner Vidhan Sabha Constituency

Political offices https://cmo.maharashtra.gov.in/en/governor-and-cabinet-ministers
| Preceded by Ajit Pawar | Cabinet Minister for Water Resources, Maharashtra State; December 2014–present | Incumbent |
| Preceded by Chhagan Bhujbal | Maharashtra State Guardian Minister for Nashik district December 2014–present | Incumbent |
| Preceded by Vijaykumar Gavit | Maharashtra State Guardian Minister for Nandurbar district December 2014–present | Incumbent |
