= Shendurni Municipal Council =

Type
- Type: Municipal Council of the Shendurni

History
- Founded: 15-Jun-2016

Leadership
- Mayor: Vijaya Khalse, Bharatiya Janata Party
- Seats: 18

Elections
- Last election: 09-December-2018

Website
- http://shendurninp.org

Shendurni is the Municipal council in district of Jalgaon, Maharashtra.

== History ==
The Shendurni municipal council established on 15-Jun-2016.

== Municipal Council election ==
=== Electoral performance 2025 ===
S.No.	Party name	Alliance	Party flag or symbol	Number of Corporators
01	Shiv Sena (SS)	NDA		00
02	Bharatiya Janata Party (BJP)	NDA		14
03	Indian National Congress (INC)	UPA		01
04	Nationalist Congress Party (NCP)	UPA		03
05	Communist Party of India (CPI)			00
