= Pimpalgaon Bk. =

Coordinates: 20.580°N 75.488°E

Pimpalgaon. is a village in Pachora tehsil of Jalgaon district in Maharashtra state, India.

== Demographics ==
Pimpalgaon is one of the largest village in Jalgaon district. As per 2011 Census of India, Pimpalgaon has 3230 household with population of 14,918 people of which 7,733 are males, while 7,185 are females.
