= Deulgaon Gujari =

Village in Maharashtra

Deulgaon Deulgaon Gujari
- Village
- Location in Maharashtra Deulgaon (India)
- Country: India
- State: Maharashtra
- District: Jalgaon

Government
  - Type: Grampanchayat
- Elevation: 264 m (866 ft)

Population (2011)
  - Total: 4,121

Languages
  - Official: Marathi
- Time zone: UTC+5:30 (IST)
- Telephone code: 02580
- Vehicle registration: MH-19

Deulgaon, commonly known as Deulgaon Gujari, is a village located in Jamner taluka of Jalgaon district, in state of Maharashtra.

== Demographics ==
As per 2011 census:

- Deulgaon Gujari has 913 families residing. The village has population of 4121.
- Out of the population of 4121, 2110 are males while 2011 are females.
- Literacy rate of the village is 68.32%.
- Average sex ratio of the village is 953 females to 1000 males. Average sex ratio of Maharashtra state is 929.

== Geography, and transport ==
Distance between Deulgaon Gujari, and district headquarter Jalgaon is 70 kilometres (43 mi).
