= Pachora Assembly constituency =

Constituency of the Maharashtra legislative assembly in India

Coordinates: 20.66°N 75.35°E

Pachora
- Constituency No. 18 for the Maharashtra Legislative Assembly

Constituency details
- Country: India
- Region: Western India
- State: Maharashtra
- District: Jalgaon
- Lok Sabha constituency: Jalgaon
- Established: 1952
- Total electors: 335,848
- Reservation: None

Member of Legislative Assembly
- 15th Maharashtra Legislative Assembly
- Incumbent Kishor Appa Patil
- Party: SHS
- Alliance: NDA
- Elected year: 2024

Pachora Assembly constituency is one of the 288 Vidhan Sabha constituencies of Maharashtra state in western India. The constituency is located in Jalgaon district.

== Overview ==
It is part of Jalgaon Lok Sabha constituency along with another five Vidhan Sabha constituencies of this district, namely Jalgaon City, Jalgaon Rural, Erandol, Amalner and Chalisgaon.

== Members of the Legislative Assembly ==
Election	Member	Party
1952	Patil Julalsing Shankarrao	Indian National Congress
1957	Onkar Narayan Wagh	Praja Socialist Party
1962	Supadu Bhadu Patil	Indian National Congress
1967	Supadu Bhadu Patil	Indian National Congress
1972	Krishnarao Maharu Patil	Indian National Congress
1978	Onkar Narayan Wagh	Janata Party
1980	Krishnarao Maharu Patil	Indian National Congress (I)
1985	Onkar Narayan Wagh	Janata Party
1990	Krishnarao Maharu Patil	Indian National Congress
1995	Onkar Narayan Wagh	Maharashtra Vikas Congress
1999	Tatyasaheb R.O. Patil	Shiv Sena
2004	Tatyasaheb R.O. Patil	Shiv Sena
2009	Dilip Onkar Wagh	Nationalist Congress Party
2014	Kishor Appa Patil	Shiv Sena
2019	Kishor Appa Patil	Shiv Sena
2024	Kishor Appa Patil	Shiv Sena

== Election results ==
=== Assembly Election 2024 ===
2024 Maharashtra Legislative Assembly election : Pachora
Party	Candidate	Votes	%	±%
SS	Kishor Appa Patil	97,366	42.33%	▲4.42
SS(UBT)	Vaishalitai Narendrasing Suryawanshi	58,677	25.51%	New
Independent	Amol Panditrao Shinde	58,071	25.25%	New
Maharashtra Swarajya Party	Nanasaheb Pratap Hari Patil	5,688	2.47%	New
Independent	Dilip Onkar Wagh	5,259	2.29%	New
NOTA	None of the above	1,911	0.83%	▼0.03
Margin of victory		38,689	16.82%	▲15.78
Turnout		231,916	69.05%	▲5.12
Total valid votes		230,005		
Registered electors		335,848		▲6.47
SS hold		Swing	▲4.42	

=== Assembly Election 2019 ===
2019 Maharashtra Legislative Assembly election : Pachora
Party	Candidate	Votes	%	±%
SS	Kishor Appa Patil	75,699	37.91%	▼8.55
Independent	Amol Panditrao Shinde	73,615	36.86%	New
NCP	Dilip Onkar Wagh	44,961	22.52%	▼8.86
VBA	Naresh Pandit Patil	3,214	1.61%	New
NOTA	None of the above	1,724	0.86%	▲0.18
Margin of victory		2,084	1.04%	▼14.04
Turnout		201,654	63.93%	▼1.98
Total valid votes		199,693		
Registered electors		315,444		▲9.60
SS hold		Swing	▼8.55	

=== Assembly Election 2014 ===
2014 Maharashtra Legislative Assembly election : Pachora
Party	Candidate	Votes	%	±%
SS	Kishor Appa Patil	87,520	46.46%	▲1.28
NCP	Dilip Onkar Wagh	59,117	31.38%	▼17.62
BJP	Uttamrao Dhana Mahajan	20,772	11.03%	New
MNS	Bhausaheb Dilip Mukundrao Patil	12,833	6.81%	New
INC	Pradiprao Gulabrao Pawar	4,904	2.60%	New
NOTA	None of the above	1,272	0.68%	New
Margin of victory		28,403	15.08%	▲11.26
Turnout		189,692	65.91%	▲1.42
Total valid votes		188,372		
Registered electors		287,812		▲14.07
SS gain from NCP		Swing	▼2.54	

=== Assembly Election 2009 ===
2009 Maharashtra Legislative Assembly election : Pachora
Party	Candidate	Votes	%	±%
NCP	Dilip Onkar Wagh	79,715	49.00%	▲7.82
SS	Tatyasaheb R.O. Patil	73,501	45.18%	▼7.17
Independent	Sunil Ramkrishna Patil	2,603	1.60%	New
RPI(A)	Mahajan Eknath Garbad	2,270	1.40%	New
Independent	Shaikh Rasul Usman	1,297	0.80%	New
Independent	Patil Abhay Sharad	1,031	0.63%	New
Margin of victory		6,214	3.82%	▼7.35
Turnout		162,718	64.49%	▼4.85
Total valid votes		162,670		
Registered electors		252,303		▲20.71
NCP gain from SS		Swing	▼3.35	

=== Assembly Election 2004 ===
2004 Maharashtra Legislative Assembly election : Pachora
Party	Candidate	Votes	%	±%
SS	Tatyasaheb R.O. Patil	75,862	52.35%	▲9.37
NCP	Dilip Onkar Wagh	59,674	41.18%	▲29.24
BSP	Vinod Namdeo Ahire	2,413	1.67%	New
SP	Patil Sahebrao Gajmal	2,413	1.67%	New
Independent	Brahmane Bhalchandra Pandurang	1,693	1.17%	New
Independent	Chitodi Shersingh Babulal	1,580	1.09%	New
RPI	Bramhane Ratan Zuba	1,284	0.89%	New
Margin of victory		16,188	11.17%	▼4.46
Turnout		144,928	69.34%	▲5.82
Total valid votes		144,919		
Registered electors		209,013		▲12.90
SS hold		Swing	▲9.37	

=== Assembly Election 1999 ===
1999 Maharashtra Legislative Assembly election : Pachora
Party	Candidate	Votes	%	±%
SS	Tatyasaheb R.O. Patil	46,335	42.98%	▲23.18
Maharashtra Vikas Congres	Onkar Narayan Wagh	29,491	27.36%	▲3.92
INC	Bhausaheb alias Dilip Mukundrao Patil	14,453	13.41%	▼6.74
NCP	Shinde Pandit Parashram	12,872	11.94%	New
Independent	Patil Sarala Kiran	3,977	3.69%	New
Margin of victory		16,844	15.63%	▲12.35
Turnout		117,597	63.52%	▼11.38
Total valid votes		107,800		
Registered electors		185,126		▲2.98
SS gain from Maharashtra Vikas Congres		Swing	▲19.54	

=== Assembly Election 1995 ===
1995 Maharashtra Legislative Assembly election : Pachora
Party	Candidate	Votes	%	±%
Maharashtra Vikas Congres	Onkar Narayan Wagh	30,656	23.44%	New
INC	Deshmukh Anil Ramrao	26,359	20.15%	▼15.06
SS	Ashok Mahadeo Misal	25,903	19.80%	▼6.49
Independent	Pawar Krishnarao Shivarao	21,320	16.30%	New
JD	Deshmukh Khalil Dadamiya	9,335	7.14%	▼28.05
BBM	Tatyasaheb R.O. Patil	7,643	5.84%	New
Hindustan Janta Party	Ingale Vasant Damu	3,554	2.72%	New
Independent	Sharad Tryambak Patil	2,040	1.56%	New
Margin of victory		4,297	3.28%	▲3.26
Turnout		134,651	74.90%	▲14.32
Total valid votes		130,811		
Registered electors		179,765		▲8.75
Maharashtra Vikas Congres gain from INC		Swing	▼11.77	

=== Assembly Election 1990 ===
1990 Maharashtra Legislative Assembly election : Pachora
Party	Candidate	Votes	%	±%
INC	Krishnarao Maharu Patil	34,565	35.21%	▼3.39
JD	Onkar Narayan Wagh	34,542	35.19%	New
SS	Ashok Mahadeo Misal	25,807	26.29%	New
Independent	Patil Yadavrao Daulatrao	1,687	1.72%	New
Margin of victory		23	0.02%	▼16.75
Turnout		100,147	60.58%	▼3.01
Total valid votes		98,169		
Registered electors		165,306		▲24.08
INC gain from JP		Swing	▼20.17	

=== Assembly Election 1985 ===
1985 Maharashtra Legislative Assembly election : Pachora
Party	Candidate	Votes	%	±%
JP	Onkar Narayan Wagh	45,855	55.38%	New
INC	Krishnarao Maharu Patil	31,965	38.60%	New
Independent	Bagwan Nisar Ibrahim	3,498	4.22%	New
Independent	Patil Sharad Shmrao	1,201	1.45%	New
Margin of victory		13,890	16.77%	▲0.87
Turnout		84,715	63.59%	▲3.89
Total valid votes		82,803		
Registered electors		133,222		▲10.88
JP gain from INC(I)		Swing	▲1.67	

=== Assembly Election 1980 ===
1980 Maharashtra Legislative Assembly election : Pachora
Party	Candidate	Votes	%	±%
INC(I)	Krishnarao Maharu Patil	37,601	53.71%	New
JP	Onkar Narayan Wagh	26,470	37.81%	New
Independent	Shaikh Jomail Shaikh Fakira	5,932	8.47%	New
Margin of victory		11,131	15.90%	▲5.32
Turnout		71,728	59.70%	▼13.29
Total valid votes		70,003		
Registered electors		120,148		▲8.69
INC(I) gain from JP		Swing	▼1.58	

=== Assembly Election 1978 ===
1978 Maharashtra Legislative Assembly election : Pachora
Party	Candidate	Votes	%	±%
JP	Onkar Narayan Wagh	43,130	55.29%	New
INC	Krishnarao Maharu Patil	34,878	44.71%	▼24.78
Margin of victory		8,252	10.58%	▼33.46
Turnout		80,681	72.99%	▲14.49
Total valid votes		78,008		
Registered electors		110,538		▲18.54
JP gain from INC		Swing	▼14.20	

=== Assembly Election 1972 ===
1972 Maharashtra Legislative Assembly election : Pachora
Party	Candidate	Votes	%	±%
INC	Krishnarao Maharu Patil	36,360	69.49%	▲21.54
SSP	Sharad Tryambak Patil	13,315	25.45%	New
INC(O)	Nanabhau Jangalrao Pawar	1,971	3.77%	New
ABJS	Zalte Shalik Koutik	676	1.29%	New
Margin of victory		23,045	44.04%	▲38.83
Turnout		54,552	58.50%	▼5.04
Total valid votes		52,322		
Registered electors		93,253		▲11.31
INC hold		Swing	▲21.54	

=== Assembly Election 1967 ===
1967 Maharashtra Legislative Assembly election : Pachora
Party	Candidate	Votes	%	±%
INC	Supadu Bhadu Patil	23,668	47.95%	▼16.65
SSP	Onkar Narayan Wagh	21,097	42.74%	New
PSP	S. T. Patil	4,597	9.31%	▼17.01
Margin of victory		2,571	5.21%	▼33.08
Turnout		53,230	63.54%	▲1.03
Total valid votes		49,362		
Registered electors		83,777		▲17.09
INC hold		Swing	▼16.65	

=== Assembly Election 1962 ===
1962 Maharashtra Legislative Assembly election : Pachora
Party	Candidate	Votes	%	±%
INC	Supadu Bhadu Patil	26,413	64.60%	▲22.58
PSP	Onkar Narayan Wagh	10,759	26.32%	▼31.66
PWPI	Laxamanrao Shankarrao Adhav	3,712	9.08%	New
Margin of victory		15,654	38.29%	▲22.32
Turnout		44,728	62.51%	▲2.62
Total valid votes		40,884		
Registered electors		71,549		▲10.88
INC gain from PSP		Swing	▲6.62	

=== Assembly Election 1957 ===
1957 Bombay State Legislative Assembly election : Pachora
Party	Candidate	Votes	%	±%
PSP	Onkar Narayan Wagh	22,408	57.98%	New
INC	Krishnarao Maharu Patil	16,237	42.02%	▼20.08
Margin of victory		6,171	15.97%	▼26.44
Turnout		38,645	59.89%	▲3.40
Total valid votes		38,645		
Registered electors		64,531		▲22.10
PSP gain from INC		Swing	▼4.12	

=== Assembly Election 1952 ===
1952 Bombay State Legislative Assembly election : Pachora
Party	Candidate	Votes	%	±%
INC	Patil Julalsing Shankarrao	18,541	62.10%	New
Socialist	Patil Shankar Devchand	5,878	19.69%	New
Kamgar Kisan Paksha	Adhav Shankarrao Bhikaji	5,439	18.22%	New
Margin of victory		12,663	42.41%	
Turnout		29,858	56.49%	
Total valid votes		29,858		
Registered electors		52,853		
INC win (new seat)				

== See also ==
- Pachora
- Pachora Municipal Council
- List of constituencies of the Maharashtra Legislative Assembly
