= Hivra River =

Coordinates: 20°44′N 75°22′E

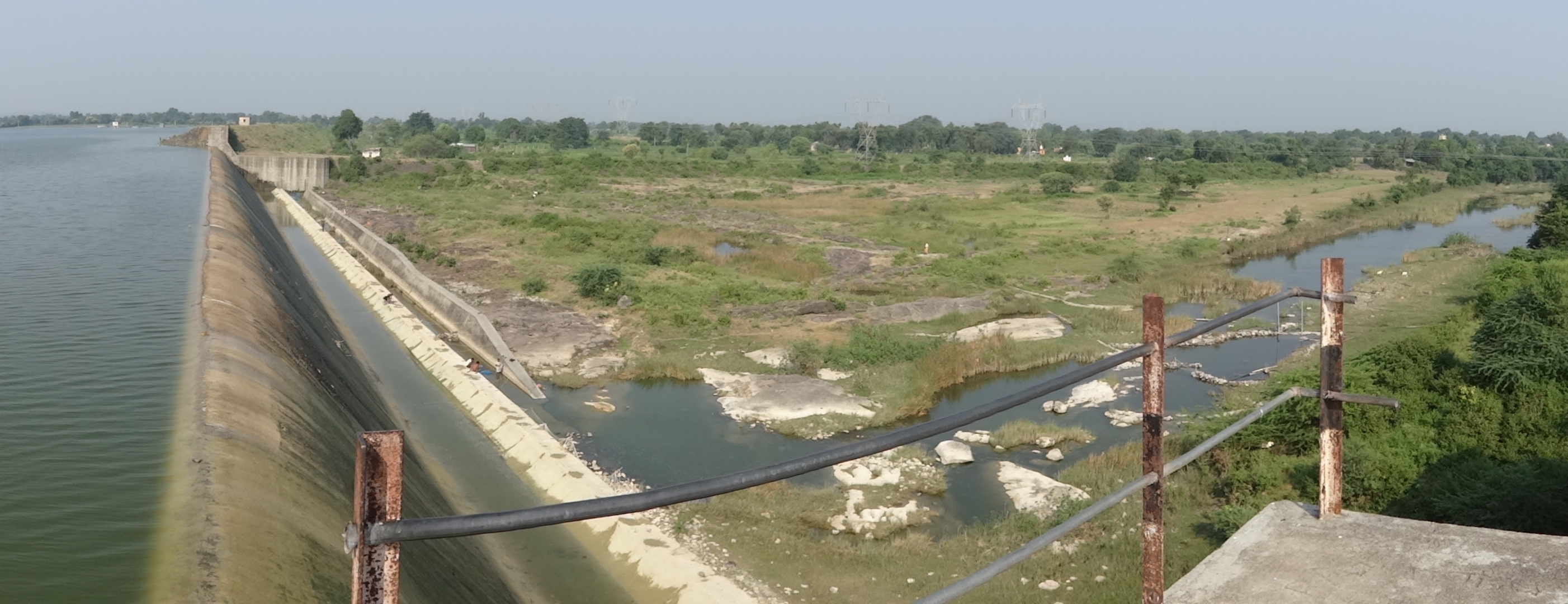
- Hivra Dam & Hivra River Basin
- Native name: हिवरा नदी (Marathi)

Location
- Country: India
- Region: Khandesh, Aurangabad District

Physical characteristics
- Source
  - location: Ghatnandra Ghats
  - elevation: 261 m (856 ft)
- Mouth
  - location: Hivra River
- Length: 57 km (35 mi)

Basin features
- Landmarks: Khadakdeola, Maharashtra

The Hivra River (Marathi: हिवरा नदी) is a notable river crossing the town by Wadi, Banoti, Khadakdeola and Pachora in the Indian state of Maharashtra. The river originates from the Ghatnandra Hills, and flows a total of nearly 57 kilometres (35 mi).

Hivra River originates from Ghatnandra Hills in Maharashtra state in India and flows through Aurangabad and Jalgaon district. The Hivra River passes by Wadi, Banoti, Varthan, Ghorkund, Mhashikotha, Khadakdeola, Sarola, and Pachora.

== Irrigation ==
The government of Maharashtra has constructed a dam over the river known as the Hivra Dam which provides irrigation water to the neighbouring villages.

== Gallery ==
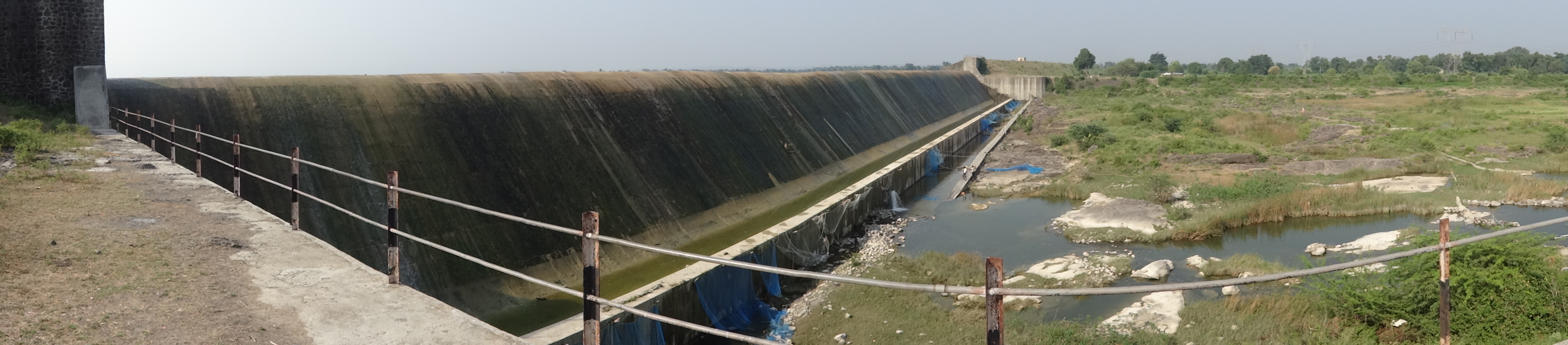
Hivra Dam

== See also ==
- Hivra Dam
- Khadakdeola
