= Jamner Assembly constituency =

Legislative constituency in Maharashtra, India

Coordinates: 20.81°N 75.78°E

Jamner
- Constituency No. 19 for the Maharashtra Legislative Assembly

Constituency details
- Country: India
- Region: Western India
- State: Maharashtra
- District: Jalgaon
- Lok Sabha constituency: Raver
- Established: 1957
- Total electors: 335,669
- Reservation: None

Member of Legislative Assembly
- 15th Maharashtra Legislative Assembly
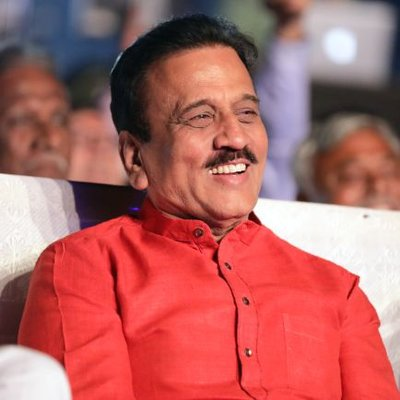
- Incumbent Girish Mahajan
- Party: BJP
- Alliance: NDA
- Elected year: 2024

Jamner Assembly constituency is one of the 288 Vidhan Sabha (Legislative Assembly) constituencies of Maharashtra state in western India. This constituency is located in the Jalgaon district.

== Overview ==
Jamner is part of the Raver Lok Sabha constituency along with five other Vidhan Sabha segments, namely Bhusawal, Chopda, Muktainagar and Raver in Jalgaon district and Malkapur in the adjoining Buldhana district.

== Members of the Legislative Assembly ==
Year	Member	Party
1957	Gajananrao Garud	Praja Socialist Party
1962	Abaji Nana Patil	Indian National Congress
1967	Abaji Nana Patil	Indian National Congress
1972	Narayan Kisan Patil	Independent
1978	Gajananrao Garud	Independent
1980	Ishwarlal Jain	Indian National Congress (U)
1985	Babusing Rathod	Indian National Congress
1990	Dattatray Mahajan	Indian National Congress
1995	Girish Mahajan	Bharatiya Janata Party
1999	Girish Mahajan	Bharatiya Janata Party
2004	Girish Mahajan	Bharatiya Janata Party
2009	Girish Mahajan	Bharatiya Janata Party
2014	Girish Mahajan	Bharatiya Janata Party
2019	Girish Mahajan	Bharatiya Janata Party
2024	Girish Mahajan	Bharatiya Janata Party

== Election results ==
=== Assembly Election 2024 ===
2024 Maharashtra Legislative Assembly election : Jamner
Party	Candidate	Votes	%	±%
BJP	Girish Dattatraya Mahajan	128,667	54.32%	▼1.18
NCP-SP	Khodape Dilip Baliram	1,01,782	42.97%	New
Independent	Dilip Motiram Khamankar	2,336	0.99%	New
NOTA	None of the Above	2,142	0.90%	▼0.11
Independent	Rahulroy Ashok Mule	2,095	0.88%	New
Margin of victory		26,885	11.35%	▼5.59
Turnout		2,38,994	71.20%	▲3.67
Total valid votes		2,36,852		
Registered electors		3,35,669		▲8.65
BJP hold		Swing	▼1.18	

=== Assembly Election 2019 ===
2019 Maharashtra Legislative Assembly election : Jamner
Party	Candidate	Votes	%	±%
BJP	Girish Dattatraya Mahajan	114,714	55.51%	▲1.81
NCP	Sanjay Bhaskarrao Garud	79,700	38.57%	▲3.43
VBA	Bhimrao Namdeo Chavan	6,471	3.13%	New
Rashtriya Jankranti Party	Vijay Jagan Tanvar	2,118	1.02%	New
NOTA	None of the Above	2,105	1.02%	▲0.09
MNS	Dr. Vijayanand Arun Kulkarni	1,439	0.70%	▼0.47
Margin of victory		35,014	16.94%	▼1.61
Turnout		2,08,888	67.61%	▼2.36
Total valid votes		2,06,660		
Registered electors		3,08,952		▲10.99
BJP hold		Swing	▲1.81	

=== Assembly Election 2014 ===
2014 Maharashtra Legislative Assembly election : Jamner
Party	Candidate	Votes	%	±%
BJP	Girish Dattatraya Mahajan	103,498	53.69%	▲3.52
NCP	Digambar Keshav Patil	67,730	35.14%	New
SS	Subhash Dagadu Tanwar	14,232	7.38%	New
INC	Vispute Jyotsna Sunil	2,691	1.40%	▼44.54
MNS	Rajput Vilas Dhansing	2,241	1.16%	New
NOTA	None of the Above	1,796	0.93%	New
Margin of victory		35,768	18.56%	▲14.32
Turnout		1,94,738	69.96%	▼2.33
Total valid votes		1,92,752		
Registered electors		2,78,356		▲12.27
BJP hold		Swing	▲3.52	

=== Assembly Election 2009 ===
2009 Maharashtra Legislative Assembly election : Jamner
Party	Candidate	Votes	%	±%
BJP	Girish Dattatraya Mahajan	89,040	50.17%	▲0.68
INC	Sanjay Bhaskarrao Garud	81,523	45.94%	New
Independent	Vilas Dhansing Rajput	3,412	1.92%	New
BSP	Narendrakumar Maganrao Khairnar	2,132	1.20%	▼0.05
Prabuddha Republican Party	Sunil Fakira Nikam	1,357	0.76%	New
Margin of victory		7,517	4.24%	▼15.97
Turnout		1,77,517	71.60%	▼1.09
Total valid votes		1,77,464		
Registered electors		2,47,939		▲24.19
BJP hold		Swing	▲0.68	

=== Assembly Election 2004 ===
2004 Maharashtra Legislative Assembly election : Jamner
Party	Candidate	Votes	%	±%
BJP	Girish Dattatraya Mahajan	71,813	49.50%	▲2.38
Independent	Sanjay Bhaskarrao Garud	42,500	29.29%	New
NCP	Subhash Champalal Bohra alish Raju Bohra	24,189	16.67%	▼17.97
Independent	Sahebrao Dashrath Rathod	3,080	2.12%	New
BSP	Shantaram Laxman Survade	1,812	1.25%	New
Margin of victory		29,313	20.20%	▲7.73
Turnout		1,45,081	72.67%	▲0.82
Total valid votes		1,45,081		
Registered electors		1,99,652		▲19.80
BJP hold		Swing	▲2.38	

=== Assembly Election 1999 ===
1999 Maharashtra Legislative Assembly election : Jamner
Party	Candidate	Votes	%	±%
BJP	Girish Dattatraya Mahajan	56,416	47.12%	▼5.16
NCP	Ishwarlal Shankarlal Jain	41,479	34.64%	New
INC	Dr. Suresh Mansaram Patil	21,375	17.85%	▼17.97
Margin of victory		14,937	12.48%	▼3.98
Turnout		1,25,564	75.34%	▼2.47
Total valid votes		1,19,735		
Registered electors		1,66,655		▲1.70
BJP hold		Swing	▼5.16	

=== Assembly Election 1995 ===
1995 Maharashtra Legislative Assembly election : Jamner
Party	Candidate	Votes	%	±%
BJP	Girish Dattatraya Mahajan	63,661	52.27%	New
INC	Ishwarlal Shankarlal Jain	43,624	35.82%	▲1.61
Independent	Dr.Manohar Gajmal Patil	7,298	5.99%	New
JD	Pandurang Eknath (P. E. Tatya)	1,874	1.54%	New
Independent	Patil Janardhan Tukaram	1,173	0.96%	New
Independent	Malutai Muralidhar Chaudhari	896	0.74%	New
Margin of victory		20,037	16.45%	▲12.57
Turnout		1,24,782	76.15%	▲11.58
Total valid votes		1,21,782		
Registered electors		1,63,866		▲11.54
BJP gain from INC		Swing	▲18.07	

=== Assembly Election 1990 ===
1990 Maharashtra Legislative Assembly election : Jamner
Party	Candidate	Votes	%	±%
INC	Dattatray Ughadu Mahajan	31,531	34.21%	▼14.43
INS(SCS)	Pralhadrao Eknathrao Patil	27,956	30.33%	New
SS	Manohar Gajamal Patil	26,219	28.44%	New
Independent	Babusing Dagadusing Rathod	5,032	5.46%	New
Margin of victory		3,575	3.88%	▼18.52
Turnout		94,072	64.03%	▲11.08
Total valid votes		92,175		
Registered electors		1,46,910		▲23.22
INC hold		Swing	▼14.43	

=== Assembly Election 1985 ===
1985 Maharashtra Legislative Assembly election : Jamner
Party	Candidate	Votes	%	±%
INC	Babusing Dagadusing Rathod	29,964	48.64%	New
Independent	Narayan Sonaji Patil	16,165	26.24%	New
BJP	Patil Suresh Mansaram	8,089	13.13%	New
Independent	Tayade Namdeo Sampat	3,619	5.87%	New
Independent	Koli Hiraman Natthu	1,353	2.20%	New
Independent	Chavan Morsing Sakaru	685	1.11%	New
Independent	Shaikh Abdul Said A. Rajjak	683	1.11%	New
Margin of victory		13,799	22.40%	▲16.44
Turnout		63,150	52.97%	▼7.04
Total valid votes		61,601		
Registered electors		1,19,226		▲8.10
INC gain from INC(U)		Swing	▲0.66	

=== Assembly Election 1980 ===
1980 Maharashtra Legislative Assembly election : Jamner
Party	Candidate	Votes	%	±%
INC(U)	Ishwarlal Shankarlal Jain	31,068	47.99%	New
INC(I)	Rathod Babusing Dagadusing	27,206	42.02%	▲25.01
Independent	Garud Gajananrao Raghunathrao	6,469	9.99%	New
Margin of victory		3,862	5.97%	▲2.19
Turnout		66,494	60.29%	▼5.46
Total valid votes		64,743		
Registered electors		1,10,289		▲10.33
INC(U) gain from Independent		Swing	▲23.11	

=== Assembly Election 1978 ===
1978 Maharashtra Legislative Assembly election : Jamner
Party	Candidate	Votes	%	±%
Independent	Gajananrao Raghunathrao Garud	15,955	24.88%	New
INC	Narayan Sonaji Patil	13,536	21.10%	▼27.58
Independent	Laxman Maharu Naik	11,702	18.24%	New
INC(I)	Babusingh Dagadusing Rathod	10,914	17.02%	New
Independent	Patil Laxman Tukaram	3,456	5.39%	New
Independent	Choudhari Prabhakar Dhanaji	3,021	4.71%	New
Independent	Patil Narayan Kisan	2,282	3.56%	New
Margin of victory		2,419	3.77%	▲1.14
Turnout		66,200	66.22%	▲7.42
Total valid votes		64,139		
Registered electors		99,965		▲10.51
Independent hold		Swing	▼26.44	

=== Assembly Election 1972 ===
1972 Maharashtra Legislative Assembly election : Jamner
Party	Candidate	Votes	%	±%
Independent	Narayan Kisan Patil	26,340	51.32%	New
INC	Kak Tarali K. Tafazulali	24,990	48.68%	▲6.14
Margin of victory		1,350	2.63%	▼8.10
Turnout		53,589	59.24%	▼0.41
Total valid votes		51,330		
Registered electors		90,457		▲8.35
Independent gain from INC		Swing	▲8.77	

=== Assembly Election 1967 ===
1967 Maharashtra Legislative Assembly election : Jamner
Party	Candidate	Votes	%	±%
INC	Abaji Nana Patil	20,302	42.54%	▼29.77
PSP	G. R. Garud	15,184	31.82%	New
ABJS	Mahadeo Ramchandra Lale	9,603	20.12%	▲15.84
SSP	S. H. Rathod	2,631	5.51%	New
Margin of victory		5,118	10.73%	▼40.51
Turnout		53,065	63.56%	▲5.51
Total valid votes		47,720		
Registered electors		83,487		▲11.33
INC hold		Swing	▼29.77	

=== Assembly Election 1962 ===
1962 Maharashtra Legislative Assembly election : Jamner
Party	Candidate	Votes	%	±%
INC	Abaji Nana Patil	28,009	72.32%	▲29.21
Independent	Mahadeo Ramchandra Lale	8,165	21.08%	New
ABJS	Gulabsing Ramchandra Rajput	1,660	4.29%	New
Independent	Shenfadu Dagadu Nikam	897	2.32%	New
Margin of victory		19,844	51.24%	▲37.44
Turnout		41,946	55.93%	▼3.95
Total valid votes		38,731		
Registered electors		74,992		▲25.45
INC gain from PSP		Swing	▲15.42	

=== Assembly Election 1957 ===
1957 Bombay State Legislative Assembly election : Jamner
Party	Candidate	Votes	%	±%
PSP	Garud Gajananrao Raghunathrao	18,908	56.90%	New
INC	Sane Nilkanth Ganesh	14,324	43.10%	New
Margin of victory		4,584	13.79%	
Turnout		33,232	55.59%	
Total valid votes		33,232		
Registered electors		59,778		
PSP win (new seat)				

== See also ==
- Jamner
- Jamner Municipal Council
- List of constituencies of Maharashtra Vidhan Sabha
