= Nagardeole =

Nagardeola Nagardeola Nagardeola
- Semi Urban
- Nagardeola
- Location in Maharashtra, India
- Coordinates: 20.5667°N 75.2167°E
- Country: India
- State: Pachora Maharashtra
- District: Jalgaon
- Named for: City of temples and'Nagardurg fort'is here.

Government
  - Type: Maharashtra Govt.and Central Govt.
  - Body: Grampanchayat Nagardeola

Population (2011)
  - Total: 14,229

Languages
  - Official: Marathi, Ahirani and Hindi language
- Time zone: UTC+5:30 (IST)
- Postal code: 424104
- Website: https://nagardeola.vercel.app/

Nagardeola is a census town in Jalgaon District in the Indian State of Maharashtra.

== Demographics ==
In the 2001 India census, Nagardeola had a population of 13,715. Males constituted 52% of the population and females 48%. Nagardeola has an average literacy rate of 79%, higher than the national average of 59.5%: male literacy was 83%, and female literacy was 74%. In Nagardeola, 13% of the population was under 6 years of age.

Nagardeola Village Website - https://nagardeola.vercel.app/
