= Jamner Municipal Council =

Type
- Type: Municipal Council of the Jamner

Leadership
- Mayor: Sadhana Mahajan, Bharatiya Janata Party
- Seats: 25

Elections
- Last election: 12-April-2018

Jamner is the Municipal council in district of Jalgaon, Maharashtra.

== History ==
Jamner is a Municipal Council city in district of Jalgaon, Maharashtra. The Jamner city is divided into 20 wards for which elections are held every 5 years. The Jamner Municipal Council has population of 46,762 of which 24,270 are males while 22,492 are females as per report released by Census India 2011.

== Municipal Council election ==
=== Electoral performance 2018 ===
S.No.	Party name	Alliance	Party flag or symbol	No. of Corporators
01	Shiv Sena (SS)	NDA		00
02	Bharatiya Janata Party (BJP)	NDA		25
03	Indian National Congress (INC)	UPA		00
04	Nationalist Congress Party (NCP)	UPA		00
