= Pachora Junction railway station =

Railway Station in Maharashtra, India

Pachora Junction
- Indian Railways logo

General information
- Location: Pachora, Maharashtra, Pincode 424201; Maharashtra India
- Coordinates: 20°40′07″N 75°54′51″E
- Elevation: 261 metres (856 ft)
- System: junction station
- Owner: Indian Railways
- Operator: Central Railway
- Line: Pachora–Jamner Line(Gauge Conversion)
- Platforms: 3
- Tracks: 7

Construction
- Parking: Yes
- Cycle facilities: Yes

Other information
- Status: Functioning
- Station code: PC
- Fare zone: Bhusawal

History
- Opened: 1860
- Electrified: 1968–69
- Former names: Great Indian Peninsula Railway

Passengers
- 5,000 per day
Location
- Location within India Location within Maharashtra

Pachora railway station serves Pachora in Jalgaon district in the Indian state of Maharashtra.

== Electrification ==
Railways in the Pachora area were electrified in 1968–69.

== Narrow-gauge railway ==
The station also serves the Pachora–Jamner narrow-gauge railway.

== Amenities ==
Amenities at Pachora railway station include: computerized reservation office, waiting room, benches, retiring room and book stall.

== Gallery ==
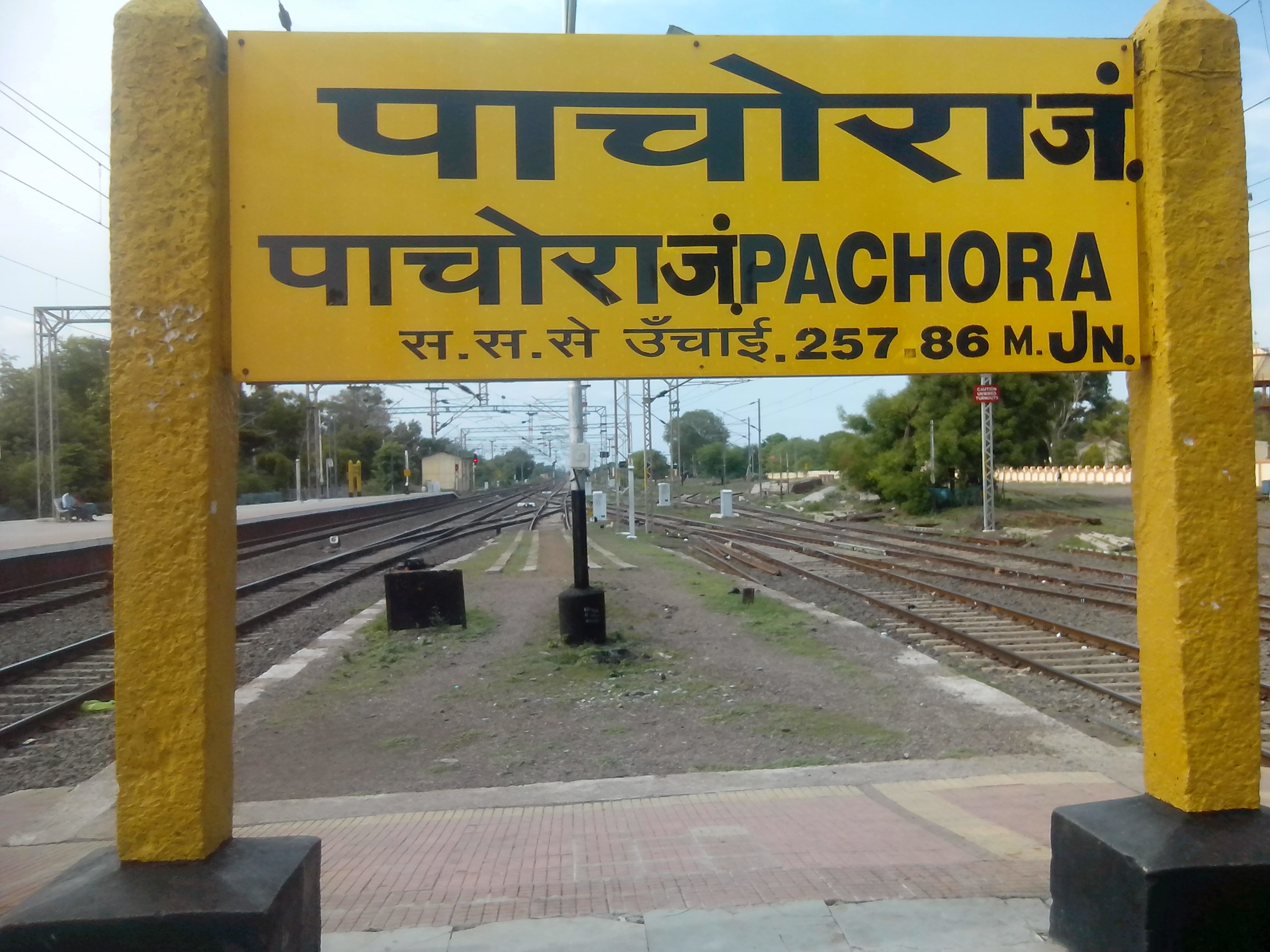
Pachora railway station

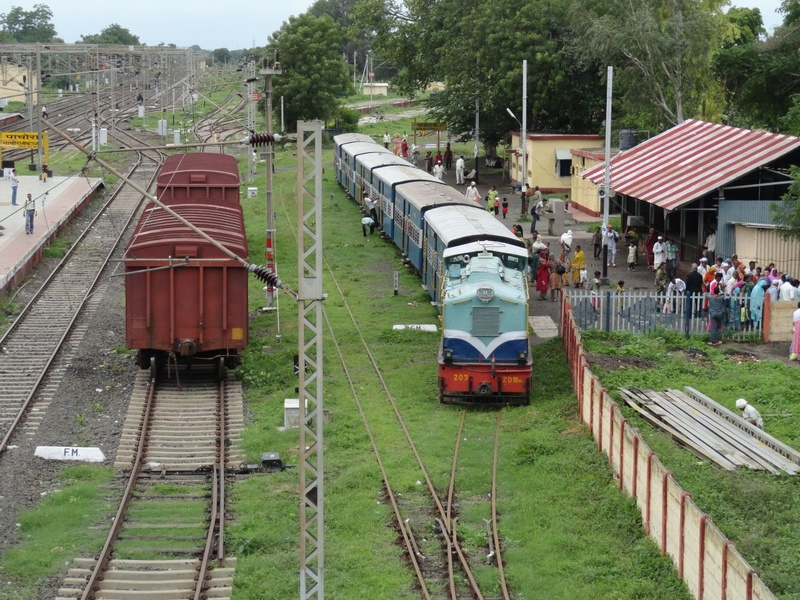
Pachora railway station

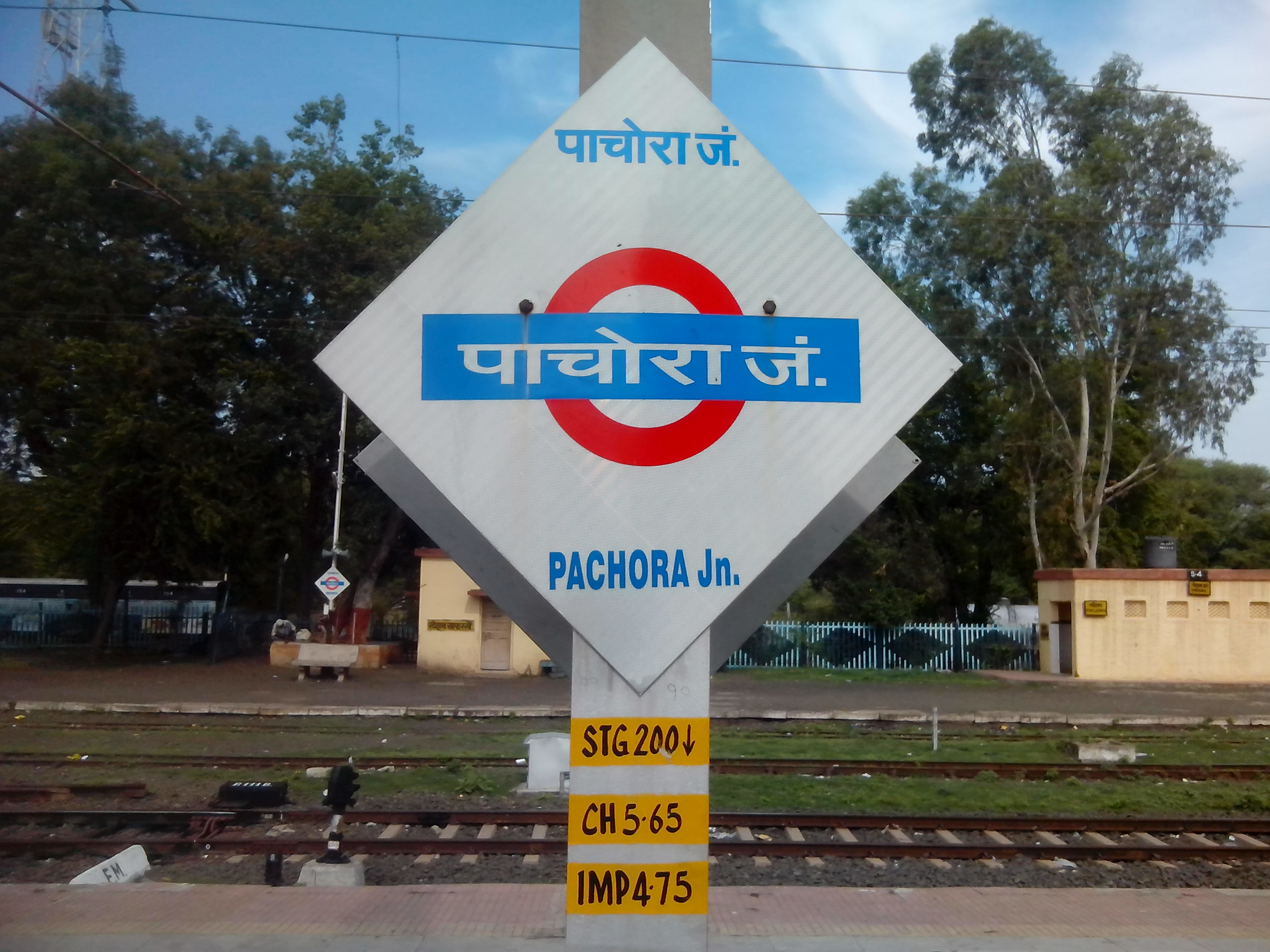
Pachora station board

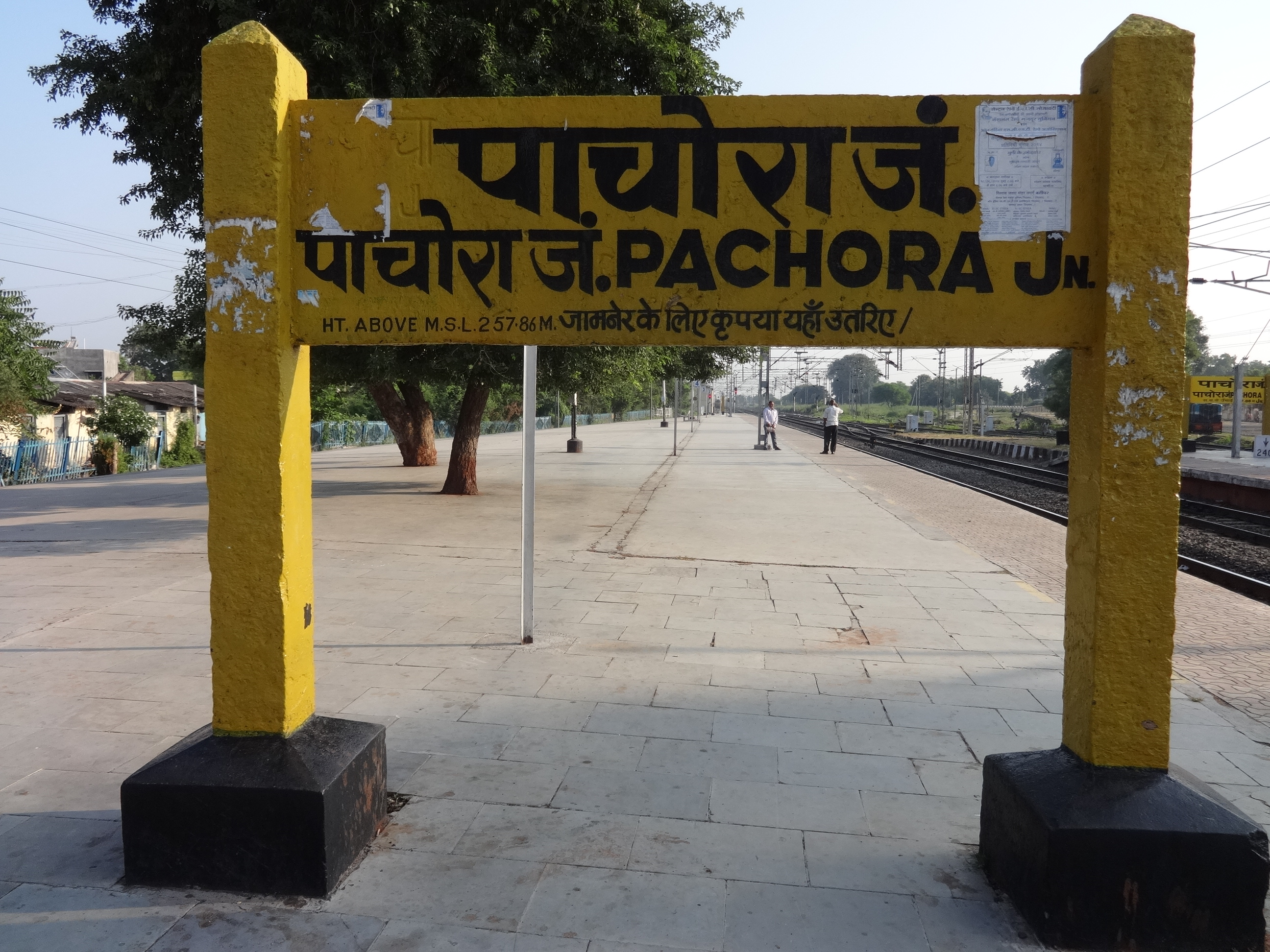
Pachora station

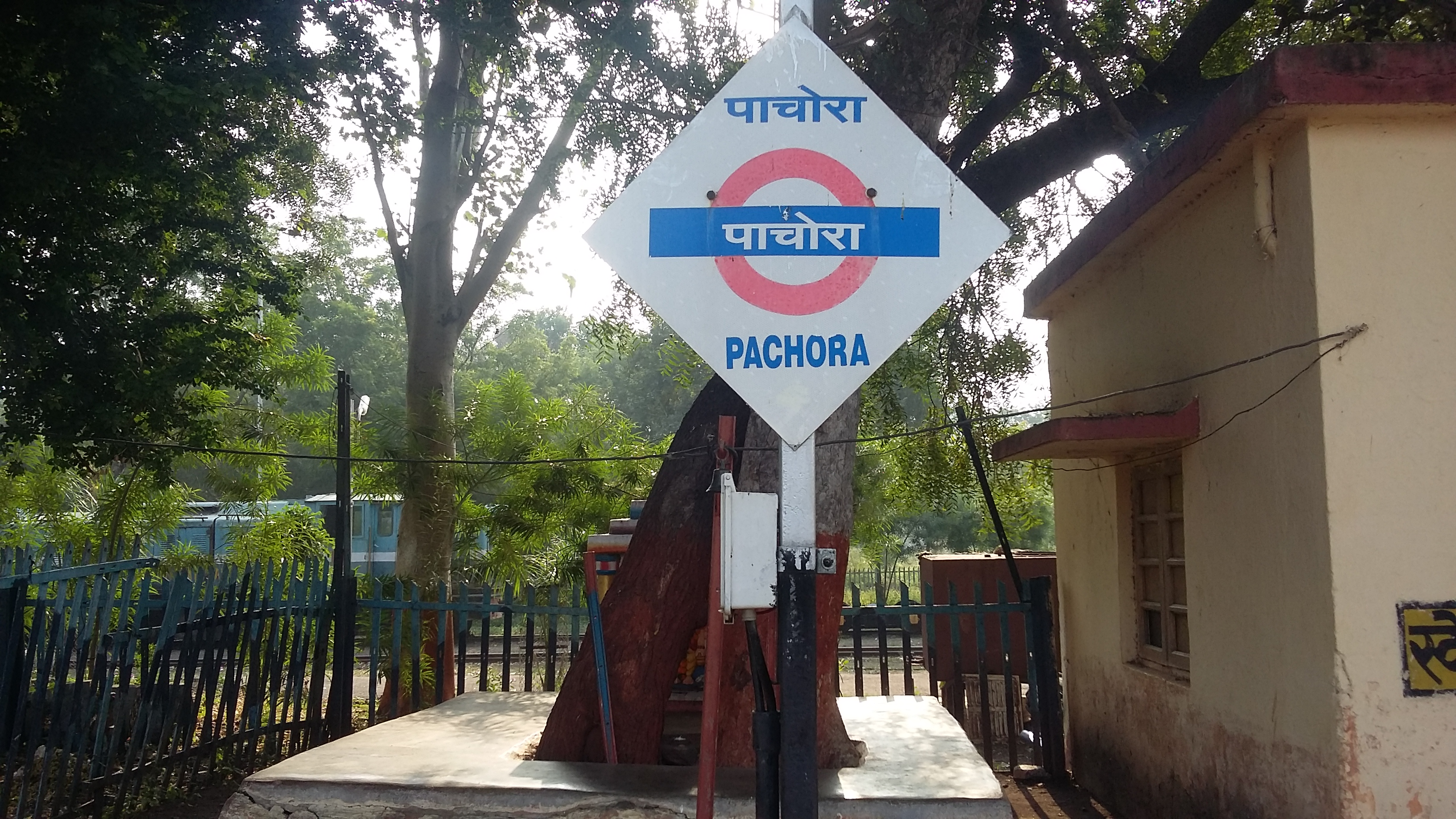
Narrow-gauge line platform Pachora

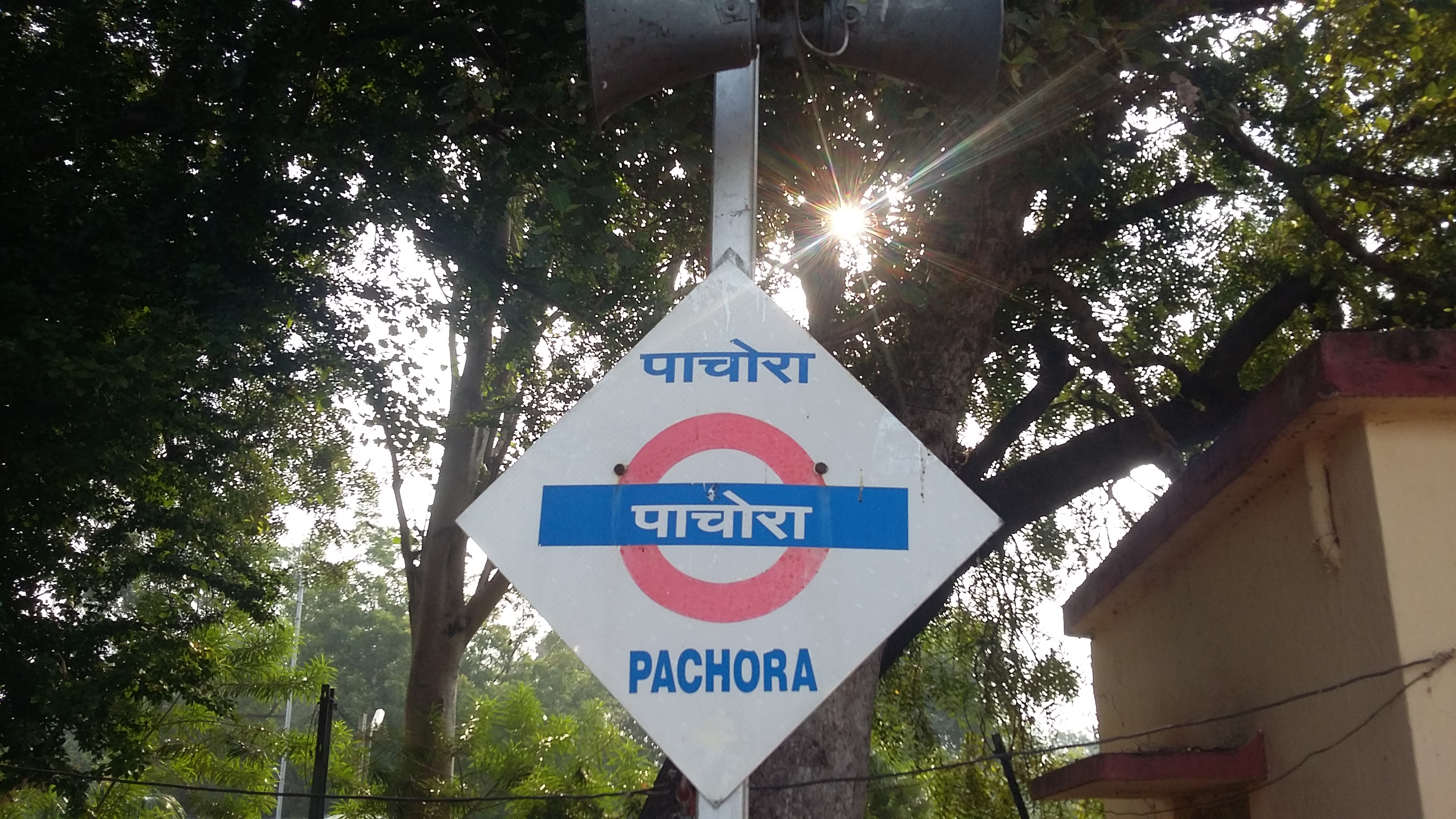
Pachora Junction

== See also ==
- High-speed rail in India
- Indian Railways
- Jalgaon District
- Rail transport in India
- List of railway stations in India
