= Pachora Municipal Council =

Municipal council in Maharashtra, India

Type
- Type: Municipal Council of the Pachora

History
- Founded: 1 April 1947

Leadership
- Mayor: Sanjay Gohil, Shivsena
- Corporator ward 13: Vikas Santosh Patil, Nationalist Congress Party
- Deputy Mayor: Priyanka Walmik Patil, Shivsena
- Seats: 26

Elections
- Last election: 27-Nov-2016

Website
- http://pachoramahaulb.maharashtra.gov.in/

Pachora is the Municipal council in district of Jalgaon, Maharashtra.

== History ==
The Pachora municipal council established on 1 April 1947.

== Municipal Council election ==
=== Electoral performance 2016 ===
S.No.	Party name	Alliance	Party flag or symbol	Number of Corporators
01	Shiv Sena (SS)	NDA		11
02	Bharatiya Janata Party (BJP)	NDA		02
03	Indian National Congress (INC)	UPA		00
04	Nationalist Congress Party (NCP)	UPA		07
05	Communist Party of India (CPI)			00
06	Janadhar Alliance			06
