= Jamner =

- City
- Location within Maharashtra Location within India
- Coordinates: 20°48′34″N 75°46′45″E
- Country: India
- State: Maharashtra
- District: Jalgaon

Government
  - Type: Municipal Council
  - Body: Municipal Council of Jamner

Dimensions
  - Length: 2.95 km (1.83 mi)
  - Width: 2.88 km (1.79 mi)
- Highest elevation (Hills of Mahadev temple): 277 m (909 ft)

Population (2011)
  - Total: 46,762
- Demonym: Jamnerkar

Language
  - Official: Marathi
- Time zone: UTC+5:30 (IST)
- PIN: 424206
- Telephone code: + 91 2580
- Vehicle registration: MH-19
- Nearest city: Jalgaon (35km); Bhusawal (26 km)
- Lok Sabha constituency: Raver
- Vidhan Sabha constituency: Jamner

Jamner City is a town and taluka in the Jalgaon district of Maharashtra state in India. It is part of the Khandesh region.

== Politics ==
Former Water resources minister of Maharashtra Girish Mahajan is a resident of Jamner. He is an MLA from Jamner since 1996.

== Demographics ==
| Year | Male | Female | Total Population | Change | Religion (%) | | | | | | | |
| Year | Male | Female | Total Population | Change | Hindu | Muslim | Christian | Sikhs | Buddhist | Jain | Other religions and persuasions | Religion not stated |
|---|---|---|---|---|---|---|---|---|---|---|---|---|
| 2011 | 24270 | 22492 | 46762 | - | 62.450 | 29.336 | 0.154 | 0.049 | 3.424 | 3.779 | 0.024 | 0.785 |

View source data.

== About Jamner ==
In the Indian state of Maharashtra's Jalgaon district sits the city of Jamner. It is roughly 20 km east of Jalgaon city and is located on the Girna River's banks. Jamner has a rich cultural history and is well known for these attributes.

The city has a lengthy history that begins in the Middle Ages, when it was a significant hub for trade and commerce. It played an important part in the Maratha Empire and was ruled by numerous dynasties, including the Satavahanas, Rashtrakutas, Chalukyas, and Mughals. The Jamner Fort, which the Mughals constructed in the sixteenth century, is one of the city's many historical sites.

== See also ==
- Jamner Municipal Council
- Deulgaon Gujari
