= Pahur, Maharashtra =

Pahur
- Town
- Location in Maharashtra, India
- Coordinates: 20°42′00″N 75°41′00″E
- Country: India
- State: Maharashtra
- District: Jalgaon

Population
  - Total: 40,000

Languages
  - Official: Marathi
- Time zone: UTC+5:30 (IST)
- Postal code: 424205

Pahur is a town on the banks of the river Waghur in Jalgaon district, Maharashtra, India. Its geographical coordinates are 20° 42' 0" North, 75° 41' 0" East.

The population was about 15,000 in 2010.

This town is divided in two parts - Pahur Peth and Pahur Kasabe. The other parts like Sai Nagar, Lele Nagar and Khwaja Nagar, Sant Ruplal Nagar are the newly developed hamlets.

== Agriculture ==
The main source of income for the people in Pahur is farming. The main crops are banana, kapas (cotton), jawar, wheat (gehu) and chillies bajari, makka, soyabean. Pahur supplies these crops to vegetable markets in Madhya Pradesh, Surat, Kalyan, Navi Mumbai and Mumbai.

The Taluka of Pahur is Jamner, 15 km away. In Pahur every Sunday a big market is held called "Bazaar". 9 km from Pahur is a village called Wakod where every Saturday a market is held for selling bullocks.

== River ==
The river name is Waghur. A long way back a tiger came to Pahur through the river from the Ajanta caves in the hills. As in the Marathi language a tiger is called a Wagh so people named the river as Waghur.

== Sights ==
- It has the temples of Vitthal Temple, Rama, Sangmeshwar Mahadev Mandir, Kewadeshwar Mandir in Peth side.& Temples on
- Santoshi mata Temple,(The biggest garbha concept is played here.) in Santoshi mata nagar, Pahur peth.
- The Ajanta Caves are located 20 kilometers away from Pahur.

== Transport ==
The main railway stations used to reach at Pahur are Bhusaval(42 km), Jalgaon (38 km) and Pachora (38 km). All these stations are 40 km. from Pahur.
