= Pachora =

- town
- Location in Maharashtra, India
- Coordinates: 20.67°N 75.35°E
- Country: India
- State: Maharashtra
- District: Jalgaon

Government
  - Type: Municipal council
  - Body: Pachora Municipal Council
- Elevation: 261 m (856 ft)

Population (2011)
  - Total: 59,609

Languages
  - Official: Marathi
- Time zone: UTC+5:30 (IST)
- PIN: 424201
- Telephone code: +91(02596)
- Vehicle registration: MH-19
- Lok Sabha Constituency: Jalgaon
- Vidhan Sabha Constituency: Pachora

Pachora is a town and a municipal council in the Jalgaon district in the Indian state of Maharashtra. It sits on the banks of the Hivra River. It includes 25 wards with 25 members of Nagarpalika. Pachora has a large rural infrastructure with 95 gram panchayats, which is the largest in any other tehsil place in Maharashtra. The Central Pachora is under Jalgaon Lok sabha Constituency.

== Demographics ==
According to the 2011 census, the population of Pachora was 59,609. Pachora Census Town hosts over 32787 houses.

The population of children aged 0-6 is 40, which is 18.96% of the total. The female sex ratio is .758 against a state average of .929. The Child Sex Ratio is around .739 compared to the Maharashtra state average of .894. The literacy rate is 84.67%. The male literacy is around 83.9% while the female literacy rate is 81.65%.

Year	Male	Female	Total Population	Change	Religion (%)							
Year	Male	Female	Total Population	Change	Hindu	Muslim	Christian	Sikhs	Buddhist	Jain	Other religions and persuasions	Religion not stated
2001	23511	21822	45333	-	73.880	21.141	0.126	0.099	3.326	1.363	0.004	0.060
2011	30958	28651	59609	0.315	75.234	19.264	0.200	0.146	2.916	1.552	0.015	0.674

== History ==
Pachora has a rich history that dates back to the medieval period. The town was known as "Pachavardhana" during the reign of the Mauryan Empire in the 3rd century BCE. It was also ruled by the Satavahanas, the Rashtrakutas, and the Yadavas. In the 14th century, the town was part of the Bahmani Sultanate, and later came under the control of the Mughal Empire in the 16th century.

During the British colonial period, Pachora was a small agricultural town that produced cotton and other crops. The town's cotton mills were established in the early 20th century and played a significant role in the town's economic development. Pachora was also part of the Indian independence movement and played an active role in the non-cooperation movement in the 1920s.

After India's independence in 1947, Pachora became part of the newly created state of Maharashtra. The town continued to grow and develop, and today it is a major center for cotton production, trade, and education in the region.

Pachora Municipal Council was established on 1 April 1947. Pachora grabbed a Vidhan-Sabha Constituency in 1952.

== Administration ==
The Council is authorized to build roads within Census Town limits and impose taxes on properties coming under its jurisdiction.

== Economy ==
Pachora has an agricultural economy. Its major crops are cotton, banana, maize, jowar, and bajara. The city has other businesses like gold and cloth markets. The primary livelihood is the cultivation of bananas and bajara.

== Festivals ==
Pachora has many historic temples. The Panchaleshwar temple was built by the Pandavas during their stay. It is said that Draupadi a.k.a. Panchali was a ardent devotee of Lord Shiva, she expressed her will to build a temple for Shiva.

In Nagardeola, Rath Galli, Balaji Mandir Temple is about 250 years old. Every year, its festival is celebrated and is called mela (fair) of 'Balaji Rath Yatra'. A 50-foot-high wooden Rath of Balaji Maharaj is pulled in its nearer specific route. Yatra starts in the morning and continues into the night. On KakanBardi hill, the fair ("Khandoba") has been celebrated for the last 800 years since the temple was constructed. This temple is situated on the top of a hill, 4 km from Pachora. It is also known as "Jai Malhar".

Pachora has two prominent temples, one of Goddess Kaila Mata Mandir (Bhadgaon road) and the other of Jagdamba Devi Mandir (Rath Galli). In both temples, during "Navratri Utsav", the holy program of Dandiya is celebrated for the 9 days of Navratri.

Pachora also has a famous dargah of Sufi saint - Hazrat Syed Jalalludin Bukhari. It is around 5 km from the city center to another village named - Goradkhede.

== Transport ==
=== Rail ===
Pachora is on the main line track of the central railway. It is 50 km from Jalgaon District station and 72 km from Bhusawal Junction. It is three hours from Nasik Road railway station and 6 hours from Mumbai.

Pachora–Jamner railway is a narrow-gauge branch line that connects Pachora to Jamner which is nearer to Ajanta Caves. The railway line was constructed by Shapoorji Godbole and Co. The Pachora to Pahur section was opened up in 1918 and the rest of the sections in 1919. On termination of the contracts with the former Great Indian Peninsula Railway Company, the line was brought under direct State management with effect from 1 July 1925.

=== Road ===
Pachora sits on state highway Nagpur-Pune and Nagpur-Surat. It is on the main state road network of state. It is 48 km from Jalgaon & 90 km from Dhule & 210 km From Nasik.

=== Air ===
Jalgaon Airport is the nearest airport (approximately 50 km).

== Gallery ==
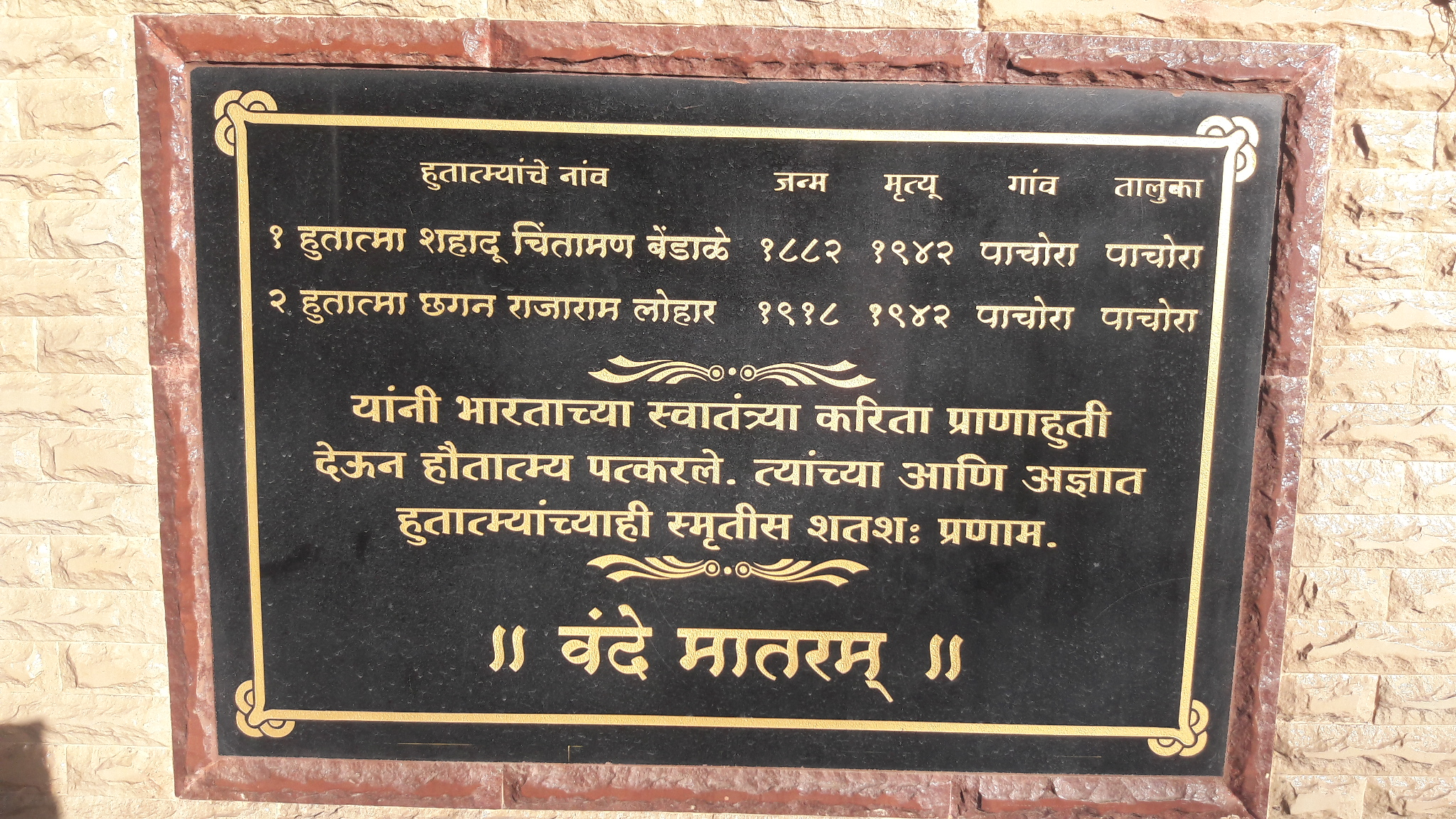
Hutatma Smarak Pachora

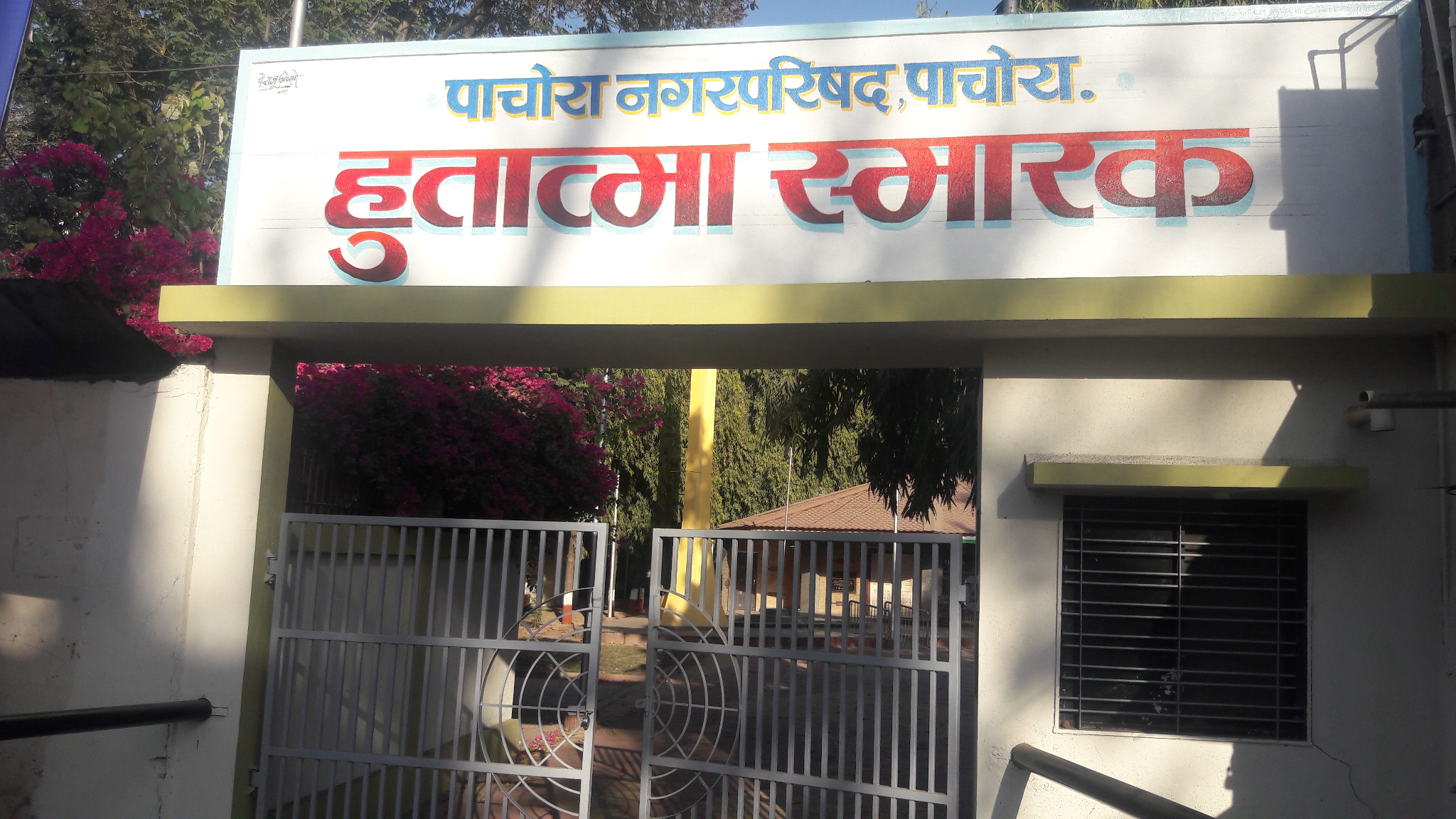
Martyr Memorial

== See also ==
- Pachora Junction
- Pachora Vidhansabha Constituency
- Pachora Municipal Council
- Ajanta Caves
