= Kothali, Muktainagar =

Kothadi
- Village
- Kothali
- Map showing Kothali in Maharashtra Kothali (India)
- Coordinates: 21°02′30″N 76°02′37″E
- Country: India
- State: Maharashtra
- District: Jalgaon
- Taluka: Muktainagar

Dimensions
  - Length: 0.872 km (0.542 mi)
  - Width: 0.771 km (0.479 mi)

Population
  - Total: 3,210
- Time zone: UTC+5:30 (IST)
- Postal code: 425306
- Area code: 02583
- Vehicle registration: MH-19

Kothadi is a village in Muktainagar taluka of Jalgaon district in the state Indian of Maharashtra. Kothadi's name is also written and pronounced as Kothali in Hindi and English. This village is administered by a Gram panchayat.

== Population ==
The settlement had a population of 3,210 according to the 2011 census, with 1,769 males and 1,441 females. The village's female literacy rate is at 76.30%, whereas the male literacy rate is at 87.59%.

== Notable people ==
- Eknath Khadse - Former state minister of Maharashtra and former MLA for Muktainagar.
- Raksha Khadse - MP for Raver Lok Sabha constituency since 2014.
