= Chandrakant Patil (disambiguation) =

Chandrakant Patil may refer to:

- Chandrakant Patil (born 1959), Indian politician, higher and technical education minister of the Government of Maharashtra and Kothrud Assembly constituency, MLA
- C. R. Patil (Chandrakant Raghunath Patil; born 1955), Indian politician and Member of Parliament from Navsari Lok Sabha constituency, Gujarat, and present Bharatiya Janata Party president of the state
- Chandrakant Nimba Patil (born 1972/1973), Indian politician and MLA of Muktainagar Assembly constituency
