= Pimprud =

Village in Maharashtra

- Village
- Location in Maharashtra, India Pimprud (India)
- Coordinates: 21.15°N 75.86°E
- Country: India
- State: Maharashtra
- District: Jalgaon
- Tehsil: Yawal
- Division: Nashik
- Region: Khandesh
- Elevation: 221 m (725 ft)

Population (2011)
  - Total: 1,492

Languages
  - Official: Marathi
- Time zone: UTC+5:30 (IST)
- PIN: 425503
- Telephone code: 02585
- Vehicle registration: MH-19
- Lok Sabha constituency: Raver
- Vidhan Sabha constituency: Raver

Pimprud is a village located in the Yawal tehsil of the Jalgaon district in Maharashtra state, India.

== Geography ==
Pimprud is a village located in the Yawal tehsil of the Jalgaon district in Maharashtra state, India.

Pimprud is located at 21.15°N 75.86°E. It has an average elevation of 221 metres (725 feet).

Village situated on the bank of Dhadi river. The total geographical area of village is 454.73 hectares(4.5473 km²), including Agriculture land.

== Demographics ==
As of 2011 India census, Pimprud had a population of 1,492. Males constitute 51% of the population and females 49%. Out of which nearby 10% of the population is under 6 years of age.

Pimprud has an average literacy rate of 84.80%, higher than the national average of 74.04. Male literacy is 89.84%, and female literacy is 79.55%.
