= Sonawane =

Sonawane is a surname. Notable people with the surname include:

- Keshavrao Sonawane, Indian politician
- Yashwant Sonawane, Indian civil servant, burned alive
- Latabai Sonawane, Indian politician
- Pratap Narayanrao Sonawane (1948), Indian politician
- T. H. Sonawane (1910–1973), Indian politician
- Chandrakant Sonawane, Indian politician
