= Raver, Maharashtra =

Raver Banana City
- City
- Location in Maharashtra, India
- Coordinates: 21°14′35″N 76°02′00″E
- Country: India
- State: Maharashtra
- District: Jalgaon

Government
  - Body: Municipal Council
  - MLA(Raver Vidhansabha Constituency): Shirish Madhukarrao Chaudhary (INC)
  - MP(Raver Loksabha Constituency): Raksha Khadse(BJP).
- Elevation: 248 m (814 ft)

Population (2011)
  - Total: 27,039

Languages
  - Official: Marathi
- Time zone: UTC+5:30 (IST)
- Postal code: 425508
- Telephone code: 02584
- ISO 3166 code: IN-MH
- Vehicle registration: MH-19

Raver, is a city and municipal council in Jalgaon district, renowned for its agricultural significance, particularly as a major banana-producing area. Often referred to as part of the "banana belt" of Jalgaon, Raver contributes significantly to the district's economy through banana exports, reaching markets across India and abroad. The town is characterized by its beautiful old architecture and ancient temples, reflecting a rich cultural heritage. It is also known for its scenic surroundings, with the nearby Pal Hill Station offering a retreat into nature with its diverse flora and fauna. As a hub of agricultural production and cultural history, Raver plays a crucial role in the region's development. Raver is famous for an ancient Dattatreya Temple. The Shri Datta Mandir Sansthan in Raver, is a spiritually significant temple with a rich heritage rooted in the Nath and Datta Sampradaya traditions. It was established around 1820 by Shri Sadguru Satchidanand Swami Maharaj, a revered saint in the lineage of Sant Eknath Maharaj.

This temple is known for housing sacred relics—the divine padukas (footprints) and a staff (chhadi) believed to be bestowed by Lord Dattatreya himself. The main deity is a one-faced Panchdhatu (five-metal) idol of Lord Dattatreya, symbolizing spiritual unity and divine grace.

Major highlights include: Datta Jayanti: Celebrated in the month of Margashirsha (Nov–Dec), with a grand rath yatra (chariot procession) that draws thousands of devotees from Maharashtra and Madhya Pradesh. Ekadashi Mahapuja and Thursday bhajans: Regular spiritual gatherings that keep the devotional flame alive. The temple also maintains a samadhi shrine of Sadguru Satchidanand Swami Maharaj, making it a pilgrimage site for seekers of the Sant Eknath tradition.

== Economy ==
Raver plays a pivotal role in the agricultural landscape of the Jalgaon district. The city is particularly famous for its banana production, contributing significantly to the district's reputation as a major banana belt. The bananas from Raver are not only distributed throughout India but are also exported abroad, supporting the local economy and providing employment to many residents.. Raver Taluka is an important market for bananas in the state of Maharashtra and India. It contributes to about more than 80% of production in Jalgaon district.

== Geography ==
Raver is located in North Maharashtra Region. It is 22 kilometres (14 mi) from Madhya Pradesh. It has an average elevation of 248 metres (814 ft). The Satpura Range is approximately 15 kilometres (9.3 mi) from the city. In the summer, the temperature ranges up to about 40–45 °C (104–113 °F).

== Transport ==
=== Roads ===
The town is connected to its district headquarters, Jalgaon (64 kilometres (40 mi)), by road. The Ankleshwar-Burhanpur National Highway (previously SH4) runs through the city. It connects Raver to Burhanpur (25 kilometres (16 mi)) in Madhya Pradesh & Ankaleshwar (365 kilometres (227 mi)) in Gujarat. This highway has caused Savda and neighbouring villages to become an important banana transportation hub. Due to increasing traffic, the road was converted into a national highway. The town is also well-connected to other villages through major roads.

=== Rail ===
Raver Railway Station is 4 kilometres (2.5 mi) from Raver in Jalgaon district in the Indian state of Maharashtra. Railways connect the city to Mumbai and Delhi. The Raver Railway station is located on the Major Bhusawal-Khandwa line of the Bhusawal Division of Central Railway. 60 to 70 trains run through this line daily, of which only 10 to 12 stop at this station.

=== Air ===
The nearby airports are Jalgaon, Aurangabad, and Devi Ahilya Bai Holkar Airport (Indore).

== Demographics ==
As of 2011 India census, Raver has a population of 27,039. Males constitute 52% of the population and females 48%. Raver has an average literacy rate of 65%, higher than the national average of 59.5%: male literacy is 72%, and female literacy is 58%. 15% of the population is under 6 years of age. Raver has a mixed population of all castes including Hindus and Muslims. The Adivasi people living in the Satpura Hills include Tadvi (Bhilla), Pawara, Bhilala, and Pardhi.

Year	Male	Female	Total Population	Change	Religion (%)							
Year	Male	Female	Total Population	Change	Hindu	Muslim	Christian	Sikhs	Buddhist	Jain	Other religions and persuasions	Religion not stated
2011	13843	13196	27039	-	51.807	42.772	0.078	0.048	3.905	0.614	0.041	0.736

== Politics ==
=== Raver Lok Sabha constituency ===
Raver Lok Sabha constituency is one of the 48 Lok Sabha (lower house of Indian parliament) constituencies of Maharashtra state in western India. This constituency was created on 19 February 2008 as a part of the implementation of the Presidential notification based on the recommendations of the Delimitation Commission of India constituted on 12 July 2002. It first held elections in 2009 and its first member of parliament (MP) was Haribhau Jawale of the Bharatiya Janata Party (BJP). As of the 2014 elections, the current MP is Raksha Khadase, also of the BJP.

=== Raver Vidhan Sabha Constituency ===
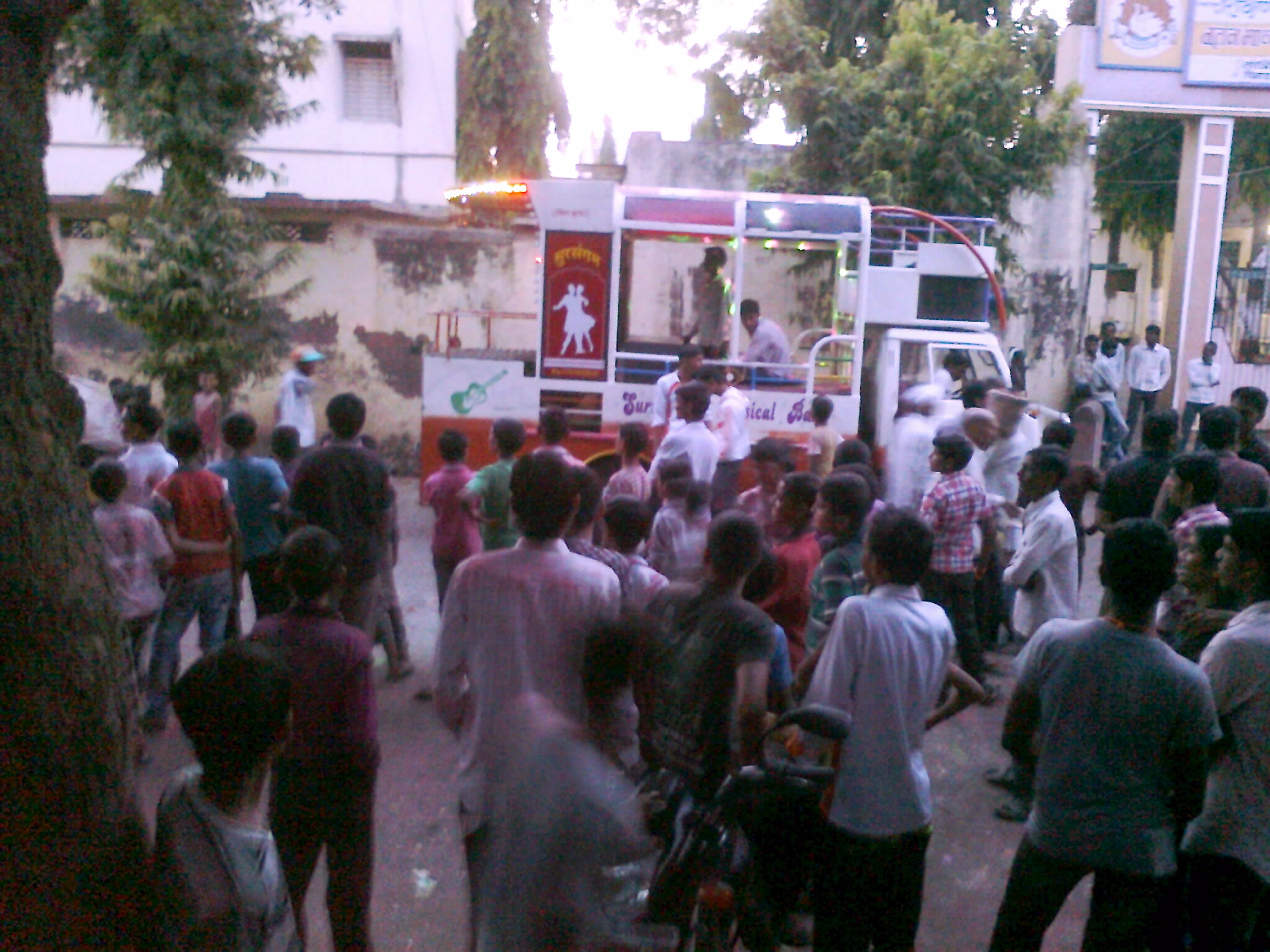
BJP's celebratory procession at Chinawal after Haribhau Jawale's victory from Raver constituency in 2014 assembly elections

Raver Vidhan Sabha constituency (Marathi: रावेर विधान सभा मतदारसंघ) is one of the 288 Vidhan Sabha (Legislative Assembly) constituencies of Maharashtra state in western India. This constituency comprises the Raver and Yaval taluka of Jalgaon district.

== Education ==
- Sardar G. G. High School and Junior College
- Raver Parisar Shikshan Prasarak Mandal's Shri. Vitthalrao Shankarao Naik Arts, and Commerce and Science College
- Macro Vision Academy School
- Podar School
- Raka international school
- Sardar G.G. High School & Jr. College
- K.S.A. Girls High School
- Yashwant Vidyalaya
- Anglo Urdu High School
- Nagarpalika schools
- Modern English Medium School
- Saraswati Vidya Mandir
- Swami Vivekanand school
- Akole High School
- Macro Vision Academy School (CBSE-affiliated)
- V.S. Naik College oF Arts, Commerce & Science
- Govt. I.T.I. College
- Kids Wonder A Play School
- Shri Swami Samarth Mahila
- Mahavidyalaya
- Shikshanshastra Mahila College
- Swami English medium school
- Aditya English medium school

== See also ==
- Karjod
