= Raver Lok Sabha constituency =

Lok Sabha constituency in Maharashtra

Coordinates: 21.2°N 76.0°E

Raver
- Lok Sabha constituency
- Raver Lok Sabha Constituency map

Constituency details
- Country: India
- Region: Western India
- State: Maharashtra
- District: Jalgaon, Buldhana
- Assembly constituencies: Chopda; Raver; Bhusawal; Jamner; Muktainagar; Malkapur
- Established: 2008
- Total electors: 18,21,750
- Reservation: None

Member of Parliament
- 18th Lok Sabha
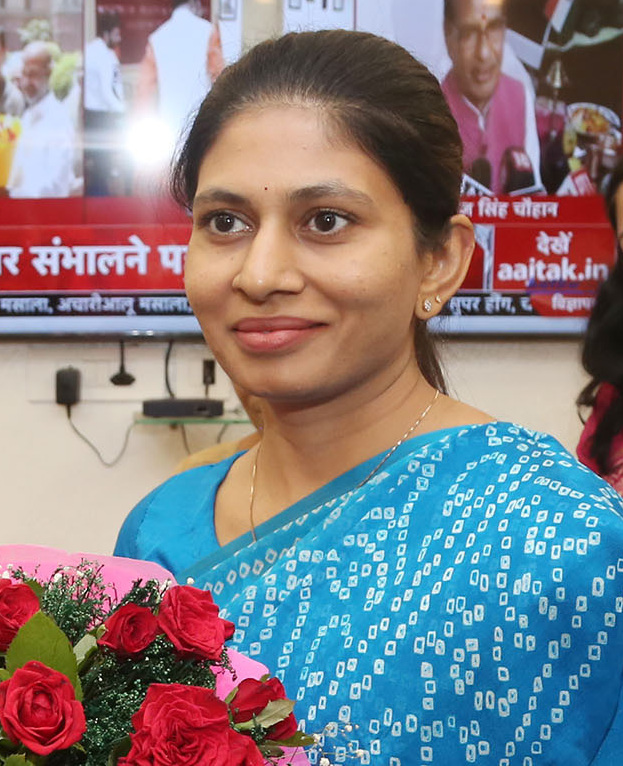
- Incumbent Raksha Khadse
- Party: BJP
- Alliance: NDA
- Elected year: 2024
- Preceded by: Haribhau Jawale, BJP

Raver is one of the 48 Lok Sabha (lower house of Indian parliament) constituencies of Maharashtra state in western India. This constituency was created on 19 February 2008 as a part of the implementation of the Presidential notification based on the recommendations of the Delimitation Commission of India constituted on 12 July 2002. It first held elections in 2009 and its first member of parliament (MP) was Haribhau Jawale of the Bharatiya Janata Party.

== Vidhan Sabha segments ==
Presently, Raver Lok Sabha constituency comprises six Vidhan Sabha (legislative assembly) segments. These segments are:

#	Name	District	Member	Party	Leading (in 2024)
10	Chopda (ST)	Jalgaon	Chandrakant Sonawane	SHS	BJP
11	Raver	Jalgaon	Amol Haribhau Jawale	BJP	BJP
12	Bhusawal (SC)	Jalgaon	Sanjay Sawakare	BJP	BJP
19	Jamner	Jalgaon	Girish Mahajan	BJP	BJP
20	Muktainagar	Jalgaon	Chandrakant Patil	SHS	BJP
21	Malkapur	Buldhana	Chainsukh Sancheti	BJP	BJP

== Members of Parliament ==
Year	Name	Party
till 2008 : Seat did not exist
2009	Haribhau Jawale	Bharatiya Janata Party
2014	Raksha Khadse	Bharatiya Janata Party
2019	Raksha Khadse	Bharatiya Janata Party
2024	Raksha Khadse	Bharatiya Janata Party

== Election results ==
=== General elections 2024 ===
2024 Indian general elections: Raver
Party	Candidate	Votes	%	±%
BJP	Raksha Khadse	630,879	53.84	▼6.63
NCP-SP	Shriram Dayaram Patil	3,58,696	30.61	New
VBA	Sanjay Pandit Bramhane	59,120	5.05	▼3.10
Independent	Eknath Nago Salunke	43,982	3.75	NA
BAP	Gulab Dayaram Bhil	9,644	0.82	New
BSP	Vijay Ramkrushna Kale	7577	0.65	▲0.12
NOTA	None of the Above	4,100	0.35	▼0.45
Majority		2,72,183	23.23	▼7.76
Turnout		11,71,666	64.32	▲2.55
BJP gain from NCP-SP		Swing		

=== General elections 2019 ===
2019 Indian general elections: Raver
Party	Candidate	Votes	%	±%
BJP	Raksha Khadse	655,386	60.47	0.47
INC	Dr. Ulhas Patil	3,19,504	29.48	27.37
VBA	Nitin Kandelkar	88,365	8.15	New
BSP	Yogendra Viththal Kolate	5,705	0.53	NA
IND	D. D. Wani	4,274	0.4	0.06
IND	Nazmin Shaikh Ramjan	2,581	0.24	NA
Hindustan Janta Party	Madhukar Sopan Patil	1,607	0.1	NA
IUML	Roshan Aara Sadikali	1,103	0.10	NA
RJP	Ajit Namdar Tadvi	1,425	0.1	NA
IND	Tawar Vijay Jagan	1,141	0.1	NA
IND	Guarav Damodar Surwade	985	0.1	NA
NOTA	None of the Above	9216	0.8	NA
Majority		3,35,882	30.99	
Turnout		1,096,511	61.77	27.90
BJP gain from INC		Swing		

=== General elections 2014 ===
2014 Indian general elections: Raver
Party	Candidate	Votes	%	±%
BJP	Raksha Khadse	605,452	60.00	+14.33
NCP	Manish Jain	2,87,384	28.48	−13.27
BSP	Dashram Motiram Bhande	29,000	2.95	−1.72
NOTA	None of the Above	4,212	0.41	N/A
Margin of victory		318,068	31.52	+27.60
Turnout		10,11,417	63.48	+12.73
BJP gain from NCP		Swing	+14.33	

=== General elections 2009 ===
2009 Indian general elections: Raver
Party	Candidate	Votes	%	±%
BJP	Haribhau Jawale	328,843	45.67	N/A
NCP	Bhaiyyasaheb Ravindra Patil	3,00,625	41.75	N/A
BSP	Suresh Patil	33,641	4.67	N/A
BBM	Teli Shaikh Ismail Haji Hasan	11,510	1.60	N/A
Margin of victory		28,218	3.92	N/A
Turnout		7,20,035	50.75	N/A
BJP gain from NCP		Swing		

== See also ==
- Erandol Lok Sabha constituency
- Jalgaon district
- Buldhana district
- List of constituencies of the Lok Sabha
