= Rajesh Panditrao Ekade =

Indian politician

Member of Maharashtra Legislative Assembly
- In office 2019–2024
- Preceded by: Chainsukh Sancheti
- Succeeded by: Chainsukh Sancheti
- Constituency: Malkapur

Personal details
- Born: Nandura
- Party: Indian National Congress
- Occupation: Politician

Rajesh Panditrao Ekade is a leader of Indian National Congress and a member of the Maharashtra Legislative Assembly elected from Malkapur Assembly constituency in Buldhana city.

== Positions held ==
- 2019: Elected to Maharashtra Legislative Assembly.
