= Eknath Khadse =

Indian politician

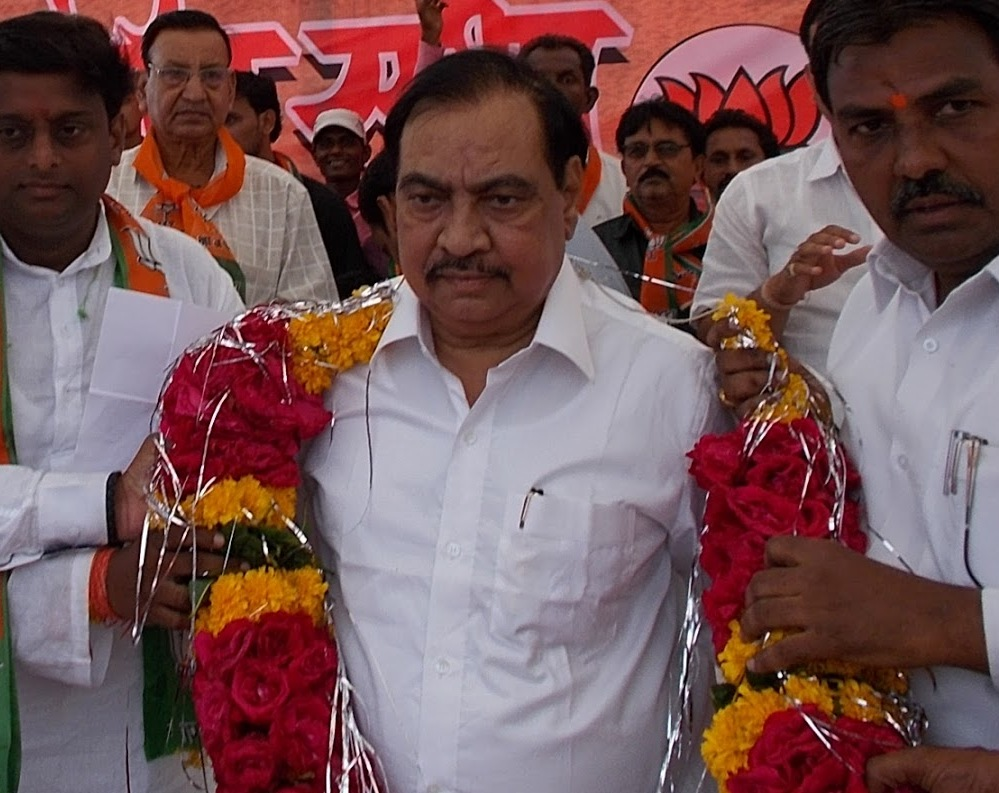

Leader of the Opposition Maharashtra Legislative Assembly
- In office 11 November 2009 – 21 October 2014
- Chief Minister: Ashok Chavan; Prithviraj Chavan
- Preceded by: Ramdas Kadam
- Succeeded by: Eknath Shinde

Leader of the House Maharashtra Legislative Council
- In office 9 December 2014 – 7 July 2016
- Chief Minister: Devendra Fadnavis
- Preceded by: R R Patil
- Succeeded by: Chandrakant Patil

Cabinet Minister Government of Maharashtra
- In office 31 October 2014 – 4 June 2016
- Cabinet: Fadnavis ministry
- Chief Minister: Devendra Fadnavis
- Portfolios: Revenue · Agriculture · State Excise · Animal Husbandry, Dairy Development & Fisheries · Minority Development & Aukaf
- Preceded by: Balasaheb Thorat
- Succeeded by: Chandrakant Patil
- In office June 1995 – 18 October 1999
- Cabinet: Manohar Joshi ministry
- Chief Minister: Manohar Joshi; Narayan Rane
- Portfolios: Higher & Technical Education · Finance · Water Resources
- Preceded by: Hashu Advani
- Succeeded by: Mahadeo Shivankar

Member of Maharashtra Legislative Assembly
- In office 1990–2019
- Preceded by: Haribhau Jaware
- Succeeded by: Chandrakant Nimba Patil
- Constituency: Muktainagar

Member of the Maharashtra Legislative Council
- Incumbent
- Assumed office 8 July 2022
- Constituency: elected by Legislative Assembly members

Personal details
- Born: 2 September 1952 (age 74) Muktainagar, Bombay State, India
- Party: Nationalist Congress Party (Sharadchandra Pawar) (2024–present)
- Other political affiliations: Nationalist Congress Party (2020–2024); Bharatiya Janata Party (1980–2020)
- Spouse: Manda
- Relations: Raksha Khadse (daughter-in-law)
- Children: 3, including Rohini Khadse-Khewalkar

Eknath Ganpatrao Khadse (born 2 September 1952) is a politician and a leader of the Nationalist Congress Party in Maharashtra state. He was a Member of Legislative Assembly of Maharashtra from Muktainagar constituency for six consecutive terms till 2019. He was a member of the Bharatiya Janata Party from 1987 until his resignation in October 2020. He is a member of Legislative Council of Maharashtra.

== Political career ==
=== Early years ===
Khadse lost his first election when he contested the Gram panchayat elections in Kothadi village. Later he became sarpanch of Kothadi village in 1984, remaining sarpanch until 1987. In 1989, he was elected as member of the Maharashtra legislative assembly (MLA) for the Muktainagar constituency.

Khadse entered in active politics as a BJP worker in the 1980s and helped the party BJP establish its base in North Maharashtra. In 1990's Khadse led karsevaks during Ram Janmabhoomi movement. He was arrested at Jhansi by Uttarpradesh police and was jailed for a month.

Hailing from the influential Leva Gurjar community in North Maharashtra, Khadse quickly positioned himself as an OBC leader.

=== State Minister (1995–1999) ===
In 1995, Khadse became a minister in Chief Minister Manohar Joshi's state cabinet. He was close to then-deputy CM and BJP leader Gopinath Munde and handled finance and irrigation portfolios between 1995 and 1999. After Joshi's resignation as the chief minister, he took an oath as minister when Narayan Rane became Chief minister.

On 13 December 2005, Eknath Khadse was suspended for six months from Maharashtra state assembly's lower house due to making derogatory remarks against the then-speaker Babasaheb Kupekar and Deputy speaker Pramod Shende in their chambers.

=== Opposition leader (2009–2014) ===
Khadse served as the leader of the opposition from November 2009 to October 2014. His successful tenure as the opposition leader led BJP to the victory in later 2014 election.

=== 2014 elections and chief minister contention ===
He announced breakup of long-held Shivsena-BJP alliance before 2014 assembly election and BJP decided to contest that election alone without Shiv Sena. He assured Narendra Modi that BJP can win this election on their own. After the strong showing in 2014 elections, Khadse was seen as the strong conteder for the role of Chief minister of Maharashtra, but Devendra Fadnavis was ultimately chosen for the post. Khadse held more than dozen portfolios during the first two years including ministries of excise, revenue, and agriculture.

=== Resignation from ministry (2016) ===
On 3 June 2016, Khadse resigned as Revenue Minister following allegations of corruption and misuse of office. Since then he was allegedly sidelined by BJP and ignored by central leadership.

For the 2019 Maharashtra assembly polls, BJP dropped Khadse's name from the candidate's list. Khadse blamed internal party politics, specifically Devendra Fadnavis and Girish Mahajan, for denial of a ticket. Instead the party offered ticket to his daughter Rohini Khadse-Khewalkar. She lost a closely contested election by 1987 votes against Shiv sena's Chandrakant Nimba Patil.

=== Resignation from the BJP and joining NCP ===
He quit BJP in October 2020 and joined NCP.

== Controversies ==
Khadse was involved in controversies even before 2016 corruption charges. He first courted controversy when he advised farmers to pay their electricity bills instead of splurging money on cellphones. TV news channels and print media criticized him for wastage 10,000 lit. of water for the creation of temporary helipad in his tour of drought suffering Latur that time.

=== Accusations of nepotism ===
Khadse's tendencies to forward the interests of his kin did not go down well with the rank and file of his party [BJP]. Many members harboured resentment over how he promoted his family members to important posts in Jalgaon. His daughter-in-law Raksha Khadse is an MP from Raver, while his daughter Rohini Khewalkar was made director of the district cooperative bank and wife Mandakini became the director of Mahanand, the state milk cooperative federation.

=== Corruption charges and resignation ===
Khadse resigned on 3 June 2016 after allegations of impropriety surfaced against him in a land deal in Pune. Realtor Hemant Gavande leveled charges of land grabbing against him, alleging that Khadse had misused his position as the State Revenue Minister to illegally execute sales deeds for a three-acre (1.2 ha) industrial plot at Bhosari in Pune District in the names of his wife and son-in-law. Khadse is accused of buying land at prices much lower than market price through his influence and ministry. Former Aam Aadmi Party politician and activist Anjali Damania went on hunger strike and demanded inquiry against Eknath Khadse. She ended her hunger strike after then-CM Devendra Fadnavis assured her that he would do a proper investigation of the Pune land deal and other corruption accusations of Khadse. She filed public interest litigation against Khadse. In retaliation, Khadse filed a case against her at Muktainagar accusing her of maligning his image by submitting false affidavits at Bombay High Court and sought her arrest. Khadse accused Damania of making false and defamatory statements against him and served defamation notice. In 2017, following orders of Bombay High Court, the state anti corruption bureau registered case against Khadse, his wife Manda Khadse, and his son-in-law Girish Choudhary.

In May 2018, Khadse claimed a clean chit from the Anti-Corruption Bureau (ACB) of the Maharashtra Police, saying the ACB wasn't able to prove the allegations.

On 30 December 2020 the Enforcement Directorate summoned him on this land deal case to interrogate and ask to provide documents. Khadse later claimed that the land at Pune was purchased by his wife Manda Khadse and he personally had nothing to do with it.

== Personal life ==
Khadse was born in Kothadi village to Ganpat Khadse and Godavari bai Khadse in Muktainagar tehsil of Jalgaon district. His son, Nikhil, committed suicide on 1 May 2013. He hails from the Leva Patil community. His daughter-in-law Raksha Khadse is a member of the 18th Lok Sabha from the Raver constituency, serving her third term and currently Minister of State for Youth and Sports.

== Positions held ==
- BJP Muktainagar taluka vice president (1980–1985)
- Sarpanch of Kothali (1984–1987)
- Muktainagar Panchayat samiti's member (1982–1990)
- BJP Jalgaon district president (1991–1995)
- Maharashtra BJP general secretary (1999–2004)
- Member of Maharashtra legislative assembly for Muktainagar (1989–2019)
- Minister for Higher and Technical Education (June 1995 to September 1995)
- Minister for Finance and Planning (September 1995 to June 1997)
- Minister for Irrigation and Command Area Development (June 1997 to October 1999)
- Leader of Opposition, Maharashtra Legislative Assembly (November 2009 to August 2014)
- Minister of Revenue, Agriculture, State Excise of Maharashtra (October 2014 to June 2016)
- Member Of Maharashtra Legislative Council (2022-2028)
- Ncp Party Leader - Maharashtra Legislative Council

Political offices
Preceded by Narayan Rane	Cabinet Minister for Revenue, Excise and Minority Affairs; Government of Maharashtra; 31 October 2014 –	Succeeded by Incumbent
Preceded by Balasaheb Thorat	Cabinet Minister for Agriculture; Government of Maharashtra; 31 October 2014–present	Incumbent
Preceded by	Maharashtra State Guardian Minister for Jalgaon district 2014–present	Incumbent
Preceded by	Maharashtra State Guardian Minister for Buldhana district 2014–present	Incumbent
