= Tangade Dayaram Sukdeo =

Indian politician

Dayaram Tangade Patil was a Member of Maharashtra Legislative Assembly from 1990 to 1995. He represented Malkapur Vidhansabha Constituency from Bharatiya Janata Party.

Maharashtra Legislative Assembly Elections 1990
S.No.	Candidate Name	Party	Symbol	Gender	Age	Votes Polled	Vote %
1	Tangade Dayaram Sugdeo	BJP *	0	M	-	33578	34.98%
2	Kolte Dinkar Yadao	INC *	0	M	-	30578	31.86%
3	Sharma Damodhar Nathmal	JD *	0	M	-	10532	10.97%
4	Lahulkar Vasantrao Narayan	ICS(SCS) *	0	M	-	9293	9.68%
5	Patil Ganesharao Babarao	MMS *	0	M	-	8642	9%
