= Rohini Khadse-Khewalkar =

Indian politician

Adv.Rohini Khadse-Khaewalkar

Personal details
- Born: Rohini Eknath Khadse; 1 December 1982 (age 43) Muktainagar, Maharashtra, India
- Party: NCP-SP (2020-Present)
- Other political affiliations: Bharatiya Janata Party (2019–2020)
- Spouse: Pranjal Khewalkar
- Relations: Raksha Khadse (Sister-in-law)
- Children: 2 (Sara & Samarjit)
- Parent(s): Eknath Khadse (Father), Mandakini Khadse (Mother)
- Education: B.Com, LLB, Mumbai University LLM Pune University
- Profession: Politician

Rohini Khadse-Khewalkar is an Indian politician. She is a leader of NCP(SP) and the president of its women wing. She is the daughter of Eknath Khadse. In 2025, she controversially petitioned Indian President Droupadi Murmu to allow women to commit one murder without repercussion in view of the growing crime against women.

She lost Muktainagar Assembly constituency two times in 2014 and 2019 assembly election.

== Positions held ==
- 2015 to 2021 - President of Jalgaon District Central Cooperative Bank.
- 2013 to present - President of Adishakti Muktai Sahakari Soot Girni Ltd
