= Karjod =

Village in Maharashtra

- village
- Location in Maharashtra, India Karjod (India)
- Coordinates: 21°16′16″N 76°5′8″E
- Country: India
- State: Maharashtra
- District: Jalgaon

Government
  - Body: Gram Panchayat

Languages
  - Official: Marathi
- Time zone: UTC+5:30 (IST)

Karjod is a village on the foothills of the Satpura Range, in the administrative tehsil of Raver in Jalgaon district.

Its nearest railway station is in Waghod and nearest airport is in Jalgaon. The village comprises both Hindu and Muslim Population. The main source of revenue is Farming
