= Bhusawal Assembly constituency =

Constituency of the Maharashtra legislative assembly in India

Coordinates: 21.05°N 75.79°E

Bhusawal
- Constituency No. 12 for the Maharashtra Legislative Assembly

Constituency details
- Country: India
- Region: Western India
- State: Maharashtra
- District: Jalgaon
- Lok Sabha constituency: Raver
- Established: 1955
- Total electors: 316,631
- Reservation: SC

Member of Legislative Assembly
- 15th Maharashtra Legislative Assembly
- Incumbent Sanjay Waman Sawakare
- Party: BJP
- Alliance: NDA
- Elected year: 2024

Bhusawal Assembly constituency is one of the 288 Vidhan Sabha constituencies of Maharashtra state in western India. This constituency is located in Jalgaon district.

== Overview ==
Bhusawal is part of the Raver Lok Sabha constituency along with four other Vidhan Sabha segments in this district, namely Chopda, Raver, Jamner and Muktainagar and one Vidhan Sabha segment in the adjoining Buldhana district, Malkapur.

== Members of Legislative Assembly ==
Year	Member	Party
1957	Dattatraya Bhirud	Indian National Congress
1962	Dattatraya Bhirud	Indian National Congress
1967	P. S. Phalak	Indian National Congress
1972	Prabhakar Mahajan	Indian National Congress
1978	Devidas Bhole	Indian National Congress
1980	Mohammad Yasin Bagwan	Indian National Congress (I)
1985	Dagadu Chaudhari	Janata Party
1990	Nilkanth Phalak	Indian National Congress
1995	Dilip Bhole	Shiv Sena
1999	Dilip Bhole	Shiv Sena
2004	Santosh Chaudhari	Nationalist Congress Party
2009	Sanjay Sawakare	Nationalist Congress Party
2014	Sanjay Sawakare	Bharatiya Janata Party
2019	Sanjay Sawakare	Bharatiya Janata Party
2024	Sanjay Sawakare	Bharatiya Janata Party

== Election result ==
=== Assembly Election 2024 ===
2024 Maharashtra Legislative Assembly election : Bhusawal
Party	Candidate	Votes	%	±%
BJP	Sanjay Waman Sawakare	107,259	58.69%	▲3.26
INC	Dr. Rajesh Tukaram Manwatkar	59,771	32.71%	New
Independent	Swati Kunal Jangale	9,764	5.34%	New
VBA	Jagan Deoram Sonawane	3,720	2.04%	▼2.62
NOTA	None of the Above	1,538	0.84%	▼1.38
Margin of victory		47,488	25.99%	▼9.99
Turnout		1,84,289	58.20%	▲9.84
Total valid votes		1,82,751		
Registered electors		3,16,631		▲2.87
BJP hold		Swing	▲3.26	

=== Assembly Election 2019 ===
2019 Maharashtra Legislative Assembly election : Bhusawal
Party	Candidate	Votes	%	±%
BJP	Sanjay Waman Sawakare	81,689	55.43%	▼1.25
Independent	Dr. Madhu Rajesh Manawatkar	28,675	19.46%	New
NCP	Jagan Deoram Sonawane	20,245	13.74%	▼20.58
VBA	Sunil Dada Surwade	6,868	4.66%	New
NOTA	None of the Above	3,277	2.22%	▲1.29
Independent	Gita Prashant Khachane	2,157	1.46%	New
MNS	Nilesh Amrut Suralkar	2,095	1.42%	▲0.70
Independent	Satish Bhika Ghule	1,572	1.07%	New
Margin of victory		53,014	35.97%	▲13.62
Turnout		1,50,661	48.95%	▼8.40
Total valid votes		1,47,377		
Registered electors		3,07,797		▲11.79
BJP hold		Swing	▼1.25	

=== Assembly Election 2014 ===
2014 Maharashtra Legislative Assembly election : Bhusawal
Party	Candidate	Votes	%	±%
BJP	Sanjay Waman Sawakare	87,818	56.68%	New
NCP	Zalte Rajesh Dhanaji	53,181	34.32%	▼12.71
SS	Bramhane Sanjay Pandit	7,598	4.90%	▼39.16
INC	Sonawane Pushpa Jagannath	3,005	1.94%	New
NOTA	None of the Above	1,447	0.93%	New
MNS	Ramdas Shrawan Sawakare	1,123	0.72%	New
BSP	Dr. Vandana Umendra Waghchoure	1,048	0.68%	▼0.88
Margin of victory		34,637	22.35%	▲19.39
Turnout		1,56,450	56.82%	▲5.42
Total valid votes		1,54,950		
Registered electors		2,75,330		▲6.42
BJP gain from NCP		Swing	▲9.65	

=== Assembly Election 2009 ===
2009 Maharashtra Legislative Assembly election : Bhusawal
Party	Candidate	Votes	%	±%
NCP	Sanjay Waman Sawakare	61,875	47.03%	▼7.86
SS	Ad. Rajesh Dhanaji Zalte	57,972	44.06%	▲5.66
BSP	Dinesh Jogdand Alias Laddu	2,045	1.55%	▼1.69
Independent	Adv.Raut Sanjaykumar Kaduji	1,699	1.29%	New
Independent	Sapkale Ravindra Baliram	1,589	1.21%	New
RPI(A)	Makasare Ramesh Dagadu	1,437	1.09%	New
Independent	Kharat Ravindra Baburao	1,029	0.78%	New
Margin of victory		3,903	2.97%	▼13.52
Turnout		1,31,719	50.91%	▼14.84
Total valid votes		1,31,573		
Registered electors		2,58,725		▲0.92
NCP hold		Swing	▼7.86	

=== Assembly Election 2004 ===
2004 Maharashtra Legislative Assembly election : Bhusawal
Party	Candidate	Votes	%	±%
NCP	Chaudhari Satoshbhau Chabildas	92,430	54.88%	▲31.01
SS	Bhole Dilip Atmaram	64,664	38.40%	▲1.64
BSP	Shaikh Ramjan Shaikh Karim	5,460	3.24%	New
Independent	Sopan Chavdas Phalak	3,100	1.84%	New
Independent	Choudhary Santosh Shankar	1,364	0.81%	New
Margin of victory		27,766	16.49%	▲7.44
Turnout		1,68,463	65.71%	▲9.76
Total valid votes		1,68,408		
Registered electors		2,56,362		▲18.40
NCP gain from SS		Swing	▲18.13	

=== Assembly Election 1999 ===
1999 Maharashtra Legislative Assembly election : Bhusawal
Party	Candidate	Votes	%	±%
SS	Bhole Dilip Atmaram	44,514	36.76%	▼1.14
Independent	Chaudhari Satoshbhau Chabildas	33,553	27.71%	New
NCP	Ingale Vasudeo Ananda	28,917	23.88%	New
BBM	Mahendra Rajaram Tayade	9,866	8.15%	▲1.55
Independent	Sau. Nyati Jayashree Shaligram	1,734	1.43%	New
Maharashtra Vikas Congres	Patil Bhagwat Keshav	1,682	1.39%	New
Margin of victory		10,961	9.05%	▼6.55
Turnout		1,28,619	59.40%	▼11.93
Total valid votes		1,21,108		
Registered electors		2,16,517		▼1.06
SS hold		Swing	▼1.14	

=== Assembly Election 1995 ===
1995 Maharashtra Legislative Assembly election : Bhusawal
Party	Candidate	Votes	%	±%
SS	Bhole Dilip Atmaram	56,277	37.90%	New
INC	Bhole Devidas Namdeo	33,104	22.29%	▼14.24
Independent	Mehmood Husain Raja Husain	21,863	14.72%	New
JD	Chaudhary Dagadu Kashiram	11,342	7.64%	▼10.47
BBM	Mahendra Rajaram Tayade	9,799	6.60%	New
Independent	Onkar Pundlik Bhole	7,400	4.98%	New
Independent	Phalak Hrishchandra Shankar	2,240	1.51%	New
Margin of victory		23,173	15.61%	▲8.32
Turnout		1,52,491	69.69%	▲18.91
Total valid votes		1,48,497		
Registered electors		2,18,827		▲12.31
SS gain from INC		Swing	▲1.37	

=== Assembly Election 1990 ===
1990 Maharashtra Legislative Assembly election : Bhusawal
Party	Candidate	Votes	%	±%
INC	Phalak Nilkanth Chintaman	34,838	36.53%	▼6.44
BJP	Rajabhau Pawar	27,891	29.24%	New
JD	Dagadu Kashirm Alias Adv. D. K. Chaudhrai	17,267	18.10%	New
Independent	Surwade Nameo Rama	6,541	6.86%	New
Independent	Sonawane Murlidhar Totaram	5,200	5.45%	New
Independent	Waykole Prabhakar Sitaram	971	1.02%	New
Margin of victory		6,947	7.28%	▲3.19
Turnout		96,963	49.76%	▼3.62
Total valid votes		95,374		
Registered electors		1,94,842		▲32.10
INC gain from JP		Swing	▼10.54	

=== Assembly Election 1985 ===
1985 Maharashtra Legislative Assembly election : Bhusawal
Party	Candidate	Votes	%	±%
JP	Chaudhari Dagadu Kashiram	36,495	47.06%	▲4.81
INC	Akhatar Ali Kazi	33,321	42.97%	New
Independent	Laxman Kautik Soyanke	3,734	4.82%	New
Independent	Amtul Latif Zafarali Kazi	2,195	2.83%	New
Independent	Bhalerao Pundlik Waman	553	0.71%	New
Independent	Birhade Vasantrao Dhanaji	488	0.63%	New
Margin of victory		3,174	4.09%	▲2.33
Turnout		79,017	53.57%	▲5.58
Total valid votes		77,543		
Registered electors		1,47,493		▲12.82
JP gain from INC(I)		Swing	▲3.04	

=== Assembly Election 1980 ===
1980 Maharashtra Legislative Assembly election : Bhusawal
Party	Candidate	Votes	%	±%
INC(I)	Bagawan M. Yasin Rajmohamad	27,047	44.02%	▲21.35
JP	Chaudhari Dagadu Kashiram	25,961	42.25%	New
BJP	Parashram Yadao Waghode	7,123	11.59%	New
Independent	Tak Chunilal Pralhad	581	0.95%	New
Margin of victory		1,086	1.77%	▼8.53
Turnout		62,883	48.10%	▼9.69
Total valid votes		61,441		
Registered electors		1,30,733		▲9.37
INC(I) gain from INC		Swing	▲11.05	

=== Assembly Election 1978 ===
1978 Maharashtra Legislative Assembly election : Bhusawal
Party	Candidate	Votes	%	±%
INC	Bhole Devidas Namdeo	22,341	32.97%	▼40.82
INC(I)	Khadke Prakash Jagannath	15,362	22.67%	New
Independent	Surwade Kisan Dula	14,498	21.40%	New
Independent	Chaudhari Dagadu Kachiram	14,315	21.13%	New
Independent	Jain Narendrakumar Nanhelal	814	1.20%	New
Independent	Patel Abdul Munaf Mahibu	433	0.64%	New
Margin of victory		6,979	10.30%	▼45.42
Turnout		69,674	58.29%	▲7.15
Total valid votes		67,763		
Registered electors		1,19,536		▲17.90
INC hold		Swing	▼40.82	

=== Assembly Election 1972 ===
1972 Maharashtra Legislative Assembly election : Bhusawal
Party	Candidate	Votes	%	±%
INC	Prabhakar Senu Mahajan	37,059	73.78%	▲16.57
ABJS	Kanji Premji Joshi	9,075	18.07%	▼5.63
RPI	Satyabhamabai More	4,092	8.15%	▼2.15
Margin of victory		27,984	55.72%	▲22.20
Turnout		51,770	51.06%	▼6.22
Total valid votes		50,226		
Registered electors		1,01,386		▲14.26
INC hold		Swing	▲16.57	

=== Assembly Election 1967 ===
1967 Maharashtra Legislative Assembly election : Bhusawal
Party	Candidate	Votes	%	±%
INC	P. S. Phalak	28,305	57.21%	▲5.58
ABJS	Kanji Premji Joshi	11,723	23.69%	▲12.47
RPI	S. S. More	5,097	10.30%	▲0.95
PSP	M. G. Bhole	3,592	7.26%	▼17.6
Independent	G. T. Deore	759	1.53%	New
Margin of victory		16,582	33.52%	▲6.75
Turnout		54,001	60.86%	▲1.09
Total valid votes		49,476		
Registered electors		88,730		▲33.16
INC hold		Swing	▲5.58	

=== Assembly Election 1962 ===
1962 Maharashtra Legislative Assembly election : Bhusawal
Party	Candidate	Votes	%	±%
INC	Dattatraya Senu Bhirud	18,807	51.63%	▼3.71
PSP	Vithal Kamji Choudhari	9,058	24.86%	▼19.8
ABJS	Kashinath Shivram Sapkale	4,088	11.22%	New
RPI	Shripat Shivram Sapkale	3,408	9.36%	New
Socialist Party (India)	Makarand Prasad Kanahiya Shukla	1,068	2.93%	New
Margin of victory		9,749	26.76%	▲16.09
Turnout		39,710	59.59%	▼0.98
Total valid votes		36,429		
Registered electors		66,634		▲3.53
INC hold		Swing	▼3.71	

=== Assembly Election 1957 ===
1957 Bombay State Legislative Assembly election : Bhusawal
Party	Candidate	Votes	%	±%
INC	Dattatraya Senu Bhirud	19,819	55.34%	New
PSP	Choudhari Vithal Kamaji	15,997	44.66%	New
Margin of victory		3,822	10.67%	
Turnout		35,816	55.65%	
Total valid votes		35,816		
Registered electors		64,360		
INC hold		Swing		

== See also ==
- Bhusawal
- List of constituencies of Maharashtra Vidhan Sabha
