= Haribhau Jawale =

Indian politician (1953–2020)

Haribhau Madhav Jawale

Member of Maharashtra Legislative Assembly
- In office 2014–2019
- Preceded by: Shirish Madhukarrao Chaudhari
- Succeeded by: Shirish Madhukarrao Chaudhari
- Constituency: Raver
- In office 1999–2004
- Preceded by: Ramesh Vitthal Chaudhary
- Succeeded by: Ramesh Vitthal Chaudhary
- Constituency: Yawal

Member of Parliament, Lok Sabha
- In office 2009–2014
- Succeeded by: Raksha Khadse
- Constituency: Raver
- In office 2007–2009
- Preceded by: Y. G. Mahajan
- Succeeded by: A. T. Patil
- Constituency: Jalgaon

Personal details
- Born: 1 June 1953 Bhalod, Jalgaon district, Maharashtra
- Died: 16 June 2020 (aged 67) Bombay Hospital, Mumbai
- Party: BJP
- Spouse: Kalpana Jawale
- Children: 3 (Amol Haribhau Jawale)

Haribhau Madhav Jawale (1 June 1953 – 16 June 2020) was a politician from northern Maharashtra belonging to the Bharatiya Janata Party. He hailed from Jalgaon district in the Khandesh region of Maharashtra state.

== Political career ==
Jawale was a member of the Maharashtra Vidhan Sabha from 1999-2004. He was elected to the 14th Lok Sabha in April, 2007 in a by-election from Jalgaon constituency in Maharashtra. He was re-elected to the 15th Lok Sabha from Raver constituency in Maharashtra. In March 2014, Jawale was re-nominated for 16th Lok Sabha from Raver constituency, but a week after BJP changed its nomination to Raksha Khadse.

In October 2014, he contested the 2014 Maharashtra State Assembly election from Raver Vidhan Sabha constituency and defeated his nearest rival, Shirish Chaudhari of INC, by margin of 10,000 votes. Jawale got 65,962 votes, while Chaudhari got 55,962 votes. Jawale lost the Raver Vidhan Sabha seat in 2019 to Shirish Chaudhari. He has initiated most innovative projects in Agriculture: Banana products and Irrigation: Flood Canal Scheme: One of the largest under groundwater projects in Asia.

== Death ==
Jawale died of COVID-19 during the COVID-19 pandemic in India at the Bombay Hospital in Mumbai on 16 June 2020, fifteen days after his 67th birthday.
