= Malkapur Assembly constituency =

Assembly constituency in Maharashtra

Coordinates: 20.88°N 76.20°E

Malkapur
- Constituency No. 21 for the Maharashtra Legislative Assembly

Constituency details
- Country: India
- Region: Western India
- State: Maharashtra
- District: Buldhana
- Lok Sabha constituency: Raver
- Established: 1951
- Total electors: 288,792
- Reservation: None

Member of Legislative Assembly
- 15th Maharashtra Legislative Assembly
- Incumbent Chainsukh Sancheti
- Party: BJP
- Alliance: NDA
- Elected year: 2024

Malkapur Assembly constituency is one of the seven constituencies of Maharashtra Legislative Assembly located in the Buldhana district.

== Overview ==
It is a part of the Raver Lok Sabha constituency in the adjoining Jalgaon district along with five other assembly constituencies, viz Chopda, Raver, Bhusawal, Jamner and Muktainagar. Hence it is not a part of Buldhana Lok Sabha constituency consisting of the remaining six constituencies of Buldhana district, viz Buldhana, Chikhli, Sindkhed Raja, Mehkar, Khamgaon and Jalgaon (Jamod).

As of 2008, the extent of the constituency is the entire Nandura taluka and Malkapur taluka.

== Members of the Legislative Assembly ==
Election	Member	Party
1952	Bhiku Fikira Shelki	Indian National Congress
1952	Narayan Motiram Khakre	Independent politician
1957	Bhiku Fikira Shelki	Indian National Congress
1962	Bhiku Phakim Patil	Indian National Congress
1967	Abarao S. Deshmukh	Indian National Congress
1972	Arjun Awadhut Wankhade	Bharatiya Jana Sangh
1978	Arjun Awadhut Wankhade	Janata Party
1980	Kisanlal Nathmal Sancheti	Bharatiya Janata Party
1985	Vasantrao Ramdas Shinde	Indian National Congress
1990	Dayaram Tangade Patil	Bharatiya Janata Party
1995	Chainsukh Madanlal Sancheti	Independent politician
1999	Chainsukh Madanlal Sancheti	Bharatiya Janata Party
2004	Chainsukh Madanlal Sancheti	Bharatiya Janata Party
2009	Chainsukh Madanlal Sancheti	Bharatiya Janata Party
2014	Chainsukh Madanlal Sancheti	Bharatiya Janata Party
2019	Rajesh Panditrao Ekade	Indian National Congress
2024	Chainsukh Madanlal Sancheti	Bharatiya Janata Party

== Election results ==
=== Assembly Election 2024 ===
2024 Maharashtra Legislative Assembly election : Malkapur
Party	Candidate	Votes	%	±%
BJP	Chainsukh Madanlal Sancheti	109,921	53.24	▲14.25
INC	Rajesh Panditrao Ekade	83,524	40.46	▼6.33
VBA	Dr. Mohmmad Zameer Sabiroddin	9,316	4.51	▼2.30
NOTA	None of the above	1,045	0.51	▼0.50
Margin of victory		26,397	12.79	▲4.99
Turnout		207,489	71.85	▲2.51
Total valid votes		206,444		
Registered electors		288,792		▲7.47
BJP gain from INC		Swing	▲6.45	

=== Assembly Election 2019 ===
2019 Maharashtra Legislative Assembly election : Malkapur
Party	Candidate	Votes	%	±%
INC	Rajesh Panditrao Ekade	86,276	46.79	▲17.40
BJP	Chainsukh Madanlal Sancheti	71,892	38.99	▼6.56
VBA	Dr. Nandurkar Nitin Vasantrao	12,549	6.81	New
Independent	Gawhad Vijay Pralhad	9,876	5.36	New
NOTA	None of the above	1,854	1.01	▲0.01
Margin of victory		14,384	7.80	▼8.36
Turnout		186,326	69.34	▲2.64
Total valid votes		184,398		
Registered electors		268,718		▲6.38
INC gain from BJP		Swing	▲1.24	

=== Assembly Election 2014 ===
2014 Maharashtra Legislative Assembly election : Malkapur
Party	Candidate	Votes	%	±%
BJP	Chainsukh Madanlal Sancheti	75,965	45.55	▲5.61
INC	Dr. Arvind Vasudev Kolte	49,019	29.39	▼2.72
SS	Vasant Rambhau Bhojane	26,291	15.76	New
NCP	Santosh Sahebrao Raipure	5,741	3.44	New
BSP	Dr. Kolte Yogendra Vitthal	3,773	2.26	▲1.03
BBM	Vasantrao Sukhdeo Dandge	2,916	1.75	New
NOTA	None of the above	1,672	1.00	New
Margin of victory		26,946	16.16	▲8.33
Turnout		168,496	66.70	▼1.24
Total valid votes		166,780		
Registered electors		252,603		▲11.99
BJP hold		Swing	▲5.61	

=== Assembly Election 2009 ===
2009 Maharashtra Legislative Assembly election : Malkapur
Party	Candidate	Votes	%	±%
BJP	Chainsukh Madanlal Sancheti	61,177	39.94	▲4.06
INC	Shivchandra Tejrao Tayade	49,190	32.11	▼1.69
JSS	Harish Mahadeosingh Rawal	31,230	20.39	New
BSP	Anand Janardhan Telang	1,890	1.23	▼2.05
Independent	Hiraman Bhonaji More	1,695	1.11	New
Independent	Rajendra Wasudeo Patil	1,667	1.09	New
IUML	Sk. Anwar Haji Sk. Baba Pahelvan	1,508	0.98	New
Independent	Wakode Krishna Gunaji	1,125	0.73	New
Margin of victory		11,987	7.83	▲5.75
Turnout		153,248	67.94	▼5.11
Total valid votes		153,179		
Registered electors		225,553		▲21.30
BJP hold		Swing	▲4.06	

=== Assembly Election 2004 ===
2004 Maharashtra Legislative Assembly election : Malkapur
Party	Candidate	Votes	%	±%
BJP	Chainsukh Madanlal Sancheti	48,719	35.88	▼6.21
INC	Dr. Arvind Vasudev Kolte	45,898	33.80	▲6.74
Independent	Harish Mahadeosingh Rawal	28,881	21.27	New
BSP	Vinaykumar Premratan Mundhada	4,459	3.28	New
Independent	Sanjay Onkar Tayde	3,006	2.21	New
BBM	Gavande Dilip Rajaram	2,646	1.95	New
Margin of victory		2,821	2.08	▼12.94
Turnout		135,836	73.05	▼1.09
Total valid votes		135,781		
Registered electors		185,940		▲16.16
BJP hold		Swing	▼6.21	

=== Assembly Election 1999 ===
1999 Maharashtra Legislative Assembly election : Malkapur
Party	Candidate	Votes	%	±%
BJP	Chainsukh Madanlal Sancheti	47,192	42.09	▲29.95
INC	Jamadar Rashidkhan Yusufkhan	30,346	27.06	▲13.65
Independent	Dr. Arvind Wasudeo Kolte	16,157	14.41	New
NCP	More Sahebrao Sadashiv	16,069	14.33	New
Independent	Zambre Rambhau Tryambak	2,367	2.11	New
Margin of victory		16,846	15.02	▲4.35
Turnout		118,675	74.14	▼5.38
Total valid votes		112,131		
Registered electors		160,068		▲2.10
BJP gain from Independent		Swing	▲9.73	

=== Assembly Election 1995 ===
1995 Maharashtra Legislative Assembly election : Malkapur
Party	Candidate	Votes	%	±%
Independent	Chainsukh Madanlal Sancheti	39,492	32.36	New
JD	More Sahebrao Sadashiv	26,472	21.69	▲10.72
INC	Fundkar Totaram Sitaram	16,361	13.41	▼18.45
BJP	Tangade Dayaram Sukdeo	14,816	12.14	▼22.84
BBM	Tayade Vasant Manohar	11,122	9.11	New
Independent	Nafde Avinash Wamanrao	10,814	8.86	New
Doordarshi Party	Chaudhari Rekha Pradipkumar	902	0.74	New
Margin of victory		13,020	10.67	▲7.54
Turnout		124,674	79.52	▲10.64
Total valid votes		122,033		
Registered electors		156,774		▲10.51
Independent gain from BJP		Swing	▼2.62	

=== Assembly Election 1990 ===
1990 Maharashtra Legislative Assembly election : Malkapur
Party	Candidate	Votes	%	±%
BJP	Tangade Dayaram Sukdeo	33,578	34.98	▼7.23
INC	Kolte Dinkar Yadao	30,578	31.86	▼12.62
JD	Sharma Damodhar Nathmal	10,532	10.97	New
INS(SCS)	Lahulkar Vasantrao Narayan	9,293	9.68	New
Akhil Bhartiya Maratha Mahasangh	Patil Ganesharao Babarao	8,642	9.00	New
Independent	Chopade Narayan Suryabhan	954	0.99	New
Margin of victory		3,000	3.13	▲0.86
Turnout		97,724	68.88	▲3.45
Total valid votes		95,988		
Registered electors		141,866		▲22.51
BJP gain from INC		Swing	▼9.50	

=== Assembly Election 1985 ===
1985 Maharashtra Legislative Assembly election : Malkapur
Party	Candidate	Votes	%	±%
INC	Vasantrao Ramdas Shinde	33,042	44.48	New
BJP	Arjun Awadhut Wankhade	31,356	42.21	▲7.40
Independent	Wakode Tulshiram Somaji	7,064	9.51	New
Independent	More Murlidhar Mahadu	1,077	1.45	New
RPI	Shinde Suryabhan Maroti	1,011	1.36	▼1.74
Margin of victory		1,686	2.27	▼3.50
Turnout		75,770	65.43	▲0.84
Total valid votes		74,291		
Registered electors		115,795		▲7.85
INC gain from BJP		Swing	▲9.67	

=== Assembly Election 1980 ===
1980 Maharashtra Legislative Assembly election : Malkapur
Party	Candidate	Votes	%	±%
BJP	Sancheti Kisanlal Nathmal	23,581	34.81	New
INC(I)	Mundhada Vinaykumar Premratan	19,674	29.04	▼9.94
INC(U)	Deshmukh Abarao Suprao	19,099	28.19	New
RPI	Wagh Bhaskar Somaji	2,103	3.10	New
Independent	Bathe Bhanudas Ramchandra	1,127	1.66	New
Independent	Ingale Dagdu Shamrao	738	1.09	New
Independent	Abdul Majeed Abdul Qadder	573	0.85	New
Margin of victory		3,907	5.77	▼1.20
Turnout		69,343	64.59	▼12.83
Total valid votes		67,746		
Registered electors		107,364		▲6.99
BJP gain from JP		Swing	▼11.14	

=== Assembly Election 1978 ===
1978 Maharashtra Legislative Assembly election : Malkapur
Party	Candidate	Votes	%	±%
JP	Arjun Awadhut Wankhade	34,663	45.95	New
INC(I)	Mundhada Vinaykumar Premratan	29,406	38.98	New
INC	Patil Ramesh Bhagwan	11,369	15.07	▼31.76
Margin of victory		5,257	6.97	▲5.05
Turnout		77,688	77.42	▲9.45
Total valid votes		75,438		
Registered electors		100,347		▲8.12
JP gain from ABJS		Swing	▼2.80	

=== Assembly Election 1972 ===
1972 Maharashtra Legislative Assembly election : Malkapur
Party	Candidate	Votes	%	±%
ABJS	Arjun Awadhut Wankhade	29,812	48.75	▲10.90
INC	J. Rao M. Rao Jadhav	28,635	46.83	▲1.67
Independent	Salamkhan Daudkhan	1,732	2.83	New
Independent	Ramchandra Sampat Borde	968	1.58	New
Margin of victory		1,177	1.92	▼5.40
Turnout		63,080	67.97	▼5.04
Total valid votes		61,147		
Registered electors		92,811		▲8.46
ABJS gain from INC		Swing	▲3.59	

=== Assembly Election 1967 ===
1967 Maharashtra Legislative Assembly election : Malkapur
Party	Candidate	Votes	%	±%
INC	Abarao S. Deshmukh	26,733	45.16	▲1.31
ABJS	Arjun Awadhut Wankhade	22,402	37.85	New
RPI	S. K. Kalaskar	7,985	13.49	New
SWA	B. S. Patil	662	1.12	New
PSP	K. K. S. K. K. Kubroddin	420	0.71	New
Independent	A. P. Wankhade	417	0.70	New
Margin of victory		4,331	7.32	▼7.15
Turnout		62,476	73.01	▼0.32
Total valid votes		59,193		
Registered electors		85,569		▲14.64
INC hold		Swing	▲1.31	

=== Assembly Election 1962 ===
1962 Maharashtra Legislative Assembly election : Malkapur
Party	Candidate	Votes	%	±%
INC	Bhiku Phakim Patil	22,808	43.85	▼14.15
ABJS	Waman Tukaram Naphade	15,281	29.38	New
Independent	K. Kh. Salahodin	6,215	11.95	New
PWPI	Shaligram Shioram Shiral	6,055	11.64	New
Independent	Sugdeo Vishnu Kharate	1,030	1.98	New
Independent	Tukaram Sudama Ingle	630	1.21	New
Margin of victory		7,527	14.47	▼13.70
Turnout		54,730	73.33	▲9.58
Total valid votes		52,019		
Registered electors		74,640		▲8.03
INC hold		Swing	▼14.15	

=== Assembly Election 1957 ===
1957 Bombay State Legislative Assembly election : Malkapur
Party	Candidate	Votes	%	±%
INC	Bhiku Fikira Shelki	25,544	58.00	▲5.32
ABJS	Nafade Waman Tukaram	13,135	29.82	▲25.25
Independent	Kalaskar Kashiram Motiram	5,366	12.18	New
Margin of victory		12,409	28.17	▼18.03
Turnout		44,045	63.75	▲4.91
Total valid votes		44,045		
Registered electors		69,091		▲32.93
INC hold		Swing	▲5.32	

=== Assembly Election 1952 ===
1952 Madhya Pradesh Legislative Assembly election : Malkapur
Party	Candidate	Votes	%	±%
INC	Bhiku Fikira Shelki	16,112	52.68	New
Independent	Narayan Motiram Khakre	11,089	36.26	New
Socialist	Damodhar Tukaram Warade	1,984	6.49	New
ABJS	Gulabrao Bhaurao Metkar	1,397	4.57	New
Margin of victory		14,128	46.20	
Turnout		30,582	58.84	
Total valid votes		30,582		
Registered electors		51,975		
INC win (new seat)				

== See also ==
- Nandura
- Malkapur, Buldhana
