= Chopda Assembly constituency =

Assembly constituency in Maharashtra, India

Coordinates: 21°14′39.99″N 75°17′00.90″E

Chopda
- Constituency No. 10 for the Maharashtra Legislative Assembly

Constituency details
- Country: India
- Region: Western India
- State: Maharashtra
- District: Jalgaon
- Lok Sabha constituency: Raver
- Established: 1951
- Total electors: 331,891
- Reservation: ST

Member of Legislative Assembly
- 15th Maharashtra Legislative Assembly
- Incumbent Chandrakant Sonawane
- Party: SHS
- Alliance: NDA
- Elected year: 2024

Chopda Assembly constituency is one of the 288 Vidhan Sabha constituencies of Maharashtra state in western India. This constituency is located in the Jalgaon district and it is reserved for the candidates belonging to Scheduled tribes. It is currently held by Chandrakant Badiram Sonawane of the Shivsena.

== Overview ==
It is part of the Raver Lok Sabha constituency along with another five Vidhan Sabha segments, namely Bhusawal, Jamner, Muktainagar and Raver in Jalgaon district and Malkapur in adjoining Buldhana district.

After the passing of the Delimitation of Parliamentary and Assembly constituencies Order, 2008, Chopda Assembly constituency is composed of the following: 1. Chopda Tehsil, 2.Yawal Tehsil (Part), Revenue Circle – Kingaon and Sakali of Jalgaon district.

== Members of the Legislative Assembly ==
Election	Member	Party
1952	Madhavrao Gotto Patil	Indian National Congress
1962	Deorao Madhavrao Nikam	Indian National Congress
1967	M. N. Gujrathi	Independent politician
1972	Sharadchandrika Suresh Patil	Indian National Congress
1978	Madhavrao Kautik Chaudhari	Janata Party
1980	Sharadchandrika Suresh Patil	Indian National Congress (I)
1985	Arunlal Gowardhandas Gujrathi	Indian Congress (Socialist)
1990	Arunlal Gowardhandas Gujrathi	Indian National Congress
1995	Arunlal Gowardhandas Gujrathi	Indian National Congress
1999	Arunlal Gowardhandas Gujrathi	Nationalist Congress Party
2004	Kailas Gorakh Patil	Shiv Sena
2009	Jagdishchandra Ramesh Valvi	Nationalist Congress Party
2014	Chandrakant Sonawane	Shiv Sena
2019	Latabai Sonawane	Shiv Sena
2024	Chandrakant Sonawane	Shiv Sena

== Election results ==
=== Assembly Election 2024 ===
2024 Maharashtra Legislative Assembly election : Chopda
Party	Candidate	Votes	%	±%
SS	Chandrakant Sonawane	122,826	55.79	▲16.18
SS(UBT)	Prabhakar Aappa Gotu Sonawane	90,513	41.11	New
NOTA	None of the above	2,420	1.10	
Independent	Hiralal Suresh Koli	2,118	0.96	New
BAP	Sunil Tukaram Bhil	1,601	0.73	New
Margin of victory		32,313	14.68	▲4.27
Turnout		222,588	67.07	▲2.39
Total valid votes		220,168		
Registered electors		331,891		▲7.60
SS hold		Swing	▲16.18	

=== Assembly Election 2019 ===
2019 Maharashtra Legislative Assembly election : Chopda
Party	Candidate	Votes	%	±%
SS	Latabai Sonawane	78,137	39.61	▲10.30
NCP	Jagdishchandra Ramesh Valvi	57,608	29.21	▲6.36
Independent	Prabhakar Aappa Gotu Sonawane	32,459	16.46	New
Independent	Dr. Barela Chandrakant Jamsing	17,085	8.66	New
BSP	Adv. Yakub Sahebu Tadavi	5,369	2.72	New
Independent	Madhuri Kishor Patil	4,288	2.17	New
NOTA	None of the above	2,175	1.10	▼0.46
Independent	Ishwarlal Suresh Koli (Alias Nilesh Suresh Koli)	1,529	0.78	New
Margin of victory		20,529	10.41	▲3.95
Turnout		199,502	64.68	▼2.66
Total valid votes		197,243		
Registered electors		308,441		▲10.64
SS hold		Swing	▲10.30	

=== Assembly Election 2014 ===
2014 Maharashtra Legislative Assembly election : Chopda
Party	Candidate	Votes	%	±%
SS	Chandrakant Sonawane	54,176	29.31	▼4.67
NCP	Patil Madhuri Kishor	42,241	22.85	▼20.33
BJP	Jagdishchandra Ramesh Valvi	30,559	16.53	New
Independent	Dr. Barela Chandrakant Jamsing	24,506	13.26	New
MNS	Itbar A. Tadavi	18,536	10.03	▼1.94
INC	Bhadale Dnyaneshwar Raysing	10,280	5.56	New
NOTA	None of the above	2,885	1.56	New
Independent	Dilip Anandsing Mahale	2,295	1.24	New
Margin of victory		11,935	6.46	▼2.74
Turnout		187,730	67.34	▲3.62
Total valid votes		184,836		
Registered electors		278,782		▲10.08
SS gain from NCP		Swing	▼13.87	

=== Assembly Election 2009 ===
2009 Maharashtra Legislative Assembly election : Chopda
Party	Candidate	Votes	%	±%
NCP	Jagdishchandra Ramesh Walvi (Jagdishbhau)	69,636	43.18	▲1.94
SS	Salunke Dnyaneshwar Pitambar (D. P. Salunke Sir)	54,798	33.98	▼18.44
MNS	Dr. Barela Chandrakant Jamsing	19,298	11.97	New
CPI	Mujat Bondar Tadvi Alias M. B. Tadvi Sir	9,632	5.97	▲5.04
Independent	Salunkhe Madhukar Manga (Pardhi) Pen. Dy. Coller.	3,248	2.01	New
BSP	Harish Kumar Himmat Pawar (Bhau)	2,616	1.62	▼0.74
Independent	Eknath Dashrath Pawar	1,245	0.77	New
Margin of victory		14,838	9.20	▼1.98
Turnout		161,382	63.72	▼13.56
Total valid votes		161,269		
Registered electors		253,260		▲41.06
NCP gain from SS		Swing	▼9.24	

=== Assembly Election 2004 ===
2004 Maharashtra Legislative Assembly election : Chopda
Party	Candidate	Votes	%	±%
SS	Patil Kailas Gorakh	72,715	52.42	▲15.75
NCP	Arunlal Gowardhandas Gujrathi	57,209	41.24	▲2.42
BSP	Dnyaneshwar Pitambar Salunke	3,273	2.36	New
Independent	Murlidhar Patil	2,063	1.49	New
CPI	Mahajan Amrutrao Tukaram	1,292	0.93	New
Margin of victory		15,506	11.18	▲9.03
Turnout		138,754	77.28	▲9.58
Total valid votes		138,710		
Registered electors		179,540		▲14.98
SS gain from NCP		Swing	▲13.60	

=== Assembly Election 1999 ===
1999 Maharashtra Legislative Assembly election : Chopda
Party	Candidate	Votes	%	±%
NCP	Arunlal Gowardhandas Gujrathi	38,135	38.82	New
SS	Patil Kailas Gorakh	36,025	36.67	▲7.22
INC	Patil Lahu Hiraji	16,189	16.48	▼28.08
Independent	Baviskar Jagannath Tulshiram	7,887	8.03	New
Margin of victory		2,110	2.15	▼12.97
Turnout		105,722	67.70	▼6.14
Total valid votes		98,236		
Registered electors		156,155		▲2.20
NCP gain from INC		Swing	▼5.74	

=== Assembly Election 1995 ===
1995 Maharashtra Legislative Assembly election : Chopda
Party	Candidate	Votes	%	±%
INC	Arunlal Gowardhandas Gujrathi	48,359	44.56	▼14.05
SS	Patil Kailas Gorakh	31,955	29.45	▲9.51
Independent	Patil Indirabai Bhanudas	16,390	15.10	New
Independent	Konge Damodhar Kashinath	4,073	3.75	New
JD	Shirsat Pandurang Narayan	2,718	2.50	▼2.46
Independent	Shirsat Rajendra Abhiman	1,509	1.39	New
Independent	Mahajan Amrutrao Tukaram	1,498	1.38	New
BBM	Shirsat Suresh Manganlal	1,088	1.00	New
Margin of victory		16,404	15.12	▼23.55
Turnout		112,821	73.84	▲3.95
Total valid votes		108,521		
Registered electors		152,796		▲11.50
INC hold		Swing	▼14.05	

=== Assembly Election 1990 ===
1990 Maharashtra Legislative Assembly election : Chopda
Party	Candidate	Votes	%	±%
INC	Arunlal Gowardhandas Gujrathi	54,805	58.61	▲19.89
SS	Rana Ganesh Jagannath	18,644	19.94	New
INS(SCS)	Patil Bhimrao Bhurao	12,551	13.42	New
JD	Patil Indirabai Bhanudas	4,634	4.96	New
Independent	Baviskar Ashok Rajaam	584	0.62	New
Margin of victory		36,161	38.67	▲21.01
Turnout		95,778	69.89	▼3.63
Total valid votes		93,511		
Registered electors		137,041		▲23.57
INC gain from IC(S)		Swing	▲2.23	

=== Assembly Election 1985 ===
1985 Maharashtra Legislative Assembly election : Chopda
Party	Candidate	Votes	%	±%
IC(S)	Arunlal Gowardhandas Gujrathi	44,972	56.38	New
INC	Suresh G. Patil	30,887	38.72	New
Independent	Baviskar Tukaram Narayan	1,611	2.02	New
CPI	Mahajan Amrutrao Tukaram	1,148	1.44	New
Independent	Patil Sitaram Onkar	683	0.86	New
Margin of victory		14,085	17.66	▼5.28
Turnout		81,532	73.52	▲11.55
Total valid votes		79,761		
Registered electors		110,899		▲8.34
IC(S) gain from INC(I)		Swing	▼4.30	

=== Assembly Election 1980 ===
1980 Maharashtra Legislative Assembly election : Chopda
Party	Candidate	Votes	%	±%
INC(I)	Sharadchandrika Suresh Patil	37,435	60.68	▲36.26
INC(U)	Devraj Sitaram Goba	23,280	37.73	New
Independent	Soneri Shantaram Gangadhar	496	0.80	New
Independent	Danej Gulab Ramdas	484	0.78	New
Margin of victory		14,155	22.94	▲22.46
Turnout		63,433	61.97	▼10.59
Total valid votes		61,695		
Registered electors		102,364		▲8.97
INC(I) gain from JP		Swing	▲24.64	

=== Assembly Election 1978 ===
1978 Maharashtra Legislative Assembly election : Chopda
Party	Candidate	Votes	%	±%
JP	Chaudhari Madhavrao Kautik	23,637	36.04	New
INC	Patil Dhoundu Ukhaji	23,322	35.56	▼43.84
INC(I)	Sonawane Murlidhar Totaram	16,016	24.42	New
PWPI	Thakre Bhagwat Pahuji	2,098	3.20	▼2.43
Independent	Bhoi Dagadu Maharu	512	0.78	New
Margin of victory		315	0.48	▼66.89
Turnout		68,159	72.56	▲11.43
Total valid votes		65,585		
Registered electors		93,939		▲2.59
JP gain from INC		Swing	▼43.36	

=== Assembly Election 1972 ===
1972 Maharashtra Legislative Assembly election : Chopda
Party	Candidate	Votes	%	±%
INC	Sharadchandrika Suresh Patil	42,125	79.40	▲36.81
ABJS	Bhimrao Sahebrao Patil	6,382	12.03	New
PWPI	Bhagawatpahuji Thakare	2,987	5.63	▼8.36
RPI(K)	Vajirshamu Mahar	1,557	2.93	New
Margin of victory		35,743	67.37	▲66.54
Turnout		55,971	61.13	▼11.30
Total valid votes		53,051		
Registered electors		91,568		▲6.47
INC gain from Independent		Swing	▲35.98	

=== Assembly Election 1967 ===
1967 Maharashtra Legislative Assembly election : Chopda
Party	Candidate	Votes	%	±%
Independent	M. N. Gujrathi	24,477	43.42	New
INC	S. S. Patil	24,011	42.59	▼25.08
PWPI	D. M. Tayade	7,890	13.99	▼1.21
Margin of victory		466	0.83	▼51.64
Turnout		62,288	72.43	▲7.15
Total valid votes		56,378		
Registered electors		86,002		▲13.87
Independent gain from INC		Swing	▼24.25	

=== Assembly Election 1962 ===
1962 Maharashtra Legislative Assembly election : Chopda
Party	Candidate	Votes	%	±%
INC	Deorao Madhavrao Nikam	30,352	67.67	▲13.12
PWPI	Dasharath Hiraman Tayade	6,818	15.20	New
ABJS	Bhagwan Hamdeo Mahajan	6,267	13.97	New
Independent	Suklal Vithoba Bari	1,415	3.15	New
Margin of victory		23,534	52.47	▲40.59
Turnout		49,302	65.28	▼1.43
Total valid votes		44,852		
Registered electors		75,524		▲36.70
INC hold		Swing	▲13.12	

=== Assembly Election 1952 ===
1952 Bombay State Legislative Assembly election : Chopda
Party	Candidate	Votes	%	±%
INC	Patil Madhavrao Gotto	20,105	54.55	New
Independent	Patil Narhar Rajaram	15,725	42.67	New
Kamgar Kisan Paksha	Patil Vyankatrao Bhaga	1,026	2.78	New
Margin of victory		4,380	11.88	
Turnout		36,856	66.71	
Total valid votes		36,856		
Registered electors		55,248		
INC win (new seat)				

== See also ==
- Chopda
- List of constituencies of Maharashtra Vidhan Sabha
