= Shirish Madhukarrao Chaudhari =

Indian politician

Member of Maharashtra Legislative Assembly
- In office (2009-2014), (2019 – 2024)
- Preceded by: Arun Pandurang Patil
- Succeeded by: Amol Haribhau Jawale
- Constituency: Raver

Personal details
- Born: 23 May 1959 (age 67) Khiroda Pr Yawal, Raver, Jalgaon District
- Party: Indian National Congress
- Children: Dhananjay Shirish Chaudhari
- Parent: Late. Madhukarrao alias Balasaheb Chaudhari
- Profession: Politician

Shirish Madhukarrao Chaudhari (born 23 May 1959) is an Indian politician serving in the Maharashtra Legislative Assembly since 2019. A member of the Indian National Congress, he represents the Raver Assembly constituency.
