= Yawal Assembly constituency =

Constituency of the Maharashtra legislative assembly in India

Yawal
- Former constituency for the Maharashtra Legislative Assembly

Constituency details
- Country: India
- Region: Western India
- State: Maharashtra
- Established: 1952
- Abolished: 2008
- Total electors: 1,67,900

Yawal Assembly constituency was an assembly constituency in the India state of Maharashtra.

== Members of the Legislative Assembly ==
Election	Member	Party
1952	Patil Vithalrao Nathu	Indian National Congress
1957	Ramabai Narayan Deshpande	Indian National Congress
1962	Ramabai Narayan Deshpande	Indian National Congress
1967	Jivaram Tukaram Mahajan	Indian National Congress
1972	Jivaram Tukaram Mahajan	Indian National Congress
1978	Choudhari Sindhu Parth	Janata Party
1980	Jivaram Tukaram Mahajan	Indian National Congress
1985	Jivaram Tukaram Mahajan	Indian National Congress
1990	Chaudhary Ramesh Vitthal	Indian National Congress
1995	Chaudhary Ramesh Vitthal	Indian National Congress
1999	Haribhau Madhao Jawale	Bharatiya Janata Party
2004	Chaudhary Ramesh Vitthal	Indian National Congress

== Election results ==
=== Assembly Election 2004 ===
2004 Maharashtra Legislative Assembly election : Yawal
Party	Candidate	Votes	%	±%
INC	Chaudhary Ramesh Vitthal	51,148	45.95%	▲6.28
BJP	Jawale Haribhau Madhav	46,726	41.98%	▲1.88
Independent	Vilas Nemichand Jain	7,007	6.30%	New
BSP	Sanjay Prabhakar Tawade	3,786	3.40%	New
Independent	Tayade Jayram Dagadu	979	0.88%	New
Margin of victory		4,422	3.97%	▲3.54
Turnout		111,543	66.43%	▼1.74
Total valid votes		111,307		
Registered electors		167,900		▲12.68
INC gain from BJP		Swing	▲5.85	

=== Assembly Election 1999 ===
1999 Maharashtra Legislative Assembly election : Yawal
Party	Candidate	Votes	%	±%
BJP	Haribhau Madhao Jawale	38,227	40.10%	▲3.18
INC	Chaudhary Ramesh Vitthal	37,815	39.67%	▼1.02
NCP	Chaudhari Ulhas Nimba	13,011	13.65%	New
Independent	Salunke Subhash Gendu	5,793	6.08%	New
Margin of victory		412	0.43%	▼3.33
Turnout		101,584	68.17%	▼7.95
Total valid votes		95,320		
Registered electors		149,010		▲0.67
BJP gain from INC		Swing	▼0.59	

=== Assembly Election 1995 ===
1995 Maharashtra Legislative Assembly election : Yawal
Party	Candidate	Votes	%	±%
INC	Chaudhary Ramesh Vitthal	44,077	40.69%	▼8.06
BJP	Arun Govinda Mahajan	40,000	36.92%	▼4.13
BBM	Salunke Subhash Gendu	11,431	10.55%	New
JD	Chaudhary Diwakar Shrawan	5,547	5.12%	▼0.51
AIML	Uday Baburao Chaudhary	2,016	1.86%	New
Independent	Khushal Ramu Mahajan	1,620	1.50%	New
Margin of victory		4,077	3.76%	▼3.95
Turnout		112,676	76.12%	▲8.30
Total valid votes		108,329		
Registered electors		148,016		▲7.22
INC hold		Swing	▼8.06	

=== Assembly Election 1990 ===
1990 Maharashtra Legislative Assembly election : Yawal
Party	Candidate	Votes	%	±%
INC	Chaudhary Ramesh Vitthal	44,668	48.75%	▼5.29
BJP	Arun Govinda Mahajan	37,607	41.05%	New
JD	Diwakar Shrawan Chaudhari	5,159	5.63%	New
Hindustan Janta Party	Kashinatn Motiram Patil	3,506	3.83%	New
Margin of victory		7,061	7.71%	▼14.90
Turnout		93,618	67.82%	▲12.26
Total valid votes		91,622		
Registered electors		138,045		▲23.17
INC hold		Swing	▼5.29	

=== Assembly Election 1985 ===
1985 Maharashtra Legislative Assembly election : Yawal
Party	Candidate	Votes	%	±%
INC	Jivaram Tukaram Mahajan	32,685	54.04%	New
JP	Borole Yashwant Mansaram	19,009	31.43%	New
LKD	Hamid Tadvi	2,695	4.46%	New
Independent	Medhe Bhimrao Kautik	2,234	3.69%	New
Independent	Patil Kashiram Motiram	1,423	2.35%	New
Independent	Sonawane Prabhakar Jangalu	1,292	2.14%	New
Independent	Ingale Ramesh Chatru	646	1.07%	New
Margin of victory		13,676	22.61%	▲11.78
Turnout		62,272	55.56%	▼5.49
Total valid votes		60,484		
Registered electors		112,075		▲5.26
INC gain from INC(U)		Swing	▲5.59	

=== Assembly Election 1980 ===
1980 Maharashtra Legislative Assembly election : Yawal
Party	Candidate	Votes	%	±%
INC(U)	Jivaram Tukaram Mahajan	30,503	48.45%	New
INC(I)	Chaudhary Ramesh Vitthal	23,686	37.62%	▲7.98
Independent	Tadvi Mirabai Dagekha	6,167	9.79%	New
[[Janata Party (Secular) Raj Narain|Janata Party (Secular) Raj Narain]]	Tadvi Hamid Vajir	1,059	1.68%	New
Independent	Patil Kashiram Motiram	589	0.94%	New
Independent	Deshmukh Gangadhar Nathu	560	0.89%	New
Margin of victory		6,817	10.83%	▲4.18
Turnout		64,997	61.05%	▼7.31
Total valid votes		62,962		
Registered electors		106,471		▲6.11
INC(U) gain from JP		Swing	▲12.16	

=== Assembly Election 1978 ===
1978 Maharashtra Legislative Assembly election : Yawal
Party	Candidate	Votes	%	±%
JP	Choudhari Sindhu Parth	24,021	36.29%	New
INC(I)	Tadvi Mirabai Dagekha	19,617	29.64%	New
INC	Jivaram Tukaram Mahajan	17,583	26.56%	▼39.75
Independent	Patil Kashiram Motiram	2,285	3.45%	New
Independent	Tayde Manohar Rajaram	1,726	2.61%	New
Independent	Sonwane Lotu Onkar	958	1.45%	New
Margin of victory		4,404	6.65%	▼25.97
Turnout		68,586	68.36%	▲12.63
Total valid votes		66,190		
Registered electors		100,336		▲21.03
JP gain from INC		Swing	▼30.02	

=== Assembly Election 1972 ===
1972 Maharashtra Legislative Assembly election : Yawal
Party	Candidate	Votes	%	±%
INC	Jivaram Tukaram Mahajan	29,567	66.31%	▲13.37
SSP	Kashinatn Motiram Patil	15,022	33.69%	New
Margin of victory		14,545	32.62%	▲3.36
Turnout		46,200	55.73%	▼16.25
Total valid votes		44,589		
Registered electors		82,901		▲10.57
INC hold		Swing	▲13.37	

=== Assembly Election 1967 ===
1967 Maharashtra Legislative Assembly election : Yawal
Party	Candidate	Votes	%	±%
INC	Jivaram Tukaram Mahajan	26,474	52.94%	▲10.09
PSP	Ganpat Bhavadu Mahajan	11,842	23.68%	▼17.64
SSP	B. A. Patil	5,825	11.65%	New
ABJS	V. G. Chaudhari	4,260	8.52%	New
SWA	V. N. Patil	1,602	3.20%	New
Margin of victory		14,632	29.26%	▲27.73
Turnout		53,970	71.98%	▲10.16
Total valid votes		50,003		
Registered electors		74,978		▲14.02
INC hold		Swing	▲10.09	

=== Assembly Election 1962 ===
1962 Maharashtra Legislative Assembly election : Yawal
Party	Candidate	Votes	%	±%
INC	Ramabai Narayan Deshpande	15,809	42.85%	▼14.15
PSP	Ganpat Bhavadu Mahajan	15,246	41.32%	▼1.68
ABJS	Shenfadu Deoram Patil	3,098	8.40%	New
CPI	Ekanath Tukaram Patil	2,743	7.43%	New
Margin of victory		563	1.53%	▼12.46
Turnout		40,652	61.82%	▼4.40
Total valid votes		36,896		
Registered electors		65,761		▲4.08
INC hold		Swing	▼14.15	

=== Assembly Election 1957 ===
1957 Bombay State Legislative Assembly election : Yawal
Party	Candidate	Votes	%	±%
INC	Deshpande Ramabai Narayan	23,848	57.00%	▼7.71
PSP	Borole Yeshwant Mansaram	17,993	43.00%	New
Margin of victory		5,855	13.99%	▼32.71
Turnout		41,841	66.22%	▲4.47
Total valid votes		41,841		
Registered electors		63,182		▲9.19
INC hold		Swing	▼7.71	

=== Assembly Election 1952 ===
1952 Bombay State Legislative Assembly election : Yawal
Party	Candidate	Votes	%	±%
INC	Patil Vithalrao Nathu	23,118	64.71%	New
Kamgar Kisan Paksha	Patil Vyankatrao Bhaga	6,433	18.01%	New
Socialist	Patil Nikanth Shripat	6,177	17.29%	New
Margin of victory		16,685	46.70%	
Turnout		35,728	61.75%	
Total valid votes		35,728		
Registered electors		57,863		
INC win (new seat)				
