= Raver Assembly constituency =

Assembly constituency in Maharashtra

Coordinates: 21.24°N 76.03°E

Raver
- Constituency No. 11 for the Maharashtra Legislative Assembly

Constituency details
- Country: India
- Region: Western India
- State: Maharashtra
- District: Jalgaon
- Lok Sabha constituency: Raver
- Established: 1951
- Total electors: 309,790
- Reservation: None

Member of Legislative Assembly
- 15th Maharashtra Legislative Assembly
- Incumbent Amol Haribhau Jawale
- Party: BJP
- Alliance: NDA
- Elected year: 2024

Raver Assembly constituency is one of the 288 Vidhan Sabha (Legislative Assembly) constituencies of Maharashtra state in western India. This constituency is located in Jalgaon district.

== Overview ==
Raver is part of Raver Lok Sabha constituency along with five other Vidhan Sabha constituencies, namely Bhusawal, Chopda, Muktainagar and Jamner in Jalgaon district and Malkapur in adjoining Buldhana district.

== Members of the Legislative Assembly ==
Election	Member	Party
1952	Bonde Dhanji Maharu	Indian National Congress
1957	Wankhede Keshavrao Raghoo	Indian National Congress
1957	Mahukar Dhanaji Chaudhari	Indian National Congress
1962	Mahukar Dhanaji Chaudhari	Indian National Congress
1967	Mahukar Dhanaji Chaudhari	Indian National Congress
1972	Mahukar Dhanaji Chaudhari	Indian National Congress
1978	Mahukar Dhanaji Chaudhari	Indian National Congress
1980	Ramkrishan Raghunath Patil	Indian National Congress
1985	Dr. Gunwantrao Rambhau Sarode	Bharatiya Janata Party
1990	Mahukar Dhanaji Chaudhari	Indian National Congress
1995	Arun Pandurang Patil	Bharatiya Janata Party
1999	Mahajan Rajaram Ganu	Indian National Congress
2004	Arun Pandurang Patil	Bharatiya Janata Party
2009	Shirish Madhukarrao Chaudhari	Independent politician
2014	Haribhau Jawale	Bharatiya Janata Party
2019	Shirish Madhukarrao Chaudhari	Indian National Congress
2024	Amol Haribhau Jawale	Bharatiya Janata Party

== Election results ==
=== Assembly Election 2024 ===
2024 Maharashtra Legislative Assembly election : Raver
Party	Candidate	Votes	%	±%
BJP	Amol Haribhau Jawale	113,676	49.61%	▲18.67
INC	Chaudhari Dhananjay Shirish	70,114	30.60%	▼8.09
PHJSP	Anil Chhabildas Chaudhari	25,170	10.99%	New
Independent	Dara Mohammad Jafar Mohammad	9,814	4.28%	New
VBA	Shameebha Bhanudas Patil	8,453	3.69%	▲0.36
NOTA	None of the above	1,477	0.64%	▼0.33
Margin of victory		43,562	19.01%	▲11.26
Turnout		230,600	74.44%	▲5.10
Total valid votes		229,123		
Registered electors		309,790		▲5.59
BJP gain from INC		Swing	▲10.92	

=== Assembly Election 2019 ===
2019 Maharashtra Legislative Assembly election : Raver
Party	Candidate	Votes	%	±%
INC	Shirish Madhukarrao Chaudhari	77,941	38.69%	▲7.95
BJP	Haribhau Madhav Jawale	62,332	30.94%	▼5.29
Independent	Anil Chabildas Chawadari	44,841	22.26%	New
VBA	Haji Sayad Mushtak Sayad Kamaruddin	6,707	3.33%	New
AIMIM	Vivek Devidas Thakare (Bapu Dhobi)	3,545	1.76%	New
Independent	Gayasoddin Sadaroddin Kazi	2,693	1.34%	New
NOTA	None of the above	1,946	0.97%	▲0.02
Independent	D. D. Wani (Photographer)	1,333	0.66%	New
Margin of victory		15,609	7.75%	▲2.26
Turnout		203,428	69.34%	▲2.52
Total valid votes		201,450		
Registered electors		293,382		▲6.63
INC gain from BJP		Swing	▲2.46	

=== Assembly Election 2014 ===
2014 Maharashtra Legislative Assembly election : Raver
Party	Candidate	Votes	%	±%
BJP	Haribhau Jawale	65,962	36.23%	▲15.03
INC	Chaudhari Shirish Madhukarrao	55,962	30.74%	▲12.11
NCP	Abdul Gaffar Malik	31,271	17.18%	New
SS	Mahajan Pralhad Ramdas	14,928	8.20%	New
Independent	Ishwar Pundlik Tayde	4,019	2.21%	New
BSP	Sapkale Pradip Bhimrao	2,828	1.55%	▼8.91
WPOI	Shaikh Rauf Hafij	1,970	1.08%	New
NOTA	None of the above	1,722	0.95%	New
Margin of victory		10,000	5.49%	▼8.52
Turnout		183,856	66.82%	▲4.08
Total valid votes		182,043		
Registered electors		275,136		▲12.30
BJP gain from Independent		Swing	▲1.02	

=== Assembly Election 2009 ===
2009 Maharashtra Legislative Assembly election : Raver
Party	Candidate	Votes	%	±%
Independent	Shirish Madhukarrao Chaudhari	54,115	35.21%	New
BJP	Shobhatai Vilas Patil	32,579	21.20%	▼26.42
INC	Chaudhari Ramesh Viththal	28,638	18.63%	▼20.47
BSP	Patil Ramesh Nagaraj	16,085	10.46%	▲4.32
Independent	Bharat Totaram Mahajan	6,953	4.52%	New
Independent	Sopan Baburao Patil	5,107	3.32%	New
Independent	Wani D. D. (Photographer) (Dhyaneshwar Diwakar Wani)	3,551	2.31%	New
BBM	Kachhi Karim Kasam	1,419	0.92%	New
Margin of victory		21,536	14.01%	▲5.49
Turnout		153,712	62.74%	▼7.97
Total valid votes		153,708		
Registered electors		244,991		▲34.96
Independent gain from BJP		Swing	▼12.41	

=== Assembly Election 2004 ===
2004 Maharashtra Legislative Assembly election : Raver
Party	Candidate	Votes	%	±%
BJP	Arun Pandurang Patil	61,111	47.62%	▲10.12
INC	D. K. Mahajan	50,180	39.10%	▼4.28
BSP	Shaikh Allauddin Shaikh Rashid	7,884	6.14%	New
Independent	Wani Rajendra Motlilal	4,644	3.62%	New
Independent	D. D. Wani (Photographer)	1,711	1.33%	New
Margin of victory		10,931	8.52%	▲2.64
Turnout		128,369	70.71%	▼1.41
Total valid votes		128,343		
Registered electors		181,532		▲12.15
BJP gain from INC		Swing	▲4.24	

=== Assembly Election 1999 ===
1999 Maharashtra Legislative Assembly election : Raver
Party	Candidate	Votes	%	±%
INC	Mahajan Rajaram Ganu	47,719	43.38%	▲2.56
BJP	Arun Pandurang Patil	41,251	37.50%	▼7.49
NCP	Shirish Madhukarrao Chaudhary	20,588	18.72%	New
Margin of victory		6,468	5.88%	▲1.71
Turnout		116,732	72.12%	▼7.65
Total valid votes		110,001		
Registered electors		161,865		▲0.21
INC gain from BJP		Swing	▼1.61	

=== Assembly Election 1995 ===
1995 Maharashtra Legislative Assembly election : Raver
Party	Candidate	Votes	%	±%
BJP	Arun Pandurang Patil	55,897	44.99%	▲10.19
INC	Mahukar Dhanaji Chaudhari	50,714	40.82%	▲1.03
BSP	Ad. Tadvi Yakub Sayabu	12,039	9.69%	▲9.45
JD	Sk. Nisar Sk. Rajjak	1,485	1.20%	New
Independent	Kambale Dilip Tanbaji	1,295	1.04%	New
Doordarshi Party	Patil Sandhya Pritamsing	909	0.73%	▲0.29
Margin of victory		5,183	4.17%	▼0.82
Turnout		128,843	79.77%	▲7.04
Total valid votes		124,235		
Registered electors		161,522		▲9.15
BJP gain from INC		Swing	▲5.20	

=== Assembly Election 1990 ===
1990 Maharashtra Legislative Assembly election : Raver
Party	Candidate	Votes	%	±%
INC	Mahukar Dhanaji Chaudhari	42,116	39.79%	▲6.14
BJP	Gunwant Rambhan Sarode	36,837	34.80%	▼5.76
INS(SCS)	Patil. L. K	25,225	23.83%	New
Margin of victory		5,279	4.99%	▼1.92
Turnout		107,628	72.73%	▲15.16
Total valid votes		105,845		
Registered electors		147,977		▲24.90
INC gain from BJP		Swing	▼0.77	

=== Assembly Election 1985 ===
1985 Maharashtra Legislative Assembly election : Raver
Party	Candidate	Votes	%	±%
BJP	Dr. Gunwantrao Rambhau Sarode	27,074	40.56%	▲16.31
INC	Mirabai Dagekhan Tadavi	22,463	33.65%	New
Independent	Suman Chudaman Patil	9,946	14.90%	New
Independent	Konghe Chudaman Dalpat	4,999	7.49%	New
Independent	Sitaram Sharwan Phalak	774	1.16%	New
Independent	Gajanan Yadavrao Naik	417	0.62%	New
Independent	Gulabrao Chudamn Patil	402	0.60%	New
Margin of victory		4,611	6.91%	▼5.65
Turnout		68,206	57.57%	▲0.81
Total valid votes		66,748		
Registered electors		118,479		▲7.92
BJP gain from INC(I)		Swing	▼3.22	

=== Assembly Election 1980 ===
1980 Maharashtra Legislative Assembly election : Raver
Party	Candidate	Votes	%	±%
INC(I)	Ramkrishan Raghunath Patil	26,545	43.78%	▲25.77
INC(U)	Patil Ramkrishna Sitaram	18,932	31.23%	New
BJP	Gunvant Rambhan Sarode	14,699	24.25%	New
Margin of victory		7,613	12.56%	▼0.43
Turnout		62,311	56.76%	▼19.38
Total valid votes		60,626		
Registered electors		109,783		▲8.35
INC(I) gain from INC		Swing	▲7.59	

=== Assembly Election 1978 ===
1978 Maharashtra Legislative Assembly election : Raver
Party	Candidate	Votes	%	±%
INC	Mahukar Dhanaji Chaudhari	26,961	36.19%	▼56.83
JP	Sarode Gunwant Rambhau	17,287	23.20%	New
INC(I)	Sk. Abdul Nabi Sk. Hamid	13,419	18.01%	New
Independent	Mahajan Vasant Laxman	12,929	17.36%	New
PWPI	Patil Pandurng Eknath	3,626	4.87%	New
Margin of victory		9,674	12.99%	▼73.05
Turnout		77,140	76.14%	▲12.92
Total valid votes		74,497		
Registered electors		101,318		▲15.28
INC hold		Swing	▼56.83	

=== Assembly Election 1972 ===
1972 Maharashtra Legislative Assembly election : Raver
Party	Candidate	Votes	%	±%
INC	Mahukar Dhanaji Chaudhari	49,967	93.02%	▲19.73
ABJS	Bhika Nathu Patil	3,748	6.98%	▼6.67
Margin of victory		46,219	86.04%	▲26.40
Turnout		55,566	63.22%	▼11.66
Total valid votes		53,715		
Registered electors		87,890		▲13.32
INC hold		Swing	▲19.73	

=== Assembly Election 1967 ===
1967 Maharashtra Legislative Assembly election : Raver
Party	Candidate	Votes	%	±%
INC	Mahukar Dhanaji Chaudhari	39,335	73.29%	▲13.57
ABJS	K. G. Patil	7,325	13.65%	New
PSP	K. M. Patil	5,529	10.30%	▼27.31
SWA	G. K. Chaudhari	1,481	2.76%	New
Margin of victory		32,010	59.64%	▲37.53
Turnout		58,076	74.88%	▼3.31
Total valid votes		53,670		
Registered electors		77,559		▲17.61
INC hold		Swing	▲13.57	

=== Assembly Election 1962 ===
1962 Maharashtra Legislative Assembly election : Raver
Party	Candidate	Votes	%	±%
INC	Mahukar Dhanaji Chaudhari	28,848	59.72%	▲6.40
PSP	Gajananrao Raghunathrao Garud	18,169	37.61%	New
ABJS	Yadav Mukund Tavde	1,289	2.67%	New
Margin of victory		10,679	22.11%	▲19.43
Turnout		51,567	78.19%	▼45.77
Total valid votes		48,306		
Registered electors		65,948		▼47.18
INC hold		Swing	▲32.97	

=== Assembly Election 1957 ===
1957 Bombay State Legislative Assembly election : Raver
Party	Candidate	Votes	%	±%
INC	Wankhede Keshavrao Raghoo	41,406	26.75%	▼13.30
INC	Mahukar Dhanaji Chaudhari	41,131	26.57%	▼13.48
PWPI	Pandit Sonoo Ananda	37,255	24.07%	New
SCF	Bhalerao Trimbak Senu	34,995	22.61%	New
Margin of victory		4,151	2.68%	▼19.41
Turnout		154,787	123.96%	▲56.74
Total valid votes		154,787		
Registered electors		124,864		▲113.39
INC hold		Swing	▼13.30	

=== Assembly Election 1952 ===
1952 Bombay State Legislative Assembly election : Raver
Party	Candidate	Votes	%	±%
INC	Bonde Dhanji Maharu	15,755	40.05%	New
Kamgar Kisan Paksha	Patil Tukaram Dattu	7,066	17.96%	New
Socialist	Fegade Lodhu Ichharam	6,983	17.75%	New
Independent	Patil Vithal Rajaram	4,719	12.00%	New
Independent	Patil Vishnu Hari	3,752	9.54%	New
Independent	Bhangale Chudaman Bhikaji	1,059	2.69%	New
Margin of victory		8,689	22.09%	
Turnout		39,334	67.22%	
Total valid votes		39,334		
Registered electors		58,515		
INC win (new seat)				

== See also ==
- Raver (Lok Sabha constituency)
