= Kothali =

Kothali can mean:

- Kothali, Maharashtra, a village in the Indian state of Maharashtra
- Kothali, Karnataka, a village in the Indian state of Karnataka
