= Chandrakant Sonawane =

Indian politician

Member of Legislative Assembly of Maharashtra
- Incumbent
- Assumed office (2014-2019), (2024-Present)
- Preceded by: Jagdishchandra Walvi
- Succeeded by: Latabai Sonawane
- Constituency: Chopda

Personal details
- Party: Shiv Sena

Chandrakant Baliram Sonawane is a member of the 15th Maharashtra Legislative Assembly. He represents the Chopda Assembly Constituency. He belongs to the Shiv Sena party.

== Early life ==
Chandrakant Sonawane was born in an Agriculturist Koli family of Jalgaon district of Maharashtra in 1961.

== Political career ==
He was convicted by Dhule District Court of his involvement in Jalgaon housing scam (Marathi: घरकुल घोटाळा) of 1996. Then MLA Suresh Jain was mastermind of that scam and he got seven years imprisonment.

== Positions held ==
- 2013: Elected as Corporator in Jalgaon Municipal Corporation
- 2014: Elected to Maharashtra Legislative Assembly
- 2015: Elected as Director of Jalgaon District Central Co-operative Bank

== See also ==
- Raver Lok Sabha constituency
- Jalgaon Lok Sabha constituency
