= Chandrakant Nimba Patil =

Indian politician

Chandrakant Patil

Member of the Maharashtra Legislative Assembly
- Incumbent
- Assumed office October 2019
- Preceded by: Eknath Khadse
- Constituency: Muktainagar

Personal details
- Born: 1972 or 1973 (age 52–53)
- Party: Shiv Sena

Chandrakant Nimba Patil is a politician from Jalgaon district, Maharashtra.

== Political career ==
Patil is an independent MLA from the Muktainagar Vidhan Sabha constituency. He narrowly defeated Rohini Eknath Khadse of the BJP in the 2019 Maharashtra Legislative Assembly election. He got a ticket for 4th time as independent MLA with the support of Shiv Sena (2022-present) to contest from Muktainagar against Rohini Khadse of NCP-SP in the Vidhan Sabha elections, 2024.

== Positions held ==
- Member of Maharashtra Legislative Assembly from Muktainagar in the Maharashtra Legislative Assembly (2019–present)
