= Latabai Sonawane =

Indian politician

Latabai Chandrakant Sonawane
- लताबाई चंद्रकांत सोनवणे

Member Of Legislative Assembly of Maharashtra
- In office 2019–2024
- Preceded by: Chandrakant Baliram Sonawane
- Succeeded by: Chandrakant Baliram Sonawane
- Constituency: Chopda

Personal details
- Party: Shiv Sena
- Education: Class XII
- Profession: Politician, Farmer

Latabai Chandrakant Sonawane is an Indian politician. She was elected as Member of the Maharashtra Legislative Assembly for Chopda in October 2019. She received 78137 votes as a member of Shiv Sena Party.
