= Amol Haribhau Jawale =

Indian politician

Member of the Maharashtra Legislative Assembly
- Incumbent
- Assumed office 2024
- Preceded by: Shirish Madhukarrao Chaudhari
- Constituency: Raver

Personal details
- Political party: Bharatiya Janata Party
- Parent: Haribhau Jawale
- Profession: Politician

Amol Haribhau Jawale is an Indian politician from Maharashtra. He is a member of the Maharashtra Legislative Assembly from 2024, representing Raver Assembly constituency as a member of the Bharatiya Janata Party.

He is the son of BJP ex MP & MLA Haribhau Jawale.

== See also ==
- List of chief ministers of Maharashtra
- Maharashtra Legislative Assembly
