= Sanjay Waman Sawakare =

Indian politician

Cabinet Minister Government of Maharashtra
- Incumbent
- Assumed office 15 December 2024
- Governor: C. P. Radhakrishnan
- Cabinet: Third Fadnavis ministry
- Chief Minister: Devendra Fadnavis
- Deputy CM: Eknath Shinde; Ajit Pawar
- Guardian Minister: NA

Member of Maharashtra Legislative Assembly
- Incumbent
- Assumed office 2009
- Preceded by: Santosh Bhau Chaudhari
- Constituency: Bhusawal

Personal details
- Born: 12 October 1969 (age 56) Bhusawal, Jalgaon district
- Party: Bharatiya Janata Party (2014 onwards)
- Other political affiliations: Nationalist Congress Party
- Spouse: Rajani
- Education: Diploma in Mechanical Engineering

Sanjay Waman Sawakare is a member of the 13th Maharashtra Legislative Assembly in India. He represents the Bhusawal Assembly Constituency. He belongs to the Bharatiya Janata Party.
