= Chainsukh Madanlal Sancheti =

Indian politician

Chainsukh Sancheti
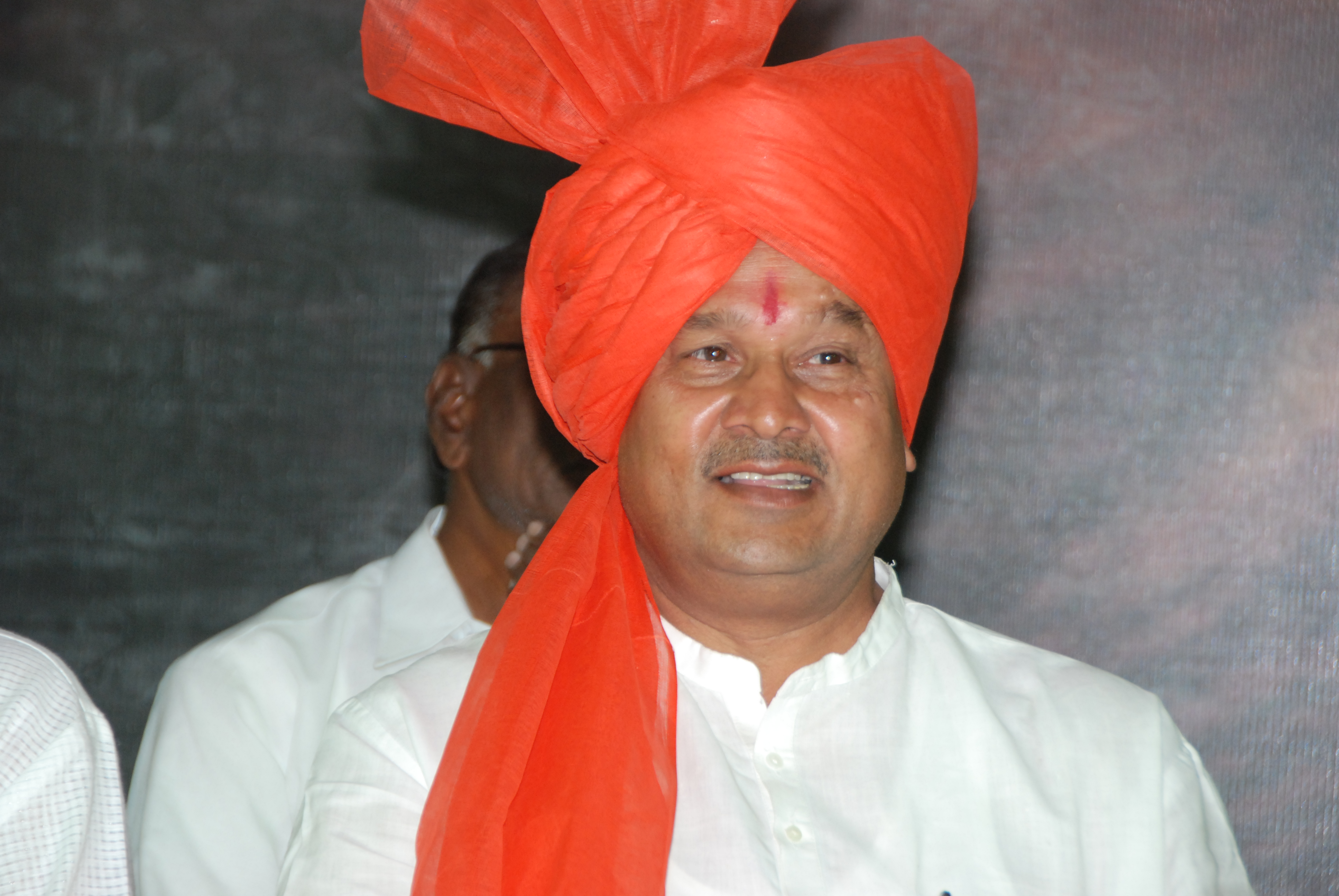

Member of the Maharashtra Legislative Assembly
- In office 1995 – 2019; 2024-current
- Constituency: Malkapur

Personal details
- Born: 16 December 1953 (age 72)
- Party: Bharatiya Janata Party
- Spouse: Ujjwala Sancheti
- Children: Raksha sancheti (Daughter); Rahul sancheti (son); Tanushree Sancheti (Daughter); Priyank Sancheti (Son)
- Parent: Madanlal Sancheti (father)
- Education: Bsc, MSc (Chemistry)
- Alma mater: Institute of Science, Nagpur
- Occupation: Politician
- Website: chainsukhsancheti.com

Chainsukh Madanlal Sancheti (born 16 December 1953) is a veteran politician of the Bhartiya Janata Party in Maharashtra, consecutively elected five times from Malkapur Assembly constituency since 1995. He was Chairman of Vidharbha Development Board.

== Early life and education ==
Chainsukh Madanlal Sancheti was born to Madanlal and Madanbai Sancheti on 16 December 1953. His father and his uncle were members of the Bharatiya Jana Sangh and Rashtriya Swayamsevak Sangh, and amongst the founding members of the Bhartiya Janata Party. His uncle, Kisanlal Sancheti, was also a Member of the Legislative Assembly from Malkapur.

Sancheti completed his primary schooling at Aadarsh Vidyalaya, Malkapur, and earned a Bachelor of Science (B.Sc) from Dhanwate College, Nagpur. Later he secured his Master of Science (M.Sc) in Organic Chemistry from the Institute of Science, Nagpur.

== Political career ==
Sancheti began his political career in the early seventies as student leader with the Akhil Bharatiya Vidyarthi Parishad (ABVP). In 1976 he was elected as President of the student council of Shri. Shivaji Education Society's Science College, Dhantoli, Nagpur. In 1978 Sancheti was appointed secretary of Janata Yuva Morcha, Maharashtra (Earlier in Janata Party before formation of BJP). In 1980 he was appointed Secretary of the Bharatiya Janata Yuva Morcha, Maharashtra State.

Sancheti kept rising through the ranks in the party and mainstream politics. In 1984 Sancheti was appointed Secretary, BJP Maharashtra. In 1989 he was appointed General Secretary, BJP, Buldhana District, Maharashtra. Sancheti has also worked as Secretary, General Secretary and Vice President, BJP Maharashtra.

Sancheti's legislative career began in 1990 when he was first elected as a municipal council corporator from Malkapur. Later he was elected as leader of opposition of the Malkapur municipal council 1990–1994. Since 1995 Sancheti has been consecutively elected as MLA from Malkapur Assembly constituency.

He lost the 2019 Assembly Election. He won the 2024 Maharashtra Legislative Assembly election from the Malkapur Assembly constituency.
