= Muktainagar Assembly constituency =

Constituency of the Maharashtra legislative assembly in India

Coordinates: 21.0452528°N 76.0434578°E

Muktainagar
- Constituency No. 20 for the Maharashtra Legislative Assembly

Constituency details
- Country: India
- Region: Western India
- State: Maharashtra
- District: Jalgaon
- Lok Sabha constituency: Raver
- Established: 1952
- Total electors: 304,220
- Reservation: None

Member of Legislative Assembly
- 15th Maharashtra Legislative Assembly
- Incumbent Chandrakant Nimba Patil
- Party: SHS
- Alliance: NDA
- Elected year: 2024

Muktainagar Assembly constituency is one of the 288 Vidhan Sabha (Assembly) constituencies of the Maharashtra state in Western India. It is one of the eleven Vidhan Sabha constituencies of Jalgaon district.

Chandrakant Nimba Patil is the current MLA from the constituency.

https://muktainagar.in/

== Overview ==
It is part of Raver Lok Sabha constituency, along with five other assembly constituencies, namely, Chopda, Raver, Bhusaval, Jamner Assembly constituency, and Malkapur.

== Members of the legislative assembly ==
| Year | Member | Party |
|---|---|---|
| 1962 | Hiralal Indal Kalyani | Indian National Congress |
| 1967 | Pratibha Patil | Indian National Congress |
| 1972 | Pratibha Patil | Indian National Congress |
| 1978 | Pratibha Patil | Indian National Congress |
| 1980 | Pratibha Patil | Indian National Congress (I) |
| 1985 | Haribhau Jaware | Indian Congress (Socialist) |
| 1990 | Eknath Khadse | Bharatiya Janata Party |
| 1995 | Eknath Khadse | Bharatiya Janata Party |
| 1999 | Eknath Khadse | Bharatiya Janata Party |
| 2004 | Eknath Khadse | Bharatiya Janata Party |
| 2009 | Eknath Khadse | Bharatiya Janata Party |
| 2014 | Eknath Khadse | Bharatiya Janata Party |
| 2019 | Chandrakant Nimba Patil | Independent |
| 2024 | Chandrakant Nimba Patil | Shiv Sena |

== Election results ==
=== Assembly Election 2024 https://muktainagar.in/ ===
2024 Maharashtra Legislative Assembly election : Muktainagar
| Party | Candidate | Votes | % | ±% |
|---|---|---|---|---|
| SS | Chandrakant Nimba Patil | 112,318 | 52.02 | New |
| NCP-SP | Rohini Khadse-Khewalkar | 88,414 | 40.95 | New |
| VBA | Sanjay Pandit Bramhane | 5,471 | 2.53 | ▼2.48 |
| Independent | Vinod Namdeo Sonawane | 2,332 | 1.08 | New |
| Independent | Umakant Atmaram Marathe | 1,643 | 0.76 | New |
| NOTA | None of the Above | 656 | 0.30 | ▼0.63 |
| Margin of victory | | 23,904 | 11.07 | ▲10.06 |
| Turnout | | 216,578 | 71.19 | ▲3.98 |
| Total valid votes | | 215,922 | | |
| Registered electors | | 304,220 | | ▲4.84 |
| SS gain from Independent | | Swing | ▲5.16 | |

=== Assembly Election 2019 https://muktainagar.in/ ===
2019 Maharashtra Legislative Assembly election : Muktainagar
| Party | Candidate | Votes | % | ±% |
|---|---|---|---|---|
| Independent | Chandrakant Nimba Patil | 91,092 | 46.85 | New |
| BJP | Rohini Khadse-Khewalkar | 89,135 | 45.85 | ▼1.41 |
| VBA | Rahul Ashok Patil | 9,751 | 5.02 | New |
| NOTA | None of the Above | 1,806 | 0.93 | ▼0.32 |
| BSP | Bhagawan Damu Ingale | 1,585 | 0.82 | ▼0.78 |
| BMP | Sanju Kadu Ingale | 1,403 | 0.72 | New |
| Margin of victory | | 1,957 | 1.01 | ▼4.35 |
| Turnout | | 196,301 | 67.65 | ▼0.90 |
| Total valid votes | | 194,414 | | |
| Registered electors | | 290,175 | | ▲8.69 |
| Independent gain from BJP | | Swing | ▼0.40 | |

=== Assembly Election 2014 https://muktainagar.in/ ===
2014 Maharashtra Legislative Assembly election : Muktainagar
| Party | Candidate | Votes | % | ±% |
|---|---|---|---|---|
| BJP | Eknath Ganpatrao Khadse | 85,657 | 47.26 | ▼3.66 |
| SS | Chandrakant Nimba Patil | 75,949 | 41.90 | New |
| NCP | Arun Pandurang Patil | 6,499 | 3.59 | ▼36.41 |
| INC | Patil Yogendrasing Bhagwan | 4,495 | 2.48 | New |
| BSP | Thakare Suresh Shivram | 2,895 | 1.60 | ▲0.55 |
| NOTA | None of the Above | 2,264 | 1.25 | New |
| Margin of victory | | 9,708 | 5.36 | ▼5.57 |
| Turnout | | 183,745 | 68.83 | ▼4.10 |
| Total valid votes | | 181,263 | | |
| Registered electors | | 266,973 | | ▲14.19 |
| BJP hold | | Swing | ▼3.66 | |

=== Assembly Election 2009 https://muktainagar.in/ ===
2009 Maharashtra Legislative Assembly election : Muktainagar
| Party | Candidate | Votes | % | ±% |
|---|---|---|---|---|
| BJP | Eknath Ganpatrao Khadse | 85,708 | 50.92 | New |
| NCP | Adv. Ravindra Pralhadrav Patil | 67,319 | 39.99 | New |
| MNS | Dr. Jagdish Tukaram Patil | 5,786 | 3.44 | New |
| Independent | Shailesh Sardarsing Patil | 3,008 | 1.79 | New |
| Independent | Patil Vishal Bhagwan | 1,825 | 1.08 | New |
| BSP | Nikam Santosh Supadu | 1,767 | 1.05 | New |
| Margin of victory | | 18,389 | 10.92 | |
| Turnout | | 168,501 | 72.07 | |
| Total valid votes | | 168,331 | | |
| Registered electors | | 233,797 | | |
| BJP win (new seat) | | | | |

== See also ==
- Muktainagar
