= Raksha Khadse =

Indian politician

Raksha Nikhil Khadse
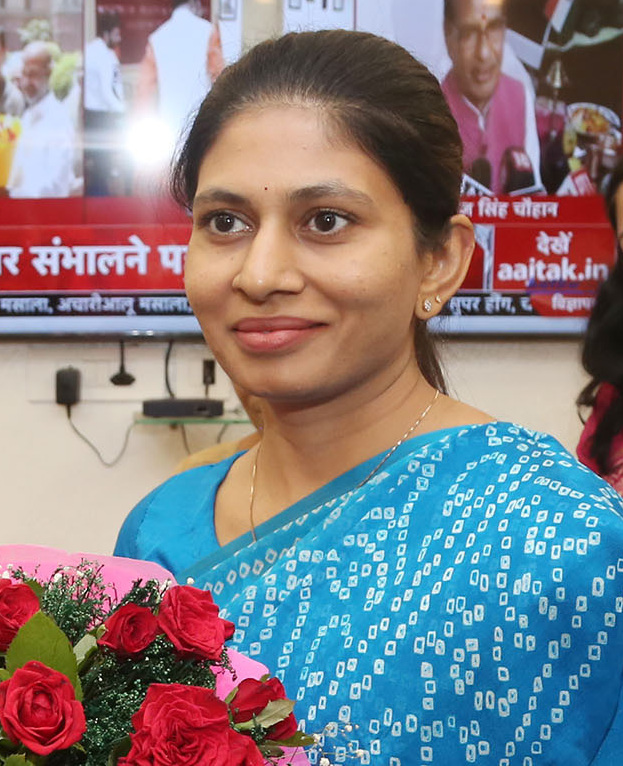
- Khadse in 2024

Union Minister of State for Youth Affairs and Sports
- Incumbent
- Assumed office 11 June 2024
- Prime Minister: Narendra Modi
- Minister: Mansukh Mandaviya
- Preceded by: Nisith Pramanik

Member of Parliament, Lok Sabha
- Incumbent
- Assumed office 16 May 2014
- Preceded by: Haribhau Jawale
- Constituency: Raver

Personal details
- Born: Priyanka Jagdish Patel; 13 May 1987 (age 39) Khetia, Madhya Pradesh
- Party: Bharatiya Janata Party
- Spouse: Nikhil Khadse (died 2013)
- Relations: Eknath Khadse (father-in-law)
- Children: 2
- Profession: Politician

Raksha Nikhil Khadse (born 13 May 1987) is a politician from Maharashtra and a member of the Bhartiya Janata Party. She represents the Raver Loksabha seat in the lower house of the Indian parliament and is a Minister of State in the Government of India.

== Personal life ==
Khadse was born in Khetia, Madhya Pradesh. Raksha Khadse is the daughter-in-law of senior NCP leader of Maharashtra Eknath Khadse. She is the wife of late Nikhil Khadse. She comes from the Leva Patel (Leva Patidar) agrarian community.

== Political career ==
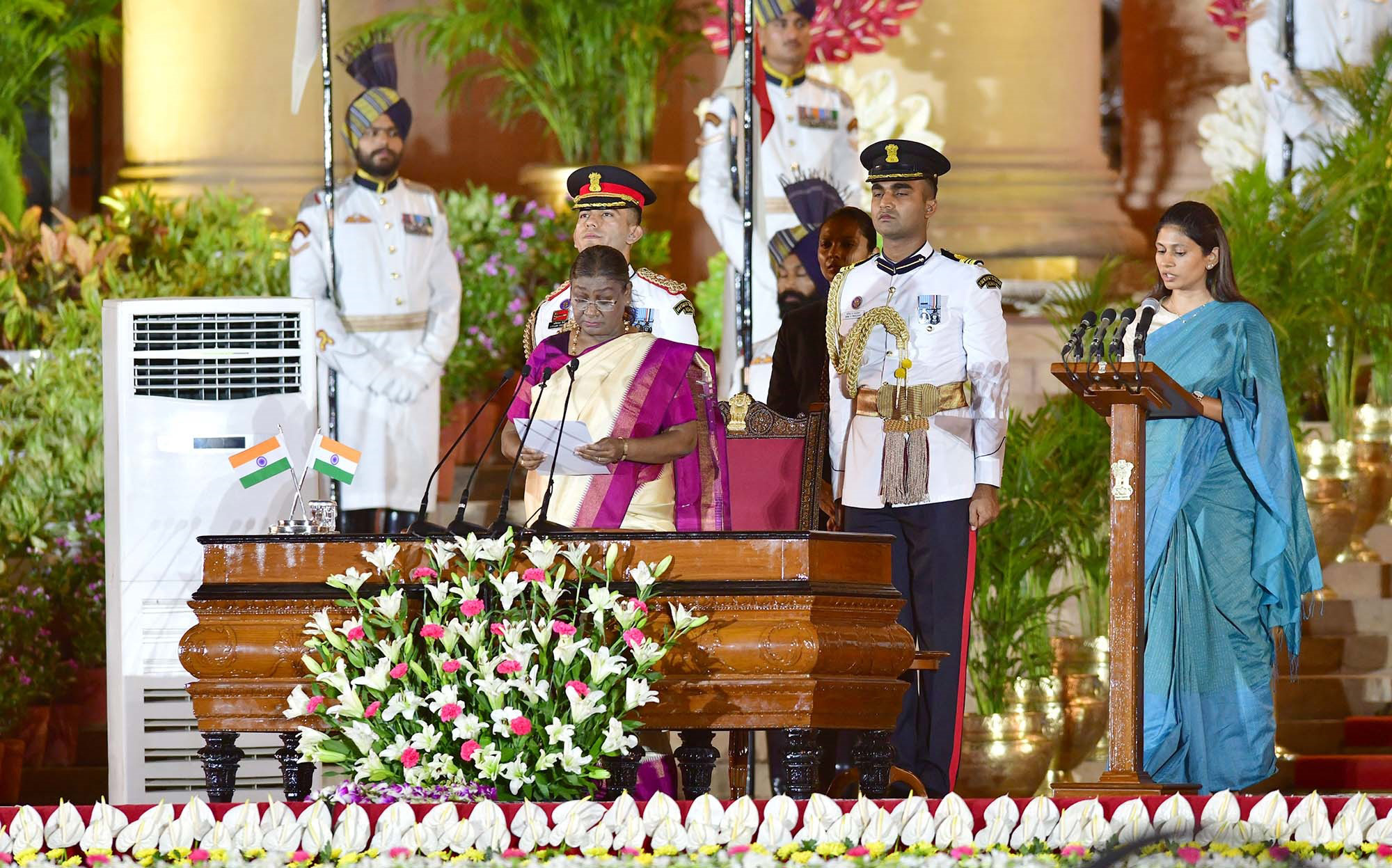
President Droupadi Murmu administering the oath as Cabinet Minister to Raksha

Khadse was elected as Sarpanch of Kothali village. Later she was elected to the Jalgaon Zila Parishad. In the 2014 Lok Sabha elections, she defeated Manish Jain of the Nationalist Congress Party by a margin of 318608 votes. She obtaining 605452 while Jain received 287384 votes. At the age of 26, she, along with Heena Gavit, became the youngest MP in the 16th Lok Sabha.

She was re-elected in 2019 for a second term as MP of Raver Loksabha. She has been named for a third time by the Bharatiya Janata Party as a candidate for the upcoming 2024 Indian general election.

== Electoral performance ==
Election Candidature History
Election	Year	Party	Constituency	Opponent		Result	Margin
Loksabha	2014	BJP	Raver	NCP	Manish Jain	Won	318,068
Loksabha	2019	BJP	Raver	INC	Dr. Ulhas Patil	Won	3,35,882
Loksabha	2024	BJP	Raver	NCP-SP	Shriram Patil	Won	2,72,183

== Positions held ==
- 2010 to 2012 - Sarpanch of Kothali Grampanchayat.
- 2012 to 2014 - Member Zillah Parishad, Jalgaon, Maharashtra.
- 2012 to 2014 - Chairperson (Sabhapati) Health, Education & Sports Committee, Zillah Parishad, Jalgaon, Maharashtra.
- 2014 to present - Member of Parliament for Raver Loksabha constituency, Maharashtra.
- 2024 to present - Union Minister of State for Youth Affairs and Sports, Government of India

== See also ==
- Third Modi ministry
