= North Maharashtra =

Geographical region of Maharashtra, India

North Maharashtra Uttar Maharashtra
- Geographical region
- Location within Maharashtra
- Country: India
- State: Maharashtra
- Districts: 1) Nashik; 2) Dhule; 3) Nandurbar; 4) Jalgaon
- Languages: Marathi
- Division: Nashik Division

Government
  - Body: Government of Maharashtra

Area
  - Land: 40,497 km^{2} (15,636 sq mi)
- Time zone: UTC+5:30 (IST)

North Maharashtra (Marathi: Uttar Maharashtra) is a geographical region of Maharashtra State, India. The region is composed of Nashik, Dhule, Nandurbar, and Jalgaon districts. It borders the state of Gujarat to the northwest, Paschim Maharashtra to the south, Konkan to the west, and the Vidarbha and Marathwada regions of Maharashtra to the east.

== History ==
The Chalukya dynasty ruled the southern part of region during ancient times. The fort at Parola is believed to have once belonged to the father of the Queen of Jhansi. On 13 March 1795, the Maratha Empire defeated Nizam of Ahmadnagar and Dhule District became part of the empire.

In 1906, the British government split Khandesh district into East Khandesh and West Khandesh. In 1960 these were renamed to Dhule district and Jalgaon district respectively.

In the 1900s, inspired by Italian revolutionary Giuseppe Mazzini and his secret society Young Italy, Vinayak Savarkar founded a secret society, Abhinav Bharat, in Nasik.

On 21 December 1909, Anant Kanhere, a student from Aurangabad, assassinated Nashik governor A. M. T. Jackson at a theatre. Kanhere was immediately arrested and after an investigation police arrested Vinayak Savarkar and other accomplices for conspiring against the government to instigate an armed rebellion. The case became known as the Nasik Conspiracy. Jackson's assassination created a sensation in Poona, Nasik and Bombay, with the case and subsequent imprisonment making Savarkar famous. At the trial in Bombay, police accused Savarkar of being one of the ringleaders behind the conspiracy. The Bombay court sentenced him to life imprisonment and transportation to the Cellular Jail on the Andaman and Nicobar Islands. At that time the punishment was known as Kālā Pānī (transl. Black water); Savarkar's elder brother Babarao Savarkar also received the same sentence and others received various degrees of imprisonment.

In 1936, the Indian National Congress conducted its first ever assembly in Faizpur, East Khandesh district on the advice of Mahatma Gandhi. Gandhi, Jawaharlal Nehru, and Rajendra Prasad were among the dignitaries who were present.

In 1942, Mahatma Gandhi announced the Quit India Movement in Bombay, after British police fired bullets at marching schoolchildren in Nandurbar. Shirish Kumar, a 15-year-old boy, and other participating children died due to gunshot wounds.

The region was part of the Bombay Presidency. In 1956, it became part of Bombay State, before being included in Maharashtra in 1960.

== Geography ==
=== Climate ===
In the summer, the temperature in the region climbs to over 44 °C (111 °F). Like the rest of India, North Maharashtra is affected by the South Asian Monsoon.

=== Rivers ===
This region contains the Godavari River in Nashik, the Tapti river in jalgaon district and Panjhara rivers in Dhule, and the Narmada River in Nandurbar.

=== Dams ===
Hatnur Dam is located at the on Tapti River. North Maharashtra also has Garbaldi Dam near Pal hill station, and Waghur Dam near Jamner Shelgaon Dam near Bhusawal. Nashik district has Gangapur and Nandur-Madheshwar dams on the Godavari River.

=== Crops ===
Various crops are grown in North Maharashtra, including jowar, cotton, lentils, chickpeas, wheat, onions, sugarcane, grapes, groundnuts, and maize.

=== Wildlife ===
Yawal Wildlife Sanctuary is situated in Yawal in the northern part of the region. Mukatainagar's forest has many tigers. The region has lots of neem, banyan, babool, guava, Pipad, and tamarind trees as well wild animal species such as warthogs, monkeys, snakes, fish, reptiles, and rats. Birds such as crows, sparrows, green parrots, hummingbirds, and egretss are also present. The number of has significantly reduced due to deforestation.

=== Political geography ===
North Maharashtra has the following Lok Sabha constituencies:

- Raver
- Jalgaon
- Nashik
- Nandurbar
- Erandol

The region also has the following Maharashtra Legislative Assembly constituencies:

- Muktainagar
- Bhusawal
- Jamner
- Chopda
- Chalisgaon
- Erandol
- Pachora

== Economy ==
The economy of the region relies on agriculture and common crops include cotton, sugarcane, lentils, maze, bananas, peas, and wheat. Jalgaon District is informally referred to as the "Banana Capital of India". The district is the largest producer of bananas in Maharashtra and grows the world's seventh largest banana crop.

Nashik district is also a leader in grape production; only Niphad and Dindori talukas are ahead of Nashik in grape production in North Maharashtra.

== Entertainment ==
The region has its own entertainment industry, with many local singers and actors working in it. The Ahirani song industry has been experiencing robust growth since 2010. Music composers from Shendurni and Nashik district have made popular Ahirani-Marathi songs in recent years such as Jhumka wali por (transl. A girl wearing earrings) (2023), Bablya ikas kesavar fuge (transl. Bablya sells balloons for hairs).

== Educational facilities ==
North Maharashtra University serves Dhule, Nandurbar, and Jalgaon districts, and is located in Jalgaon. Yashwantrao Chavan Maharashtra Open University's campus is situated in Nashik, and serves the entirety Maharashtra.

== Culture ==
Marathi poet Bahinabai Chaudhari was born in Bhadli village near Bhusawal in Jalgaon district. Poets Balkavi Thombre and Vishnu Vaman Shirwadkar, writers of several acclaimed poetry works, were both from the region. Thombre was born in Jalgaon District and was considered a child prodigy. Shirwadkar awww also a prominent novelist; his play Natsamrat is considered as an epic work of literature in Maharashtra.

== Tourism ==
There are many Hindu pilgrimage centres in North Maharashtra such as Changdeva Temple, Muktabai mandir in Muktainagar, and Shirsada Hanuman Temple. There are also Saptashrungi Devi, Kalaram, and Trayambakeshawar jyotirlinga mandirs in Nashik district, as well as Padmalay Ganpati mandir near Erandol.

Unapdev and Sunapdev's hot springs are a popular tourist attraction in Jalgaon.

== Connectivity ==
The region has two small domestic airports: Nashik Airport and Jalgaon Airport. National Highway 53 does through Muktainagar, Bhusawal, Jalgaon, Dhule, Nandurbar talukas. Bhusaval Junction railway station, which has the most number of platforms in the nation, is located in Bhusawal. The region is well-connected to the various cities of the region and nation by railway lines.

== Notable people ==
- Mrunal Thakur – film actress, born in Dhule, attended secondary school in Jalgaon
- Pallavi Patil – Marathi film actress, born in Dhule
- Madhav Mantri – cricketer from Nashik, maternal uncle of Sunil Gavaskar
- Ujjwal Nikam – public attorney, a citizen of Jalgaon
- Vinayak Savarkar – writer and Hindu nationalist
- Anant Kanhere – Indian independence fighter
