= Changdeva Temple =

Temple in Muktainagar, India

Changdeva temple
- Changdeva Mandir
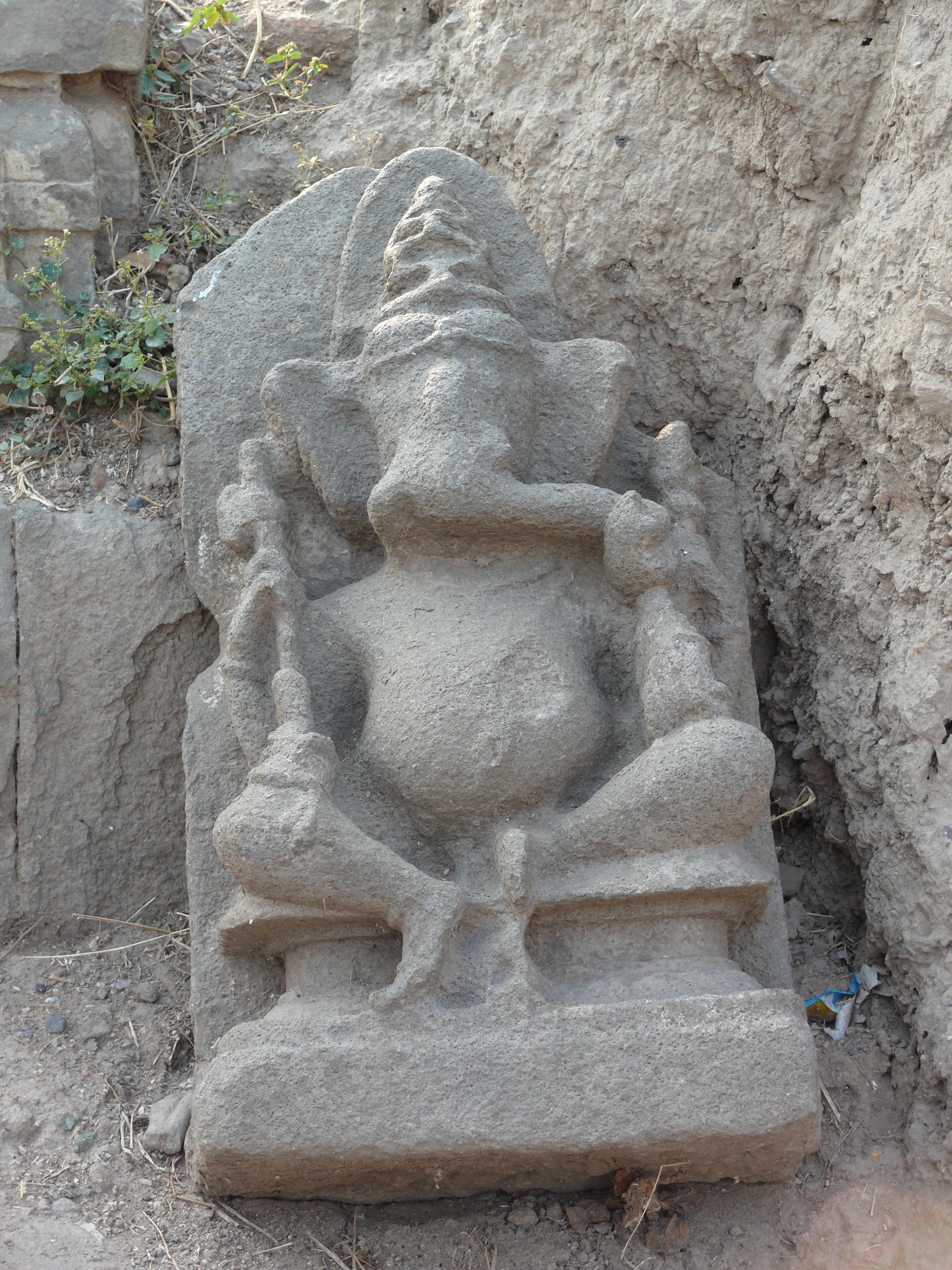
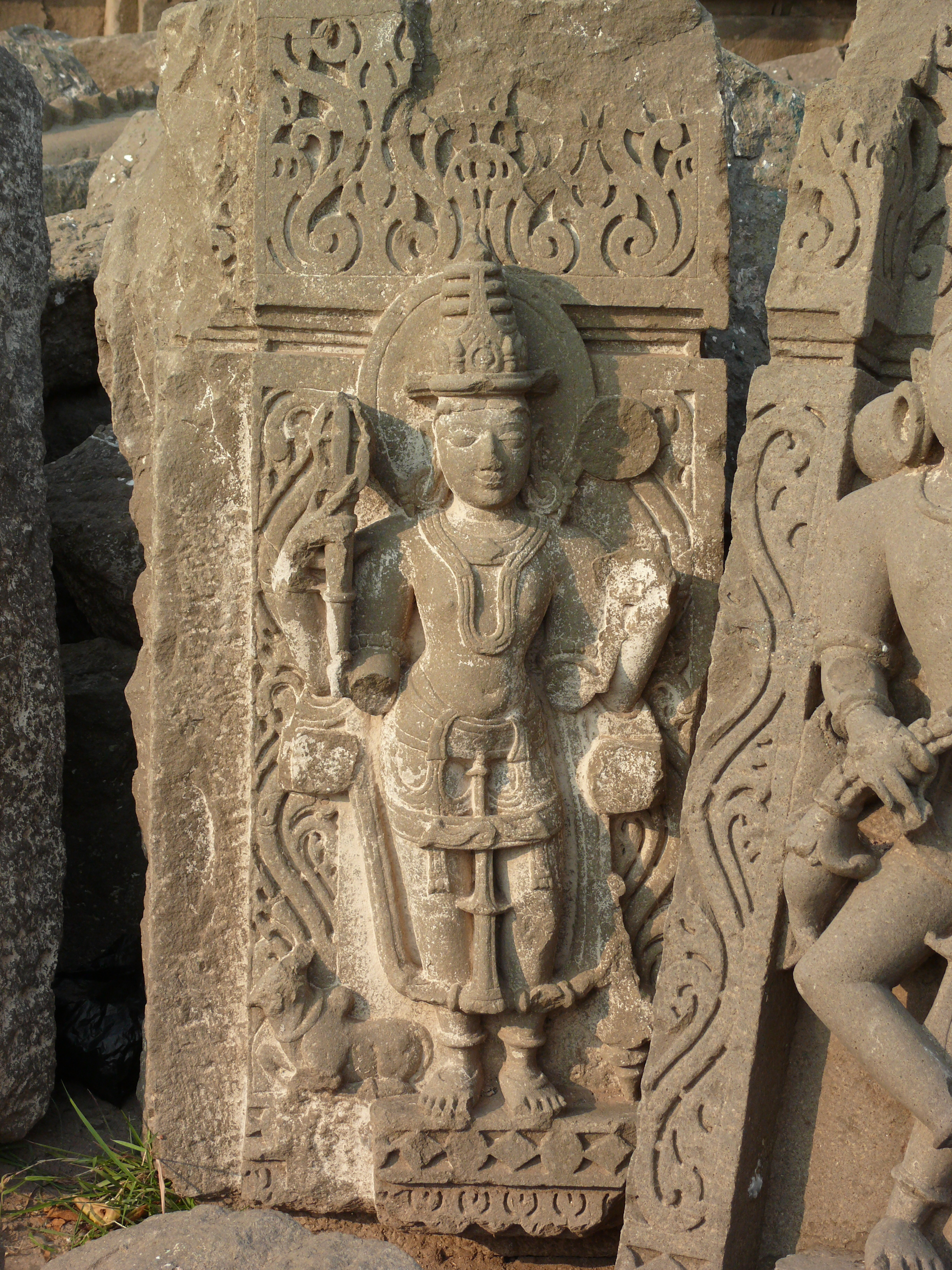
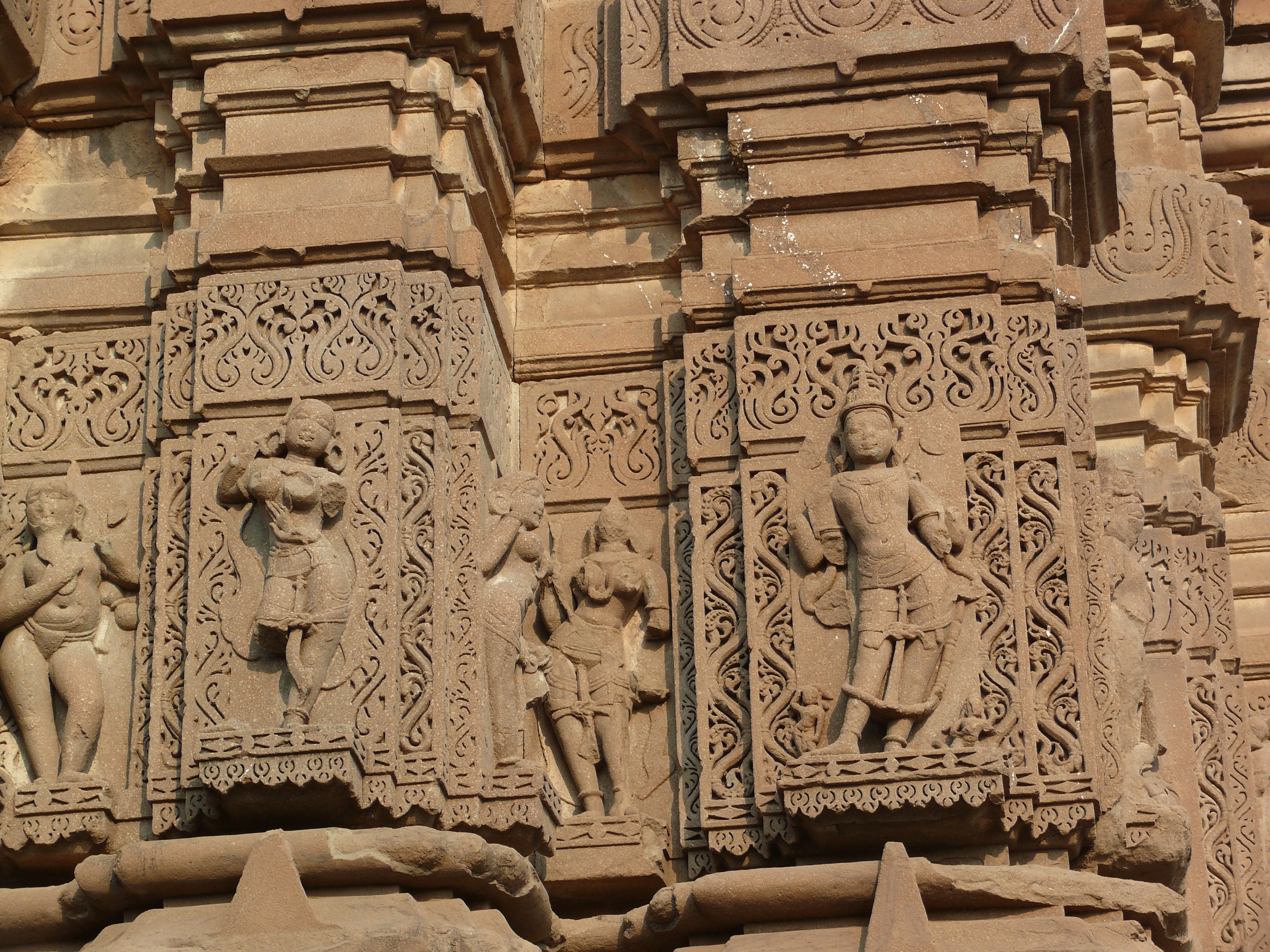
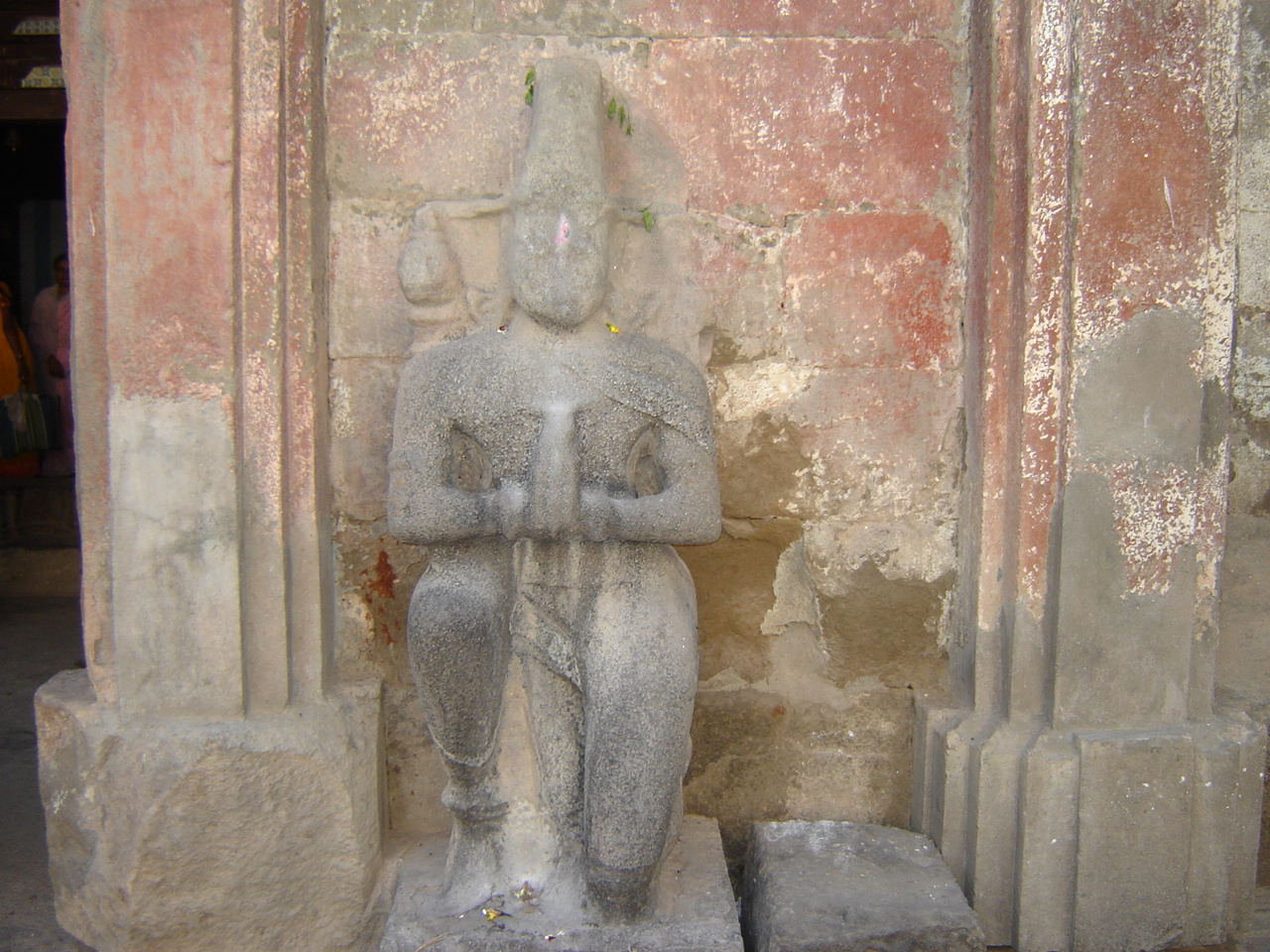
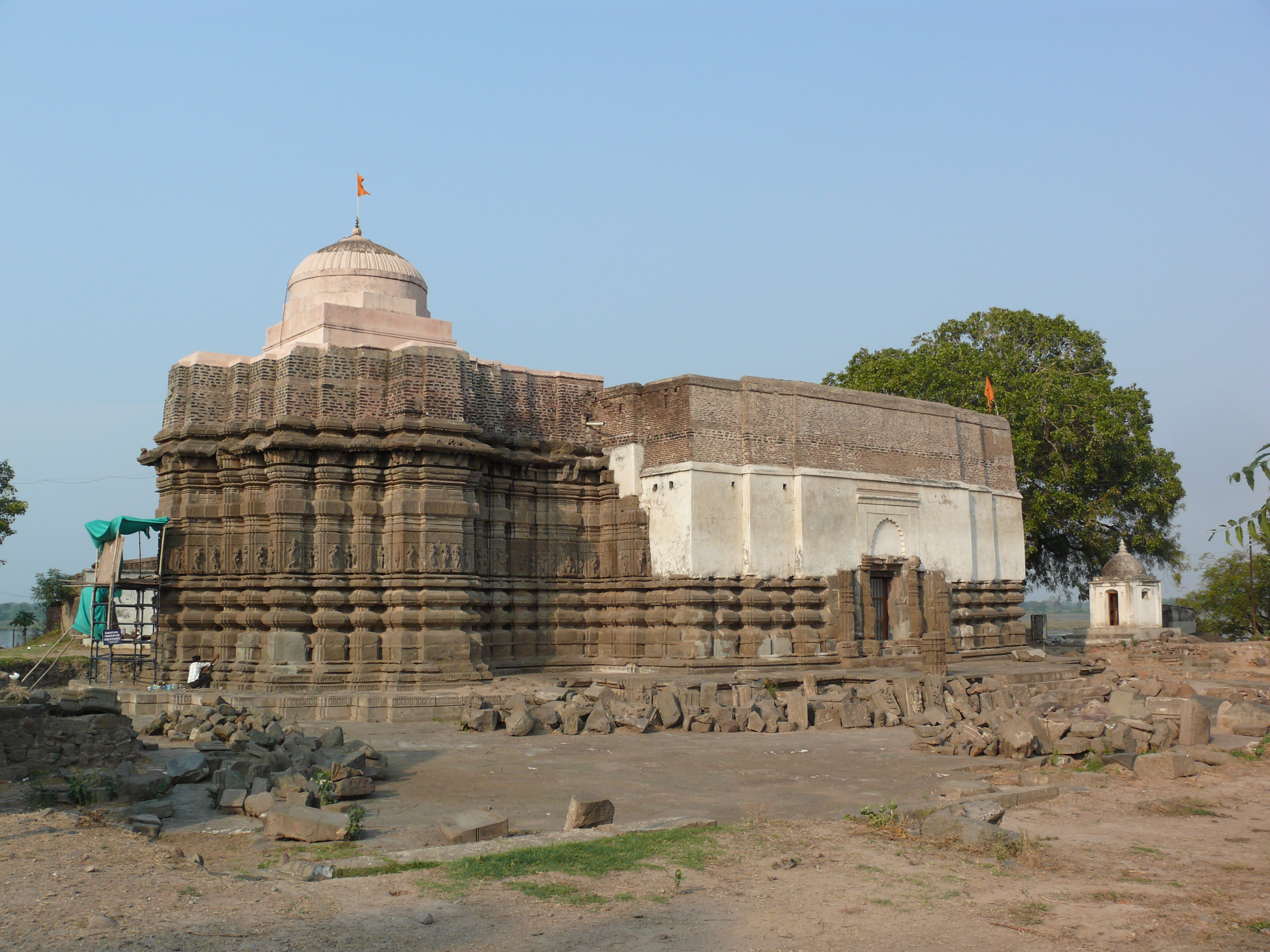
- Clockwise - Idols found in Archeological Survey of India's excavation : Ganpati idol, Lord Vishnu's idol, stone sculpture of Hanuman, wide view of Changdeva temple from South side of the temple, external wall sculptures of Apsaras on Changdeva temple. Changdeva temple near Muktainagar, India

Religion
- Affiliation: Hinduism
- District: Jalgaon
- Deity: Changdeva Maharaj
- Festival: Mahashivratri
- Status: Active

Location
- Location: Changdeva, Muktainagar taluka, Jalgaon district, Maharashtra, India.
- State: Maharashtra
- Country: India
- Interactive map of Changdeva temple
- Coordinates: 21°05′31″N 76°00′22″E

Architecture
- Architect: Unknown
- Style: Hemadpanthi
- Founder: Unknown
- Creator: Unknown
- Established: Unknown

Specifications
- Length: 31 m (102 ft)
- Width: 11 m (36 ft)
- Height (max): 31 feet (Approximately)
- Temple: 3
- Inscriptions: No inscription found so far
- Materials: Black rock, chalk, and in repair somewhere in couple of decades back, flat bricks used
- Elevation: 219 m (719 ft)

Changdeva temple (also referred as Changdev Maharaj Temple) is an ancient Hindu temple situated in Muktainagar taluka of Jalgaon district in the state of Maharashtra, India. It is located near its namesake, Changdeva village. The temple is on the shore of the Purna river. It is dedicated to the 12th century Yogi Saint Changdeva Maharaj.

== History ==
Legend - According to a legend associated with this temple. This temple was built in between the time, When six months long night experienced.

In the year of 2008, Archeological Survey of India (ASI) carried out excavations near the West and South sides of the temple. Where they discovered foundations of stone temples. ASI also found Ganpati idols made of black rock. Throughout the following years, they carried out ad-hoc excavations near this temple and revealed the veranda, foundations of ancient temples, steps, the Garbahgriha, and a large Shiva linga. According to the Maharashtra Times's article of December 2013, the temple's original kadas collapsed in the flood of 1837.

== Architecture ==
Changdeva temple is situated near Purna river. The temple is built in black rock in the Hemadpanthi architecture style. The people who built this temple used only dove-tailed black rocks and chalk in construction. The walls of the temple are adorned with stone-carved sculptures of women in various graceful poses. They appear wearing Indian attire like Apsaras, probably these women statues on the external walls are of Apsaras. The temple has a stone idol of Changdeva Maharaj in its Garbhagruh. Idols discovered during excavations by the ASI are displayed in the open air near the temple. The temple has its main gate on the North side, with a large mandap in front without a roof. The temple is 10 meters long by 9 meters wide. Mahadeva and Shani Dev temples are located just a few feet away from this temple. This temple is under the custody of the Archaeological department of Aurangabad. It is a protected monument.

== Annual fair ==
Every year in the month of February, on the auspicious occasion of Mahashivaratri, a big fair is held here. People from all around North Maharashtra visit the temple to receive the blessings of Changdeva Maharaj. Hundreds of thousands of devotees visit this temple during this annual fair. This fair is one of the well-known fairs of North Maharashtra. Over the years, it has developed as a tourist destination. The temple is located at the confluence of the Tapi and Purna rivers. The Tapi river arrives from Madhya Pradesh, and the Purna flows from Muktainagar taluka. During the fair, devotees enjoy boat rides in this river. Because of the Hatnur dam the river here and at Muktainagar taluka has full water throughout the year. The panoramic view of the Purna river here is a popular sight for tourists. People of the varkari samparaday annually comes here on Mahashivaratri.
