= Changdev, Jalgaon =

Village in Maharashtra, India

Changdev
- village
- Location in Maharashtra, India Changdev (India)
- Coordinates: 21.075370°N 76.000071°E
- Country: India
- State: Maharashtra
- District: Jalgaon

Government
  - Type: Gram panchayat

Population
  - Total: 4,000

Languages
  - Official: Marathi
- Time zone: UTC+5:30 (IST)
- Sex ratio: 926 ♂/♀
- Literacy: 100%

Changdev is situated in Muktainagar taluka in Jalgaon district of Maharashtra, India. The town got its name from yogi Changdev Maharaj, a saint who is believed to have stayed here for 1400 years. The town is situated about of 5 km from National Highway 6 and Hartala intersection.

== History ==
History of the town is mostly associated with the history of Changdev Maharaj. The present day Changdev town used to be known as Shri Kshetra Bhingnapur and even before that as Sundarpur. As the legend goes, Changdev Maharaj, a powerful yogi had defied death 14 times using his yogic powers. Over period of time Changdev had developed pride due to his extra ordinary achievements which was obstructing his advancement. It was his spiritual guide Muktai, who pulled him out of this trap and showed him the path to realization. There exists an ancient temple here in which Changdev Maharaj had taken his Samādhi.

== Changdev Maharaj temple ==
The major worship place of the town is the ancient Changdev Maharaj temple. The temple is situated at the junction of Tapi and Purna rivers and has been declared as a protected monument by the Archaeological Survey of India.

== See also ==
- Changdev Maharaj
- Harishchandragad
