= Hartala =

Village in Jalgaon district of Maharashtra, India

Hartada
- Village
- Hartale
- Location of Haratada in Maharashtra Hartada (India)
- Coordinates: 21°00′40″N 76°01′17″E
- Country: India
- State: Maharashtra
- District: Jalgaon district
- Taluka: Muktainagar

Area
  - Total: 3,575.80 ha (8,836.0 acres)
- Elevation: 274 m (899 ft)

Population (2011)
  - Total: 4,664
- Time zone: UTC+5:30 (IST)
- PIN Code: 425306
- Vehicle registration: MH-19

Hartala (or Haratale) is a village in Muktainagar taluka of Jalgaon district in Maharashtra, India. It is located near National Highway 53.

== Geography ==
This village is situated near the taluka seat of Muktainagar. It is situated on 274 meters above sea level on a hill. A 175 hectare freshwater lake is present to the southeast of the village. Nearby villages include Ghodasgaon, Muktainagar, Ruikheda, Pimpri Akraut, Taroda and Uchanda. Ruikheda is 15 km (9.3 mi) from Hartala, while Muktainagar is 7.3 km (4.5 mi), and Ghodasgaon is 16 km (9.9 mi) away.

== Demographics ==
According to the 2011 Census, the population of the village is 1097 families. It has 2422 males and 2442 females. The population below the age of six is 540, among whom 256 are girls and 284 are boys. Hartada has 1547 literate persons, out of whom 932 are female and 615 are male. It has 40 cultivators. The majority of the population speaks Marathi language.

== Administration ==
Hartala is part of the Muktainagar Vidhan Sabha constituency and Raver Lok Sabha constituency. It is in the Nashik division of Maharashtra and is part of the Bhusaval subdivision.

== Education ==
Hartala has a government Marathi-language primary school for grades 1 through 4.
