= Dolarkheda =

- Village
- Dolarkhede
- Location within Maharashtra Location within India
- Coordinates: 21°03′52″N 76°08′47″E
- Country: India
- State: Maharashtra
- District: Jalgaon
- Taluka: Muktainagar

Government
  - Body: Gram panchayat

Area
  - Total: 161.9 ha (400 acres)

Population (2011)
  - Total: 904
- Time zone: UTC+5:30 (IST)
- PIN Code: 425306
- Vehicle registration: MH - 19

Dolarkheda (or Dolarkhede) is a village in the Muktainagar taluka of Jalgaon district in Maharashtra, India. It is situated in the foothills of the Satpura Mountains and is located in a reserved forest.

== Geography ==
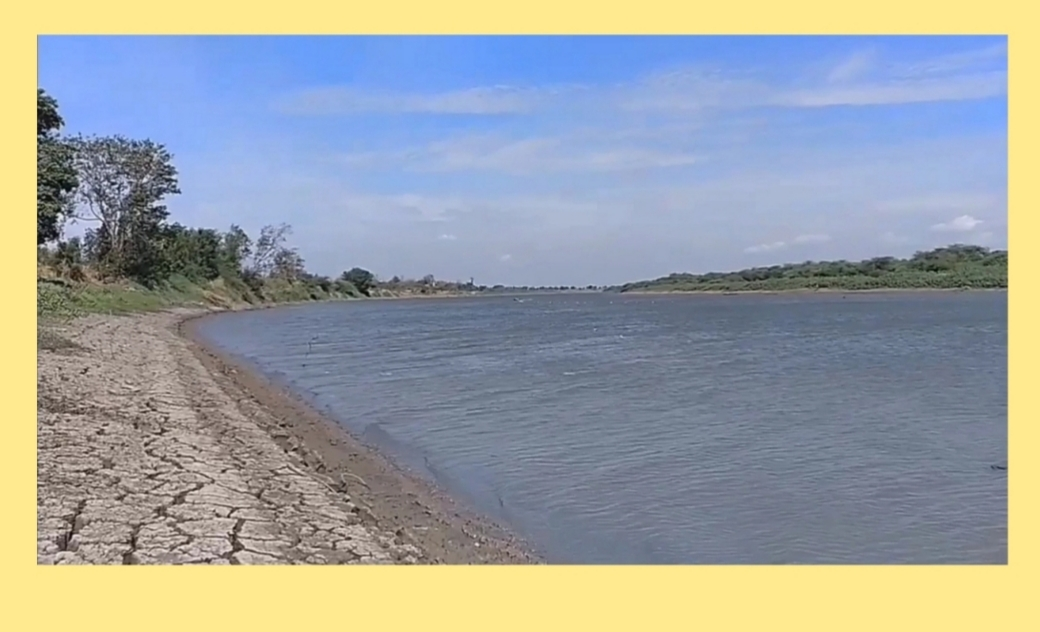
Purna river near Dolarkheda

This village is located near the foothills of the Satpura mountains on the banks of the Purna River. It is situated near the Muktainagar-Kurha road. Dolarkheda is 5 kilometres from Ghodasgaon. Muktainagar is 15 kilometres away from Dolarkheda. Sukai and Dui are nearby villages.

The tiger population is reported to consist of four adults and three cubs.

== Demographics ==
The population of the village primarily speaks Marathi. Dolarkheda has 215 families. According to the 2011 Census, the population of the village is 904 people. It has 437 females and 467 males. 154 kids are below six years of age out of which 83 are boys and 71 are girls. 491 persons are literate, consisting of 273 females and 218 males. Dolarkheda has 80 cultivators, out of whom 40 are male and 41 are female. 382 people are agriculture labourers. 193 males and 189 females has occupation of agricultural worker.

== Administration ==
This village ois part of the Sukli gram panchayat. It is in the Muktainagar Vidhan Sabha constituency and Raver Lok Sabha constituency.

== Education ==
This village has a Marathi-medium primary school.
