= Ghodasgaon =

Ghodasgaon may refer to

- Ghodasgaon, Dhule District, Maharashtra, India
- Ghodasgaon, Jalgaon District, Maharashtra, India
