= Muktainagar Municipal Council =

Municipal council in Maharashtra, India

Type
- Type: Municipal Council of the Muktainagar

Leadership
- Mayor: Najama Tadvi, Bharatiya Janata Party
- Seats: 17

Elections
- Last election: 20-July-2018

Muktainagar is the Municipal council in district of Jalgaon, Maharashtra.

== History ==
Muktainagar is a Municipal Council city and tehsil in district of Jalgaon, Maharashtra. Muktainagar is a large town with total 5352 families residing. Muktainagar has population of 23970 of which 12433 are males while 11537 are females as per Population Census 2011.

In 2020, during the COVID period, Measurement No. 745 was carried out for Plot No. 74 in Rehabilitation Phase 2, Muktainagar. The measurement was conducted by the then land surveyor, Ankat Patil, and was processed under the authority of the DYSLR serving at that time. The measurement contained serious errors, including an incorrect Gut number, an incorrect address of the adjoining landholder, defects in the notice process, and an incorrect determination of the plot boundary.

Crucially, the present Deputy Superintendent of Land Records (DYSLR), Muktainagar, Vandan Jadhav, has subsequently acknowledged the mistakes in this earlier measurement and acknowledged that the measurement carried out at that time was incorrect. His acknowledgment concerns the mistakes committed during the 2020 measurement process by land surveyor Ankat Patil and the then DYSLR; Vandan Jadhav was not the DYSLR responsible for carrying out or approving that measurement in 2020.

This acknowledgment by the present DYSLR is extremely significant because the irregularities in Measurement No. 745 are therefore not limited merely to objections raised by the affected Plot No. 73 landholder. The errors in the earlier measurement have subsequently been recognized at the level of the Land Records Department itself.

The incorrect measurement benefited Plot No. 74 by extending its boundary into the adjoining Plot No. 73. Plot No. 73 originally measured approximately 2,000 sq. ft.; following the incorrect boundary determination and the subsequent occupation of the affected portion, only approximately 500–600 sq. ft. remains in the original owner's actual possession.

This raises a serious question: how was a measurement containing a wrong Gut number, wrong adjoining-landholder address, defective notice process and incorrect boundary determination accepted and allowed to alter the physical boundaries of the plots? More importantly, even after the present DYSLR acknowledged the mistakes in the 2020 measurement, the consequences of that incorrect measurement have not yet been fully corrected on the ground.

Strong highlighted statement

“Present DYSLR Vandan Jadhav has acknowledged that mistakes were committed in the 2020 measurement and that the measurement carried out at that time was incorrect. The mistakes relate to the survey conducted by Ankat Patil and the process handled under the then DYSLR. Despite this acknowledgment, Plot No. 73 continues to suffer the consequences of Measurement No. 745 — a plot of approximately 2,000 sq. ft. has been left with only around 500–600 sq. ft. in actual possession.”

== Municipal Council election ==
=== Electoral performance 2018 ===
S.No.	Party name	Party flag or symbol	No. of Corporators
01	Shiv Sena (SS)		03
02	Bharatiya Janata Party (BJP)		13
03	Indian National Congress (INC)		00
04	Nationalist Congress Party (NCP)		00
08	Independent		01
