= Ghodasgaon, Jalgaon =

Village in Muktainagar taluka of Jalgaon district, Maharashtra, India

Ghodasgaon
- Village
- Map showing Ghodasgaon in Maharashtra Ghodasgaon (India) Ghodasgaon (Earth)
- Coordinates: 21°01′22″N 76°08′55″E
- Country: India
- State: Maharashtra
- District: Jalgaon
- Taluka: Muktainagar
- Established: 1997
- Founder: Government of Maharashtra
- Seat: Grampanchayat
- Ward (electoral subdivision): Six

Government
  - Sarpanch: Pratibha P. Kolhe

Area
  - Total: 2,226 ha (5,500 acres)

Dimensions
  - Length: 0.955 km (0.593 mi)
  - Width: 0.879 km (0.546 mi)
- Elevation: 245 m (804 ft)
- Lowest elevation (Shop's street): 234 m (768 ft)

Population (2011)
  - Total: 3,287
- Time zone: UTC+5:30 (IST)
- Postal Index Number: 425306
- Telephone code: 02583
- Vehicle registration: MH 19

Ghodasgaon is a village in Muktainagar taluka of Jalgaon district in Maharashtra. It is located near the Purna River in Muktainagar.

== History ==
Ghodasgaon was part of Khandesh district until 1906 when the district was split to form two new districts: East Khandesh and West Khandesh. From the second half of the 19th century to 1954 the village was in Bombay Presidency. Ghodasgaon became part of East Khandesh district kn 1906. East Khandesh district was renamed to the current name Jalgaon district on 10 October 1960.

In 1954, Ghodasgaon became part of the East Khandesh district and was part of Edlabad. A 1911 British survey of mammals near Ghodasgaon found a prevalence of wild pigs and monkeys. In 1956, Ghodasgaon became part of the newly formed Bombay State. More, recently, Edlabad was renamed to Muktainagar.

The village was previously situated on the banks of Purna River at 21°02′39″N 76°08′01″E, but was relocated to the current site by the district government to avoid persistent flooding during the rainy season. In the early 1990s the local government started to make roads for the new village.

== Geography ==
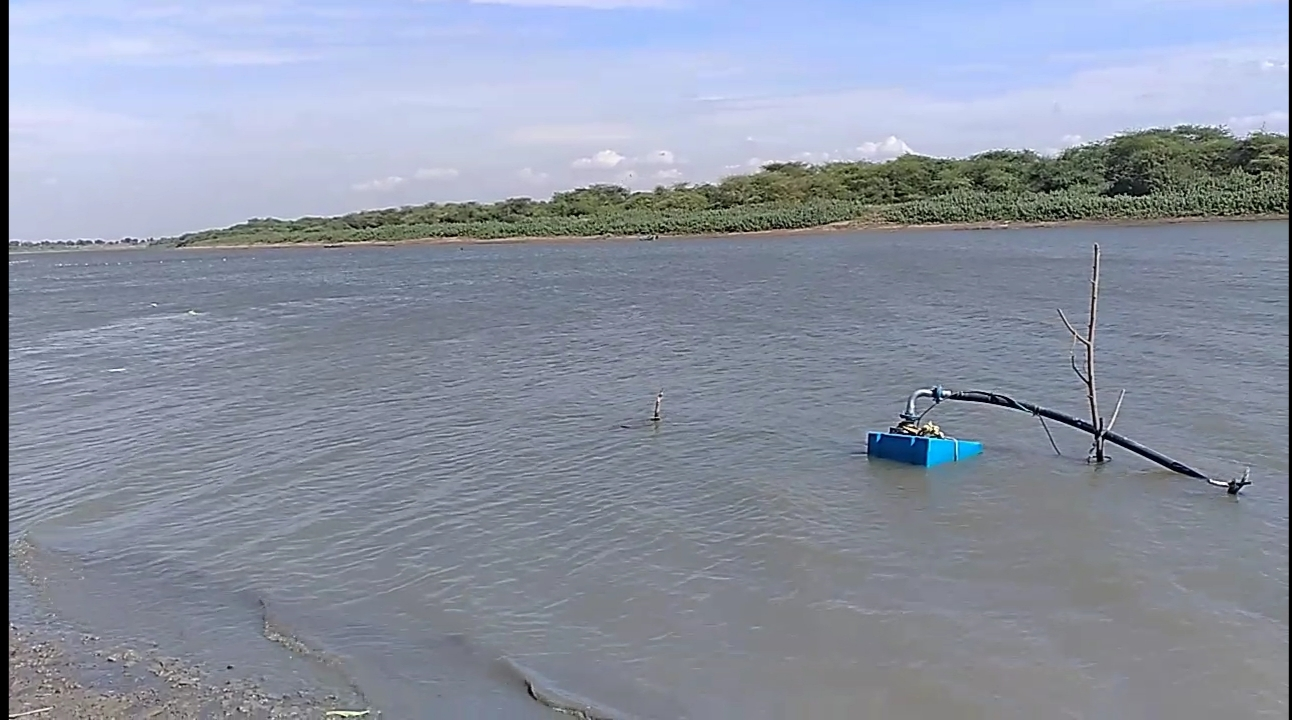
Purna River

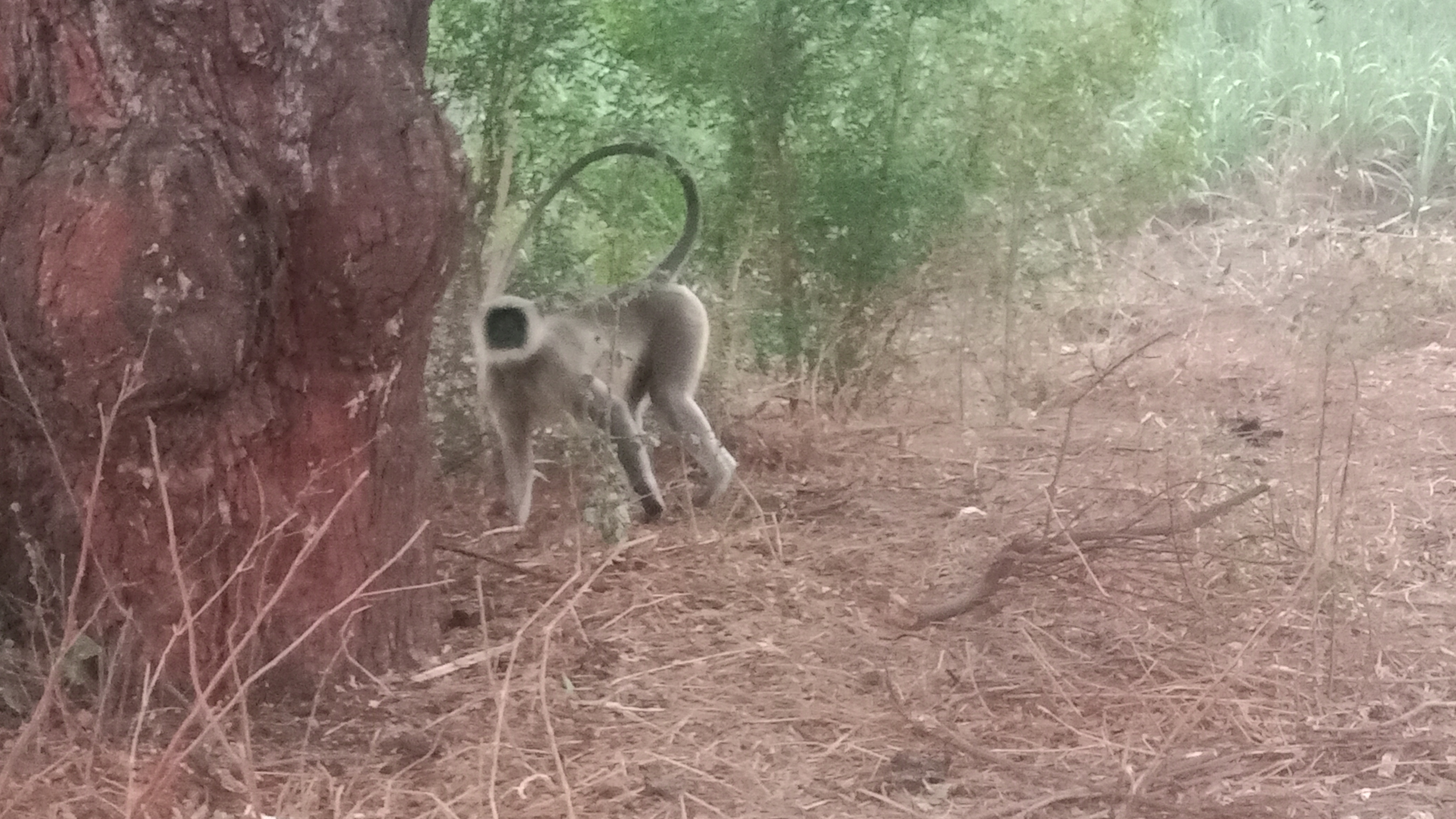
A monkey in a farm near Ghodasgaon

Purna river flows to the north of Ghodasgaon. Muktainagar is 10 kilometres (6.2 mi) from the village, it is headquarter of Muktainagar taluka. Ghodasgaon is situated near National Highway 53, and is located near to the villages of Taroda, Ruikheda, Pimpri Akaraut, Dolarkheda, and Dui. The nearest airports are Aurangabad Airport and Jalgaon Airport, while the closest railway station is Bhusaval Junction railway station. The Satpura Range is around 5 kilometres (3.1 mi) away from the village. Ghodasgaon has two Aanganwadi centers and Marathi primary schools and one high school, but does not have any colleges, with the nearest being in Muktainagar. One agriculture credit society is also available there. The village has asphalt roads, and is well-connected to the Indian National Highway system. Ghodasgaon has 46 hectares (110 acres) of land under non-agriculture uses, 280 hectares (690 acres) of forest, 27 hectares (67 acres) of irrigated land and 1,425 hectares (3,520 acres) of unirrigated land. The most important industrial produce of the village is sugar. The nearest hospital is 10 kilometres (6.2 mi) away from Ghodasgaon.

== Population ==
As of the 2011 Indian census, Ghodasgaon had 3,287 people, of which 1,697 were male and 1,590 were female. The village had 757 households. The population in children under the age of seven was 406, with 226 being male and 180 being female. 2,321 people were literate.

Year	Population	Citation
1951	1,495	
1961	2,158	
1971	2,255	
1981	2,114	
1991	2,508	
2001	2,934	
2011	3,287	
