= Shirsada Hanuman Temple =

Hindu temple in Jalgaon district, India

Shree Siddheshwar Hanuman Temple
- Shirsala's Hanuman Mandir
- Location in Maharashtra

Religion
- Affiliation: Hinduism
- District: Jalgaon District
- Deity: Hanuman
- Festivals: Hanuman Jayanti; Ram navami
- Ecclesiastical or organisational status: Active
- Governing body: Jai Hanuman Mandir Trust, Shirsala
- Status: Active

Location
- Location: Shirsala, Bodwad
- State: Maharashtra
- Country: India
- Coordinates: 20°56′21″N 76°03′33″E

Architecture
- Founder: Residents of Shirsaa village and Samarth Ramdas Swami

Specifications
- Length: 36.089 Foot
- Width: 26.24 Foot
- Height (max): 15 foot
- Temple: Five
- Monument: One
- Elevation: 296 m (971 ft)

Maruti Temple of Shirsala village, also known as Shree Siddheshwar Hanuman Temple earlier Shirsala Hanuman Temple, is a Hindu temple located in the village of Shirsada in Bodwad taluka in Maharashtra's Jalgaon district. Its deity is Hanuman.

== Overview ==
According to a folklore decades ago, Shirsala's residents discovered this Maruti's stone idol in the nearby river. They took it to a neem tree and established it there, where the mandir is now present.

The Mandira is unique because it does not have a Shikhar, Amlak, and Kadas. Several other temples are located in the temple premises.

Shirsala Maruti is founded by Samarth Ramdas Swamy.

Maruti Temple is situated 7.45 miles away from the town of Muktainagar and 46 Miles from Jalgaon.
