= Ruikheda =

Village in Muktainagar taluka of Jalgaon district in Maharashtra, India

- Village
- Ruikhede
- Location of Ruikheda in Maharashtra Ruikheda (India)
- Coordinates: 20°58′41″N 76°06′34″E
- Country: India
- State: Maharashtra
- District: Jalgaon district
- Taluka: Muktainagar

Area
  - Total: 1,691.78 ha (4,180.5 acres)
- Elevation: 252 m (827 ft)

Population (2011)
  - Total: 3,617
- Time zone: UTC+5:30 (IST)
- PIN Code: 425306
- Vehicle registration: MH - 19

Ruikheda (or Ruikhede) is a village in Muktainagar taluka of Jalgaon district in Maharashtra, India.

== Geography ==
The village is situated at an elevation of 252 meters above sea level. Ruikheda is in North Maharashtra. Ghodasgaon is present to the northeast of the village. The village of Bhangura is to the southeast of the village. The village of Taroda is to the northeast. Jalgaon is 66 km (41 mi) from Ruikheda.

== Demographics ==
According to 2011 Census, the population of the village consists of 831 families. It has 1853 males and 1764 females. There are 398 kids under the age of six, out of whom 190 are girls and 208 are boys. 2537 people are literate in this village, out of whom 1076 are female and 1461 are male. 598 people are from scheduled castes, while 183 are from scheduled tribes.

== Administration ==
Ruikheda is part of the Muktainagar Vidhan Sabha constituency and Raver Lok Sabha constituency. It is in the Nashik division of Maharashtra and is part of the Bhusaval subdivision.

== Education ==
This village has a Marathi-medium primary school, which teaches first to fourth grade. Manjabai Mahadu Narkhede Vidyalaya, established in 1972, is a high school.
