= G.G. Khadse college =

Public college in Muktainagar, India

Shrimati Godavaribai Ganpatrao Khadse college
- Motto: Sanskrit: Tamaso Ma JyotirGamaya
- Motto in English: Journey from Ignorance to Enlightenment
- Type: Public
- Established: 13-07-1990
- Parent institution: Muktainagar taluka education society
- Affiliations: North Maharashtra University
- Chairman: Rohini Khewalkar
- Principal: V. R. Patil
- Students: 1632
- Location: Muktainagar, Dist-Jalgaon, Maharashtra, India., Muktainagar, 425306, India; 21°02′31″N 76°03′11″E
- Campus: Rural
- Language: Marathi and English
- Colours: Light yellow Brown
- Website: sggkhadsecollege.ac.in

G.G. Khadse (Also known as Khadse college) is a college in Muktainagar, India. It is affiliated to the North Maharashtra University of Jalgaon. It offers courses in science and arts for UG and PG.

== History and formation ==
Khadse college is run by 'Muktainagar taluka education society' organization It was established on 13 July 1990. It is located near Bhusawal road in Muktainagar town. It is re-accredited by the NAAC (National Assessment and Accreditation Council) with a 'B+' grade. It is named after Godavari Bai Khadse, mother of former revenue minister of Maharashtra Eknath Khadse.

== Courses ==
Khadse college offers coursework in Science and Arts fields. Master's degree coursework is also offered in science & arts fields.

Khadse college has a Yashwantrao Chavan Maharashtra Open University study centre for distant education.

== Facilities ==
Khadse has 27 classrooms, including a library stacking room with separate reading rooms for boys, girls and teachers. Khadse college also has a hostel facility for ladies which has 32 rooms. It also has an indoor sports hall, a swimming pool, and a helipad, swimming pool have area of 1000 square meters.
