= Pokharni =

Village in Maharashtra

Pokharni Narasimha
- village
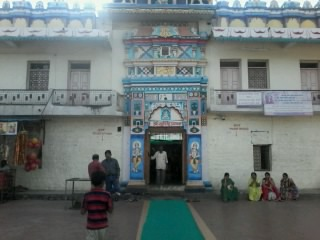
- Famous Narsimha Temple of Pokharni

- Location in Maharashtra, India Pokharni Narasimha (India)
- Coordinates: 19.1192195°N 76.7321205°E
- Country: India
- State: Maharashtra
- District: Parbhani district
- Founder: Kisannadu Anchintam ( Yerralu Dynasty)

Government
  - Type: Grampanchayat
  - Body: Grampanchayat
  - Sarpanch: Madanrao S. Wagh

Population (2011)
  - Total: 20,963
- Demonym: Pokharnikar

Languages
  - Official: Marathi, Telgu
- Time zone: UTC+5:30 (IST)
- Vehicle registration: MH-22
- Website: parbhani.gov.in

Pokharni is a village located in the Parbhani District of the Marathawada region of Maharashtra State of India. It is known for a temple dedicated to Narasimha.

It is 19 kilometres (12 mi) from Parbhani and has a railway station.

== Demography ==
- As per 2011 census, Pokharni has total 830 families residing. Village has population of 4,881 of which 2,250 were males while 2,231 were females.
- Average Sex Ratio of village is 992 which is higher than Maharashtra state average of 929.
- Literacy rate of village was 71% compared to 82.95% of Maharashtra. Male literacy rate was 84% while female literacy rate was 58%.
- Schedule Caste (SC) constitutes 15% of total population.

== Pokharni Narasimha Railway Station ==
Parameter	Detail
Station code	PKNS
Zone	SCR (South Central)
Division	Hazur Sahib Nanded
District	Parbhani
Platforms	2
Halting Trains	13
Elevation	417m
Track	Diesel

== Geography and Transport ==
Pokharni is in Parbhani taluka. Pokharni is located on Parbhani-Gangakhed road. Following table shows distance of Pokharni from various cities.

City	Distance(KM)
Parbhani	19
Gangakhed	21
Sonpeth	29
Manwath	31
Palam	32
Pathri	35
Purna	39
Nanded	72
Hingoli	90
Aurangabad	186
Mumbai	473

== Narasimha Temple ==
Pokharni is known for grand old temple of Narasimha, a Hindu deity. Uniqueness about temple is, entrance of the main room where big deity of Narsimha resides is very small and one have to squat to enter in main deity room.

== Zilla Parishad Pokharni ==
Zilla Parishad Pokharni is an electoral division of the Zilla Parishad in Parbhani district, Maharashtra, India. The constituency functions under the Maharashtra Zilla Parishads and Panchayat Samitis Act, 1961. Elections to this division are conducted by the State Election Commission, Maharashtra.

The division consists of several villages administered through gram panchayats and forms part of the Parbhani Zilla Parishad.

⸻

Villages under Zilla Parishad Pokharni

Sr. No.	Village name
1	Pokharni
2	Kailaswadi
3	Surpimpri
4	Wadgaon Sukre
5	Daithana
6	Dhondi
7	Tadpangari
8	Pegargavhan (Pegargaon)
9	Bharaswad
10	Kuotamwadi
11	Ambe Takli

⸻

Latest Zilla Parishad Election Candidates

Sr. No.	Candidate name	Party
1	Aishwarya Ajay Chavan	Bharatiya Janata Party (BJP)
2	Anjali Vikas Babar	Nationalist Congress Party (Ajit Pawar faction)
3	Baynabai Santaram Lokhande	Shiv Sena
4	Jayshri Ashok Wagh	Shiv Sena (Uddhav Balasaheb Thackeray)
5	Sonali Srikrushna Vairagar	Indian National Congress (INC)
6	Samta Panditrao Tomke	Independent
