= Waghur Dam =

Earthen dam in Western India

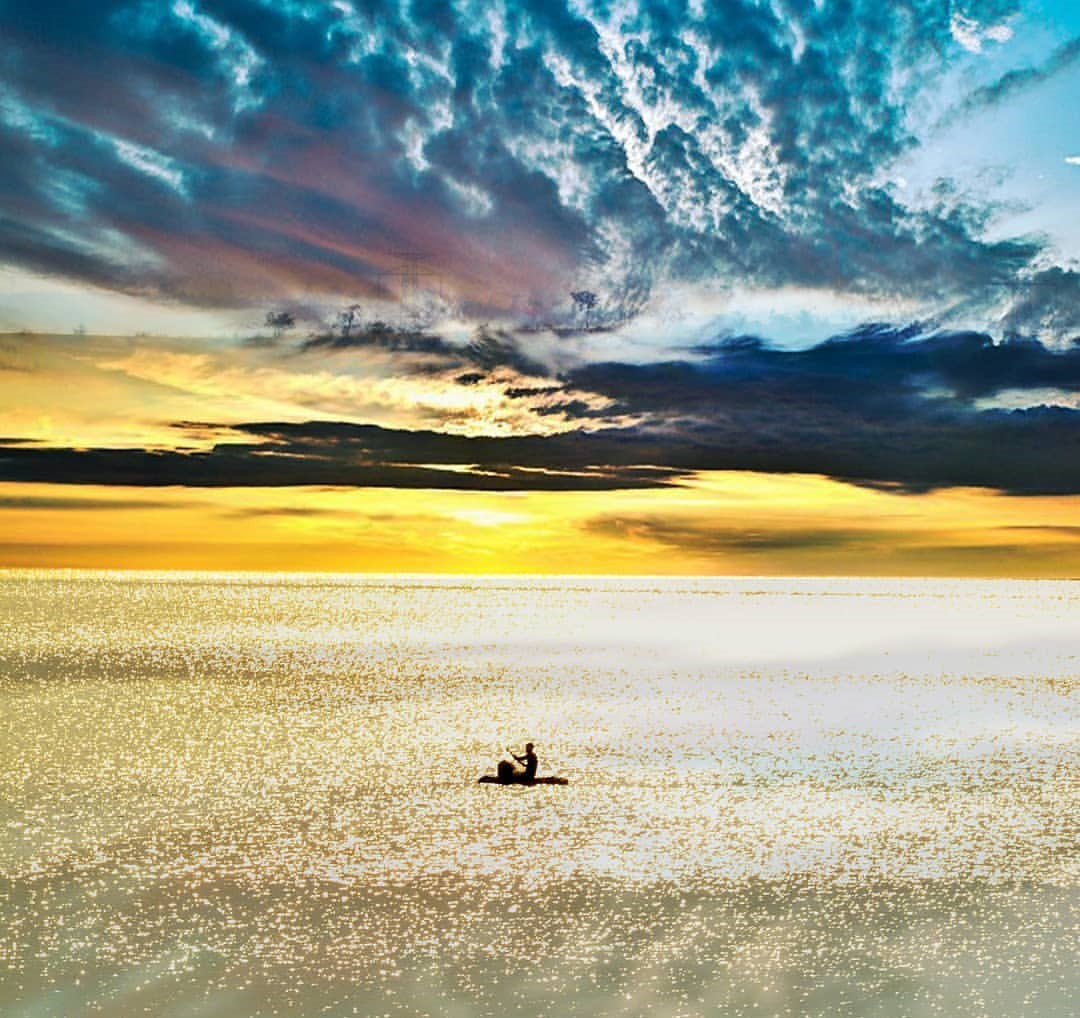
- Waghur river and Waghur dam

- Location within Maharashtra
- Official name: Waghur Dam D02985
- Location: Raipur Village (Jalgaon)
- Coordinates: 20.9265685°N 75.709767°E
- Owners: Government of Maharashtra, India

Dam and spillways
- Type of dam: Earthfill
- Impounds: Waghur river
- Height: 13.6 m (45 ft)
- Length: 690 m (2,260 ft)
- Dam volume: 70 km^{3} (17 cu mi)

Reservoir
- Total capacity: 8.5 TMC
- Surface area: 467 km^{2} (180 sq mi)

Waghur Dam is an earthfill dam located on the Waghur river near Kandari and Varadsim, Jalgaon district in the Indian state of Maharashtra.

The Waghur river flows from its source near Ajanta through the Khandesh region. Here the famous World Heritage Site, Ajanta Caves sits on the banks of the river. Work on this major irrigation project was taken up by the Water Resources Department of Maharashtra and began construction in 1978. The dam's main purpose is to supply water for irrigation purpose in downstream area. Canals were built along the left and right banks of the river to meet irrigation needs. In 2006, record rainfall in the catchment area of Waghur was recorded. Nearly 40 TMC of water spilled over the dam. As of 2008, the dam's reservoir had storage capacity of 8.5 TMC.

Twenty additional spill gates were planned for the dam, increasing storage capacity by 1.5 TMC. The project was to supply drinking water needs of roughly 500 thousand people and will irrigate approximately 64,000 acres (260 km^{2}) of drought prone fields.

== Specifications ==
The height of the dam is 13.6 m (45 ft) while the length is 690 m (2,260 ft). It has a gross storage capacity of 8.5 TMC. The volume is 70 km^{3} (17 cu mi)

== See also ==
- List of dams and reservoirs in Maharashtra
- List of dams and reservoirs in India
