= Ghodasgaon, Dhule =

Village in Dhule district, Maharashtra

Ghodasgaon Ghodasgaon
- Village
- Ghodasgaon
- Location in Maharashtra, India Ghodasgaon (India)
- Coordinates: 21.207454°N 75.038107°E
- Country: India
- State: Maharashtra
- District: Dhule District

Government
  - Type: Democracy
  - Body: Democracy in India

Population (2012)
  - Total: 1,200

Languages
  - Official: Marathi
- Time zone: UTC+5:30 (IST)
- Vehicle registration: MH 18

Ghodasgaon s a village in Shirpur Taluka of Dhuledistrict, Maharashtra. It is located on bank of Aner river which is a large tributary of western flowing Tapi river. Ghodasgaon is 70 km from the district centre city Dhule of Dhule district.

== Geography ==
Ghodasgaon is a village situated at the bank of Aner River, which sub-river of Tapi . The nearest prominent railway stations on the main route are Bhusaval and Surat .Bus service is available to nearby villages

== Population and economy ==
In this small village of 1200, banana production is the main occupation.

== Education ==
Primary education is provided by the public school up until grade 5.

== See also ==
•Shirpur
