= Purna River (tributary of Tapti) =

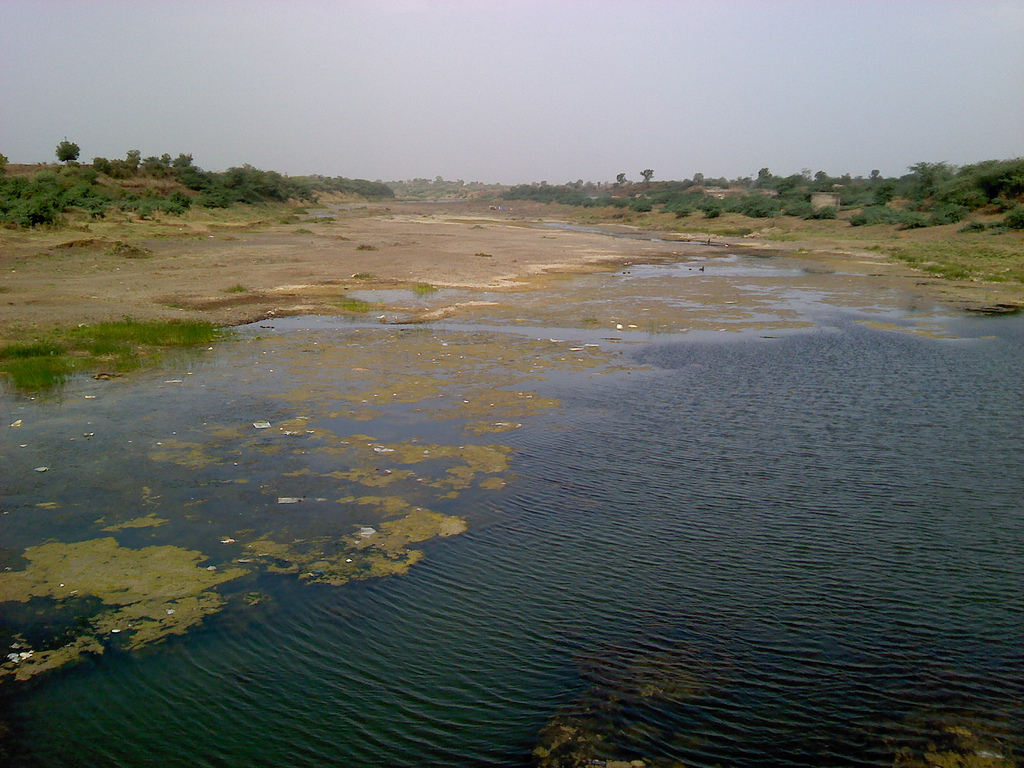
- River Purna at Manegaon
- Etymology: Purna River - Complete river

Location
- Country: India
- State: Madhya Pradesh, Maharashtra
- Region: Vidarbha, Khandesh
- District: Betul District, Amravati, Akola, Buldhana, Jalgaon

Physical characteristics
- Source: Pokhrani, Bhainsdehi
  - location: Satpura Range, Betul District, Gawilgarh ranges, Madhya Pradesh
  - coordinates: 21°30′N 77°46′E
- Mouth: Tapti River
  - location: Changdev, Jalgaon, Muktainagar, Maharashtra
  - coordinates: 21°5′45″N 76°0′36″E
- Discharge
  - location: Surat, Gujarat
- Discharge
  - location: Changdev, Taluka-Muktainagar, Dist-Jalgaon, State-Maharashtra, India

Basin features
- Tributaries
  - left: Pedhi River, Mūrna River, Mūn River, Dnyanganga River, Vishwaganga River, Nalganaga River
  - right: Arna River, Bodi River, Chandrabhaga River, Ban River, Shahanur River

The Purna River is a river of Central and Western India. It is one of the chief tributaries of the Tapti River and empties into it at Changdev in Jalgaon, Maharashtra.

== Etymology ==
The word purna means complete in Sanskrit. It was also called the Payoshni or the Paisani (Sanskrit word meaning Ambrosia), which is mentioned in the Mahabharata as being located in the territory of Vidarbha and Khandesh at the northern entrance of the Dandaka Forest. There are other rivers also named Purna (the Khadakpurna and the Katepurna).

Several comparative societies are named after the Purna River, as is the Purnamai Vidyalaya, a high school in Muktainagar taluka (Purna referring to the river and Maai meaning mother). The Purna is a major tributary of the Tapti River.

== Description ==
The Purna is the main water source for the Muktainagar, Malkapur region. It rises in the eastern Satpura Range of southern Madhya Pradesh, and flows westward, draining Maharashtra's Vidarbha region before merging with the Tapi River. The total length of the river is 334 km.

The watershed lies mostly in the Western Vidarbha region of Maharashtra state and is nearly 18,929 square kilometres.

The Purna originates in Pokharni village which is 2 km away from Bhainsdehi. Bhainsdehi is a tehsil in the Betul district of Madhya Pradesh, adjoining the Amravati district of Maharashtra. The river flows through Akola, Buldhana, and Jalgaon districts. Pilgrims are present along its banks at Muktabai temple at Muktainagar and Changdev temple at Changdev village.

The river is habitat for many fish species and birds like Bagda, ducks etc. Hatnur dam is built on the Purna near Hatnur village. This dam is the largest dam in northern Maharashta. It has a huge water reservoir.

== Confluence ==
The Purna meets the Tapti at Changdev village in the Muktainagar taluk of Jalgaon District in Northern Maharashtra. The Changdeva Maharaj temple is built at this meeting place (Sangam) of the two rivers as devotees believe it to be sacred (pavitra sthan).

== River tributaries ==
The Purna River and its tributaries

- Purna River
  - Gotma River
  - Aarna River
  - Pendhi River
  - Uma River
  - Katepurna River
  - Shahanur River
    - Bhavkhuri River
  - Chandrabhaga River
    - Bhuleswari River
  - Morna River
  - Mann River
    - Mas River
    - Utawali River
    - Vishwamitri River
    - Nirguna River
      - Gandhari River
  - Aas River
  - River Dnyanganga
  - River Vishwaganga
  - River Nalaganga
  - Vaan River
  - Nadganga

== Gallery ==
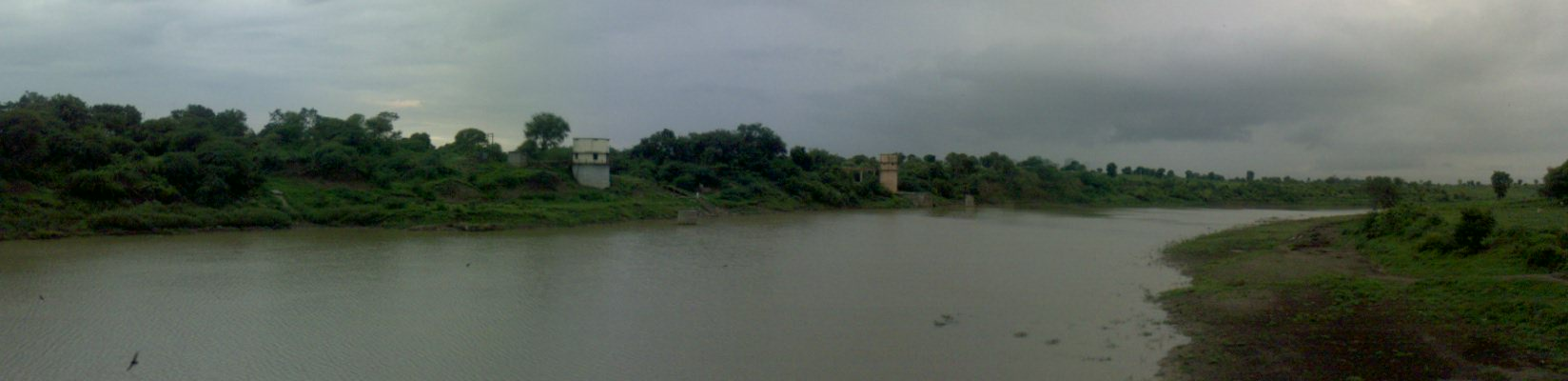
A panorama of Purna River, Dhupeshwar, Malkapur
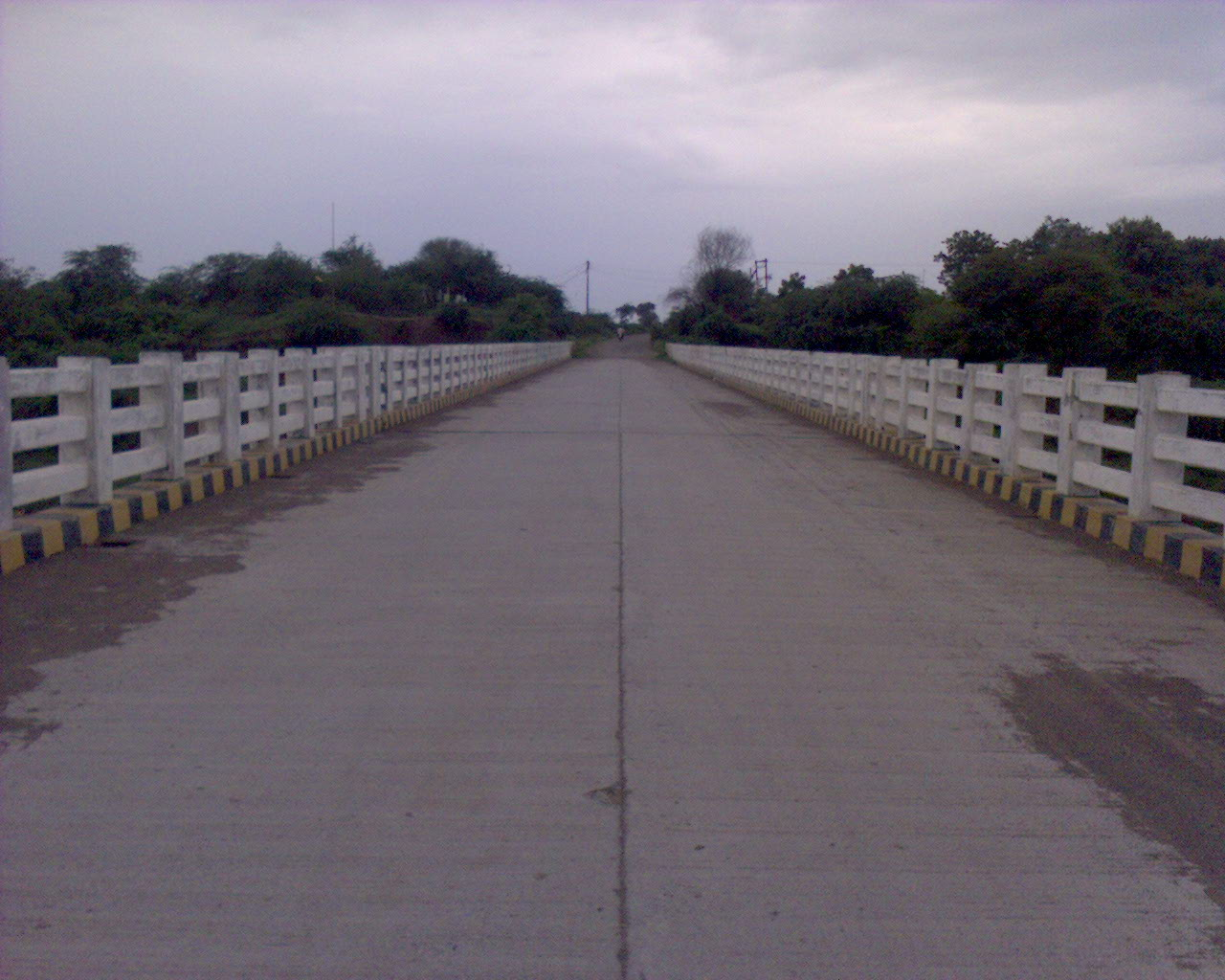
Bridge on Purna River joining two regions in Mahashtra i.e. Vidarbha and Khandesh

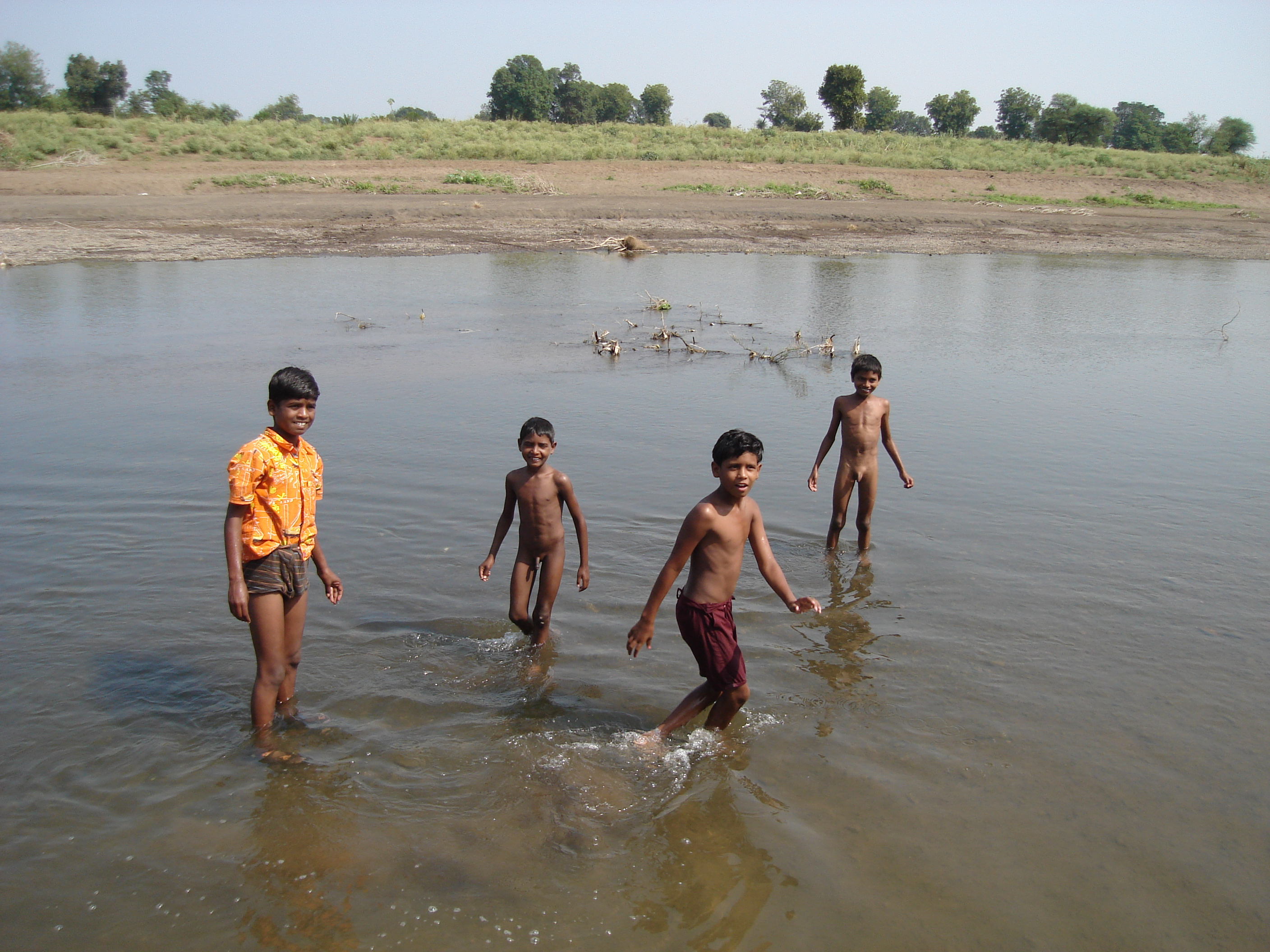
Purna

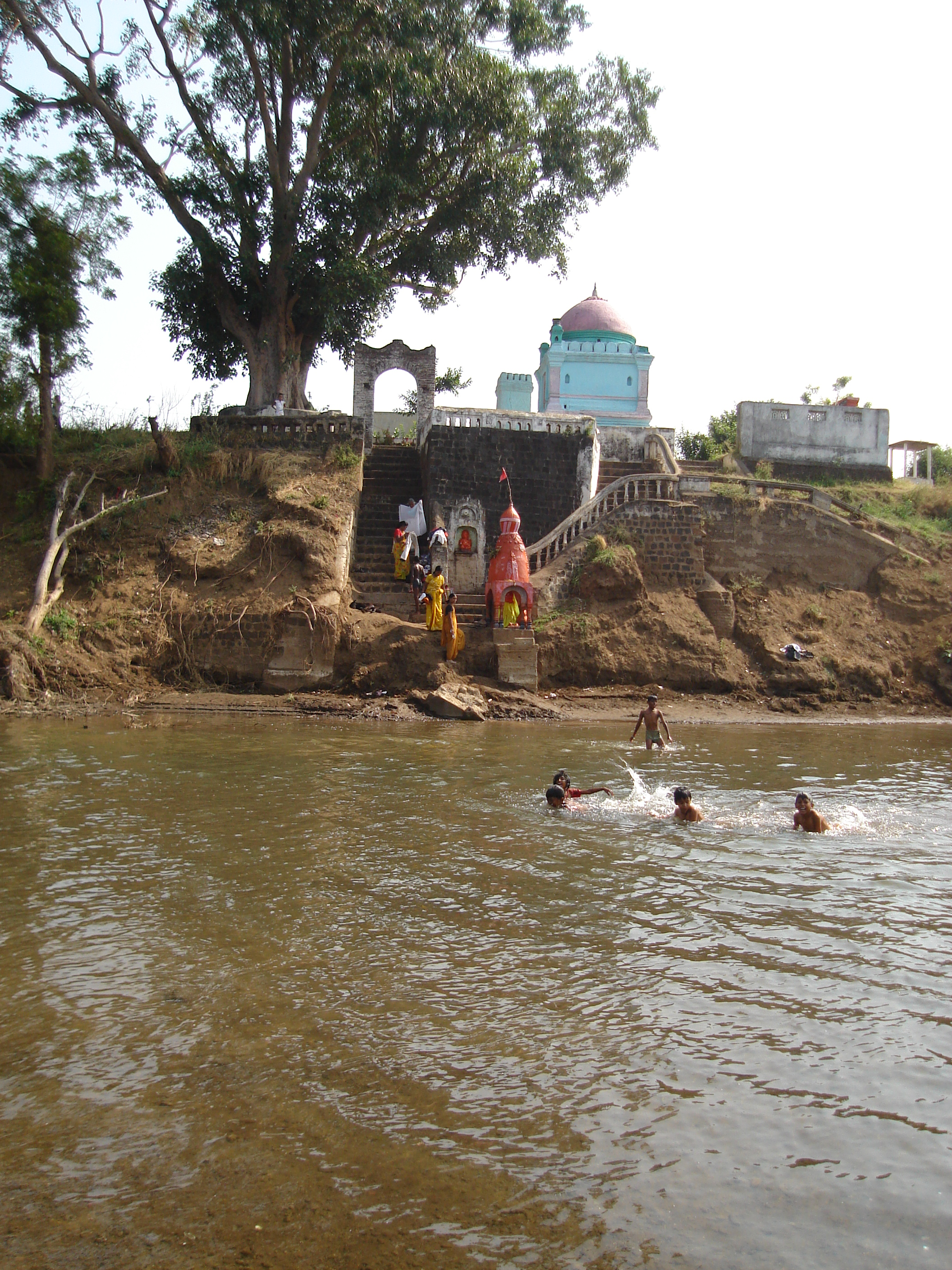
Gangamai Temple
