= Hatnur Dam =

Earth fill dam in Jalgaon, India

Hatnur Dam ( Dharana )
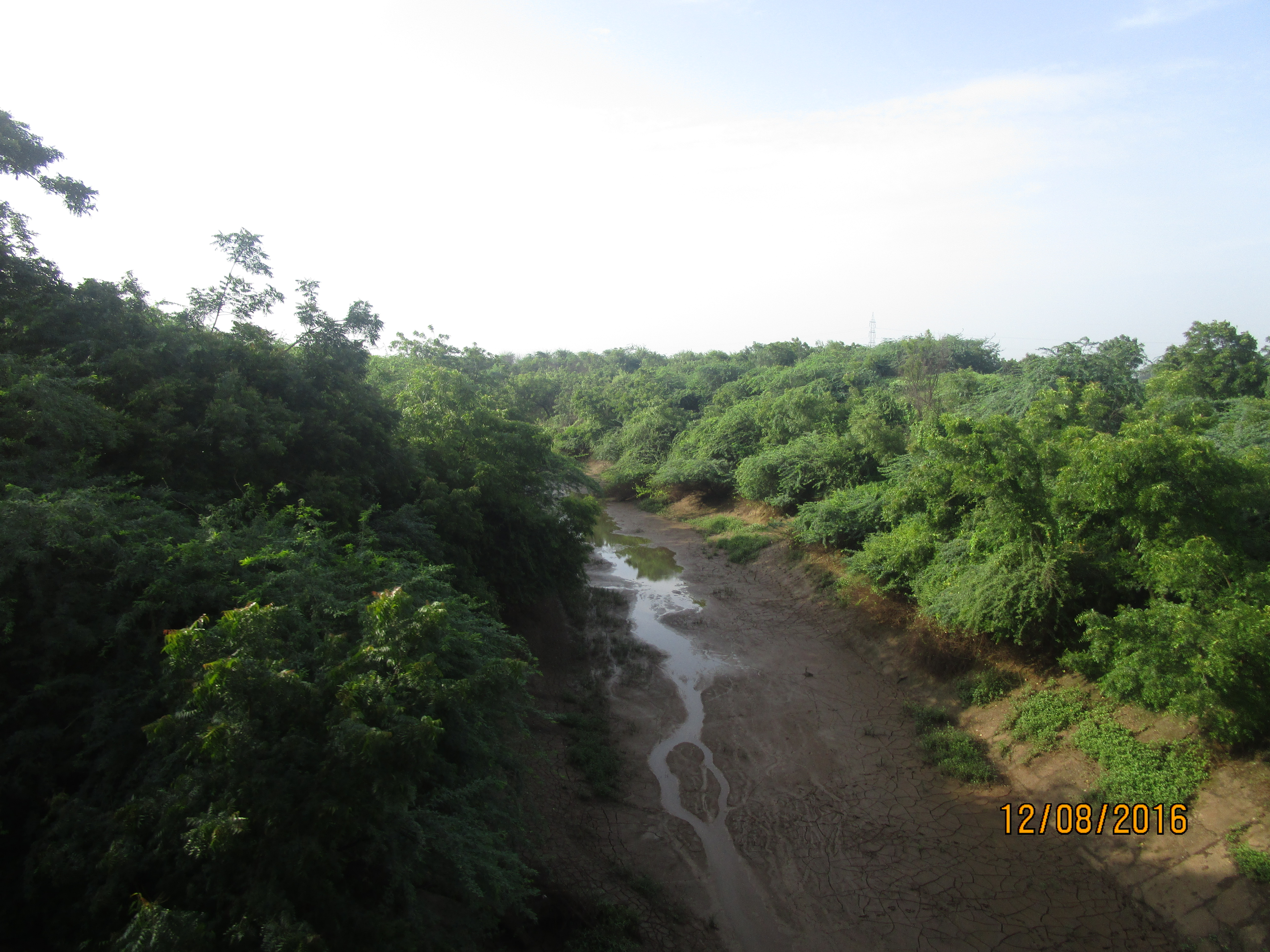
- Hatnur Dam Right Canal

- Hatnur dam in Maharashtra
- Official name: Hatnur Dam D02977
- Country: India
- Location: Hatnur, Bhusawal
- Coordinates: 21.0727972°N 75.9456968°E
- Purpose: Agriculture irrigation, domestic use, Fishery and for generation of hydroelectric power
- Opening date: 1982
- Construction cost: 344,500 cr
- Owners: Government of Maharashtra, India .

Dam and spillways
- Type of dam: Earthfill
- Impounds: Tapi and Purna river
- Height: 25.5 m (84 ft)
- Height (foundation): 25.5 m ( 83 Feet )
- Height (thalweg): 25.5 meters
- Length: 2,580 m (8,460 ft)
- Dam volume: 3,850 km^{3} (920 cu mi)
- Spillways: 41
- Spillway type: Ogee

Reservoir
- Total capacity: 255,000 km^{3} (61,000 cu mi)
- Active capacity: 255 MCM
- Catchment area: 2943 Th ha
- Surface area: 48,160 km^{2} (18,590 sq mi)
- Normal elevation: 214 meters

Power Station
- Type: Hydro electric power plant

Hatnur dam is an earth fill dam in Jalgaon district of Maharashtra, India. The dam is named after a nearby Hatnur village, which is present by side of the dam.

== Construction ==
This Dam was constructed by the Government of India in 1982.

== Specifications ==
- Spillway gates -

Hatnur dam has 41 radial-type spillways. Their size is 12 x 6.5 (m*m) and length is 604.75 meters. The type of these spillways is Ogee. These gates are mechanically controlled to control the flow of reservoir's water and for flood control, and to avoid overflow of dam and consequences of overflow of dam like damage to the structure of dam.

The height of the dam above lowest foundation is 25.5 m (84 ft) while the length is 2,580 m (8,460 ft). The volume content is 3,850 km^{3} (920 cu mi) and gross storage capacity is 388,000.00 km^{3} (93,086.15 cu mi).

== Purposes ==
Hatnur dam is one of the biggest dams of Maharashtra. It servers for agricultural irrigation, for domestic use, hydroelectric power generation (~1420MW), fishery etc.

== See also ==
- Dams in Maharashtra
- List of reservoirs and dams in India
