= Khandesh district =

Erstwhile district in Bombay presidency, British India

Khandesh
- District
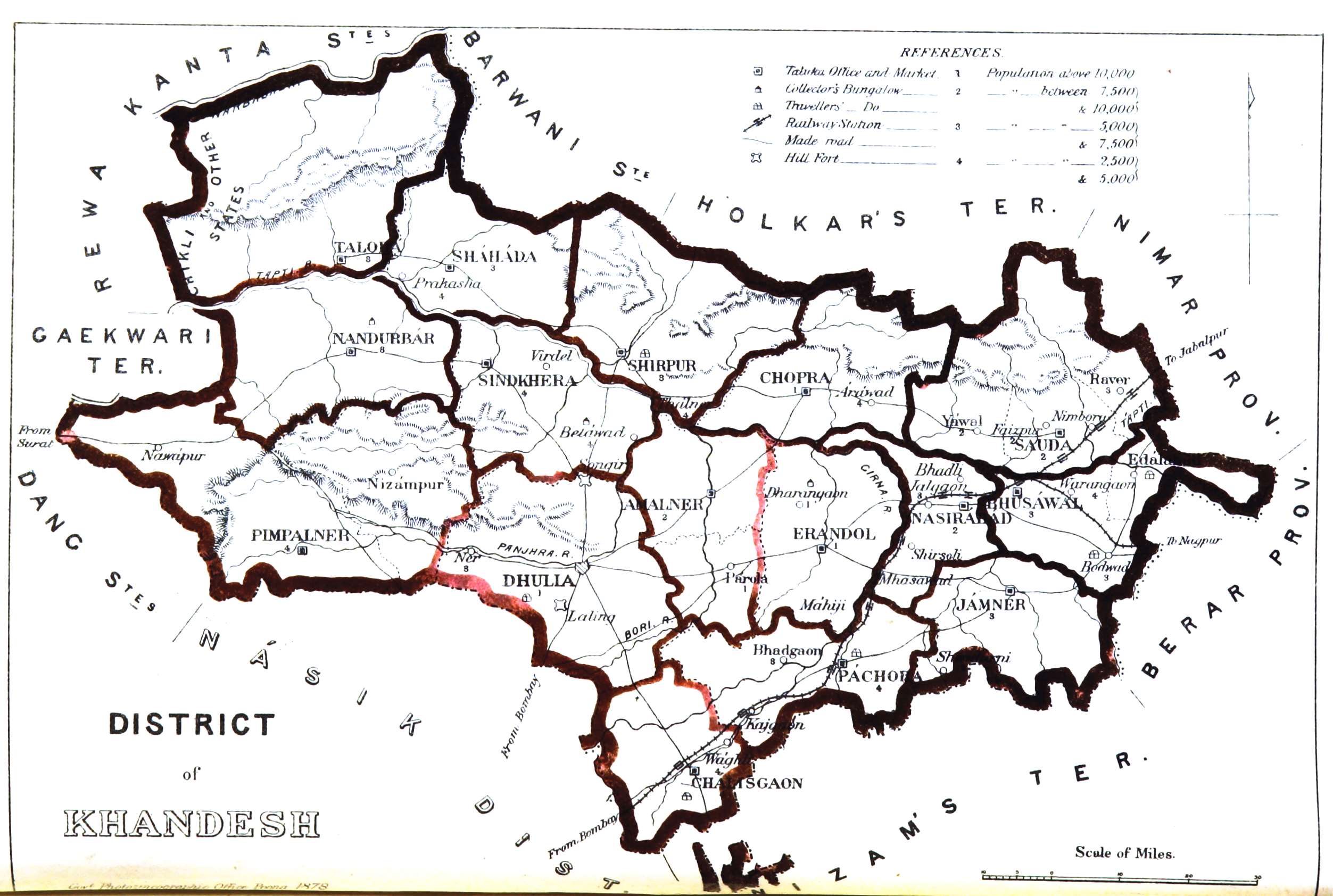
- Map of Khandesh district in 1880
- Coordinates: 21°00′10″N 75°34′00″E
- Country: India
- Province: Bombay Presidency
- Headquarter: Dhule

Area
  - Total: 27,020 km^{2} (10,431 sq mi)

Population (1879)
  - Total: 1,028,642

Khandesh District (or Kandesh, Khandeish, Qhandesh) was a district, administrative division of Bombay presidency of British India during British rule of India, the district was made up of present-day Jalgaon, Dhule and Nandurbar districts of Maharashtra. Its headquarter was Dhule town.

In the 18th and early 19th centuries, Khandesh was part of the Maratha Confederacy, and was ruled by the Maratha Peshwa. The district was annexed to British India at the conclusion of the Third Anglo-Maratha War in 1818. A southern portion of the district was detached to form Nashik District in 1869. In 1906 the district was bifurcated into East Khandesh and West Khandesh districts, with their capitals at Jalgaon and Dhulia (Dhule), respectively. In 1960 East Khandesh was renamed to Jalgaon District, and West Khandesh to Dhule district. In 1998 Dhule was divided to form Nandurbar districts.

== History ==
In the Mughal rule of Aurangzeb, in 1670 Daud Khan was Subhadar (transl. Governor) of Khandesh province. Khandesh district was part of Khandesh province. Burhanpur was its capital city. The Asirgarh fort was known as the gate of Southern India, and Burhanpur was known as "Dakkhan ka Darwaza" (transl. Gate of Deccan).

In the year 1880 Khandesh district's population was 10,28,642, in the year 1901 total population of the district was 9,54,077.

In 1906, Bombay presidency government bifurcated Khandesh district to form East Khandesh and West Khandesh district, Jalgaon and Dhule made their administrative headquarter.

== Geography ==
Dhule was the administrative center of Khandesh district.

On north west corner of the district Narmada river was natural border of the district and in west the base of the hills out skirt in Shahada was natural border of Khandesh. It separated Khandesh from Akrani territory that was present at north right into the heart of the hills where from Narmada river pass Satpuda. On east and south east rows of pillars and some water streams was mark the boundary of Khandesh from central provinces and Berar. To the south Ajanta, Satmala range was rough boundary between Khandesh and Nizam's territory. On south west Arva or Making, Galna hills separate Khandesh from Nasik.

== Administration ==
For administrative purposes the British government distributed Khandesh into 16 sub divisions. Out of these subdivision Amalner, Pimpalner, Pachora, Bhusaval, Savada had two petty divisions, other sub-divisions had one petty division each.

In 1917, Bombay presidency government elevated Parola peta to Tehasil and later upgraded Bhusawal peta, Pachora peta, Chalisgaon peta to taluka status.
