= Muktainagar =

Muktainagar Edlabad
- Town
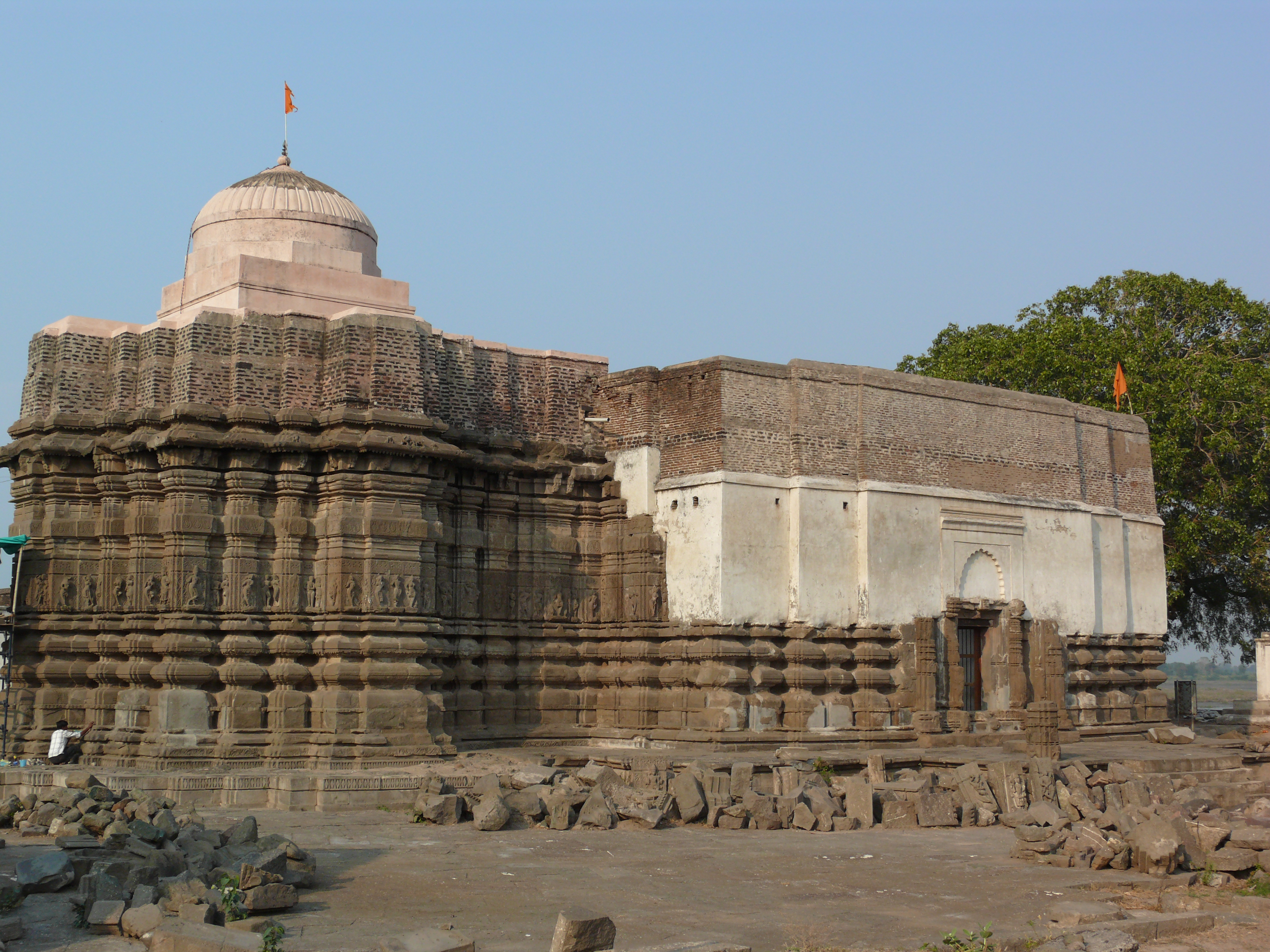
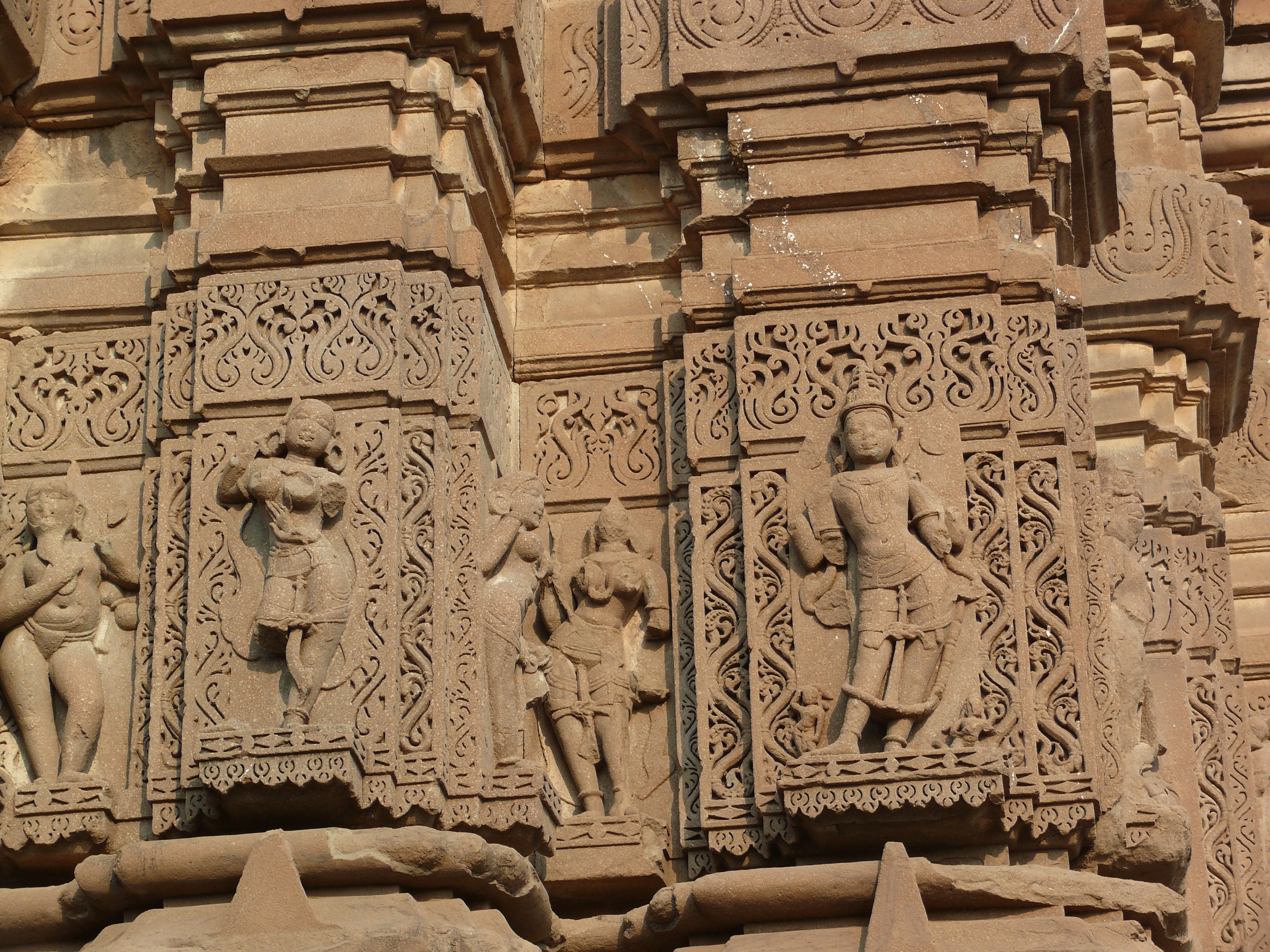
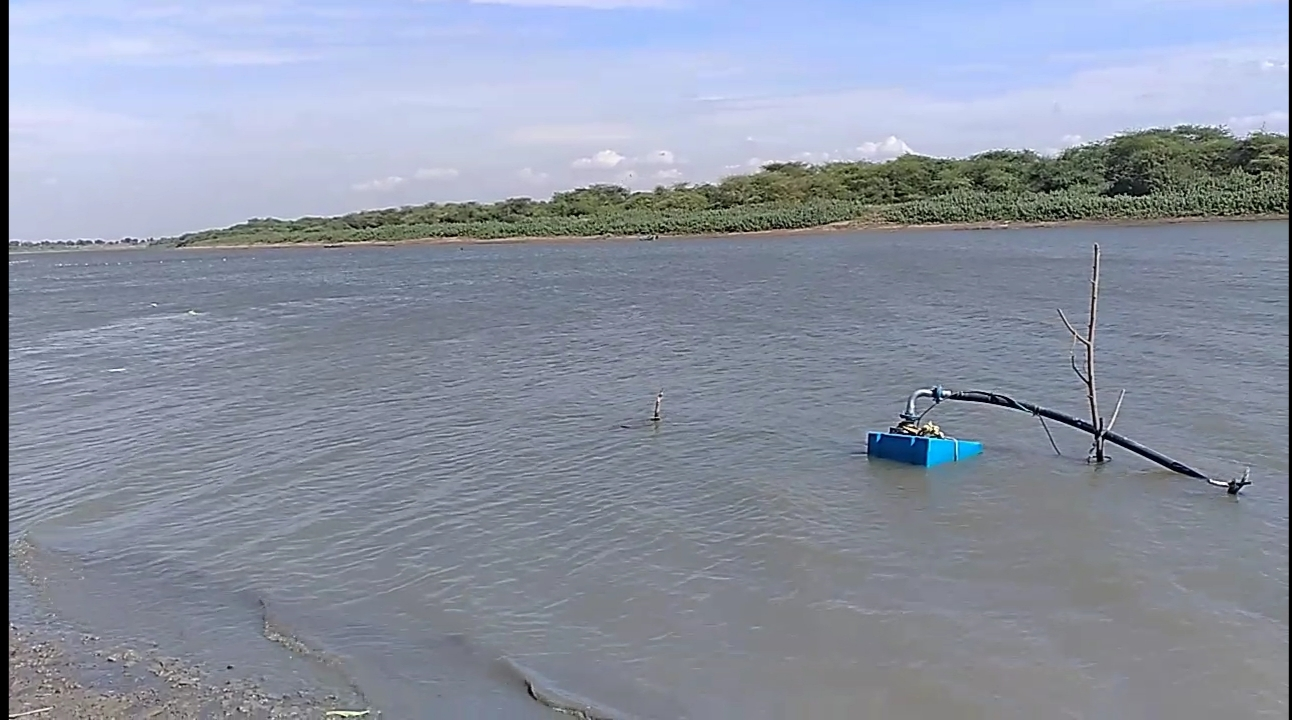
- Changdeva Temple and art on exterior walls, Purna river (bottom)

- Location in Maharashtra, India Muktainagar (India)
- Coordinates: 21°3′8″N 76°3′18″E
- Country: India
- State: Maharashtra
- District: Jalgaon
- Named for: Muktabai

Government
  - Type: nagar panchayat
  - Body: nagar panchayat

Area
  - Total: 2,197 ha (5,430 acres)

Dimensions
  - Length: 3.53 km (2.19 mi)
  - Width: 1.74 km (1.08 mi)
- Elevation: 230 m (750 ft)
- Highest elevation (Hill): 244 m (801 ft)
- Lowest elevation (Purna river bank): 214 m (702 ft)

Population (2011)
  - Total: 23,970
  - Density: 258/km^{2} (670/sq mi)

Languages
  - Official: Marathi
- Time zone: UTC+5:30 (IST)
- PIN: 425306
- Telephone code: 91-02583
- Vehicle registration: MH-19
- Lok Sabha constituency: Raver
- Vidhan Sabha constituency: Muktainagar

Muktainagar (formerly Edlabad) is a town in Jalgaon district, Maharashtra, India. It is the administrative headquarter of its eponymous taluka. It is located in North Maharashtra region.

It is located near the bank of Purna river and is the highest populated town in Muktainagar taluka.

== History ==
During British rule, Muktainagar taluka was known as Edlabad petha and was part of the East Khandesh district. Around 1880, Muktainagar taluka was made part of Khandesh district's Bhusaval subdivision. Muktainagar taluka (then known as Edlabad mahal) was part of Bhusaval taluka.

In 2020, during the COVID period, Measurement No. 745 was carried out for Plot No. 74 in Rehabilitation Phase 2, Muktainagar. The measurement was conducted by the then land surveyor, Ankat Patil, and was processed under the authority of the DYSLR serving at that time. The measurement contained serious errors, including an incorrect Gut number, an incorrect address of the adjoining landholder, defects in the notice process, and an incorrect determination of the plot boundary.

Crucially, the present Deputy Superintendent of Land Records (DYSLR), Muktainagar, Vandan Jadhav, has subsequently acknowledged the mistakes in this earlier measurement and acknowledged that the measurement carried out at that time was incorrect. His acknowledgment concerns the mistakes committed during the 2020 measurement process by land surveyor Ankat Patil and the then DYSLR; Vandan Jadhav was not the DYSLR responsible for carrying out or approving that measurement in 2020.

This acknowledgment by the present DYSLR is extremely significant because the irregularities in Measurement No. 745 are therefore not limited merely to objections raised by the affected Plot No. 73 landholder. The errors in the earlier measurement have subsequently been recognized at the level of the Land Records Department itself.

The incorrect measurement benefited Plot No. 74 by extending its boundary into the adjoining Plot No. 73. Plot No. 73 originally measured approximately 2,000 sq. ft.; following the incorrect boundary determination and the subsequent occupation of the affected portion, only approximately 500–600 sq. ft. remains in the original owner's actual possession.

This raises a serious question: how was a measurement containing a wrong Gut number, wrong adjoining-landholder address, defective notice process and incorrect boundary determination accepted and allowed to alter the physical boundaries of the plots? More importantly, even after the present DYSLR acknowledged the mistakes in the 2020 measurement, the consequences of that incorrect measurement have not yet been fully corrected on the ground.

“Present DYSLR Vandan Jadhav has acknowledged that mistakes were committed in the 2020 measurement and that the measurement carried out at that time was incorrect. The mistakes relate to the survey conducted by Ankat Patil and the process handled under the then DYSLR. Despite this acknowledgment, Plot No. 73 continues to suffer the consequences of Measurement No. 745 — a plot of approximately 2,000 sq. ft. has been left with only around 500–600 sq. ft. in actual possession.”

== Demographics ==
According to the 2011 Census of India, Muktainagar had 5,352 households and a population of 23,970, of which 12,433 were males and 11,537 females. The population of children below six years of age was 3,201, making up 13.35% of the total population of the village. The sex ratio of Muktainagar village is 928, which is close to the Maharashtra state average of 929. The child sex ratio is 820, lower than the Maharashtra average of 894. In 2011, the literacy rate of Muktainagar village was 84.41% compared to an average of 82.34% in Maharashtra. In Muktainagar male literacy stands at 88.86% and female literacy at 79.70%. Members of scheduled castes (SC) constituted 10.75% of the population of Muktainagar village, while scheduled tribes (ST) made up 5.25%.

== Education facilities ==
G.G. Khadse College is a college offering undergraduate and postgraduate courses. A veterinary college is expected to start in 2020.

== Politics ==
The former President of India Pratibha Patil started her political career in Muktainagar in the early 1960s. The former revenue minister of Maharashtra, Eknath Khadse, was MLA from Muktainagar from 1989 to 2019. Shiv Sena's Chandrakant Nimba Patil is the current MLA from the Muktainagar Vidhan Sabha constituency. He narrowly defeated Rohini Eknath Khadse of the BJP in the 2019 Maharashtra Legislative Assembly elections.

== See also ==
- Muktainagar Punarvasan Tappa 2 Ghotala
